= List of Colombian films =

This is a list of films produced in the Colombian cinema, ordered by year and decade of release.

== 1910s ==
Title	Director	Cast	Genre	Notes
1915
La hija del Tequendama	Francisco di Doménico, Vincenzo di Doménico		Silent	
El drama del 15 de octubre	Francisco di Doménico, Vincenzo di Doménico		Silent	

== 1920s ==
Title	Director	Cast	Genre	Notes
1921
Tierra caucana	Donato di Doménico		Silent	
1922
María	Máximo Calvo Olmedo and Alfredo del Diestro	Hernando Sinisterra, Juan del Diestro	Drama, romance	First feature film made in Colombia
1923
La tragedia del silencio	Arturo Acevedo Vallarino	Gonzalo Acevedo Bernal, Alberto de Argáez, Alberto López Isaza	Silent	
1924
Aura o las violetas	Vincenzo di Doménico, Pedro Moreno Garzón	Ferrucio Benincore, Roberto Estrada Vergara, Isabel Von Walden	Drama, romance	
Madres	Samuel Velásquez	Isabel Trujillo, Inés Trujillo, Jaime Toro Álvarez, Antonio Jaramillo Mejía, Antonio Gómez Villegas, Alfonso González, Gabriel Jaramillo Arango	Drama	
1925
Bajo el cielo antioqueño	Arturo Acevedo Vallarino	Alicia Arango de Mejía, Gonzalo Mejía Trujillo, Juan B. Naranjo, Harold Maynham	Drama, romance	
Alma provinciana	Félix Joaquín Rodríguez	Alí Bernal, Maga Dalla, Fidel Salazar	Drama, romance	
Como los muertos	Pedro Moreno Garzón and Vincenzo di Doménico	Matilde Palau, Joaquín Sem	Silent	
Suerte y azar	Camilo Cantinazzi	Mara Meba, Gina Buzaki, Elías Quijano, Hernando Domínguez Sánchez	Silent	
1926
El amor, el deber y el crimen	Pedro Moreno Garzón and Vincenzo di Doménico	Rafael Burgos, Mara Meba	Silent	
Nido de cóndores	Alfonso Mejía Robledo	Fernando Jaramillo, Inés Rendón	Silent	
Tuya es la culpa	Camilo Cantinazzi	Mara Meba, Gina Buzaki, Elías Quijano, Hernando Domínguez Sánchez	Silent	
1927
Garras de oro	P. P. Jambrina		Drama, satire	
1928
Los amores de Keliff	Arturo Sanín		Silent	

== 1930s ==
Title	Director	Cast	Genre	Notes
1938
Al son de las guitarras	Alberto Santana, Carlos Schroeder	Lily Barrés, Olga Barrés, Eloy Sánchez, Miguel Higueras, Carlos Rodríguez, Rosalbina Guerrero	Comedy	First Colombian sound film

== 1940s ==
Title	Director	Cast	Genre	Notes
1941
Flores del valle	Máximo Calvo Olmedo, Pedro Moreno Garzón	Julio Agudelo, Marta Bustamante, Delfina Calvo	Comedy, drama, music	
1943
Allá en el trapiche	Roberto Saa Silva	Pedro Caicedo, Tocayo Ceballos	Comedy, musical	
1944
Anarkos	Roberto Saa Silva	Carlos Jiménez, Pina Quevedo, Mario González	Drama	
Antonia Santos	Miguel Joseph	Lily Álvarez, Guillermo Beltrán, Raúl Otto Burgos, Carlos Campos	Drama	
Golpe de gracia	Hans Brückner	Tocayo Ceballos, Sofía Hernández, Hernando Vega Escobar	Comedy, musical	
Castigo del fanfarrón	Máximo Calvo Olmedo, Roberto González	Carmen de la Vega, Aurora Obón Alonso	Drama	
1945
Bambucos y corazones	Gabriel Martínez	Nerón Rojas, Lily Álvarez, Maruja Yepes	Comedy, musical	
El sereno de Bogotá	Gabriel Martínez	Sara Bahamondes, Lucy Baquero, Andrés Caro	Drama	
La canción de mi tierra	Federico Katz	Alba del Castillo, Gonzalo Rivera, Celestino Riera	Comedy, musical	
Sendero de luz	Emilio Álvarez Correa	María Cortijo, Hernando Vega Escobar, Julio Barco	Drama	

== 1950s ==
Title	Director	Cast	Genre	Notes
1954
La langosta azul	Álvaro Cepeda Samudio, Gabriel García Márquez, Enrique Grau, Luis Vicens	Nereo López, Ramón Jessurum, Cecilia Porras	Surrealist	
1955
La gran obsesión	Guillermo Ribón Alba	Hernando Álvarez, Alfonso Carvajal, Berly Cuéllar	Drama	
1956
Llamas contra el viento	Emilio Gómez Muriel	Ariadna Welter, Yolanda Varela, Anabelle Gutiérrez	Drama, romance	Mexican-Colombian co-production
1958
El milagro de sal	Luis Moya Sarmiento	Allan Duguet, Javier Díaz, Aldemar García	Drama	
Dos ángeles y medio	Demetrio Aguilera Malta	Juan Caballero, Marlon De Castro, Gustavo Corredor Ortíz	Drama	
1959
À bride abattue	Alphonse Gimeno	Linda Roméo, Fernando Pacheco Gonzáles, Amédée, Hamid Saab	Drama	French-Colombian co-production

== 1960s ==
Title	Director	Cast	Genre	Notes
1960
Antioquia, crisol de la libertad	Alejandro Kerk	Henry Cardona, Hernando González Palacio, Tomás Valencia	History	
1961
Entre risas y máscaras	Enrique Gutiérrez y Simón, Humberto Wilches		Drama	
Una mujer de cuatro en conducta	Carlos Cañola Tobón	Rosario Vásquez Calle, Gabriela Montoya Rivera, Héctor Correa Leal	Drama	
Raíces de piedra	José María Arzuaga	Humberto Arana, Olga Arana, Juan Belmonte	Drama	
Mares de pasión	Manuel de la Pedrosa	Tulia de Azuero, Édgar Badlissi, Billy Bedoya	Comedy, musical	
El hijo de la choza	Enoch Roldán	Nelly Restrepo, Jairo Tobón, Juan Pablo Piedrahíta	Biography, drama	
Farándula	Carlos Pinzón	Otto Greiffestein, Marcos Pérez, Francisco José Restrepo	Comedy, drama	
Chambú	Alejandro Kerk	Lyda Zamora, Yamile Humar, Arturo Urrea, Berha Matyasevich	Drama	
1962
El hermano Caín	Mario López	Iván Herrera, Max Castillo, Luis Hernández	Drama	
La paga	Ciro Durán	Alberto Álvarez, María Escalona, Rafael Briceño	Drama	
San Andrés, isla de ensueño	Alejandro Kerk	Régulo Ramírez, Ivonne Yamil, Sandra Scott	Comedy, musical, romance	
1963
Tres cuentos colombianos	Julio Luzardo, Alberto Mejía Estrada	Jorge Boneu, Ramón Boneu, Venancio Bonilla	Drama	
Y la novia dijo...	Gaetano Dell'Era	Jorge Ramírez, Lizardo Díaz Muñoz, Raquel Ercole	Comedy, musical, romance	
1964
Semáforo en rojo	Julián Soler	Ofelia Montesco, Roberto Cañedo, José Gálvez	Action, drama	Mexican-Colombian co-production
El río de las tumbas	Julio Luzardo	Jorge Andrade Rivera, Carlos Benjumea, Juan Harvey Caycedo	Comedy, crime, drama	
Las hijas de Elena	René Cardona Jr.	Baby Bell, Adolfo Blum, Hector Cabrera	Drama	Mexican-Colombian co-production
El cráter	José Ángel Carbonell	Ángela Botero, Yamile Humar, Antonio Iturrialde	Drama	
1965
Adorada enemiga	René Cardona Jr.	Lorena Velázquez, Angélica María, Alicia Caro	Drama	Mexican-Colombian co-production
El detective genial	René Cardona Jr.	Conrado Cortés, Aldemar García, Ángel Alberto Moreno	Comedy	Mexican-Colombian co-production
Tierra amarga	Roberto Ochoa	Lorenzo Miranda, Francisco José Restrepo, Liz Bertrand	Drama, romance	
1966
Cada voz lleva su angustia	Julio Bracho	José Gálvez, Enrique Pontón, Lyda Zamora	Drama	Mexican-Colombian co-production
El suicida	Ángel Arzuaga	Henry Martínez, Ángela del Campo, Carmenza Díaz	Drama	
María	Enrique Grau	Francisca Ponce de León, Arturo Esguerra, Sofía Prieto de Soto	Experimental	
1967
Un ángel de la calle	Zacarías Gómez Urquiza	Orlando Beltrán, Luis Chiape, María Eugenia Dávila	Drama	Mexican-Colombian co-production
Pasado el meridiano	José María Arzuaga	Henry Martínez, Gladys del Campo, Nury Vásquez	Drama	
La muerte escucha	Robert Topart	Jean Gras, Christian Kerville, Francesco Leccia	Drama	
1968
Réquiem por un canalla	Fernando Orozco	Alicia Bonet, Manuel Capetillo, Joaquín Cordero	Drama	Mexican-Colombian co-production
El secreto de las esmeraldas	Sebastián Almeida	Arturo Correa, Celia Crespo, Rosa Morena	Musical	Spanish-Colombian co-production
Aquileo venganza	Ciro Durán	Carlos Muñoz, Camilo Medina, Rey Vásquez	Western	Colombian-Venezuelan co-production
Bajo la tierra	Santiago García	Carlos Julio Sánchez, Líber Fernández, Estrellita Nieto	Drama	
Cautivo del más allá	Rafael Portillo	Beatriz Aguirre, Gonzalo Aiza, Roberto Cañedo	Drama, mystery, horror	Mexican-Colombian co-production

== 1970s ==
Title	Director	Cast	Genre	Notes
1970
Quatre hommes aux poings nus	Robert Topart	Jean Gras, Christian Kerville, François Leccia	Adventure	French-Italian-Colombian co-production
1971
Bajo el ardiente sol	Zacarías Gómez Urquiza	Joaquín Cordero, Claudia Islas, Raquel Ércole	Drama, romance	Mexican-Colombian co-production. Also known as La insaciable.
El taciturno	Jorge Gaitán Gómez	Carlos Cortés, Gerardo González, Jimeno González	Adventure, western	
1972
The Brickmakers	Marta Rodriguez, Jorge Silva		Documentary	
Una tarde, un lunes	Julio Luzardo	Ananías Cruz, Fuencisla Cruz, Dora Franco	Comedy	
The Proud and the Damned	Ferde Grofé Jr.	Chuck Connors, Aron Kincaid, Cesar Romero, José Greco	Western	American-Colombian co-production
María	Tito Davison	Taryn Power, Fernando Allende, José Suárez	Drama, romance	Mexican-Colombian co-production. Best Film at ACE Awards.
En el país de Bella Flor	Fernando Laverde		Animation	
1973
Cumbia	Zacarías Gómez Urquiza	Zulma Faiad, Julio Aldama, Evaristo Márquez	Drama, music	Mexican-Colombian co-production
Préstame a tu marido	Julio Luzardo	Bertha Helena Arzayus, Carlos Benjumea, Luis Gaivez	Comedy	
1974
El muro del silencio	Luis Alcoriza	Fabiola Falcón, David Reynoso, Armando Silvestre	Drama	Mexican-Colombian co-production
El tesoro de Morgan	Zacarías Gómez Urquiza	Pilar Bayona, Agustín Martínez Solares, Lorena Velázquez	Adventure, drama	Mexican-Colombian-Panamanian co-production
The Prey	Domenico Paolella	Zeudi Araya, Franco Gasparri, Micheline Presle	Drama, erotic	Italian-Colombian co-production
Karla contra los jaguares	Juan Manuel Herrera	Marcela López, Gilberto Puentes, María Eugenia Dávila	Action, adventure	Mexican-Colombian co-production
Dschungelmädchen für zwei Halunken	Ernst Hofbauer, Fernando Orozco	Alberto Dell'Acqua, Wolf Goldan, Rinaldo Talamonti	Adventure, comedy	West German-Italian-Spanish-Colombian co-production
The Kid and the Killers	Ralph C. Bluemke	Jon Cypher, John Garcés, Gerry Ross	Adventure, western	American-Colombian co-production
Aura o las violetas	Gustavo Nieto Roa	César Bernal, Martha Stella Calle, Ugo Armando Herrera	Drama, romance	
1975
Los jaguares contra el invasor misterioso	Juan Manuel Herrera	King Bryner, Fedra, Julio César Luna	Mystery, science fiction	Mexican-Colombian co-production
Pistoleros de la muerte	Juan Manuel Herrera	Luis García Chiappe, Rogelio Guerra, Franky Linero	Action, adventure	Mexican-Colombian co-production
El siervo José Gregorio	Henry Téllez	Ronald Ayazo, Leonardo Guzmán, Hernán Escobar	Biography, drama	Also known as El médico de Dios
My Mother's Friend	Mauro Ivaldi	Barbara Bouchet, Roberto Cenci, Carmen Villani	Romance	
1976
Paco	Robert Vincent O'Neill	José Ferrer, Allen Garfield, Pernell Roberts	Family	
Santo en el misterio de la perla negra	Fernando Orozco	Santo, Frank Braña, Mara Cruz, Juan Garza	Family	Spanish-Mexican-Colombian co-production. Also known as The Caribbean Connection.
1977
Gamín	Ciro Durán		Documentary	
The Vampires of Poverty	Luis Ospina and Carlos Mayolo		Mockumentary	
La llamada del sexo	Tulio Demicheli	Andrés García, Rossy Mendoza, George Hilton	Thriller	Spanish-Mexican-Colombian-Dominican co-production. Also known as Dulcemente morirás por amor.
Funeral siniestro	Jairo Pinilla	Constanza Rincón, Jairo Pinilla	Horror	
Pasos en la niebla	José María Arzuaga	Luis Felipe Solano, María Angélica Mallarino, Guillermo Marzán	Drama, thriller	
Mamagay	Jorge Gaitán Gómez	Haydée Balza, Humberto Martínez Salcedo, Betty Valderrama	Comedy, drama	Venezuelan-Colombian co-production
Respetables delincuentes	Ernst Hofbauer	Robert Widmark, Marta Stella Calle, Wolf Goldan, Pierangeli Llinas	Comedy, drama	
Esposos en vacaciones	Gustavo Nieto Roa	Carlos Benjumea, María Eugenia Dávila, Otto Greiffestein	Comedy	
La pobre viejecita	Fernando Laverde	Ana María Sánchez	Animation	
A Magic Box	Marta Granados		Animation	English-Colombian co-production
1978
Ángel negro	Tulio Demicheli	Carlos Ballesteros, Carlos Bracho, Sandra Mozarowsky	Action, drama	Spanish-Mexican-Colombian co-production
El Patas	Pepe Sánchez	Pepe Sánchez, María Eugenia Dávila, Franky Linero	Comedy	
El candidato	Mario Mitrotti	Jaime Santos, Carlos Benjumea, Hugo Patiño	Comedy	
1979
The Widow of Montiel	Miguel Littin	Geraldine Chaplin, Nelson Villagra, Katy Jurado	Drama	Mexican-Colombian-Venezuelan-Cuban co-production. Winner of Huelva Latin American Film Festival. Nominated for Golden Bear at Berlin International Film Festival.
Kentavry	Vytautas Žalakevičius, Sándor Köõ	Donatas Banionis, Regimantas Adomaitis, Margit Lukács	Drama	Soviet-Hungarian-Czechoslovak-Colombian co-production
El taxista millonario	Gustavo Nieto Roa	Carlos Benjumea, Rosa Gloria Chagoyán, Delfina Guido	Comedy	
Colombia Connection	Gustavo Nieto Roa	Carlos Benjumea, Martha Stella Calle, Otto Greiffestein	Comedy, thriller	
Reencuentro	Jorge Sáenz Calero	Rosemberg Jaramillo, Patricia Samudio	Drama	
Arrieros semos	Carlos Eduardo Uribe	Dora Cadavid, Mauricio Figueroa, Alfredo González	Drama	

== 1980s ==
Title	Director	Cast	Genre	Notes
1980
Amor ciego	Gustavo Nieto Roa	Jaime Moreno, Apollonia Kotero, Carlos Muñoz	Drama, romance	
Área maldita	Jairo Pinilla	Lupe Blanco, Gustavo de la Hoz, Julio del Mar	Drama, thriller	Distributed by United Artists
Tiempo para amar	Gustavo Nieto Roa, Manuel José Álvarez	Jaime Moreno, Julio Alemán, Sergio Castaño	Musical, romance	Mexican-Colombian co-production
Las cuatro edades del amor	Alberto Giraldo Castro, Mario Mitrotti, Jorge Alí Triana, Ciro Durán	Luis A. García, Alberto Giraldo Castro	Comedy, drama	
El lado oscuro del Nevado	Pascual Guerrero	Peter Hoss, María Angélica Mallarino, Jaime Delgado	Drama, thriller	
Cien años de infidelidad	Eduardo Sáenz	Hernando Casanova, Franky Linero, Hugo Pérez	Drama	
El inmigrante latino	Gustavo Nieto Roa	Carlos Benjumea, Franky Linero	Comedy, musical	
Remolino sangriento	Jorge Gaitán Gómez, Roberto Bianchi Montero	Eduardo Vidal, Rosa Gloria Vásquez, Armando Silvestre	Drama	Colombian-Italian co-production
1981
La abuela	Leopoldo Pinzón	Teresa Gutiérrez, Gloria Gómez, José Saldarriaga	Drama	
Canaguaro	Dunav Kuzmanich	Hernando Casanova, Álvaro Ruiz, Pepe Sánchez	Drama, thriller	Nominated for Best Film at Three Continents Festival.
La agonía del difunto	Dunav Kuzmanich	Julio Alemán, Raquel Bardisa, Hernando Casanova	Drama	
Padre por accidente	Manuel Busquets Emiliani	Carlos Benjumea, Paola Jiménez Pons, Julio Alemán, Saby Kamalich	Drama	
Kapax del Amazonas	Alfred S. Brell, Miguel Ángel Rincón	Kapax, María Bauza, Alfred S. Brell	Adventure, romance	Spanish-Colombian co-production. Also known as El hombre del Gran Río.
Amenaza nuclear	Jacques Osorio	Jorge Ramírez, Lizardo Díaz Muñoz, Lyda Zamora, Lee Ki-Jeong	Action, comedy	
1982
Pura sangre	Luis Ospina	Humberto Arango, Patricia Bonilla, Nelly Delgado	Horror, thriller	Best Actress and Best Soundtrack at Cartagena Film Festival. Special Mention at Sitges Film Festival.
27 horas con la muerte	Jairo Pinilla	Julio del Mar, Yvonne Maritza Gómez, Ana María Hurtado	Drama, horror	
Así va	Jorge Echeverri	Cecilia Vargas, Ana María Ospina, María Isabel Vargas	Drama, romance	
La virgen y el fotógrafo	Luis Alfredo Sánchez	Franky Linero, Amparo Grisales, Eric del Castillo, Mónica Herrán	Comedy	
Ayer me echaron del pueblo	Jorge Gaitán Gómez	Camilo Medina, Stella Suárez, Francisco Amaya	Drama	
El manantial de las fieras	Ramiro Meléndez	Fabián Aranza, Bruno Rey, Tere Álvarez	Action, drama	Mexican-Colombian co-production
La noche infernal	Rittner Bedoya	Gustavo de la Hoz, Julio Rodríguez, Gloria Iregui	Crime, horror	
Tacones	Pascual Guerrero	María Fernanda Martínez, Herman Waxler, Fanny Mikey	Comedy, musical	Mexican-Colombian co-production
El último asalto	Ramiro Meléndez	Fabián Aranza, Tere Álvarez, Leonor González	Action, drama	Mexican-Colombian co-production
1983
Carne de tu carne	Carlos Mayolo	Adriana Herrán, David Guerrero, Santiago García	Drama, horror	Best Cinematography at Bogotá Film Festival. Won Best Actress and nominated for Best Film at Fantasporto.
Ajuste de cuentas	Dunav Kuzmanich	Hernando Casanova, Marcelo Gaete, Florina Lemaitre	Crime, drama	
El escarabajo	Lisandro Duque Naranjo	Gina Morett, Eduardo Gazcón, Argemiro Castiblanco	Drama	Best Film at Bogotá Film Festival. Nominated for Golden Prize at Moscow International Film Festival.
Cristobal Colón	Fernando Laverde	Carlos de la Fuente, Karina, Paula Peña	Animation	
1984
Cóndores no entierran todos los días	Francisco Norden	Frank Ramírez, Vicky Hernández, Isabela Corona	Drama	Best First Work and Best Actor at Biarritz Film Festival. Best Film, Actor, Actress, Editing and Sound at Bogotá Film Festival. Best Actor at Chicago International Film Festival. Won Acting Award and Critics Award at Huelva Latin American Film Festival. Honorable Mention at Figueira da Foz International Film Festival.
Con su música a otra parte	Camila Loboguerrero	Diego León Hoyos, Nelly Moreno	Drama	Best Actor and Best Actress at Bogotá Film Festival
Triángulo de oro	Jairo Pinilla	Jorge Pinilla, Ana Cecilia Mejía, Saíd González	Adventure	
Caín	Gustavo Nieto Roa	Armando Gutiérrez, Marta Liliana Ruiz, Jorge Emilio Salazar	Drama	
Erotikón	Ramiro Meléndez	Nelly Moreno, Mariangela Giordano, Juan Antonio Edwards	Erotic	Mexican-Colombian co-production
Ay hombe	Daniel Bautista	Ignacio Hijuelos, Matilde Suescún, Luz Nelly Díaz	Music, romance	
1985
Tiempo de morir	Jorge Alí Triana	Gustavo Angarita, Sebastián Ospina, Jorge Emilio	Drama	Best Cinematography and Best Editing at Havana Film Festival. Nominated for Best Feature at Chicago International Film Festival. Nominated for Best Spanish Language Foreign Film at Goya Awards.
Fuga scabrosamente pericolosa	Nello Rossati	Rodrigo Obregón, Eleonora Vallone, Franky Linero	Action, adventure	Italian-Colombian co-production
Oro blanco, droga maldita	Ramiro Meléndez	Blanca Guerra, Gregorio Casal, Eric del Castillo	Action, crime, drama	Mexican-Colombian co-production
Pisingaña	Leopoldo Pinzón	July Pedraza, Carlos Barbosa, Consuelo Luzardo	Drama	Nominated for Golden Prize at Moscow International Film Festival
El día de las Mercedes	Dunav Kuzmanich	Hernando Casanova, Iván Rodríguez, Miguel Ángel Cañas	Drama	
Extraña Regresión	Jairo Pinilla	Gloria Ida Bohorquez, Adriana Castillo, Azucena Celimin	Drama, mystery, thriller	
Bonaparte investigador privado	James Pasternak	Carlos Benjumea, Marta Riveira, Luis Fernando Orozco	Comedy, crime	
1986
La boda del acordeonista	Luis Fernando Bottia	Orangel Maestre, Iris Oyola, Natalia Caballero	Drama, romance	Best Original Score at Bogotá Film Festival. Won Best Score and nominated for Golden Montgolfiere at Three Continents Festival. Best First Work at Havana Film Festival.
De mujer a mujer	Mauricio Walerstein	Humberto Zurita, Amparo Grisales, Daniel Alvarado	Drama	Colombian-Venezuelan co-production
La mansión de Araucaima	Carlos Mayolo	Adriana Herrán, José Lewgoy, Vicky Hernández	Drama	Best Director, Best Actor, Actress and Cinematography (in a Colombian Film) and Best Editing at Bogotá Film Festival.
El día que me quieras	Sergio Dow	Fausto Verdial, María Eugenia Dávila, Claudio Berge	Drama, musical, romance	Venezuelan-Colombian-Argentine-American co-production. Best First Film, Cinematography and Production Design at Bogotá Film Festival. Best Actress at Cartagena Film Festival. Won House of the Americas award at Havana Film Festival. Nominated for Best Feature at Chicago International Film Festival.
Visa USA	Lisandro Duque Naranjo	Marcela Agudelo, Armando Gutiérrez, Gellver de Currea	Romantic Comedy	Colombian-Cuban co-production. Best Colombian Film, Supporting Actor and Best Screenplay (in a Colombian Film) at Bogotá Film Festival. Best Film and New Actress at Cartagena Film Festival.
Ahora mis pistolas hablan	Fernando Orozco, Alfred S. Brell	Felipe Arriaga, Emilio Fernández, Alfred S. Brell	Western	Spanish-Mexican-Colombian co-production
Izbrannye	Sergei Solovyov	Leonid Filatov, Tatyana Drubich, Amparo Grisales	Drama	Soviet-Colombian co-production
A la salida nos vemos	Carlos Palau	Alejandro Madriñán, Abril Méndez, Santiago Madriñán	Comedy, drama	Colombian-Venezuelan co-production
San Antoñito	Pepe Sánchez	Carlos Jaramillo, Ángela Calderón, Nubia Tapias	Comedy, drama	
Mariposas S.A.	Dunav Kuzmanich	Flor Núñez, Darcy d'Sus, Yulika Krausz	Comedy, drama	
El tren de los pioneros	Leonel Gallego	Manuel Restrepo, Ana María Ochoa, Fabio Ríos	Drama, history	
El embajador de la India	Mario Ribero Ferreira	Hugo Gómez, Olga Lucía Alvira, José María Arzuaga	Comedy	
1987
Cronaca di una morte annunciata	Francesco Rosi	Ornella Muti, Rupert Everett, Anthony Delon	Drama	Italian-French-Colombian co-production. Nominated for Palme d'Or at Cannes Film Festival. Nominated for Best Director and Cinematography at Italian National Syndicate of Film Journalists.
El Cristo de espaldas	Jorge Alí Triana	Luis Fernando Montoya, Jorge Emilio Salazar, Víctor Hugo Morant	Drama	
El niño y el Papa	Rodrigo Castaño	Andrés García, Verónica Castro, Carmenza Duque	Drama	Mexican-Colombian co-production
1988
Tropical Snow	Ciro Durán	David Carradine, Madeleine Stowe, Jsu Garcia	Drama	American-Colombian co-production
Profundo	Antonio Llerandi	Rafael Briceño, Tania Sarabia, Orlando Urdaneta	Crime, drama	Venezuelan-Colombian co-production
Con el corazón en la mano	Mauricio Walerstein	María Conchita Alonso, Daniel Alvarado	Drama	Venezuelan-Colombian co-production
Un hombre y una mujer con suerte	Gustavo Nieto Roa	Fernando Allende, Federico Arango, Manuel Busquets	Drama	
Técnicas de duelo: Una cuestión de honor	Sergio Cabrera	Frank Ramírez, Humberto Dorado, Florina Lemaitre	Comedy	Best Actor, Supporting Actress, Director and Editing at Bogotá Film Festival. Best Ibero-American Film and Kikito Critics Prize at Festival de Gramado. Nominated for Best Spanish Language Foreign Film at Goya Awards.
Milagro en Roma	Lisandro Duque Naranjo	Frank Ramírez, Gerardo Arellano, Amalia Duque García	Drama	
1989
Mujer de fuego	Mario Mitrotti	Sonia Infante, Roberto Guzmán, Carlos Montilla	Drama	Venezuelan-Mexican-Colombian co-production
Martín Fierro	Fernando Laverde	Paulino Andrada, Alberto Benegas, Rafael Chumbito	Animation	Argentine-Colombian co-production
Un cuarto para las tres	Bernardo Romero Pereiro		Drama	

== 1990s ==
Title	Director	Cast	Genre	Notes
1990
Rodrigo D: No Futuro	Víctor Gaviria	Ramiro Meneses, Carlos Restrepo, Jackson Gallego	Crime, drama	Nominated for Palme d'Or at Cannes Film Festival.
Morning	Felipe Paz	Juan Fischer	Drama	Romanian-Colombian co-production
Amar y vivir	Carlos Duplat	María Fernanda Martínez, Luis Eduardo Motoa, Gerardo Calero	Drama	
María Cano	Camila Loboguerrero	María Eugenia Dávila, Frank Ramírez, Maguso	Biography, drama, romance	Best Actor at Bogotá Film Festival. Best Cinematography at Cartagena Film Festival. Best Film at San Antonio CineFestival.
1991
Confesión a Laura	Jaime Osorio Gómez	María Cristina Gálvez, Vicky Hernández, Gustavo Londoño	Drama	Best Actress at Havana Film Festival
Canturrón	Gonzalo Mejía	Óscar Hernández, Mario Yépez, Marleny Carvajal	Comedy	
La gente de la Universal	Felipe Aljure	Álvaro Rodríguez, Jennifer Steffens, Robinson Díaz	Black comedy	Spanish-Colombian-British-Bulgarian co-production. Won Bronze Precolumbian Circle and nominated for Best Film at Bogotá Film Festival. Best Unpublished Screenplay at Havana Film Festival. Best Original Screenplay and Best Actor at Rhode Island International Film Festival. Audience Award and Critics Award at Uruguay International Film Festival.
1992
Y	Paola Panero	Kika Child, Helena Mallarino, Andrés Navia	Drama	
1993
La pequeña maldición de tener este cuerpo	Juan Fernando Devis	Ricardo González, Patricia Garrido, Marta Rodríguez	Crime	
Zoi harisameni	Patrice Vivancos	Thanasis Vengos, Giorgos Moshidis, Eva Kotamanidou	Drama	Greek-Colombian-Spanish-French co-production. Best Actress, Supporting Actor and Music at Thessaloniki Film Festival.
La estrategia del caracol	Sergio Cabrera	Fausto Cabrera, Frank Ramírez, Delfina Guido	Comedy, drama	Colombian-Italian-French co-production. Won Prize of the Ecumenical Jury's Forum of New Cinema award at Berlin International Film Festival. Won Golden Sun at Biarritz Film Festival. Won Silver Precolumbian Circle, Best Colombian Film and Director at Bogota Film Festival. Nominated for Best Spanish Language Foreign Film at Goya Awards. Won Grand Coral - Second Prize, Best Music and Production Design and 3rd place for Audience Award at Havana Film Festival. Golden Colon at Huelva Latin American Film Festival. Golden Spike at Valladolid International Film Festival.
1994
Águilas no cazan moscas	Sergio Cabrera	Frank Ramírez, Humberto Dorado, Florina Lemaitre	Comedy	Colombian-Cuban-Italian co-production. Won Special Jury Prize - Latin Cinema at Sundance Film Festival. UNESCO Award at Venice Film Festival.
Simón Bolívar, ese soy yo	Raysa Andrade, Edmundo Aray		Animation	Won Special Jury Prize - Animation at Havana Film Festival
El reino de los cielos	Patricia Cardoso	Humberto Dorado, Yolanda García, Florina Lemaitre	Drama	
1995
Amores y delitos: El alma del maíz	Patricia Restrepo	Luis Eduardo Arango, Álvaro Bayona, Humberto Dorado	Drama	
Amores y delitos: Amores ilícitos	Heriberto Fiorillo	Robinson Díaz, Magali Caicedo, Cristóbal Errazúriz	Drama, romance	
Amores y delitos: Bituima 1780	Luis Alberto Restrepo	Rolf Abderhalden, Marcela Agudelo, Humberto Dorado	Drama	
Bésame mucho	Philippe Toledano	Amparo Grisales, Antonio Drija, Gustavo Rodríguez	Crime, drama, romance	Venezuelan-Colombian-Mexican co-production
1996
Edipo alcalde	Jorge Alí Triana	Jorge Perugorría, Ángela Molina, Francisco Rabal	Drama	Colombian-Spanish-Mexican-Cuban co-production. Nominated for Best Film at Bogotá Film Festival. Nominated for Best Film (Latin Competition) at Gramado Film Festival.
Ilona llega con la lluvia	Sergio Cabrera	Margarita Rosa de Francisco, Imanol Arias, Pastora Vega	Drama	Colombian-Italian-Spanish co-production. Best Actress at Biarritz Film Festival. Best Actress and Cinematography and nominated for Best Film (Latin Competition) at Gramado Film Festival. Won Award of the Havana University at Havana Film Festival. Nominated for Golden Spike at Valladolid International Film Festival. Nominated for Golden Lion at Venice Film Festival.
La nave de los sueños	Ciro Durán	Óscar Borda, Lourdes Elizarrarás, Gledys Ibarra	Drama	Venezuelan-Colombian-Mexican co-production. Best Supporting Actor from Mexican Cinema Journalists. Won Audience Award at Films from the South.
La mujer del piso alto	Ricardo Coral	Fernando Solórzano, Hernán Méndez Alonso, Álvaro Bayona	Crime, drama, romance	
1997
La deuda	Nicolás Buenaventura, Manuel José Álvarez	Nicolás Buenaventura, Manuel José Álvarez, Vicky Hernández	Comedy, drama	French-Colombian-Cuban co-production. Won Special Jury Prize at Biarritz Film Festival.
Todo está oscuro	Ana Díez	Silvia Munt, Diego Achury, Valeria Santa	Thriller	Spanish-Portuguese-Colombian-Cuban co-production. Nominated for Best Film at Bogotá Film Festival.
Así es como son las cosas	Juan Pablo Félix		Drama	
El premio	Eduardo Morino	Alejandro López, Walter Rojas	Drama	
Posición viciada	Ricardo Coral	Álvaro Bayona, Henry Castillo, Harold Fonseca	Drama	
No morirás	Jorge Alí Triana	Braulio Castillo, Katherine Vélez, Edgardo Román	Drama	
1998
La vendedora de rosas	Víctor Gaviria	Lady Tabares, Marta Correa, Mileider Gil	Drama	Best Film and Director at Bogotá Film Festival. Best Actress and Special Jury Prize at Bratislava International Film Festival. Nominated for Palme d'Or at Cannes Film Festival. Won ARCI-LUCA Award, Best Editing, CARACOL Special Award, Glauber Rocha Award, Grand Coral - Third Prize, OCIC Award and Special Mention at Havana Film Festival. Best Director at Miami Hispanic Film Festival. Nominated for Best Latin-American Film at Ariel Awards. Best Actress, Director and nominated for Best Film at Viña del Mar Film Festival.
Golpe de estadio	Sergio Cabrera	Emma Suárez, Nicolás Montero, César Mora	Comedy, romance, sport	Spanish-Italian-Colombian co-production. Nominated for Best Spanish Language Foreign Film at Goya Awards.
El último carnaval	Ernesto McCausland	Jorge Cao, Jennifer Steffens	Comedy, fantasy	Nominated for Best Colombian Film at Bogotá Film Festival. Best Film Poster at Havana Film Festival.
1999
Soplo de vida	Luis Ospina	Fernando Solórzano, Flora Martínez, Robinson Díaz	Drama, thriller	French-Colombian co-production. Best Actress and nominated for Golden Sun at Biarritz Film Festival. Nominated for Best Film and Colombian Film at Bogotá Film Festival. Best Film and Director at Cartagena Film Festival. Best Actor at Havana Film Festival.
Es mejor ser rico que pobre	Ricardo Coral	Juana Acosta, Fernando Arevalo, Álvaro Bayona	Drama	
El séptimo cielo	Juan Fischer	Roberto De La Peña, Catalina Lago, Juan Pablo Shuk	Drama	Best Colombian Film at Bogotá Film Festival
Rizo	Julio Sosa Pietri	Jean Carlo Simancas, Arcelia Ramírez, Luly Bossa	Drama	Venezuelan-Colombian-Mexican co-production
El Intruso	Guillermo Álvarez	Luz Ángela Bermúdez, Germán Torres, Guillermo Álvarez	Crime	Honorable Mention and nominated for Best Colombian Film at Bogotá Film Festival.

== 2000s ==
Title	Director	Cast	Genre	Notes
2000
La virgen de los sicarios	Barbet Schroeder	Germán Jaramillo, Anderson Ballesteros, Juan David Restrepo	Crime, drama, romance	Colombian-Spanish-French co-production. Best Work of a Non-Latin American Director on a Latin America Subject at Havana Film Festival. Nominated for PFS Award (Exposé) at Political Film Society. Nominated for Best Motion Picture (Foreign Language) at Satellite Award. Won The President of the Italian Senate's Gold Medal and nominated for Golden Lion at Venice Film Festival. Best Film at Verzaubert - International Gay & Lesbian Film Festival.
La toma de la embajada	Ciro Durán	Demián Bichir, Fabiana Medina, Humberto Dorado	Crime, drama	Colombian-Mexican-Venezuelan co-production. Won Colombian Cinema Special Jury Prize at Cartagena Film Festival.
Diástole y sístole: Los movimientos del corazón	Harold Trompetero	Nicolás Montero, Marcela Carvajal, Ramiro Meneses	Drama, romance	Nominated for Best Film at Bogotá Film Festival. Best Colombian Film, Actor and Actress and nominated for Best Film at Cartagena Film Festival.
Kalibre 35	Raúl García	Robinson Díaz, Juana Acosta, Juan Carlos Vargas	Crime	Nominated for Best Film at Bogotá Film Festival. Won Colombian Cinema Special Jury Prize and Colombian Cinema Special Mention at Cartagena Film Festival.
Juegos bajo la luna	Mauricio Walerstein	Juana Acosta, Alberto Alcalá, Alberto Alifa	Drama	Venezuelan-Mexican-Colombian co-production
La mágica aventura de Óscar	Diana Sánchez	Alberto de Faría, Bárbara Garófalo, Samantha Dagnino	Family	Venezuelan-Spanish-Colombian co-production
Terminal	Jorge Echeverry	Victoria Góngora, Ana María Kámper, Bibiana Navas	Drama	Nominated for Best Film at Bogotá Film Festival
En mi reloj siempre son las 5 y 15	María Amaral	Luis Fernando Bohórquez, Mario Duarte	Drama	
Directo Chapinero	Carlos Mario Urrea	Cristina Villar, Raúl Corró, Juana Sofía Marino	Crime, drama	
2001
Los niños invisibles	Lisandro Duque Naranjo	Guillermo Castañeda, Ingrid Cielo Ospina, Gustavo Angarita	Comedy, drama, fantasy	Colombian-Venezuelan co-production. Best Colombian Film at Bogotá Film Festival. Best Film at Cartagena Film Festival. Nominated for Grand Paoa at Viña del Mar Film Festival. Won Special Jury Prize at Montréal International Children's Film Festival.
Hemingway, the Hunter of Death	Sergio Dow	Albert Finney, Paul Guilfoyle, Fele Martínez	Adventure, drama	American-Kenyan-Spanish-Colombian co-production
La pena máxima	Jorge Echeverry	Enrique Carriazo, Robinson Díaz, Sandra Reyes	Comedy	Best Screenplay and nominated for Golden Colon at Huelva Latin American Film Festival. Honorable Mention at New York LaCinemaFe. Best Film in Spanish at San Antonio CineFestival. Nominated for Best Film at Valdivia International Film Festival.
90-60-90	Julio Roberto Peña	Héctor Malamud	Comedy, drama	
Desasosiego	Guillermo Álvarez	María Consuelo Rivera, Diego Mejía, Álvaro Díaz	Crime, drama, romance	
Bogotá 2016	Ricardo Guerra, Alejandro Basile, Pablo Mora, Jaime Sánchez	Jaime Barbini, Mario Duarte, Constanza Duque	Drama, sci-fi	
Siniestro	Ernesto McCausland	Mingo Martínez, Jairo Camargo, Karen Martínez	Drama, romance	
La decisión de San Mateo	Iván Benjumea	Juan Pablo Franco, Fernando García, Carlos Hurtado	Drama	
Orozco the Embalmer	Kiyotaka Tsurisaki			Japanese-Colombian co-production
2002
Como el gato y el ratón	Rodrigo Triana	Jairo Camargo, Alina Lozano, Patricia Maldonado	Comedy, drama	French-Colombian co-production. Nominated for Best Latin-American Film at Ariel Award. Won Golden Sun and Young Jury Prize at Biarritz Film Festival. Best Colombian Film and nominated for Best Film at Bogotá Film Festival. Best Cinematography and nominated for Best Film at Cartagena Film Festival. Won Latin Heritage and nominated for Best Film at Miami International Film Festival.
Bolívar soy yo!	Jorge Alí Triana	Robinson Díaz, Amparo Grisales, Jairo Camargo	Comedy, drama	French-Colombian co-production. Honorable Mention and nominated for Best Film at Bogotá Film Festival. Won Elcine Second Prize at Lima Latin American Film Festival. Best Film and Best Ibero-American Film at Mar del Plata Film Festival. Won Audience Award at Toulouse Latin America Film Festival. Best Screenplay and nominated for Best Film at Trieste Festival of Latin-American Cinema. Nominated for Best Film at Valdivia International Film Festival.
Asesinato en lunes de carnaval	Malena Roncayolo	Juan Carlos Alarcón, Armando Gutiérrez, Mimí Lazo	Crime, drama	Venezuelan-Colombian-Mexican co-production. Nominated for Best Film at Cartagena Film Festival.
After Party	Julio César Luna, Guillermo Rincón	Manuel Cabral, Raúl Corró, Ricardo Herrera	Drama	
Te busco	Ricardo Coral	Robinson Díaz, Felipe Rubio Lucero, Andrea Guzmán	Comedy, romance	
Humo en tus ojos	Mauricio Cataño	Ana María Kámper, Helios Fernández, Jorge Herrera	Drama, thriller	Nominated for Best Film at Bogotá Film Festival.
2003
La Primera Noche	Luis Alberto Restrepo	Carolina Lizarazo, John Álex Toro, Hernán Méndez	Drama	Nominated for Best Film at Bogotá Film Festival. Best Actor, Cinematography, First Work, OCLACC Award and nominated for Best Film at Cartagena Film Festival. Won Roberto Tato Miller Award at Mar del Plata Film Festival. Best Film at Miami International Film Festival. Won Rail d'Oc at Toulouse Latin America Film Festival.
El carro	Luis Orjuela	Mónica Lopera, Andrea Gómez, Hansel Camacho	Comedy	
Bolívar: el héroe	Guillermo Rincón	Manuel Cabral, Julio César Luna, Luis Fernando Orozco	Animation	
Emerald Cowboy	Andrew Molina	Eishy Hayata, Lucho Velasco, Juan Pablo Shuk	Biography, drama	
Hábitos sucios	Carlos Palau	Nohora Ayala, Alexandra Escobar, Carminia Martínez	Drama	
Malamor	Jorge Echeverry	Gustavo Angarita, Fabio Rubiano, John Álex Toro	Drama	Nominated for Golden St. George at Moscow International Film Festival.
Regreso a la nada	Javier Gutiérrez	Eduardo Carvajal	Crime, drama	
Champeta Paradise	Ernesto McCausland	Chechy Avendaño, Pierre Bustillo, Rafael Camerano	Drama, romance	
2004
Maria Full of Grace	Joshua Marston	Catalina Sandino Moreno, Guilied López, Orlando Tobón	Crime, drama	Colombian-American co-productior Awards: Nominated for Best Performance by an Actress in a Leading Role at Academy Awards. Nominated for Outstanding Performance by a Female Actor in a Leading Role at Screen Actors Guild Awards. Movie of the Year at AFI Awards. Best Foreign Film (Spanish Language) at Argentine Film Critics Association Awards. Won Alfred Bauer Award, Best Actress and nominated for Golden Bear at Berlin International Film Festival. Nominated for Best New Filmmaker at Boston Society of Film Critics Awards. Nominated for Best Actress and Best Foreign-Language Film at Broadcast Film Critics Association Awards. Best Actress and Special Jury Prize at Cartagena Film Festival. Nominated for Best Picture and Breakthrough Film Artist at Central Ohio Film Critics Association. Most Promising Performer at Chicago Film Critics Association Awards. Won Russell Smith Award and nominated for Best Actress and Best Foreign-Language Film at Dallas-Fort Worth Film Critics Association Awards. Audience and Critics Award and Grand Special Prize at Deauville Film Festival. Nominated for Best Motion Picture Screenplay at Edgar Award. Nominated for Screen International Award at European Film Awards. Breakthrough Award and Breakthrough Director Award at Gotham Award. Nominated for Outstanding Independent or Foreign Film at Image Awards. Best Actress and nominated for Best Picture and Best Supporting Actress at Imagen Awards. Best First Screenplay and Female Lead and nominated for Best Feature, Director and Supporting Female at Independent Spirit Awards. Nominated for Best Picture at International Cinephile Society Awards. Nominated for Actress of the Year at London Critics Circle Film Awards.New Generation Award at Los Angeles Film Critics Association Awards. Best Narrative Feature at Los Angeles Film Festival. Among Top Foreign Films at National Board of Review. Best First Film at New York Film Critics Circle Awards. Best Debut as Director at New York Film Critics Online. Best Film at Newport International Film Festival. Best Breakthrough Performance (Female), First Feature and First Screenplay and nominated for Best Actress and Foreign Language Film at Online Film & Television Association. Best Breakthrough Performance and nominated for Best Foreign Language Film and Breakthrough Director at Online Film Critics Society Awards. Best Actress at Premios ACE. Nominated for Best Non-American Film at Robert Festival. Best Foreign-Language Film at San Francisco Film Critics Circle. Best DVD Extra and the nominated for Best Actress in a Motion Picture (Drama), Motion Picture (Drama) and Director at Satellite Awards. Best Foreign-Language Film and nominated for Best Actress at Seattle Film Critics Awards. Best Actress at Seattle International Film Festival. Best Foreign Language Film at Southeastern Film Critics Association Awards. Won Audience Award (Dramatic) and nominated for Grand Jury Prize (Dramatic) at Sundance Film Festival. Won International Jury Award at São Paulo International Film Festival. Best First Feature at Toronto Film Critics Association Awards. Nominated for Best Foreign Language Film at Vancouver Film Critics Circle. Nominated for Best Foreign Language Film at Washington DC Area Film Critics Association Awards.
Perder es cuestión de método	Sergio Cabrera	Daniel Giménez Cacho, Martina García, César Mora	Thriller	Colombian-Spanish co-production. Nominated for Grand Prix des Amériques at Montreal World Film Festival. Won Audience Award and Best Director at New York LaCinemaFe.
El rey	José Antonio Dorado	Fernando Solórzano, Cristina Umaña, Marlon Moreno	Action, drama	Colombian-French-Spanish co-production. Best Colombian Film and nominated for Best Film at Bogotá Film Festival. Nominated for Best Film at Cartagena Film Festival. Nominated for Best Spanish Language Foreign Film at Goya Awards.
Sumas y restas	Víctor Gaviria	Alonso Arias, María Isabel Gaviria, Fredy York Monsalve	Drama	Colombian-Spanish co-production
La sombra del caminante	Ciro Guerra	Lowin Allende, César Badillo, Julián Díaz	Comedy, drama	Won Films in Progress Award at San Sebastián International Film Festival. Won Audience Award at Toulouse Latin America Film Festival. Won Jury Prize at Trieste Festival of Latin-American Cinema.
Colombianos, un acto de fe	Carlos Fernández de Soto	Isabella Santodomingo, Helios Fernández, Ana María Kámper	Comedy, drama	Nominated for Best Film at Bogotá Film Festival.
Sin amparo	Jaime Osorio	Luis Fernando Hoyos, Germán Jaramillo, María José Martínez	Drama	Colombian-Spanish-Venezuelan co-production. Nominated for Golden Colon at Huelva Latin American Film Festival.
El Cristo de plata	Ramiro Meléndez	Alejandro Buenaventura, Jorge Cao, Humberto Dorado	Drama	Mexican-Colombian co-production
La esquina	Raúl García	Fernando Arevalo, Rafael Bohórquez, Jairo Camargo	Comedy	Mexican-Colombian co-production
El sol de los venados	James Ordóñez	Lupe Gutiérrez, Jorge López, John Restrepo	Drama	
2005
Rosario Tijeras	Juan Zapata	Flora Martínez, Unax Ugalde, Manolo Cardona	Crime, drama, romance	Colombian-Mexican-Spanish-Brazilian co-production. Nominated for Best Screenplay Adapted from Another Source at Ariel Award. Best Colombian Film and Actress at Cartagena Film Festival. Nominated for Best Spanish Language Foreign Film at Goya Awards. Best Latin American Actress at Málaga Spanish Film Festival.
Love for Rent	Shane Edelman	Angie Cepeda, Ken Marino, Nora Dunn	Comedy, romance	American-Colombian co-production. Best Feature Film at New York International Latino Film Festival.
La historia del baúl rosado	Libia Stella Gómez	Edgardo Román, Dolores Heredia	Crime, mystery, film noir	Colombian-Mexican-Spanish co-production
Mi abuelo, mi papá y yo	Dago García, Juan Carlos Vásquez	Miguel Varoni, Jaime Barbini, Juan Fernando Sánchez	Comedy, romance	
Violeta de mil colores	Harold Trompetero	Flora Martínez	Drama	Nominated for Best Film at Bogotá Film Festival. Colombian Cinema Special Mention at Cartagena Film Festival.
Les gens honnêtes vivent en France	Bob Decout	Victoria Abril, Bruno Putzulu, Hélène de Fougerolles	Comedy, drama	Colombian-French-Spanish-Belgium co-production
El trato	Francisco Norden	Javier Gnecco, Luis Fernando Múnera, Julián Román	Drama	Colombian-French-Spanish-Belgium co-production. Nominated for Golden Colon at Huelva Latin American Film Festival.
Lying in Bed	Vlamyr Vizcaya	Nadine Birkmeyer, Josh Gibson, Lorraine Lockwood	Drama	American-Colombian co-production
Apocalipsur	Javier Mejía	Hernando Casanova, Camilo Díaz, Andrés Echavarría	Drama	Best Colombian Film, Special Jury Prize and nominated for Best Film at Cartagena Film Festival
Todos los hombres son iguales... y las mujeres también	Carlos Mario Aguirre	Carlos Mario Aguirre, Maritza Cano, Cristina Toro	Comedy, romance	
2600 metros	Roberto Flores Prieto	Álvaro Bayona, Jairo Camargo, Jorge Herrera	Drama	
¿Por qué lloran las campanas?	Jairo Pinilla	Carolina Acero, German Acero, Nidia Acero	Horror, suspense	
La voz de las alas	Jorge Echeverry	Rolf Abderhalden, Valentina Rendón	Drama, romance	
2006
El colombian dream	Felipe Aljure	Alfredo Aguilar, Eva Ahen, Juan Miguel Anzola	Comedy, drama	
Juana tenía el pelo de oro	Luis Fernando Bottía	Xiomara Galeano, Ernesto Benjumea, Carlos Cruz	Drama, fantasy	
Soñar no cuesta nada	Rodrigo Triana	Diego Cadavid, Juan Sebastián Aragón, Manuel José Chávez	Comedy, drama	Argentine-Colombian co-production. Best Actor, Supporting Actor and nominated for Best Film at Cartagena Film Festival. Nominated for Best Spanish Language Foreign Film at Goya Awards.
Al final del espectro	Juan Felipe Orozco	Noëlle Schonwald, Julieth Restrepo, Silvia De Dios	Horror, thriller	
Gringo Wedding	Tas Salini	Ana Lucía Domínguez, Justin Kane, Sebastian Boscán	Comedy, romance	Colombian-American co-production
Dios los junta y ellos se separan	Jairo Eduardo Carrillo, Harold Trompetero	Catalina Aristizábal, Marcela Benjumea, Bibiana Betancourt	Comedy	
Las cartas del gordo	Dago García, Juan Carlos Vásquez	John Mario Rivera, Quique Mendoza, Diana Ángel	Comedy	
Visitas	Pedro Lange	Mayil Georgi, Luz Stella Luengas, Enrique Giordano	Drama, thriller	Colombian-American co-production
Karmma, el peso de tus actos	Orlando Pardo	Diego Camacho, Erick Cruz, Héctor Cruz	Crime, drama	
Cuando rompen las olas	Riccardo Gabrielli	Alejandra Borrero, Sara Corrales, Pedro Falla	Drama	
Heridas	Roberto Flores Prieto	Jorge Herrera, Germán Rojas, Marlon Moreno	Drama	
2007
Satanás	Andi Baiz	Damián Alcázar, Blas Jaramillo, Marcela Mar	Crime, drama	Colombian-Mexican co-production. Nominated for Best Latin-American Film at Ariel Award. Best Colombian Film at Bogotá Film Festival. Best Colombian Film and nominated for Best Film at Cartagena Film Festival. Nominated for Golden Colon at Huelva Latin American Film Festival. 2nd place for Audience Award at Lima Latin American Film Festival. Horizons Award (Special Mention) at San Sebastián International Film Festival.
PVC-1	Spiros Stathoulopoulos	Hugo Pereira, Daniel Páez, Michael Schorling	Drama	Best Film at Bangkok International Film Festival. Won Award of the City of Rome and nominated for Golden Camera at Cannes Film Festival. Won Bitter Cup Award at Sofia International Film Festival. Won Audience Award (International Competition), Best Actor, FIPRESCI Prize (International Competition) and Silver Alexander at Thessaloniki Film Festival.
Buscando a Miguel	Juan Fischer	Luis Fernando Bohórquez, Mónica Gómez, Hernán Méndez	Comedy, drama	
Bluff	Felipe Martínez	Federico Lorusso, Víctor Mallarino, Catalina Aristizábal	Comedy, thriller	Won Audience Award (Latin America Caribbean FedEx) at Miami International Film Festival
Polvo de ángel	Óscar Blancarte	Julio Bracho, Khristian Clausen, Miguel Couturier	Sci-fi	Mexican-Colombian co-production
Esto huele mal	Jorge Alí Triana	Diego Bertie, Cristina Campuzano, Valerie Domínguez	Comedy	Mexican-Colombian co-production
Muertos del susto	Harold Trompetero	Pedro González, Endry Cardeño, Juan Ricardo Lozano	Comedy	
La ministra inmoral	Julio Luzardo, Celmira Zuluaga	Ruddy Rodríguez, Claude Pimont, Carlos Duplat	Comedy, Drama, Romance	
Anomalía perfecta	Felipe Martínez	Julián Arango, Felipe Botero, Pepe Sánchez	Comedy	
Tumba y Tumbao	Steve Carrillo, Eduardo Ortega del Río	Lorena Álvarez, Pierre Bustillo, Ana Milena, Iván Bernal	Comedy	
El gran robo	Felipe Martínez	Jairo Camargo, Diego Cadavid, Susana Torres	Crime, drama	
2008
Perro come perro	Carlos Moreno	Marlon Moreno, Óscar Borda, Álvaro Rodríguez	Thriller	Nominated for Best Latin-American Film at Ariel Award. Nominated for Grand Prix at Fribourg International Film Festival. Nominated for Best Spanish Language Foreign Film at Goya Awards. Best Actor and Cinematography (Latin Film Competition) and Best Actor (General) and won Kikito Critics Prize at Gramado Film Festival. Best Actor at Guadalajara International Film Festival. Won Silver Colon at Huelva Latin American Film Festival. 2nd Prize for Best First Work at Lima Latin American Film Festival. Nominated for Grand Jury Prize (World Cinema - Dramatic) at Sundance Film Festival.
Paraíso travel	Simón Brand	Louis Arcella, Angelica Blandon, Pedro Capo	Drama	Colombian-American co-production. Won Audience Award (Director, Favorite Foreign Feature and Favorite American Indie Feature) at Fort Lauderdale International Film Festival. Won Audience Award (Director) at Huelva Latin American Film Festival. Won Audience Award (Best Film) and Jury Award (Best Film and Director) at Los Angeles Latino International Film Festival. Won Corazon Award (Narrative Feature) at San Diego Latino Film Festival. Won Audience Award (Narrative Feature and Director) at San Francisco Bay Area International Latino Film Festival.
Entre sábanas	Gustavo Nieto Roa	Karina Mora, Marlon Moreno	Drama, erotic	
El cuarto	Gustavo Torres Gil	Manuel Bautista, Claudia Cadavid, Gavo Figueira	Mystery	
La milagrosa	Rafael Lara	Antonio Merlano, Guillermo Iván, Mónica Gómez	Drama, war	
Yo soy otro	Óscar Campo	Héctor García, Jenifer Nava, Patricia Castañeda	Drama, sci-fi, thriller	
El ángel del acordeón	María Camila Lizarazo	Camilo Molina, Dionnel Velásquez, César Navarro	Drama, music	
Los actores del conflicto	Lisandro Duque Naranjo	Arianna Cabezas, Mario Duarte, Vicente Luna	Comedy, drama	Colombian-Venezuelan co-production. Won Audience Award and OCLACC Award and nominated for Best Film at Cartagena Film Festival.
Riverside	Harold Trompetero	Diego Trujillo, Lynn Mastio Rice	Drama	
Te amo, Ana Elisa	José Antonio Dorado, Robinson Díaz	Gustavo Angarita Jr., Adriana Arango, Julián Arango	Comedy	
Ni te cases ni te embarques	Ricardo Coral	Víctor Hugo Cabrera, Andrea Noceti, Juliana Botero	Comedy	
Nochebuena	Camila Loboguerrero	Ana María Arango, Roxana Blanco, Constanza Camelo	Comedy	Best Actor (Latin Film Competition) at Gramado Film Festival.
Ni te cases ni te embarques	Ricardo Coral	Víctor Hugo Cabrera, Andrea Noceti, Juliana Botero	Comedy	
Helena	Jaime César Espinoza	Lina Constanza López, Jorge Mario Henao, Paulo Arcila	Drama	
La gorra	Andrés Lozano	Diego Yances, Alejandro Rojas, Dayana Abad	Drama	
Alborada carmesí	Luis Reina	Ruddy Rodríguez, Zharick León, Constanza Camelo	Thriller	
2009
La pasión de Gabriel	Luis Restrepo	Andrés Parra, María Cecilia Sánchez, Jorge Rodriguez	Drama	Best Actor (Colombian Cinema Award) at Cartagena Film Festival. Best Actor at Guadalajara International Film Festival. Won Special Jury Prize at Warsaw International Film Festival.
Dr. Alemán	Tom Schreiber	August Diehl, Marleyda Soto, Andrés Parra	Drama	German-Colombian co-production. Special Mention and nominated for Editing Award at Film+ Awards. Best Screenplay (Unproduced) at German Film Awards. Best Editing at German Film Critics Association Awards. Nominated for Crystal Globe at Karlovy Vary International Film Festival. Nominated for Director at New Faces Awards. Nominated for Golden Spike at Valladolid International Film Festival. Nominated for Best International Feature Film at Zurich Film Festival.
Rabia	Sebastián Cordero	Martina García, Gustavo Sánchez Parra, Tania de la Cruz	Romance, thriller	Mexican-Spanish-Colombian co-production. Best Cinematography at Guadalajara Mexican Film Festival. Best Film, Special Mention (Actor) and nominated for Supporting Actor and Cinematography at Málaga Spanish Film Festival. Won Special Jury Prize and nominated for Tokyo Grand Prize at Tokyo International Film Festival.
Del amor y otros demonios	Hilda Hidalgo	Pablo Derqui, Eliza Triana, Jordi Dauder	Drama	Costa Rican-Colombian co-production. Best Art Direction at Cine Ceará. Nominated for Golden Starfish Award (Narrative Feature) at Hamptons International Film Festival.
Amar a morir	Fernando Lebrija	José María de Tavira, Martina García, Alberto Estrella	Drama	Mexican-Colombian co-production. Nominated for Best Director at Imagen Foundation Awards. Best Spanish Language Film at Santa Barbara International Film Festival.
Contracorriente	Javier Fuentes-León	Cristian Mercado, Manolo Cardona, Tatiana Astengo	Drama	Peruvian-Colombian-French-German co-production. Nominated for Best Film at Cartagena Film Festival. Won Audience Choice Award at Chicago Latino Film Festival. Nominated for Outstanding Film (Limited Release) at GLAAD Media Awards. Nominated for Film of the Year at Dorian Awards. Nominated for Best Spanish Language Foreign Film at Goya Awards. Best Unpublished Screenplay at Havana Film Festival. Outstanding Artistic Achievement at Outfest. Won Audience Award at Lima International Film Festival. Won Audience Award and nominated for Grand Jury Prize (Ibero-American Competition) at Miami International Film Festival. Won Audience Award (Best Feature) at Provincetown International Film Festival. Best First Feature at San Francisco International Lesbian & Gay Film Festival. Won Sebastiane Award at San Sebastián International Film Festival. Won Audience Award and Grand Jury Prize for World Cinema (Dramatic) at Sundance Film Festival.
Los viajes del viento	Ciro Guerra	Marciano Martínez, Yull Núñez, Agustin Nieves	Drama, music	Colombian-German-Argentine-Dutch co-production. Best Colombian Film and Best Director at Bogota Film Festival. Won Award of the City of Rome and nominated for Un Certain Regard Award at Cannes Film Festival. Best Director, Film and Colombian Film at Cartagena Film Festival. Best Spanish Language Film at Santa Barbara International Film Festival.
El arriero	Guillermo Calle	Julián Díaz, Paula Castaño, María Cecilia Sánchez	Drama	Colombian-Spanish co-production. Nominated for Best Film at Cartagena Film Festival.
La sangre y la lluvia	Jorge Navas	Gloria Montoya, Quique Mendoza, Juan Miguel Silva	Drama	Colombian-Argentine co-production. Best Actress and Screenplay at Cartagena Film Festival. Nominated for Grand Prix at Fribourg International Film Festival. Nominated for Grand Jury Prize (Ibero-American Competition) at Miami International Film Festival. Won Cinema and the City Award and nominated for Golden Alexander at Thessaloniki Film Festival.
Hiroshima	Pablo Stoll	Juan Andrés Stoll, Mario Stoll, Guillermo Stoll	Drama	Uruguayan-Colombian-Argentine-Spanish co-production. Special Mention (Best Ibero-American Film) at Mar del Plata Film Festival.
El vuelco del cangrejo	Óscar Ruiz	Arnobio Salazar Rivas, Rodrigo Vélez, Karent Hinestroza	Drama	Colombian-French co-production. Won FIPRESCI Prize (Forum) at Berlin International Film Festival. Special Mention for FEISAL Award at Buenos Aires International Festival of Independent Cinema. Nominated for Best Film at Cartagena Film Festival. Won E-Changer Award and nominated for Grand Prix at Fribourg International Film Festival. Won Cidade de Gramado Trophy and Kikito Critics Prize (Latin Film Competition) at Gramado Film Festival. Won Special Jury Prize (First Work) at Havana Film Festival. Best First Time Director at Las Palmas Film Festival. Nominated for Grand Jury Prize (Ibero-American Competition) at Miami International Film Festival. Best Ensemble Cast at RiverRun International Film Festival.
Día naranja	Alejandra Szeplaki	Martín Borisenko, Martina García, Bernarda Pagés	Comedy, romance	Venezuelan-Colombian-Argentine co-production. Nominated for Golden Crow Pheasant at Kerala International Film Festival.
El cielos	Alessandro Basile	Salvatore Basile, Ira Frontén, Carmenza Gómez	Comedy	
El man, el superhéroe nacional	Harold Trompetero	Bernardo García, Aida Bossa, Fernando Solórzano	Comedy	
In fraganti	Juan Camilo Pinzón	Jairo Camargo, César Mora, Natalia París	Comedy	
Cuarenta	Carlos Fernández de Soto	Blas Jaramillo, Nicolás Montero, Monica Pardo	Drama	
Amanecer	Alvaro D. Ruiz	Matias Stevens, Jessica Chapnik		Australian-Colombian co-production
Sins of My Father	Nicolas Entel		Documentary	Argentine-Colombian co-production
El amanecer	Juan David Castilla	Rodrigo Alfonso, Laura Arias, Gio Baglioni	Crime, drama, thriller	Colombian-American co-production

== 2010s ==
Title	Director	Cast	Genre	Notes
2010
Los colores de la montaña	Carlos Arbeláez	Hernán Ocampo, Nolberto Sánchez, Genaro Aristizábal	Drama	Colombian-Panamanian co-production. Best Colombian Film and nominated for Best Film at Bogota Film Festival. Nominated for Best Film at Cartagena Film Festival. Won Audience Award, Ecumenical Jury Award and nominated for Grand Prix at Fribourg International Film Festival. Won Golden Crow Pheasant at Kerala International Film Festival. Best Screenplay at Los Angeles Latino International Film Festival. Nominated for Grand Prize (World Cinema) at Skip City International D-Cinema Festival.
Plata o plomo	John Human	Johnny Acero, Marlon Vasgavi, Margarita Palacio	Drama	Colombian-American co-production
Una hora más en Canarias	David Serrano	Quim Gutiérrez, Angie Cepeda, Juana Acosta	Comedy, musical	Spanish-Colombian co-production
Federal	Erik de Castro	Michael Madsen, Carolina Gómez, Selton Mello	Drama, thriller	Brazilian-French-Colombian co-production
El paseo	Harold Trompetero	Antonio Sanint, Carolina Gómez, María Margarita Giraldo	Comedy	
El jefe	Jaime Escallón-Buraglia	Marcela Benjumea, Mirta Busnelli, Carlos Hurtado	Comedy	Canadian-Colombian-Argentine co-production
La sociedad del semáforo	Rubén Mendoza	Abelardo Jaimes, Gala Restrepo, Romelia Cajiao	Drama	Colombian-French co-production
Sin tetas no hay paraiso	Gustavo Bolivar	Isabel Cristina Cadavid, Juan Sebastián Calero, Francisco Bolívar, Linda Lucía Callejas, Linda Baldrich, Ramiro Meneses, Santiago Moure, Óscar Borda, Gregorio Pernia, Miguel Varoni, Herbert King	Drama	
Retratos en un mar de mentiras	Carlos Gaviria	Paola Baldion, Julián Román, Edgardo Román	Drama	Best Actress at Amiens International Film Festival. Best Feature Film at Austin International Film Festival of the Americas. Nominated for Best Feature Film (Generation 14plus) at Berlin International Film Festival. Best Film at Bogota Film Festival. Best First Work and nominated for Best Film at Cartagena Film Festival. Nominated for Best Film at Giffoni Film Festival. Best Film and Actress (Ibero-American Jury) at Guadalajara Mexican Film Festival. Won Golden Crow Pheasant at Kerala International Film Festival. Best Actor and nominated for Best Film at Los Angeles Latino International Film Festival. Nominated for Best Film (International) at New York Latino Film Festival. Won Audience Award (Meeting Point Section: Feature Film) at Valladolid International Film Festival. Best Film at Viña del Mar Film Festival.
García	José Luis Rugeles	Damián Alcázar, Margarita Rosa de Francisco, Fabio Restrepo	Comedy, drama	Colombian-Brazilian co-production. Best Actress (Latin Film Competition) at Gramado Film Festival.
Una y otra vez	Ricardo Islas	Ernie González Jr., Marina Huizar, José María Mendiola	Drama, family, history	American-Colombian co-production
Los extraños presagios de León Prozak	Carlos Santa	Various dubbing actors	Animation	
Los futbolistas	Juan Falla	Guido Molina, Indhira Serrano, Pedro Luis Falla	Action	
El gran Sadini	Gonzalo Mejía	Sebastián Arango, Fausto Cabrera, Jairo Camargo	Drama	
El gancho	Sandra Higuita		Drama	
Decembrina	Edwin Daniel Díaz	Angelica Prieto, Alma Rodríguez, Javier Ortiz	Drama	
Los últimos malos días de Guillermino	Gloria Nancy Monsalve	Cristian Fernando Osorio, Daniel Betancourt, Edward Betancourt	Family, fantasy	
Apaporis	Antonio Dorado		Documentary	
2011
El callejón	Antonio Trashorras	Ana de Armas, Diego Cadavid, Leonor Varela	Action, horror, thriller	Spanish-Colombian co-production
El cartel de los sapos	Carlos Moreno	Manolo Cardona, Tom Sizemore, Juana Acosta	Crime, drama	
La cara oculta	Andy Baiz	Quim Gutiérrez, Martina García, Clara Lago	Mystery, thriller	Colombian-Spanish co-production
Sexo, mentiras y muertos	Ramiro Meneses	Andrea López, Juan Pablo Shuk, Martha Bolaños	Crime, romance	
Con amor o sin amor	David Serrano	Angie Cepeda, Juana Acosta, Quim Gutiérrez	Comedy, romance	
El páramo	Jaime Osorio Márquez	Juan Pablo Barragán, Alejandro Aguilar, Mauricio Navas	Horror, thriller	Colombian-Argentine-Spanish co-production. Best Screenplay at Guadalajara Mexican Film Festival. Nominated for Best of Punchon at Puchon International Fantastic Film Festival.
Volver a morir	Miguel Urrutia	Andrea Montenegro, Luis Fernando Bohórquez	Horror, thriller	
Porfirio	Alejandro Landes	Porfirio Ramírez, Jarlinsson Ramírez, Yor Jasbleidy Santos	Comedy, drama	Colombian-Argentine-Uruguayan-Spanish co-production. Best Actor and won Special Jury Prize at Biarritz Film Festival. Best Director and nominated for Best Film at Cartagena Film Festival. Best Film at International Film Festival of India. Nominated for Flash Forward Award at Pusan International Film Festival. Nominated for Horizons Award at San Sebastián International Film Festival. Special Mention at Thessaloniki Film Festival. Nominated for Competition 1-2 Award at Warsaw International Film Festival.
Saluda al diablo de mi parte	Juan Felipe Orozco	Édgar Ramírez, Ricardo Vélez, Carolina Gómez	Action, thriller	Colombian-Mexican-American co-production
Karen llora en un bus	Gabriel Rojas	Edgar Alexen, Emerson Rodríguez, Margarita Rosa Gallardo	Drama	Nominated for Best Film at Cartagena Film Festival. Best New Director at Huelva Latin American Film Festival.
Pescador	Sebastián Cordero	Andrés Crespo, Alejandro Fajardo, María Cecilia Sánchez	Drama	Ecuadorian-Colombian co-production. Nominated for Best Latin-American Film at Ariel Award. Best Actor at Cartagena Film Festival. Best Actor and Director at Guadalajara Mexican Film Festival. Nominated for Knight Ibero-American Competition at Miami International Film Festival.
Lecciones para un beso	Juan Pablo Bustamante	Cristina Umaña, José Julián Gaviria, Vanessa Galvis	Comedy, romance	
Todos tus muertos	Carlos Moreno	John Alex Castillo, Harold Devasten, Jorge Herrera	Comedy, drama	Best Director and nominated for Best Film at Bogotá Film Festival. Nominated for Best Film at Cartagena Film Festival. Nominated for Knight Ibero-American Competition at Miami International Film Festival. Nominated for Best Feature Film at Neuchâtel International Fantasy Film Festival. Nominated for Best Feature at Oslo Films from the South Festival. Nominated for Tiger Award at Rotterdam International Film Festival. Won Cinematography Award and nominated for Grand Jury Prize (World Cinema - Dramatic) at Sundance Film Festival.
Patas arriba	Alejandro García Wiedemann	Gonzalo Camacho, Lourdes Valera, Erich Wildpret	Family	Colombian-Venezuelan-Portuguese co-production
Silencio en el paraíso	Colbert García	Francisco Bolívar, Linda Baldrich, Esmeralda Pinzón	Drama	Best Latin-American Director and Film at Málaga Spanish Film Festival.
Poker	Juan Sebastián Valencia	Luis Fernando Hoyos, Rafael Novoa, Juan Sebastian Aragón	Drama	
El escritor de telenovelas	Felipe Dotheé	Mijail Mulkay, Joemy Blanco, Álvaro Bayona	Comedy, romance	
Postales colombianas	Ricardo Coral	Luz Stella Luengas, Adriana Campos, Alexandra Escobar	Comedy, drama	
Kennedy's Crimes	Hugo Santander	Francisco Sanabria, Adriana Hoyos, Luz Helena Wilches	Crime, drama, thriller	Colombian-Indian co-production
Hamlet	Hugo Santander	Hugo Santander, Lori Rolinski, Roger Wilks	Drama	Colombian-Indian co-production
La vida era en serio	Mónica Borda	Cristina Umaña, Patricia Castañeda, Juan Pablo Gamboa	Drama	
Mamá tómate la sopa	Mario Ribero Ferreira	Ricardo Leguizamo, Consuelo Luzardo, Paola Turbay	Comedy	
En coma	Henry Rivero, Juan David Restrepo	Juan David Restrepo, Liliana Vanegas, Juan Pablo Raba	Drama	
Locos	Harold Trompetero	César Badillo, Marcela Carvajal, Julio César Herrera	Comedy, drama, romance	
2012
Gordo, calvo y bajito	Carlos Osuna	Álvaro Bayona, Fernando Arévalo, Julio Medina, Jairo Camargo, Ernesto Benjumea, Nicolás Montero, Sandra Reyes, Marcela Mar, Juan Manuel Combariza, Elkin Díaz	Animation	Special Mention (Free Spirit Award) at Warsaw International Film Festival
Aluna	Alan Ereira		Documentary	Colombian-British co-production
Operación E	Miguel Courtois	Luis Tosar, Martina García	Drama	Spanish-French-Colombian co-production
Hamlet Unbound	Hugo Santander	Hugo Santander, Lori Rolinski, Roger Wilks	Drama	Colombian-American-Indian co-production
Carmen G	Hernán Herrera	Pierangeli Llinas, María Cecilia Sánchez, Reid Andres	Drama, thriller	
La Playa DC	Juan Andrés Arango	Luis Carlos Guevara, Jamés Solís, Andrés Murillo	Drama	Colombian-French-Brazilian co-production. Nominated for Golden Camera and Un Certain Regard Award at Cannes Film Festival. Nominated for Gold Hugo (New Directors Competition) at Chicago International Film Festival. Nominated for Outstanding International Motion Picture at Image Award.
La Lectora	Riccardo Gabrielli	Carolina Guerra, Diego Cadavid, Carolina Gómez	Action, drama, thriller	
Colosio: El asesinato	Carlos Bolado	José María Yazpik, Daniel Giménez Cacho, Kate del Castillo	Action, drama, thriller	Mexican-Spanish-French-Colombian co-production. Best Supporting Actor and Make-Up and nominated for Best Supporting Actor and Visual Effects at Ariel Award. Nominated for Best Supporting Actress and Editing at Mexican Cinema Journalists. Best Latin American Actor at Málaga Spanish Film Festival.
La sirga	William Vega	Floralba Achicanoy, Joghis Seudin Arias, David Fernando Guacas	Drama	Colombian-French-Mexican co-production
El paseo 2	Harold Trompetero	John Leguizamo, Karen Martínez, María Gabriela de Faría	Comedy	
180 Segundos	Alexander Giraldo	Alejandro Aguilar, Angélica Blandón, Manuel Sarmiento	Action	Nominated for Ibero-American Opera Prima Award at Miami International Film Festival.
Días de vinilo	Gabriel Nesci	Gastón Pauls, Fernán Mirás, Ignacio Toselli	Comedy	Argentine-Colombian co-production. Nominated for Best Supporting Actor at Argentine Academy of Cinematography Arts and Sciences. Nominated for Best Supporting Actress at Argentinean Film Critics Association Awards. Nominated for Knight Ibero-American Competition at Miami International Film Festival.
WWW.	Javier Díez Moro	Javier Páez, Aranzazu Diez, María Luisa San José	Crime, drama, mystery	Spanish-Chinese-Colombian-French-German-Greek-Italian-American-Ukrainian co-production
Lo azul del cielo	Juan Uribe	Aldemar Correa, María Gaviria, John Alex Toro	Drama, romance, thriller	
Chocó	Jhonny Hendrix	Esteban Copete, Karent Hinestroza, Sebastián Mosqueira	Drama	Nominated for Best Film at Cartagena Film Festival
Sin palabras	Diego Bustamante, Ana Sofía Osorio	Xuan Liao, Javier Ortiz, Ada Vergara De Solano	Drama, romance	Nominated for Ibero-American Opera Prima Award at Miami International Film Festival.
Campo de amapolas	Juan Carlos Guevara	Luis Burbano Burgos, Carlos Hualpa, Luis Lozano	Drama	Nominated for Competition 1-2 Award at Warsaw International Film Festival.
Sanandresito	Alessandro Angulo	Verónica Orozco, Andrés Parra, Jimmy Vasquez	Comedy, thriller	
El faro	Luis Fernando Bottía	Karent Hinestroza, Andrés Castañeda, Petrona Martínez	Drama, mystery, romance	
Apatía, una película de carretera	Arturo Ortegón	Quique Mendoza, Javier Gardeazábal, María Dalmazzo	Adventure	
Sofía y el terco	Andrés Burgos	Carmen Maura, Gustavo Angarita, Constanza Duque	Comedy, drama	Won Audience Award at Biarritz Film Festival
Sin otoño, sin primavera	Iván Mora Manzano	Enzo Macchiavello, Andres Troya Holst, Paola Baldion	Drama	Ecuadorian-Colombian-French co-production. Nominated for Ibero-American Opera Prima Award at Miami Film Festival. Nominated for Best Feature Film at São Paulo International Film Festival. Nominated for Competition 1-2 Award at Warsaw International Film Festival.
Por qué dejaron a Nacho?	Fernando Ayllón	Francisco Bolívar, Edmundo Troya, José Manuel Ospina	Comedy	
El resquicio	Alfonso Acosta	Maruia Shelton, Alan Daicz, Fiona Horsey	Horror	Colombian-Argentine co-production. Won Youth Jury Award and nominated for Best Feature Film at Neuchâtel International Fantastic Film Festival. Nominated for Best Feature Film at São Paulo International Film Festival.
Edificio Royal	Iván Wild	Jorge Perugorría, Katherine Vélez, Adel David Vasquez	Drama	American-Colombian co-production. Nominated for Ibero-American Opera Prima Award at Miami Film Festival.
La captura	Dago García, Juan Carlos Vásquez	Álvaro Bayona, Juan Sebastián Caicedo, Juan Pablo Franco	Drama	
Con Elizabeth en Mount Dora	Jhonny Obando	Julio Coutinho, Scarlet Gruber, Karin Farfan	Adventure, comedy, drama	Ecuadorian-American-Colombian-Brazilian co-production
La montaña	Alethia Stendal, Lisa Stendal	Samuel Hernández, Alexander Ramírez, Russell Stendal Jr.	Drama	
Cecilia	Verónica Rodríguez	Sergio Arévalo, Juan Pablo Coronel, Ernesto Mazoni	Drama, fantasy	Colombian-Argentine co-production
Flea Market Finish Line	Ika Santamaria	Anthony Feijoo, Glenda Galeano, Vivi González	Drama	Colombian-American co-production
Mi gente linda, mi gente bella	Harold Trompetero	Sara Corrales, Brenda Hanst, Connor McShannon	Comedy	
Carrusel	Guillermo Iván	Danna García, Gustavo Ángel, Valentina Acosta	Comedy, drama	
Pequeños vagos	Carlos Zapata	María Cecilia Sánchez, Omar Vega, Iván Alzate	Comedy, romance	
Expediente: La Noche	Antonio Merlano	Carlos Aguilar, Braian Eduardo Villa, Fernando Cárdenas	Horror, mystery	
2013
Crónica del fin del mundo	Mauricio Cuervo	Claudia Aguirre, Ángel Vásquez Aguirre, Victor Hugo Morant	Drama	
Bolaetrapo	Guillermo Iván	Antonio Merlano, Guillermo Iván, Lorena Álvarez	Comedy	Mexican-American-Colombian co-production
Anina	Alfredo Soderguit	Federica Lacaño, María Mendive, César Troncoso, Cristina Morán, Petru Valenski, Roberto Suárez	Animation	Uruguayan-Colombian co-production. Nominated for Best Latin-American Film at Ariel Award. Won Audience Award (International Official Selection) and nominated for Best Film at Buenos Aires International Festival of Independent Cinema. Nominated for Cine Latino Award at Palm Springs International Film Festival. Nominated for Best Animation Film and Camilo Vives Best Iberoamerican Coproduction at The Platino Awards for Iberoamerican Cinema.
Roa	Andy Baiz	César Bordón, Jose Luis Garcia Campos, Nicolás Cancino	Drama	Colombian-Argentine co-production. Nominated for Cine Latino Award at Palm Springs International Film Festival. Nominated for Best Film at The Platino Awards for Iberoamerican Cinema.
Secreto de confesión	Henry Rivero	Juan Pablo Raba, Marlon Moreno, Luigi Sciamanna	Crime, drama, thriller	Venezuelan-Colombian co-production
Nothing Against Life	Julio Ramírez	Cynthia Geary, Fernando Noriega, Hilary Pickles	Drama	Colombian-American co-production
Crimen con vista al mar	Gerardo Herrero	Jorge Enrique Abello, Luis Fernando Hoyos, Carmelo Gómez	Drama, thriller	Colombian-Spanish co-production
Deshora	Barbara Sarasola-Day	Luis Ziembrowski, Alejandro Buitrago, María Ucedo	Drama	Argentine-Colombian-Norwegian co-production
Jirafas	Enrique Álvarez	Yasmani Guerrero, Olivia Manrufo, Claudia Muñiz	Drama	Panamanian-Cuban-Colombian co-production
Cazando luciérnagas	Roberto Flores Prieto	Marlon Moreno, Valentina Abril	Drama, family	Nominated for Gold Hugo (New Directors Competition) at Chicago International Film Festival. Won Best Director, Actress, Screenplay, Cinematography (Latin Film Competition) and Best Cinematography (International Competition) at Gramado Film Festival. Best Actor and Cinematography at Huelva Latin American Film Festival.
The Shifting	Julio Saldarriaga	Carlos Acuña, Matthew Alan, Felix Avitia	Action, drama	
De Rolling por Colombia	Harold Trompetero	Andrés López, Natalia Durán, Jimmy Vásquez	Comedy	
Amores peligrosos	José Antonio Dorado	Marlon Moreno, Juanita Arias, Kathy Sáenz	Drama, thriller	
Estrella del sur	Gabriel González Rodríguez	Carolina Galeano, Alejandro Prieto, Julieth Restrepo	Drama	
Secretos	Fernando Ayllón	Viviana Santos, Francisco Bolívar, Lina Castrillón	Thriller	
El paseo 3	Juan Camilo Pinzón	Alberto Barrero, Claudia Liliana González, Margálida Castro	Comedy	
Justicia ciega	Jhonny Obando	Carla López, Mercedes Christian, Lino Ferrer	Drama, thriller	
La justa medida	Colbert García	Patrick Delmas, Cristina Campuzano, Alejandro Aguilar	Comedy	
Señoritas	Lina Rodríguez	María Serrano, Clara Monroy, Angela Katherine Laverde	Drama	Colombian-Canadian coproduction
El control	Felipe Dothée	Christian Tappan, César Mora, Alina Lozano	Comedy	
Gallows Hill	Víctor Garcia	Peter Facinelli, Sophia Myles, Nathalia Ramos	Horror	Spanish-Colombian co-production
2014
Out of the Dark	Lluís Quílez	Julia Stiles, Scott Speedman, Stephen Rea	Horror, thriller	American-Colombian-Spanish co-production
Mateo	María Gamboa	Carlos Hernández, Felipe Botero, Samuel Lazcano	Drama	Colombian-French co-production. Won Ibero-American Opera Prima Award and Jordan Alexander Kressler Screenwriting Award at Miami Film Festival. Nominated for Best Feature Film (Children's Jury Main Prize and Golden Slipper) at Zlín International Film Festival for Children and Youth.
El elefante desaparecido	Javier Fuentes-León	Salvador del Solar, Angie Cepeda, Lucho Cáceres	Mystery, thriller	Peruvian-Colombian-Spanish co-production
Los hongos	Óscar Ruiz Navia	Jovan Alexis Marquinez, Calvin Buenaventura, Atala Estrada	Drama	Colombian-French-German-Argentine co-production. Won Special Jury Prize and nominated for Golden Leopard at Locarno International Film Festival. Won Hubert Bals Fund Lions Film Award at Rotterdam International Film Festival. Nominated for Tokyo Grand Prix at Tokyo International Film Festival.
Gente de bien	Franco Lolli	Brayan Santamaría, Carlos Fernando Pérez, Alejandra Borrero	Drama	Colombian-French co-production. Nominated for Critics Week Grand Prize and Golden Camera at Cannes Film Festival. Nominated for Audience Choice Award at Chicago International Film Festival. Best Film at Ghent International Film Festival. Won Horizons Award (Special Mention) at San Sebastián International Film Festival.
Ciudad Delirio	Chus Gutiérrez	Carolina Ramírez, Julián Villagrán, Ingrid Rubio	Comedy, romance	Colombian-Spanish co-production
Manos sucias	Josef Wladyka	Cristian James Abvincula, Jarlin Javier Martínez	Drama, thriller	Colombian-American co-production. Nominated for Best Editing and Best First Feature Film at Independent Spirit Awards. Best Actor at Huelva Latin American Film Festival. Nominated for New Directors Prize at San Francisco International Film Festival. Best New Narrative Director at Tribeca Film Festival.
Refugiado	Diego Lerman	Julieta Díaz, Sebastián Molinaro, Marta Lubos	Drama	Argentine-Colombian-French-Polish co-production. Won Silver Hugo (Special Jury Prize) at Chicago International Film Festival.
Tierra en la lengua	Rubén Mendoza	Richard Córdoba, Gabriel Mejía, Alma Rodríguez	Drama	Nominated for Best Feature at Oslo Films from the South Festival. Best Film at Cartagena Film Festival
Climas	Enrica Pérez	Fiorella de Ferrari, Claudia Ruiz del Castillo, Maria Unocc	Drama	Peruvian-Colombian co-production. Nominated for Competition 1-2 Award at Warsaw International Film Festival.
Carta al niño Dios	Juan Camilo Pinzón	Diana Ángel, Luis Jherver, Damián Maldonado	Comedy	
Live Life Dearest	Juan Diego Escobar	Various dubbing actors	Experimental	
Love Film Festival	Juancho Cardona, Vinicius Coimbra, Manuela Dias, Bruno Safadi	Manolo Cardona, Leandra Leal, Nanda Costa	Drama, romance	Brazilian-Colombian-Portuguese-American co-production
Espejos	César Manzano	Carlos Camacho, Luis Fernández, Claudia La Gatta	Drama	Venezuelan-Colombian co-production
Piloto	William S. Goldstein, Alberto Marenco	Ace Marrero, Stephania Borge, Salvatore Basile	Action, drama, thriller	
Souvenir	Andrés Cuevas	Lorena Andrade, Luna Baxter, Vanessa Chaplot	Comedy, romance	
Demental	David Bohórquez	Juanita Arias, Julio Correal, Brigitte Hernández	Thriller	
Por un puñado de pelos	Néstor Montalbano	Norma Argentina, Jorge Blanco, Norma Carrizo	Comedy	Colombian-Argentine co-production
Estrella quiero ser	Gustavo Nieto Roa	Zulma Rey, Lincoln Palomeque, Tatiana De los Rios	Drama	
Saudó	Jhonny Hendrix	Stephania Borge, Luis Felipe Cortez, Robin Abonia	Suspense, drama, thriller	
Todas para uno	Harold Trompetero	Santiago Alarcón, Jessica Cediel, María Elena Döehring	Comedy	
Desterrada	Diego Guerra	Mónica Chávez, Ricardo Mejía, Natalia Reyes, Santiago Olaya, Jim Muñoz	Animation	
Tiempo perdido	Alexander Giraldo	Alejandro Aguilar, Angélica Blandón, Manuel Sarmiento	Drama	
Ruido Rosa	Roberto Flores Prieto	Roosevel González, Mabel Pizarro	Drama	Nominated for Golden Hugo at Chicago International Film Festival. Best Actress at Huelva Latin American Film Festival. Nominated for Independent Camera at Karlovy Vary International Film Festival.
Mangostas	Alejandro Castro Jaramillo	Matías Asenjo, Virginia Carceller, Rodrigo Castañeda	Drama, mystery	Argentine-Colombian co-production
11 grados de culpa	Yesid Leone	Roberto Escobar, Luzma González, María Gaviria	Drama	
De Rolling 2: Por el sueño mundialista	Harold Trompetero	Andrés López, Julio Pachón	Comedy	
Nos vamos pal mundial	Fernando Ayllón, Andrés Orjuela Bustillo	Nelson Polanía, José Manuel Ospina, Maru Yamayusa	Comedy	
Default	Simon Brand	David Oyelowo, Greg Callahan, Katherine Moennig	Thriller	American-Colombian co-production
Uno al año no hace daño	Juan Camilo Pinzón	Waldo Urrego, Aida Morales, Ernesto Benjumea	Comedy	
Train Station	42 directors	Hamdi al Saaidi, Lance Alan, Elnaz Amiri	Crime, drama, thriller	American-Colombian-Iranian-Kenian-German-Romanian-Spanish-Chinese-British-Greek-Japanese-South African-Portuguese-Emirati-Indian-Brazilian-Filipino-Italian-Argentine-Hong Kongese-Malaysian-Norwegian co-production
5	Riccardo Gabrielli	Andrew Ayala, Bautista Duarte, Carolina Guerra	Thriller	Also known as Cinco.
Las malas lenguas	Juan Paulo Laserna Arias	Sara Montoya, Félix Antequera, Maryuri Sánchez, Matilde de Los Milagros Londoño, Pedro Mejia	Drama, family	American-Colombian co-production
Fábula de una conspiración	Carlos Varela	Lali Gonzalez, Lara Corrochano	Action	
The Broken Legacy	Miguel Garzón	Maria Olsen, Justine Herron, Michael Keeley	Drama, romance	American-Colombian co-production
Petecuy, the Movie	Óscar Hincapié	César Mora, Cristóbal Errázuriz, Alejandro Buenaventura	Comedy, drama	
Mentes en fuga	Diego Henao	Juan Diego Puentes, Milagros Michael, Andrea Gómez	Drama	Nominated for Best Film at Bogota Film Festival
Dos aguas	Patricia Velásquez	Ismael Brown, Ariel Arguedas, Gladys Alzate	Drama	Costa Rican-Colombian co-production. Nominated for Encuentros Award at Miami Film Festival.
City of Dead Men	Kirk Sullivan	Diego Boneta, Jackson Rathbone, María Mesa	Horror, thriller	American-Colombian
Leidi	Simón Mesa Soto		Drama	
NN	Héctor Gálvez		Drama	Peruvian-Colombian-German-French co-production
Poppy Garden	Juan Carlos Melo Guevara		Drama	
2015
La semilla del silencio	Juan Felipe Cano	Angie Cepeda, Andrés Parra, Julián Román	Crime, drama, thriller	
La sargento Matacho	William González	Fabiana Medina, Damián Alcázar, Marlon Moreno	Action, drama	Colombian-Mexican-Spanish-Australian co-production
Bastards y Diablos	A. D. Freese	Juanita Arias, Dillon Porter, Andrew Perez	Adventure	American-Colombian co-production. Nominated for US Fiction Award at Los Angeles Film Festival.
Violencia	Jorge Forero	David Aldana, Nelson Camayo, Rodrigo Vélez	Drama	Colombian-Mexican co-production
El encuentro de Guayaquil	Nicolás Capelli	Anderson Ballesteros, Pablo Echarri, Naiara Awada	History	Colombian-Argentine co-production
Sin mover los labios	Carlos Osuna	Fernando Arevalo, Álvaro Bayona, Marcela Benjumea	Comedy, drama	
Nacimiento	Martín Mejía Rugeles	Yuliana Ríos, Juan Daniel Gil, Maria Moyano, Hernando Naranjo	Drama	Won FIPRESCI Award, and Best First Feature Film Award at Tallinn Black Nights Film Festival. Nominated for Best Film in the New Directors Competition of São Paulo International Film Festival. Nominated for Best Directorial Debut at the Camerimage Film Festival, Poland.
Presos	Esteban Ramírez	Natalia Arias, Leynar Gomez, Alejandro Aguilar	Drama	
Tres escapularios	Felipe Aljure	Mauricio Flórez, Karen Gaviria, Luis Fernando Gil	Crime, drama	
Dos mujeres y una vaca	Efraín Bahamón	Juan Pablo Barragán, Ana María Estupiñán, Luisa Huertas	Drama	
Las tetas de mi madre	Carlos Zapata	Paula Matura, Billy Heins, Santiago Heins	Drama	
La tierra y la sombra	César Augusto Acevedo	Haimer Leal, Hilda Ruiz, Edison Raigosa	Drama	Colombian-French-Dutch-Chilean-Brazilian co-production. Won Golden Camera Award and nominated for Critics Week Grand Prize at Cannes Film Festival.
El abrazo de la serpiente	Ciro Guerra	Nilbio Torres, Antonio Bolívar, Jan Bijvoet, Brionne Davis	Adventure, drama	Nominated for Best Foreign Language Film at the Academy Awards. Won Art Cinema Award (Directors' Fortnight) at Cannes Film Festival. Nominated for Best International Film at Independent Spirit Awards. Nominated for Best International Film at Munich Film Festival. Nominated for Best Latin-American Film at San Sebastián International Film Festival. Golden Astor for Best Film at Mar del Plata International Film Festival.
Alias María	José Luis Rugeles	Karen Torres, Anderson Gómez, Erik Ruiz	Drama, war	Colombian-Argentine co-production. Nominated for Un Certain Regard Award at Cannes Film Festival.
¡Que viva la música!	Carlos Moreno	Paulina Dávila, Christian Tappan, Nelson Camayo Alejandra Ávila, Juan Pablo Barragán, David Cantor	Drama, music	Also known as Liveforever. Colombian-Mexican co-production. Based on the book !Que viva la musica!.
La niña de la buseta	Pedro Pio	Tania Torres, Juan Andrés Chacón	Drama, fiction	
Anna	Jacques Toulemonde Vidal	Juana Acosta, Augustin Legrand, Kolia Abiteboul	Drama	Colombian-French co-production
Fragmentos de amor	Fernando Vallejo	Laura Alemán, Angélica Aragón, José Ángel Bichir, Angélica Blandón, Alfredo de Quesada, Luis Gonzaga, Luis Felipe Cortés, Carlos Serrato, Álvaro Rodríguez	Drama	Colombian-Puerto Rican co-production
La luciérnaga	Ana María Herminda	Carolina Guerra, Olga Segura, Maria Helena Doering	Drama, fantasy, romance	Colombian-American co-production
Blunt Force Trauma	Ken Sanzel	Mickey Rourke, Freida Pinto, Ryan Kwanten	Drama	
Se nos armó la gorda	Fernando Ayllón	Alejandro Gutiérrez, Nelson Polania, Fabiola Posada	Comedy	
Todos se van	Sergio Cabrera	Félix Antequera, María Teresa Carrasco, Caleb Casas	Drama	
Suave el aliento	Augusto Sandino	Gustavo Angarita, Vicky Hernández, Isabel Gaona	Drama	Also known as El espejo silencioso
Regue Chicken	Dago García	(voice dubbing); Michelle Gutty, Javier Rodriguez	Animation	
Antes del fuego	Laura Mora	Mónica Lopera, Luis Fernando Hoyos, Juan Ángel	Drama, thriller	
Shakespeare, los espías de Dios	Dago Garcia	Elkin Diaz, Jaime Barbini, Javier Gardeazabal	Crime, thriller	
La Rectora	Mateo Stivelberg	Nona Mateus, Luis Eduardo Motoa, Jorge Lopez	Drama, fiction	Spain-Colombian co-production
El último aliento	René Castellanos	Gérman Patiño, Laura Londoño, Lincoln Palomeque	Drama, fiction, comedy	
¡Pa!	Harold Trompetero	Julio César Herrera, Noëlle Schonwald, Juan Sebastian Parada	Drama, fiction, comedy	
Ella	Libia Stella Gómez	Humberto Arango, Deisy Marulanda, Reina Sánchez	Drama	
El cartel de la papa	Jaime Escallón Buraglia	Santiago Reyes, Natalia Durán, Carlos Hurtado, Luis Eduardo Arango, Andres Castañeda, Carmenza Cossio, Marcela Benjumea	Comedy	
Guelcom tu Colombia	Ricardo Coral Dorado	Hassam Gómez, Alexandra Restrepo, Iván Gutierrez, Tatiana Leiva	Comedy	
Se nos armó la gorda al doble, Misión las Vegas	Fernando Ayllón	Alejandro Gutiérrez, Nelson Polania, Fabiola Posada	Comedy	
Siempre viva	Klych López	Andrés Parra, Enrique Carriazo, Alejando Aguilar, Laura García, Laura Ramos, Andrea Gómez	Drama	
El coco	Dago García	Gustavo Villanueva, Roberto Lozano, Pedro González, Julián Madrid	Comedy	
El detective marañón	Manuel Sarmiento	Nicole Santamaría, Manuel Sarmiento, Silvia de Dios	Comedy, action	
Uno al año no hace daño 2	Juan Camilo Pinzón	Waldo Urrego, Aida Morales, Ernesto Benjumea	Comedy	
Paisaje indeleble	Jaime Barrios	Hernán Méndez, Luisa Vargas, Ernesto Martinez	Drama	
El silencio del río	Carlos Tribiño	Jhonny Forero, Hernan Méndez, Alberto Cardeño	Drama, thriller	
Corazón de León	Emiliano Caballero	Marlon Moreno, María Nela Sinisterra, Manolo Cardona	Comedy, romance	
Sabogal	Juan José Lozano, Sergio Mejia	Various dubbing actors	Animation	
Two Women and a Cow	Efraín Bahamón	Luisa Huertas, Ana María Estupiñán, Juan Pablo Barragán	Drama	
Rolling Elvis	Gustavo Torres Gil	Julián Salcedo, Maria Dalmazzo, Santiago Olaya	Comedy, family	
Sweet & Vicious	Juan Paulo Laserna	Matilde de Los Milagros, Pedro Mejia, Sara Montoya	Drama, family	American-Colombian co-production
Cord	Pablo González	Laura de Boer, Michael Schumacher, Christian Wewerka	Horror, romance, sci-fi	Colombian-French-German co-production. Nominated for Best Colombian Film at Cartagena Film Festival.
The 33	Patricia Riggen	Antonio Banderas, Rodrigo Santoro, Juliette Binoche	Drama	American-Chilean-Colombian co-production
Días extraños	Juan Sebastián Quebrada	Luna Acosta, Weixiang Cai, Juan Lugo	Drama	Argentine-Colombian co-production
Vivo en el limbo	Dario Armando García	Alex Martinez, Jorge Luis Mejía, Hugo Navarro	Drama	
El acompañante	Pavel Giroud	Camila Arteche, Armando Miguel Gómez, Broselianda Hernández	Drama	Panamanian-French-Colombian-Venezuelan-Cuban co-production. Won Best Screenplay at 17th Havana Film Festival New York.
Moria	Claudio Cataño	Juan Pablo Barragán, Patricia Castañeda, Julieth Restrepo	Drama	
Colombia magia salvaje	Mike Slee		Documentary	
Gabo: The Creation of Gabriel Garcia Marquez	Justin Webster		Documentary	
It All Started at the End	Luis Ospina		Documentary	
2016
Another Forever	Juan Zapata	Daniela Escobar, Marlon Moreno, Peter Ketnath	Drama	Venezuelan-Colombian co-production
Usted no sabe quien soy yo	Andres Felipe Orjuela	Ricardo Quevedo, Aida Morales, Natalia Durán, Juan Manuel Ospina, Abril Schreiber	Comedy	
Siembra	Ángela Osorio, Santiago Lozano	Diego Balanta, Inés Granja, José Luis Preciado, Carol Hurtado, Jhon Javier Ramos	Drama	
Los suicidios de Sara	Miguel Urrutia	Fernando Solórzano, Tatiana Renteria, Oswaldo Salas	Thriller	
El Sacrificio	John Reyes Calderón	Elena Rojas, Hermán Sanchez	Horror	
Piloto	William S. Goldstein, Alberto Marenco	Ace Marrero, Stephania Borge, Salvatore Basile	Action, drama, thriller	
I Believe in Butterflies	Juan Zapata	Daniela Escobar, Peter Ketnath, Marlon Moreno	Drama	Brazilian-American-Colombian co-production
La mujer del animal	Víctor Gaviria	Natalia Polo, Tito Alexander Gomez	Drama	
El juego del amor	Sebastián Vega	Laura Londoño, Valentina Acosta, Juan Alfonso Baptista	Drama, romance	
Hijos de papi	Felipe Martínez Amador	Cristina Umaña, Julieth Restrepo, Michel Brown	Comedy	Colombian-Argentine co-production
El Empantanado: The Muddy	Felipe Echavarria	Diego Cadavid, Paola Mendoza, Mark Schardan	Drama, thriller	American-Colombian co-production
Un caballo llamado Elefante	Andrés Waissbluth	Tomas Arriagada, Salvatore Basile, Ana Sofía Durand	Adventure, biography, fantasy	Chilean-Colombian-Mexican co-production
Between Sea and Land	Manolo Cruz, Carlos del Castillo	Jorge Cao, Manolo Cruz, Vicky Hernández	Drama	Won World Cinema Dramatic Special Jury Award for Acting and World Cinema Audience Award: Dramatic at Sundance Film Festival
Pacífico	Gonzalo Gutiérrez	Manolo Cardona, Christopher Von Uckermann, María Gabriela de Faría	Horror, sci-fi	Colombian-Argentine co-production
Oscuro animal	Felipe Guerrero	Marleyda Soto, Luisa Vides Galiano, Jocelyn Meneses	Drama	Colombian-Argentine co-production
Malcriados	Felipe Martinez	Víctor Mallarino, Julieth Restrepo, Juan Fernando Sánchez, José Restrepo, Andrea Gomez, Marcelo Cezán	Drama, comedy	
El soborno del cielo	Lisandro Duque Naranjo	Germán Jaramillo, Jaime Correa, Martha Osorio, Sara Deray	Drama	
Malos días	Andrés Beltrán	Juan Aguirre, Joe Broderick, Nelson Camayo	Crime, drama, thriller	
Polvo carnavalero	Juan Camilo Pinzón	Rafael Zea, Isabella Córdoba, Patricia Tamayo, Johana Cure, Alfonso Rojas, Beto Villa, Víctor Hugo Morant, Pedro Palacio	Romantic comedy	
Afectuosamente		Jorge Herrera, Amparo Conde	Drama	
Destinos	Alexander Giraldo	Angélica Blandón, Manuel Sarmiento, Alejandro Aguilar, Diego Ramírez Hoyos, Julio Pachón, Jennifer Arenas	Drama	
El lamento	Juan Camilo Pinzón	Humberto Zurita, Marcela Carvajal, Isabel Burr, Ricardo Vesga, Ana María Cuéllar, Ricardo Vélez, Julio Casado, Jairo Camargo	Drama, thriller	
Santa & Andrés	Carlos Lechuga	Jorge Abreu, Lola Amores, Eduardo Martinez	Drama	
Las aventuras de Nuku	Jairo Eduardo Carrillo	(voice dubbing); Andrés Lopez, Cristina Umaña, Martha Liliana Lopez, Jose Manuel Cantor, Paola Peña, Julian Guerra	Adventure, animated	
Jesús	Fernando Guzzoni	Sebastián Ayala, Nicolás Durán, Alejandro Goic	Drama	Chilean-French-German-Greek-Colombian co-production
Los nadie	Juan Sebastián Mesa	Esteban Alcaraz, María Camila Castrillón, María Angélica Puerta	Drama	Won Critics' Week Prize at Venice International Film Festival
This Time Tomorrow (Mañana a esta hora)	Lina Rodríguez	Laura Osma, Maruia Shelton, Francisco Zaldua	Drama	Colombian-Canadian coproduction
Pariente	Iván Gaona	Willington Gordillo, Heriberto Palacio, René Diaz Calderón	Drama, western	
Agente Ñero Ñero Siete	Gabriel Casilimas	Hassam, Jenny Vargas, Cristophe de Geest, Víctor Rodriguez, Yuli Pedraza, Maria Cristina Galvéz	Comedy	
El Paseo 4	Dago Garcia	María Margarita Giraldo, Fernando Solórzano, Juan Carlos Arango, Víctor Tarazona, Manuela Valdés, Adelaida Buscató, Mijail Mulkay, Elizabeth Loaiza, Valeria Chagüi	Comedy	
Chamán: El último guerrero	Sandro Meneses	Wilson Mafla, Germán Cordoba	Adventure	
Pasos de Héroe	Henry Rincón	Federico López, Hector García, Álvaro García	Drama, comedy	
Lamentos	Julián Casanova	Fabián Mendoza, Katheryn Acevedo, Walter Ardila	Horror	
Eso que llaman amor	Carlos Arbeláez	Pedro Julio Arias, Juan David Echeverri, Linsy Holguín	Drama	
X500	Juan Andrés Arango	Jembie Almazan, Jonathan Diaz Angulo, Bernardo Garnica Cruz	Drama	Mexican-Colombian-Canadian co-production
La última tarde	Joel Calero	Katerina D'Onofrio, Lucho Cáceres	Drama	Colombian-Peruvian co-production
Love & Coffee	David Jackson	Anna Hutchison, Taliana Vargas, Nikolás Rincón	Comedy, Romance	American-Colombian co-production
El Amparo	Robert Calzadilla	Giovanny García, Vicente Quintero, Samantha Castillo, Vicente Peña, Rossana Hernández	Drama	
Madre	Simón Mesa Soto		Drama	
2017
La defensa del dragón	Natalia Santa	Fabio Jimenez, Álvaro Robledo, Manuel Navarro Garcia, Sergio Zapata, Gonzalo De Sagarminaga	Drama	Nominated for Golden Camera at 2017 Cannes Film Festival
Demonios tus ojos	Pedro Aguilera	Ivana Baquero, Julio Perillán, Nicolás Coronado	Drama, thriller	Spanish-Colombian co-production
Empeliculados	Diego Bustamante	Alejandro Aguilar, Julian Caicedo, Paula Castaño	Comedy	
Nadie nos mira	Julia Solomonoff	Michael Patrick Nicholson, Katty Velasquez, Paola Baldion	Drama	Argentine-American-Spanish-Brazilian-Colombian co-production
Adiós entusiasmo	Vladimir Durán	Lucas Besasso, Rosario Bléfari, Camilo Castiglione	Drama	Argentine-Colombian co-production
El día de la cabra	Samir Oliveros	Jean Bush, Kiara Howard, Ambrosio Huffington	Comedy, drama	
Tormentero	Rubén Imaz	José Carlos Ruiz, Gabino Rodríguez, Monica Jimenez	Drama, fantasy, mystery	Mexican-Colombian-Dominican co-production
Los Oriyinales	Harold Trompetero	Paola Turbay, Catalina Aristizábal, Diego Trujillo, Nicolás Montero, Marcela Carvajal, Julian Umaña, Cristina Umaña	Comedy	
Usted no sabe quien soy yo 2	Fernando Ayllon Villamor	Ricardo Quevedo, Iván Marín, Freddy Beltran, Aida Morales, Fabio Restrepo, Abril Schreiber, Jimmy Vasquez, Liss Pereira, Bebsabe Duque	Comedy	
Órbita 9	Hatem Khraiche	Clara Lago, Álex González, Andrés Parra, Belén Rueda	Drama, romance, sci-fi	
Operacion Piroberta	René Castellanos	Julian Madrid, Gustavo Villanueva, Jose Luis Mesa, Kenny Astudillo	Comedy	
Perros	Harold Trompetero	John Leguizamo, Álvaro Rodríguez, María Nela Sinisterra, Adriana Barraza, Hernan Méndez, Ramiro Meneses	Drama	
Casa por cárcel	Gustavo Bolivar	Marcela Mar, Gregorio Pernía, Fabian Ríos, Nanis Ochoa, Francisco Bolivar	Comedy	
¿En donde están los ladrones?	Fernando Ayllón	Nelson Polania, Fabiola Posada, Alejandro Gutierrez, Lina Castrillón	Comedy, action	
Mariposas verdes	Gustavo Nieto Roa	Deivi Duarte Paez, Kevin Bury	Drama	
El Caso Watson	Jaime Escallón	Verónica Orozco, Luis Fernando Hoyos, Maria Adelaida Puerta, John Alex Toro, Carlos Hurtado, Roger Moreno, Ricardo Mejía	Drama	
Mamá	Philippe van Hissenhoven	Helena Mallarino, Julieth Restrepo, Alejandra Zuluaga, Consuelo Gacha, Felipe Rojas, Roberto Rojas	Drama	
El país más feliz del mundo	Jaime Escallón	Libardo Zuluaga, Julio César Pachón, Gonzalez, Fermín Vargas, Carlos Humberto Gutiérrez Rangel	Comedy	
Keyla	Viviana Gómez Echeverry	Mercedes Salazar, Norvel Walters, Felipe Cabeza	Action, drama	
Virginia Casta	Claudio Cataño	Juliana Betancourth, José Angel Bichir, Cristina Umaña, Marcela Carvajal, Majida Issa, Aldemar Correa, Hilda Ruiz, Julián Díaz	Drama, romance	
Siete cabezas	Jaime Osorio Márquez	Andrés Castañeda, Philippe Legler, Valentina Gómez	Drama	
El libro de Lila	Marcela Rincón	Sofía Montoya, Antoine Philippard, Estefanía Duque, Leonor González, Jorge Herrera	Adventure	
El Coco 2	Juan Camilo Pinzón	Carlos Sánchez, Julian Madrid, Pedro González, María Auxilio Vélez, Alexandra Restrepo, Roberto Lozano, Gustavo Villanueva, Tahiana Bueno, Juan Guillermo Zapata	Comedy	
Armero	Christian Mantilla	Yuliet Flórez, Benjamín Herrera, Edgar Rojas, Aida Morales, Dámaris Esparza, Alejandro Buenaventura, Mauricio Figueroa, Ariosto Vega, Norida Rodríguez, Humberto Arango, Jaime Serrano, Jenny Gabriela Silva	Drama	
Epifania	Oscar Ruiz Navia	Cecilia Navia, Juanita Escobar, Carmen Ruiz Navia, Manuk Aukan Mejía Ruiz, Ana María Ruiz Navia	Drama	
Agente Ñero, Ñero 7: Comando Jungla	Gabriel Casilimas	Hassam Gómez, Diego León, Mauricio Goyeneche, Luis Fernando Dávila, Neimer González, Jenny Vargas, Christophe De Geest, Violeta Bergonzi	Comedy	
Nadie sabe para quién trabaja	Harold Tompetero	Jessica Cediel, Robinson Díaz, Adolfo Aguilar, Claudio Cataño, Diego Camargo, Francisco Bolivar, Primo Rojas, Diego Mateus, Hernán Mendez, Javier Quintero	Comedy	
El Culebro: La historia de mi papá	Nicolás Casanova	Hernando Casanova, Héctor Ulloa, Carlos Benjumea, Manolo Cardona	Documentary	
El paseo de Teresa	Dago García	César Mora, Margalida Castro, Javier Ramírez, Ella Becerra, Daniela García	Comedy	
De regreso al colegio	Antonio Merlano	Ariel Levy, Carolina Acevedo, Carlos Areces	Comedy	
Una mujer	Camilo Medina Velandia, Daniel Paeres	Daniel Castaño, Diana Giraldo, Sebastián Serrano	Drama	
Talento millonario	Edison Vanegas	Daniel Díaz Cadavid, Elizabeth Minotta, Andres Restrepo	Drama	
El concursante	Carlos Osuna	Kissinger Castillo, Elena Diaz, Daniel Moncada	Comedy	
El Abuelo	Gustavo Saavedra	Carlos Julio Vega, Sebastian Rubio, Javier Valdés	Comedy	Peruvian-Colombian co-production.
Matar a Jesús	Laura Mora	Natasha Jaramillo	Drama	
Virus Tropical	Santiago Caicedo	María Cecilia Sánchez, Martina Toro, Alejandra Borrero	Animated	
2018
Si saben cómo me pongo ¿pa' qué me invitan?	Fernando Ayllón	Ricardo Quevedo, Nelson Polania, Fabiola Posada, Ivan Marin, Freddy Beltran, Liss Pereira, Lina Cardona, Jessica San Juan	Comedy	
Pájaros de verano	Ciro Guerra	Natalia Reyes, Carmiña Martínez, José Acosta, José Vicente Cotes	Drama	Best Film at Motovun Film Festival.
Somos Calentura	Jorge Navas	Steven Grisales, Diego Vivanco	Drama	
Sal	William Vega	Heraldo Romero, Salomón Gómez, Diana Pérez de Guzmán	Drama	Colombian-German-French co-production
Amalia la Secretaria	William Vega	Juan Pablo Barragán, Marcela Benjumea, Fernando Arévalo	Comedia	Colombian-German-French co-production
El juego del ahorcado	Miguel Urrutia	Jason Chad Roth, Andres De La Fuente, Viña Machado	Horror, mystery, thriller	American-Colombian co-production
El man del porno	Mateo Stivelberg	José Restrepo, Silvia Varón Santamaría, Carlos Hurtado, Tata Ariza, Aroha Hafez, Juan Sebastián Calero, Victoria Hernández, Luis Eduardo Arango, Karina Guerra, Sandra Guzmán, César Álvarez, Timothy Janssen, Rodrigo Celis, Ricardo Vesga	Comedy	
El Paseo 5	Mario Rivero	Adriana Ricardo, Waldo Urrego, Jose Daniel Cristancho, Gill González, Ricardo Mejía, Jhon Alex Castillo, Alma Rodríguez, Catalina Londoño, Paola Moreno, Maria Irene Toro	Comedy	
Pickpockets	Peter Webber	Carlos Bardem, Carlos Humberto Camacho, Ulises Gonzalez	Crime, Drama	
Los silencios	Beatriz Seigner	Marleyda Soto, Enrique Diaz, María Paula Tabares Peña	Drama	Brazilian-French-Colombian co-production. Havana Star Prize for Best Actress (Marleyda Soto) at 20th Havana Film Festival New York.
Cómprame un revólver	Julio Hernández Cordón	Ángel Rafael Yanez, Wallace Pereyda, Ángel Leonel Corral	Crime, Drama, Thriller	Mexican-Colombian co-production.
El reality	Rodrigo Triana	Verónica Orozco, Alejandro Gonzalez, Luis Eduardo Arango	Comedy	
Yo, imposible	Patricia Ortega	Lucía Bedoya, Belkis Avilladares, María Elena Duque	Drama	Venezuelan-Colombian co-production.
Niña errante	Rubén Mendoza	Maria Camila Mejía, Lina Marcela Sánchez, Carolina Ramírez, Sofía Paz Jara	Drama	
2019
Fortuna Lake	Felipe Martínez Amador	Estefanía Piñeres, José Restrepo, Daniela Martínez, Carolina Cuervo	Horror	
Boyacoman y la esmeralda perdida	Diego Fernando Ávila	Frey Eduardo Quintero, Juancho Sarmiento Goyeneche, Lina Castrillón	Adventure	
Fait vivir	Óscar Ruiz Navia	Manuk Aukan Mejía, Carmen Ruiz Navia, Juan Sebastián Mejía, Anina Mejía	Documentary	Colombian-Canadian co-production.
Los ajenos fútbol club	Juan Camilo Pinzón	Zharick León, Daniel Lugo, Luis Tamayo	Comedy	
Alma de héroe	Orlando Pardo	Jorge Armando Soto, Stephanie Abello, Tuto Patiño	Action	
Monos	Alejandro Landes	Julianne Nicholson, Moisés Arias, Sofia Buenaventura	Drama	
La Surcusal	Mario Rivero	Adriana Ricardo, Waldo Urrego, Jose Daniel Cristancho	Comedy	
Litigante	Franco Lolli	Vladimir Durán, Leticia Gómez, Carolina Sanín	Action	Spanish-Colombian co-production.
La médium del venerable	Celmira Zuluaga Aparicio	María Fernanda Martínez, Salvo Basile, Mile Vergara, Valeria Esteban, Néstor Cobos Ardila, Mariano Fernández, Ted Perkins, Margarita Forero, Diógenes Guerra, Miguél Ángel Zea Zuluaga, Daniel Torres	Drama, Fiction	
El piedra	Rafael Martínez	Manuel Alvarez, Isaac Martínez, Anibal Gonzalez, Mirla Aaron, Hugo Urruchurto, Rafael Zarabia, Orlando Pineda, Kevin Anaya, Rafael del Pino, Gregorio Alvarez, Sabrina Sosa	Drama, Fiction	
Mamá al volante	Harold Trompetero	Juan Esteban Aponte, Gustavo Bernate, Diego Camargo	Comedy	
Que rico país	Alvaro Almeyda	Nicolás Saenz, Nicolás Pinto, Maria Camila Porras	Comedy, Fiction	
Feo pero sabroso	Fernando Ayllón	Iván Marín, Lina Cardona, Carlos Barbosa	Comedy	
Luz	Juan Diego Escobar Alzate	Yuri Vargas, Conrado Osorio, Andrea Esquivel, Sharon Guzman, Johan Alexander Camacho	Western, Horror, Fantasy	Winner of 26 awards at international film festivals and more than 60 selections
¿Cómo te llamas?	Ruth Caudelli	Alejandra Lara, Silvia Varón, Roberto Cano	Drama	
Antes del olvido	Iria Gómez Concheiro	Leonardo Alonso, Julio Michel Bayón, Rodrigo Cabrera	Drama	Mexican-Colombian co-production.
The Endless Love of Salome	Pierangeli Llinas	Pierangeli Llinas, Melvin Cabrera, Angelica Romero	Drama	American-Colombian co-production. Best Colombian Film at 2018 Bogotá Film Festival.
Amalia	Ana Sofía Osorio	Alejandro Aguilar, Catherine French	Drama	
El que se enamora pierde	Fernando Ayllón	Joavany Alvarez, Linda Baldrich, María Cecilia Botero	Comedy	
Caliban	David Bohorquez	Kate Benson, Tigre Haller, Fiona Horsey	Horror, Thriller	
Los días de la ballena	Catalina Arroyave	David Escallón Orrego, Laura Tobón Ochoa	Drama	
Segunda estrella a la derecha	Ruth Caudeli	Lorena Castellanos, Andrés Jiménez, Alejandra Lara	Comedy	
Rio seco	Pedro Hernández	María Cristina Restrepo, Santiago Londoño, Jefferson Quiñones	Drama	
Lola...drones	Giovanny Patiño	Gina Vallejo, Javier Morales, Freddy Alexander David, Jennifer Ríos, Ernesto Franco, Osvaldo Villa, Cesar Monsalve	Drama	
El rey del sapo	Harold de Vasten	Laura Gabrielle, Sebastían Peñaloza, Martin Hortúa, Enrique González, Catalina Iglesias, Viña Machado	Drama	
Holy Expectations	Fernando Allyón	Adriana Bottina, Fernando Ramos, Isabella Sierra, Omar Murillo, Christian López, Nelson Polanía, Carlos Barbosa, Aída Morales, José Manuel Ospina, Joavany Álvarez	Comedy	
Los Fierros	Pablo González	Alejandro Buitrago, Rodrigo Hernández Jerez, Emilia Ceballos, Jairo Camargo, Ana María Sánchez, Andrés Castañeda, Diego Vásquez	Drama, Fiction	
Perseguida	Yesid Leone Moreno	Maria Gaviria, Roberto Escobar, Geraldine ZivicGonzalo Vivanco, Alex Guzman, Antonia Salazar, Sebastián Yepes, Juan Carlos Toro, Orlando Cadavid, Fredy Jimenez, Kristina Lilley	Suspense	
El Coco 3	Juan Camilo Pinzón	Alexandra Restrepo, Carlos Enrique Sánchez, Gustavo Villanueva, Julián Madrid, Pedro González, María Auxilio Vélez, Roberto Lozano, Tahiana Bueno, Frey Quintero, Martha Isabel Bolaños, Jonatan Cabrera	Comedy	
Irma	Carlos Catraño Giraldo	Karen Escobar, Adriana Gonzalías, Yoanis Escobar, Natalia Bentancout, Andrés Vanegas, Douglas Stevens Bonilla	Drama	
Amigo de nadie	Luis Alberto Restrepo	Juan Pablo Urrego, Catalina García, Ricardo Mejía, Patricia Tamayo, Julián Delgado, Erick Rodríguez, Ernesto Benjumea, Germán Jaramillo	Drama	
Disobedience or How to Train Fighting Roosters	Juan Pablo Ortiz	Cristian Góngora, Brayan Muñoz, Katherine Ojeda, Eduardo Ortiz, Sergio Elias Ortiz, Sebastián Rosero, Nicolas Torres, Ana Lucía Tumal, Nicolás Tupaz, Esteban Unigarro	Thriller, Drama	
Me llevarás en ti	Iván Obando	Carlos Fernández, Geraldine Zivic, Mariana Fernández, Marcela Gutiérrez, Sebastian Gómez, Gisella Zivic, Adrián Díaz	Drama	
lluvia	Diego Espinosa	Carolina Galeano, Adriana Mendoza, Vivian Rodrigo, Eddy Acosta, Diosa Valdez, Alison Rodas, Carlos Velásquez, David Trejos, Nataly Cadavid, Mara Gutiérrez, Paula Villazón, Malena Rodríguez	Drama	
La Pachanga	Harold Trompetero	Francisco Bolívar, Carlos Hurtado, Mario Ruiz, Ana María Arango, Martica Restrepo	Comedy	
Al son que me toque bailo	Dago Garcia	Variel Sánchez, Laura Rodríguez, Julio Pachón, Linda Lucía Callejas	Comedy	
Dedicated to My Ex	Jorge Ulloa		Comedy	Ecuadorian-Colombian co-production

== 2020s ==
Title	Director	Cast	Genre	Notes
2020
El baño	Harold Trompetero	Marcela Carvajal, Carlos Hurtado, Aída Morales, Norma Nivia, Biassini Segura, Ana María Arango	Comedy	
Dogwashers	Carlos Moreno	Christian Tappan, Anderson Ballesteros, Jhon Álex Toro, Ulises González, Leonor López, Héctor Mauricio Mejía and Johnnie Castillo	Crime, Black comedy, Comedy-drama	
Forgotten We'll Be	Fernando Trueba	Javier Cámara, Daniela Abad, Juan Pablo Urrego	Drama	Spanish-Colombian co-production. Won Havana Star Prize for Best Film at 21st Havana Film Festival New York.
Jinetes del paraíso	Talía Osorio Cardona	Cholo Valderrama	Documentary	
Noise	Marco Vélez Esquivia	Ana María Aguilera, Cony Camelo, Jimena Durán, Walther Luengas, Estefanía Piñeres Duque, Biassini Segura, Jacques Toukhmanian, Carlos Manuel Vesga	Crime, Thriller	
The Best Families	Javier Fuentes-León		Documentary	
The Crossing	Juliana Peñaranda-Loftus		Black comedy-drama	Peruvian-Colombian co-production
Tundama	Diego Yaya, Edison Yaya	Leonardo Castellanos, Zulma Rincón, Omar Moyano	Animation, Adventure	
2021
Memoria	Apichatpong Weerasethakul	Tilda Swinton, Elkin Díaz, Jeanne Balibar, Juan Pablo Urrego, Daniel Giménez Cacho	Drama, Mystery, Fantasy	Colombian-Thai-French-Qatari co-production. Won Jury Prize at the 74th Cannes Film Festival.
A Place Called Dignity	Matías Rojas Valencia	Salvador Insunza, Hanns Zischler, Amalia Kassai, Noa Westermeyer, Luis Dubó, David Gaete, Alex Gorlich, Alejandro Goic, Giannina Fruttero, Claudia Cabezas, Paulina Urrutia, Vivian Mahler, Philippa Zu Knyphausen, Gerardo Naumann, Ignacio Solari, Christiane Diaz, Victoria De Gregorio	Drama	An international co-production with France, Chile, Argentina and Germany Nominated - Grand Prix - Best Film at the Tallinn Black Nights Film Festival Winner - Best Director at the Huelva Latin American Film Festival
Somos ecos	Julián Díaz Velosa	Sebastián Velásquez, Felipe Villamil, Maria Luisa López, Liliana Calderón, Juan Sebastián Casanova, Felipe Correa, Sharon Guzman, Mario Jurado, Lise Lenne, Howard Martínez, Jhoan Moreno, Mauricio Salas, David Velázquez	War, Drama	An international co-production with the United States and Italy Nominated - Best International Feature at the 20th San Diego International Film Festival Winner - Audience Choice Feature at the 20th San Diego International Film Festival Nominated - Best Cinematography at the Indian World Film Festival Winner - Best Colombian Film, Best International Film & Best Director at the 39th Bogotá Film Festival
Amparo	Simón Mesa Soto	Sandra Melissa Torres, Diego Alejandro Tobón	Drama	
2022
The Kings of the World	Laura Mora Ortega	Carlos Andrés Castañeda, Davison Florez, Brahian Acevedo, Cristian Campaña, Cristian David Duque	Drama, Road Movie	An international co-production with Luxembourg, France, Mexico & Norway Winner - Golden Shell, Feroz Zinemaldia Award & SIGNIS Awards at the 70th San Sebastián International Film Festival Winner - Best Production Design at the 58th Chicago International Film Festival Nominated - Gold Hugo at the 58th Chicago International Film Festival Nominated - Best Original Score, Best Cinematography, Best Editing & Best Sound at the 10th Platino Awards
A Male	Fabián Hernández Alvarado	Felipe Ramírez Espitia, Juanita Carrillo Ortiz, Jhonathan Steven Rodríguez	Drama	An international co-production with Germany, France & the Netherlands Nominated - Caméra d’Or & Queer Palm at the 75th Cannes Film Festival Winner - Special Jury Award, Best Actor for Felipe Ramírez Espitia, Best Cinematography & International Critics Jury Award for Best Film at the 26th Lima Film Festival Nominated - Horizontes Award & Sebastiane Award at the San Sebastian International Film Festival Winner - Arrecife Award at the International Festival of New Latin American Cinema of Havana
The Other Shape	Diego Felipe Guzmán		Animation, Science fiction	Colombian-Brazilian co-production. Won Best Animated Feature Award in the Sitges Film Festival in 2022.
Pepe Cáceres	Sebastián Eslava & Camilo Molano Parra	Sebastián Eslava, Sara Casasnovas, Carmenza Cossio, Valeria Galviz, Luis Fernando Hoyos, Nicolás Coronado, Gerardo Calero, Manuel Navarro, Cristina Warner, Néstor Alfonso Rojas, Aroha Hafez, Abdelali El Aziz, Gonzalo Sagarmínaga, Quique Sanmartín, Laura Garcia, Fernando Campo, Arcenio Valderrama, Rosario Montaña, Tony Chaparro Cabello, Leynyker Valderrama, Cristian Restrepo	Biographical, Drama	Nominated - Best Original Score for Ezra Axelrod, Best Costume Design & Best Makeup at the 11th Macondo Awards
Petit Mal	Ruth Caudeli	Ruth Caudeli, Silvia Varón, Ana María Otálora	Drama	Nominated - Maguey Award at the 37th Guadalajara International Film Festival Nominated - Sebastiane Award at the 70th San Sebastián International Film Festival Nominated - Best Actress for Ana María Otálora & Best Supporting Actress for Silvia Varón at the 11th Macondo Awards
La Provisoria	Melina Fernández da Silva & Nicolás Meta	Andrés Ciavaglia, Ana Pauls, Juan Chapur, Sol Bordigoni, Nicolás Juárez, Albertina Vázquez	Comedy-drama	An international co-production with Argentina, Chile, Brazil & France
Ultraviolence	Marco Vélez Esquivia	Santiago Cottone, Ana Isabel Castillo, Isabela Cordoba Torres, David Moncada, Marcela Robledo, Raúl Ocampo, Natalia Castañeda, Camila Vallejo Actriz	Psychological thriller	Winner - Best Colombian Fiction Screenplay for Marco Vélez Esquivia at the 19th Pasto International Film Festival Nominated - Best Supporting Actress for Marcela Robledo at the 11th Macondo Awards
The Pack	Andrés Ramírez Pulido	Jhojan Estiven Jimenez, Maicol Andrés Jimenez	Drama	Colombian-French co-production
Tito	Mercedes Arias, Delfina Vidal		Documentary	Panamanian-Colombian co-production
What Lucía Saw	Imanol Uribe	Juana Acosta, Juan Carlos Martínez, Carmelo Gómez, Karra Elejalde	Drama	Spanish-Colombian co-production
2023
I'm Cris from Tierra Bomba	Josephine Landertinger Forero		Documentary	Nominated - Best Visual Effects for Manuel Barrios at the 11th Macondo Awards
Itzia, Tango & Cacao	Flora Martínez	Flora Martínez, Patricia Ércole, Hermes Camelo, Julián Díaz, Carmiña Martínez, Jose Acosta Soto, Ana Wills and Julio Pachón, Gerardo Romano	Drama	
Línea de tiempo	Yesid Leone	María Fernanda Yepes, Osvaldo León, Roberto Escobar, Alexander Guzmán, Carlos Congote, Ana Soler, Kevin Medina, Jesús Orlando Cadavid, Adrián Díaz	Action, Thriller	Nominated - Best Actress for María Fernanda Yepes & Best Original Score at the 11th Macondo Awards
Nubes grises soplan sobre el campo verde	Carlos R. Lopez Parra	Germán Betancourt, Jonatan Camero, Eddy Rivera, Irene Arias, Manuel Antonio Gómez	Drama	Winner - Best Supporting Actor for Manuel Antonio Gómez & Best Cinematography for Camilo Gil at the 10th Calzada de Calatrava International Film Festival
The Other Son	Juan Sebastián Quebrada	Miguel Gonzalez, Ilona Almansa, Jenny Navarrete, John Hurtafo, Gabriel Taboada, Simón Trujillo	Drama	Nominated - Kutxabank Award at the 71st San Sebastián International Film Festival Winner - Best Independent Film & Best Actor - Special Mention for Miguel Gonzalez at the 18th Rome Film Festival Nominated - Best Latin American Film at the 38th Mar del Plata International Film Festival
2024
El Método	Alex Rodríguez	Jessica Sanjuan, Tiberio Cruz, Sergio Palau	Drama	
Malta	Natalia Santa	Estefanía Piñeres, Patricia Tamayo, Emmanuel Restrepo	Drama	
La piel en primavera	Yennifer Uribe Alzate	Laura Zapata, Alba Liliana Agudelo Posada, Luis Eduardo Arango Correa	Drama	
Beloved Tropic	Ana Endara	Paulina García, Jenny Navarrette, Juliette Roy, Syddia Ospina	Drama	
Asalto al mayor	Juan Carlos Mazo	Aura Cristina Geithner, Jairo Camargo, Jorge Cao	Comedy	
Golán	Orlando Culzat	Jacobo Vera, Marcela Agudelo, Jaime Andrés Castaño	Drama	
Yo vi tres luces negras	Santiago Lozano Álvarez	John Alex Castillo, Carol Hurtado, Jesús María Mina	Drama	
Inventario	Mauricio Cataño Panesso	Claudio Cataño, Aroha Hafez, Luis Fernando Bohórquez	Thriller	
El bolero de Rubén	Juan Carlos Mazo	Majida Issa, Diego Cadavid, Marlon Moreno	Drama	
Los de la culpa	Fernando Ayllón, Ángel Ayllón	Ricardo Quevedo, Lina Cardona, Gustavo Bernate	Comedy	
40 días perdidos en la selva	Gustavo Nieto Roa	Margarita Doctor, Marisol Castro, Michel Castro	Thriller	
Mi bestia	Camila Beltrán	Stella Martínez, Héctor Sánchez, Marcela Mar	Drama	
Esposas	Juan Rocha	Beatriz Carvajal Salazar, Sirley Martínez Santos, Nelly Vargas Moncada	Drama	
Quiero que me mantengan	Harold Trompetero	Jackes Toukmanian, Judith Segura, Ana María Arango	Comedy	
Milagro de fe	Ángel Ayllón	Daniela Trujillo, Andres Toro, Jesús Forero	Drama	
Sara: La fuerza del mar	Martín Agudelo Ramírez, Andrés Ricaurte	Sebastián Gómez, Andrés Restrepo, Verónica Lopera	Drama	
The Southern House	Carina Oroza Daroca, Ramiro Fierro	Grisel Quiroga, Piti Campos, Arwen Delaine, Alejandra Lanza, Cristian Mercado, David Mondacca	Drama	Premiered on November 21
Soy de aquí	Janer Mena	Ana Victoria Beltrán, María Irene Toro, Alexander Alzate	Comedy	
Juanpis González: El presidente de la gente	Felipe Cano	Alejandro Riaño, Carolina Gaitán, Julián Caicedo	Comedy	
Pimpinero: Blood and Oil	Andrés Baiz	Juanes, Alejandro Speitzer, Alberto Guerra	Crime	
Sábado oscuro	Marco Vélez Esquivia	Ana Isabel Castillo, David Moncada	Drama	
Colibrí	David Salazar, Francisco Salazar	Simon Elias, Nathalie Rangel, Ana Isabel Castillo	Drama	
Rosario	Felipe Vargas	Emeraude Toubia, David Dastmalchian, José Zúñiga	Horror	
Esto se calentó	Carlos Vergara	Laura Rodríguez, Julián Díaz, Luz Mary Baquero	Comedy	
Una amante de infarto	Ángel Ayllón	Jose Omar Murillo, Iván Marín, Nelsón Polanía	Comedy	
Los iniciados: El diario de las sombras	Carlos Moreno	Andrés Parra, Aria Jara, Jorge Cao	Thriller	
Horizonte	César Augusto Acevedo	Paulina García, Claudio Cataño, Carlos Mario Echeverry	Drama	
2025
The Anatomy of the Horses	Daniel Vidal Toche	Juan Quispe, Edith Ramos, Memé Nuñez, Felipe García, Adrián García, Gladis Conde	Drama, Magical realism	Nominated - PROXIMA Grand Prix at the 59th Karlovy Vary International Film Festival Nominated - Golden Giraldillo at the 22nd Seville European Film Festival Winner - Best Cinematography & Best Production Design at the 22nd Seville European Film Festival Nominated - Best Film at the 43rd Torino Film Festival Winner - FIPRESCI Award at the 43rd Torino Film Festival Nominated - Trophy Spondylus at the 30th Lima Film Festival An international co-production with Spain, Peru and France
Astronauta	Paul Vega	Daniel Hendler, Angie Cepeda, Salvador del Solar, Gustavo Bueno, Marco Zunino, Fiorella Luna, Miguel Iza, Emilram Cossio, Claudia Berninzon, Bernardo Scarpella	Drama	Premiered on February 20, as the closing film of the 27th Punta del Este International Film Festival. An international co-production with Peru and Uruguay.
Llueve sobre Babel	Gala del Sol	Saray Rebolledo, Felipe Aguilar Rodríguez, John Alex Castillo	Comedy	
A Poet	Simón Mesa Soto	Ubeimar Rios, Rebeca Andrade, Guillermo Cardona	Tragicomedy	Winner of the Jury Prize at 2025 Cannes Film Festival.
2026
Susana y Elvira: Sin plan B	Maria Gamboa	Manuela González, Mabel Moreno, Claudio Cataño		
¡Basta mamá!	Flora Martínez	Flora Martínez, Marcela Benjumea, Rafael Zea		
Piedras preciosas	Simón Vélez	Juan Lugo, Laura Taurines, Sofía Jaramillo		
Mu-Ki-Ra	Estefanía Piñeres	Carlos Jean, Ricardo Scioville, Carmenza Gómez		
El hogar fue sepultado en esa tierra que nunca pudimos encontrar	Deimer Quintero Vertel	Juan Esteban López, Víctor Negrete Barrera, Margarita Vertel Anaya		
Meteorito	Sebastián Múnera	Ángela Cano, Jaime Castaño, Luna Gaviria		
Ojo por ojo	Eduardo Ayllón	Joavany Alvarez, Lina Castrillón, Andrés Felipe Carvajal		
Clave de amor	Luis Fernando Bernal Polo	Sebastián Soto Londoño, Isabela Herrera Díaz, Hugo Manuel Barrero		
Las almas ni los ojos	Canela Reyes, César Alejandro Jaimes	José Oliverio Ospina, Jaime González, Luz Mary Rendón		
Cinco años, cuatro meses	Esteban Hoyos García, Juan Miguel Gelacio	Carmiña Martínez, Jenny Nava		
Pacífico	Gonzalo Gutiérrez	Manolo Cardona, Ricardo Abarca, María Gabriela de Faría	Sci-fi	

== See also ==
- List of Colombian documentary films
- List of films depicting Colombia
- World cinema
