= Allá en el trapiche =

1943 film

Allá en el trapiche is a 1943 Colombian comedy by the Chilean director Roberto Saa Silva from a script by Gabriel Martinez, and starring Colombian actors such as Lily Alvarez, Tocayo Ceballos, Soledad Sierra and Humberto Onetto. An early example of a domestic sound film at a time when such productions were rare in Colombia, Allá en el trapiche was a conscious attempt to recreate the success of the megahit Mexican film Allá en el rancho grande, which itself belonged to the widely popular Mexican genre called "ranchera comedy" (comedia ranchera mexicana).
