= Silence in Paradise =

2011 film

- Directed by: Colbert Garcia
- Written by: Colbert Garcia; Mauricio Cuervo
- Starring: Linda Baldrich
- Release dates: April 2011 (Chicago LFF); 25 November 2011 (Colombia)
- Running time: 92 minutes
- Country: Colombia
- Language: Spanish

Silence in Paradise (Spanish: Silencio en el Paraiso) is a 2011 Colombian drama film directed and co-written by Colbert Garcia.

== Cast ==
- Linda Baldrich as Lady
- Francisco Bolívar as Ronald
