= Fortuna Lake =

2019 film

- Directed by: Felipe Martínez Amador
- Written by: Felipe Martínez Amador; Jorge de Dios; Elena Sainz
- Produced by: Felipe Martínez Amador; Javier Delgado; Estefanía Piñeres
- Starring: Estefanía Piñeres; José Restrepo; Daniela Martínez; Carolina Cuervo
- Music by: Jairo Vargas
- Production companies: Proyectil; Boonet; Surdico Films; Letrario
- Release date: February 21, 2019
- Running time: 91 minutes
- Country: Colombia
- Language: Spanish

Fortuna Lake is a 2019 Colombian film directed and co-written by Felipe Martínez Amador.

== Plot ==
Malorie escapes from a psychiatric hospital. She doesn't remember why she ended up in that place. Malorie arrives in Fortuna Lake, where she meets Jared, a mysterious neighbor. Together with him, she will try to recover some of the clarity she has lost in recent weeks, to escape those who are stalking her, to understand the dark hallucinations that torment her and to discover the relationship they have with Susan's disappearance.

== Cast ==
- Estefanía Piñeres - Malorie McCoy
- José Restrepo - Jared Fink
- Daniela Martínez - Danny Dodge
- Carolina Cuervo - The nurse
