= All Your Dead Ones =

2011 film

- Film poster
- Directed by: Carlos Moreno
- Written by: Carlos Moreno; Alonso Torres
- Produced by: Nancy Fernández
- Starring: John Alex Castillo
- Release dates: January 2011 (Sundance); 15 July 2011 (Colombia)
- Running time: 88 minutes
- Country: Colombia
- Language: Spanish

All Your Dead Ones (Spanish: Todos tus muertos) is a 2011 Colombian drama film directed by Carlos Moreno, who also co-wrote the screenplay. The film won an award for cinematography at the 2011 Sundance Film Festival.

== Cast ==
- John Alex Castillo
- Harold Devasten
- Jorge Herrera
- Martha Marquez
- Alvaro Rodríguez as Salvador
