= See You After School (1986 film) =

A la salida nos vemos
- Theatrical release poster
- Directed by: Carlos Palau
- Screenplay by: Carlos Palau; Sandro Romero
- Produced by: María Teresa Bonilla
- Starring: Alejandro Madriñan; Abril Mendez; Santiago Madriñan; John Klonis
- Cinematography: José Madeiros
- Edited by: Armando Valero
- Music by: Alejandro Blanco Uribe; José González
- Production companies: Focine; Producciones Solsticio; Hangar Films; Compañía de Fomento
- Distributed by: Focine
- Release date: 19 June 1986
- Running time: 105 minutes
- Country: Colombia
- Box office: 18,000 Admissions (Colombia)

A la salida nos vemos (English: See You After School) is a 1986 Colombian drama film directed and co-written by Carlos Palau. The film is a teen drama set in a Catholic boarding school in rural Valle del Cauca in the 1960s.

== Plot ==
A group of teenagers at a Catholic boarding school in the provinces spend their time trying to adapt to the demands of the priest in charge of the school while discovering life with their adventures and pains. It presents the romantic and sexual initiation of the group of adolescent boys and their problems.

== Cast ==
- Alejandro Madriñan as Miguel
- Abril Mendez as Angela
- Santiago Madriñan
- John Klonis
- Irene Arcila
- Alvaro Ruiz as Miguel's father

== Awards ==
A la salida nos vemos premiered on 19 June 1986 at the 26° Cartagena Film Festival where it won the India Catalina award as Best Film by a New Director. The film had its wide released on 18 November 1987.
