= Me llevarás en ti =

2019 Colombian film

- Directed by: Iván Obando
- Written by: Iván Obando
- Starring: Carlos Fernández; Geraldine Zivic; Mariana Fernández
- Release date: 24 October 2019 (Colombia)
- Countries: Colombia; Spain; Italy
- Language: Spanish

Me llevarás en ti is a Spanish-language historical drama film created and directed by Iván Obando based on the book of the same name by Editorial Planeta. The film stars Carlos Fernández, Geraldine Zivic, and Mariana Fernández. The film was screened on 7 September 2019 in Bucaramanga, Colombia at the 2019 Santander International Film Festival, and is scheduled to premiere on 24 October 2019 in national cinemas.

== Cast ==
- Carlos Fernández as Gonzalo Mejía
- Géraldine Zivic as Isolda Prunzisky
  - Mariana Fernández as Young Isolda Prunzisky
- Marcela Gutiérrez as Alicia Arango
- Gisella Zivic as Olga Landowska
- Sebastián Gómez as Wenzeslaus
- Adrian Díaz as Lato
- Gonzalo Vivanco as Captain Secundino
- Aldemar Correa as Eduardo Mejía
- María Gaviria as Marichu Mejía
- Sebastián Yatra as Himserfl
