= Ayer me echaron del pueblo =

1982 film

- Theatrical release poster
- Directed by: Jorge Gaitán Gómez
- Screenplay by: Jorge Gaitán Gómez; Alfonso Acevedo
- Produced by: Alfonso Acevedo
- Starring: Camilo Medina; Stella Suárez; Francisco Amaya; Carlos Barbosa
- Cinematography: Hermino Barrera; Carlos Pulido
- Edited by: Jorge Gaitán Gómez
- Music by: Jose A. Morales
- Production company: Acevar Division Cinematográfica
- Release date: April 1982
- Running time: 106 minutes
- Country: Colombia
- Language: Spanish

Ayer me echaron del pueblo is a 1982 Colombian drama film directed by Jorge Gaitán Gómez, who also co-wrote the screenplay. The film was inspired by the eponymous song written by Jose A. Morales. The plot follows the bitter life of a family of peasants forced to move to the city.

== Plot ==
Inspired by the lyrics of a popular nostalgic song, the film tells the story a family that is forced to leave their rural environment and escape to the big city due to pressure from a powerful landowner who deprives them of their meager properties. Overcome by the difficulties in their new hostile urban environment, the family of peasants descends into a tragic circle of poverty. Trying to survive the man falls from underemployment to delinquency; the wife from working as a housekeeper to prostitution and their children end up in the stormy life of street children.

== Cast ==
- Camilo Medina
- Stella Suárez
- Francisco Amaya
- Carlos Barbosa
- Hector Rivas
- Jose Saldarriaga
- Edgardo Roman
- Hugo Patiño
