= Poppy Garden =

- Poster
- Spanish: Jardín de Amapolas
- Directed by: Juan Carlos Melo Guevera
- Written by: Juan Carlos Melo Guevera, Angelica Morales Mora
- Produced by: Alexandra Yepes, Maja Zimmerman
- Cinematography: Ivan Quinones
- Distributed by: Chirimoya Films
- Release date: 2014
- Running time: 88 minutes
- Country: Colombia
- Language: Spanish

Poppy Garden (Spanish: Jardín de Amapolas) is a Colombian drama film produced from 2007 to 2012 and finally released in theaters in 2014. It was written and directed by Juan Carlos Melo Guevara. It tells the story of a father and his nine-year-old son living in Nariño Department during the Colombian conflict and trying to survive amid violence on all sides from guerillas, paramilitary forces, and narco-traffickers.

== Plot ==
Emilio is a 38-year-old farmer who lives on a small plot of land in the Colombian highlands with his nine-year-old son Simón. However, a paramilitary group takes over the area and forces Emilio off his land. Emilio and his son relocate to the home of a cousin, Wilson, in a small town in the Nariño Department. Emilio goes to work with Wilson in an illicit poppy field and heroin laboratory belonging to Ramiro, a notorious drug trafficker.

Simón becomes friends with Luisa, a pretty and outgoing girl. They share adventures with a schnauser puppy that belongs to a neighbor. Their adventures include secretly riding in the back of a truck, visiting a pristine green mountain lake, and exploring in the mountains where sections have been planted with mines by the drug traffickers.

Simón is discovered on the poppy farm and taken to the boss, Ramiro. Ramiro learns that Simón's mother and his siblings have been killed and that he and his father have been forced from the land by paramilitaries. Ramiro befriends Simón and teaches him to shoot a gun.

During one scene, rebels attack the town, and Emilio shields Simón. Simón watches as the rebels' bullets make holes in the walls of their home. In a later scene, a paramilitary unit occupies the town, holding the people at gunpoint to find any residents who are collaborating with the guerillas. Several of the residents suspected of being with the guerillas are shot by the paramilitaries and their bodies left in the town square. Luisa is one of the villagers killed by the paramilitaries. The residents then fear a retaliatory attack by the guerillas.

Wilson asks Simón to steal drugs from the boss to allow them to have a better life. Simón complies and takes a small packet of drugs. Ramiro learns of the theft and shoots Simón in the arm. As Ramiro aims his gun to shoot again, the drug laboratory explodes in flames. Emilio and Simón escape amid the confusion of the fire.

== Production and themes ==
The film was directed by Juan Carlos Melo Guevera. It was written by Melo and Angelica Morales Mora. Ivan Quinones was the cinematographer. Melo described his goal in making the film: "Here the monster is war and the weakest beings are children. And for me it was very important that people become sensitive to the victims."

For his cast, Melo selected locals from Nariño who had not previously acted in a film. Eighty percent of the technical staff had also never made a film. Melo later said that his greatest asset in making the film was the natural beauty of Nariño. He also recalled that one of the challenges was his inability to find a poppy farm where he was allowed to film. He overcame the obstacle by planting a small field for use in filming. He then had footage of the small field duplicated digitally to create the appearance of a large poppy farm.

It took eight years for the film to reach the screen. Melo wrote the script in 2007 and began his search for financing. The film was presented at a film festival in Cartagena in 2012, but it did not have its official premiere until the Pasto International Film Festival on August 20, 2014.

== Cast ==
- Luis Burgos as Simón
- Carlos Hualpa as Emilio
- Juan Carlos Rosero as Wilson Ocampo
- Luis Lozano as Ramiro
- Paula Páez as Luisa

== Reception ==
El Pais called the film's widespread release in December 2014 "a reason for joy". Oswaldo Osorio of El Colombiano called it "a precise and compelling story" that presents Colombia's struggles from a "cleaner and more decontaminated" perspective and a "fresh, endearing and revealing" point of view. Osorio added:

What is most striking about this film is the tone it manages to tell its story and develop its characters. Simplicity as a virtue and naturalness as an element that grants credibility are the bases of a story that brings the viewer closer to the intimacy and vision of the world of these characters, a vision that, despite the threatening context, maintains a certain innocence and calm.

Senal Colombia praised the film's use of natural actors as adding "a dose of reality". Senal Colombia also opined that the film provided "a cinematographic portrait of rural life in Nariño, one of the departments hardest hit by corruption, drug trafficking and violence resulting from said illegal activity in rural areas."

In 2016, film critic Jeronimo Rivera-Betancur of El Tiempo rated the film at No. 22 on his list of favorite Colombian fiction films.
