= Disobedience or How to Train Fighting Roosters =

- Theatrical release poster
- Directed by: Juan Pablo Ortiz
- Written by: Juan Pablo Ortiz
- Produced by: Paola Andrea Suesca
- Starring: Cristian Góngora; Ana Tumal; Brayan Muñoz
- Cinematography: Juan David Andrade; Mario Villota
- Edited by: Juam Pablo Linares
- Music by: Mulato; Suck
- Production company: Mamá Sur
- Release date: October 31, 2019 (Colombia)
- Running time: 85 minutes
- Country: Colombia
- Language: Spanish

Disobedience or How to Train Fighting Roosters (Spanish: Desobediencia o cómo entrenar gallos de pelea) is a 2019 Colombian thriller drama film written and directed by Juan Pablo Ortiz in his directorial debut. Starring Cristian Góngora, Ana Tumal and Brayan 'Mulato' Muñoz. It is inspired by the essay "Civil Disobedience" by Henry David Thoreau.

== Synopsis ==
An anarchist group in the 90s called “How to Train Fighting Roosters”, tired of the evil that consumes humanity and inspired by Henry David Thoreau's essay "Civil Disobedience", decided to document on video the actions they take to achieve spiritual change. But their actions will have moral difficulties that will lead them to make drastic decisions.

== Cast ==
The actors participating in this film are:

- Cristian Góngora
- Ana Tumal as Lady Commander
- Brayan 'Mulato' Muñoz as Brother
- Eduardo Ortiz as Army Major
- Sergio Elias Ortiz as Second Commander
- Esteban Unigarro as Augusto Garavito

== Production ==
Principal photography lasted 11 days in Pasto Nariño, Colombia.

== Release ==
Disobedience or How to Train Fighting Roosters was commercially released on October 31, 2019, in Colombian theaters.
