= Colombian Postcards =

2011 film

- Theatrical release poster
- Directed by: Ricardo Coral
- Produced by: Linithd Aparicio
- Release date: April 2011 (Chicago LFF)
- Running time: 94 minutes
- Country: Colombia
- Language: Spanish

Colombian Postcards (Spanish: Postales Colombianas) is a 2011 Colombian comedy film directed by Ricardo Coral. The Spanish-language film stars Adriana Campos, Alexandra Escobar and Sandra Guzmán.
