= Nubes grises soplan sobre el campo verde =

- Theatrical release poster
- Directed by: Carlos R. Lopez Parra
- Written by: Carlos R. Lopez Parra
- Produced by: Angelica Morales Mora; Alexandra Yepes
- Starring: Germán Betancourt; Jonathan Camero
- Cinematography: Camilo Gil
- Edited by: Gabriel Baudet
- Music by: Iván Meluk
- Production company: Chirimoya Films
- Distributed by: Filmax
- Release dates: August 15, 2023 (Calatrava); September 7, 2023 (Colombia)
- Running time: 111 minutes
- Country: Colombia
- Language: Spanish

Nubes grises soplan sobre el campo verde (lit. 'Gray clouds blow over the green field') is a 2023 Colombian drama film written and directed by Carlos R. Lopez Parra in his directorial debut. It is about a father looking for a caregiver to care for his son with cerebral palsy after his eventual death from terminal cancer. It stars Germán Betancourt and Jonathan Camero.

== Synopsis ==
Manuel, an old man with terminal cancer, fears leaving behind his son Simón, a young man with a profound cognitive disability, after his death. The old man exhausts the possibilities he has to find someone to take care of the boy, but it is the unexpected arrival of a fugitive, Roberto, who seems to give him a hope very different from the one he had considered.

== Cast ==
The actors participating in this film are:

- Germán Betancourt as Manuel
- Jonatan Camero as Simón
- Eddy Rivera as Roberto
- Irene Arias as Socorro
- Manuel Antonio Gómez as Álvaro

== Release ==
Nubes grises soplan sobre el campo verde premiered worldwide on August 15, 2023, at the 10th Calzada de Calatrava International Film Festival, and was later released commercially on September 7 of the same year in Colombian theaters.

== Accolades ==
Year	Award / Festival	Category	Recipient	Result	Ref.
2023	Calzada de Calatrava International Film Festival	Best Supporting Actor	Manuel Antonio Gómez	Won	
2023	Calzada de Calatrava International Film Festival	Best Cinematography	Camilo Gil	Won	
