= Chronicle of the End of the World =

Chronicle of the End of the World, aka Crónica del fin del mundo
- Movie poster for Crónica del fin del mundo
- Directed by: Mauricio Cuervo
- Written by: Mauricio Cuervo
- Starring: Víctor Hugo Morant, Jimmy Vásquez, Claudia Aguirre
- Cinematography: Pedro Pablo Vega
- Music by: Orlando Betancourt Escobar
- Release date: 2013
- Running time: 90 minutes
- Country: Colombia
- Language: Spanish

Chronicle of the End of the World (Spanish: Crónica del fin del mundo) is a 2013 Colombian black comedy film written and directed by Mauricio Cuervo.

== Plot ==
The film is set in Colombia as the end of the world approaches. A retired university professor, Pablo, has lived isolated in his apartment for two decades, since his wife was killed by a bomb in Bogotá. He decides to seek revenge on those who have wronged and marginalized him. His son, Felipe, has a newborn baby but no job. Felipe's wife, Claudia, worries about her son's future. In his pursuit of revenge, Pablo meets a dangerous man. The film shows what the end of the world would look like from a perspective.

== Production ==
This was the first film directed by Mauricio Cuervo. Pedro Pablo Vega was the director of photography.

== Cast ==
- Victor Hugo Morant, as Pablo
- Jimmy Vásquez, as Felipe
- Claudia Aguirre, as Claudia

== Reception ==
The film won the awards as the best Colombian movie at the XXIX Film Festival of Bogota. Oswaldo Osario in El Colombiano called it "an intimate and reflective drama, not only about the human condition, but also about the country in which we live." He also praised its ability "to say important things intelligently" and its "subtle and suggestive way, being very eloquent without having to show the obvious."

In 2016, film critic Jeronimo Rivera-Betancur of El Tiempo rated the film at No. 25 on his list of favorite Colombian fiction films.
