= List of Colombian submissions for the Academy Award for Best International Feature Film =

Best International Feature Film submissions from Colombia

Highlights
- Debut: 1980
- Submissions: 35
- Nominations: 1
- Oscar winners: none

Colombia has submitted films for the Academy Award for Best International Feature Film (Note: The category was previously named the Academy Award for Best Foreign Language Film, but this was changed to the Academy Award for Best International Feature Film in April 2019, after the Academy deemed the word "Foreign" to be outdated.) since 1980. The award is handed out annually by the United States Academy of Motion Picture Arts and Sciences to a feature-length motion picture produced outside the United States that contains primarily non-English dialogue. The Colombian submission is decided annually by the Consejo Nacional de Cinematografía, a branch of the Colombian Ministry of Culture.

As of 2026, Colombia has been nominated once, for Embrace of the Serpent (2015).

== Submissions ==
The Academy of Motion Picture Arts and Sciences has invited the film industries of various countries to submit their best film for the Academy Award for Best International Feature Film since 1956. The International Feature Film Committee oversees the process and reviews all the submitted films. Following this, they vote via secret ballot to determine the five nominees for the award.

In 2004, Colombia announced that it had selected Maria Full of Grace, and the film was touted as an early front-runner to win the award. However, the film was disqualified by AMPAS, which argued that the film did not qualify as a majority Colombian production because it was written and directed by an American filmmaker Joshua Marston. After an unsuccessful appeal, Colombia was allowed to send El Rey as a replacement. Although it was disqualified, however, Catalina Sandino Moreno was eventually nominated for the Academy Award for Best Actress and holds the title as the only Colombian nominated to an acting category.

Ciro Guerra is currently the filmmaker with most submissions, with four films selected. Followed by filmmakers Sergio Cabrera, Carlos Moreno and Jorge Alí Triana, which each had their films selected two times. Iranian filmmaker Barbet Schroeder was the first non-Colombian filmmaker selected to represent the country, for Our Lady of the Assassins (2001); twenty years later, Thai filmmaker Apichatpong Weerasethakul was also selected to represent the country, for Memoria (2021); both films were set in Colombia.

Guerra also directed the country only nominated film, Embrace of the Serpent (2015). Birds of Passage (2018) advanced to the December shortlists, but it was not nominated.

Most of the Colombian submissions were filmed primarily in Spanish, with the exception of Embrace of the Serpent (2015) and Birds of Passage (2018), both mainly filmed in South American native languages. Below is a list of the films that have been submitted by Colombia for review by the Academy for the award by year and the respective Academy Awards ceremony.

Year (Ceremony)	English title	Original title	Language(s)	Director	Result
1980 (53rd)	The Latin Immigrant	El inmigrante latino	Spanish	Gustavo Nieto Roa	Not nominated
1984 (57th)	A Man of Principle	Cóndores no entierran todos los días	Spanish	Francisco Norden	Not nominated
1986 (59th)	A Time to Die	Tiempo de morir	Spanish	Jorge Alí Triana	Not nominated
1991 (64th)	Confessing to Laura	Confesión a Laura	Spanish	Jaime Osorio Gómez	Not nominated
1994 (67th)	The Strategy of the Snail	La estrategia del caracol	Spanish	Sergio Cabrera	Not nominated
1996 (69th)	Oedipus Mayor	Edipo Alcalde	Spanish	Jorge Alí Triana	Not nominated
1997 (70th)	The Debt	La deuda	Spanish	Manuel José Álvarez and Nicolás Buenaventura	Not nominated
1998 (71st)	The Rose Seller	La vendedora de rosas	Spanish	Víctor Gaviria	Not nominated
1999 (72nd)	Time Out	Golpe de estadio	Spanish	Sergio Cabrera	Not nominated
2001 (74th)	Our Lady of the Assassins	La virgen de los sicarios	Spanish	Barbet Schroeder	Not nominated
2002 (75th)	The Invisible Children	Los niños invisibles	Spanish	Lisandro Duque Naranjo	Not nominated
2003 (76th)	La Primera Noche		Spanish	Luis Alberto Restrepo	Not nominated
2004 (77th)	El Rey		Spanish	Antonio Dorado	Not nominated
2005 (78th)	Wandering Shadows	La sombra del caminante	Spanish	Ciro Guerra	Not nominated
2006 (79th)	A Ton of Luck	Soñar no cuesta nada	Spanish	Rodrigo Triana	Not nominated
2007 (80th)	Satanás		Spanish	Andrés Baiz	Not nominated
2008 (81st)	Dog Eat Dog	Perro come perro	Spanish	Carlos Moreno	Not nominated
2009 (82nd)	The Wind Journeys	Los viajes del viento	Spanish, Palenquero, Wayuunaiki, Ikun	Ciro Guerra	Not nominated
2010 (83rd)	Crab Trap	El vuelco del cangrejo	Spanish	Oscar Ruiz Navia	Not nominated
2011 (84th)	The Colors of the Mountain	Los colores de la montaña	Spanish	Carlos César Arbeláez	Not nominated
2012 (85th)	The Snitch Cartel	El Cartel de los Sapos	Spanish	Carlos Moreno	Not nominated
2013 (86th)	La Playa DC		Spanish	Juan Andrés Arango	Not nominated
2014 (87th)	Mateo		Spanish	María Gamboa	Not nominated
2015 (88th)	Embrace of the Serpent	El abrazo de la serpiente	Cubeo, Ocaina, German, Huitoto, Bora, Andoque, Yucuna, Muinane, Spanish, Ticuna, Wanano, Catalan, Portuguese, Latin, English	Ciro Guerra	Nominated
2016 (89th)	Alias Maria		Spanish	José Luis Rugeles Gracia	Not nominated
2017 (90th)	Guilty Men	Pariente	Spanish	Iván Gaona	Not nominated
2018 (91st)	Birds of Passage	Pájaros de verano	Wayuu, Spanish, English, Wiwa	Cristina Gallego and Ciro Guerra	Made shortlist
2019 (92nd)	Monos		Spanish, English	Alejandro Landes	Not nominated
2020 (93rd)	Forgotten We'll Be	El olvido que seremos	Spanish	Fernando Trueba	Not nominated
2021 (94th)	Memoria		Spanish, English	Apichatpong Weerasethakul	Not nominated
2022 (95th)	The Kings of the World	Los reyes del mundo	Spanish	Laura Mora Ortega	Not nominated
2023 (96th)	Un Varón		Spanish	Fabián Hernández Alvarado	Not nominated
2024 (97th)	La Suprema		Spanish	Felipe Holguin	Not nominated
2025 (98th)	A Poet	Un poeta	Spanish	Simón Mesa Soto	Not nominated
2026 (99th)	Rains Over Babel	Llueve sobre Babel	Spanish	Gala del Sol	Pending

== Shortlisted films ==
Since 2014, Colombia has announced a list of finalists or eligible films that varied in number over the years (from 3 to 16 films) before announcing their official Oscar nominee, except in the year 2022 where an official list was not announced. The following films have been shortlisted by the Colombian Academy of Cinematography Arts and Sciences:

Year	Film
2014	Dust on the Tongue · Los hongos
2015	Ella · Gente de bien · Land and Shade
2016	Anna · Dark Beast · The Seed of Silence
2017	The Animal's Wife · The Dragon Defense · X500
2018	Killing Jesus · Virus Tropical · We Are the Heat
2019	Days of the Whale · Litigante · El Piedra
2020	Accidental Blessing · After Norma · Disobedience or How to Train Fighting Roosters · La fortaleza · Jaguar: voz de un territorio · Jinetes del Paraíso · Luz
2021	Ángel de mi vida · Noise · Suspensión · Valley of Souls
2023	Alis · Anhell69 · The Border · I'm Cris from Tierra Bomba · Itzia, Tango & Cacao · Línea de tiempo · Nubes grises soplan sobre el campo verde · The Other Shape · The Other Son · Pepe Cáceres · Petit Mal · Simona Amaya, vivir o morir por la libertad · Somos ecos · Ultraviolence
2025	Adiós al amigo · Between Sea and Land · Choibá: The Dance of the Humpback Whale · En lo profundo · Estimados señores · Irredentos · Matrioshka · Mi bestia · Seed of the Desert · Soul of the Desert · Uno: entre el oro y la muerte

== See also ==
- List of Academy Award winners and nominees for Best International Feature Film
- List of Academy Award-winning foreign language films
- Cinema of Colombia
- List of Colombian films
