= The Art of Losing (film) =

2004 film

- Promotional poster
- Spanish: Perder es cuestión de método
- Directed by: Sergio Cabrera
- Screenplay by: Jorge Goldenberg
- Based on: Perder es cuestión de método by Santiago Gamboa
- Produced by: Gerardo Herrero; Marianella Cabrera
- Starring: Daniel Giménez Cacho; Martina García; César Mora; Víctor Mallarino
- Cinematography: Hans Burmann
- Edited by: Carmen Frías
- Music by: Xavier Capellas
- Production companies: Tornasol Films; Latinia PC
- Release dates: 3 September 2004 (Venice); 1 April 2005 (Colombia); 3 June 2005 (Spain)
- Running time: 107 min.
- Countries: Spain; Colombia
- Language: Spanish

The Art of Losing (Spanish: Perder es cuestión de método) is a 2004 Spanish-Colombian thriller film directed by Sergio Cabrera from a screenplay by Jorge Goldenberg based on the novel by Santiago Gamboa. It stars Daniel Giménez Cacho, César Mora, Martina García, and Víctor Mallarino.

A grim history, but also human and fun, led by Colombian Sergio Cabrera (Golpe de estadio, La Estrategia del Caracol), the movie exposes the corruption rampant in the South American country - and the unholy nexus between politicians, land developers, the mafia and the military police. The film is a Tornasol Films and Latinia PC production.

Based on the novel "Method of Losing" by Santiago Gamboa ( the quote is from Juan Sepulveda : "Defeat is often a Question of Method," which in the movie is put into the mouth of the ageing and psychotic mentor of the journalist, Guzman ).

The novel was adapted by screenwriter Jorge Goldenberg (Ilona Arrives with the Rain), we are shown a Colombia from a very particular angle: through the daily struggle between the romantic and the nihilistic . Daniel Jiménez Cacho (La Mala Educación) plays the journalist Victor Silampa and Martina Garcia (Golpe de Estadio) plays the 16-year-old prostitute Quica, while Cesar Mora, in a role worthy of an Oscar-nomination, plays Sancho Panza to the journalist's Don Quixote, as Estupinan - probably the most human and sympathetic of all the characters - representing the Colombian "Everyman".

== Plot ==
A fisherman (Jorge Ali Triana) and his dog are out for a walk when they discover an impaled corpse. A journalist named Victor Silampa (Gimenez Cacho) is writing an article about Peter Gay, about bourgeois attitudes about Romantic Love through the 17th to 19th centuries. Silampa receives a call from the Police-Colonel Aristophanes Moya (Benjumea) who calls him to the station immediately notifying him of the crime. Moya suggests an exchange of favors (Silampa had a criminal record), whereby the journalist would actively investigate the case while Moya will provide him with protection if, in addition, the journalist will "ghost-write" for him a speech for a slimming non-conformist Evangelical Christian sect, originating in Memphis, called "The Last Supper".

Silampa arrives at the crime scene - obtaining carte blanche through his dropping of the Colonel's name - where he takes photos of the corpse. Later the body is carried to Legal Medicine (Colombian Forensic Institution). The corpse is unrecognizable and the fingerprints had been burned off - the body bloated and discolored after nearly two months in the temperate jungle in accordance with Piedrahita, the forensic. A short, bald, fat man named Emir Estupiñan (Mora) who is searching for his brother, Osler, a taxi driver who has gone missing - and who claims that "something about the corpse is familiar", i.e. reminiscent of his late brother.

Silampa goes to a Psychiatric Hospital where he meets with a former colleague - also mentor, as Silampa calls him "el Maestro" - known as Guzman, who is schizophrenic, warns him that impalement is a crime used to scare people. Guzmán gives Silampa a mannequin installed by the window of his apartment-for speaking with someone due his loneliness as he has recently been dumped by his girlfriend. One night Silampa goes to a brothel called "Lolita" where Estupiñan has invited him to talk with a truck driver named Lotario Abuchija who had been paid by a beautiful woman to take "a package" from Tunja to an abandoned house in Chocontá. Silampa feels bad due to hemorrhoids and asthma, but when leaving he is accosted by a beautiful young prostitute named Quica. Quica is already busy with a table of drunks and offers him another appointment because she was busy.

The next day Silampa and Estupiñan go where Abuchija, the truck driver had dropped "the package" - and they enter to a small abandoned house near the lake and discover important clues: a construction sign of Vargas Vicuña, a chair with some blood on it, and a sign of Turkish baths "The Earthly Paradise." Estupiñan is involved with the case just to find his brother, who is possibly the impaled corpse was supposedly murdered - and confuses Silampa to work for the "secret police" because of his "education" and "access" to governmental corridors.

A lawyer named Emilio Barragan calls Councilman Marco Tulio Esquilache; apparently both are involved in the crime, as well as being related : Barragan is married to the niece of Esquilache. At the same time, the councilman also calls Vargas Vicuña, a civil engineer - who is very interested in the land near the lake where the body was found impaled.

On the other hand, Vargas Vicuña calls Barragan, the lawyer, about the grounds of the lake and asks him to be his lawyer to help him acquire the land as soon as possible.

Silampa reports his research to Colonel Moya and the Colonel appears more interested in, and emphasizes that the journalist continue writing his speech for "The Last Supper" congregation. Silampas decides to investigate the Turkish baths "The Earthly Paradise." Silampa goes to meet Quica that night at the "Lolita Bar". She takes him up to a room. Silampa is very drunk and cannot have sex with her, although she undresses and he takes a picture of her. He wakes up the next morning in Quica's house because he was so drunk, some people helped put him in a cab to her house. Trying to act tough and older than her years, she claims he owes her money, to which the journalist smilingly agrees - but she reveals her soft-hearted and growing fascination with him. Silampa offers date her - but by day - revealing that he is getting emotionally attracted to the young prostitute. Silampa and Quica both arrive in the Turkish baths "The Earthly Paradise, where there is a sect devoted to naturism. While registering, Silampa notes a portrait of the founder Casiodoro Pereira Antunez - the same man who owned the land now wanted by all since his demise. The naked Silampa goes "detecting" and sneaks out and reads the registration of a suspicious car mentioned by Abuchija and returns inside with Quica and meets the supposed car-owner named Susan Caviedes, who is the Manager of the Baths. Later Quica and Silampa go to the "Lolita" nightclub and suspect about Susan. Silampa invites Quica to his house and they have sex at night together.

Silampa finds in the paper archives a photo of the burial of Pereria Antunez, and asks a colleague who identifies that Vargas Vicuña, Barragan, Esquilache and Tiflis were all in attendance. He asks his colleague to help a bit but the other reporter wants to take Silampa's car; he leaves with the keys only to come back and notifies him that the vehicle has been seriously damaged . Silampa goes to take a look at the vandalised car - windshields knocked in with a turd on the bonnet, with graffiti "We came here, we ate here, and here we shat.". Silampa thinks that both he and Quica were in danger, and asks Quica to not go to work anymore in the bar and escape with him temporarily.

Esquilache y Barragan spend the weekend together at their palatial hacienda, talking business at night. Esquilache asks Barragan about the deed to the land where the body was found. He tells the deed the recently deceased entrepreneur named Cassiodorus Pereira Antunez, who owned the land by the lake, does not appear to be in the files of the city, and no one has claimed inheritance. Esquilache warns that the land would pass to the district if no one claims ownership and between the two they decide to look for the Deed, due to Esquilache's agreement with a construction company that has sponsored him before in his political campaigns. Barragan and Esquiliche go to meet Heliodoro Tiflis, the flamboyant and possibly bi-sexual owner of the "Lolita" bar, requesting him to track down the Deed for the land at the lake, pleading with him that not finding the Deed of this land would be catastrophic, as it would then be expropriated by and for the district.

Tiflis meets and taunts Vargas Vicuña and mocks the engineer by offering several prostitutes. Tifilis becomes aware of Silampa and asks his henchmen to monitor the journalist's home and wait for him to arrive. Silampa has however already moved in with Quica. Estupiñan offers to do him a favor and disguises himself as a plumber, enters the home and picks up Moya's speech and some elements of the investigation. Moya asks Silampa continue investigation and gives a cell phone to connect with Moya.

Is revelad Susan and Tiflis are lovers and Silampa follows her up to Tiflis hotel penthouse. When Tiflis and Susan leaves the hotel, Silampa goes to the top floor residence, finds and steals the Deedand flees the scene accompanied by a taxi driver met on the road. Silampa reviews the Deed that night at the home of Quica. Silampa and Estupiñan go to the Psychiatric Hospital to meet with Guzman, and are told by him that this impaled body was probably Pereira Antunez. They express disbelief as by that time Antunez had already been buried for a month or more. Silampa feels confused, making piss-off Guzmán ultimately having to be calmed down by staff, cutting short the visit. At night, Estupiñan and Silampa go to a bar by the Cemetery, where the lady owner it introduces them to Jaime Bengala, a lepper grave-digger which takes them into the cemetery to see the tomb of Pereira Antunez and with the help of Bengala, open the tomb and the coffin releasing the corpse is Osler, Estupiñan's brother. Estupinan decides to avenge his brother.

The next day Tiflis angrily reproaches Susan and his henchman for the loss of the Deed, and asks his gunman to keep Susan hostage until he finds the document. After of be interrogated by Tiflis' thugs, Councilman Esquilache calls the lawyer Barragan who also denies having the document although has a copy as lawyer. The next day while Esquilache and Vargas Vicuña are driving around looking for the document, from the registrar's office they get the name of the journalist. Vargas hit men arrive at the apartment of journalist, and exchanged fire with those of Tifilis who are already entrenched in there. Esquilache and his driver come soon after and then leave, while Estupiñan and Abuchija are witnesses.

Quica and Silampa are assaulted by a gunman of Tifilis in search of the document and to defend Quica, Silampa takes a beating and is wounded. Quica accidentally kills the thug sttabing him with a knife. Esquilache is being followed by Abuchija and Estupiñan as he arrives in his official car at an apartment where he confronts Barragan - who is extremely agitated and hysterical, and pulling a gun, alternately levels it at the Councilman and his own temple. He has discovered that Esquilache was complicit in the impalement of Pereira Antunez and this is the impaled. The Councilman cannot hide his despising his niece's husband, and in a sudden reversal, Barragan who has been putting the gun into his mouth and to his temple, shoots Esquilache killing him. Quica and Silampa arrive at the scene and seeing the corpse of Esquilache, which fell dramatically several floors, Silampa asks Estupiñan to take care of Quica. The police arrive and handcuff Silampa - as Barragan in his elegant suit calmly escapes. Silampa is taken to the police station where Moya congratulates him on the case being practically solved: Pereira Antúnez was kidnapped and forced to transfer land to Tifilis, possibly after being roughed up. Silampa has deduced that the signature of the document took place in the same room of the brothel where Silampa had been with Quica and taken her picture. Later Pereira had been kidnapped by Vargas Vicuña, possible associated with Susan; and being the package carried by Abuchija to Chocontá, for to force Antunez to sign the Deed, but Pereira died of diabetes - and Vargas and his thugs - unable to get the Deed - impaled him to scare the nudists of the Turkish baths. They also killed Osler Estupiñan, who had a resemblance to Antunez, and buried him as Pereira Antúnez.

Vargas, Tifilis, Susan and, separately, Barragán have been captured. In the school-room where they are being held, Tifilis confesses to Vargas that it was he who had kidnapped Pereira Antúnez - for thinking that his mistress Susan, had not succeeded when Pereira would not sign the document. Accusations and counter-accusations fly -as each reveals the facts about the other finishes into a fight, when Vicuna implies that Tiflis is "gay". Colonel Moya enters the room, and sits in the school-teacher's chair, after fishing out from the trash can a tape-recorder that has the whole incriminating conversation on it. He calmly proposes to them to collaborate with him. Moya, sitting at his desk, recounts for Silampa's benefit the police's closing report - "the Official Version" ! Silampa is enraged at the neatly self-serving concoction of Truth that Moya is pandering but helpless in front of the Colonel's power. The Colonel reminds him he had sex with Quica, actually a teenager, Moya requests Silampa to forget about justice, to go along and publish "the official version" as his journalistic effort and "win the Simon Bolivar Prize for Journalism" so that his girlfriend will return to him upon his getting famous, if not rich - and also to finish the speech for "The Last Supper" and deliver it to him. Silampa leaves impotent, chastened and hemorrhoidal and surprised when sees Vargas Vicuña and Susan Caviedes goes free.

Osler Estupiñan is finally buried in his own tomb. As Silampa finishes writing the speech of Moya, Quica visits Silampa as she has got a job as a crooner in Cartagena, arranged by Estupiñan. She is happy about the opportunity but obviously wants to be with Silampa. She initially enters the doorway of his apartment, but as it becomes clear to her that Silampa chooses his loneliness over the possibility of happiness with her, she slowly drifts outside of the threshold again - reproaching him wistfully for his choosing his mannequin over the living.

The credits start to roll as Moya - sitting on the centre of an impressive dias at a ballroom dinner - declaining his speech.

== Cast ==
- Daniel Giménez Cacho as Víctor Silampa; a journalist who, through an exchange of favors with the police solved the case of a body impaled on the territories of a lake near Bogota.
- César Mora as Estupiñán; a man searching for his brother alive or dead, which ends up being a victim of this crime.
- Martina García as Quica; a prostitute who has a relationship with Silampa almost falls for her even as a minor and ends involved in the events.
- Víctor Mallarino as Esquilache; a Bogota councilman seeking control of the land of the lake and is an accomplice of the impalement of the landowner Pereira Antunez.
- Carlos Benjumea as Coronel Aristofanes Moya: An obese police colonel investigating the case of impalement. He has a close friendship with Silampa and this research gives a speech in return for a sect of thinning.
- Jairo Camargo as Vargas Vicuña: A civil engineer who seeks control of land in the lake, is complicit in Esquilache and Tiflis and who impaled Pereira Antunez.
- Humberto Dorado as Tiflis: An emerald and entrepreneur eccentric owner of a hotel and bar "Lolitas" who inherited of Pereira Antunez the land from the lake.
- Saín Castro as Barragán: A lawyer, husband of the niece of Esquilache. Deed completely legalize reasons for whoever controls the land of the lake.
- Gustavo Angarita as Guzmán: A schizophrenic former journalist mentor of Silampa.
- Mimi Lazo as Susan
- Agmeth Escaf as Cop

== See also ==
- List of Spanish films of 2005
