= Debt (disambiguation) =

A debt is that which one party owes to a second party.

Debt or The Debt may also refer to:

== Films ==
- The Debt (1917 film), a film
- The Debt (1993 film), a drama short film by Bruno de Almeida
- The Debt (1997 film), a Colombian submission for the Academy Award for Best Foreign Language Film
- The Debt (1999 film) or Dług, winner of the 2000 Polish Academy Award for Best Film
- The Debt (2003 film), a British television film directed by Jon Jones
- The Debt (2007 film), an Israeli drama-thriller film
- The Debt (2010 film), an American remake of the Israeli film
- The Debt (2014 film), an American short drama film
- The Debt (2015 film), a Peruvian, Spanish, and American drama film

== Literature ==
- The Debt (2001), a French Casterman comic book album by writer Matz and artist Luc Jacamo
- Debt: The First 5000 Years (2011), a book by anthropologist David Graeber

== Television ==
- Debt (game show), a 1990s American game show
- "Debt" (Law & Order: Special Victims Unit), an episode of Law & Order: Special Victims Unit
- "The Debt" (The Amazing World of Gumball), a 2011 episode of The Amazing World of Gumball
