= 11th Macondo Awards =

- Date: November 5, 2023
- Site: Centro Nacional de las Artes Delia Zapata Olivella; Bogotá, Colombia
- Hosted by: Juana Acosta; Alejandro Riaño

Highlights
- Best Film: The Kings of the World
- Most awards: The Kings of the World (6)
- Most nominations: The Kings of the World (9)

Television coverage
- Network: TNT, HBO Max

The 11th Macondo Awards ceremony, presented by the Colombian Academy of Cinematography Arts and Sciences, honored the best audiovisual productions of 2023. It took place on November 5, 2023, at the Centro Nacional de las Artes Delia Zapata Olivella in Bogotá. The ceremony awarded 20 categories.

== Winners and nominees ==
Best Picture: The Kings of the World; The Pack; A Male; A Mother	Best Director: Laura Mora – The Kings of the World; Jorge Navas – A Ballad for Dead Children; Andrés Ramírez Pulido – The Pack; Fabián Hernández – A Male
Best Actor: Jhon Narváez – Rebellion; Alejandro Aguilar – Ermitaño; José Restrepo – A Mother; Carlos Vergara Montiel – The Red Tree	Best Actress: Marcela Valencia – A Mother; Fabiana Medina – Salvador; Ana María Otálora – Petit Mal; María Fernanda Yepes – Línea de tiempo
Best Supporting Actor: Nelson Camayo – The Border; Alberto Cardeño – A Mother; Hernán Caviativa – Ermitaño; Fabio Velasco – Salvador	Best Supporting Actress: Cristina Zuleta – A Mother; Sandra Cubillos – Salvador; Marcela Robledo – Ultraviolence; Silvia Varón – Petit Mal
Best Screenplay: Andrés Ramírez Pulido – The Pack; Tatiana Andrade, Anne Fabini, Nicolás van Hemelryck, Gustavo Vasco, Clare Weiskopf – Alis; María Camila Arias, Laura Mora – The Kings of the World; Diógenes Cuevas – A Mother	Best Original Score: Daniel Velasco – The Other Shape; Andrés Cárdenas – Ermitaño; Felipe Di Franco, Julián López – Línea de tiempo; Ezra Axelrod – Pepe Cáceres
Best Original Song: Andrés Correa, Camilo Sanabria – "Y si fuera usted" from Salvador; Owen Chamorro, Oscar Mauricio Hernández – "Pájaro de la montaña" from The Red Tree; Alejandro Loaiza, Sandra Serrato – "Cuando estés a mi lado" from Ermitaño; Adriana Lucía, Jairo Barón, David David – "La frontera" from The Border	Best Cinematography: David Gallego – The Kings of the World; Mauricio Vidal – Rebellion; Juana González – Salvador; Sofia Oggioni – A Male
Best Art Direction: Marcela Gómez, Daniel Rincón – The Kings of the World; Sara Millán – La ciudad de las ferias; Johana Agudelo Susa, Daniel Rincón – The Pack; Juan Bernal – A Male	Best Editing: Sebastián Hernández, Gustavo Vasco – The Kings of the World; Sebastián Hernández – A Ballad for Dead Children; Etienne Boussac, Juan Cañola – La Roya; David Rojas – Toro
Best Sound Design: Michelle Couttolenc, Carlos García, Boris Herrera – The Kings of the World; Andrés Acevedo, Oneida Orejuela Barco – Songs that Flood the River; Sebastián Alzate, Estebanoise Brauier, Miller Castro – La ciudad de las fieras; Sebastián Alzate, Alejandro Escobar Vallejo, Daniel Vásquez – La Roya	Best Visual Effects: Juan Manuel Betancourt – A Ballad for Dead Children; Víctor Forigua – The Red Tree; Elmer Villa – The Border; Manuel Barrios – I'm Cris from Tierra Bomba
Best Costume Design: Catherine Rodríguez – Salvador; Luisa Toro – La ciudad de las fieras; Ana Acosta Ospina – The Kings of the World; Daniela Rivano – Pepe Cáceres	Best Makeup: Natalia Prada, Andrés Ramírez – Rebellion; Diana Parra – The Kings of the World; Natalia Prada – Pepe Cáceres; María Clara López – Salvador
Best Documentary: Nicolas van Hemelryck, Clare Weiskopf – Alis; Jorge Navas – A Ballad for Dead Children; Marta Rodríguez – Camilo Torres Restrepo, el amor eficaz; Angélica Cervera – If God were a Woman	Best Animated Feature: Diego Felipe Guzman – The Other Shape; Santiago Caicedo – Virus Tropical; Marcela Rincón – Lila's Book; Oscar Andrade, Jairo Eduardo Carrillo – Little Voices
Best Ibero-American Picture: Santiago Mitre – Argentina, 1985 (Argentina); Manuela Martelli – 1976 (Chile); Rodrigo Sorogoyen – The Beasts (Spain); Tatiana Huezo – Prayers for the Stolen (Mexico)	Best Short Film: Jeferson Cardoza Herrera – Paloquemao; Cristina Sánchez Salamanca – Baby; Jeferson Romero Ruiz – Se alquilan lavadoras; Carlos Gómez Salamanca – Yugo
Audience Award – Best Film: Nina Marín – Tierra quebrá

== See also ==
- List of Colombian films
- Macondo Awards
- 2023 in film
