= Pepe Cáceres (film) =

- Theatrical release poster
- Directed by: Sebastián Eslava; Camilo Molano Parra
- Written by: Sebastian Eslava; Camilo Molano Parra
- Produced by: Camilo Buendía; Camilo Molano Parra
- Starring: Sebastián Eslava
- Cinematography: Mateo Guzmán
- Edited by: Etienne Boussac
- Music by: Ezra Axelrod
- Production companies: Resilience Pictures; Chapinero Films
- Release dates: October 12, 2022 (BIFF); January 19, 2023 (Colombia)
- Running time: 94 minutes
- Country: Colombia
- Language: Spanish

Pepe Cáceres is a 2022 Colombian biographical drama film directed and co-written by Sebastián Eslava and Camilo Molano Parra in their directorial debut. It stars Eslava who plays his father, Pepe Cáceres, where he tells the story of all the years of his life including his rise to fame and his tragic end as a bullfighter.

== Synopsis ==
After living a cruel childhood, Pepe Cáceres finds his passion as a comic bullfighter where little by little he makes a name for himself for his innate talent.

== Cast ==
The actors participating in this film are:

- Sebastián Eslava as Pepe Cáceres
- Sara Casasnovas as Lilian
- Carmenza Cossio as Bertha de Gutierrez
- Valeria Galviz as Luz Marina Zuluaga
- Luis Fernando Hoyos as Carlos Julio Eslava
- Nicolás Coronado as Luis Miguel Dominguín
- Gerardo Calero as Ernesto Gutierrez
- Manuel Navarro as Andrés Gago
- Cristina Warner as Regina Bar Woman
- Néstor Alfonso Rojas as Melanio Murillo
- Aroha Hafez as Macarena
- Abdelali El Aziz as Ali
- Gonzalo Sagarmínaga as Arturo
- Quique Sanmartín as Félix Rodriguez
- Laura Garcia as Silvia
- Fernando Campo as Doctor
- Arcenio Valderrama as Bernardo
- Rosario Montaña as Clementina Cáceres
- Tony Chaparro Cabello as Man Couple Bar Regina
- Leynyker Valderrama as José Eslava
- Cristian Restrepo as Joselito Eslava

== Release ==
Pepe Cáceres had its world premiere on October 12, 2022, at the Bogotá International Film Festival, to then was released commercially on January 19, 2023, in Colombian theaters.

== Accolades ==
Year	Award	Category	Recipient	Result	Ref.
2023	11th Macondo Awards	Best Original Score	Ezra Axelrod	Nominated	
2023	11th Macondo Awards	Best Costume Design	Daniela Rivano	Nominated	
2023	11th Macondo Awards	Best Makeup	Natalia Prada	Nominated	
