= Time to Die (1985 film) =

Tiempo de morir
- Theatrical release poster
- Directed by: Jorge Alí Triana
- Screenplay by: Gabriel García Márquez
- Produced by: Gloria Zea
- Starring: Gustavo Angarita; María Eugenia Dávila; Sebastián Ospina
- Cinematography: Mario García Joya
- Edited by: Nelson Rodríguez
- Music by: Leo Brouwer; Nafer Durán
- Production companies: Focine (Colombia); Icaic (Cuba)
- Distributed by: Focine
- Release dates: 1985 (Havana Film Festival); 15 April 1986 (Colombia)
- Running time: 94 minutes
- Countries: Colombia; Cuba
- Language: Spanish
- Budget: $300.000

A Time to Die (Spanish: Tiempo de morir), also called Time to Die, is a 1985 Colombian drama film directed by Jorge Alí Triana and starring Gustavo Angarita, María Eugenia Dávila and Sebastián Ospina. The script, written by Colombia's Nobel Prize-winning author Gabriel García Márquez, had been shot twice before, first in 1965 by Mexican director, Arturo Ripstein and in 1982 also by Jorge Alí Triana as a TV series produced by RTI Producciones.

Using the style of the Westerns, the film deals with Latin American themes of machismo, family honor and revenge. It was selected as the Colombian entry for the Best Foreign Language Film at the 59th Academy Awards, but was not accepted as a nominee.

Tiempo de morir was very well received and it is considered one of the best Colombian films of the 1980s with Condores no Entierran Todos los dias and Milagro en Roma.

== Plot ==
Juan Sayago, a soft-spoken middle age man, is released from prison after completing an eighteen-year sentence for the death of Raúl Moscote in a duel. Sayago immediately returns to his hometown, a small dusty village of unpaved streets. He wants to forget the past and rebuild his life, but an adverse destiny awaits him. Juan first visits the blacksmith shop of an old friend, but the man died many years ago and, Diego, the new blacksmith and son of his deceased friend, warns Sayago that the two sons of Raúl Moscote have been sworn to avenge the death of their father. However, Juan is not bothered by this danger. He paid for his crime and he is only looking forward to a peaceful old age. At the local cantina, Sayago befriends a young man who is trying to fix the hackamore of his horse. Sayago gives him his, since he does not own a horse anymore. The cantina's owner, Tulio, tells Sayago that the young man is Pedro Moscote, the youngest son of the man he killed. Tulio also warns Sayago that Pedro and his brother want to kill him and that it is better for him to leave the town, but Juan yearns to see Mariana, the woman he was in love with and he was going to marry when he was taken to jail.

Juan visits Mariana, who is now a mature and sober, but still beautiful widow, taking care of her small son. Still mourning the death of her husband, who died a few years before, Mariana is happy to see Juan, but also recommends him to leave the town as his life is under constant threat. Surrounded by impending danger, Juan starts to pick up the threads of his life and begins to rebuild his home, the dilapidated house abandoned since the death of his mother many years ago. Convinced that his enemies will not kill him as long as he does not yield to their provocations, Juan endures, with incredible calmness, the insults and humiliations of Julián Moscote, the oldest of the two sons bent on revenge. Although restless in his hate for Sayago, under a mask of bravado and machisimo, Julián harbors doubts. Even for Julián, to avenge his father's death is a burden dictated by honor. The town's mayor is aware of the threats against Juan Sayago and warns the Moscote brothers that if they disturb the peace he would send them to jail, he also suggest to Juan to move elsewhere, but he can't do much else and the mayor is Pedro's godfather.

In an effort to avoid a new tragedy, Marianna talks to Sonia, Pedro's girlfriend, as she believes that Sonia's destiny is going to repeat her own. Through Sonia's father, the town's doctor, Pedro Moscote learns the real motive and the circumstances behind his father's death. It was Raúl Moscote who, like Julián now, tormented Juan Sayago after losing in a cockfight that Juan won. With a wounded pride and deliriums of greatness, Raúl never accepted his defeat. From then he harassed Juan to provoke him to accept a duel until Juan lost his patience and accepted. in the confrontation Juan killed Raul Moscote with a shot to the heart with a silver bullet, and the urban myth that Juan Sáyago was bulletproof was due to the fact that he had received a shot in a hunting accident, which had left minor wounds healed by the doctor. Meanwhile, Mariana, who can no longer hide her feelings, ends up telling Juan she still loves him. Mariana insists however, that is too late to recover lost time, and she feels she and Juan cannot be happy. Worried about his safety, Mariana gives Juan a gun that belonged to her late husband so he can defend himself if the time comes. As they knit together in a veranda overlooking the river that crosses the town, Mariana tells Juan about the many letters that she wrote him, although he never received them. He promises her a future together if they move to another town, but she assures him that the hate of the Moscote brothers would follow them. Juan tells Mariana no to worry; he leaves taking the gun with him. Julián, as his father did many years earlier, harasses Juan on the streets; in the marketplace and destroys Juan's house collapsing the roof. All this to provoke Juan into a duel, but Juan flatly refuses.

At the town's cemetery, Pedro meets Juan Sayago and asks him to leave the town. He has begun to admire Sayago's self-control and courage. Looking for his brother, Julián arrives at Sonia's house. She confronts him, pleading with him, but to no avail. Furious, Julián finds his brother and Juan Sayago at Tulio's cantina. He begins to shoot, but Pedro manages to stop him. The mayor orders the Moscote brothers to leave the town and Pedro assures Juan that he would fix the situation with his brother. However, Julián does not want to hear any reasons and the two brothers had a terrible fight until they are separated by the workers of their farm. Then, Sayago does not hesitate and tells Julián to meet him in one hour. Juan says farewell to his dearest friend, Casildo, who has been bedridden since he was kicked by a horse long time ago. Juan also visits Mariana. He tells her that he is leaving, but that once he returns it would be forever. Promising her a happy old age together forgetting about the past, he gives her his pocket watch. Understanding what he is going to do, Mariana tells him to be careful. Mariana goes to Sonia's house and tells her that Juan and Julián are going to kill each other. Sonia was cleaning Pedro's wounds from the fight and he leaves in a rush to find them. Juan Sayago and Julián Moscote face each other, but when Pedro arrives it is too late. Julián is lying dead with a gunshot to his head. Juan Sayago gives his gun to Pedro and walks away. Pedro takes the gun and kills him shooting Juan from the back. Destiny has repeated itself.

== Cast ==
- Gustavo Angarita as Juan Sayago
- María Eugenia Dávila as Mariana
- Sebastián Ospina as Julián Moscote, Ospina portrays Raúl Moscote in a portrait and in a flashback.
- Jorge Emilio Salazar as Pedro Moscote
- Reynaldo Miravalles as Casildo
- Enrique Almirante as the Mayor
- Lina Botero as Sonia
- Nelly Moreno as prostitute
- Carlos Barbosa as Demetrio, the doctor
- Héctor Rivas as Don Tulio
- Edgardo Román as Diego
- Lucy Martínez as Rosa
- Mónica Silva as Sonia's Mother
- Luis Chiappe as the barber
- Alicia de Rojas as Mariana’s maid
- Giovanni Vargas as Mariana’s son
- Berta Catano as Dolores
- César Ambalema as Cop

== Production ==
A Time to Die was written for the screen by Gabriel García Márquez in the 1960s in Mexico. Carlos Fuentes collaborated with the dialogues, incorporating Mexican slang. The film, shot in the style of a western, was made in 1966 by Mexican director Arturo Ripstein in his debut as film director.

In 1984 the story was remade as a television miniseries for RTI in Colombia, under the direction of Jorge Alí Triana. Triana worked on the script's dialogues with the help of Eligio García Márquez (1947–2001), a brother of the Nobel Prize winner writer. This television production had the same main cast of this film (Gustavo Angarita, María Eugenia Dávila, Sebastián Ospina and Jorge Emilio Salazar), and it was well received by critics. García Márquez liked the miniseries, but lamented that it had been shot on video and offered Jorge Alí Triana to make it as a feature film.

The film retakes the story of the original script, but incorporates a new key scene written by García Márquez specially for this version. Triana wanted to showcase the fear of the character of Julian Moscote, the oldest brother developing the theme that worse than the fear of dying is the fear of killing. One week before production started, the Nobel prize winner wrote the scene in which the prostitute reads Julian his fortune in the cards. The film employed the same main cast of the miniseries, but added two notable Cuban actors in the roles of the major and Casildo.

The film was a production between Colombia and Cuba, made with a budget of 300,000 dollars. Focine, the Colombian Institutional Company of Cinematography, gave 200,000 and el Instituto Cubano de Arte e Industria Cinematográficos, ICAIC, contributed 100,000 dollars. It was photographed by Cuban cameraman Mario Garcia Joya and it was edited in La Habana. The film was shot on location in the department of Tolima, Colombia, the director's native region, in Ambalema, Armero, Guamo, Honda, Mariquita, Natagaima, Prado, Purificación, Hacienda El Triunfo (Tolima). The main location was the city of Armero. Four months after finishing principal photography of the film, Amero was completely destroyed by the eruption of the Nevado del Ruiz.

While working in the post-production of the film in Cuba, Jorge Alí Triana saw Ripstein's version for the first time. The two films are very different in style and approach. Ripstein's predecessor resembles more the classical American western as a revenge drama. Triana's film reflects more the tropical flavor that Gabriel García Márquez intended. It is less symbolic that Ripstein's film and more of a denunciation of Latin American machismo.

== See also ==
- List of submissions to the 59th Academy Awards for Best Foreign Language Film
- List of Colombian submissions for the Academy Award for Best Foreign Language Film
