= Caín (film) =

1984 film

- Theatrical release poster
- Directed by: Gustavo Nieto Roa
- Screenplay by: Gustavo Nieto Roa
- Based on: Caín by Eduardo Caballero Calderón
- Produced by: Gustavo Nieto Roa; Luis Enrique Nieto
- Starring: Armando Gutiérrez; Marta Liliana Ruiz; Jorge Emilio Salazar
- Cinematography: Mario Gonzalez
- Edited by: Gabriel González Balli; Agustín Pinto
- Music by: Luis Antonio Escobar
- Production company: Focine
- Distributed by: Focine
- Release date: 5 July 1984
- Running time: 110 minutes
- Country: Colombia
- Language: Spanish

Caín is a 1984 Colombian drama film directed by Gustavo Nieto Roa. The film is based on the eponymous novel by Eduardo Caballero Calderón. The plot, told in retrospect, sets the biblical story of Cain and Abel in 1960s rural Colombia. It follows the bitter rivalry between two brothers over the love of one woman.

== Plot ==
Years 20s to early 1960

In the mid-1920s, Don Polo, a rich influential landowner and politician, has an affair with Dionisia, the housekeeper in his farm, which is called El Paraíso (Paradise). From this relationship a son is born, whom Don Polo suggests he name Martín, in order to train him as a farmer and make him the foreman of his farm, near to Sogamoso. Three years later, Don Polo's legitimate wife has a has only single one legitimate son, whom he names Abel, therefore legitimate. However, Don Polo's wife dies in childbirth, and Abel is left in the care of Dionisia as his nurse. From that moment on, Martín begins to be treated by Don Polo as just another peasant and is forbidden from approaching Abel.

Despite Don Polo's restrictions, Abel establishes a good fraternal relationship with Martín and with Ángela, an attractive intellectually disabled girl who helps Dionisia with her chores. Martín and Abel have grown up together but in very different circumstances; Abel does attend school, unlike Martín has been treated not like a son but like any other peasant in the farm. In spite of these differences, the two brothers have had a good relationship in which the older and more experienced Martín keeps the upper hand, does not prevent Martín from being jealous of Abel.

As adults, Abel, who is spoiled, naive and weak before, watches Angela bathing naked and, encouraged by Martin, they both have sex with her and are later scared away by Dionisia. Then Martin gives Abel a cigarette, seeing that he had become a man. Not many years later, Martín and his childhood friend Pedro are serving in the army. Pedro is also Don Polo's neighbor and arrives with Martín at the farm to claim the lands of his father Luis Antonio, taken by Don Polo during La Violencia while Pedro and his brother Gilberto had fled to Bogotá to seek their fortune. Don Polo dismisses Pedro's claims and throws him out of his house.

Their friendship breaks up with the arrival of Margarita Reyes, a beautiful young woman from a penniless aristocratic family. Margarita’s father was the previous owner of El Paraíso. Margarita arrives at the farm with her aunt and grandmother, former owners of Don Polo's farm, who as administrator sold several of their possessions and bought the farm since they were on the verge of bankruptcy. Abel and Margarita become friends, which later becomes a courtship. Abel introduces Margarita to Martin, openly confessing that he is his half-brother. Both brothers are attracted to the sweet and flirty Margarita and she is torn between the two.

Abel, like his father, begins to treat Martín like just another peasant in front of Margarita, which makes her angry. Margarita confesses to the priest Hoyos is more attracted to the handsome and masculine Martín, but Abel is more pliable, and being rich he suits her aspiration of money and position. The priest suggests that he stay away from Martin and do penance. Pressured by the family priest, Margarita ends up marrying Martín, a decision she soon regrets since Margarita refuses to live like a peasant, Martín consequently chases her and whips her with several ropes, and then rapes Angela. Martín, victim of his wife’s social prejudices, leaves the farm. Margarita talks to Abel, now Lieutenant of the army, about what happened and asks for his help. Martín, who was actually hiding inside the farm the whole time dressed yet with the wedding suit, witnesses all this and follows them, Margarita then asks Abel to live with her, and in the midst of his constant fantasies, decides to kill Abel. However, while Abel goes with his father to resolve some matters, Martín appears angry at having witnessed everything and rapes Margarita.

1960

Months later, during a night, Martín infiltrates the farm and after seeing Abel and Margarita sleeping in their married bed, Martín takes out his machete and kills Abel. He then kidnaps Margarita and takes her away in Abel's truck, which Martín then throws into a ravine. The next morning, Dionisia discovers Abel's corpse, which is also observed by the other peasants, and they decide to report the crime to the police and they contact Don Polo in Bogotá. In an initially inhumane manner, Martín takes a pregnant Margarita across the plains towards the forest and the mountains, but when she tells him that she is cold, hungry and thirsty, and her feet are almost battered, Martín gives her his ruana, his espadrilles and gives her water from a nearby stream.

While Martin is still carrying Angela, the police question Dionisia. Later, Abel's body is laid to rest and then buried, while the national and departmental authorities offer Don Polo their support and condolences. While Martin is taking a nap, Margarita sees a boy taking care of a goat and its young and asks him for help by giving her her gold necklace. This does not prevent Martin from taking Margarita, but the boy notifies his parents, two peasants named Ezequiel and his wife Valeria, acquaintances of Martin, who decide to go to the authorities after the boy confirms what happened. Then Martin gives Margarita goat's milk to drink directly from one and then they continue on their way.

After of walking over Colombia’s eastern plains and joins a guerrilla group led by Pedro, now nicknamed Pedro Palos, his old friend from his childhood and military service. Despite being welcomed, as Martin makes the bandits believe that Margarita is his wife, the only one who disagrees is 'El Doctorcito', a leftist-minded Bogotá-educated doctor who wants to replicate the Cuban Revolution in Colombia, and warns that Martin will only bring trouble. At night, Pedro Palos' gang decides to raid Puntalarga, a nearby town to steal money, food and medicine, even though 'El Doctorcito' disagrees and is determined to start a revolution. The Puntalarga town is attacked by Pedro Palos, Martín and the bandits where, in addition to committing looting, they murder several police officers.

Don Polo, who the day before had demanded that the army look for the bandits in the mountains, learns of the attack on Puntalarga, confirming the presence of Martín with the bandits. Don Polo offers a reward of 250,000 Colombian pesos to anyone who gives information about Martín and Margarita. By the radio Martín, accused of killing Abel, is being sought by the authorities. In addition, they learn about the reward offered, but this makes the guerrilla fighters argue among themselves since they want to distribute the reward money but taking different paths. Pedro, also informed, refuses to betray Martin. Ezequiel, Valeria and their son arrive at the barracks to report the whereabouts of Pedro Palos, but end up imprisoned under suspicion of being collaborators of the bandits. When Don Polo finds out that Margarita is pregnant, he offers 500,000 Colombian pesos as a reward for Margarita and her baby, being his grandson. Then the army arrives near the mountains where Pedro Palos and his bandits are hiding. The sentries of the gang spot the army and although they consider fighting, ammunition is scarce, so they decide to abandon the camp. Martín refuses to leave since the baby is about to be born. A small battle breaks out in which several bandits are killed, despite putting up considerable resistance, but the survivors must flee due to the army's numerical superiority.

In the meantime Margarita gives birth to Abel’s son, although it is believed that the child could be Martin's, the product of the rape. Don Polo offers a ransom for Margarita and his newborn grandson. Don Polo orders the priest, blaming him for everything, to give the reward money, to which the priest compunctiously accepts. Pedro Palos, together with a few wounded bandits and others still unharmed, leave the camp to go into the jungle. Don Polo, in a small plane accompanied by army officers, sends a message, which says that, in addition to the reward, they give the bandits 3 days of truce in exchange for handing over Margarita and her newborn son. The Doctorcito thinks it is a trap and refuses to accept the truce, in addition to hate Martín for being fratricidal, and insulting Margarita. Martín fights and kills him by drowning him in the river. Despite agreeing with Doctorcito in which Martin only brought problems, Pedro wants to claim the money offered by Don Polo, Margarita refuses to return to her normal life. Despite her pleas, Pedro decides to share the reward money and take Martin with him since he values him as a friend. Margarita still refuses to be handed over to Don Polo, supported by Martín, but a fight breaks out between Martín and Pedro that culminates in a machete duel where Martín kills his best friend. After Pedro's death, the rest of the bandits decided to surrender to the army. Margarita decided to stay with Martín despite being pursued by the authorities. It was later learned that both were still alive without being found by Don Polo or the authorities.

== Cast ==
- Armando Gutiérrez as Martín
- Marta Liliana Ruíz as Margarita
- Jorge Emilio Salazar as Abel Rodríguez
- Adolfo Blum as Don Polo Rodríguez
- Carmenza Gómez as Dionisia
- Sebastián Ospina as Pedro Palos
- Luis Eduardo Arango as el doctorcito
- Martha Stella Calle as Angela
- Mario Sastre as Father Hoyos
- Martha Suarez as guerillera
- Vicky Hernández as Valeria
- Waldo Urrego as Romero
- Jairo Soto as Gordo Santana
- Antonio Aparicio as Toño

== Production ==
Caín was the first film produced by Focine (Colombian National Film Bureau). It was inspired by the novel of the same name written by Eduardo Caballero Calderón in 1968. The film was entirely made in Colombia as part of a project created during the presidency of Belisario Betancur to promote the development of Colombia's film industry. Caín was shot in Boyacá, Cundinamarca and the eastern Colombian plains. Most of the farm scenes where shot in Sogamoso. The Hotel Hacienda Suescún in Tibasosa, Boyaca, served as the farm El Paraíso, central in the film.

== Reception ==
Caín premiered at the 44° International film festival of Cartagena on 5 July 1984. The film was controversial among critics, but did well at the box office. Caín received an award at the Hall of Fame in New York; an India Catalina at the International Film festival in Cartagena; an Antena Award given by APE (Association of film critics) and awards from Colcultura. Eduardo Caballero Calderón, author of the novel that inspired the film, was satisfied with the adaptation, but did not wish to see the film to avoid a comparison with the characters and scenarios that were in his imagination.
