= La pena máxima =

La pena máxima may refer to:

- La pena máxima (2001 film), Colombian film
- La pena máxima, novel by Santiago Roncagliolo
  - La pena máxima (2022 film), Peruvian film, based on the novel
