= Benjamin Odell =

Benjamin Odell may refer to:

- Benjamin Odell (politician) (1854–1926), American politician from New York
- Benjamin Odell (producer) (born 1969), American writer, director and producer of independent films
