= Confessing to Laura =

1991 film by Jaime Osorio Gómez

- Theatrical release poster
- Directed by: Jaime Osorio Gómez
- Screenplay by: Alexandra Cardona Restrepo
- Produced by: Alexandra Cardona Restrepo
- Starring: Vicky Hernández; Gustavo Londoño; Maria Cristina Gálvez
- Cinematography: Adriano Moreno
- Edited by: Nelson Rodríguez
- Music by: Gonzalo Rubalcaba
- Distributed by: Melies Producciones
- Release date: 1991
- Running time: 85 minutes
- Countries: Colombia; Cuba; Spain
- Language: Spanish

Confessing to Laura (Spanish: Confesión a Laura) is a 1991 Colombian drama film directed by Jaime Osorio Gómez. The film is set during El Bogotazo, a violent rioting that erupted in Bogotá after the assassination of presidential candidate Jorge Eliécer Gaitán on 9 April 1948. The story is about an oppressed husband forced by the circumstances to spend the day at his neighbor's home, a lonely, mature schoolteacher. The film was selected as the Colombian entry for the Best Foreign Language Film at the 64th Academy Awards, but was not accepted as a nominee.

== Plot ==
Newsreel footage shows Colombian presidential candidate Jorge Eliécer Gaitán speaking to a large crowd. Following his assassination on April 9, 1948, a riot erupts. It is an uncontrollable manifestation of emotion, which grows bigger through the setting of fire to vehicles and buildings. The enraged crowds spread all over the streets of Bogotá, destroying everything they find.

Among the chaos engulfing the city, Santiago Franco, a middle-aged government employee reaches his apartment in downtown Bogotá. His wife Josefina is undisturbed by the revolt that has taken over the city. She has baked a birthday cake for her neighbor Laura, a spinster schoolteacher living in an apartment directly across from them. The overbearing Josefina is irritated by her husband insistence in the seriousness of the situation. Santiago listens intently to the radio, eager for news. The situation is getting worse. While people are being killed in the streets, Josefina tells her husband that he should go see if he can be of some help to the government. She adds: "I'd do it if I were you." She then tells Santiago to go across the street and up to Laura's apartment to deliver the birthday cake. It is Laura's birthday. Santiago objects, trying to show her the danger by having her look out the window at the street, where shots can be heard. When Josefina prepares to take the cake herself, Santiago is compelled into delivering the cake.

Barely managing to cross the street, when Santiago knocks on the door of Laura's apartment a loud explosion occurs and he is knocked to the floor. The cake is almost completely destroyed. Laura helps him to his feet. Soon after Josefina calls and talks to Santiago. She tells him to come back immediately after hearing that the riots are reaching their neighborhood. Santiago prepares to return home, but Laura reminds him of the danger. However, he chooses to believe his wife's insistence that the situation is not dangerous. Laura asks him a good question: "How does she know?" However, Santiago insists on obeying his wife. He tells Laura to come with him to his apartment. With some reluctance because of Josefina's attitude, she agrees. Just as they start to leave the apartment, many gunshots are heard. They look out the window to see people running frantically and they also see a dead man in the street. Sniper fire from the rooftops is adding to the dangers and they decide to stay. Santiago tries to soothe Laura, who is very worried about what will happen to them. He has her sit down and he prepares some lemon balm tea for her. To kill time Santiago and Laura play cards and listen to some tango songs. Santiago is a good singer and he intones the songs of Carlos Gardel. The couple begins to have a good time.

Away from the controlling ways of Josefina, Santiago and Laura, begin to talk. Laura is very different from Josefina. She is supportive rather than critical of Santiago. She wants to hear his opinions, as opposed to Josefina's wanting to dominate. They begin a relationship that seems to bring out the best in each other. What follows is an openness of their intimate feelings. Neither is she the respectable spinster that she would like to be nor is he the man he wish he would have been. Both have lived lives of pretensions.

When night arrives, they make love. A deep connection has occurred between them. Through the back of the building where she lives, Laura helps Santiago to escape to the streets into a new life. The next day things have calmed down in the city. Believing that her husband has been killed trying to cross the street back home, Josefina comes to Laura's apartment crying. Laura hugs her.

== Cast ==
- Vicky Hernández as Laura
- Gustavo Londoño as Santiago
- Maria Cristina Gálvez as Josefina

== Awards ==
- Best Actress (Vicky Hernández) at 1991 Havana Film Festival.

== See also ==
- List of submissions to the 64th Academy Awards for Best Foreign Language Film
- List of Colombian submissions for the Academy Award for Best Foreign Language Film
