= Bogotá International Film Festival =

- Location: Bogotá, Colombia
- Founded: 2015
- Awards: Premio del Público Air France-KLM
- Website: www.biff.co

The Bogotá International Film Festival or BIFF is an annual international film festival held in Bogotá, Colombia.

== Premio del Público Air France-KLM winners ==
Year	Film	Director	Country
2015	The Little Prince	Mark Osborne	France
2016	El Amparo	Rober Calzadilla	Venezuela
2017	Adriana's Pact	Lissette Orozco	Chile
2018	El Piedra	Rafael Martínez	Colombia
2019	Papicha	Mounia Meddour	Algeria
2020	A Loss of Something Ever Felt	Carlos Eduardo Lesmes	Estonia
2021	On the Other Side	Iván Guarnizo	Colombia
2022	Alis	Clare Weiskopf	Colombia
