= List of submissions to the 53rd Academy Awards for Best Foreign Language Film =

1980 Best Foreign Language Film submissions

Highlights
- Oscar winner: (Soviet Union) Moscow Does Not Believe in Tears
- Submissions: 26
- Debuts: 4

This is a list of submissions to the 53rd Academy Awards for Best Foreign Language Film. The Academy Award for Best Foreign Language Film was created in 1956 by the Academy of Motion Picture Arts and Sciences to honour non-English-speaking films produced outside the United States. The award is handed out annually, and is accepted by the winning film's director, although it is considered an award for the submitting country as a whole. Countries are invited by the Academy to submit their best films for competition according to strict rules, with only one film being accepted from each country.

For the 53rd Academy Awards, twenty-six films were submitted in the category Academy Award for Best Foreign Language Film. Cameroon, Colombia, Iceland and Portugal all submitted films for the first time. Iceland has submitted a film every year since then, while Cameroon did not submit again until 2017. The five nominated films came from France, Hungary, Japan and Spain.

The Soviet Union won for the third time with the Moscow Does Not Believe in Tears by Vladimir Menshov.

== Submissions ==
Submitting country	Film title used in nomination	Original title	Language(s)	Director(s)	Result
Austria	Egon Schiele – Exzess und Bestrafung	Egon Schiele - Exzesse	German, English, French	Herbert Vesely	Not nominated
Brazil	Bye Bye Brazil	Bye Bye Brasil	Brazilian Portuguese	Carlos Diegues	Not nominated
Cameroon	Our Daughter	Notre fille	French	Daniel Kamwa	Not nominated
Canada	Good Riddance	Les Bons débarras	French	Francis Mankiewicz	Not nominated
Colombia	The Latin Immigrant	El inmigrante latino	Spanish	Gustavo Nieto Roa	Not nominated
Czechoslovakia	Love Between the Raindrops	Lásky mezi kapkami deště	Czech	Karel Kachyňa	Not nominated
Finland	Tulipää		Finnish	Pirjo Honkasalo and Pekka Lehto	Not nominated
France	The Last Metro	Le Dernier Métro	French	François Truffaut	Nominated
East Germany	The Fiancee	Die Verlobte	German	Günther Rücker and Günter Reisch	Not nominated
West Germany	Fabian		German	Wolf Gremm	Not nominated
Hungary	Confidence	Bizalom	Hungarian, German	István Szabó	Nominated
Iceland	Land and Sons	Land og synir	Icelandic	Ágúst Guðmundsson	Not nominated
India	Payal Ki Jhankaar	पायल की झंकार	Hindi	Satyen Bose	Not nominated
Israel	The Thin Line	על חבל דק	Hebrew	Michal Bat-Adam	Not nominated
Italy	A Leap in the Dark	Salto nel vuoto	Italian	Marco Bellocchio	Not nominated
Japan	Kagemusha	影武者	Japanese	Akira Kurosawa	Nominated
Netherlands	In for Treatment	Opname	Dutch	Marja Kok and Erik van Zuylen	Not nominated
Norway	Life and Death	Liv og død	Norwegian	Petter Vennerød and Svend Wam	Not nominated
Poland	Olympics 40	Olimpiada 40	Polish	Andrzej Kotkowski	Not nominated
Portugal	Morning Undersea	Manhã Submersa	Portuguese	Lauro António	Not nominated
Soviet Union	Moscow Does Not Believe in Tears	Москва слезам не верит	Russian	Vladimir Menshov	Won Academy Award
Spain	The Nest	El nido	Spanish	Jaime de Armiñán	Nominated
Sweden	Herr Puntila and His Servant Matti	Herr Puntila och hans dräng Matti	Swedish	Ralf Långbacka	Not nominated
Switzerland	Every Man for Himself	Sauve qui peut (la vie)	French	Jean-Luc Godard	Not nominated
Taiwan	The Legend of Six Dynasty	六朝怪談	Mandarin	Guk-Gam Wong	Not nominated
Yugoslavia	Special Treatment	Poseban tretman	Serbo-Croatian	Goran Paskaljević	Not nominated

== Sources ==
- Margaret Herrick Library, Academy of Motion Picture Arts and Sciences
