= The Latin Immigrant =

1980 film

- Directed by: Gustavo Nieto Roa
- Starring: Carlos Benjumea
- Release date: 25 December 1980
- Running time: 89 minutes
- Country: Colombia
- Language: Spanish

The Latin Immigrant (Spanish: El inmigrante latino) is a 1980 Colombian comedy film directed by Gustavo Nieto Roa, and starring Carlos Benjumea. The film was selected as the Colombian entry for the Best Foreign Language Film at the 53rd Academy Awards, but was not accepted as a nominee.

== Cast ==
- Carlos Benjumea
- Franky Linero

== See also ==
- List of submissions to the 53rd Academy Awards for Best Foreign Language Film
- List of Colombian submissions for the Academy Award for Best Foreign Language Film
