= Benjamin Odell (producer) =

American film producer

- Born: 1969 (age 56–57); Pennsylvania
- Education: St. Lawrence University (BA); Columbia University (MFA)
- Occupation: Producer

Benjamin Odell (born 1969) is an American writer, director, and producer of independent films.

== Early life and education ==
Odell was born in 1969. He grew up in Pennsylvania, where, aged six, he became friends with a child from Colombia who was living with neighbours but more or less "adopted" by his own father, and the two families became friends. Odell loved the way the family interacted and expressed "warmth and lust for life [he] hadn't really experienced in suburban white America", and developed a love of Latino / Latin American culture. He visited Colombia when he was 15.

He Graduated from Kent School, Kent, Connecticut in 1987 and St. Lawrence University with a Bachelor of Arts in 1991. In 1992, a year after finishing college, took up a job offer in commercial production in Colombia, and went there to learn Spanish. He lived there until 2000, working as a freelance journalist and then as a Spanish language television writer and screenwriter.

On his return from Columbia he went to film school at Columbia University and graduated with a master of fine arts in 2004.

== Career ==
=== Colombia ===
In Colombia (1992–2000), Odell created over 300 hours of Spanish-language narrative for television, including Fuego Verde, an action series which became one of the highest-rated series on Colombian television.

He also co-wrote a feature film called Golpe de estadio (Time Out), a political satire which was nominated for the Goya Award for Best Spanish Language Foreign Film in 1999, was Colombia's Academy Awards entry in 2000 and remains one of the highest-grossing Colombian films of all time.

=== United States ===
In his second year of film school in 2005, Odell produced the feature film Confess as a thesis project, starring Ali Larter and Melissa Leo, on a low budget. The storyline follows a disgruntled computer hacker, recently out of prison, who seeks to take revenge on those who helped to get him there, and later turns political.

In 2006, Odell joined Panamax Films, which was founded by James M. McNamara, former CEO and president of the Spanish-language television network, Telemundo Communications.

The Spanish-language thriller, Sangre de mi sangre, also titled Padre Nuestro and directed by fellow Columbia Film School MFA Christopher Zalla, tells the story of a pair of Mexican immigrants in New York City. In May, 2008, the film was released by IFC Films, after which it received two Independent Spirit Awards nominations, for Best First Feature (for which Odell was nominated) and Best Screenplay.

In 2007, continuing his work with Panamax Films, Odell produced Ladron Que Roba a Ladron, which was released in the United States by Lionsgate. The New York Times called the Spanish-language heist movie an "effervescent comedy".

He co-wrote Sin Memoria with Sebastián Borensztein (2011).

Eugenio Derbez and Ben Odell were executive producers on behalf of 3Pas Studios of the 2021 television series Acapulco, which stars Derbez.

== Current role ==
Odell is a partner of 3pas Studios with Mexican comedian and director Eugenio Derbez.

== Filmography ==
- From Prada to Nada (2011) (executive producer)
- Sin Memoria (2010) (producer, writer)
- All Inclusive (2008) (executive producer)
- Violanchelo (2008) (executive producer) a.k.a. Love, Pain and Vice Versa
- Ladrón que roba a ladrón (2007) (producer)
- Padre Nuestro (2007) (producer) a.k.a. Sangre de mi sangre
- Confess (2005) (producer)
- La mujer de mi hermano (2005) (executive producer)
- Perder es cuestión de método (2004) (associate producer)
