= Oedipus Mayor =

1996 film

- Theatrical release poster
- Directed by: Jorge Alí Triana
- Screenplay by: Gabriel García Márquez; Stella Malagon
- Based on: Oedipus Rex by Sophocles
- Produced by: Jorge Sánchez; Tomás Zapata
- Starring: Jorge Perugorria; Ángela Molina; Francisco Rabal; Jairo Camargo
- Cinematography: Rodrigo Prieto
- Edited by: Sigfrido Barjau
- Music by: Blas Emilio Atehortúa
- Release date: 23 August 1996
- Running time: 100 minutes
- Country: Colombia
- Language: Spanish

Oedipus Mayor (Spanish: Edipo alcalde) is a 1996 Colombian tragedy film, produced by Tomás Zapata and Jorge Sánchez, directed by Jorge Alí Triana. Set in strife-ridden, 20th-century Colombia, the film is a modern-day interpretation of Sophocles' classical Greek tragedy Oedipus Rex. The film was selected as the Colombian entry for the Best Foreign Language Film at the 69th Academy Awards, but was not accepted as a nominee.

== Plot ==
Set amidst the rebel wars (representing the Theban plagues) of contemporary Colombia, young Mayor Edipo must mediate a peace deal between conflicting guerrilla groups and the army. It is raining when he leaves. His journey is interrupted when he gets into a shoot-out on a lonely bridge. Returning fire, Edipo somehow escapes. As soon as he gets to town he hears that a prominent leader Layo was brutally slain. No one knows who shot him. Meanwhile, a blind coffin-maker Tiresias wanders town making dire prophecies concerning Edipo's future. It is he who tells the mayor that Layo was murdered by a family member. Edipo's fate is sealed when he gets involved with the beautiful and much older Yocasta, a woman who last had sex thirty years ago with her husband Layo. She got pregnant and bore a son ... tragedy ensues.

== Cast ==
- Jorge Perugorria – Edipo
- Ángela Molina – Yocasta
- Francisco Rabal – Tiresias
- Jairo Camargo – Creonte
- Jorge Martínez de Hoyos – Priest
- Miriam Colón – Deyanira
- Juan Sebastián Aragón – Police Commander
- Armando Gutiérrez – Army Captain
- Marcela Agudelo –
- Fabiana Medina – Guerrilla Child
- Juan Carlos Arango – AUC Commander
- Magali Caicedo
- Manuel José Chávez – Guerrilla Child
- Sigifredo Vega
- Alfonso Ortiz – Landowners
- Héctor Rivas
- Andrés Felipe Martínez
- Raúl Santa
- Salomón Vega
- Jaime Forero
- Carlos Vega

== See also ==
- List of submissions to the 69th Academy Awards for Best Foreign Language Film
- List of Colombian submissions for the Academy Award for Best Foreign Language Film
