= Frank Ramírez =

Colombian actor (1939–2015)

- Born: Frank Augusto Ramírez Mateus; 12 February 1939; Aguazul, Casanare, Colombia
- Died: 19 February 2015 (aged 76); Marly, Bogotá, Colombia
- Occupation: Actor
- Years active: 1968–2015

Frank Augusto Ramírez Mateus (12 February 1939 – 19 February 2015) was a Colombian actor and television director, playing roles in various series, both American and Colombian.

== Biography ==
Ramírez was the son of Jorge Ismael Ramírez Rojas, pharmacist and member of the Colombian Liberal Party, and Cecilia Mateus Rico. Ramírez studied at the Escuela Nacional de Arte Dramático in Bogotá, but left for the United States in 1964, studying under Actors Studio tutelage. While in the U.S., he took on roles in series such as Barnaby Jones, Lou Grant, and The Flying Nun.

After returning to Colombia, he appeared in the films Cóndores no entierran todos los días (1984), La estrategia del caracol (1993), and the telenovela La Saga, Negocio de Familia (2004). Ramírez's last role was the Colombian version of Héctor Salamanca in Metástasis, a Spanish-language remake of Breaking Bad. He died at age 76, at Clínica Marly, of Parkinson's disease, in 2015.

== Filmography ==
A partial filmography follows.

=== Television ===
- The Flying Nun (1968) "The Crooked Convent" (S2E2)
- The Mary Tyler Moore Show (1971) "He's No Heavy...He's My Brother" (S02, E03)
- Gunsmoke (1973) "Whelan's Men" (S18E20) as Breed
- Pecados Capitales (2003)
- La Saga, Negocio de Familia (2004)
- En los tacones de Eva (2006) as Jesús Mejía
- Metástasis (2014) as Héctor Salamanca

=== Film ===
- Smith! (1968)
- The Sacketts (1979)
- A Man of Principle (1984)
- Cóndores no entierran todos los días (1984)
- Técnicas de duelo (1988)
- Milagro en Roma (1988)
- María Cano (1990)
- Río Negro (1991)
- The Strategy of the Snail (1993)
- Águilas no cazan moscas (1994)
