= The Kings of the World =

- English-language film poster
- Spanish: Los reyes del mundo
- Directed by: Laura Mora Ortega
- Written by: Maria Camila Arias; Laura Mora Ortega
- Produced by: Cristina Gallego; Paz Lázaro; Elisa Fernanda Pirir; Regina Solórzano; Mirlanda Torres
- Starring: Carlos Andrés Castañeda; Davison Florez; Brahian Acevedo; Cristian Campaña; Cristian David Duque
- Cinematography: David Gallego
- Edited by: Sebastian Hernandez; Gustavo Vasco
- Music by: Leonardo Heiblum; Alexis Ruiz
- Production companies: Caracol Televisión; Ciudad Lunar Producciones; Dago García Producciones; Iris Productions; Tu Vas Voir Production; Talipot Studio; Mer Films
- Release dates: September 21, 2022 (Zinemaldia); October 13, 2022 (Colombia)
- Running time: 103 minutes
- Countries: Colombia; Luxembourg; France; Mexico; Norway
- Language: Spanish

The Kings of the World (Spanish: Los reyes del mundo) is a 2022 drama road movie co-written and directed by Laura Mora Ortega. Set in Medellín, the drama is about five teenage friends who live on the streets. As a result, they leave a Colombian city to start over in the countryside. The film premiered in September 2022 at the 70th San Sebastián International Film Festival where it won the Golden Shell for Best Picture.

== Synopsis ==
Rá, Culebro, Sere, Winny and Nano live on the streets of Medellín. The five children no longer have any contact with their families. They form a kind of fraternal clan in which they have to make their way in a parallel world without laws. In doing so, they uphold ideals such as friendship and dignity, but also display disobedience and resistance. In a dangerous journey between delirium and nothingness, the group leaves the city and enters the depths of the Colombian interior. There they hope to find a piece of land that Rá inherited from his late grandmother. Like thousands of other Colombians, she was once violently expelled by the paramilitaries. After her death, Rá received the "promised land" through a government restitution program. The boys make friends that help them advance but also warn them of the dangers of their company. They also meet sex workers who provide them with short-term maternity care.

== Cast ==
- Carlos Andrés Castañeda as Rá
- Davison Florez as Sere
- Brahian Acevedo as Nano
- Cristian Campaña as Winny
- Cristian David Duque as Culebro

== Release ==
=== Festivals ===
The Kings of the World premiered on 21 September 2022 at the 70th San Sebastián International Film Festival. The work was previously screened to international distributors at the 2022 Toronto International Film Festival, along with ten other critically acclaimed films. Other invitations followed in the film festival programs of Zurich (September) and Chicago (October).

=== Theatrical ===
The film was theatrically released in Colombia on 13 October 2022, with opening attendance figures below expectations (28,117 admissions throughout the first 5 days of its theatrical run).

=== International ===
On October 24, 2022, Netflix acquires the film for distribution in the Americas (except Colombia-Mexico). It premiered on the platform on January 4, 2023. Bteam Pictures will distribute in theaters in Spain.

== Reception ==
=== Critical reception ===
According to the review aggregation website Rotten Tomatoes, The Kings of the World has a 96% approval rating based on 27 reviews from critics, with an average rating of 8.2/10. The site's consensus reads, "Journeying between lyricism and brutal reality, The Kings of the World is a hopeful trip towards freedom away from the city where it cruelly dead ends".

Cristóbal Soage of Cineuropa praised the film as an "extraordinary work" and the director Mora "as one of the greatest talents on the modern Latin American film scene," as well as the young actors of the same name. It is "a hallucinogenic story as cruel and painful as it is fascinating". He also raved about David Gallego's camera work, which captures "the poignant beauty of the Colombian jungle [...] in all its splendor." Soage described the scenes between the boys and the sex workers as "particularly moving". "In the end, we feel that we have witnessed an important work, a portrait of a time and place as comprehensive and precise as it is poetic and moving," says the critic.

Guy Lodge (Variety) saw a "raw, offbeat coming-of-age drama" that transcends the sentimentality that tends to dominate the genre "with a delirious, even surreal energy in its five-story Medellin street children".

=== Accolades ===
For The Kings of the World, Laura Mora won the Golden Shell at the San Sebastián International Film Festival, as well as the Feroz Zinemaldia Prize and the SIGNIS Prize from the World Catholic Association for the communication. It has also been invited to international feature film competitions at the Zurich and Chicago festivals.

Year	Award	Category	Recipient	Result	Ref.
2022	70th San Sebastián International Film Festival	Golden Shell	Laura Mora Ortega	Won	
2022	70th San Sebastián International Film Festival	Feroz Zinemaldia Award	Laura Mora Ortega	Won	
2022	70th San Sebastián International Film Festival	SIGNIS Awards	Laura Mora Ortega	Won	
2022	Oslo Films from the South Festival	Silver Mirror Award - Best Feature	The Kings of the World	Nominated	
2022	Oslo Films from the South Festival	Silver Mirror Award - Honorable Mention	The Kings of the World	Won	
2022	11th International Film Festival of Panama	IFF Panama - In Competition	The Kings of the World	Nominated	
2022	58th Chicago International Film Festival	Silver Hugo - Best Production Design	Marcela Gómez Montoya & Daniel Rincon	Won	
2022	58th Chicago International Film Festival	Gold Hugo - Best Feature	The Kings of the World	Nominated	
2022	Warsaw International Film Festival	Crème de la Crème Award	The Kings of the World	Won	
2022	18th Zurich Film Festival	Golden Eye Award	The Kings of the World	Won	
2023	The Hague Movies that Matter Festival	Grand Jury Fiction Award	The Kings of the World	Nominated	
2023	The Hague Movies that Matter Festival	Students' Choice Award	The Kings of the World	Nominated	
2023	13th Luxembourg City Film Festival	Grand Prix - Official Competition	The Kings of the World	Nominated	
2023	International Cinephile Society Awards	Best Cinematography	David Gallego	Nominated	
2023	10th Platino Awards	Best Original Score	Leonardo Heiblum & Alexis Ruíz	Nominated	
2023	10th Platino Awards	Best Cinematography	David Gallego	Nominated	
2023	10th Platino Awards	Best Editing	Sebastián Hernández & Gustavo Vasco	Nominated	
2023	10th Platino Awards	Best Sound	Carlos García	Nominated	
2023	11th Macondo Awards	Best Picture	The Kings of the World	Won	
2023	11th Macondo Awards	Best Director	Laura Mora Ortega	Won	
2023	11th Macondo Awards	Best Screenplay	María Camila Arias & Laura Mora Ortega	Nominated	
2023	11th Macondo Awards	Best Cinematography	David Gallego	Won	
2023	11th Macondo Awards	Best Art Direction	Marcela Gómez & Daniel Rincón	Won	
2023	11th Macondo Awards	Best Editing	Sebastián Hernández & Gustavo Vasco	Won	
2023	11th Macondo Awards	Best Sound Design	Michelle Couttolenc, Carlos García & Boris Herrera	Won	
2023	11th Macondo Awards	Best Costume Design	Ana Acosta Ospina	Nominated	
2023	11th Macondo Awards	Best Makeup	Diana Parra	Nominated	

== See also ==
- List of submissions to the 95th Academy Awards for Best International Feature Film
- List of Colombian submissions for the Academy Award for Best International Feature Film
