= Gustavo Angarita =

Colombian actor (1942–2025)

- Born: September 2, 1942; Bogotá, Colombia
- Died: October 16, 2025 (aged 83); Bogotá, Colombia
- Occupation: Actor

Gustavo Antonio Angarita Pantoja (September 2, 1942 – October 16, 2025) was a Colombian film, television and theater actor.

== Life and career ==
Angarita studied at the Bogotá School of Dramatic Arts and then specialized in acting at the International Theatre University in Paris. Returning to Colombia, he joined theater groups, including La Candelaria and the Teatro Popular in Bogotá. He acted in films such as The Strategy of the Snail (1993), Bolívar soy yo (2002) and The 33 (2015). His television appearances include Brigada Central II: La guerra blanca, En los tacones de Eva and Heart's Decree.

Angarita died on October 16, 2025, at the age of 83.

== Partial filmography ==
=== Film roles ===
Year	Title	Role
1985	Time to Die	Juan Sayago
1986	Pisingaña	Meme's Husband
1993	The Strategy of the Snail	Fray Luis
1998	El Día que Murió el Silencio	Oscar
1999	Kalibre 35	Miguel Ángel
2001	La pena máxima	Ramírez
2002	Bolívar soy yo	Psychiatrist
2012	Sofía y el terco	Alfredo
2015	The 33	Mario Gómez
2020	Memories of My Father	Aguirre
2024	Dominique	Abuelo Pedro
