= Bolívar soy yo =

2002 film

Bolívar is me
- Directed by: Jorge Alí Triana
- Written by: Manuel Arias; Alberto Quiroga
- Produced by: Jorge Alí Triana
- Starring: Robinson Díaz; Amparo Grisales
- Release date: 2002
- Running time: 93 minutes
- Countries: Colombia; France
- Language: Spanish

Bolívar Soy Yo is a 2002 Colombian-French film detailing the story of an actor who is known for his interpretation of "El Libertador", Simón Bolívar. The excitement of the role and the admiration of the public are so strong that reality and fiction begin to mix. Finally, reaching the limits of stage-acting, the actor himself believes that he is Bolívar.

== Plot ==
Santiago Miranda (Robinson Díaz) is a famous actor in a popular Colombian soap opera depicting the role of Simón Bolívar, “The Libertador”, a Venezuelan soldier who played a major part in the independence of South America and became their president. He speaks briefly of Don Quixote, an old novel where an old man wants to be a chivalrous knight of old and the local villagers secretly go along with it to humor him. As he stands, giving a motivational and deep speech before he is to be killed off, he exclaims for the director to cut. He declares that he will not have Bolívar die this way. He leaves the set, still wearing the costume, and heads home to his mother.

His co-star and ex-girlfriend, Manuela/Alejandra Baberini (Amparo Grisales), is then sent by the director to rein him in after they speak with his mental health doctors. While she goes to find him, many people are playfully mistaking Santiago as Bolívar. He seems to start believing he is Bolívar as we see his health slowly deteriorate with each fan's reaction to him. When the mental health doctors finally catch him, they have him placed in a ward/clinic with a straight jacket as if he is a danger to himself. When he is let out by Manuela, they go to the beach together and spend alone time finally to themselves. They talk things out, everything is going well until he pretends he has drowned and upsets her by trying to scare her after she runs to check on him.

He later attends what appears to be a publicity stunt, which goes haywire. He loses himself as time progresses, going as far as kidnapping a government official and making demands. He seems to think he can change their world, as Bolívar was supposed to. Having a small binge drinking episode does not help him either. Santiago brings the government official onto a boat, where ‘his’ revolutionaries take over when they do not like a command given by ‘Bolívar’. By this time, Manuela has found him and is also taken captive. She tells him that the director will allow him to rewrite the ending for Bolívar, which he seems to no longer care about.

Manuela even plays along, wanting to reach out to Santiago. However, she starts to believe that he genuinely thinks that he is Bolívar. He asks her, “Do you really believe that I think I’m Bolívar?”. Santiago has written an official declaration for the government official he kidnapped to legalize, had they not been interrupted. It causes confusion of whether or not he really does believe it. Together, Santiago and Manuela plan to rescue the other government officials from the revolutionaries, in which they die from afterwards. Then, at the very last moment, there is clapper board that cuts the scene.

== Cast ==
- Robinson Díaz ... Santiago Miranda / Simón Bolívar
- Amparo Grisales ... Alejandra Barberini / Manuela Sáenz
- Jairo Camargo ... President of Colombia
- Fanny Mikey †... TV Producer
- Gustavo Angarita ... Psychiatrist
- María Eugenia Dávila †... Bolívar's Mother
- Carlos Barbosa ... Minister of Defense
- Alejandra Borrero ... Vice president of Colombia
- Santiago Bejarano ... Novel's Director
- Ana Soler ... Makeup Artist
- Álvaro Rodríguez ... Commander of the Guerrilla E. P. R.
- Vicky Rueda ... Kelly (Prostitute)
- Diego Vélez ... Watchman
- Victoria Valencia ... Tania, Partisan of E. P. R.
- Margarita Ortega ... News Reporter

== Awards ==
Year	Event	Recognition
2002	Festival de cine de Bogotá	Honorable Mention
2002	Festival Internacional de Cine de Mar del Plata	Best Movie
2002	Festival de Cine de Toulouse	Audience's Award
2002	Festival de Cine de Trieste	Best Staging
