= Alias Maria =

2015 film

- Film poster
- Directed by: José Luis Rugeles Gracia
- Written by: Diego Vivanco
- Produced by: Federico Durán
- Starring: Karen Torres; Carlos Clavijo; Erick Ruiz; Anderson Gómez
- Cinematography: Sergio Iván Castaño
- Edited by: Delfina Castagnino
- Music by: Camilo Sanabria
- Release date: 3 April 2015
- Running time: 91 minutes
- Country: Colombia
- Language: Spanish

Alias Maria (Spanish: Alias María) is a 2015 Colombian drama film directed by José Luis Rugeles Gracia. It was screened in the Un Certain Regard section at the 2015 Cannes Film Festival. It received the Golden Goats Award for the Best Feature Movie for the Young People at the 2016 Ale Kino! Festival. It was also selected as the Colombian entry for the Best Foreign Language Film at the 89th Academy Awards but was not nominated.

The 13 year old Maria is a member of a guerrilla unit in Colombia. She is sent for a special mission together with three others to bring the commander's child into safety. Meanwhile, she is pregnant herself.

== Cast ==
- Carlos Clavijo as Mauricio
- Anderson Gomez as Byron
- Carmenza González as Doctor's Wife
- Lola Lagos as Diana
- Julio Pachón as Doctor
- Erik Ruiz as Yuldor
- Karen Torres as Maria
- Fabio Velazco as The Commander

== See also ==
- List of submissions to the 89th Academy Awards for Best Foreign Language Film
- List of Colombian submissions for the Academy Award for Best Foreign Language Film
