= A Male =

- Theatrical release poster
- Directed by: Fabián Hernández Alvarado
- Written by: Fabián Hernández Alvarado
- Produced by: Louise Bellicaud; Claire Charles-Gervais; Christoph Hahnheiser; Josune Hahnheiser; Ilse Hughan; Manuel Ruiz Montealegre
- Starring: Felipe Ramírez Espitia
- Cinematography: Sofia Oggioni
- Edited by: Esteban Muñoz
- Music by: Fabien Kourtzer; Mike Kourtzer
- Production companies: lack Forest Films; Fortuna Films; In Vivo Films; Medio de Contención Producciones; RTVC Play
- Release dates: 24 May 2022 (Cannes); 15 March 2023 (France); 13 April 2023 (Colombia)
- Running time: 81 minutes
- Countries: Colombia; Germany; France; Netherlands
- Language: Spanish

A Male (Spanish: Un varón) is a 2022 drama film written and directed by Fabián Hernández Alvarado in his directorial debut. Starring Felipe Ramírez Espitia. It is about a teenager who will have to face the ferocity of his neighborhood where the codes of masculinity and the law of the strongest is mandatory to survive. It is a co-production between Colombia, Germany, France and the Netherlands.

A Male had its world premiere on May 24, 2022, at Directors' Fortnight at the 75th Cannes Film Festival, where it competed for the Caméra d'Or and the Queer Palm. It was selected as the Colombian entry for the Best International Feature Film at the 96th Academy Awards.

== Synopsis ==
Carlos lives in a boarding school in the center of Bogotá, a kind of refuge where the harshness and troubles of life are mitigated. Carlos longs to spend Christmas with his mother and sister, immersed in circles of urban violence. Upon leaving the boarding school, Carlos confronts the rigor of the streets of his neighborhood, where the law of the strongest, the most masculine prevails. He will have to choose between following these codes of masculinity or trusting his deep nature.

== Cast ==
The actors participating in this film are:

- Felipe Ramírez Espitia as Carlos
- Juanita Carrillo Ortiz as Nicole
- Jhonathan Steven Rodríguez as Freddy

== Production ==
Principal photography began in 2021 for 5 weeks in the Las Cruces, San Bernardo and Santa Fe neighborhoods, as well as Los Mártires with the La Pepita, La Estanzuela and Voto Nacional neighborhoods and in Puente Aranda in the UPI Integral Protection Unit located in Bogotá, Colombia.

== Release ==
=== Festivals ===
A Male had its world premiere on May 24, 2022, at Directors' Fortnight at the 75th Cannes Film Festival, then screened on August 4, 2022, at the 26th Lima Film Festival, on September 22, 2022, at the 70th San Sebastian International Film Festival and on March 24, 2023, at the Cartagena International Film Festival.

=== Theatrical ===
It was released commercially on March 15, 2023, in French theaters and on April 13 of the same year in Colombian theaters.

== Reception ==
=== Critical reception ===
On the review aggregator website Rotten Tomatoes, 86% of 7 critics' reviews are positive, with an average rating of 7.5/10.

=== Accolades ===
Year	Award / Festival	Category	Recipient	Result	Ref.
2022	Cannes Film Festival	Caméra d’Or	A Male	Nominated	
2022	Cannes Film Festival	Queer Palm	A Male	Nominated	
2022	Guanajuato International Film Festival	Best International Feature Film	A Male	Nominated	
2022	Lima Film Festival	Best Picture	A Male	Nominated	
2022	Lima Film Festival	Special Jury Award	A Male	Won	
2022	Lima Film Festival	Best Actor	Felipe Ramírez Espitia	Won	
2022	Lima Film Festival	Competition Fiction - Best Cinematography	Sofía Oggioni Hatt	Won	
2022	Lima Film Festival	International Critics Jury Award for Best Film	A Male	Won	
2022	Nara International Film Festival	Golden Shika Award	A Male	Nominated	
2022	San Sebastian International Film Festival	Horizontes Award	A Male	Nominated	
2022	San Sebastian International Film Festival	Sebastiane Award	A Male	Nominated	
2022	São Paulo International Film Festival	Best Film - Jury Prize	A Male	Nominated	
2022	Paris Gay and Lesbian Film Festival	Libertés Chéries Award	A Male	Won	
2022	International Festival of New Latin American Cinema of Havana	Arrecife Award	A Male	Won	
2022	Pingyao International Film Festival	Jury Special Mention	A Male	Won	
2023	Fribourg International Film Festival	Grand Prix	A Male	Nominated	
2023	Macondo Awards	Best Picture	A Male	Nominated	
2023	Macondo Awards	Best Director	Fabián Hernández Alvarado	Nominated	
2023	Macondo Awards	Best Cinematography	Sofia Oggioni	Nominated	
2023	Macondo Awards	Best Art Direction	Juan Bernal	Nominated	

== See also ==
- List of submissions to the 96th Academy Awards for Best International Feature Film
- List of Colombian submissions for the Academy Award for Best International Feature Film
