= Time Out (1998 film) =

Golpe de Estadio
- Theatrical release poster
- Directed by: Sergio Cabrera
- Screenplay by: Sergio Cabrera; Ben Odell; Others
- Produced by: Maura Vespini; Sandro Silvestri
- Starring: Álvaro Rodríguez; César Mora; Julián Román; Juana Acosta; Nicolás Montero
- Cinematography: Bruno Di Virgilio
- Edited by: Fernando Pardo; Nicholas Wentworth
- Music by: Germán Arrieta; Gonzalo Sagarminaga
- Release date: 25 December 1998
- Running time: 105 minutes
- Country: Colombia
- Language: Spanish

Time Out (Spanish: Golpe de estadio, literally "Stadium Coup") is a 1998 Colombian film directed and co-written by Sergio Cabrera. It is a political satire loosely based in the Christmas truce of World War I, that as of 2016 was the highest-grossing Colombian films of all time.

== Plot ==
The film is a political satire. An oil company locates a camp in a small village in Colombia, named New Texas, in order to do geological research. The village then attracts attacks by guerrillas, who are in constant battle with the local police. However, a kind of truce is called between the two sides while the World Cup qualifying rounds are shown on television, and the match between Colombia and Argentina can only be seen on a single working TV in town. Colombia wins 5–0, and the two opposing sides find that they are cheering for the same team.

== Cast ==
- Emma Suárez - María
- Nicolás Montero - Carlos
- César Mora - Sargento García
- Flavio Caballero - Comandante Felipe
- Humberto Dorado - Padre Bueno
- Raúl J. Sender - José Josu
- Lorena Forteza - Bárbara Berleti
- Andrea Giordana - Klaus Mauser
- Luis Eduardo Arango - Álvarez
- Florina Lemaitre - Lucía
- Mimí Lazo - Samara

== Production ==
The film was an international co-production between Italy, Spain and Colombia. It was co-written by Ben Odell and others.

The title is a play on words: literally translated into English, Golpe de estadio means "stadium coup", while golpe de estado means "coup d’état".

== Accolades ==
Golpe de estadio was Colombia's official Best Foreign Language Film submission at the 72nd Academy Awards, but did not manage to receive a nomination. It was also nominated for the Goya Award for Best Spanish Language Foreign Film in 1999, was Colombia's Academy Awards entry in 2000.

== Box office ==
Golpe de estadio remains one of the highest-grossing Colombian films of all time.

== See also ==
- List of submissions to the 72nd Academy Awards for Best Foreign Language Film
- List of Colombian submissions for the Academy Award for Best Foreign Language Film
