= Ultraviolence (film) =

- Theatrical release poster
- Directed by: Marco Vélez Esquivia
- Written by: Marco Vélez Esquivia
- Produced by: Marco Vélez Esquivia; Oscar Alejandro Zapata
- Starring: Santiago Cottone; Ana Isabel Castillo; Isabela Cordoba Torres; David Moncada; Marcela Robledo; Raúl Ocampo
- Cinematography: Nora Lengua Puche
- Edited by: Lina Ortiz
- Music by: Antonio Espinosa; Luis Mesa
- Production companies: 2/4 Producciones; Imán Music
- Distributed by: Gótico Tropical
- Release dates: October 25, 2022 (Fantasmagoría); May 18, 2023 (Colombia)
- Running time: 95 minutes
- Country: Colombia
- Language: Spanish

Ultraviolence (Spanish: Ultraviolencia) is a 2022 Colombian psychological thriller film written, directed and co-produced by Marco Vélez Esquivia. It is about a film editor who becomes unhealthily obsessed with the film's protagonist to the point of wanting to "save" her by changing the ending of the production. Starring Santiago Cottone, Ana Isabel Castillo, Isabela Cordoba Torres, David Moncada, Marcela Robledo and Raúl Ocampo.

== Synopsis ==
Francisco is a renowned editor in the audiovisual medium, he agrees to work on a new film where he ends up becoming obsessed with the story of the protagonist - who is kidnapped by a man in the basement of her house - and wants to change the ending so that she can be saved from its fateful outcome. As the film's director and producer refuse his changes, Francisco accepts the help of Eva, the post-production assistant, to achieve his goal of preventing Lina's death. However, when they are discovered, Francisco will have to become the villain of his own story.

== Cast ==
The actors participating in this film are:

- Santiago Cottone as Francisco
- Ana Isabel Castillo as Eva
- Isabela Cordoba Torres as Diana
- David Moncada as Federico
- Marcela Robledo as Lina
- Raúl Ocampo as Tomás
- Natalia Castañeda as Natalia
- Camila Vallejo Actriz as Daniela

== Production ==
Principal photography began on May 10, 2021, and ended on May 25 of the same year in Bogotá, Colombia.

== Release ==
Ultraviolence had its world premiere on October 25, 2022, at the Fantasmagoría Fantastic and Horror Film Festival, then was screened at the beginning of February 2023 at the 25th San Francisco Independent Film Festival, in mid-September of the same year at the Cuenca International Film Festival and at the beginning of October of the same year at the 19th Pasto International Film Festival.

It was commercially released on May 18, 2023, in Colombian theaters.

== Accolades ==
Year	Award / Festival	Category	Recipient	Result	Ref.
2023	Pasto International Film Festival	Best Colombian Fiction Screenplay	Marco Vélez Esquivia	Won	
2023	Macondo Awards	Best Supporting Actress	Marcela Robledo	Nominated	
