= The Debt (2014 film) =

- Directed by: Mahmoud Shoolizadeh
- Written by: Mahmoud Shoolizadeh; Richard Levine
- Produced by: Mahmoud Shoolizadeh
- Starring: Courtney Gardner; Chris Morrissey; Kela Holmes; Nicole Gafford Murphy
- Cinematography: Mathew Miller
- Edited by: Mahmoud Shoolizadeh
- Release date: September 2014 (Moondance)
- Running time: 32 minutes
- Country: United States
- Language: English

The Debt is a short film produced and directed by Mahmoud Shoolizadeh, that has participated in several international film festivals and has won two awards. Although the film is based in the city of Jacksonville, Florida, it was filmed in St. Mary's, Georgia, as well as in Jacksonville. Several local newspapers have published articles and discussed this film in detail.

== Plot ==
The short fiction film The Debt, as seen by the official trailer available on YouTube, is about a combat veteran whose life is falling apart unexpectedly faces her past, and it is not what she thought.

"Lisa's family appears normal and happy. Her loving husband dotes on her and their beautiful daughter. But in her heart lies a secret that eats at her soul like a malignant cancer, causing irritability and unpredictable outbursts that make her a stranger in her own home. Shame and guilt from wartime experiences fill every waking and sleeping moment. Desperate, she decides to take an extreme action to escape her past. Instead, she comes face-to-face with a surprising truth."

== Awards and nominations ==
Award for the Best Feature Narrative Film at the 15th Moondance International Film Festival 2014.

- Nominated for Best Directing at the "Universal Film Festival", Kansas City, Missouri, USA, August 2019
- Nominated for Best Drama at the "Universal Film Festival", Kansas City, Missouri, USA, August 2019
- Nominated for Best Film at the "Universal Film Festival", Kansas City, Missouri, USA, August 2019
- Nominated for Best Film at the "Indie Best Film Festival", Santa Monica, California, USA, July 2018
- Award for Best Film at the 15th "Moondance International Film Festival, Sep 2014", Boulder, Colorado, USA
- Award for Best Female Actor at the 15th "Moondance International Film Festival Sep 2014", Boulder, Colorado, USA
- Award for Best 10th Voyage Studios at the "Flagler International Film Festival", Palm Coast, Florida, USA, January 2015
- Award for Best Supporting Actress at the North Carolina "First in Aviation" State's Global Film Festival, January 2015, North Carolina, USA
- Award for Best Child Actor at the North Carolina "First in Aviation" State's Global Film Festival, January 2015, North Carolina, USA
- Nominated for Best Drama at the "Flagler International Film Festival", Palm Coast, Florida, USA, January 2015
- Nominated for Best Film in Florida at the "Flagler International Film Festival", Palm Coast, Florida, USA, January 2015
- Nominated for Best Ensemble Cast at the "Flagler International Film Festival", Palm Coast, Florida, USA, January 2015
