= Petit Mal =

- Promotional release poster
- Directed by: Ruth Caudeli
- Written by: Ruth Caudeli
- Produced by: Ruth Caudeli; Sara Larrota
- Starring: Ruth Caudeli; Silvia Varón; Ana María Otálora
- Cinematography: Andrés Botero
- Edited by: Ruth Caudeli; Silvia Varón
- Production companies: Imán Music; Ovella Blava Films
- Release date: June 9, 2022 (Tribeca)
- Running time: 89 minutes
- Country: Colombia
- Language: Spanish

Petit Mal (French for 'Little Evil') is a 2022 Colombian drama film written, co-produced, co-edited and directed by Ruth Caudeli. It stars Caudeli, Silvia Varón and Ana María Otálora. It is about a polyamorous relationship formed by 3 women who, after the absence of one for work reasons, debate the future of their relationship.

== Synopsis ==
Martina, Laia and Anto are three women who have a polyamorous relationship where the three of them enjoy their meetings in the backyard, their tireless jokes and taking care of the dogs they have rescued. However, their relationship is tested when Laia is called for a long-term project in another city, leaving Martina and Anto vulnerable to face their own dynamics in Laia's absence, forcing them to constantly evolve.

== Cast ==
- Silvia Varón as Martina
- Ruth Caudeli as Laia
- Ana María Otálora as Anto

== Release ==
Petit Mal had its world premiere on June 9, 2022, at the 21st Tribeca Festival, then screened on June 14, 2022, at the 37th Guadalajara International Film Festival, at the end of June 2022 at the 46th Frameline San Francisco International LGBTQ Film Festival, on August 31, 2022, at the Vancouver Latin American Film Festival and on September 24, 2022, at the 33rd Hong Kong Lesbian & Gay Film Festival.

== Reception ==
=== Critical reception ===
On the review aggregator website Rotten Tomatoes, 75% of 12 critics' reviews are positive, with an average rating of 6.8/10.

=== Accolades ===
Year	Award / Festival	Category	Recipient	Result	Ref.
2022	Guadalajara International Film Festival	Maguey Award	Petit Mal	Nominated	
2022	Frameline San Francisco International LGBTQ Film Festival	Jury Prize - Best Film	Petit Mal	Nominated	
2022	San Sebastián International Film Festival	Sebastiane Award	Petit Mal	Nominated	
2023	Macondo Awards	Best Actress	Ana María Otálora	Nominated	
2023	Macondo Awards	Best Supporting Actress	Silvia Varón	Nominated	
