= The Other Shape =

- Theatrical release poster
- Directed by: Diego Felipe Guzmán
- Written by: Diego Felipe Guzmán
- Produced by: Carlos Smith Rovira; Aline Mazzarella; Daniel Velasco; Matherus Pecanha
- Music by: Daniel Velasco
- Production companies: RTVC Play; Hierro Animación; Estúdio GIZ; Dinamita Animación
- Release date: 2022
- Running time: 99 minutes
- Countries: Colombia; Brazil
- Language: Spanish

The Other Shape (Spanish: La otra forma) is a 2022 adult animated science fiction film written and directed by Diego Felipe Guzmán in his directorial debut. It won the award for best animated feature film at the Sitges Film Festival in 2022, and the same year received a nomination for the Contrachamp award at the Annecy International Animation Film Festival and the award for best feature film at the Chilemonos International Animation Festival. According to the newspaper El Colombiano, the film "used the frame-by-frame technique with more than 60,480 drawings or frames to achieve [its] story". It was commercially released on March 30, 2023 in Colombian theaters.

== Overview ==
Humanity creates a square artificial paradise right on the surface of the Moon in the near future. The only way to enter this strange paradise is to demonstrate that one has the mindset of a square, which implies that the inhabitants must close their minds to any kind of questioning. A man who is desperate to fit into this world must decide whether to become this geometric figure, or break the mold by following his own instincts.

== Production and release ==
Around 2018, director Diego Felipe Guzmán began production of the film, which involved obtaining resources from state entities such as RTVC, Idartes and Proimágenes, from international production agreements, and from self-financing and micro-patronage platforms. According to the newspaper El Tiempo, this silent film had a budget of more than half a million dollars and a team of more than one hundred people, who were in charge of producing more than 60,000 frames and 150 animated characters.

The film began its tour of film festivals in 2022, participating in international events like the Sitges Film Festival, the Havana Film Festival, the Electricdreams International Film Festival and the TOHorror Fantastic Film Fest in Italy, the Animac Festival and the International Film Festival Rotterdam, as well as participating in the opening of the Festival de Cine y Artes Audiovisuales Miradas in the city of Medellín. The Other Shape was released in Colombian movie theaters on March 30, 2023.

== Reception ==
=== Critical reception ===
On the Animation for Adults website, the film received a score of nine out of ten points. The site's review states: "The aesthetic display to show us that society is fascinating [...] Just for the visual proposal, which amazes from beginning to end, it deserves to be watched again and again. Fortunately, the aesthetics are accompanied by excellent animation, so it should be remembered as one of the milestones of the Latin American animated scene". Vicky Carras of the Movimentarios website defined it as "a rather curious film, for its original idea and also for managing to entertain without a single word".

=== Accolades ===
Year	Event	Category	Result
2022	Sitges Film Festival	Best animated feature film	Won
2022	Annecy International Animation Film Festival	Contrachamp award	Nominated
2022	Chilemonos International Animation Festival	Best feature film	Won
2023	Quirino Awards	Best Ibero-American Animated Feature Film	Nominated
2023	Macondo Awards	Best Animated Feature	Won
2023	Macondo Awards	Best Original Score	Won
