= Línea de tiempo =

- Theatrical release poster
- Directed by: Yesid Leone
- Written by: Yesid Leone
- Produced by: Lina Gómez
- Starring: María Fernanda Yepes
- Cinematography: Tyron Gallego
- Edited by: Yesid Leone
- Music by: Felipe Di Franco; Julián López
- Production companies: Resplandor Films; Silverwolf Studios
- Release date: April 27, 2023
- Running time: 106 minutes
- Country: Colombia
- Language: Spanish

Línea de tiempo (lit. 'Timeline') is a 2023 Colombian action thriller film written, directed and edited by Yesid Leone. It stars María Fernanda Yepes accompanied by Osvaldo León, Roberto Escobar, Adrián Díaz, Alexander Guzmán and Carlos Congote. It premiered on April 27, 2023, in Colombian theaters.

== Synopsis ==
Joaquín Lara, a successful business man, is going through the best moment of his life. However, while having dinner at a prestigious restaurant in the city, he meets his ex-girlfriend Nina Nadal, who will soon leave the country to rebuild her life abroad. The meeting passes calmly until Joaquín receives a series of mysterious text messages, in which he is required to publish some evidence in that place and thus reveal some dark secrets of certain people present there as well. Otherwise, he is warned that the woman accompanying him “Nina” will be murdered once he leaves the restaurant if he does not comply with the objective. Thus begins a gruesome game in a closed public place where everyone's life is at risk.

== Cast ==
The actors participating in this film are:

- María Fernanda Yepes as Nina Nadal
- Osvaldo León as Joaquin Lara
- Roberto Escobar as Guillermo Polanco
- Alexander Guzmán as Nicolás Crovo
- Carlos Congote as Antonio Aponte
- Ana Soler as Victoria Beltran
- Kevin Medina as Ortega
- Jesús Orlando Cadavid
- Adrián Díaz

== Production ==
Principal photography took place in 2021 in Medellín, Colombia.

== Accolades ==
Year	Award	Category	Recipient	Result	Ref.
2023	11th Macondo Awards	Best Actress	María Fernanda Yepes	Nominated	
2023	11th Macondo Awards	Best Original Score	Felipe Di Franco & Julián López	Nominated	
