= The Debt (1997 film) =

1997 film

- Directed by: Manuel José Álvarez; Nicolás Buenaventura
- Written by: Nicolás Buenaventura
- Starring: Nicolás Buenaventura
- Release date: 14 August 1997
- Running time: 90 minutes
- Country: Colombia
- Language: Spanish

The Debt (Spanish: La deuda), officially called as La deuda (o la insólita muerte y no menos asombrosa resurrección y segunda muerte de Alí Ibrahim María de los Altos Pozos y Resuello, llamado El Turco), is a 1997 Colombian drama film directed by Manuel José Álvarez and Nicolás Buenaventura. The film script was also written by Buenaventura The film was selected as the Colombian entry for the Best Foreign Language Film at the 70th Academy Awards, but was not accepted as a nominee.

== Cast ==
- Nicolás Buenaventura
- Manuel José Álvarez
- Vicky Hernández
- Jairo Camargo
- Humberto Dorado
- Marcela Valencia

== See also ==
- List of submissions to the 70th Academy Awards for Best Foreign Language Film
- List of Colombian submissions for the Academy Award for Best Foreign Language Film
