= Jorge Alí Triana =

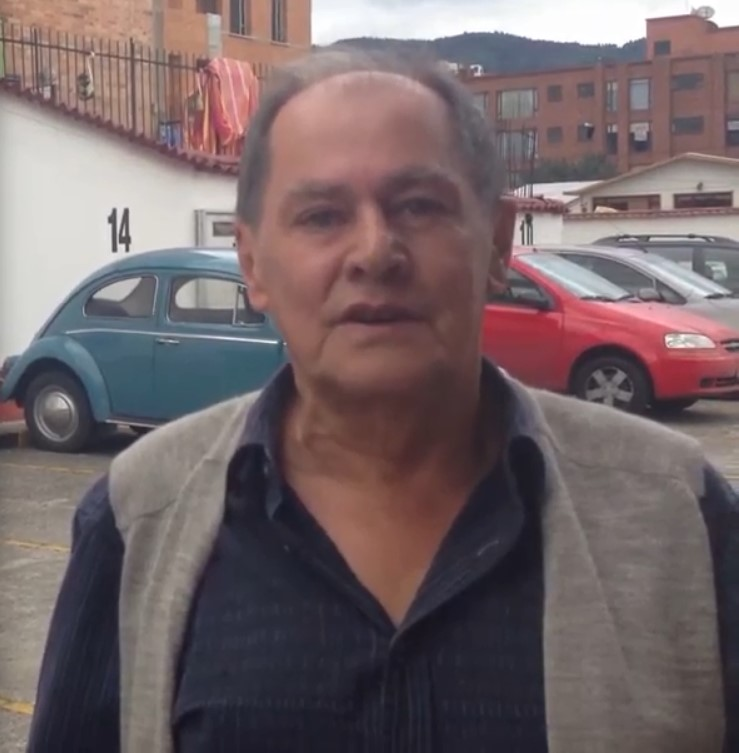
- Jorge Alí Triana
- Born: Jorge Ali Triana Varon; April 4, 1942; Bogotá, Colombia
- Occupations: Theatre director and film director
- Employer: Popular Theater of Bogota

Jorge Ali Triana Varon (born April 4, 1942, in Bogotá, Colombia) is a Colombian theatre director and film director. He studied theater and film in Czechoslovakia and in Berlin. He is one of the founders of the Popular Theater of Bogota in 1967, starting as a theatre director and directing more than 50 works. With the TPB, he won several awards that have established him as one of the most important directors in the country. He has also participated in various theater festivals and has directed TV specials, as well as some series of "Revivamos nuestra historia" ("Relive Our History"). He directed over 30 TV series episodes and several short TV films.

== Filmography ==
=== Films ===
- 1985: Time to Die
- 1996: Oedipus Mayor
- 2002: Bolívar Soy Yo
- 2007: Esto huele mal

=== Television ===
- Las cuatro edades del amor (1980)
- Bolívar, el hombre de las dificultades (1981)
- El cuento del domingo (1980)
- El Cristo de espaldas (1987), TV adaptation of the novel by Eduardo Caballero Calderón
- Los pecados de Inés de Hinojosa (TV series) (1988)
- Castigo Divino (1991), TV adaptation through R.T.I. Colombia Television of the novel Castigo Divino (1988) by Nicaraguan writer Sergio Ramírez
- Maten al león (1991), TV adaptation of the novel by Jorge Ibargüengoitia
- Crónicas de una generación trágica (1993)
- Pecado santo (1995)
- Amar y temer (2009)
- Comando élite, TV series (2013)

== Awards ==
His awards include:

- Award for Best Film "OMBU de oro"
- Award for Best Latin American Film "OMBU de plata", Festival de Mar del Plata, Argentina 2002
- Spectators' Award, Festival de Cine de Toulouse, France 2002
- Award of the Ministry of Culture of Colombia
- Award of Fond Sud Cinema, France

== Personal life ==
He is an atheist.
