= Sergio Cabrera (director) =

Colombian film director (born 1950)

Sergio Cabrera Cárdenas
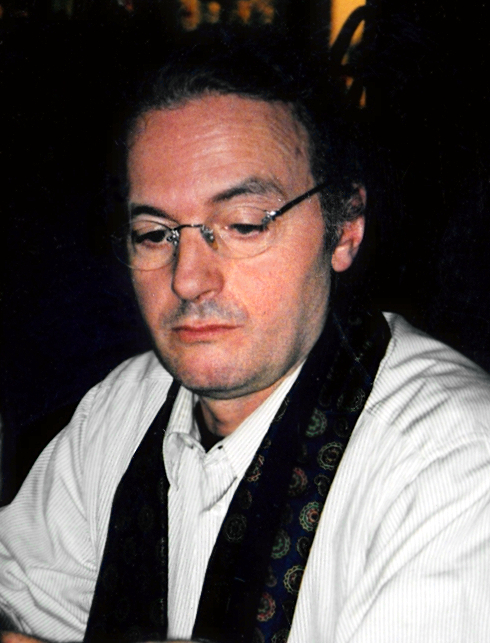
- Born: 20 April 1950 (age 76); Medellín, Colombia
- Occupation: Director
- Years active: 1978–present

Sergio Cabrera Cárdenas (born 20 April 1950) is a Colombian film director. He has directed more than twenty films since 1978. He was the subject of Juan Gabriel Vásquez's novel Retrospective. On August 18, 2022, President Gustavo Petro appointed him Colombia's ambassador to China.

== Selected filmography ==
Year	Title	Role	Notes
1993	The Strategy of the Snail		
1996	Ilona Arrives with the Rain		
1998	Time Out		
2004	Perder es cuestión de método		
