= Francisco Norden =

Colombian film director

- Born: 9 November 1929 (age 96); Brussels, Belgium
- Occupations: Film director Screenwriter
- Years active: 1963-2005

Francisco Norden (born 9 November 1929) is a Colombian film director, screenwriter, editor and producer born in Brussels from an Austrian father and a Colombian mother. He has directed eight films between 1963 and 2005. His film Cóndores no entierran todos los días was screened in the Un Certain Regard section at the 1984 Cannes Film Festival.

== Filmography ==
- Las murallas de Cartagena (1963)
- Se llamaría Colombia (1970)
- Camilo, el cura guerrillero (1974)
- I villagi (1975)
- Congreso mundial de brujería (1975)
- Arte tairona (1977)
- Cóndores no entierran todos los días (1984)
- El trato (2005)
