= Oscar Andrade =

Brazilian politician (1957–2026)

Federal Deputy
- In office 10 January 1996 – 1 February 2003
- Constituency: Rondônia

Personal details
- Born: Oscar Ilton de Andrade; 26 September 1957 Juatuba, Minas Gerais, Brazil
- Died: 18 April 2026 (aged 68) Brasília, Federal District, Brazil
- Party: PSB; PFL; PL
- Occupation: Businessman

Oscar Ilton de Andrade (26 September 1957 – 18 April 2026) was a Brazilian politician. A member of the Liberal Front Party, he served in the Chamber of Deputies from 1996 to 2003.

Andrade died in a motorcycle collision in Brasília on 18 April 2026, at the age of 68.
