= I'm Cris from Tierra Bomba =

- Theatrical release poster
- Directed by: Josephine Landertinger Forero
- Cinematography: Josephine Landertinger Forero
- Music by: Nicolás Muñoz M.
- Production companies: Black Frame Digital; Global Eyes Production; Imán Music
- Distributed by: Casa Kino&Graph
- Release dates: March 25, 2023 (Cartagena); May 25, 2023 (Colombia)
- Running time: 86 minutes
- Country: Colombia
- Language: Spanish

I'm Cris from Tierra Bomba (Spanish: Soy Cris de Tierra Bomba) is a 2023 Colombian documentary film directed by Josephine Landertinger Forero. The film documents 7 years of life of Cristian, a young Afro-Colombian born on the Tierra Bomba Island in Cartagena, Colombia, and his process of self-discovery.

== Synopsis ==
For a period of time, Cristian aimed to be an actor before deciding instead to focus on personal self-discovery. Over seven years, Josephine documented Cristian's process with a camera, examining societal reactions toward those outside perceived norms. Ultimately, Cristian chose to pursue his own path.

== Release ==
=== Festival ===
I'm Cris from Tierra Bomba had its world premiere on March 25, 2023, at the 62nd Cartagena de las Indias International Film Festival, then was screened in July 2023 at the Philadelphia Latino Film Festival.

=== Theatrical ===
It was commercially released on May 25, 2023, in Colombian theaters.

== Accolades ==
Year	Award	Category	Recipient	Result	Ref.
2023	Macondo Awards	Best Visual Effects	Manuel Barrios	Nominated	
