= Pepe Cáceres =

Colombian bullfighter

José Humberto Eslava "Pepe" Cáceres (March 16, 1935 – August 16, 1987) was a Colombian bullfighter.

== Career ==
In his career he had been seriously wounded at least five times yet he could not bring himself to retire. He had remarked in an interview "I think all bullfighters live with the hope of continuing in the bullfighting atmosphere, to prolong the taurine feast". He was seriously injured a sixth time, a goring that he received from the bull "Monín" on July 20, 1987 in Sogamoso, Colombia. He was trapped up against the boards and was mauled by the bull. It resulted in a pierced lung that proved to be fatal. He had been a professional bullfighter for 31 years and had announced his retirement for the next year.
