= Ilona Arrives with the Rain =

1996 film

- Directed by: Sergio Cabrera
- Written by: Álvaro Mutis (novel)
- Cinematography: Giovanni Mammolotti
- Music by: Luis Bacalov
- Release date: 1996
- Countries: Colombia; Spain; Italy

Ilona Arrives with the Rain (Spanish: Ilona llega con la lluvia, Italian: Ilona arriva con la pioggia) is a 1996 Colombian-Spanish-Italian drama film directed by Sergio Cabrera, based on the Álvaro Mutis novel of the same name. It premiered at the 53rd Venice International Film Festival, where it entered the main competition. It was later screened at the Toronto International Film Festival and the Sundance Film Festival.

The soundtrack includes a song of Fabrizio De André, Desmedida plegaria, which is a Spanish version of Smisurata Preghiera from the album Anime Salve.

== Cast ==
- Margarita Rosa de Francisco as Ilona Grabowska
- Imanol Arias as Abdul
- Pastora Vega as Larissa
- Humberto Dorado as Maqroll
- David Riondino as Alex
