= The Strategy of the Snail =

1993 film by Sergio Cabrera

- Directed by: Sergio Cabrera
- Written by: Humberto Dorado; Ramón Jimeno; Sergio Cabrera; Jorge Goldenberg
- Produced by: Sergio Cabrera; Salvo Basile; Sandro Silvestri
- Starring: Carlos Vives; Humberto Dorado; Florina Lemaitre; Fausto Cabrera; Frank Ramírez; Víctor Mallarino
- Production company: Caracol Television
- Release date: 23 December 1993
- Running time: 107 minutes
- Country: Colombia
- Language: Spanish

The Strategy of the Snail (Spanish: La estrategia del caracol) is a 1993 Colombian comedy-drama film written by Humberto Dorado based on a story written by Ramon Jimeno, directed and produced by Colombian filmmaker and director Sergio Cabrera. The film stars Frank Ramírez, Florina Lemaitre, Humberto Dorado, Fausto Cabrera and Carlos Vives. The film is a winner of the Berlin International Film Festival and the Biarritz Film Cinema Festival of Latin America. The film is about a group of tenants of an old house in the center of Bogotá who face an illegal eviction by the owner, an arrogant banker. The tenants are led by an untitled lawyer and a Spanish anarchist exile. The film was selected as the Colombian entry for the Best Foreign Language Film at the 67th Academy Awards, but was not accepted as a nominee.

== Plot ==
The film starts with news reporter Jose Antonio Pupo (played by Carlos Vives) interviewing a man after events have taken place. The man, named Gustavo Calle Isaza 'El Paisa', part of a community of squatters who have taken over a house in Bogotá which was left derelict, reveals to the journalist that when the absentee landlord reappeared, the very house itself was moved to another location by ingenious means. The man's story is interwoven with the depiction of the events.

Six years ago, the building is an old mansion named La Casa Uribe (The Uribe House), it has become home to a diverse community of people. That house had a neighbor called 'La Pajarera' (The Birdhouse). After years of occupation, they are suddenly ordered to leave by the owner, a rich, obnoxious man called Dr. Holguin. The inhabitants of the first building ("The Birdhouse") are confronted by the authorities attempting to perform an eviction, but they lock the doors and shoot at the policemen. After a child is killed by the return fire from the Police they surrender and the eviction is completed.

After this confrontation, the inhabitants of the second house ("Casa Uribe") are next but they're unable to find a new place to live. They are legally represented by 'Perro' Romero (Frank Ramírez), a lawyer even without graduation who only can gain time with legal tricks. Holguin pressures Romero by having him kidnapped and beaten up. Meanwhile, Jacinto (Fausto Cabrera), an intellectual and rebellious Spaniard of Spanish Civil War, devises a way to remove everything inside the house (walls, windows, bathtubs, kitchens, toilets, roofs and so on) and to transport all of it to another location. Being a stagehand, Jacinto shows Romero how it can be done by using a rope and pulley, using the stage of the Colón theater.

Jacinto is able to convince the rest of the inhabitants to help. As the house is being dismantled, Misia Triana (Delfina Guido) accidentally finds the silhouette of the virgin Mary on a wall, which persuades her to help. The squatters are eventually able to remove all the interior of the house, but in order to gain more time, Romero tells Holguin's corrupt lawyer Victor Honorio Mosquera (Humberto Dorado) that the tenants wanted to paint the house before they leave. By the time the lawyers, policemen and Dr. Holguin eagerly approach the house to confirm that the tenants have actually left, they are surprised by a huge explosion and the collapse of the house's facade. After the dust and debris have settled, they find a wall painted with the slogan "Here's your motherfucking painted house." The movie ends by returning to the journalist Jose interviewing Calle Isaza and finally the former inhabitants are shown gathered on a hill with a panoramic view of Bogotá.

== Cast ==
- Carlos Vives - José Antonio Pupo: A journalist who investigates Gustavo Calle's famous snail strategy.
- Frank Ramírez - "Perro" Romero: A lawyer not yet graduated, also a tenant of Casa Uribe who defends the interests of his fellow tenants. Maliciously nicknamed "El Perro" (The Dog) for being attached to the laws.
- Fausto Cabrera - Jacinto Ibarburen: An exiled republican anarchist Spanish who manages the strategy of the snail; bring the house on his back disassembling and taking it to another location.
- Vicky Hernández - Eulalia: A middle-aged woman who lives with her disabled husband Lázaro.
- Ernesto Malbran - Lazaro: The sick and invalid husband of Eulalia.
- Florina Leimatre - Gabriel/Gabriela: A good-hearted transvestite helps the strategy.
- Humberto Dorado - Víctor Honorio Mosquera: Corrupt and naive lawyer of Dr. Holguín
- Victor Mallarino - Dr. Holguín: Arrogant and cocky banker who wants to evict the tenants of the house to make it a national monument when he really does not care about the house.
- Luis Fernando Munera - Gustavo Calle Isaza "el paisa": Smart tenant who has a snake as a pet. Tell the story of the strategy to the journalist Samper at beginning and end of the story.
- Edgardo Roman - judge Díaz: Weak judge who carries out the evictions.
- Sain Castro - Justo: Militant of the left who is not very in agreement with the methods and ideas of Jacinto.
- Delfina Guido - Misia Trina: Religious woman who has lived for 50 years in the house. Although he does not want to leave her, he has a vision of the Virgin Mary and decides to support Jacinto's strategy.
- Salvatore Basile - Matatigres: Holguin's thug.
- Ulises Colmenares - Arquímedes: Cyclist also tenant of the house. Collaborate with the strategy until the end.
- Luis Chiappe- Diogenes: Tenant seller of mirrors and crystals that also helps the strategy.
- Luis Fernando Montoya - Hermes: Tenant young motorcyclist who lives with his wife Gloria at home and collaborates with the strategy.
- Marcela Gallego - Gloria, Hermes' wife.
- Rosa Virginia Bonilla - Dona Concepción: Secretary of court
- Alberto Palacio - Don Mauro; judge's secretary
- Yesid Ferrara - Locksmith
- Clemencia Gregory - Journalist
- Jorge Herrera - Car Washer
- Rodrigo Obregón - Gas station owner

== Themes ==
Having chosen to tell a story about a rich property owner evicting poor squatters, Sergio Cabrera was able to explore the political themes of community belonging and resistance to power. By focusing upon the inhabitants and their teamwork in moving the house and outwitting the owner, the film exposes the corruption of officials such as judges, police, lawyers and politicians in Colombia.

== Production ==
The film was originally envisioned by Ramon Jimeno as an inspiration based on a story he read in a newspaper, about the removal of tenants in a house whose legal procedure had taken such a long time that by the time the authorities had to intervene they realized that the house no longer existed. Although Jimeno had envisioned the movie several years before it was screenwriter and actor Humberto Dorado who finally shaped it into a dense 400 pages screenplay, that eventually became the original screenplay and a blueprint for the film. After the majority of it was filmed, screenwriter Jorge Goldemberg came as an editing consultant and restructured the film, but it was not only until Nobel Prize Gabriel García Márquez saw the pilot of the film and encouraged Sergio Cabrera to continue with the making of the film. Because of budget problems and the lack of support of the Colombian government the film took four years to be fully completed. In fact by the time the Colombian government was actually shutting down the cultural organizations that supported filmmakers such as Focine. The film was shot in Bogotá's downtown with several scenes filmed in the depressed areas of the eastern hills.

== Release ==
The film was released in Colombia on December 23, 1993. The film has won several prizes, it was the winner of the Golden Spike in Valladolid's Film Festival and several others. As of 1994, the film was Colombia’s largest domestic hit. The film was selected as the Colombian entry for the Best Foreign Language Film at the 67th Academy Awards, but was not accepted as a nominee.

== Critical response ==
The film has been praised by critics. The New York Times called the film "a gripping human drama, with ample humor." Variety stated that Cabrera "manages to infuse this complex microcosm of Colombian society with dramatic life".

Looking back in 2015, the Bogotá Post wrote that the film "is considered Cabrera's masterpiece and has become one of the shining examples of Colombian cinema", classing it as a must-see.

== See also ==
- List of submissions to the 67th Academy Awards for Best Foreign Language Film
- List of Colombian submissions for the Academy Award for Best Foreign Language Film
