= La pena máxima (2001 film) =

- Directed by: Jorge Echeverri
- Written by: Dario Armando 'Dago' García
- Screenplay by: Felipe Salamanca
- Based on: Un día de fútbol (A day of soccer) by José Luis Varela
- Produced by: Dago García; Marta Osorio
- Starring: Enrique Carriazo; Sandra Reyes; Robinson Díaz
- Cinematography: Juan Carlos Vásquez
- Music by: Ignacio Rodríguez
- Production companies: Producciones Dago García; Caracol Televisión
- Distributed by: Caracol Televisión
- Release dates: 2001 (Multiplex de Las Américas); 6 June 2001 (Bogotá, Colombia)
- Running time: 89 minutes
- Country: Colombia
- Language: Spanish

La pena máxima (Spanish: Capital Penalty) is a 2001 Colombian comedy (with touches of drama) film directed by Jorge Echeverri starring Enrique Carriazo, Sandra Reyes and Robinson Díaz. The film was based on Un día de fútbol (A day of soccer), a short story by José Luis Varela, and tells the story about a dark man who is a soccer fan who, in his obsession that the Colombian team will win the playoffs against Argentina to enter the World Cup, will commit a chain of mistakes.

== Plot ==
The film begins when Mariano Concha, a public employee, arrives at the El Campín Stadium where his younger brother Saúl is queuing to buy tickets for the soccer game. Between the two they argue about who should buy the tickets.

The narration moves to days before, when in a first match between Colombia and Argentina, the streets of Bogota are empty because people are watching the match. Mariano watches the game on television with Saúl, his mother Rosa, his grandmother, Uncle Pedro (a supporter of Argentina nicknamed by his nephews "The dogs") and Rita, Pedro's wife. Uncle Pedro hates the Colombia team because unlike other teams they have not won major soccer championships and he is even more disappointed when he sees that the Colombians, especially his nephews, celebrate that the match ended in a tie by the national team Colombia. At the same time Luz Dary, Mariano's wife, arrives, who reluctantly leaves accompanied by Rita to buy schnapps at Mariano's request. After the tie celebrated by the residents of the neighborhood, the press interviewed the parents and brother of Jorge Alfredo 'the Beast' Sanabria, neighbors of the protagonists. 'The Beast' Sanabria is a star soccer player for the Colombia team, and therefore, also a neighbor and acquaintance of the protagonists.

While in the rain Saúl stands in line to buy tickets, Mariano has sex with Luz Dary. Later it is revealed that Mariano is also a dreamer in which Luz Dary refutes him not to be aware of the eventual purchase of an apartment for the two of them living close together in the Concha family home. The next day, Mariano and Saúl argue with Uncle Pedro about who will win the rematch match. Mariano bets money, which he does not have, and Mariano, unconsciously and irresponsibly, bets the 6 million pesos saved to buy the apartment for his wife and proposes to his uncle to bet the house, which is actually the grandmother's, against. Saúl is against the bet, because they bet what does not belong to them. Pedro, knowing that Argentina will win, accepts the bet. But he makes a condition; if Argentina wins, Pedro will keep the money but Mariano and Saúl will have to leave the house. Mariano also accepts and offers the opposite, if Colombia wins, Mariano keeps the money, the house and Pedro would be the one who would leave the house. Both seal the bet as gentlemen before the astonished gaze of Saúl and the grandmother.

Mariano and Luz Dary are going to withdraw the money to the bank and decide to celebrate their wedding anniversary at night, although Luz Dary is unaware of her husband's intentions. It is later revealed that Mariano is an obscure bureaucrat who works in a government ministry, but is a rather inept employee with reprimands on his CV. Being sure that the Colombian team will win the match, Mariano also bets the 6 million pesos on his boss Ramírez, having his partner Emilio Gutiérrez as guarantor of the bet with the money temporarily in his account. Ramírez accepts the bet and demands that he stay the night updating some papers or he'll working on Sunday, when Concha had already bought tickets for the game. Mariano reluctantly stays and argues that he gave the money to Don Vicente Sanabria, father of 'The Beast', who would sell them the apartment.

Disappointed that her husband is staying the night working, Luz Dary celebrates her anniversary with Saúl by having a few drinks. Saúl, taking advantage of the drunkenness, seduces her sister-in-law, and they both go to a motel where they try to have sex but Luz Dary stops Saúl at the last moment. Mariano runs away without finishing work and gets home before his wife. Both argue about Mariano's decision not to be with her because he is working and Luz Dary's boredom at her house without being able to go out to have fun.

The next morning, Saúl argues to his brother that he had spoken good things to Luz Dary about her husband. Then they go to church where they ask the priest to make the Colombia team win the match. On Sunday morning, Mariano and Saúl prepare to go to the game but they are surprised that Uncle Pedro is not ready to go. They both go to his bedroom where they try to wake him up and to Mariano's surprise, his uncle Pedro is dead; he died while he slept. Saúl begins to feel guilty since both he and Mariano irritated his uncle who also suffered from heart disease. Pedro suffered with each game, which could hasten his death. Saúl remains undecided about going to the game, but Mariano decides to go no matter what. When Mariano finally convinces Saúl to go to the stadium, Luz Dary discovers that Pedro is dead and alerts Mariano, much to his immediate frustration. The corpse is taken to a small funeral home. Saúl, as a last tribute to his uncle, leaves the radio to his uncle's corpse, according to Saúl, so that his uncle could listen to the game in the Beyond. But still Mariano decides to go at any cost, but several more unfortunate circumstances prevent him from doing so; He must take his grandmother because there is no space in the other cars, when he arrives he tries with Saúl to escape in his car but it breaks down. Saul reveals to Luz Dary Mariano's intentions to go to the stadium to watch the game. Mariano calls his boss Ramírez who refuses to believe that his uncle died and that he is at the funeral home. Ramírez warns him that Argentina is close to scoring a goal and that he is about to win the bet. Mariano and Saul try to flee this time taking her grandmother arguing the old woman's need to go to the bathroom. But when they try to take a taxi to the stadium they fail and instead Uncle Augusto arrives for the funeral, forcing both men to stay. Don Vicente reveals to Luz Dary that Mariano never bought the apartment for him and tells Mariano that although the game is tied, Argentina is close to scoring a goal. Mariano confesses to Luz Dary that he bet the money on the football game, which unleashes the woman's anger. The match ends in a draw 0-0, so the victory must be decided by penalties. Mariano listens to the game by placing his ear on the coffin where the radio is. Colombia finally loses the match 3–4 against Argentina due to a penalty that 'The Beast' Sanabria did not get, which shocks Mariano as he lost the bet and was left in personal bankruptcy.

The angry fans and neighbors of the Sanabria take it out on the footballer's family, calling them all crooks. Later, in the rain, Mariano and Saúl also retaliate and Don Vicente recriminates both of them for his actions, including placing the radio in the coffin.

The next day Mariano discovers that his wife did not sleep at home. He goes to her workplace to beg her forgiveness but Luz Dary decides to separate from Mariano, disappointed in his actions.

At work, Mariano decides to leave in the midst of his sadness, and Ramírez forces Mariano to resign, for not updating the paperwork and not believing him about the death of his uncle. But Mariano decides to sue his boss for unfair dismissal and violation of his labor rights. Upon returning home, Mariano learns from Saúl that the car, despite being French, had a completely broken electrical system and that it was not possible to get spare parts. Upon arriving home, Rosa tells her children that they must leave the house as part of the bet with the late Uncle Pedro in addition to being a promise to a deceased. Decision confirmed by the grandmother in her little lucidity.

Both walk aimlessly and Saúl with his luggage leaves Mariano taking a bus. Saúl wanders through the streets of the city and to the surprise of Mariano, who was crying, Saúl gets him tickets for another soccer game that will be on Sunday. Both simblings hugs ending the film.

== Cast ==
- Enrique Carriazo as Mariano Concha: An inept and obscure employee of a government ministry (possibly the finance minister) obsessed with soccer but who by making fast decisions will end up in personal bankruptcy.
- Robinson Díaz as Saúl Concha: Mariano's younger brother. Young boy also a soccer lover but his role is relegated to being almost a slave to his older brother.
- Sandra Reyes as Luz Dary de Concha: Desperate and bored wife of Mariano. Although she loves her husband, she is bored with the boredom of living with a dreamer who does not deliver what she promises.
- Fernando Arévalo as Uncle Pedro: Middle-aged man married to a young woman and also a soccer lover. Unlike his nephews, he supports the Argentine soccer team and hates the Colombian team. He suffers from the heart and his inadvertent death will ruin Mariano's plans.
- Álvaro Bayona as 'The Fatty' Sanabria: Superb older brother of 'The Beast' Sanabria and occasionally his coach.
- Consuelo Moure as Rosa: Mother of Mariano and Saúl, who does not see any sense in soccer.
- Aura Helena Prada as Rita: Pedro's young wife, worried about his health and fearing that he will have a heart attack from suffering in each soccer game.
- Luis Fernando Munera as Don Vicente Sanabria: 'The Beast' Sanabria's father. In addition to this, he is selling an apartment to Mariano and Luz Dary but ends up selling it to someone else.
- Gustavo Angarita as Ramírez: Dark and old boss of Mariano and Gutiérrez. He hates Mariano for being an inept employee and wishes to fire him. He doubts that the Colombian soccer team will win the match.
- Fernando Solórzano as Emilio Gutiérrez: Companion and (perhaps) only best friend of Mariano.
- Alicia de Rojas as Grandma: Grandmother of Mariano and Saúl, and mother of Pedro. She suffers from senile dementia but has some lucid moments.
- Ana María Arango as Etelvina de Sanabria: 'The Beast' Sanabria's mother.
- John Alex Toro as Guard
- Diedo Vélez as Uncle Augusto
- Iván Rodríguez as Priest
- Diego Vásquez as neighbour and fan
- Juan Carlos Arango as Cab driver
- Marco Antonio López as Don Lucho, little shop owner

== Remake ==
In 2018, a remake of the film released, as a Colombian-Mexican co-production although re-titled La mía, la tuya... te la apuesto ('Mine, yours ... I bet you') to differentiate it from its original version.
