= Alis (film) =

2022 documentary film

- Directed by: Clare Weiskopf; Nicolás van Hemelryck
- Written by: Tatiana Andrade; Anne Fabini; Gustavo Vasco; Clare Weiskopf; Nicolas van Hemelryck
- Produced by: Alexandra Galvis; Radu Stancu; Clare Weiskopf; Nicolás van Hemelryck
- Cinematography: Helkin Rene Diaz
- Edited by: Anne Fabini; Gustavo Vasco
- Production companies: Casatarantula deFilm
- Release date: February 11, 2022 (Berlin)
- Running time: 88 minutes
- Countries: Colombia; Chile; Romania
- Language: Spanish

Alis is a 2022 documentary film, directed by Clare Weiskopf and Nicolás van Hemelryck. A co-production between Colombia, Chile and Romania, the film centres on ten teenage girls at a boarding school in Bogotá. In order to provide a safe and supportive entry point to the painful truths of each girl's experience, the filmmakers frame the story through asking each girl to imagine that they have a new classmate named Alis, and to describe both her and their own relationship with her.

The film premiered in February 2022 at the 72nd Berlin International Film Festival, where it was the winner of both the Crystal Bear for best film in the Generation 14+ program and the Teddy Award for best LGBTQ-related documentary film.

At the 11th Macondo Awards in 2023, the film won the award for Best Documentary, and the filmmaking team were nominated for Best Screenplay.
