= Gustavo Nieto Roa =

Colombian film director

- Born: 3 April 1942 (age 84); Tunja, Boyacá, Colombia
- Occupations: Film director, producer, screenwriter
- Years active: 1973-present

Gustavo Nieto Roa (born 3 April 1942) is a Colombian film director, producer and screenwriter. He has directed eleven films since 1973.

== Selected filmography ==
- The Latin Immigrant (1980)
- Caín (1984)
