= Vicky Hernández =

Colombian actress

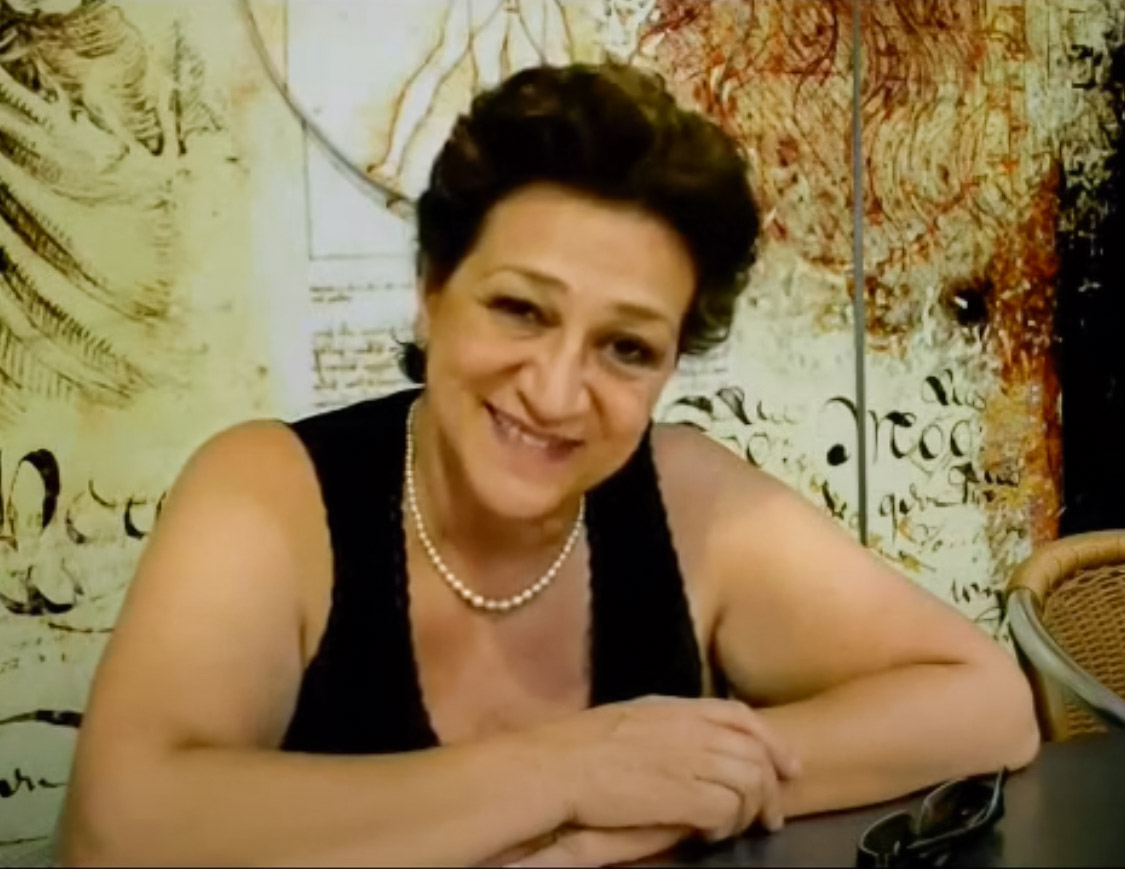
- Vicky Hernández (2011)
- Born: Victoria Hernández Salcedo; October 14, 1945 (age 80); Tuluá
- Occupation: actor
- Years active: 1951–present
- Known for: Proof of Life
- Notable work: Confessing to Laura
- Spouse: Germán Calero (Div.)

Vicky Hernández is a Colombian movie, theater and TV actress born in Tuluá.

== Work ==
=== Film ===
- 2016 Between Sea and Land
- 2005 Les Gens Honnêtes Vivent en France (Soeur Suzanna)
- 2004 Perder es Cuestión de Método, de Sergio Cabrera
- 2004 El Cristo de Plata
- 2000 Proof of Life, de Taylor Hackford - prod. estadounidense (María)
- 1999 La Toma de la Embajada, de Ciro Durán (María Elena Chassoul)
- 1997 La Deuda, de Manuel José Álvarez y Nicolás Buenaventura
- Paradiso del Trópico, de Cristián Norbert y Françoise Bricaut - prod. francesa
- 1994 Águilas no Cazan Moscas, de Sergio Cabrera (Encarnación)
- 1993 La Estrategia del Caracol, de Sergio Cabrera (Doña Eulalia)
- 1990 Confesión a Laura, de Jaime Osorio Gómez (Laura)
- 1988 Técnicas de Duelo, de Sergio Cabrera (Encarnación)
- 1987 Chronicle of a Death Foretold (Crónica de una Muerte Anunciada), de Francesco Rosi (Clotilde Armenta)
- 1986 Visa U.S.A., de Lisandro Duque (madre de Patricia)
- 1986 La Mansión de Araucaima, de Carlos Mayolo (La Machiche)
- 1985 Póngale Color, de Camila Loboguerrero - mediometraje
- 1984 Cóndores no Entierran Todos los Días, de Francisco Norden (Agripina)
- 1984 Caín, de Gustavo Nieto Roa
- 1984 Nelly, de Teresa Saldarriaga - mediometraje
- 1983 Carne de tu Carne, de Carlos Mayolo
- 1982 Le Sang des Tropiques, de Cristhian Bricault - prod. francesa
- 1981 Las Cuatro Edades del Amor, de Mario Mitrotti
- 1980 Caperucita Roja, de Humberto Coral - mediometraje

=== Theater ===
- Águilas no cazan moscas (1994) .... Encarnación
- La casita del placer (1994 - teatro)
- Estrategia del caracol, La (1993) .... Doña Eulalia, the pious murderess
- La muerte y la doncella (1992 - teatro)
- Prisioneros del amor
- La muerte y la doncella, teatro dirigido por Fanny Mikey
- "Hilos invisibles"
- Confesión a Laura (1991) .... Laura
- Cartas de amor (1991 - teatro)
- "Azúcar" (1989) TV Series .... Raquel Vallecilla
- "Romeo y Buseta" (Seriado) .... doña Amparo Tuta
- Técnicas de duelo: Una cuestión de honor (1988) .... Encarnación
- Matter of Honour, A (1988) (UK)
- Hay que deshacer la casa (1987 - teatro)
- Mansión de Araucaima, La (1986) .... La Machiche
- Debajo de las estrellas (mediometraje) (1986)

+Visa USA (1986) .... Patricia's mother

- Póngale color (1985)
- Cóndores no entierran todos los días (1984) .... Agripina
- Nelly (1984)
- Carne de tu carne (1983)
- Sang des tropiques, Le (1982)
- I took Panama (1980 - teatro)
- El resistible ascenso de Arturo Ui (1979 - teatro)
- Ricardo III (1978 - teatro)
- Rubí (1970)
- Soldados (1966 - teatro)
- Variaciones sobre un tema de Kafka (1966 - teatro)
- La gaviota (1966 - teatro)
- Cascabel
- Proof of life
- Las cuatro edades del amor
- Espumas (1991)
- Casa Brava
- Reina de belleza
- El Faraón
- Don Chinche (seriado)
- "La intrusa" .... La Mona Nancy (premio India Catalina)
- Los colores de la fama
- "Inseparables"
- "La casa de las dos palmas" (premio India Catalina y Simón Bolívar) * (1991)
- "Pasiones secretas"
- Cuentos y leyendas
- Dialogando
- El coleccionista
- Un travía llamado deseo
- Los siete pecados capitales
- Casa de muñecas
- Marat Sade
- El burgues geltilhombre
- Telediacto
- Historia de los grandes hombres
- Retablo de la avaricia, la lujuria y la muerte
- El mundo del niño
- Abrete sésamo
- Música para niño

=== Television ===
- Sin senos sí hay paraíso (2016 - )
- Hasta que la plata nos separe (2006-2007)
- Juan Sin Miedo
- Las noches luciana
- Siete Veces amada
- La Casa de las Dos Palmas
- El Fiscal
- Azucar (1989)
- Pandillas: Guerra y Paz
- En los Tacones de Eva
- Hasta que la Plata nos Separe
- Aqui no hay quien viva (2008)
- Tiempo Final (2007, Fox TeleColombia)
- Madre.La (1998)
- Momposina (1995)
- Sobrevivir (1995)
