= 6th Macondo Awards =

Honored best audiovisual productions

- Date: December 14, 2017
- Site: Faenza Theatre; Bogotá, Colombia

Highlights
- Best Film: Guilty Men
- Most awards: Guilty Men (9)
- Most nominations: Guilty Men (9)

Television coverage
- Network: Señal Colombia

The 6th Macondo Awards ceremony, presented by the Colombian Academy of Cinematography Arts and Sciences, honored the best audiovisual productions of 2017. It took place on December 12, 2017, at the Faenza Theatre in Bogotá. The ceremony awarded 16 categories and was broadcast by Señal Colombia.

The film Guilty Men won the award for Best Film.

== Winners and nominees ==
Best Picture: Guilty Men; The Nobodies; Oscuro Animal; X500	Best Director: Iván Gaona – Guilty Men; Juan Sebastián Mesa – The Nobodies; Carlos Osuna – With the Lips Closed; Juan Andrés Arango – X500
Best Actor: Bernardo Garnica – X500; Manuel Sarmiento – Destinos; Luis Fernando Hoyos – El caso Watson; Alejandro Aguilar – Empeliculados	Best Actress: Luisa Vides – Oscuro Animal; Verónica Orozco – El caso Watson; Ángelica Blandón – Fragments of Love; María Angélica Puerta – The Nobodies
Best Supporting Actor: Álvaro Bayona – With the Lips Closed; Diego Ramírez Hoyos – Destinos; Carlos Hurtado – El caso Watson; Manuel José Chávez – The Firefly	Best Supporting Actress: Marcela Benjumea – With the Lips Closed; Jennifer Arenas – Destinos; Verónica Carvajal – Oscuro Animal; Marcela Valencia – Pasos de héroe
Best Screenplay: Iván Gaona – Guilty Men; Juan Sebastián Mesa – The Nobodies; Carlos Osuna, Juan Mauricio Ruiz – With the Lips Closed; Juan Andrés Arango – X500	Best Cinematography: Juan Camilo Paredes – Guilty Men; Eduardo Ramírez – Destinos; Andrés Gutiérrez – Huellas; Nicolás Canniccioni – X500
Best Editing: Andrés Porras – Guilty Men; Eliane Katz – Oscuro Animal; Isabel Otálvaro – The Nobodies; Felipe Guerrero – X500	Best Art Direction: Juan David Bernal – Guilty Men; Carmen Gómez – Keyla; Marcela Gómez – Oscuro Animal; Juan David Bernal – With the Lips Closed
Best Sound Design: José Jarro Flores, Daniel Garcés – Guilty Men; Miller Castro, Daniel Vásquez – Eso que llaman amor; Alejandra Escobar, Daniel Vásquez – The Nobodies; César Salazar, Roberta Ainstein – Oscuro Animal	Best Costume Design: Camilo Barreto – Guilty Men; Carolina Serna – Pasos de héroe; Diana Oliva Basante – With the Lips Closed; Camilo Barreto, Erika Dergal, Marylin Garceau – X500
Best Makeup: Sofía Ferreira, Jessica Suárez – With the Lips Closed; Ernestina Arévalo – El caso Watson; Michelle Cervera – Un caballo llamado Elefante; Lina Cadavid, Priscila de Villalobos, Pamela Wardem – X500	Best Original Score: Edson Velandia – Guilty Men; Gustavo Parra – Chamán: el Último Guerrero; Daniel Velasco – Keyla; Camilo Sanabria – Un caballo llamado Elefante
Best Documentary: Nicolás Rincón Gille – Noche herida; Claudia Fischer – Ati y Mindhiva; Josephine Landertinger Forero – Home: The Country of Illusion; Catalina Mesa – Jerico, the Infinite Flight of Days	Best Short: Klych López – 7Un3L; Andrés Ramírez Pulido – El edén; Andrés Porras, Jesus Reyes – Genaro; Simón Mesa Soto – Madre

== See also ==
- List of Colombian films
- Macondo Awards
- 2017 in film
