= 8th Macondo Awards =

- Date: November 9, 2019
- Site: Plaza Mayor; Medellín, Colombia

Highlights
- Best Film: Birds of Passage
- Most awards: Birds of Passage (9)
- Most nominations: Birds of Passage (13)

The 8th Macondo Awards ceremony, presented by the Colombian Academy of Cinematography Arts and Sciences, honored the best audiovisual productions of 2019. It took place on November 9, 2019, at the Plaza Mayor convention and exhibition center in Medellín. The ceremony awarded 18 categories.

The film Birds of Passage won the award for Best Film.

== Winners and nominees ==
Best Picture: Birds of Passage; Candelaria; We Are the Heat	Best Director: Ciro Guerra, Cristina Gallego – Birds of Passage; Vladimir Durán – So Long Enthusiasm; Daniela Castro Valencia, Nicolas Ordóñez – La mujer de los 7 nombres
Best Actor: Alden Knight – Candelaria; José Acosta – Birds of Passage; Manuel Álvarez – El Piedra	Best Actress: Carmiña Martínez – Birds of Passage; Verónica Lynn – Candelaria; Silvia Varón Santamaría – Eva and Candela
Best Supporting Actor: Jhon Narváez – Birds of Passage; Greider Meza – Birds of Passage; Vladimir Durán – So Long Enthusiasm	Best Supporting Actress: Natalia Reyes – Birds of Passage; Victoria Hernández – El silencio del río; Loren Paz Jara – Wandering Girl
Best Screenplay: Maria Camila Arias, Jhonny Hendrix Hinestroza, Abel Arcos, Carlos Quintela – Candelaria; Maria Camila Arias, Jacques Toulemonde – Birds of Passage	Best Cinematography: David Gallego – Birds of Passage; Luis Otero Prada – We Are the Heat; Felipe Aguilar Levy, Helkin Rene Diaz – Ganges; Mauricio Vidal, Nicolas Ordóñez – La mujer de los 7 nombres
Best Editing: Felipe Guerrero – Ruben Blades Is Not My Name; Miguel Schverdfinger – Birds of Passage; Juan Soto – En el taller	Best Art Direction: Angélica Perea – Birds of Passage; Jaime Luna – We Are the Heat; Óscar Navarro – Wandering Girl
Best Sound Design: Marco Salaverría, Claus Lynge, Carlos García – Birds of Passage; José Jairo Flores, Sebastián Alzate, Daniel Vásquez – The Smiling Lombana; Raúl Locatelli, Oliever Guillaume, Nicolás Naegelen, Daniel Vásquez – El silencio del río	Best Costume Design: Catherine Rodríguez – Birds of Passage; Luz Helena Cárdenas – We Are the Heat; Susana Jaramillo – Eva and Candela
Best Original Score: Camilo Sanabria – The Smiling Lombana; Juan Carlos Pellegrino – El Piedra; Alejandro Ramirez-Rojas – El sendero de la anaconda	Best Original Song: Rocca, Junior Jein – "Ganar y sumar" from We Are the Heat; Juan Carlos Pellegrino – "El piedra hop" from El Piedra; Los Neuronas – "In & out" from Entre nosotros
Best Visual Effects: Paula Núñez – We Are the Heat; Pigmalion Animation Studio, Océano Post Digital, Catapulta Producciones – Alma de héroe; Vanessa Suárez – La medium del venerable	Best Documentary: Daniela Abad – The Smiling Lombana; Guillermo Quintero – Homo Botanicus; Daniela Castro Valencia, Nicolas Ordóñez – La mujer de los 7 nombres
Best Short Film: Juan Pablo Caballero – La virgen negra; Eugenio Gómez Borrero – María de los esteros; Juan Sebastián Mesa – Tierra mojada	Best Ibero-American Film: Alfonso Cuarón – Roma (Mexico); Gustavo Rondón Córdova – The Family (Venezuela); Marcelo Martinessi – The Heiresses (Paraguay)

== See also ==
- List of Colombian films
- Macondo Awards
- 2019 in film
