= Patricia Castañeda =

Colombian Actor, Director, Writer

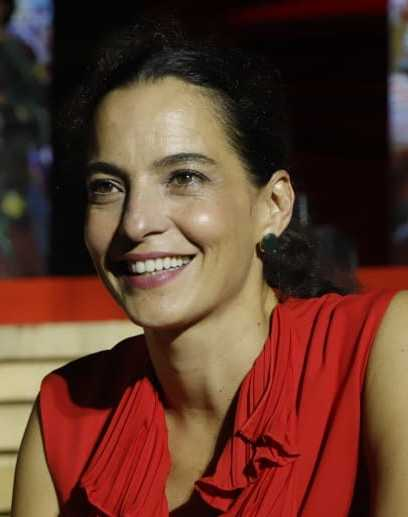
- Born: Patricia Castaneda; February 16, 1972 (age 54); Cali, Colombia
- Occupations: Actor, Writer, Director

Patricia Castañeda (born February 16, 1972) is a Colombian actor, director, and writer. She is the recipient of numerous accolades, including an India Catalina Award for Best Leading Female Actor at the Cartagena Film Festival.

== Biography ==
Born in Cali, Colombia, she began her acting career in the early 1990s in the Colombian kids show La Brújula Mágica. After that, she landed the lead character in the TV series Tiempos Dificiles and was nominated for best actress in the Cartagena Film Festival (Festival de Cine de Cartagena). She then moved to New York City and studied acting at HB Studio for three years while she took creative writing courses with Robert Auleta at the School of Visual Arts.

Caracol TV called her back to join the cast of the comedy Pecados Capitales. She then received the lead role in La Saga, La Tormenta and her first film, Otros, directed by Oscar Campo. In 2006, she was cast as Valeria, a small role in the movie Satanas directed by Andi Baiz; the reporter in the short film "Ciudad Cronica", which won at the Bogotá Film Festival; and Grand Lady in the film Love in the Time of Cholera directed by Mike Newell. In 2004 she became one of the first celebrities to take part in a reality show, Desafio 2004.

In 2009 she was cast in the comedy show Caméra Café and in 2010 she joined the TV series Los Caballeros las Prefieren Brutas, the first original series made by Sony Entertainment Television, playing the role of Hannah de la Aspriella. She landed the lead role in the Norwegian film Handle with Care, directed by Adril Andresen. In 2015 she had a supporting role in the film Moria, directed by Claudio Catao, and was nominated for best supporting actress by the Academia Colombiana de Cine in the Macondo Awards. She also performed in the series La Ley del Corazon and Nadie me Quita lo Bailao and the film Pacifico. In 2018 she landed the leading role in the series Debora, la Mujer que Desnudo a Colombia.

Castañeda started writing for SoHo magazine in 2004 and has her own column: "El Closet". In 2005 she wrote her first book, Manual para Salir de la Tusa (Guide to Get Over Heartbreaks). The newspaper El País published her short story "El Palo de Golf", which later appeared in a series of ten short stories, La noche del Demonio (The Night of the Demon), published in 2007 by Villegas Editores. For a year and a half she wrote a column in la Revista Cromos magazine: Profundamente light. In 2010 Castañeda wrote the screenplay for Roa, a film directed by Andres Baiz. She wrote and directed two short stories as "El Secreto", which was an official selection at the Festival de Cine de Cali and Colombian Film Festival NYC.

Castañeda wrote, directed and produced the feature film Dear Gentlemen which won ten awards at the 2025 Macondo Awards. It is based on the life of the late Colombian suffragist Esmeralda Arboleda Cadavid, starring Julieth Restrepo.

== Publications ==
In December 2010, Castañeda published her first novel, Virginia Casta, with Villegas Editores. The novel was made into a film by actor/director Claudio Cataño.

== Filmography ==
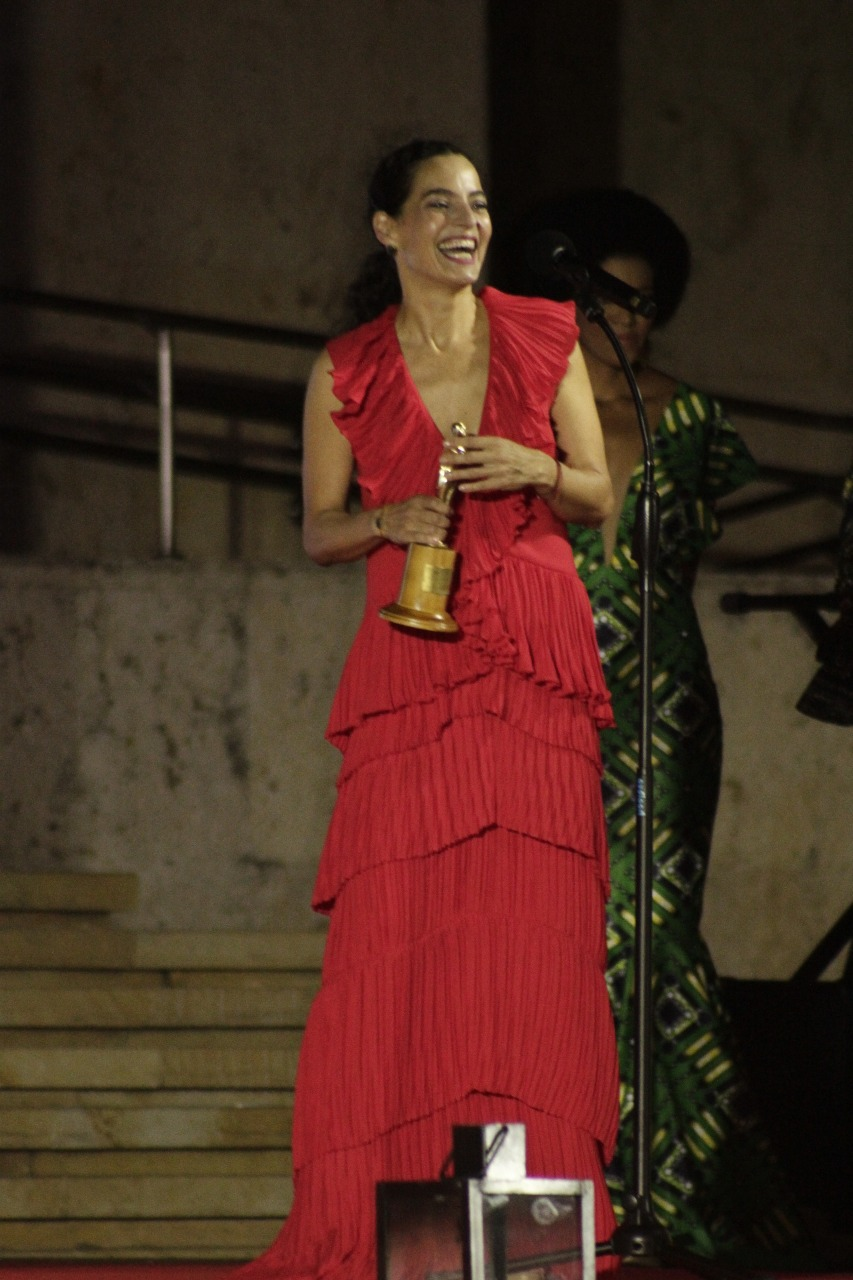
India Catalina Best Leading Actress

=== Television ===
- Tiempos Dificiles (1996)
- Pecados Capitales (2002)
- La Saga (2004)
- La Tormenta (2006)
- Vuelo 1503 (2007)
- Camara Cafe (2008)
- Los Caballeros las Prefieren Brutas
- La Ley del Corazon (2015)
- El Laberinto de Alicia (2016)
- Nadie me Quita lo Bailao (2016)
- Debora, la Mujer que Desnudo a Colombia (2018)

=== Films ===
- Satanas (2006)
- Love in the Time of Cholera (2006)
- Passing By (2008)
- Yo soy Otro (2008)
- La vida Era en Serio (2009)
- Moria (2015)
- Pacifico (2016)
- Handle with Care (2017)
- Virginia Casta (2017)
