= 13th Macondo Awards =

- Date: November 2, 2025
- Site: Medellín Metropolitan Theatre; Medellín, Colombia
- Hosted by: Christian Tappan; Carolina Gómez; Paola Turbay

Highlights
- Best Film: Estimados señores
- Most awards: Estimados señores (9)
- Most nominations: Estimados señores (12)

Television coverage
- Network: TNT, HBO Max, Telemedellín, Canal TRO

The 13th Macondo Awards ceremony, presented by the Colombian Academy of Cinematography Arts and Sciences, honored the best audiovisual productions of 2025. It took place on November 2, 2025, at the Medellín Metropolitan Theatre in Medellín.

== Winners and nominees ==
Best Picture: Estimados señores; Malta; Between Sea and Land; Uno, entre el oro y la muerte	Best Director: Patricia Castañeda – Estimados señores; Natalia Santa – Malta; Camila Beltrán – Mi bestia; Jorge Forero – Matrioshka
Best Actor: Manolo Cruz Urrego – Between Sea and Land; Juan Pablo Barragán – La sombra del juez; Juan Pablo Urrego – Uno, entre el oro y la muerte; Jairo Camargo – Asalto al mayor	Best Actress: Vicky Hernández – Between Sea and Land; Julieth Restrepo – Estimados señores; Marcela Mar – Uno, entre el oro y la muerte; Estefanía Piñeres – Malta
Best Supporting Actor: Emmanuel Restrepo – Malta; Claudio Cataño – Estimados señores; Hernán Cabiativa – Entrevista laboral; Jorge Cao – Between Sea and Land	Best Supporting Actress: Paula Castaño – Estimados señores; Bárbara Perea – Estimados señores; Juana Arboleda – La niña y el cazador; Patricia Tamayo – Malta
Best Screenplay: Patricia Castañeda – Estimados señores; Natalia Santa – Malta; Jorge Forero, Tatiana Andrade – Matrioshka; Camila Beltrán, Silvina Schnicer – Mi bestia	Best Cinematography: Sergio García Moreno – Estimados señores; Lola Gómez – Matrioshka; Mauricio Vidal – La salsa vive; Luciana Riso – La piel en primavera
Best Editing: María Clara Guzmán – La salsa vive; Carlos Cordero, Rafael Loayza, Frank Benítez – El pantera; María Alejandra Briganti, Carlos Cordero – Nosotras; Nicolás Herrán – Choibá: la danza de la ballena yubarta	Best Art Direction: Diana Trujillo, Victoria Giordanelli – Estimados señores; Marcela Gómez – La piel en primavera; Juan Manuel Garcés, Sofía Guzmán – Mi bestia; Lili Cabrejo – Matrioshka
Best Sound Design: César Salazar, Felipe Rayo, Charles Brownley, Enrique Larreal, Carlos Segovia – La salsa vive; Sebastián Alzate López, Mathew Waters, Daniel Vásquez, Alejandro Escobar – Uno, entre el oro y la muerte; Juanma López, Daniel Giraldo, Daniel Vásquez – Positivo negativo; Germán Daniel León – Between Sea and Land	Best Costume Design: Carmen Latorre – Estimados señores; Luz Helena Cárdenas – Mi bestia; Julian Grijalba – Malta; Juliana Hoyos – La piel en primavera
Best Makeup: Yenny Zuluaga – Estimados señores; Lina Cadavid – Mi bestia; Manuela Muñoz – Uno, entre el oro y la muerte; Gabriela Iglesias – Colibrí	Best Original Score: María Linares – Matrioshka; Felipe Téllez – Estimados señores; Daniel Carvajalino – Agua salá; Camilo Sanabria – La sombra del juez
Best Original Song: Gustavo García – "Son Catalina" from El pantera; Andrés Soto, María Linares – "Colibrí" from Colibrí; Andrés Martínez – "Who Will Interview You?" from Entrevista laboral; Isabel Ramírez Ocampo – "Igualada" from Igualada	Best Visual Effects: Roberto Montoya – La niña y el cazador; Andrés Valencia – En lo profundo; Luis Agamez – La sombra del juez; Fausto Miguel Díaz Pasmiño – Lo peor hasta el momento
Best Documentary: La salsa vive – Juan Carvajal; El pantera – David Martín Porras; Soul of the Desert – Mónica Taboada Tapia; Choibá: la danza de la ballena yubarta – José Nicolás Alzate	Best Ibero-American Picture: Walter Salles – I'm Still Here (Brazil); Nelson Carlo de los Santos Arias – Pepe (Dominican Republic); Tatiana Huezo – The Echo (Mexico); Marcel Barrena – The 47 (Spain)
Best Short Film: Camilo Escobar Henao – Un día de mayo; Edward Gómez Granada – Malicia; Nelson Navarrete, Alex Ulises – NEA; Leinad Pájaro De la Hoz – Un pájaro voló	Best Animated Short Film: Pedro Nel Cabrera Vanegas – Tapir Memories; Andrés Pérez – Ocaso; Andrea Muñoz – Cuerpo de esta sombra; Issabella Rozo González – Quebranto
Best Documentary Short Film: Angélica María Torres – Pirsas; Santiago Rodríguez – Estamos en el mapa; Sebastián Duque – Tierra encima; Monica Taboada Tapia – Bandera roja	Audience Award – Best Film: Uno, entre el oro y la muerte

== See also ==
- List of Colombian films
- Macondo Awards
- 2025 in film
