= Colombia's Next Top Model season 1 =

Colombia's Next Top Model
- Season 1
- Judges: Carolina Guerra; Catalina Aristizábal; Raúl Higuera; Kika Rocha
- No. of contestants: 15
- Winner: Mónica Castaño
- No. of episodes: 19

Release
- Original network: Caracol TV
- Original release: 8 January – 1 February 2013

Season chronology
- Next → Season 2

Colombia's Next Top Model, Cycle 1 was the first cycle of Colombia's Next Top Model.

The cycle featured fifteen contestants and was hosted by Carolina Guerra. Episodes aired daily, unlike with most version of the Top Model franchise, where episodes air weekly. The prizes for this season included $50,000 in cash, a brand-new automobile, a cover of Cromos magazine, and a contract with Chica Águila.

The winner of the competition was 23-year-old Mónica Castaño.

== Contestants ==
(ages stated are at start of contest)

Contestant	Age	Hometown	Finish	Place
Eliana Colorado	24	Medellín	Episode 2	15
Maria Conchita 'Conchita' Buendia	23	Cúcuta	Episode 4	14
Viviana Salinas Coy	24	Bogotá	Episode 6	13
Daniela 'Dani' Estrada	21	Medellín	Episode 8	12
Maribel 'Mary' Montaño Quintero	21	Cali	Episode 10	11
Daniela Raad	24	Ocaña	Episode 12	10
Karin de la Hoz Kipke	24	Cartagena	Episode 14	9
Martha Medina Garcia	22	Montería	Episode 19	8–5
Julieth Roldán	23	Medellín	Episode 19	8–5
Cristina 'Cristy' Garcés	20	Medellín	Episode 19	8–5
Carolina Arango Zapata	23	Buga	Episode 19	8–5
Liseth 'Lis' Henao	22	Medellín	Episode 19	4–2
Claudia Castro	21	Cali	Episode 19	4–2
Anggie Ann Bryan	23	San Andrés	Episode 19	4–2
Mónica Castaño	23	Palmira	Episode 19	1

== Episodes ==
=== Episode 1 ===
First aired January 8, 2013

Black dress challenge groups
Group	Contestants
One	Claudia, Mary, Natalia & Tatiana
Two	Anggie, Mónica, Naty & Viviana
Three	Conchita, Lis, Julieth, Lis & Martha
Four	Dani, Eliana, Karin & Keidy
Five	Carolina, Cristy, Daniela & Juliana

- First call-out: Daniela Raad
- Bottom six: Claudia Castro, Juliana Vega, Keidy Johanna Garcés, Natalia Ospina, Naty Sánchez & Tatiana García
- Eliminated: Juliana Vega, Keidy Johanna Garcés, Natalia Ospina, Naty Sánchez & Tatiana García
- Featured photographer: Raúl Higuera
- Featured director: Juan Camilo Pinzon

=== Episode 2 ===
First aired January 9, 2013

- Immune: Mónica Castaño
- First call-out: Anggie Ann Bryan
- Bottom two: Eliana Colorado & Mary Montaño
- Eliminated: Eliana Colorado
- Featured photographers: Camilo George, Sebastian Quintero

=== Episode 3 ===
First aired January 10, 2013

Photo shoot pairs
Pairs
Anggie & Conchita
Carolina & Martha
Claudia & Karin
Cristy & Viviana
Dani & Mónica
Daniela & Mary
Julieth & Lis

- Immunity winner: Mónica Castaño
- Featured photographer: Hernan Fuentes

=== Episode 4 ===
First aired January 11, 2013

- Immune: Mónica Castaño
- First call-out: Julieth Roldan
- Bottom two: Conchita Buendía & Dani Estrada
- Eliminated: Conchita Buendía
- Featured photographer: Mauro Gonzalez

=== Episode 5 ===
First aired January 14, 2013

- Immunity winner: Carolina Arango

=== Episode 6 ===
First aired January 15, 2013

- Immune: Carolina Arango
- First call-out: Karin Kipke
- Bottom two: Anggie Ann Bryan & Viviana Salinas
- Eliminated: Viviana Salinas

=== Episode 7 ===
First aired January 16, 2013

- Immunity winner: Karin Kipke

=== Episode 8 ===
First aired January 17, 2013

- Immune: Karin Kipke
- First call-out: Martha Medina
- Bottom two: Anggie Ann Bryan & Dani Estrada
- Eliminated: Dani Estrada

=== Episode 9 ===
First aired January 18, 2013

Photo Shoot Pairs
Pairs
Anggie & Carolina
Claudia & Martha
Cristy & Lis^{1}
Cristy & Mary^{1}
Daniela & Karin
Julieth & Mónica

- ^Note 1 Since there was an odd number of girls, Cristy was paired with two girls: Lis and Mary
- Immunity winner: Martha Medina

=== Episode 10 ===
First aired January 21, 2013

- Immune: Martha Medina
- First call-out: Mónica Castaño
- Bottom two: Carolina Arango & Mary Montaño
- Eliminated: Mary Montaño

=== Episode 11 ===
First aired January 22, 2013

- Immunity winner: Lis Henao

=== Episode 12 ===
First aired January 23, 2013

- Immune: Lis Henao
- First call-out: Claudia Castro
- Bottom two: Carolina Arango & Daniela Raad
- Eliminated: Daniela Raad

=== Episode 13 ===
First aired January 24, 2013

- Immunity winner: Carolina Arango

=== Episode 14 ===
First aired January 27, 2013

- Immune: Carolina Arango
- First call-out: Mónica Castaño
- Bottom two: Julieth Roldán & Karin Kipke
- Eliminated: Karin Kipke

=== Episode 15 ===
First aired January 28, 2013

- Eliminated: None

=== Episode 16 ===
First aired January 29, 2013

- Eliminated: None

=== Episode 17 ===
First aired January 30, 2013

- Eliminated: None

=== Episode 18 ===
First aired January 31, 2013

- Eliminated: None

=== Live finale ===
First aired February 1, 2013

- First call-out: Lis Henao
- Bottom Five: Anggie Ann Bryan, Carolina Arango, Cristy Garcés, Julieth Roldán & Martha Medina
- Eliminated: Carolina Arango, Cristy Garcés, Julieth Roldán & Martha Medina
- Final Four: Anggie Ann Bryan, Claudia Castro, Lis Henao & Mónica Castaño
- Colombia's Next Top Model: Mónica Castaño

== Summaries ==
=== Call-out order ===
Order	Episodes								
Order	2	4	6	8	10	12	14	19	
1	Mónica	Mónica	Carolina	Karin	Martha	Lis	Carolina	Lis	Mónica
2	Anggie	Julieth	Karin	Martha	Mónica	Claudia	Mónica	Claudia	Anggie; Claudia; Lis
3	Claudia	Lis	Julieth	Cristy	Lis	Martha	Claudia	Mónica	Anggie; Claudia; Lis
4	Lis	Martha	Lis	Carolina	Daniela	Karin	Martha	Anggie	Anggie; Claudia; Lis
5	Martha	Claudia	Martha	Lis	Cristy	Anggie	Cristy	Carolina; Cristy; Julieth; Martha	
6	Julieth	Anggie	Cristy	Mónica	Claudia	Julieth	Anggie	Carolina; Cristy; Julieth; Martha	
7	Daniela	Carolina	Daniela	Julieth	Anggie	Mónica	Lis	Carolina; Cristy; Julieth; Martha	
8	Dani	Daniela	Mary	Claudia	Karin	Cristy	Julieth	Carolina; Cristy; Julieth; Martha	
9	Carolina	Mary	Dani	Mary	Julieth	Carolina	Karin		
10	Cristy	Karin	Mónica	Daniela	Carolina	Daniela			
11	Viviana	Cristy	Claudia	Anggie	Mary				
12	Conchita	Viviana	Anggie	Dani					
13	Karin	Dani	Viviana						
14	Mary	Conchita							
15	Eliana; Marcella; Diona; Katalia; Anya; Danioma								
16	Eliana; Marcella; Diona; Katalia; Anya; Danioma								
17	Eliana; Marcella; Diona; Katalia; Anya; Danioma								
18	Eliana; Marcella; Diona; Katalia; Anya; Danioma								
19	Eliana; Marcella; Diona; Katalia; Anya; Danioma								
20	Eliana; Marcella; Diona; Katalia; Anya; Danioma								

The contestant was immune from elimination
The contestant was eliminated
The contestant won the competition

- In episode 1, the final 15 were selected. The opening credits were shown on the judging panel screen. Each scene represented a girl who had made it through to the main competition.
- In episode 2, Mónica was immune from elimination for having performed the best during the meat-packing shoot.
- After episode 2, eliminations took place every second episode. The best-performing girl for each photo shoot was declared the episode before each elimination, with that girl winning immunity from elimination.
- In episodes 15-18, the show took a break from eliminations to prolong the voting session that would decide the top four during the live finale.
- Episode 19 was the live finale. The public vote decided the top four, and from the four remaining contestants, the judges determined the winner.

=== Photo shoot guide ===
- Episode 1 photo & video shoot: Basic black dresses; opening credits
- Episode 2 photo shoots: Meat-packing industry; jewelry beauty shots
- Episode 3 photo shoot: Floating water nymphs in pairs
- Episode 4 photo shoot: Splashing paint
- Episode 5 photo shoot: Posing with snakes in bikinis
- Episode 6 photo shoot: Cheerleaders in the air
- Episode 7 photo shoot: Carnaval de Barranquilla
- Episode 8 photo shoot: Feminine vs masculine alter egos
- Episode 9 photo shoot: Roman Gladiators in pairs
- Episode 10 photo shoot: Comic Book heroes
- Episode 11 photo shoot: Marble statues with a male model
- Episode 12 photo shoot: Soccer fans in body paint
- Episode 13 photo shoot: Black and white swan Ballerinas suspended in the air
- Episode 14 photo shoot: Wrestlers
- Episode 15 photo shoots: Modeling on stilts in pairs; portraying famous celebrities
- Episode 16 photo shoots: Posing in bikinis; Lady Speed Stick campaign with a male model; crying beauty shots
- Episode 17 photo shoots: Pin-up girls with cupcakes; modeling in colorful dresses
- Episode 18 photo shoots: Cover tries; lighting oneself in a warehouse
