= X500 =

X500 may refer to:

- X500 glofiish, a cellphone by former Taiwanese electronics manufacturing company E-TEN
- X.500, a series of computer networking standards
- X500 (film), a Canadian-Colombian-Mexican coproduced drama film released in 2016
- Vivo X500 Pro Max, a mobile phone made by Vivo
