= Colombia's Next Top Model season 2 =

Colombia's Next Top Model
- Season 2
- Judges: Carolina Cruz; Catalina Aristizábal; Kika Rocha; Mauricio Vélez
- No. of contestants: 16
- Winner: Yuriko Londoño
- No. of episodes: 20

Release
- Original network: Caracol TV
- Original release: 13 January – 7 February 2014

Season chronology
- ← Previous; Season 1 Next → Season 3

Colombia's Next Top Model season 2 is the second cycle of Colombia's Next Top Model.

Castings for cycle 2 began on August 6, 2013 and culminated on August 31 of the same year. Carolina Cruz joined Franklin Ramos as the new host, replacing Carolina Guerra, who had to leave the show due to various work commitments. Kika Rocha and Catalina Aristizabal returned for panel this season, while Raul Higuera confirmed his departure from the show. He was replaced by Mauricio Velez.

The prizes for this season included a cash prize of COL$50,000,000, the front cover of Cromos Magazine and a contract with Chica Águila. The winner of the competition was 21-year-old Yuriko Londoño from Bucaramanga.

== Contestants ==
(ages stated are at start of contest)

Contestant	Age	Hometown	Finish	Place
Juliet 'Vanessa' Parra Valencia	25	Medellín	Episode 2	16
Jessica Mata	21	Bogotá	Episode 3	15
Carolina Calvo	22	Barranquilla	Episode 5	14
Juliana 'Titi' Ramírez	22	Cali	Episode 7	13
María Margarita 'Tuti' Vega	21	Valledupar	Episode 9	12
Camila Quintero	21	Medellín	Episode 11	11
Johana Ríos Rivera	25	Cali	Episode 13	10
Katherine Moscoso	23	Rovira	Episode 15	9
Vanessa Ferraro	21	Barranquilla	Episode 20	8–5
Estefanía Infante Cano	21	Cúcuta	Episode 20	8–5
Dayana Zamar Delgado Contreras	26	Cúcuta	Episode 20	8–5
Cristina López Gómez	22	Medellín	Episode 20	8–5
Lina Cardona	23	Medellín	Episode 20	4–2
Lilibeth Romero	21	Cúcuta	Episode 20	4–2
Juliana Moreno Giraldo	25	Medellín	Episode 20	4–2
Yuriko Yoshimura Londoño	21	Bucaramanga	Episode 20	1

== Episodes ==
=== Episode 1 ===
First aired January 13, 2014

Mannequin photo shoot groups
Group	Contestants
One	Carolina, Dayana, Juliana, Tuti & Vanessa P.
Two	Camila, Cristina, Estefanía, Laura & Yuriko
Three	Jessica, Katherine, Mayra, Titi & Vanessa F.
Four	Annie, Johana, Lilibeth, Lina & Zahira

- Eliminated: Annie Barros, Laura Agudelo, Mayra Cervantes & Zahira Díaz
- Featured photographer: Germán Velásquez
- Featured director: Felipe Dote

=== Episode 2 ===
First aired January 14, 2014

- Immune: Johana Ríos
- Eliminated: Vanessa Parra
- Featured photographer: Carlos Gaviria

=== Episode 3 ===
First aired January 15, 2014

Dance challenge
Group	Contestants
One	Dayana, Estefanía, Lilibeth, Titi & Vanessa F.
Two	Carolina, Jessica, Juliana, Tuti & Yuriko
Three	Camila, Cristina, Johana, Katherine & Lina

- Challenge winners: Dayana Delgado, Estefanía Infante, Lilibeth Romero, Titi Ramírez & Vanessa Ferraro
- Immune: Tuti Vega
- First call-out: Vanessa Ferraro
- Bottom two: Camila Quintero & Jessica Mata
- Eliminated: Jessica Mata
- Featured photographer: Nicolas Quevedo

=== Episode 4 ===
First aired January 16, 2014

Acting challenge
Pairs
Camila & Juliana
Carolina & Estefania
Cristina & Titi
Dayana & Lina
Johana & Vanessa F.
Katherine & Lilibeth
Tuti & Yuriko

- Challenge winner: Tuti Vega
- Immunity winner: Estefanía Infante
- Featured photographer: Fabián Garzón

=== Episode 5 ===
First aired January 16, 2014

- Challenge winner: Camila Quintero
- Immune: Estefanía Infante
- First call-out: Lina Cardona
- Bottom two: Carolina Calvo & Titi Ramírez
- Eliminated: Carolina Calvo
- Featured photographer: Zizza Limberti

=== Episode 6 ===
First aired January 20, 2014

- Challenge winner: Estefanía Infante
- Immunity winner: Lina Cardona
- Featured photographer: Oscar Nizo

=== Episode 7 ===
First aired January 21, 2014

- Challenge winner: Camila Quintero
- Immune: Lina Cardona
- First call-out: Yuriko Londoño
- Bottom two: Titi Ramírez & Tuti Vega
- Eliminated: Titi Ramírez
- Featured photographer: Zuan Carreño

=== Episode 8 ===
First aired January 22, 2014

- Immunity Winner: Juliana Moreno

=== Episode 9 ===
First aired January 23, 2014

- Immune: Juliana Moreno
- First call-out: Camila Quintero
- Bottom two: Johana Ríos & Tuti Vega
- Eliminated: Tuti Vega

=== Episode 10 ===
First aired January 24, 2014

- Immunity Winner: Yuriko Londoño

=== Episode 11 ===
First aired January 27, 2014

- Immune: Yuriko Londoño
- First call-out: Vanessa Ferraro
- Bottom two: Cristina López & Camila Quintero
- Eliminated: Camila Quintero

=== Episode 12 ===
First aired January 28, 2014

- Immunity Winner: Lina Cardona

=== Episode 13 ===
First aired January 29, 2014

- Immune: Lina Cardona
- First call-out: Vanessa Ferraro & Yuriko Londoño
- Bottom two: Johana Ríos & Lilibeth Romero
- Eliminated: Johana Ríos

=== Episode 14 ===
First aired January 30, 2014

- Immunity Winner: Lilibeth Romero (Revealed the following episode)

=== Episode 15 ===
First aired January 31, 2014

- Immune: Lilibeth Romero
- First call-out: Juliana Moreno
- Bottom two: Cristina López & Katherine Moscoso
- Eliminated: Katherine Moscoso

=== Episode 16 ===
First aired February 3, 2014

- First call-out: Juliana Moreno & Dayana Delgado
- Eliminated: None

=== Episode 17 ===
First aired February 4, 2014

- First call-out: Juliana Moreno
- Eliminated: None

=== Episode 18 ===
First aired February 5, 2014

- First call-out: Yuriko Londoño
- Eliminated: None

=== Episode 19 ===
First aired February 6, 2014

- Eliminated: None

=== Live finale ===
First aired February 7, 2014

- First call-out: Yuriko Londoño
- Bottom five: Cristina López, Dayana Delgado, Estefanía Infante, Juliana Moreno & Vanessa Ferraro
- Eliminated: Cristina López, Dayana Delgado, Estefanía Infante & Vanessa Ferraro
- Final Four: Juliana Moreno, Lilibeth Romero, Lina Cardona & Yuriko Londoño
- Colombia's Next Top Model: Yuriko Londoño

== Summaries ==
=== Call-out order ===
Order	Episodes									
Order	2	3	5	7	9	11	13	15	20	
1	Johana	Tuti	Estefanía	Lina	Juliana	Yuriko	Lina	Lilibeth	Yuriko	Yuriko
2	Carolina; Cristina; Dayana; Estefania; Jessica; Juliana; Lina; Tuti; Vanessa F. Yuriko	Vanessa F.	Lina	Yuriko	Camila	Vanessa F.	Vanessa F. Yuriko	Juliana	Lina	Juliana; Lilibeth; Lina
3	Carolina; Cristina; Dayana; Estefania; Jessica; Juliana; Lina; Tuti; Vanessa F. Yuriko	Juliana	Dayana	Johana	Yuriko	Juliana	Vanessa F. Yuriko	Vanessa F.	Lilibeth	Juliana; Lilibeth; Lina
4	Carolina; Cristina; Dayana; Estefania; Jessica; Juliana; Lina; Tuti; Vanessa F. Yuriko	Dayana	Tuti	Vanessa F.	Estefanía	Lina	Cristina	Yuriko	Juliana	Juliana; Lilibeth; Lina
5	Carolina; Cristina; Dayana; Estefania; Jessica; Juliana; Lina; Tuti; Vanessa F. Yuriko	Johana	Lilibeth	Cristina	Lilibeth	Estefanía	Juliana	Estefanía	Cristina; Dayana; Estefanía; Vanessa F.	
6	Carolina; Cristina; Dayana; Estefania; Jessica; Juliana; Lina; Tuti; Vanessa F. Yuriko	Lina	Yuriko	Camila	Katherine	Dayana	Katherine	Lina	Cristina; Dayana; Estefanía; Vanessa F.	
7	Carolina; Cristina; Dayana; Estefania; Jessica; Juliana; Lina; Tuti; Vanessa F. Yuriko	Titi	Katherine	Lilibeth	Vanessa F.	Johana	Dayana	Dayana	Cristina; Dayana; Estefanía; Vanessa F.	
8	Carolina; Cristina; Dayana; Estefania; Jessica; Juliana; Lina; Tuti; Vanessa F. Yuriko	Cristina	Cristina	Estefanía	Dayana	Lilibeth	Estefanía	Cristina	Cristina; Dayana; Estefanía; Vanessa F.	
9	Carolina; Cristina; Dayana; Estefania; Jessica; Juliana; Lina; Tuti; Vanessa F. Yuriko	Carolina	Juliana	Juliana	Cristina	Katherine	Lilibeth	Katherine		
10	Carolina; Cristina; Dayana; Estefania; Jessica; Juliana; Lina; Tuti; Vanessa F. Yuriko	Lilibeth	Camila	Katherine	Lina	Cristina	Johana			
11	Carolina; Cristina; Dayana; Estefania; Jessica; Juliana; Lina; Tuti; Vanessa F. Yuriko	Katherine	Johana	Dayana	Johana	Camila				
12	Katherine	Yuriko	Vanessa F.	Tuti	Tuti					
13	Titi	Estefanía	Titi	Titi						
14	Camila	Camila	Carolina							
15	Lilibeth	Jessica								
16	Vanessa P.									

The contestant was put through collectively to the next round
The contestant was immune from elimination
The contestant was eliminated
The contestant won the competition

- Episode 1 was the casting episode.
- In episode 2, Johana was immune from elimination for having performed the best during the photo shoot. The result for that week was based on a contestants' vote. Vanessa P. was eliminated as a result of having received the highest number of votes at 7. Lilibeth received 5 votes, Camila 2, and Katherine and Titi received 1 vote each.
- In episode 3, Tuti was immune from elimination for having performed the best during the photo shoot.
- After episode 3, eliminations took place every second episode. The best-performing girl for each photo shoot was declared the episode before each elimination (except in the last round before the finale, where the best-performing girl (Lilibeth) in the same episode as the elimination), with that girl winning immunity from elimination.
- In episodes 16–19, the show took a break from eliminations to prolong the voting session that would decide the top four during the live finale.
- Episode 20 was the live finale. The public vote decided the top four, and from the four remaining contestants, the judges determined the winner.

=== Photo shoot guide ===
- Episode 1 photo shoot: Mannequins in groups
- Episode 2 photo shoot: Insects and reptiles beauty shots
- Episode 3 photo shoot: Topless mermaids on a military cruiser
- Episode 4 photo shoot: Attacked by a horde of zombies
- Episode 5 photo shoot: Carnival dancers in front of Christ the Redeemer
- Episode 6 photo shoot: Soccer players from around the world
- Episode 7 photo shoot: Landfill couture
- Episode 8 photo shoot: Nude and covered in chocolate
- Episode 9 photo shoot: Beauty and the beast in a cemetery
- Episode 10 photo shoot: Feral animals in the jungle
- Episode 11 photo shoot: Fierce eyes above water
- Episode 12 photo shoot: Palmolive Shampoo ads in a shower
- Episode 13 photo shoot: Boxing in pairs in B&W
- Episode 14 photo shoots: Brides on a sailboat; scuba diving with fabric
- Episode 15 photo shoot: Swimwear on the beach for Chica Aguila
- Episode 16 photo shoots: Colors with a garden hose; happy & sad beauty shots
- Episode 17 photo shoots: Skiing cowgirls for Lady Speed stick; detriments of smoking
- Episode 18 photo shoots: Bats hanging upside down; lifted by a weight lifter in B&W
- Episode 19 photo shoots: Amazonian warriors; portraying Eve in body paint
