= Laura, una vida extraordinaria =

- Genre: Telenovela
- Written by: Marisol Galindo
- Directed by: María Isabel Paramo
- Starring: Julieth Restrepo; Linda Lucía Callejas
- Country of origin: Colombia
- Original language: Spanish
- No. of seasons: 1
- No. of episodes: 23

Production
- Executive producer: Ángela Pulido Serrano
- Producers: Amparo Gutiérrez; Paula Andrea Tovar
- Production locations: Medellín, Bogotá, Santafé de Antioquia, La Ceja and El Retiro
- Camera setup: Multi-camera

Original release
- Network: Caracol Televisión
- Release: 29 July – 1 September 2015

Related
- Los hombres también lloran; Hermanitas Calle

Laura, una vida extraordinaria (English: Laura, an Extraordinary Life, is a Colombian telenovela produced by Ángela Pulido Serrano for Caracol Televisión and distributed by Caracol Televisión Internacional. It is based on some moments of the life of the educator, catholic missionary, Laura Montoya. It stars Julieth Restrepo and Linda Lucía Callejas.

== Plot ==
It is the story late nineteenth century of Laura Montoya, about her beginning in the city of Jericó on her childhood and youth; It was held in a downtown nuns not being accepted by their families; she learned to read and write and received religious instruction to be educator. A few years later she was also accepted at the university, but was despised by discrimination and disreputable about her life as a child. In the end, after many ups and downs, she was recognized as the best exponent catholic missionary founder of the Congregation of the "Misioneras de María Inmaculada y de Santa Catalina de Siena".

== Cast ==
- Julieth Restrepo as Young Laura Montoya
- Linda Lucía Callejas as Laura Montoya
- Adelaida Buscató as Young Clarissa Montoya
- Marcela Carvajal as Clarissa Montoya
- Pilar Álvarez as Dolores Upegui
- José Restrepo as Juan Antonio Montoya
- Elizabeth Minotta as Young Ana Lucía
- Sandra Reyes as Ana Lucía
- Julio Sánchez Cóccaro as Padre Ignacio
- Ricardo Mejía as Young Adolfo Peña
- Juan Carlos Messier as Adolfo Peña
- Biassini Segura as Young Padre Perdomo
- Julio César Herrera as Padre Perdomo
- Jhon Alomia as Jeremias
- Lorena García Escobar as Victoria Peña
- Juliana Velásquez as Marianita
- Nelson Camayo as Carlitos Yaguaré
- Diego Guarnizo as Tomás Carrasquilla / Saturnino

== Episodes ==
No.	Title	Original release date	Colombia viewers (millions)
1	"Desde pequeña Laura se sacrifica por su familia"	29 July 2015	7.6
2	"Laura tiene definido su camino, quiere ser religiosa"	30 July 2015	8.2
3	"Laura gana una beca y se convierte en directora del manicomio"	31 July 2015	7.0
4	"El carisma de Laura hará que en Amalfi renazca la fe"	3 August 2015	8.4
5	"Laura dejará Amalfi para ir a Medellín a continuar con su sueño"	4 August 2015	7.4
6	"Sin querer, Laura hizo un daño difícil de remediar en la iglesia"	5 August 2015	7.9
7	"Laura estará a un paso de ordenarse como monja"	6 August 2015	7.9
8	"La malas lenguas se encargarán de hacerle la vida imposible a Laura"	10 August 2015	7.7
9	"Laura limpiará su mala imagen en Medellín y de qué manera"	11 August 2015	8.1
10	"En ayudar a las personas está la verdadera vocación de Laura"	12 August 2015	8.1
11	"Después de tanto trasegar, Laura se reunirá con los indígenas"	13 August 2015	8.7
12	"El interés de proteger a los indígenas le salió muy caro a Laura"	14 August 2015	8.2
13	"Laura tendrá una transformación que le dará un giro a su existir"	18 August 2015	7.7
14	"El Vaticano responderá a Laura y la apoyará en su misión"	19 August 2015	7.8
15	"La vida le sonreirá a Clarisa, la hermana de Laura, por fin se casará"	20 August 2015	7.6
16	"La misión de Laura está en peligro de caerse por muchos problemas"	21 August 2015	7.8
17	"En su misión Laura se encontrará con un pueblo necesitado"	24 August 2015	8.4
18	"Laura luchó contra una dura enfermedad y la venció"	25 August 2015	8.1
19	"Laura logrará que los niños indígenas sean bautizados"	26 August 2015	7.7
20	"Laura iniciará junto a Anastasia una expedición por tierras agrestes"	27 August 2015	8.4
21	"Una nueva experiencia, Laura compartirá con la comunidad afro"	28 August 2015	7.6
22	"Después de varios años Laura tendrá su propia comunidad religiosa"	31 August 2015	8.0
23	"Un nuevo peregrinar; Laura viajará a Roma para cumplir otra misión"	1 September 2015	8.3

== Ratings ==
Viewership and ratings per season of Laura, una vida extraordinaria
Season	Episodes	First aired		Last aired		Avg. viewers (millions)	18–49 rank
Season	Episodes	Date	Viewers (millions)	Date	Viewers (millions)	Avg. viewers (millions)	18–49 rank
1	23	29 July 2015	7.6	1 September 2015	8.3	7.94	TBD
