= Colombia's Next Top Model season 3 =

Colombia's Next Top Model
- Season 3
- Judges: Carolina Cruz; Kika Rocha; Mauricio Vélez; Karen Carreño
- No. of contestants: 13
- Winner: Alejandra Merlano
- No. of episodes: 21

Release
- Original network: Caracol TV
- Original release: 10 January – 10 February 2017

Season chronology
- ← Previous; Season 2

Colombia's Next Top Model, Cycle 3 is the third cycle of the Colombian reality show based on the popular American format America's Next Top Model in which a number of women compete for the title of Colombia's Next Top Model and an opportunity to start her career in the modeling industry. The premiere of the third season was January 10, 2017.

The winner of the competition was 20 -year old Alejandra Merlano from Armenia.

== Contestants ==
(ages stated are at start of contest)

Name	Age	Height	Hometown	Finish	Place
Dana Ceballos	20	1.66 m (5 ft 5 1/2 in)	Cali	Episode 2	13
Catherine Peña	23	1.78 m (5 ft 10 in)	Bogotá	Episode 4	12
Valentina Londoño	26	1.66 m (5 ft 5 1/2 in)	Medellín	Episode 6	11
Valentina Ortiz	18	1.75 m (5 ft 9 in)	Bogotá	Episode 8	10
Valentina Lagarejo	18	1.79 m (5 ft 10 1/2 in)	Cali	Episode 10	9
Laura Espada	22	1.74 m (5 ft 8 1/2 in)	Cali	Episode 12	8
Valentina Caicedo	18	1.76 m (5 ft 9 1/2 in)	Cali	Episode 14	7
Paula Zamudio	22	1.74 m (5 ft 8 1/2 in)	Bogotá	Episode 16	6
Sofia Cuello	22	1.68 m (5 ft 6 in)	San Juan del Cesar	Episode 18	5
Karen Soto	20	1.81 m (5 ft 11 1/2 in)	Cali	Episode 20	4
Sasha Palma	22	1.80 m (5 ft 11 in)	Riosucio	Episode 21	3-2
María Camila Giraldo	22	1.73 m (5 ft 8 in)	Cali	Episode 21	3-2
Alejandra Merlano	20	1.75 m (5 ft 9 in)	Armenia	Episode 21	1

== Episodes ==
=== Episode 1 ===
First aired January 10, 2017

- Immune: María Camila Giraldo

=== Episode 2 ===
First aired January 11, 2017

- Bottom two: Dana Ceballos & Sasha Palma
- Eliminated: Dana Ceballos

=== Episode 3 ===
First aired January 12, 2017

- Immune: Valentina Caicedo

=== Episode 4 ===
First aired January 13, 2017

- Challenge winner: Alejandra Merlano
- Best photo: María Camila Giraldo
- Bottom two: Paula Zamudio & Catherine Peña
- Eliminated: Catherine Peña

=== Episode 5 ===
First aired January 16, 2017

- Immune: Paula Zamudio

=== Episode 6 ===
First aired January 17, 2017

- Challenge winner: Karen Soto
- Best photo: Valentina Lagarejo
- Bottom two: Valentina Londoño & Valentina Ortiz
- Eliminated: Valentina Londoño

=== Episode 7 ===
First aired January 18, 2017

- Immune: Sasha Palma

=== Episode 8 ===
First aired January 19, 2017

- Challenge winner: Paula Zamudio
- Best photo: Alejandra Merlano
- Bottom two: Sofia Cuello & Valentina Ortiz
- Eliminated: Valentina Ortiz

=== Episode 9 ===
First aired January 20, 2017

- Immune: Alejandra Merlano

=== Episode 10 ===
First aired January 26, 2017

- Challenge winner: Alejandra Merlano
- Best photo: Karen Soto
- Bottom two: Laura Espada & Valentina Lagarejo
- Eliminated: Valentina Lagarejo

=== Episode 11 ===
First aired January 27, 2017

- Immune: Alejandra Merlano

=== Episode 12 ===
First aired January 30, 2017

- Challenge winner: Alejandra Merlano
- Best photo: María Camila Giraldo
- Bottom two: Laura Espada & Valentina Caicedo
- Eliminated: Laura Espada

=== Episode 13 ===
First aired January 31, 2017

- Immune: Karen Soto

=== Episode 14 ===
First aired February 1, 2017

- Challenge winner: Sofia Cuello
- Best photo: María Camila Giraldo
- Bottom two: Paula Zamudio & Valentina Caicedo
- Eliminated: Valentina Caicedo

=== Episode 15 ===
First aired February 2, 2017

- Immune: Karen Soto

=== Episode 16 ===
First aired February 3, 2017

- Challenge winner: Sofia Cuello
- Best photo: Sasha Palma
- Bottom two: Paula Zamudio & Sofia Cuello
- Eliminated: Paula Zamudio

=== Episode 17 ===
First aired February 6, 2017

=== Episode 18 ===
First aired February 7, 2017

- Best photo: María Camila Giraldo
- Bottom three: Karen Soto, Sasha Palma & Sofia Cuello
- Eliminated: Sofia Cuello

=== Episode 19 ===
First aired January 8, 2017

- Immune/Best photo: Sasha Palma

=== Episode 20 ===
First aired February 9, 2017

- Bottom two: Karen Soto & María Camila Giraldo
- Eliminated: Karen Soto

=== Episode 21 ===
First aired February 10, 2017

- Colombia's Next Top Model: Alejandra Merlano

== Call-out order ==
Order	Episodes										
Order	2 (Note: Episode 1 was the casting episode.) (Note: In episode 2, María Camila was immune from elimination for having performed the best during the photo shoot. After deliberation, the judges named Sofía and Karen the best performers, while singling out Dana and Sasha as the worst.)	4	6	8	10	12	14	16	18 (Note: In episode 18, Karen, Sasha and Sofia were called forward as the bottom three. Karen and Sasha were saved collectively, and Sofia was eliminated.)	20 (Note: In episode 20, Sasha advanced directly to the final after having been given immunity for performing the best during the photo shoot.)	21
1	María Camila	Valentina C.	Paula	Sasha	Alejandra	Alejandra	Karen	Karen	María Camila	Sasha	Alejandra
2	Sofia	María Camila	Valentina La.	Alejandra	Karen	María Camila	María Camila	Sasha	Alejandra	Alejandra	María Camila; Sasha
3	Karen	Karen	Karen	Valentina La.	María Camila	Paula	Alejandra	Alejandra	Karen; Sasha	María Camila	María Camila; Sasha
4	Alejandra; Catherine; Laura; Paula; Valentina C. Valentina La. Valentina Lo. Valentina O.	Sofia	Alejandra	Paula	Paula	Sofia	Sasha	María Camila	Karen; Sasha	Karen	
5	Alejandra; Catherine; Laura; Paula; Valentina C. Valentina La. Valentina Lo. Valentina O.	Laura	Laura	Valentina C.	Valentina C.	Sasha	Sofia	Sofia	Sofia		
6	Alejandra; Catherine; Laura; Paula; Valentina C. Valentina La. Valentina Lo. Valentina O.	Valentina Lo.	María Camila	María Camila	Sasha	Karen	Paula	Paula			
7	Alejandra; Catherine; Laura; Paula; Valentina C. Valentina La. Valentina Lo. Valentina O.	Alejandra	Valentina C.	Laura	Sofia	Valentina C.	Valentina C.				
8	Alejandra; Catherine; Laura; Paula; Valentina C. Valentina La. Valentina Lo. Valentina O.	Valentina La.	Sofia	Karen	Laura	Laura					
9	Alejandra; Catherine; Laura; Paula; Valentina C. Valentina La. Valentina Lo. Valentina O.	Sasha	Sasha	Sofia	Valentina La.						
10	Alejandra; Catherine; Laura; Paula; Valentina C. Valentina La. Valentina Lo. Valentina O.	Valentina O.	Valentina O.	Valentina O.							
11	Alejandra; Catherine; Laura; Paula; Valentina C. Valentina La. Valentina Lo. Valentina O.	Paula	Valentina Lo.								
12	Sasha	Catherine									
13	Dana										

The contestant was put through collectively to the next round
The contestant was eliminated
The contestant was immune from elimination
The contestant won the competition

Episodes	Contestants			Eliminated
2	Dana	&	Sasha	Dana
4	Catherine	&	Paula	Catherine
6	Valentina Lo.	&	Valentina O.	Valentina Lo.
8	Sofia	&	Valenitna O.	Valentina O.
10	Laura	&	Valentina La.	Valentina La.
12	Laura	&	Valentina C.	Laura
14	Paula	&	Valentina C.	Valentina C.
16	Paula	&	Sofia	Paula
18	Karen	Sasha	Sofia	Sofia
20	Karen	&	Maria Camila	Karen
22	Alejandra	Maria Camila	Sasha	Maria Camila
22	Alejandra	Maria Camila	Sasha	Sasha

The contestant was eliminated after their first time in the bottom two
The contestant was eliminated after their second time in the bottom two
The contestant was eliminated after their third time in the bottom two
The contestant was eliminated and placed as the runner-up

=== Photo shoot guide ===
- Episode 2 photo shoots: Underwater embodying Houdini, promo shots
- Episode 3 photo shoot: Pillow fight in lingerie with male models
- Episode 4 photo shoot: Zombies in a cemetery
- Episode 5 photo shoot: Sexy fire fighters
- Episode 6 photo shoot: Posing in a bath of flowers and ice
- Episode 7 photo shoot: Colonial beauties
- Episode 8 photo shoot: Golden goddesses embodying Bachué
- Episode 9 photo shoot: Beauty shots with jewelry for Masglo
- Episode 10 photo shoot: Farm style posing with a piggy
- Episode 11 photo shoot: In the circus
- Episode 12 photo shoot: Covered in oil
- Episode 13 photo shoot: Seven deadly sins
- Episode 14 photo shoot: Dance genres
- Episode 15 photo shoot: Life-size dolls
- Episode 16 photo shoot: Natural smiling beauty shots
- Episode 17 photo shoot: Colorful powder while jumping from a trampoline
- Episode 18 photo shoot: Sightseeing selfies
- Episode 19 photo shoot: Warriors fighting against themselves
- Episode 20 photo shoots: Posing as art painting; CROMOS cover try
- Episode 21 photo shoots: Posing as Cleopatra
