= Linda Lucía Callejas =

Colombian actress and model

Linda Lucia Callejas
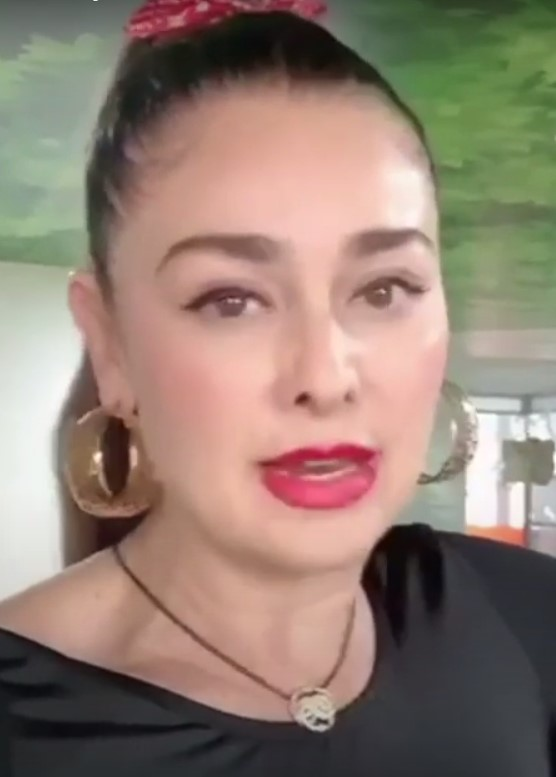
- Born: 27 December 1970 (age 55); Medellín, Antioquia, Colombia
- Occupations: Actress and Model
- Years active: 1990- Present

Linda Lucía Callejas Maya is a Colombian model, singer, business administrator, and actress. She participated in the national beauty contest representing Antioquia in 1989.

== Career ==
Linda Lucía Callejas entered the National Beauty Contest in 1989 representing Antioquia in Cartagena, where she won the Best Fantasy Costume award.

== Filmography ==
=== Television ===
Year	Title	Character	Channel
2019	The Briceños	Mrs. Amalfi	Netflix
2019	Beyond Time	María Cano (1 episode)	Teleantioquia
2019	The Primipara	Lucero	Teleantioquia
2018-2019	Crazy for you	Maruja de Arango	Snail Television
2016-2017	When you live with me	Josefa Mendez	Snail Television
2015	Laura, una vida extraordinaria	Mother Laura Montoya	Snail Television
2015	Devil's Corner		UniMore
2014	The goat		UniMore
2013	Perfect Lies	Rachel	Snail Television
2013	Vampire Girl	Mary McLaren	RCN Channel
2012	House of Queens		RCN Channel
2012	Escobar: the patron of evil	Dona Enelia de Escobar (Young)	Snail Television
2011-2012	Wild Flower	breeches	Telemundo
2011	Love and fear	Dolores Aragon de Benitez	Snail Television
2010	Extreme Decisions		Telemundo
2010	The clone	Glory	Telemundo
2010	Mrs. Bella	Carolina de Mendoza	RCN Channel
2008-2009	Without breasts there is no paradise	Imelda Beltran "Doña Imelda"	Telemundo
2008	The poster	Belinda (Juanita's friend)	Snail Television
2007-2008	No one is eternal in the world	Marimar Infante	Snail Television
2006	For love	Dolores Garcia	RCN Channel
2005-2006	The dance of life	Marcela Piedrahita	Snail Television
1997-1998	María Celina	Maria Celina Quintero	Univision
1997	Pretty Lady	Maria del Pilar	Jorge Barón Television
1996	If they leave us	Maria Lucia	Jorge Barón Television
1995	Soledad	Loneliness	Jorge Barón Television
1992-1993	Lucerito	Lucero "Lucerito" Cardenas	Jorge Barón Television
1992	Nobody's daughter	ximena	Jorge Barón Television
1991	Shadow of your shadow	aura maria	Jorge Barón Television
1990	Music teacher	Azucena	Snail Television
1990	Marianela		

== Cinema ==
Year	Title	Character
2019	To the sound that they touch me I dance	Elizabeth (adult)
2019	Hero Soul	Mariana Miranda
2017	Green Butterflies	Gladys
2010	Without tits there is no paradise	Hilda Santana

== Theater ==
- Ruben's bolero
- Hollywood Night "Angels and Roses"
- Infidels (Colombia)
- Love is stronger than death
- Soul friends
- The house of pleasure
- Death

== Awards and nominations ==
=== TVyNovelas Awards ===
Year	Category	Soap opera or series	Result
2011	Best Supporting Actress in a Telenovela	The clone	Nominated
1996	Favorite Leading Actress in a Series	Soledad	Nominated
