= Mónica Castaño =

Colombian model (born 1989)

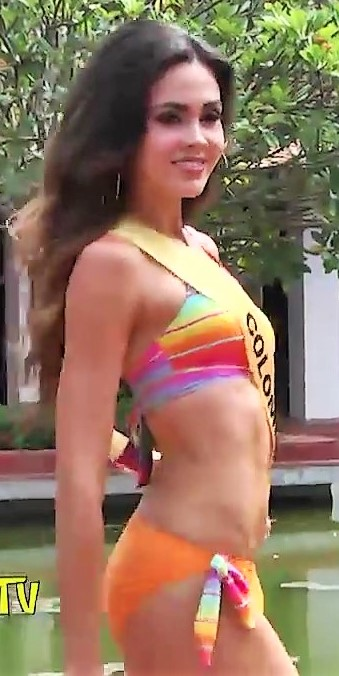
- Castaño at the Miss Grand International 2014 swimsuit competition
- Born: Mónica Castaño Agudelo; 5 June 1989 (age 37); Pradera, Valle del Cauca, Colombia
- Height: 1.80 m (5 ft 11 in)
- Beauty pageant titleholder
- Title: Miss Grand Colombia 2014; Miss Supranational Colombia 2015
- Hair color: Light brown
- Eye color: Brown
- Major competitions: Miss Grand International 2014 (4th Runner-Up); Miss Supranational 2015 (2nd Runner-Up)

Mónica Castaño Agudelo (born 5 June 1989) is a Colombian beauty queen and model.

== Colombia's Next Top Model ==
Castaño was selected to be one of the final fifteen contestants of the first cycle of Colombia's Next Top Model. She was voted as one of the four finalists by the Colombian public with 17.8% of the vote, becoming one of the "Chicas Águila" for 2013 along with Anggie Bryan, Claudia Castro and Lis Henao. She beat out Bryan, Castro and Henao to win the competition. Her prizes included $100,000,000 in cash and a cover of Cromos magazine.

== Finearom ==
She is currently working as a commercial director at the company Finearom.

== Pageantry ==
Castaño represented Pradera at the Señorita Valle 2011 pageant, where she was the virreina. She is Miss Grand Colombia 2014 and Miss Orito Ingi-Ande 2014. In October 2014, she represented Colombia at the Miss Grand International 2014 pageant in Bangkok, where she finished as the fourth-runner-up to Daryanne Lees of Cuba. In the Miss Supranational 2015 pageant, she finished as the second runner-up to Stephania Stegman of Paraguay.
