= List of Colombian saints =

This is a list of Colombian saints, beatified and venerable persons, and Servants of God.

== Saints ==
- Laura Montoya (26 May 1874 – 21 October 1949) is the only Roman Catholic Saint of Colombian nationality to this day, having been the foundress of the Congregation of the Missionary Sisters of the Immaculate Virgin Mary and Saint Catherine of Siena (1914), and a missionary to the indigenous peoples within the Antioquia department.

Some religious men and women have been declared saints by the Roman Catholic Church for their actions on Colombian territory:

- Louis Bertrand (Spanish Dominican priest who was a missionary and preacher in the Caribbean Coast of Colombia in the 16th century)
- Maria Bernarda Bütler (Swiss Franciscan religious foundress of a missionary congregation in Ecuador who also carried out missionary work in the Caribbean Coast region of Colombia, specifically in Cartagena, in the 19th and 20th centuries)
- Peter Claver (Spanish Jesuit priest who was a missionary in the then Kingdom of New Granada, 17th century, in what is today the Caribbean Region of Colombia, specially in Cartagena)
- Ezequiél Moreno y Díaz (Spanish Augustinian bishop and missionary who served as the Bishop of the city of Pasto in the 19th century)

== Beatified persons ==
- Arturo Ayala Nino, OH
- Maria Josefa Karolina Brader
- Encarnación Rosal
- Esteban Maya Gutierrez, OH
- Eugenio Ramirez Salazar, OH
- Gaspar Paez Perdomo, OH
- Jesus Anibal Gomez y Gomez, CMF
- Jesús Emilio Jaramillo Monsalve
- Juan Bautista Velazquez Perez, OH
- Luigi Variara, SDB
- Melquiades Ramirez Zuluoga, OH
- Mariano de Jesús Euse Hoyos
- Pedro María Ramírez Ramos
- Ruben de Jesus Lopez Aguilar, OH
- Maria Berenice Hencker, OP

== Venerable persons ==
- Rafael Almansa
- Marcelina de San José Aveledo y Aveledo
- Isabel Tejada Cuartas
