= Colombia's Next Top Model =

- Official Show Logo
- Genre: Reality television
- Created by: Tyra Banks
- Presented by: Carolina Guerra (2013); Carolina Cruz (2014–2017)
- Judges: Raúl Higuera (2013); Catalina Aristizábal (2013–2014); Kika Rocha (2013–2017); Mauricio Vélez(2014–2017); Karen Carreño (2017)
- Country of origin: Colombia
- Original language: Spanish
- No. of seasons: 3
- No. of episodes: 59

Production
- Running time: 60 mins

Original release
- Network: Caracol TV
- Release: January 8, 2013 – February 10, 2017

Colombia's Next Top Model is a Colombian reality television series, based on Tyra Banks' America's Next Top Model. It is the third franchise in Latin America after Brazil's Next Top Model and Mexico's Next Top Model. The series began to air on Caracol TV on January 8, 2013.

== Overview ==
The series features a group of young women who compete for the title of "Colombia's Next Top Model" and a chance to begin their career in the modeling industry.

The second season aired on January 13, 2014. Carolina Cruz was introduced as the new image of the contest and Franklin Ramos remained as the tutor. On the other hand, Kika Rocha and Catalina Aristizábal remained part of the team as judges and Mauricio Vélez entered the show as a replacement of Raúl Higuera who was no longer part of the team for season 2.

== Judges ==
Judge/Mentor	Cycle		
Judge/Mentor	1 (2013)	2 (2014)	3 (2017)
Hosts
Carolina Guerra	Head Judge		
Carolina Cruz		Head Judge	Head Judge
Judging Panelists
Catalina Aristizábal	Main	Main	
Raúl Higuera	Main		
Kika Rocha	Main	Main	Main
Mauricio Vélez		Main	Main
Karen Carreño			Main

== Cycles ==
Cycle	Premiere date	Winner	Runner-up	Other contestants in order of elimination	Number of contestants
1	8 January 2013	Mónica Castaño	Angie Ann Bryan & Claudia Castro & Lis Henao	Eliana Colorado, Conchita Buendía, Viviana Salinas Coy, Dani Estrada, Mary Montaño Quintero, Daniela Raad, Karin de la Hoz Kipke, Martha Medina Garces & Julieth Roldán & Cristy Garcés & Carolina Arango Zapata	15
2	13 January 2014	Yuriko Yoshimura Londoño	Juliana Moreno Giraldo & Lilibeth Romero & Lina Cardona	Vanessa Parra Valencia, Jessica Mata, Carolina Calvo, Titi Ramírez, Tuti Vega, Camila Quintero, Johana Ríos Rivera, Katherine Moscoso, Vanessa Ferraro & Estefanía Infante Cano & Dayana Zamar Delgado Contreras & Cristina López Gomez	16
3	10 January 2017	Alejandra Merlano	Maria Camila Giraldo & Sasha Palma	Dana Ceballos, Catherine Peña, Valentina Londoño, Valentina Ortiz, Valentina Lagarejo, Laura Espada, Valentina Caicedo, Paula Zamudio, Sofia Cuello, Karen Soto	13
