= La Playa DC =

2012 film

- Theatrical release poster
- Directed by: Juan Andrés Arango
- Written by: Juan Andrés Arango
- Produced by: Jorge Andrés Botero
- Starring: Luis Carlos Guevara; Jamés Solís; Andrés Murillo
- Cinematography: Nicolas Canniccioni
- Edited by: Felipe Guerrero
- Distributed by: Cineplex
- Release dates: 23 May 2012 (Cannes); 19 October 2012 (Colombia)
- Running time: 90 minutes
- Countries: Colombia; France; Brazil
- Language: Spanish

La Playa DC is a 2012 internationally co-produced drama film written and directed by Juan Andrés Arango. The film competed in the Un Certain Regard section at the 2012 Cannes Film Festival. The Spanish-language film was selected as the Colombian entry for the Best Foreign Language Film at the 86th Academy Awards, but it was not nominated.

== Cast ==
- Luis Carlos Guevara as Tomás
- Jamés Solís as Chaco
- Andrés Murillo as Jairo

== See also ==
- List of submissions to the 86th Academy Awards for Best Foreign Language Film
- List of Colombian submissions for the Academy Award for Best Foreign Language Film
