= The Seed of Silence =

2015 film

- Film poster
- Directed by: Juan Felipe Cano
- Written by: Camilo De La Cruz
- Produced by: Camilo Molano Parra
- Starring: Andrés Parra; Angie Cepeda; Julián Román
- Cinematography: Alejandro Moreno
- Edited by: Gerson Aguilar
- Music by: Daniel Velasco
- Release date: 3 March 2015
- Running time: 105 minutes
- Country: Colombia
- Language: Spanish

The Seed of Silence (Spanish: La semilla del silencio) is a 2015 Colombian crime film directed by Juan Felipe Cano. The film was on the shortlist for Colombia's entry for the Academy Award for Best Foreign Language Film at the 89th Academy Awards, but it was not selected.

== Cast ==
- Julián Román as Roberto Guerrero
- Angie Cepeda as María del Rosario Durán
- Andrés Parra as Jorge Salcedo
- Christian Tappán as Fabrizio Mendez
- Alejandro Buitrago as Samuel Hincapié
- Julieth Restrepo as Lina
