= At the End of the Spectra =

2006 film

- Spanish: Al Final del Espectro
- Directed by: Juan Felipe Orozco
- Written by: Juan Felipe Orozco; Carlos Esteban Orozco
- Produced by: Juan Felipe Orozco; Alejandro Arango
- Starring: Noëlle Schonwald; Kepa Amuchastegui; Silvia de Dios; Julieth Restrepo; Manuel José Chavez; Carlos Serrato
- Cinematography: Luis Otero; Manuel Castañeda
- Music by: Carlos Esteban Orozco
- Release date: December 15, 2006
- Running time: 100 minutes
- Country: Colombia
- Language: Spanish

At the end of the Spectra (Spanish: Al final del espectro) is a 2006 Colombian horror film produced, directed and co-written by Juan Felipe Orozco.

== Plot ==
After a traumatic situation that turns Vega into an agoraphobe, she decides to live like a hermit in an apartment at her father's suggestion. Her life changes radically as she begins to see the inexplicable and hear the unignorable. As her horrific visions intensify, Vega begins to piece together a dark jigsaw puzzle illuminating evil's malign power. A series of explosive situations: a sinister presence in the apartment, her neighbor's bizarre obsession, and a dark forgotten past, bring the story to a chilling, claustrophobic and tense spiral.

== Cast ==
- Noëlle Schonwald as Vega
- Julieth Restrepo as Tulipán
- Silvia de Dios as Tulipán's Mother
- Manuel José Chavez as Jairo
- Carlos Serrato as Neighbour
- Kepa Amuchastegui as Vega's father

== Production ==
The apartment where Vega lived was originally an abandoned gym. The darkness of the place is similar to that of old apartments in downtown Bogotá.

== Release ==
The film was released on December 15, 2006, and had a successful opening week. At the End of the Spectra was in the first position of the Colombian Box office.

== Remakes ==
During 2007 news broke out that Roy Lee was planning to do an English remake with Nicole Kidman as the lead, targeting a 2010 release date. No information about this remake has appear ever since.

In 2013 a Mexican remake was released, called Demon Inside, directed by Alfonso Pineda Ulloa and starring Paz Vega in the lead.
