= Rock Dinner =

MTV television series

Rock Dinner is a 2008–2013 television series on MTV Tr3s where people in the Los Angeles area cooked dinner for their favorite Latino artists. The artists included Flex, Rakim, Ken-Y, Enrique Iglesias, Kat DeLuna, and Reik.

A version of the show was produced in Mexico City by MTV Latin America, hosted by Colombian model Carolina Guerra.

== See also ==
- List of dining events
