= Candelaria (film) =

2017 film

- Directed by: Jhonny Hendrix Hinestroza
- Screenplay by: Jhonny Hendrix Hinestroza; Carlos Quintela; María Camila Arias; Abel Arango
- Starring: Verónica Lynn; Alden Knight
- Cinematography: Yarará Rodríguez
- Edited by: Anita Remon
- Music by: Alvaro Morales
- Release date: 2017
- Language: Spanish

Candelaria is a 2017 romantic drama film co-written and directed by Jhonny Hendrix Hinestroza.

A co-production between Colombia, Germany, Norway, Argentina and Cuba, the film was entered into the Giornate degli Autori competition at the 74th edition of the Venice Film Festival, in which it won the Fedeora Award for Best Film and the Director’s Award. The film also won two Macondo Awards, for best actor (Alden Knight) and best screenplay.

== Cast ==
- Verónica Lynn as Candelaria
- Alden Knight as Víctor Hugo
- Manuel Viveros as El Negro
- Philipp Hochmair as El Carpintero
- Juan Oscar Margrina as Pereyra
- Diego Tomatis as Pereyra Jr.
- Felix Rondón as Basilio
