= Dear Gentlemen =

2024 Colombian drama film

- Directed by: Patricia Castañeda
- Written by: Patricia Castañeda
- Produced by: Patricia Castañeda
- Starring: Julieth Restrepo
- Production companies: El Circo Film; Ágora Films
- Release date: November 28, 2024 (Colombia)
- Running time: 103 minutes
- Country: Colombia
- Language: Spanish

Dear Gentlemen (Spanish: Estimados señores) is a 2024 Colombian drama film written and directed by Patricia Castañeda. The film explores the history of women's suffrage in Colombia and marks Castañeda's feature directorial debut. The film won ten awards at the 2025 Macondo Awards.

== Plot ==
Set in mid‑20th‑century Colombia, the film follows a group of women advocating for the right to vote. Their personal stories intersect with key political events as they confront institutional resistance and entrenched patriarchal norms.

== Cast ==
- Julieth Restrepo as Esmeralda Arboleda
- Bárbara Perea as Bertha Ospina
- Claudio Cataño as Ortiz
- Marcela Mar as Teresa Santamaría
- Paula Castaño as Josefina Valencia

== Production ==
Filming took place in Bogotá and surrounding regions with support from Colombian cultural institutions.

== Reception ==
Rolling Stone en Español praised the film's emphasis on the political and emotional dimensions of the movement, noting its commitment to portraying the experiences of Colombian women who fought for the right to vote.
