= Louis Bertrand (saint) =

Spanish Dominican missionary

Saint Louis Bertrand OP
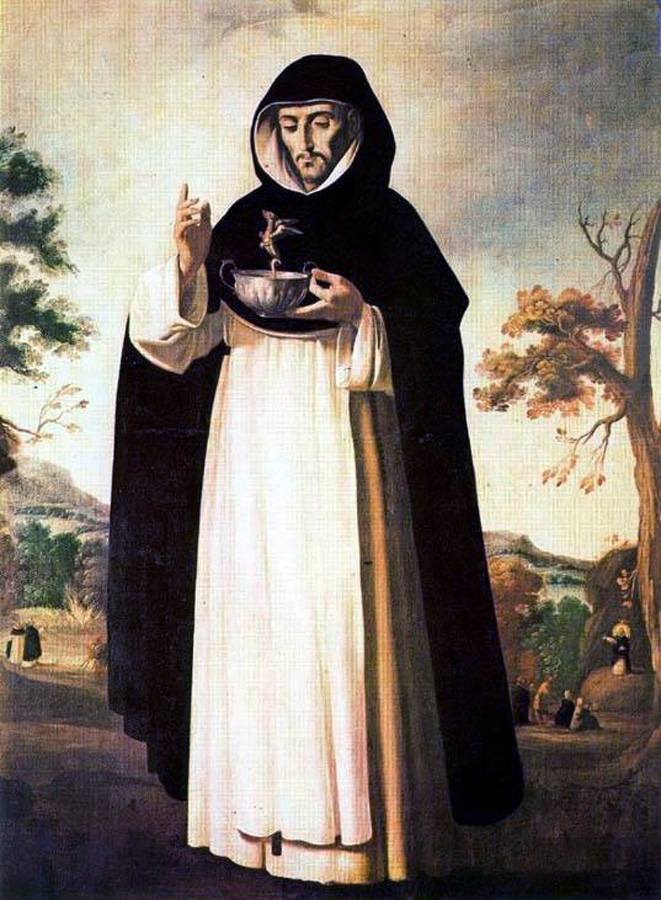
- Spanish Baroque Oil painting of Louis Bertrand by or after Francisco de Zurbarán

"Apostle of South America", priest, missionary, confessor
- Born: 1 January 1526; Valencia, Spain
- Died: 9 October 1581 (aged 55); Valencia, Spain
- Venerated in: Catholic Church
- Beatified: 19 July 1608, Saint Peter's Basilica, Papal States by Pope Paul V
- Canonized: 12 April 1671, Saint Peter's Basilica, Papal States by Pope Clement X
- Major shrine: Saint Peter's Basilica, Vatican City
- Feast: 9 October
- Attributes: A chalice containing a snake
- Patronage: Buñol; New Granada; Colombia

Louis Bertrand (Spanish: Luis Beltrán or Luis Bertrán; Valencian: Lluís Bertran; 1 January 1526 – 9 October 1581) was a Spanish Dominican friar who preached in South America during the 16th century and is known as the "Apostle to the Americas". He is venerated as a saint by the Catholic Church.

== Early life ==
Bertrand was born in Valencia to Juan Bertrand and Juana Angela Exarch. Through his father, he was related to St. Vincent Ferrer, a friar of the Dominican Order. At an early age, he conceived the idea of becoming a Dominican Friar, and despite the efforts of his father to dissuade him, he was clothed in the Dominican habit in the Convent of St. Dominic, Valencia, on 26 August 1544. After the usual period of probation, he pronounced the evangelical vows.

He was grave in demeanour and apparently without any sense of humour, yet had a gentle and sweet disposition that greatly endeared him to those with whom he came in contact. While he could lay no claim to great intellectual gifts, he applied himself assiduously to study. In 1547 he was ordained to the priesthood by the archbishop of Valencia, St. Thomas of Villanova.

He was appointed to the office of master of novices in the convent at Valencia, the duties of which he discharged at different intervals for an aggregate of thirty years. When the plague broke out in Valencia in 1557 he devoted himself to the sick and dying; he prepared the dead for burial and interred them with his own hands.

When the plague had subsided, the zeal of the holy novice master sought to extend the scope of his already large ministry into the apostolate of preaching. Although it is said that "his voice was raucous, his memory treacherous, his carriage without grace", he became a fervent preacher. The cathedral and the most spacious churches were placed at his disposal, but they proved wholly inadequate to accommodate the multitude that desired to hear him. Eventually it became necessary for him to resort to the public squares of the city. It was probably the fame of his preaching that brought him to the attention of St. Teresa, who at this time sought his counsel in the matter of reforming her order.

Bertrand had long cherished the desire to enter the mission fields of the New World. Receiving permission he sailed for America in 1562 and landed at Cartagena, where he immediately entered upon the career of a missionary.

== Missionary work in South America ==
The bull of canonization asserts that he was favored with the gift of miracles and while preaching in his native Spanish, was understood in various languages. With the encouragement of Bartolomé de las Casas, he defended the natives' rights against the Spanish conquerors. From Cartagena, the scene of his first labors, Bertrand was sent to Panama, where in a comparatively short time he converted some 6,000 people. His next mission was at Tubará, situated near the seacoast and midway between the city of Cartagena and the Magdalena River. The success of his efforts at this place is witnessed by the entries of the baptismal registers, in Bertrand's own handwriting, which show that all the inhabitants of the place were received into the Church. Turon places the number of converts in Tubará at 10,000.

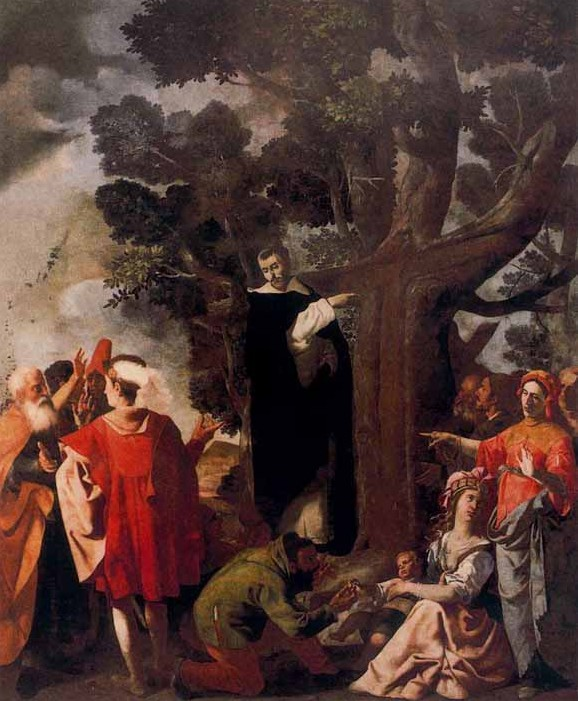
Luis Bertrand

From Tubará, Bertrand went to Cipacoa and Paluato. His success at the former place (the exact location of which is impossible to determine) was nearly equal to that at Tubará. At Paluato the results of his zealous efforts were somewhat disheartening. From this unfruitful soil Bertrand withdrew to the province of Santa Marta, where his former successes were repeated, yielding 15,000 souls. While laboring at Santa Marta, a tribe of 1,500 natives came to him from Paluato to receive baptism, which before they had rejected. The work at Santa Marta finished, the tireless missionary undertook the work of converting the warlike Caribs, probably inhabitants of the Leeward Islands. His efforts among the tribesmen seem not to have been attended with any great success.

Nevertheless, Bertrand used the occasion again to make manifest the protection which overshadowed his ministry. According to legend, a deadly draught was administered to him by one of the native priests. Through Divine interposition, the poison failed to accomplish its purpose.

Tenerife in the Canary Islands became the next field of Bertrand's apostolic labours. Unfortunately, there are no records extant to indicate the result of his preaching there. At Mompox, 37 leagues south-east of Cartagena, we are told, rather indefinitely, that many thousands were converted to the faith. Several of the West Indies islands, notably those of St. Vincent and St. Thomas, were also visited by Bertrand.

== Return to Spain ==
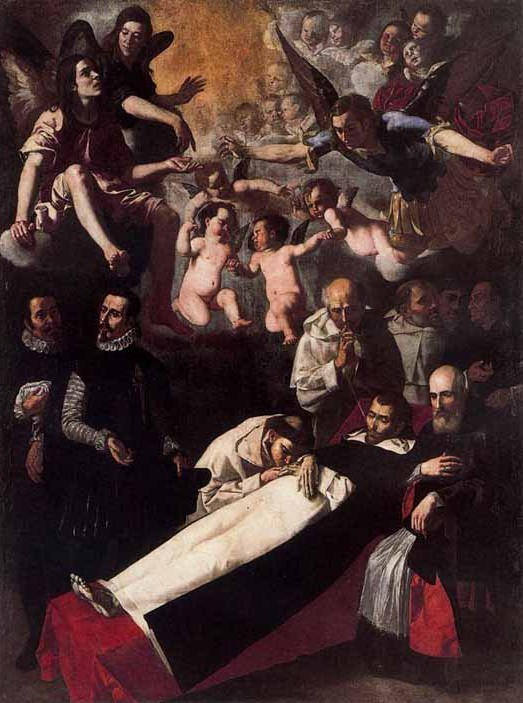
Louis Bertrand

After seven years as a missionary in South America, Bertrand returned to Spain in 1569, to plead the cause of the oppressed Indians, but he was not permitted to return and labour among them. He used his own growing reputation for sanctity, as well as family and other contacts, to lobby on behalf of the native peoples he had encountered, as well as serving in his native diocese of Valencia. There he also became a spiritual counselor to many, including St. Teresa of Ávila.

In 1580, Bertrand fell ill and was carried down from the pulpit of the Valencia cathedral. He died on 9 October 1581, as he is said to have foretold.

Louis Bertrand is sometimes called the "Apostle of South America".

== Veneration ==
He was canonized by Pope Clement X in 1671. His feast day, as reported in the 2004 Martyrologium Romanum, is observed on 9 October.

There is a statue of Louis Bertrand on the north colonnade of St. Peter's Basilica in Rome.

The festival known as La Tomatina is held in Buñol, Valencia, in honor of the town's patron saints, Louis Bertrand and the Mare de Déu dels Desemparats (Mother of God of the Defenseless), a title of the Virgin Mary.

== See also ==
- List of Colombian saints

== Sources ==
- Wilberforce, The Life of St. Louis Bertrand (London, 1882)
- Touron, Histoire des Hommes Illustres de l'Ordre de Saint Dominique (Paris, 1747), IV 485-526
- Roze, Les Dominicains in Amérique (Paris, 1878), 290-310
- Byrne, Sketches of illustrious Dominicans (Boston, 1884), 1-95.
