= The Firefly (2015 film) =

2015 film

- Original title: La luciérnaga
- Directed by: Ana Maria Hermida
- Screenplay by: Ana Maria Hermida
- Produced by: Luisa Casas; Ana Maria Hermida
- Starring: Carolina Guerra; Olga Segura
- Cinematography: Alonso Homs
- Edited by: Juan Falla; Travis Graalman
- Music by: Bartek Gliniak; Sol Okarina
- Distributed by: Producciones iAMredHam
- Release date: March 2015 (ATLFF)
- Running time: 85 minutes
- Countries: Colombia; United States
- Language: Spanish

The Firefly (Spanish: La luciérnaga) is a 2015 (Note: The film is widely reported as having been released in 2013. However, Kickstarter campaigns were activated by writer/director Ana Maria Hermida to help with post-production as late as July 2015. According to Hermida, "I started writing in 2010, I shot it in 2013 and I finished it last year (2015).") Colombian-American romance/fantasy drama film. Written and directed by Ana Maria Hermida, it stars Carolina Guerra and Olga Segura. The film has been regarded as "the first Colombian lesbian film". The film held its European premiere at the 2016 Barcelona International Gay and Lesbian Film Festival.

== Plot ==
Lucia is in a four-year marriage with Adrian, a banker by profession who is emotionally distant. Lucia finds out about the death via traffic accident of her brother Andrés on what was supposed to be his wedding day. Because of the estranged relationship between the siblings, Lucia is the last family member to find out about the death. While mourning, Lucia visits his apartment, where she encounters his fiancée, Mariana, who is also grieving. They develop a bond, in which they promise to look after one another while upholding their memories of Andrés; as the women spend time together, they develop deeper feelings for each other which eventually become romantic. Lucia's circumstances force her to decide between continuing the marriage or being with Mariana. Throughout the film, Lucia and Andrés' sibling relationship is explored, through childhood flashbacks and post-death fantasy sequences.

== Cast ==
- Carolina Guerra as Lucia
- Olga Segura as Mariana
- Manuel José Chaves as Andrés
- Andrés Aranburo as Adrian
- Maria Helena Doering as Mercedes
- Luis Fernando Orozco as Padre Abelardo
- Álvaro Rodríguez as Cepulturero
- Pedro Falla as El Pastuso
- María José Romero as Lucia (Child)
- Nicolas Pena as Adrian (Child)
- Victor Alfonso Hermida as Father of Lucia and Adrian

== Production ==
The film was directly inspired by Hermida's life, but is not autobiographical. Hermida's younger brother died in a car accident in 2007, which was an extreme hardship for Hermida. Afterward, her brother's girlfriend, whom Hermida was already close with, asked to stay with Hermida in New York City for roughly a month. Hermida elaborated, "Knowing she was coming gave me strength. I was able to get out of bed, buy groceries, clean up, and do all the things that seem impossible when you are deeply depressed". During the stay, Hermida noticed the girlfriend observing her, remarking that Hermida looked just like her brother. Hermida described this as "beautiful and interesting", and that it inspired Hermida to form the ideas for this film.

The Firefly is non-linear, and contains numerous flashbacks. The film also features Gothic and Catholic imagery as symbolic channels for Lucia's grief and confusion. Hermida described these and related motifs as imbuing "goth magic realism". Hermida drew inspiration from her Catholic upbringing, as well as from the prominence of Catholicism in Colombia.

The project was filmed in 2013. Much of the filming took place in Colombia, the native country of Hermida, producer Luisa Casas, and lead actress Carolina Guerra. Hermida intentionally wanted to make a film that reflected Colombia in a positive and non-political manner, in order to counteract negative media portrayals and social circumstances of the country. The film utilized cityscapes of Bogotá to fulfill this effort.

During the post-production stages, Hermida started two different fundraisers on Kickstarter for the film, garnering $10,371 between May and July 2015.

== Release ==
The Firefly was screened in 2015 at the Atlanta Film Festival, the Madrid International Film Festival, and the Sarasota Film Festival; in 2016 at the 23rd Annual Mardi Gras Film Festival in Sydney, Australia, and the Colombian Film Festival of New York; and in 2017 at the Dominican Global Film Festival.

The film was released theatrically in Colombia at the Cine Tonalá in Bogotá on November 10, 2016.

=== Home media ===
The Firefly was made available as VOD on Netflix in 2017.

== Accolades ==
| Year | Award | Category | Nominee | Result |
|---|---|---|---|---|
| 2015 | Madrid International Film Festival | Best Foreign Film | | Nominated |
| 2015 | Madrid International Film Festival | Best Lead Actress in a Foreign Language Film | Carolina Guerra | Nominated |
| 2015 | Madrid International Film Festival | Best Supporting Actress | Olga Segura | Nominated |
| 2017 | 6th Macondo Awards | Best Supporting Actor | Manuel José Chavez | Nominated |
