= Juliana Velásquez =

Colombian singer-songwriter

Juliana
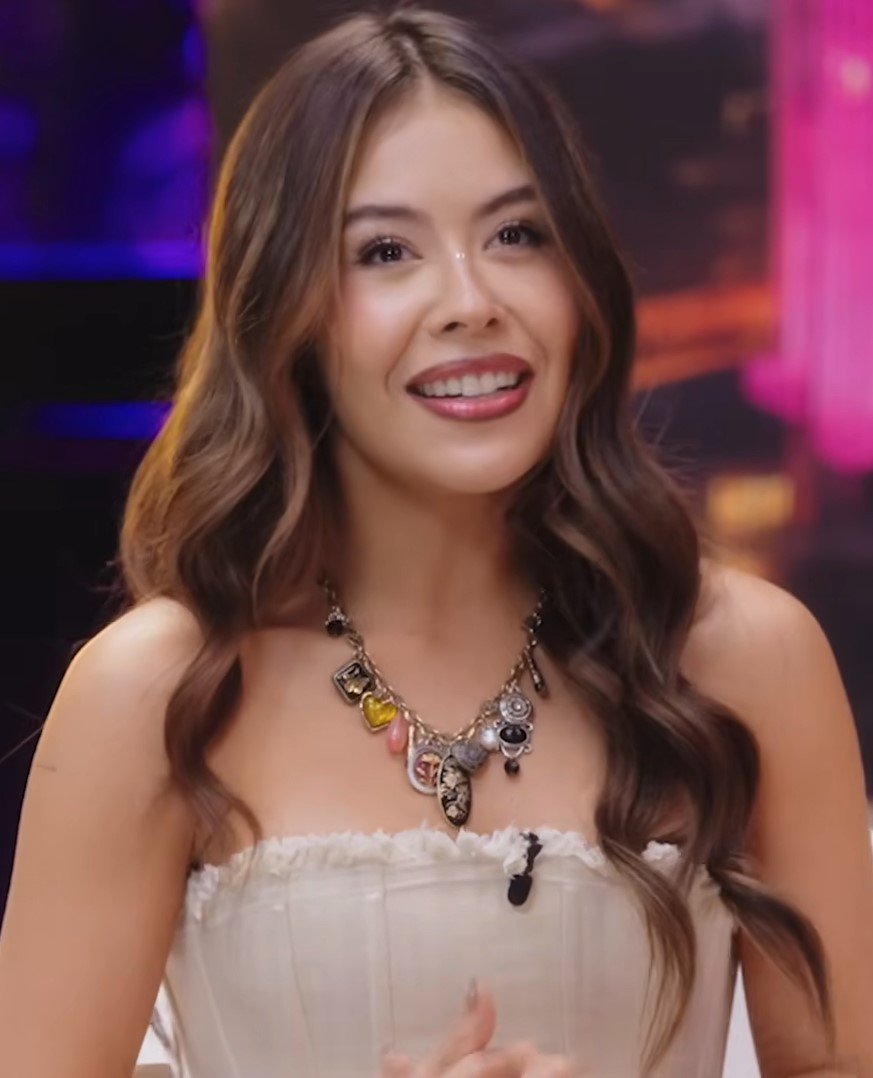
- Juliana Velásquez in 2026
- Born: Juliana Velásquez Buitrago; Bogotá, Colombia
- Occupations: Singer; musician; songwriter
- Awards: Latin Grammy Award for Best New Artist 2021
- Musical career
- Genres: Latin pop
- Instruments: Vocals; piano; guitar
- Label: Warner Music Latina / MUN Records

Juliana Velásquez Buitrago is a Colombian actress, singer, composer, writer and presenter. She is best known for her participation in the reality shows, "Club 10" and "Angelitos". In 2023, she signed a distribution deal with Warner Music Mexico.

== Career ==
She became known for being the winner of the reality show, Angelitos, in 2004 and participating since 2005 in the children's program on Caracol Televisión, Club 10, along with Mery Moon, Aurelio Cheveroni and Dino. Since 2014, she was part of the Play Zone cast as the main presenter, along with Andrés Simón.

At the beginning of 2020, she resumed her career as a singer presenting Montaña Rusa.

In March 2021, she was confirmed as a member of the main cast in the Disney+ original series, It Was Always Me.

In February 2024, she published her first book, Sea Inside, through Montena publishing house.

== Filmography ==
=== Film ===
Year	Title	Role
2024	El bolero de Rubén	Patricia

=== Television ===
Year	Title	Role	Notes
2008	Súper pá	Juliana Cortés	Main role
2009–2010	Las detectivas y el Víctor	Stefany Paola García Rodríguez	Support
2010	Niñas mal	Hermana de Piti	Support
2010–2011	La Pola	Isabel Nariño	Support
2012	Historias clasificadas	Milagros	Support
2015	Laura, una vida extraordinaria	Marianita	Support
2016	Mujeres asesinas	Sofía, la consentida	Main role
2016	Yo soy Franky	Gabriela	Support
2018–2020	Noobees	Soledad	Support
2018–2020	La de troya	Susana	Support
2019	La gloria de Lucho	Leidy Díaz Vargas	Main role
2019	Crime Diaries: Night Out	Jessy Quintero	Main role
2019	La tía Ceci	Daniela	Main role
2020–2021	Pa' quererte	Tatiana Perdomo	Main role
2020	Decisiones: Unos ganan, otros pierden	Tania	Main role
2021	Natalia. crimen y castigo	Natalia Fonseca	Main role
2022	Te la dedico	Manuela Cabrales	Support
2022–2024	Siempre fui yo	Angie Rueda	Support

=== Reality ===
Year	Title	Role	Notes
2015	Baila Fanta	Participant	(Deleted first)
2015	Tu Cara Me Suena	Participant	(Fifth place)
2014–2015	Play Zone	Presenter	
2005–2013	Club 10	Presenter	
2004	Angelitos	Participant	(Winner)

== Discography ==
=== Extended plays ===
- 2020: Dos y Ventidós
- 2022: Delirante

=== Studio albums ===
- 2021: Juliana
- 2022: DOS DOS DOS
- 2023: Mar Adentro
- 2025: La Pista

== Awards and nominations ==
Award ceremony	Year	Category	Nominee(s)/work(s)	Result
Latin Grammy Awards	2021	Best New Artist	Juliana Velásquez	Won
Latin Grammy Awards	2024	Best Traditional Pop Vocal Album	Mar Adentro	Nominated
