= Julieth Restrepo =

Colombian model and actress (born 1986)

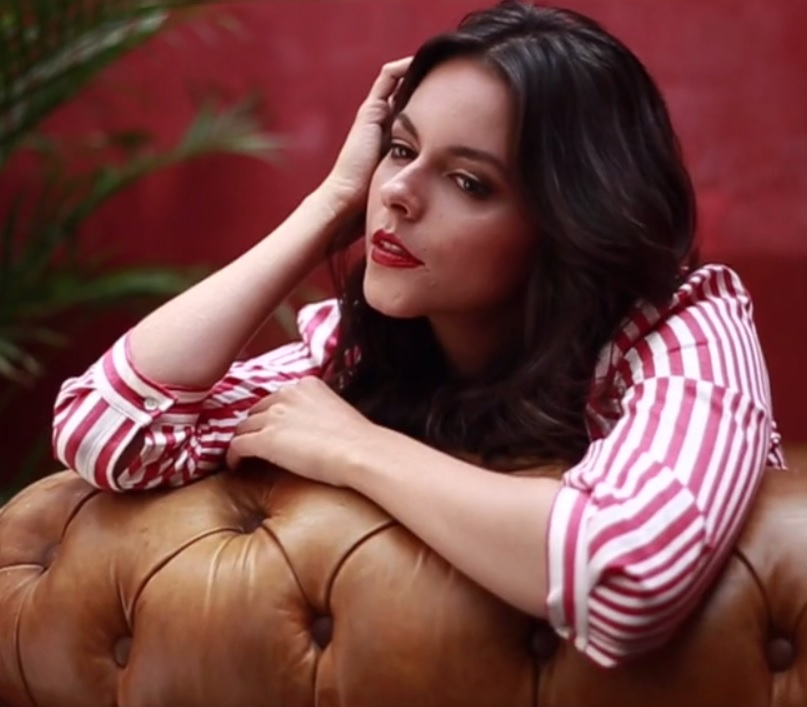
- Restrepo in 2017
- Born: December 19, 1986 (age 39); Medellín
- Occupations: Model and actress
- Known for: At the End of the Spectra, La semilla del silencio and Malcriados

Julieth Restrepo (born December 19, 1986) is a Colombian model and actress.

== Career ==
Restrepo began her acting career with the 2006 Colombian horror film At the End of the Spectra. She has also acted in live theater. She was nominated for Premios India Catalina in best actress category. She acted in the Colombian films La semilla del silencio and Malcriados. As her roles varied from religious to a prostitute, Colombian newspaper La Opinión described her as a versatile actress. She had portrayed Laura of Saint Catherine of Siena on screen in the Colombian show Laura, una vida extraordinaria.

Restrepo starred as the late Colombian suffragist and Senator Esmeralda Arboleda Cadavid in Dear Gentlemen.

In 2023 she started acting in the Netflix miniseries Griselda alongside Sofía Vergara, as Marta Ochoa, cousin of the Ochoa brothers, who are both high-ranking members of the Medellín Cartel. The miniseries was released on January 25, 2024.

In 2025 she played Elsyie in the Netflix series, The Residence.

== Personal life ==
Her hometown is Medellín. She moved to Los Angeles to shoot her first English short movie, Do Not Lose.
