= Carolina Guerra =

Colombian model, actress and television presenter (born 1987)

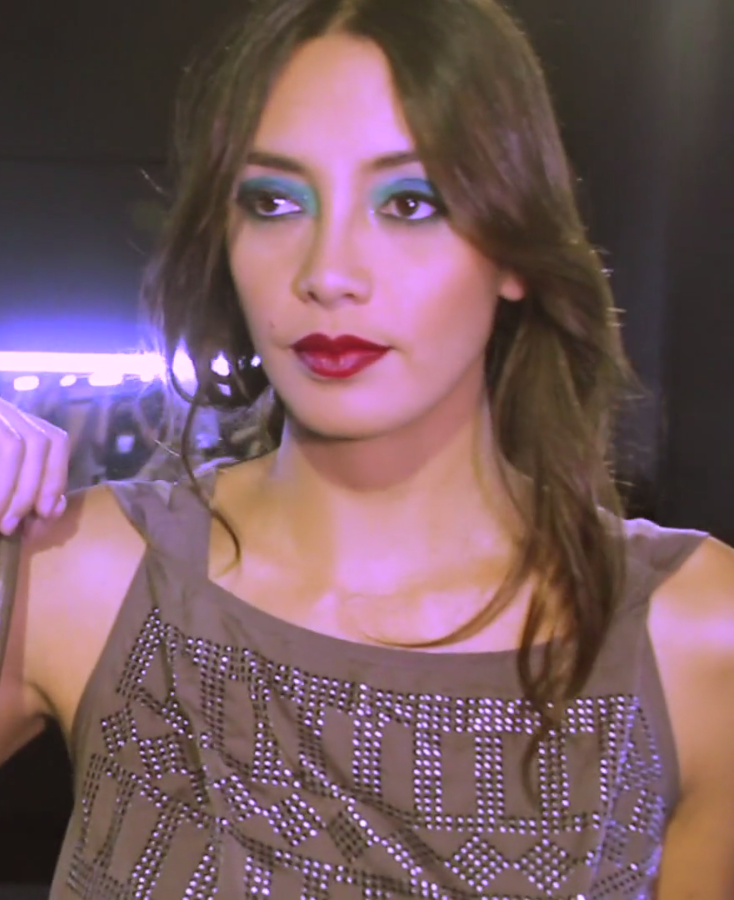
- Guerra at Cali Exposhow in 2011
- Born: Carolina Liliana Guerra Molina; 30 July 1987 (age 39); Bogotá, Colombia
- Occupations: Model, actress, television presenter
- Children: 1

Carolina Guerra (born Carolina Liliana Guerra Molina; 30 July 1987) is a Colombian model, actress and television presenter chosen in 2005 to represent Colombia's capital as Miss Bogotá.

She presented the MTV programme Rock Dinner and appeared in the telenovelas Montecristo, broadcast in Colombia on Caracol TV, and La Diosa Coronada, broadcast in the United States on Telemundo. She played the Inca high priestess Ima in season two of Da Vinci's Demons. In her modelling work she is represented professionally by Stock Models International Model Management. She hosted Colombia's Next Top Model. Guerra, alongside Olga Segura, starred in the 2015 lesbian romance drama The Firefly directed by Ana Maria Hermida.
