= Maria Vicenta Rosal =

Guatemalan Catholic nun

Blessed María Vicenta Rosal Vásquez Beth.
- Born: 26 October 1820; Quetzaltenango, Guatemala
- Died: 24 August 1886 (aged 65); Tulcán, Carchi, Ecuador
- Venerated in: Roman Catholic Church
- Beatified: 4 May 1997, Saint Peter's Square, Vatican City by Pope John Paul II
- Feast: 27 October
- Attributes: Religious habit
- Patronage: Missionaries

María Vicenta Rosal Vásquez, Beth. (in religion, María de la Encarnación del Corazón de Jesús; 26 October 1815 - 24 August 1886) was a Guatemalan Catholic member of the Bethlemite Sisters. Rosal was an advocate of women's education and protection, which proved to be significant in view of the machismo culture that was pervasive in the region at the time.

Her beatification was celebrated in Rome in mid-1997; she is the first female Guatemalan to be beatified.

== Life ==
María Vicenta Rosal Vásquez was born on 26 October 1820 in Quetzaltenango to Manuel Encarnación Rosal (25 March 1791 - 30 May 1851) and Leocadia Gertrudis Benitez Vásquez (December 9 1782 - 13 March 1846). Her mother was married with three children before being widowed in 1816 and later becoming a wife once more this time to Rosal on 18 November 1822. Her elder sister was Ana de la Soledad and an older brother was Isidro. Rosal was baptized on 27 October 1820 in her local parish of Espíritu Santo and she later received her confirmation on 23 January 1840 in that same church.

Youth saw her attending galas and she did demonstrate vain tendencies on occasion which would cause her to receive reprimands from her elder sister Ana de la Soledad. Rosal was reminded that she had to fulfil her baptismal promises and Rosal accepted this and clarified she would change upon turning 20. Rosal soon befriended the Honduran girl Manuela Arbizú and the two spoke of the religious life as well as the Bethlemite Sisters whom her new friend had mentioned. The mentioning of this religious order piqued her interest and she soon dove into learning about them; she consulted with her parents and her confessor and soon decided to go to the convent to become a member of that order.

On 11 December 1837 she departed her home for the convent alongside her father and her brother Isidro as well as her friend Manuela and before entering the order visited the Santa Catalina and Santa Teresa monasteries as well as that of a Capuchin convent; her father did not like the excessive stops and wanted his daughter to be more decisive as to where to go. Rosal entered the Bethlemite Sisters on 1 January 1838 and assumed the new religious name of "María de la Encarnación del Corazón de Jesús" and she later made her vows on 26 January 1840. She received the habit on 16 July 1838 from the last Bethlemite priest Martín de San José. Her first confessor was Urbano Ugarte who had supported her entrance into the religious life. Rosal was frustrated with the religious standards the Bethlemites lived with but despite her frustration was appointed as the prioress of her convent in 1855. In that role she attempted to restore dedication to the original religious standards of her order and the resulting rancor with established members of her order caused her to found a new convent of the Bethlemite Sisters in Quetzeltenango in 1851. Her second confessor around this stage was the Jesuit priest Ignacio Taboada.

Rosal's progress at reform in Quetzeltenango was interrupted when Justo Rufino Barrios became the nation's president and began expelling members of religious orders. Rosal was exiled from Guatemala as a result of this and in 1877 founded the first school for women in Carthage in Costa Rica and also at Heredia not to far from there. But religious persecution spread to Costa Rica in due course and Rosal fled to Colombia where she established an orphanage and a refuge for women in Pasto. Rosal settled for one final time this time in Ecuador where she established convents for the Bethlemite Sisters in Tulcán and in Otavalo. Rosal busied herself with the revision of the constitutions and the planning of new convents as well as her determination to better organize it and direct their efforts to its charism and work.

Rosal died on 24 August 1886 at 5:00am in Ecuador due to an accident horseback riding as she travelled between religious institutions. The nun decided to go on a trip with other nuns for their work and the accident then occurred not long after resulting in her death from her sustained injuries. Her remains are interred in Pasto and are incorrupt.

== Beatification ==
The beatification process commenced in Pasto in an informative process that spanned from 14 March 1951 until its closure in 1952; there were fourteen witnesses all up that were interviewed with eight of those people having known her. Eight members of the faithful were interviewed as were five Bethlemite nuns and one diocesan priest. Her writings received full approval from theologians on 18 April 1955 after it was confirmed her spiritual writings were all in line with official doctrine. The formal introduction to the cause on 5 April 1976 under Pope Paul VI and she became titled as a Servant of God. The Congregation for the Causes of Saints validated the informative process on 3 July 1992 in Rome and later received the Positio from the postulation in 1993. Historians approved the cause's direction on 9 March 1993 while theologians approved the cause on 11 November 1994 as did the C.C.S. on 7 February 1995. Pope John Paul II confirmed that Rosal lived a life of model heroic virtue and thus named her as Venerable on 6 April 1995.

The miracle for beatification was investigated and then received C.C.S. validation on 10 June 1994 before a board of medical experts approved it on 11 January 1996. The theologians also approved this on 16 April 1996 as did the C.C.S. on 2 July 1996 before John Paul II issued his final approval to this miracle on 17 December 1996 - the miracle in question was a 1975 healing from Colombia. John Paul II beatified Rosal on 4 May 1997 in Saint Peter's Square.
