= Guilty Men (film) =

2016 film

- Film poster
- Directed by: Iván Gaona
- Written by: Iván Gaona
- Starring: René Diaz Calderón
- Release date: 13 October 2016
- Running time: 115 minutes
- Country: Colombia
- Language: Spanish
- Box office: $23,759

Guilty Men (Spanish: Pariente) is a 2016 Colombian drama film directed by Iván Gaona. It was selected as the Colombian entry for the Best Foreign Language Film at the 90th Academy Awards, but it was not nominated.

== Plot ==
In rural Santander in 2005, a trucker/DJ plays a cat-and-mouse game with local paramilitary groups while trying to win back his lover.

== Cast ==
- René Diaz Calderón as René
- Willington Gordillo as Willington
- Leidy Herrera as Mariana

== See also ==
- List of submissions to the 90th Academy Awards for Best Foreign Language Film
- List of Colombian submissions for the Academy Award for Best Foreign Language Film
