= The Nobodies (film) =

2016 film

- Los Nadie
- Directed by: Juan Sebastián Mesa
- Written by: Juan Sebastián Mesa
- Produced by: Alexander Arbelaez; José Manuel Duque
- Starring: Esteban Alcaraz
- Cinematography: David Correa
- Edited by: Isabel Otálvaro
- Music by: O.D.i.O.
- Production company: Monociclo Cine
- Release date: 2016
- Country: Colombia
- Language: Spanish
- Budget: $2,000

The Nobodies (Spanish: Los nadie) is a 2016 Colombian drama film written and directed by Juan Sebastián Mesa, in his directorial debut.

The film premiered at the 73rd edition of the Venice Film Festival, in the International Critics' Week competition, in which it was awarded best film.

== Plot ==
In Medellín, friends Mechas, Manu, Ana, Camilo, and Pipa are a group of young anarcho-punk street artists who feel outcast by society and much of their respective families. They perform tricks on the street for money, mainly juggling. The film has a very loose structure, lacking a clearly defined plot. It mainly focuses on the group being quintessentially young - exploring the local musical scene, arguing with their parents, and just hanging out with one another.

== Cast ==
- Esteban Alcaraz as Mechas
- Maria Camila Castrillón as Manu
- Maria Angélica Puerta as Ana
- Alejandro Pérez Ceferino as Camilo
- Luis Felipe Álzate as Pipa

== Soundtrack ==
The film features music from the local punk-rock band O.D.I.O.

== Production ==
Shot in black and white in a week, the film had a reported budget of $2,000.

== Reception ==
On the review aggregator website Rotten Tomatoes, 100% of 5 critics' reviews are positive, with an average rating of 6.9/10.
