= Juan Andrés Arango =

Colombian-Canadian film director

Juan Andrés Arango García
- Born: September 19, 1976; Bogotá, Colombia
- Education: Concordia University
- Occupation: Film director
- Years active: 2012–present
- Notable work: La Playa DC, X500, The Seven Last Words

Juan Andrés Arango García (born September 19, 1976) is a Colombian-Canadian film director. His debut feature film, La Playa DC, premiered at the 2012 Cannes Film Festival and was selected as the Colombian entry for the Best Foreign Language Film at the 86th Academy Awards.

Originally from Bogotá, Colombia, he has resided primarily in Montreal, Quebec since commencing graduate studies in film at Concordia University in 2006.

His second film, X500, debuted at the 2016 Toronto International Film Festival.

In 2019 he was one of seven directors, alongside Kaveh Nabatian, Sophie Goyette, Sophie Deraspe, Karl Lemieux, Ariane Lorrain and Caroline Monnet, of the anthology film The Seven Last Words (Les sept dernières paroles).

His 2026 film Where the River Begins (Donde comenzia el rio) is slated to premiere in the Centrepiece program at the 2026 Toronto International Film Festival.
