= We Are the Heat =

We are the Heat
- Theatrical release poster
- Directed by: Jorge Navas
- Screenplay by: Diego Vivanco and Steven Grisales
- Produced by: Steven Grisales
- Starring: Duván Arizala, José Luis Paz, Miguel Ángel Micolta, Manuel Riascos and Julio Valencia
- Music by: ChocQuibTown
- Release date: September 13, 2018
- Running time: 1h 44m
- Countries: Colombia; Argentina
- Language: Spanish

We are the Heat (original: Somos Calentura) is a 2018 Colombian-Argentine drama film about young men in Colombia who are affected by the drug trade. The film was written by Diego Vivanco and Steven Grisales and directed by Jorge Navas It stars Duván Arizala, José Luis Paz, Miguel Ángel Micolta, Manuel Riascos and Julio Valencia.

The film was exhibited at the Warsaw International Film Festival and the Havana Festival. Somos Calentura is part of the multi award-winning transmedia project We Are the Heat, formerly known as Mon Amour, created by Steven Grisales and Juan DiazB. The transmedia project was recognized with the Best Digital Cases Award, MIP CUBE & MIP TV, 2012, MIDEM Award, Best Latin American Transmedia Project in Multi- Platform, Rio Content Market Lab, Rio de Janeiro, 2012 and was a finalist in the Pixel Pitch Power to the Pixel Competition, International Film Festival, London, 2012.

In 2015, Jorge Navas was invited to take part in the project as director of the film. That year the film won the FDC Integral production fund.

== Synopsis ==
In Buenaventura, Colombia lifelong friends Harvey, Freddy, Baby, and Caleñito are the undisputed kings of hip-hop dance, but when the local drug trade tightens around them, they must decide between the pull of the streets and their dreams.

== Cast ==
- Duván Arizala es "Harvey"
- Miguel Ángel Micolta es "Steven"
- José Luis Paz es "Freddy"
- Manuel Riascos es "El Baby"
- Julio Valencia es "Rebook"
- Heidy Mina es "Lindsay"
