= Macondo Awards =

- Current: 13th Macondo Awards
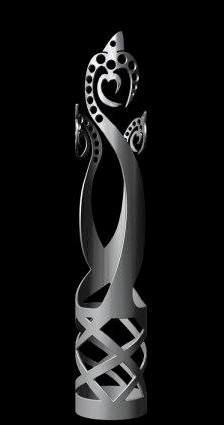
- Country: Colombia
- Presented by: Colombian Academy of Cinematography Arts and Sciences
- First award: 2010
- Website: Official website

The Macondo Awards are given by the Colombian Academy of Cinematography Arts and Sciences (Spanish: Academia Colombiana de Artes y Ciencias Cinematográficas) to honor achievement in Colombian cinema.

The awards are given annually since 2010 by the Academy, whose members include Colombian actors, directors, producers, and industry film technicians.

== History ==
The first edition of the Macondo Awards was held in October 2010 at the Jorge Eliécer Gaitán Theatre. The award's name is based on Macondo, the fictional town in Gabriel García Márquez's novel, One Hundred Years of Solitude. The statuette was created by Roberto Cano and is based on the Macondo tree.

== Awards ==
- Best Film (Mejor Película)
- Best Documentary (Mejor Documental)
- Best Director (Mejor Director)
- Best Original Screenplay (Mejor Guión Original)
- Best Lead Actor (Mejor Actor Principal)
- Best Lead Actress (Mejor Actriz Principal)
- Best Supporting Actor (Mejor Actor de Reparto)
- Best Supporting Actress (Mejor Actriz de Reparto)
- Best Cinematography (Mejor Fotografía)
- Best Editing (Mejor Montaje)
- Best Ibero-American Film (Mejor Película Iberoamericana)
- Best Original Score (Mejor Música Original)
- Best Original Song (Mejor Canción Original)
- Best Sound Design (Mejor Sonido)
- Best Art Direction (Mejor Dirección de Arte)
- Best Costume Design (Mejor Diseño de Vestuario)
- Best Makeup (Mejor Maquillaje)
- Best Short Film (Mejor Cortometraje)
- Best Animated Film (Mejor película de Animación)
- Lifetime Award (Premio a Toda una Vida)
- Audience Award (Premio del público)

== Ceremonies ==
Year	Edition	Date	Place	Categories	Ref.
2010	I	21 October	Jorge Eliécer Gaitán Theatre, Bogotá	12	
2012	II	22 November	Jorge Tadeo Lozano University, Bogotá	16	
2013	III	30 November	Teatro Mayor Julio Mario Santo Domingo, Bogotá	16	
2015	IV	4 December	Hotel Tequendama, Bogotá	15	
2016	V	18 November	Faenza Theatre, Bogotá	16	
2017	VI	14 December	Faenza Theatre, Bogotá	16	
2018	VII	17 November	Ágora Bogotá Convention Center, Bogotá	18	
2019	VIII	9 November	Plaza Mayor, Medellín	18	
2021	IX	6 December	Cinemateca Distrital, Bogotá	18	
2022	X	5 November	Jorge Eliécer Gaitán Theatre, Bogotá	19	
2023	XI	5 November	Delia Zapata Olivella National Arts Center, Bogotá	20	
2024	XII	3 November	Santander Theatre, Bucaramanga	21	
2025	XIII	2 November	Metropolitan Theatre, Medellín	20 + 4	
2026	XIV	25 October	Cali	25	
