= Faenza Theatre =

Theatre in Bogotá, Colombia

Faenza theatre
- Teatro Faenza
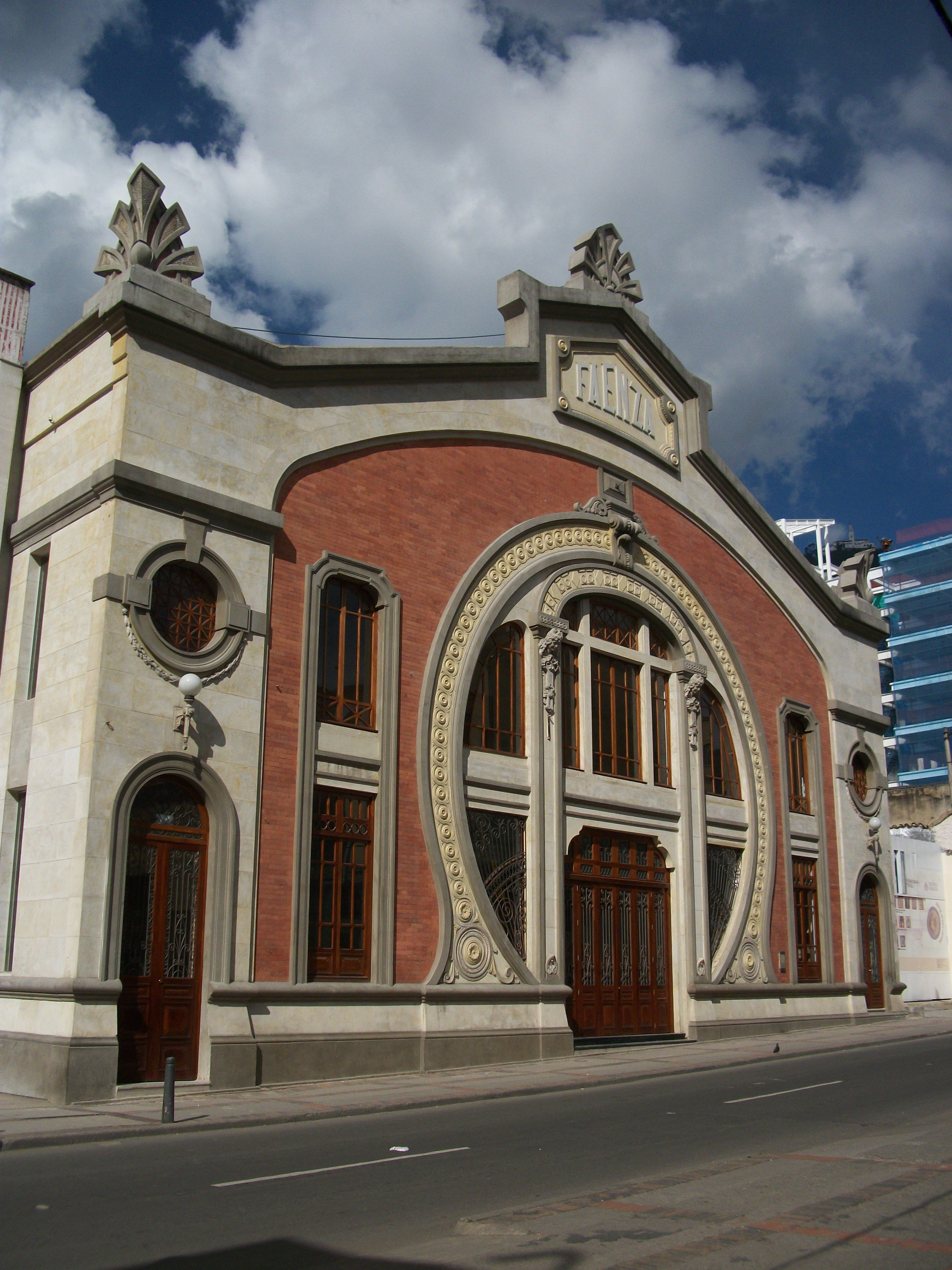
- The entrance to the theatre

General information
- Architectural style: Art Nouveau
- Town or city: Bogotá
- Country: Colombia
- Coordinates: 4°35′51″N 74°04′18″W
- Opened: 3 April 1924
- Renovated: 2004 to 2007

Website
- http://www.teatrofaenza.com.co

The Faenza theatre (Spanish: Teatro Faenza) is the oldest movie theatre in Bogotá, Colombia. It was opened on the site of a former ceramic (Spanish: faenza) factory on 3 April 1924 with the screening of a French film. The theatre was listed as a National Monument of Colombia on 11 August 1975 under decree 1584.

The building is an example of Art Nouveau architecture. After falling into disrepair, the theatre was restored from 2004 to 2007.
