= X500 (film) =

2016 drama film directed by Juan Andrés Arango

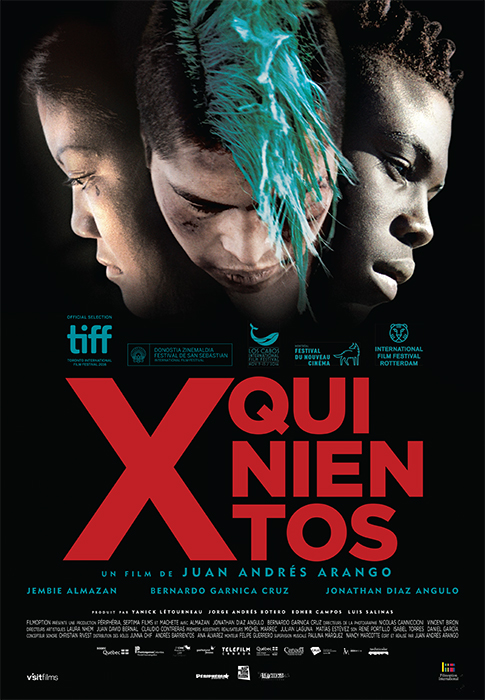
- Directed by: Juan Andrés Arango
- Written by: Juan Andrés Arango
- Produced by: Yanick Létourneau; Jorge Andrés Botero; Edher Campos
- Starring: Jembie Almazan; Bernardo Garnica Cruz; Jonathan Diaz Angulo
- Cinematography: Nicolas Canniccioni
- Edited by: Felipe Guerrero
- Release date: 10 September 2016 (TIFF)
- Running time: 104 minutes
- Countries: Canada; Colombia; Mexico
- Languages: English; French; Spanish; Tagalog; Mazahua

X500 (Spanish: X Quinientos) is a 2016 drama film directed by Juan Andrés Arango. An international co-production between Canada, Colombia and Mexico, the film premiered in the Contemporary World Cinema strand at the 2016 Toronto International Film Festival.

The film tells the thematically interrelated but dramatically separate stories of three young adults, one each in Canada, Colombia and Mexico, who are each struggling to adapt to a new and unfamiliar living situation. The film features dialogue in English, French, Spanish, Tagalog and Mazahua.

The film stars Jembie Almazan as Maria, Bernardo Garnica Cruz as David and Jonathan Diaz Angulo as Alex.
