= Juan Sebastián Mesa =

Colombian filmmaker

Juan Sebastián Mesa is a Colombian filmmaker. He directed Los Nadie (2016) and Rust (2021). He has also produced short films Kalashikov (2013) and Tierra Mojada (2017).
