= Colombian Academy of Cinematography Arts and Sciences =

Industry association in Colombia

- Academia Colombiana de Artes y Ciencias Cinematográficas
- Formation: December 2009
- Type: Professional association
- Headquarters: Bogotá
- Region served: Colombia
- Official language: Spanish
- President: Cristina Umaña
- Website: www.academiacolcine.com

The Colombian Academy of Cinematographic Arts and Sciences (Spanish: Academia Colombiana de Artes y Ciencias Cinematográficas - ACACC) is an industry association in Colombia founded in 2009. Each year the academy present the Macondo Awards to award achievements in the film industry. The academy also selects Colombian films to represent the country in other annual awards and festivals, such as the Academy Awards.

== History ==
The Colombian Academy of Cinematographic Arts and Sciences was founded in December 2009. Currently, there are 450 members from thirteen categories: production, directing, acting, screenwriting, editing, cinematography, art direction, music, costume design, sound design, production design, makeup and visual effects. The ACACC is supported by the Directorate of Film of the Ministry of Culture and Proimágenes Colombia.

== See also ==
- Macondo Awards
