= Laura Montoya =

Colombian catholic saint

Saint Laura Montoya
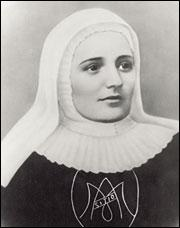
- Born: 26 May 1874; Jericó, Antioquía, Colombia
- Died: 21 October 1949 (aged 75); Belencito, Medellín, Antioquía, Colombia
- Venerated in: Roman Catholic Church
- Beatified: 25 April 2004, Saint Peter's Square, Vatican City by Pope John Paul II
- Canonized: 12 May 2013, Saint Peter's Square, Vatican City by Pope Francis
- Feast: 21 October

Laura Montoya, in full María Laura de Jesús Montoya Upegui (26 May 1874 – 21 October 1949), religious name Laura of Saint Catherine of Siena, was a Colombian Roman Catholic religious sister and the founder of the Congregation of the Missionary Sisters of the Immaculate Virgin Mary and Saint Catherine of Siena (1914). She was well known for her work with Indigenous peoples and for acting as a strong role model for South American girls.

Pope John Paul II beatified her in 2004 and Pope Francis canonized her as a saint on 12 May 2013. Montoya is the first Colombian to be made a saint.

== Life ==
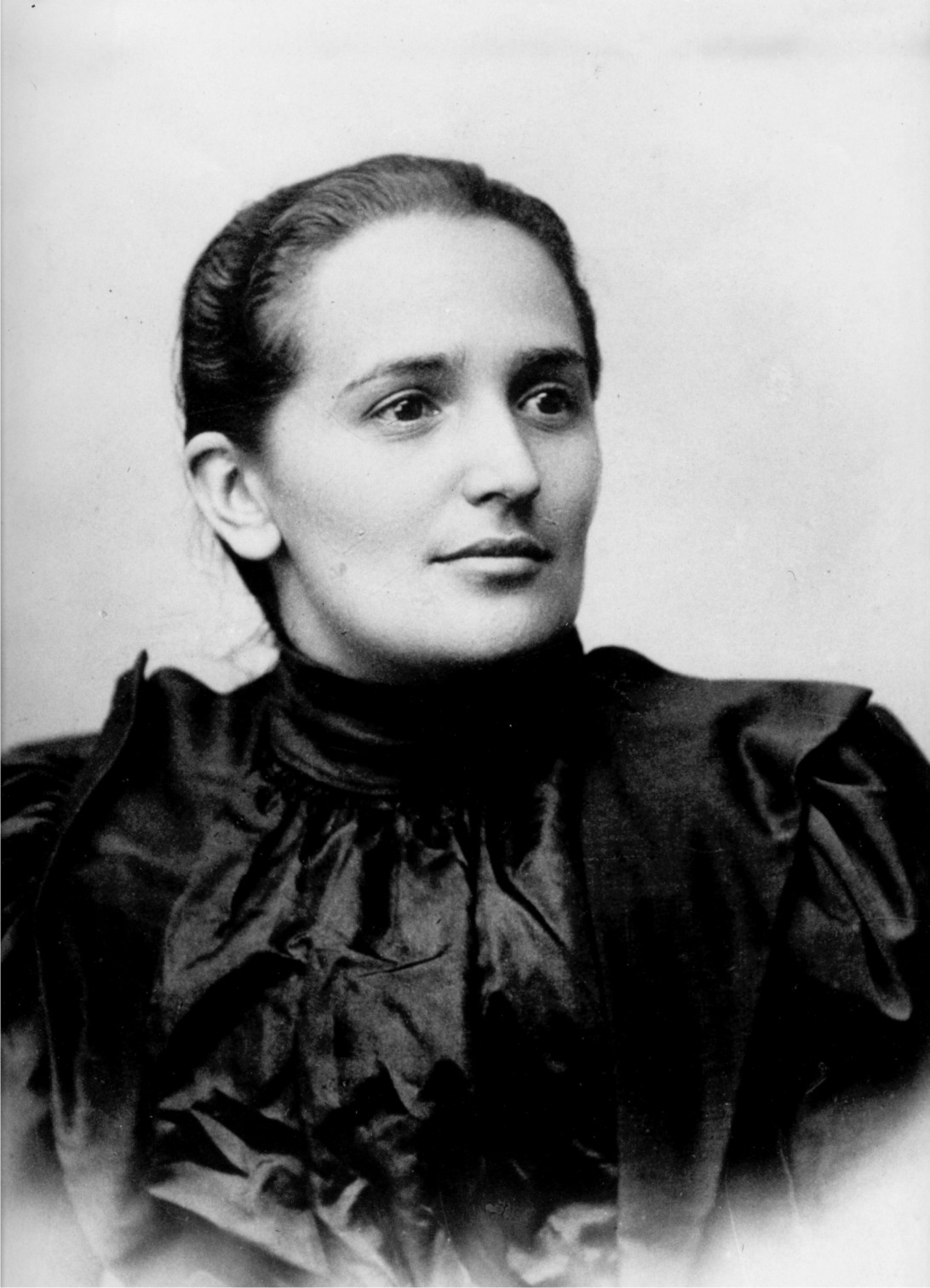
Saint Laura as a teacher

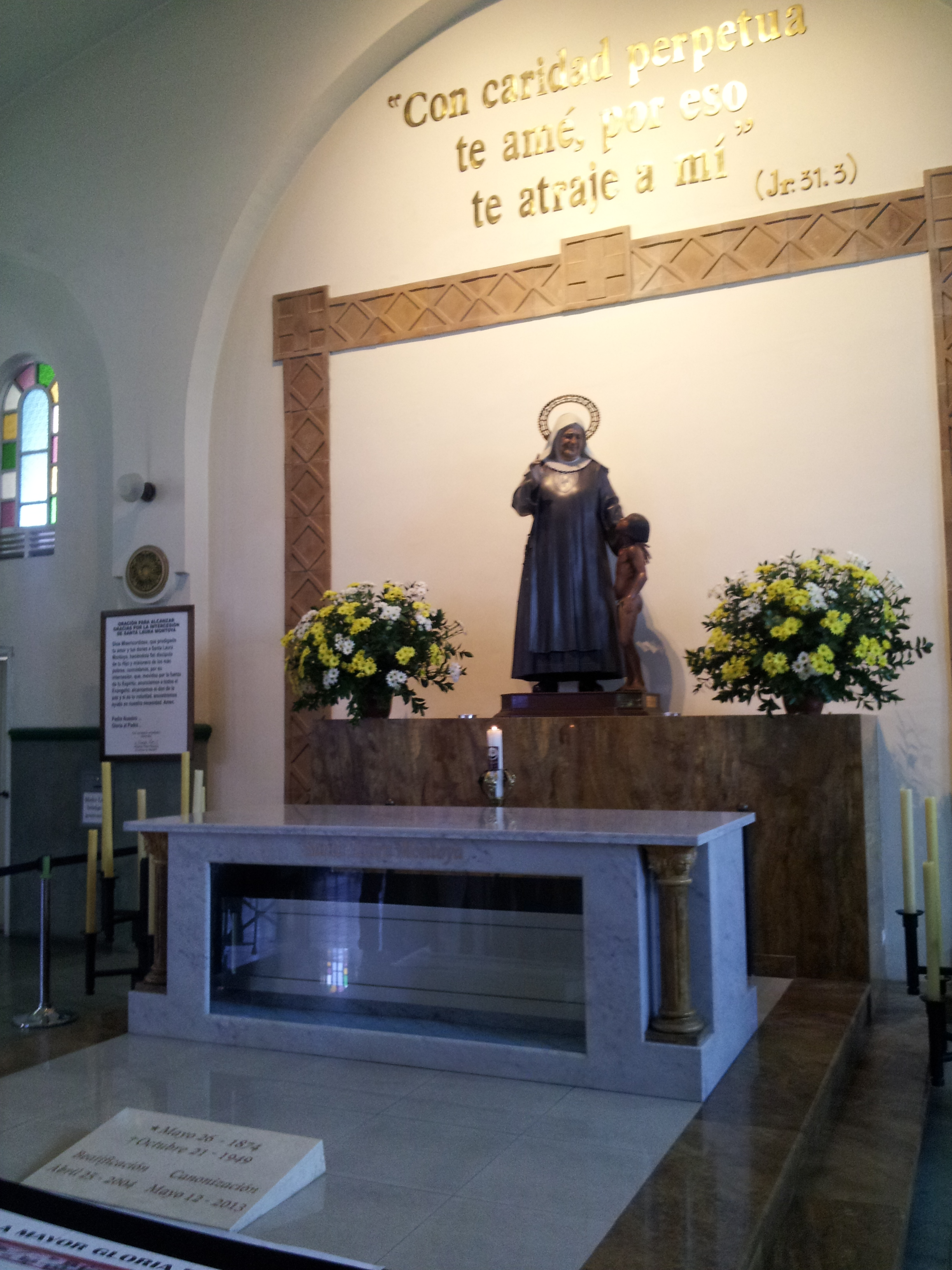
Sanctuary with her tomb in Medellín

María Laura de Jesús Montoya Upegui was born on 26 May 1874 in Jericó in the United States of Colombia as the second of three children to Juan de la Cruz Montoya and Dolores Upegui; she was baptized that same day. Her siblings were older sister Carmelina and younger brother Juan de la Cruz; a maternal cousin was Luisa Upegui. During the Colombian Civil War of 1876 her father was killed and the household left poor as a result of this. Therefore she was sent to live with her maternal grandmother; her grandfather was Lucio Upegui.

In 1881 the precarious economic condition saw her sent to an orphanage that her maternal aunt María de Jesús Upegui, a religious sister, managed. This aunt in 1890 enrolled her at "Normale de Institutoras" of Medellín to receive training to become a school teacher as a means of having an income to support the financial difficulties her mother faced. Montoya was educated at the Escuela de Espíritu Santo in Amalfi and then in Medellín. In 1886 she went to live on a farm to care for an ill aunt and it was there that her desire to become a religious began. She graduated as a teacher in 1893.

In 1908 she began working with the natives in the Uraba and Sarare regions where she founded the "Works of the Indians". Montoya wanted to become a Discalced Carmelite, but felt growing within her the desire to spread the Gospel to those who had never met Jesus Christ. Montoya wanted to eliminate the existing racial discrimination and to sacrifice herself in order to bring them Christ's love and teachings.

On 14 May 1914, she started the Congregation of Missionary Sisters of the Immaculate Virgin Mary and Saint Catherine of Siena. She left Medellín with four other women and went to Dabeiba to live among the native Indians. Even though this new congregation had the support of the Bishop of Santa Fe de Antioquia it was criticized even within Christian groups.

Montoya died after a prolonged illness on 21 October 1949 in Medellín, in Colombia. The last nine years of her life were lived in a wheelchair due to this. The congregation operates in a total of nineteen countries throughout the Americas as well as in Africa and Europe at present.

== Sainthood ==
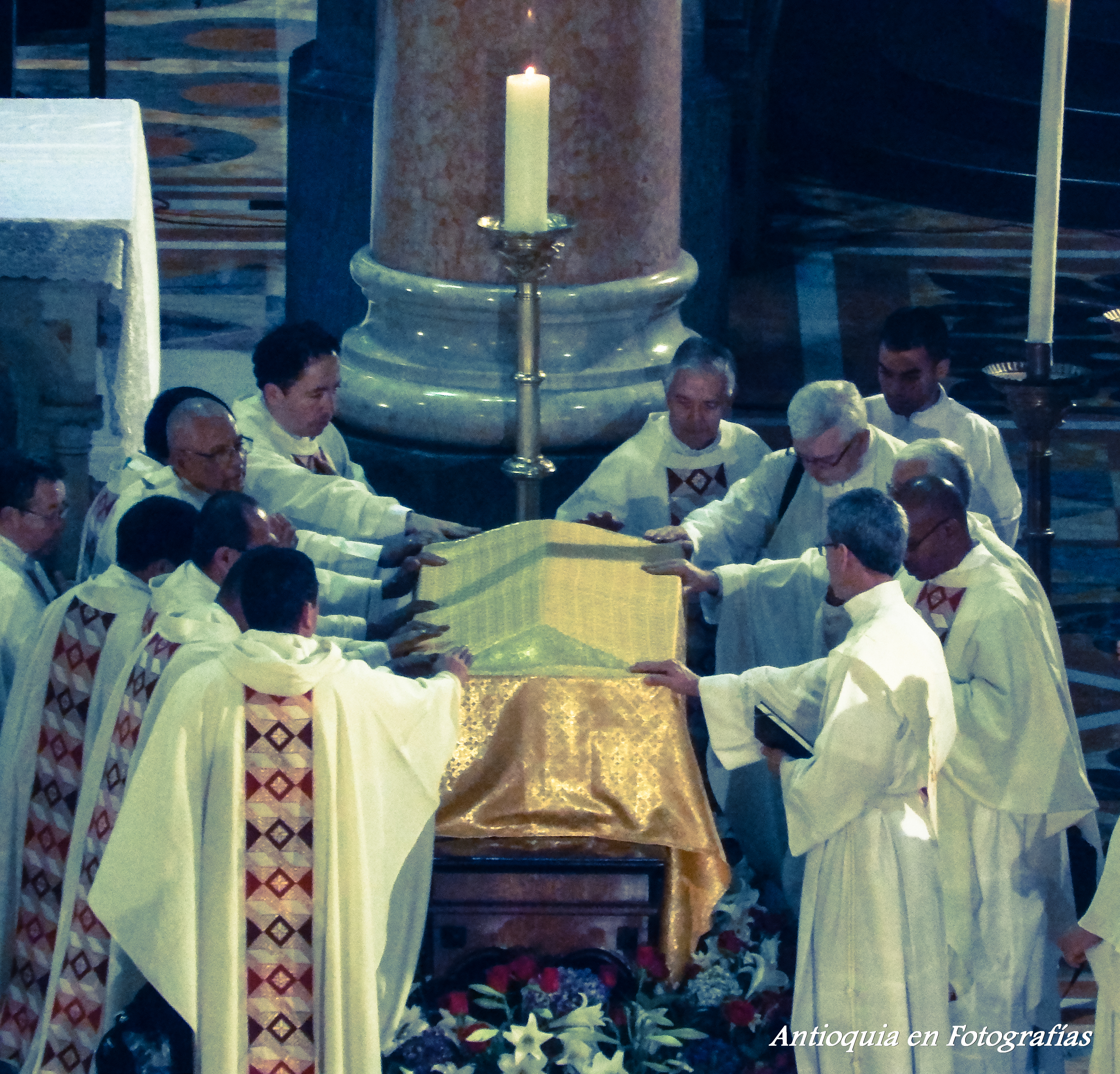
Priests venerating her relics in the Metropolitan Cathedral of Medellín

The process for Montoya's beatification lasted 16 August 1976 to 19 December 1977. Montoya was titled as a Servant of God under Pope Paul VI on 5 April 1976 with the formal introduction of the cause. Montoya became titled as Venerable on 22 January 1991 after Pope John Paul II confirmed that the late religious led a model life of heroic virtue.

The miracle attributed to Montoya's intercession was approved by John Paul II on 7 July 2003. He beatified her on 25 April 2004 in Saint Peter's Square. The beatification miracle involved the 1994 cure of a woman (aged 86) from uterine cancer.

Pope Benedict XVI approved a second miracle on 20 December 2012 and scheduled her canonization at a consistory on 11 February 2013 – which included the pontiff's resignation. The retired pope's successor Pope Francis canonized her on 12 May 2013. The canonization miracle involves the healing of Doctor Carlos Eduardo Restrepo who was suffering from lupus as well as kidney damage and muscular degeneration. The doctor was said to be cured after requesting the intercession of the then-beatified Montoya. The postulator at the time of Montoya's canonization was Silvia Mónica Correale.

== See also ==
- List of Colombian saints
