= Cromos =

Colombian magazine

- Front cover of issue 04786 of Cromos featuring Natalia Navarro.
- Director: Fidel Cano Correa
- Editor-in-chief: Fernando Gómez Garzón
- Frequency: Weekly
- Founder: Miguel Santiago Valencia; Abelardo Arboleda Restrepo
- First issue: 16 January 1916
- Company: Inversiones Cromos S.A.S.
- Country: Colombia
- Based in: Bogotá, D.C.
- Language: Spanish
- Website: www.cromos.com.co
- ISSN: 0011-1708
- OCLC: 7682578

Cromos is a Colombian variety and photojournalism magazine, known for widely covering the Miss Colombia pageant on editions called Mini Cromos. The magazine was founded in 1916 by Miguel Santiago Valencia and Abelardo Arboleda, both from the Colombian city of Popayán. It is published on a weekly basis and has its headquarters in Bogotá, D.C.

Cromos is part of the Library of Congress September 11 Web Archive and preserves the web expressions of individuals, groups, the press, and institutions in the United States and from around the world in the aftermath of the attacks in the US on September 11, 2001.

Cromos has received important journalism awards, among them: Premio Iberoamericano de Periodismo Don Quijote 2006, CPB and Simón Bolívar Awards, among others.

== See also ==
- El Espectador
