= Cinema of Colombia =

- Garras de oro (1926)
- No. of screens: 815 (2013)
  - Per capita: 1.9 per 100,000 (2013)
- Main distributors: Cine Colombia 37.9% United International Pictures 34.8% IACSA 16.6%

Produced feature films (2013)
- Total: 26

Number of admissions (2013)
- Total: 43,817,971
- National films: 2,163,964 (4.9%)

Gross box office (2013)
- Total: COP 353 billion
- National films: COP 15.5 billion (4.4%)

Cinema of Colombia refers to film productions made in Colombia, or considered Colombian for other reasons. Colombian cinema, like any national cinema, is a historical process with industrial and artistic aspects.

Historically, Colombian cinema has not been profitable as an industry, which has prevented continuing production and employing filmmakers and technicians. During the first decades of the 20th century, there were some companies that attempted to maintain a constant level of production, but the lack of economic support and strong foreign competition ended up ruining the initiatives. In the 1980s, the newly created state-run Cinematographic Development Company (Compañía de Fomento Cinematográfico FOCINE) allowed some productions to be carried out. However, the company had to be liquidated in the early 1990s.

In 1997 the Colombian Congress approved Law 397 of Article 46, or the General Law of Culture, with the purpose of supporting the development of the Colombian film industry by creating a film promotion mixed fund called Corporación PROIMAGENES en Movimiento (PROIMAGES in Motion Corporation). Starting in 2003, there has been growing cinematographic activity, thanks to the Cinema Law that allowed initiatives around cinematographic activity to be reborn in the country, through the creation of the Cinematographic Development Fund (FDC).

== History ==
Poster of a Lumiere Brothers movie

The history of Colombian cinema began in 1897 when the first Cinématographe arrived in the country, two years after the invention of cinematography by Auguste and Louis Lumière in Paris. The cinématographe was first demonstrated in the port city of Colón (in what is today Panama but was then part of Colombia), Barranquilla, Bucaramanga and later arrived to the capital city of Bogotá. In August of that same year the cinématographe was presented in the Municipal Theater (which was later demolished).

=== First years ===
Soon after the introduction of the cinématographe in Colombia, the country entered a civil war known as the Thousand Days' War, causing the suspension of all film production. The first films usually portrayed nature and moments from everyday Colombian life. The majority of these films were led by the Di Domenico brothers who owned the Salón Olympia in Bogotá. The Di Domenico brothers also produced the first documentary film in Colombia called El drama del quince de Octubre (The Drama of October 15), which was intended to celebrate the centenary of the Battle of Boyacá, and also narrated the assassination of General Rafael Uribe Uribe, provoking controversy upon its release.

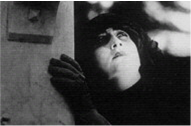
Photogram of the film Bajo el Cielo Antioqueño (1924–1925)

=== Silent films ===
La tragedia del silencio (1924, fragment).

During the early years of Colombian cinema, producers almost exclusively portrayed nature and everyday life in their films until 1922, when the first narrative fiction film appeared, titled María (of which no complete copies remain). The film was directed by Máximo Calvo Olmedo, a Spanish immigrant who worked as a film distributor in Panama. He was hired to travel to the city of Cali, where he would direct and manage the film's photography. The film was based on Jorge Isaacs' novel María.

Another pioneer of Colombian cinema was Arturo Acevedo Vallarino, a producer and theater director from Antioquia who lived in Bogotá. After the introduction of foreign films and the fascination they caused in Colombia, theaters no longer were as profitable as they once were, so Acevedo decided to found a film production company called Acevedo e Hijos (Acevedo and Sons). Acevedo and Sons was the longest lasting production company in Colombia, and were in business from 1923 to 1946– the only one to survive the Great Depression of the 1930s. Acevedo and Sons produced the films La tragedia del silencio (The Tragedy of Silence) in 1924 and Bajo el Cielo Antioqueño (Under the Sky of Antioquia) in 1928. Under the Sky of Antioquia was financed by local tycoon Gonzalo Mejía. The film was criticized for being elitist, but received an unexpectedly positive reception from the moviegoing public. Films in Colombia continued to be largely based on themes of nature, folklore, and nationalism, with some exceptions in literary adaptations. In 1926 the film Garras de oro: The Dawn of Justice (Claws of Gold; the title is half Spanish and English) was released. It is distinctive for being based on a political issue, the separation of Panama from Colombia, and for criticizing the role of the United States in the conflict, both bold firsts in Colombian cinema.

=== 1930s crisis ===
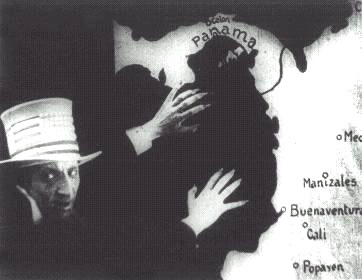
Photogram of the film: Garras de oro (1926)

In 1928, the Colombian company Cine Colombia acquired the Di Domenico film studios and began focusing on the distribution of international films due to their strong commercial appeal. At the time, Colombian audiences showed a clear preference for foreign productions over domestic ones. As a result, between 1928 and 1940, only one feature-length sound film was produced in Colombia: Al son de las guitarras (To the Rhythm of the Guitars), directed by Alberto Santa, which was never screened in theaters. Colombians were more interested in Hollywood films. Colombian film industry enthusiasts did not have the money, technology or preparation needed to develop a national cinema. While Colombian movies were still silent, the international industry was already exploding with color and sound films, thus putting Colombian cinema at a considerable disadvantage.

In the 1940s a businessman from Bogotá named Oswaldo Duperly founded Ducrane Films, and produced numerous films, despite facing strong competition from Argentine and Mexican cinema, which after 1931 became the third most preferred choice of Colombians. The only production company that survived during this period was Acevedo and Sons, until it closed in 1945.

During the 1950s Gabriel García Márquez and Enrique Grau attempted to restart the industry. In 1954 the two artists, a writer and a painter respectively, created the surrealistic short film La langosta azul (The Blue Lobster). García Márquez continued in the industry as a scriptwriter while Grau continued painting.

=== 'Pornomiseria' cinema ===
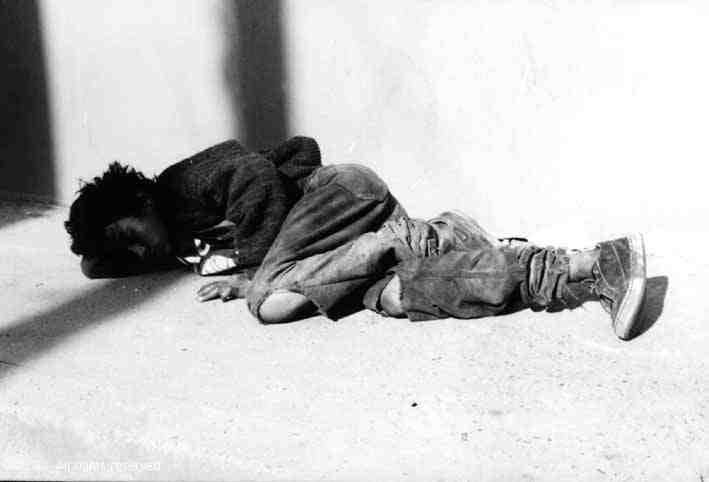
Child on the street, one common scene from 1970s "pornomiseria"

Pornomiseria cinema was the term used by Colombian critics in the 1970s for certain films that exploited poverty and human misery, with the goals of making money and having their directors achieve international recognition. The term "pornomiseria" was coined by the Argentine director Luis Puenzo to criticize over-representation of marginalized lives in Latin American cinema. (See also Misery porn or Poverty porn for parallel phenomena.)

One of the most criticized examples was Gamín (1978) by Ciro Durán, a documentary about children living on the streets. The film went beyond simply depicting urban poverty by staging recreated scenes of, for example, children stealing car radios. Among the loudest critics were the filmmakers Carlos Mayolo and Luis Ospina, leaders of the Grupo de Cali. Among other films they made was the mockumentary The Vampires of Poverty (1977), a satire of pornomiseria cinema. The filmmaker Víctor Gaviria stood out for his social films that scandalized some sectors of public opinion for showing the reality of the lives of street children, as was the case with the award-winning film La vendedora de rosas (The Rose Seller, 1998).

=== Cinematic Development Company (FOCINE) ===
On July 28, 1978, the Compañía de Fomento Cinematográfico (FOCINE) (Cinematic Development Company) was established to administer the Cinematic Development Fund, which had been created a year before, in 1977. FOCINE was first assigned to the Colombian Ministry of Communications, which in a period of ten years supported 29 films and a number of short films and documentaries. Corruption in the administration led to the closing of FOCINE in 1993. During this period, Carlos Mayolo's work transcended and introduced new forms of film-making in Colombian cinema, renewing the aesthetics and visual language of national cinema. Gustavo Nieto Roa helped to develop comedies influenced by Mexican cinema.

During the last decade of the 20th century, the Colombian government liquidated FOCINE, forcing film makers to co-produce films with other countries, mainly from Europe and private capital investors. Despite this, some important productions were developed, such as La estrategia del caracol (The Snail's Strategy) by Sergio Cabrera, which won numerous international prizes and managed to revive national interest in national films. Also, Jorge Alí Triana won many prizes and much recognition from Bolívar soy yo (I Am Bolívar, 2002).

=== Cinema Law ===
In 2003, the Colombian government passed Law 814 of 2003, also known as the Cinema Law, which standardized help for local film production. The funds were collected through taxes from distributors, exhibitors and film producers. The goal was to support film producers, short films documentaries and public projects. Funds collected were administered by the PROIMAGENES Cinematographic Production Mixed Fund.

Numerous films were sponsored by the government and were successful at the local box office such as Soñar no Cuesta Nada (Dreaming Costs Nothing) by Rodrigo Triana, with 1,200,000 spectators, an unprecedented attendance at the time. Another was the film El colombian dream (the last word being in English to highlight a play on the concept of the "American Dream") by Felipe Aljure, which achieved technical innovations and employed a narrative never before seen in Colombian cinema. Some critics considered this period as the "renaissance of Colombian cinema" and as the best possibility in its entire history of having a well-established industry.

During the second term of President Álvaro Uribe Vélez, the government presented a tax reform to cut funding to the Law of Cinema. The president was criticized for this, but the minister of Culture, Elvira Cuervo de Jaramillo, lobbied in the Ministry of Finance to impede this law from affecting the financial resources destined to Colombian cinema. The Minister of Finance agreed to protect the benefits for the film industry.

== International projection ==
Despite Colombian cinema having had a very small presence in international events, some documentaries during the 1970s had relative success, such as "Chircales" (1972) by Marta Rodríguez and Jorge Silva, which won international prizes and recognition.

During the 1990s Silva gained notoriety with the film La estrategia del caracol (The Strategy of the Snail, 1993) and Víctor Gaviria did so with his films Rodrigo D: No futuro (Rodrigo D: No future, 1990) and La vendedora de rosas (The Rose Seller,1998), which was nominated for a Palme d'Or at the Cannes Film Festival.

In the 2000s, actress Catalina Sandino Moreno was nominated for an Academy Award for her acting in the Colombian-American production Maria Full of Grace. Moreno was also nominated for best female acting at the Berlin International Film Festival in 2004 and won, sharing it with actress Charlize Theron.

== Documentary films ==
Documentary productions in Colombia have varied in quality. Nevertheless, they haven't been widely distributed due to barriers that the film industry imposes regarding the exhibition and distribution of material. Viewers interested in focusing on these audiovisual materials are rare.

During the 1970s, in the city of Cali, there was a great boom, not only in film but in the arts in general. At that time the Grupo de Cali was formed, which would include Carlos Mayolo, Luis Ospina, Andrés Caicedo, Oscar Campo and other documentarists and directors who portrayed a particular sense of place and reality through their work. At the same time, documentarists like Marta Rodríguez and Jorge Silva produced a seemingly unending array of documentaries that discussed anthropology, portraying forms of life and realities unknown to many.

== Animated film ==
The development of animated film in Colombia, as in the rest of Latin America, has been slow and irregular, and it is only in recent years that animation has begun to gain importance. The first initiatives in the country were around the 1970s, especially in television commercial production. Nonetheless, it was at the end of the past decade that Fernando Laverde, considered the pioneer of stop motion animation in Colombia, and used experimental methods and limited resources to create short animated pieces that received national and international recognition. Bogota native Carlos Santa explored the world of animated film as fine arts and is considered the father of experimental animation in Colombia. In 1988 with the support of FOCINE, Santa released his film El pasajero de la noche (The Passenger of the Night) and in 1994 La selva oscura (The Dark Jungle) at the Caracas Film Festival. Both films received critical recognition for their artistic and narrative merits. In 2010, Carlos Santa completed his first feature-length animated film Los Extraños Presagios de León Prozak (The Mysterious Presages of León Prozak) which premiered at the Annecy International Animated Film Festival. In the 2000s there was renewed activity in Colombian animation, thanks to the interest of a new generation in the genre and the emergence of new technology. In 2003 the animated full-length film Bolivar the Hero was released, and the LOOP Animation and Video Games Festival was born, where Colombian and Latin American animators' work was encouraged and rewarded.

== Film festivals ==
Many film festivals take place in Colombia, but arguably the two most important are the Cartagena Film Festival, functioning every year since 1960, and the Bogotá Film Festival, functioning every year since 1984, both presenting Latin American and Spanish movies.

=== Other competitions ===
Asides from both international festivals, there are year-round meetings, expositions and festivals that gather audiences and award local film makers. The most notable are as follows:

- Cien miradas, un país: "A Hundred Eyes, A Country", a film festival that takes place every year in Colombia and in several European cities. The event is organized by the Foundation for the Development of Audiovisual Arts or "Fundaudiovisuales."
- Eurocine: A competition held every year since 1995, in which European films are shown that aren't available through commercial distribution. The event is organized by the Bogotá office of the Goethe-Institut, the European commission's delegation in the Cinemateca distrital de Bogotá.
- Festival de cine francés (French Film Festival): An exhibit of the best of French cinema held every year in September since 2001, and is backed by the French embassy in Bogotá, Medellín, Cali and Barranquilla. It includes conferences, workshops and roundtables.
- Semana de Cine Colombiano, Sí Futuro (Colombian Film Week, Yes Future): Stemmed from the growth in Colombian film making after the passing of the Cinema Law. It began in 2006 as an exposure to Colombian cinema and began awarding noteworthy films, filmmakers and actors by an international jury.
- Imaginatón: A bi-annual film making and film screening marathon, where professionals and amateurs of all ages and nationalities are invited to make a filminuto in plano secuencia ("shot in sequence"). The best films are selected and awarded by a specialized jury. The event is organized by Black Velvet Laboratories, a company dedicated to the field of "audiovisual entertainment analysis and development".
- Festival de Cine y Video de Santa Fe de Antioquia (Santa Fe de Antioquia Film and Video Festival): A festival that has been taking place since March 2000 by the Santa Fe de Antioquia Film and Video Corporation and organized by film maker Víctor Gaviria, with the stated aim of promoting film making and forming an audience in the Antioquia region. However, film makers from all over the country can participate.
- MUDA Colombia: The Colombia University Audiovisuals Exhibit (MUDA, its abbreviation in Spanish) is an annual contest where the best of university work receives awards, as well as pedagogical techniques proposed by film professors all over the country.
- In Vitro Visual: One of the best established short-film-related events in Colombia, this event presents Colombian shorts on Tuesdays and foreign ones on Thursdays. Films are chosen through an annual contest presided by a jury of veteran film makers. At the end of the event, awards and official statuettes (Santa Lucia) are distributed, as well as cash prizes. This event is organized by Black Velvet Laboratories and In Vitro Producciones.
- LOOP, Festival Latinoamericano de Animación & Videojuegos (Latin American Animation and Video Game Festival): An animation festival emphasizing digital work that seeks to motivate young artists. The festival's website has developed into a community which encourages learning and sharing work.
- CineToro Film Festival: An emerging event dedicated to promoting experimental and independent films. It's an annual festival and has gained a lot of attention for having many rare film showings and remarkable international guests.

== Shows and distribution ==
In Colombia there are five major commercial movie theatre chains: Cine Colombia, Cinemark, Cinépolis, Procinal and Royal Films. There are also many independent movie theaters, such as the Cinemateca Distrital de Bogotá and Los Acevedos in the Museo de Arte Moderno de Bogotá.

=== Openings in Colombia ===
Year	Box office openings from the Colombian film industry	Foreign box office openings	Total box office openings	Percentage of Colombian box office openings
1993	2	274	276	0.72%
1994	1	267	268	0.37%
1995	2	249	251	0.80%
1996	3	270	273	1.10%
1997	1	251	252	0.40%
1998	6	237	243	2.47%
1999	3	NA	NA	NA
2000	4	200	204	1.96%
2001	7	196	203	3.45%
2002	8	176	180	2.22%
2003	5	170	175	2.86%
2004	8	159	167	4.79%
2005	8	156	164	4.88%
2006	8	154	162	4.94%
2007	12	189	198	6.06%
2008	13	200	213	6.1%
2009	12	202	214	5.6%
2010	10	196	206	4.9%
2011	18	188	206	8.70%
2012	22	191	213	10.8%
2013	17	227	244	7.07%
2014	20	274	284	7.04%
2015	37	332	369	10.02%

== Highest-grossing Colombian films ==
Colombian highest-grossing films as of 2023
Rank	Title	Gross	Year
1	The 33	$12.19M	2015
2	Maria Full of Grace	$6.52M	2004
3	Love in the Time of Cholera	$4.61M	2007
4	Embrace of the Serpent	$1.33M	2015
5	Our Lady of the Assassins	$0.53M	2000
6	Birds of Passage	$0.51M	2018
7	Esmeraldero	$0.10M	2003
8	Gabo: The Creation of Gabriel Garcia Marquez	$0.01M	2015
9	Rabia	$0.01M	2009
10	Bad Lucky Goat	$0.01M	2017

== Box office number-ones ==
- List of 2016 box office number-one films in Colombia
- List of 2017 box office number-one films in Colombia
- List of 2018 box office number-one films in Colombia
- List of 2019 box office number-one films in Colombia
- List of 2020 box office number-one films in Colombia
- List of 2021 box office number-one films in Colombia
- List of 2024 box office number-one films in Colombia
- List of 2025 box office number-one films in Colombia

== See also ==
- Cinema of the world
- List of Colombian films
- Cartagena Film Festival
