= María (1922 film) =

Colombian silent film in black and white

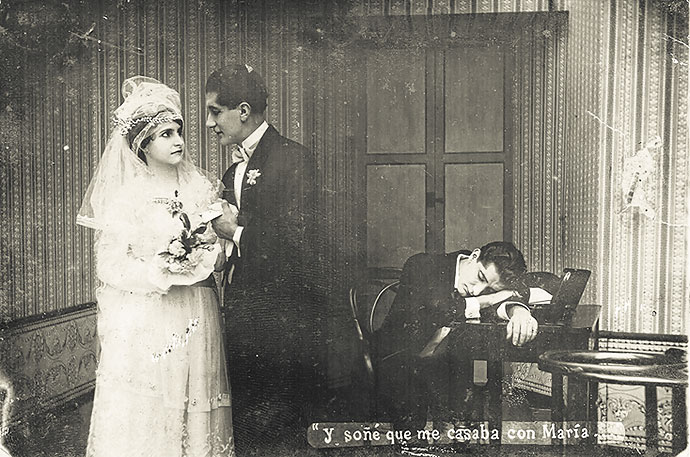
- A scene in the film, in which Efraín dreams that he is marrying María, uses superimposition to show the same character twice on screen.
- Directed by: Máximo Calvo Olmedo and Alfredo del Diestro
- Based on: the novel María by Jorge Isaacs
- Starring: Stella López Pomareda, Hernando Sinisterra, Emma Roldán
- Production company: Valley Film
- Release date: 1922
- Running time: Around 180 minutes
- Country: Colombia
- Language: Spanish

María is a 1922 Colombian silent film in black and white, directed by Máximo Calvo Olmedo and Alfredo del Diestro.

It was the first feature-length fiction film made in Colombia, and is an adaptation of the novel of the same name by Jorge Isaacs. It tells the story of the love affair between Efraín, the son of a wealthy hacienda owner, and his first cousin María. While most sources claim that the initiative to produce María came from the Franciscan priest Antonio José Posada, others indicate that the idea came from Alfredo del Diestro. Shooting began in October 1921, and took place in some of the same locations as the novel, including the hacienda El Paraíso. The feature film premiered on October 20, 1922 in Buga and Cali.

The film was at the center of what is considered the first copyright controversy in the Colombian film industry, when the Isaacs family filed a lawsuit against Valley Film, the film's production company, which the latter won. The controversy led to the film being banned by local authorities from screening in several Colombian cities, but the legal case also served as additional publicity for the film, which broke box-office records in Colombia.

It was the only Colombian film at the time to be shown in national cinemas for several years. While the film was a success domestically, it was a failure abroad. The positive reception and commercial success of María gave a boost to Colombian film production, with other producers producing some twenty films during the silent era.

Despite its importance, no copies of the film have survived; only a 25-second fragment has been preserved, along with dozens of stills. A short documentary, En busca de María, was made in 1985 by Luis Ospina and Jorge Nieto, with the aim of retracing the history of the making of María.

== Synopsis ==
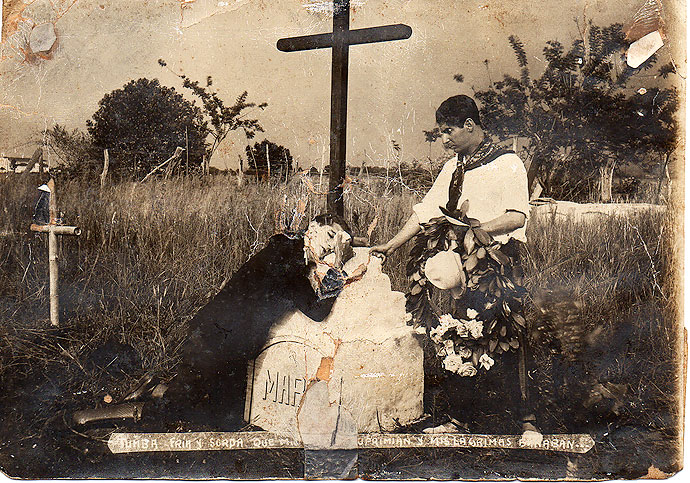
A scene from the film: Efraín weeping over María's grave.

The film is an adaptation of the novel of the same name by Jorge Isaacs, which tells the story of the love affair between Efraín and María. As only a 25-second fragment of the film remains, the adaptation cannot be sufficiently analyzed, but it is very likely that it is not very different from the literary work. Indeed, the fact that the novel is a bestseller, and therefore familiar to the public, is supposed to guarantee the film a certain success on its release.

María tells the story of the love affair between Efraín, the son of a wealthy hacienda owner in the Valle del Cauca, who is studying in Bogotá, and his first cousin María. During one of his visits to the hacienda, the young man meets María and the two fall in love. However, Efraín must leave for Europe to complete his education. During his absence, María, who is suffering from a serious illness, dies after a slow agony, still longing for Efraín. When Efraín returns to Colombia, all he is left with is his beloved's grave and a deep sorrow.

== Technical data ==
- Original title: María
- Director: Máximo Calvo Olmedo, Alfredo del Diestro
- Screenplay: Máximo Calvo Olmedo and Ricardo Nieto, based on the novel María by Jorge Isaacs
- Photography and editing: Máximo Calvo Olmedo
- Costumes: Emma Roldán
- Production: Francisco José Posada
  - Line producer: Mario Fernández de Soto
- Production company: Valley Film
- Country of origin: Colombia
- Format: black & white – silent – 35 mm
- Running time: feature film (approx. 180 minutes), cut into two parts.
- Genre: fiction, drama, romance
- Release date:
  - Colombia: October 20, 1922

== Cast ==
- Stella López Pomareda: (Note: Depending on the source, the name is spelled Stella or Estela.) María
- Hernando Sinisterra: Efraín
- Margarita López Pomareda: Emma, Efraín's sister
- Juan del Diestro: Efraín's father
- Emma Roldán: Efraín's mother
- Ernesto Ruiz: Efraín, as a child
- Jorge González: José
- Alfredo del Diestro: Salomón and Don Chomo
- Ernesto Salcedo: Braulio
- Francisco Rodríguez: Guao Angel
- Edy Salospi (pseudonym of Eduardo Salcedo Ospina): Carlos

According to Máximo Calvo, two other actresses, whose names he doesn't recall, also played in María: an Italian, Lucia, as José's wife, and Elvia, from Buga, as Tránsito.

Portraits of actors who played in the film

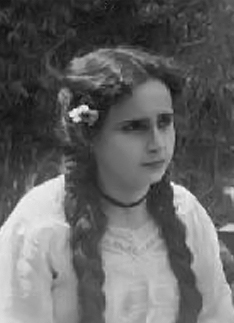
Stella López Pomareda.

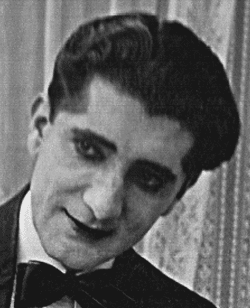
Hernando Sinisterra.

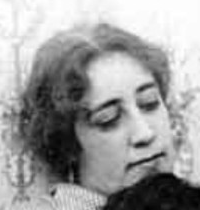
Emma Roldán.

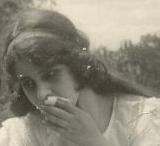
Margarita López Pomareda.

== Production ==
=== Context and reputation of the adapted novel ===
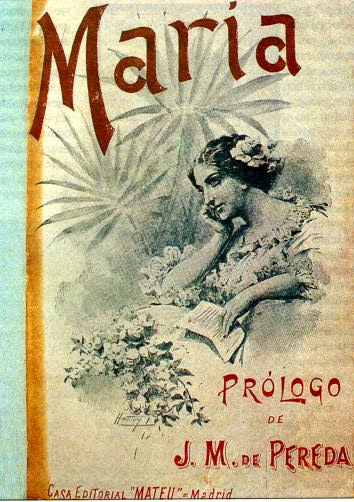
Front cover of an edition of the novel María with a prologue by José María de Pereda (1899).

In the early 1900s, Colombia's economic boom favored the development of cinema, enabling many films to be imported and several movie theaters to be built, such as Bogotá's Gran Salón Olympia, inaugurated on December 8, 1912. The Italian Di Domenico brothers moved to Bogotá in 1909, before setting up the Sociedad Industrial Cinematográfica Latinoamericana (SICLA) in 1913. This initiative is considered by Colombian film historian Luis Alfredo Álvarez to be "the first organized attempt at a national cinema". The Di Domenico brothers took advantage of the assassination of General Rafael Uribe Uribe on October 15, 1914 to release, a year later, the feature-length film El drama del 15 de octubre, considered to be the first film documentary made in Colombia. Nevertheless, the scandal that followed its release and the newspaper headlines that described it as an "immoral film" were a stinging failure for the Di Domenico brothers and for the fledgling national film industry. In fact, their avant-garde attempt to attract audiences with a sensitive topical subject brought regular film production to a screeching halt in the years that followed. In 1922, Alfredo del Diestro and Máximo Calvo Olmedo made their first feature-length Colombian fiction film, María.

For the screenplay, they chose to adapt Jorge Isaacs' only novel, María (published in 1867), which has become one of the most notable works of Romanticism in Spanish literature. Considered one of the masterpieces of Spanish-American literature, María tells several stories of impossible love, the characters belonging to different social classes or ethnic groups, notably that between Efraín and his cousin María. Right from its first edition, the book was a literary success, José Joaquín Ortiz declaring in the newspaper La Caridad, lecturas del hogar that the verses in this volume "were received with rare enthusiasm". María's success was rapid, with editions published in 1870 in Mexico, 1874 in France, 1882 in Spain and 1890 in the United States.

=== Project origins ===
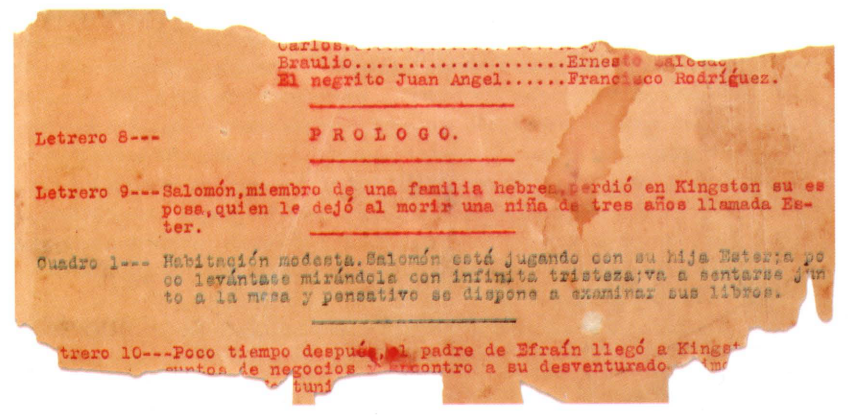
Fragment of María's original screenplay.

Explanations differ as to the origins of the project.

According to most sources, the idea for the film came from Franciscan priest Antonio José Posada, a Colombian living in Panama at the time. A theater and film buff, he had seen several films by the Spaniard Máximo Calvo Olmedo, including Guerra entre Panamá y Costa Rica. In 1921, he suggested to Calvo, then in Panama, that he make a film based on the novel María by Jorge Isaacs. To this end, he went to the director's photography studio and gave him a copy of the novel, telling him: "Read this wonderful book and study the possibility of making a film out of it". (Note: Original quote: "Lea este libro maravilloso y estudie la posibilidad de fumarlo") Despite some initial reluctance, Calvo was eventually enthused by his reading and decided to make an adaptation. On his return to Colombia, he discussed the project with Alfredo del Diestro, who was visiting the Valle del Cauca at the time. They decided to seek funding and the support of solvent members of Vallecaucana society. With the financial help of Federico López, a dentist who had returned from Jamaica, where he was Colombian ambassador, and members of the Salcedo family living in Buga, who joined the venture, the Valley Film production company was founded. Posada also sent money to Calvo for the purchase of equipment, namely 12,000 feet of negatives, 10,000 positives and special paint for the artists' faces and hands.

Other sources suggest another hypothesis. According to two sources at the time, the idea was the brainchild of Alfredo del Diestro, who approached Francesco Di Domenico with a view to bringing it to fruition, but failed to reach an agreement. Moreover, on January 22, 1924, an editor of the newspaper Mundo al Día wrote in the article "Orígenes del Cine Nacional" (Note: Literally: "The origins of national cinema".) that Alfredo del Diestro had in mind the idea of filming Jorge Isaacs' María and had tried to obtain the support of the company Di Doménico Hermanos & Compañía to carry out this project. However, despite negotiations, no agreement was reached between the two parties. Del Diestro then decided to shoot the film at the hacienda El Paraíso during one of his visits to Cali. To obtain the rights, he then went to Bogotá to meet the Isaacs family, but they demanded $40,000 for the adaptation rights, temporarily dashing hopes of seeing the project through. Shortly afterwards, according to Pedro Moreno Garzón, Secretary General of SICLA, the priest Antonio José Posada, then in Cali, had the same idea as Del Diestro and met him in Buga to work together on a film adaptation of Isaacs' novel. Alfredo del Diestro, who was looking for a director of photography, is said to have tried to secure the services of Vicente Di Domenico, but the latter, who was already busy, recommended Máximo Calvo, with whom he later teamed up to direct María.

On the other hand, there is some controversy as to the authorship of the film's screenplay. According to some sources, it was written either by Alfredo del Diestro or by Ricardo Nieto, a Vallecaucano poet. The latter hypothesis is supported by Esperancita Calvo's testimony in the documentary En busca de María (1985) by Luis Ospina and Jorge Nieto.

=== The making ===
The lead role of Efraín was initially given to Hernando Domínguez, but he was eventually passed over for Hernando Sinisterra because he had too many demands, earning him the reputation of being the first Colombian film actor. The character of María was played by Stella López Pomareda (1904–1987), one of the daughters of dentist and ambassador Federico López Pomareda. She had two things in common with the character: she was Jewish and born in Jamaica. Having arrived in Colombia at the age of 17, the actress didn't speak Spanish at the time, but this didn't harm her, as the film was silent. Her sister, Margarita López Pomareda, was also chosen to play Emma, Efraín's sister.

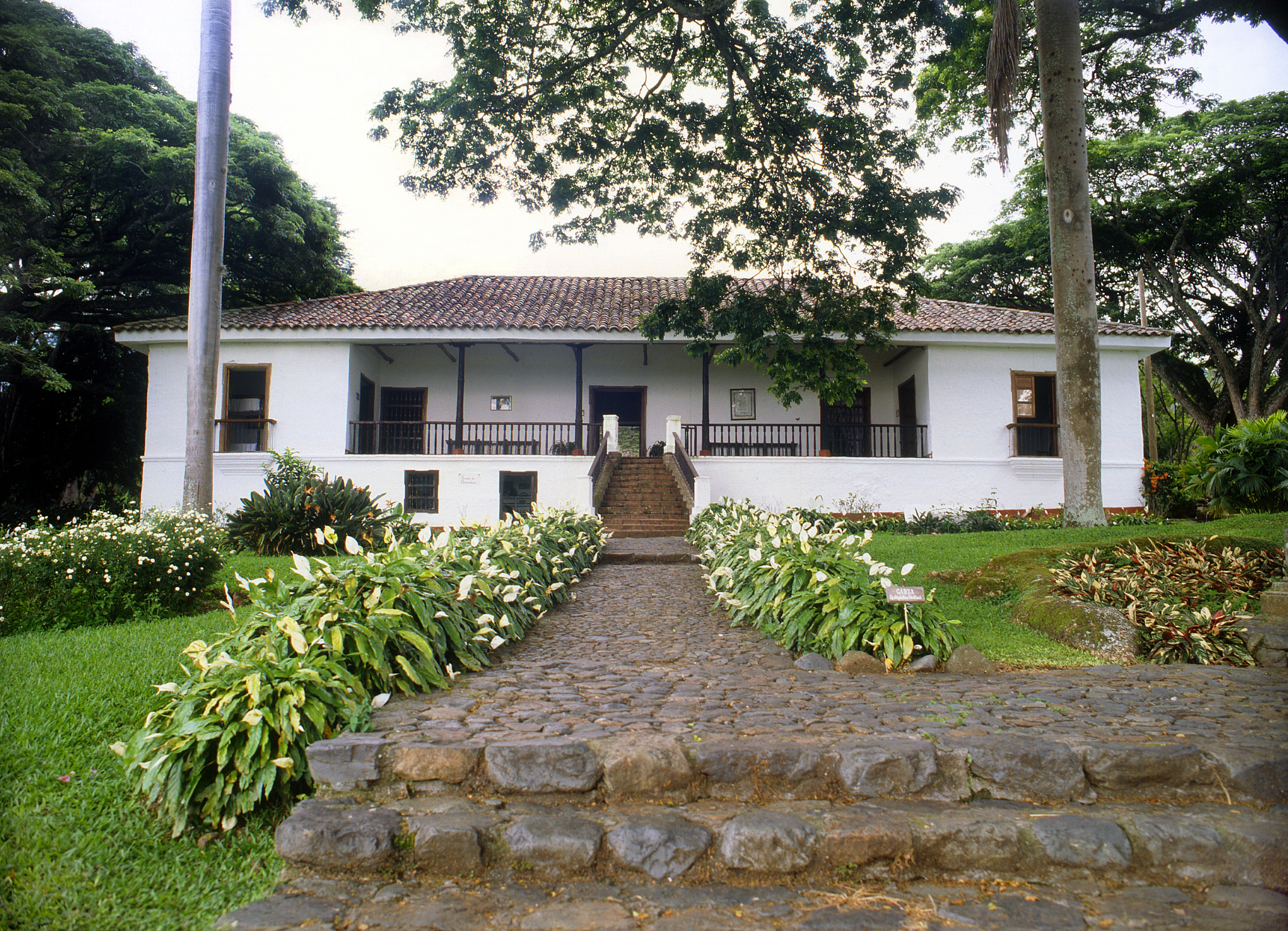
Hacienda El Paraíso, one of the filming locations.

Filming began in October 1921, at the hacienda El Paraíso, the setting for the plot of Jorge Isaacs' novel, although the interior scenes were shot in the municipality of Buga. Some scenes were shot in the same locations as those described in the novel, such as the one showing Efraín crossing the Río Amaime on horseback, a kilometer from the hacienda.

Máximo Calvo used a William and Son camera that Vincenzo Di Domenico had sold him at a good price to thank him for teaching him how to develop film. During the making of the film, he experienced a few technical problems, lacking the necessary elements to film according to his practice and at the level of his mastery of photography, which he nonetheless managed to solve easily. Calvo, who had no technical collaborators at his side, developed the film's negatives in a makeshift laboratory set up in the oratory of the El Paraíso hacienda, before making the first three positive prints in Buga. In a 1960 interview with Hernando Salcedo Silva, Calvo said that shooting María had given him the experience he needed to make a film without the help of "an endless list of technicians".

== Film's reception ==
=== Film release ===
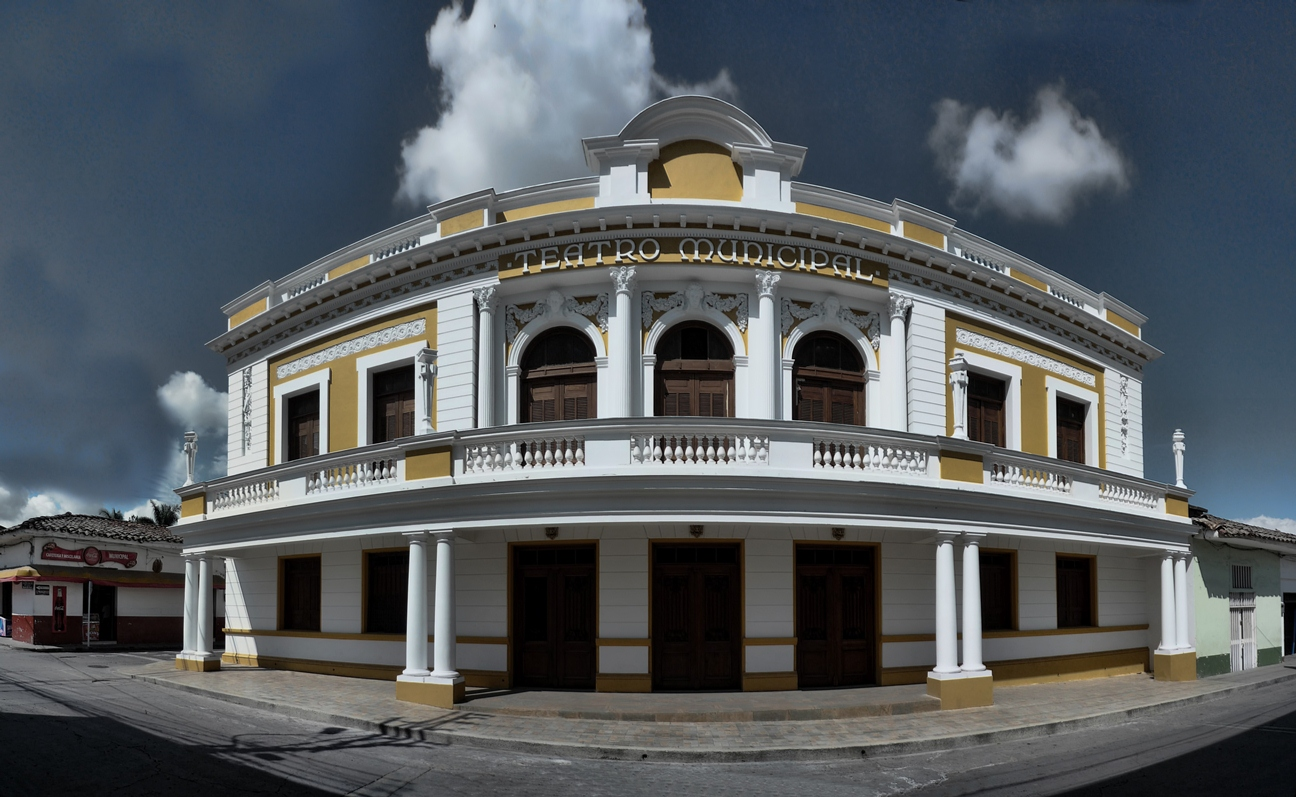
The Teatro Municipal in Buga, one of the two venues that hosted the film's first screenings.

María was shown for the first time on October 20, 1922 at private screenings at the Teatro Municipal de Buga and the Teatro Salón Moderno in Cali. In the latter city, capital of the Valle del Cauca department, the audience was mainly made up of press representatives, "special guests" and the film's actors. Following these screenings, the filmmakers were advised to make corrections and delete passages. The feature film was officially presented at Cali's Teatro Salón Moderno on November 18, 1922, or in December 1922, depending on the source. Several performances took place in Cali and the Valle del Cauca until December 7 of the same year. From then on, the press reported that the film would be shown in all Colombian departments and in other South American countries.

Máximo Calvo assigned agents to distribute the film throughout Colombia and Spanish-speaking countries. Gilberto Garrido, a Vallecaucano poet, was put in charge of the film's publicity. María was subsequently shown in various major Colombian cities, including Manizales in early February 1923, where it was well received. The film was released in Bogotá on July 13, 1923, at the Salón Olympia, and the following day at the Caldas de Chapinero theater. That year, the last screening in the capital took place at the Olympia on August 2. Also in 1923, audiences could see the feature film in Medellín on November 4, at the Salón Variedades in Cartagena de Indias on November 25 and at the Teatro Cisneros in Barranquilla on December 15, among others.

The feature film directed by Calvo and Del Diestro continued to be screened several years after its release. For example, it was shown again at Bogotá's Salón Olympia on September 10 and 25, 1926, and on October 26 of the same year. On June 9, 1928, the film even returned to its homeland with a new version made in the USA that included Spanish and English subtitles. The following day, a Buga correspondent for the newspaper El Tiempo noted that enthusiasm for María had not waned.

In their book Historia del cine colombiano, Martínez Pardo and Jorge Nieto declared that "the success throughout the country and Spanish-speaking countries was so great that the negative was sent to the United States to make new, higher-quality copies". (Note: Original quote: "El éxito en todo el país y los países de habla hispana fue tan grande que se envió el negativo al Estados Unidos para sacar nuevas copias de mejor calidad".) These were made by the American company Eastman Kodak in Rochester, before being distributed in Colombia in 1923, and in neighboring countries for several years. According to an article in the May 24, 1923 edition of the Colombian newspaper El Tiempo, Eastman Kodak returned color copies to the film's owners. However, it is often considered that the "black and white" tone was an essential attribute of silent cinema, even though there are several techniques that can give the illusion of color, as the preserved fragments are only in black and white. However, it is not known what colors were used when the Rochester prints of María were printed. Valley Film received the new versions in June 1923 and, on June 18, screened them in Cali in a private theater. The film was found to have "better sharpness and clarity in the landscapes".

=== Reception and impact ===
According to a press report, the film's stock increased by 300% before its premiere on October 20, 1922. Audience anticipation was high at the official presentation of María at Cali's Teatro Salón Moderno. While Calvo and Del Diestro's feature film was eagerly awaited by the public, this was not the case for some of the press, who expressed skepticism before seeing it. This was the case, for example, of Juan de Luna of the magazine Cromos, who doubted the quality of the performance of some of the actors, who were novices in the world of cinema at the time. In the end, the film was well received, with the press noting the tears and applause at the first screenings.

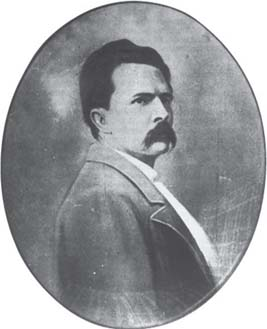
Jorge Isaacs, author of the adapted novel, whose portrait was featured at the start of the film.

It was considered a patriotic duty to attend one of María's screenings, and the film began with a depiction of the national flag featuring a portrait of Jorge Isaacs. Many of the reviews were positive. The film was praised for its faithful adherence to the literary work "in its most minute details", while other comments stressed that "the film provoked more tears than the novel". The technical quality of the film and the "splendor" of the landscapes filmed in the Valle del Cauca were also highlighted. In some opinions, "Calvo performed miracles". But the film was not exempt from faults. According to some critics, some of the actors " settled for distressed attitudes", while anachronisms were noted in clothing and furnishings. What's more, in Bogotá's El Gráfico newspaper, Eduardo Castillo criticized the film for its old-fashioned romanticism, aimed at "the naive and the sensitive".

María was the only Colombian film of the period to be shown in national cinemas for several years, from its release in 1922 until at least 1928. While the feature was a success domestically, it was "a disaster" abroad, according to Berta Lorente, daughter of the director of the Valley Film production company. This opinion was shared by Manolo Narváez, Máximo Calvo's son-in-law, who stated that Calvo had not made any money from screenings in other southern countries.

María allowed Máximo Calvo, who owned a quarter of Valley Film's shares, to pocket USD $40,000. Alfredo del Diestro received only 8,000 Colombian pesos because, according to Calvo, he had not paid in 25% of Valley Film's capital as he was supposed to. The positive public reception and commercial success of this feature gave a boost to Colombian film production, with other producers subsequently producing some twenty films during the silent era. Following the success of María, the Di Domenico brothers and SICLA also decided to adapt a novel for the big screen: Aura o las violetas by José María Vargas Vila.

=== Copyright controversy ===
The Valley Film production company registers the film with the Ministry of Public Instruction (Ministerio de Instrucción Pública), ignoring the copyright of the novel, inherited by Jorge Isaacs' children. Four days after the film's premiere, David, the eldest of the children, sent a letter to the editor of the newspaper El Tiempo, Eduardo Santos. In it, he wrote that the film had been made without his family's consent, adding that "the film's production had completed the work, seeking to circumvent [their] rights".

The film sparked the first copyright controversy in the Colombian film world, when the Isaacs family filed a lawsuit against Valley Film. In a resolution dated November 30, 1923, the Ministry of Public Instruction cancelled Valley Film's registration of María in the intellectual property register. It thus recognized that the exploitation of the work María through the film of the same name infringed copyright. The conflict between the two parties came to an end on November 7, 1924, with the signing of a public document by the Notaría Tercera de Bogotá. The film production company acknowledged that the rights belonged to the writer's children, Julia, María, David and Clementina Isaacs González. The latter, in an interview in 1950, stated that she had received a royalty of five thousand pesos at the time of the trial.

As a result of this copyright controversy, the film was banned from screening by local authorities in several Colombian cities. This was the case, for example, in Medellín in July 1923, although it was finally screened there on November 4, 1923 in front of a large crowd of spectators, even though the trial with the Isaacs family was not yet over. Similarly, in Barranquilla, the July 25, 1924 screening was cancelled. However, this legal case, won by the Isaacs family, served as additional publicity for the film, which broke attendance records despite an increase in ticket prices. Valley Film's shares increased in value. New partners joined the film company, increasing its capital.

== Preservation ==
No copies of María remain. Calvo preserved a few photographs in an album, and the Colombian Film Heritage Foundation (Fundación Patrimonio Fílmico Colombiano) still has a twenty-five-second fragment of the film, which lasted around three hours. As of 2015, according to historian Yamid Galindo, there are officially three collections of stills from this feature film in Colombia. The latest known, comprising thirty photographs, is that obtained by Cali's film museum, Caliwood, following a donation in 2015 from Carmen Suárez de Lamprea, a close family friend of the museum's founder, Hugo Suárez Fíat. Another collection is in the possession of the Art Museum of the Bank of the Republic, while the third is part of a private collection in Medellín.

In 1985, Luis Ospina and Jorge Nieto attempted to retrace the history of the filming of María in a short documentary entitled En busca de María. In this film, Ospina is the voice of Alfredo del Diestro, while Carlos Mayolo plays Maximo Calvo, in the re-enacted scenes recounting the making of María.

Pictures of some scenes from the film

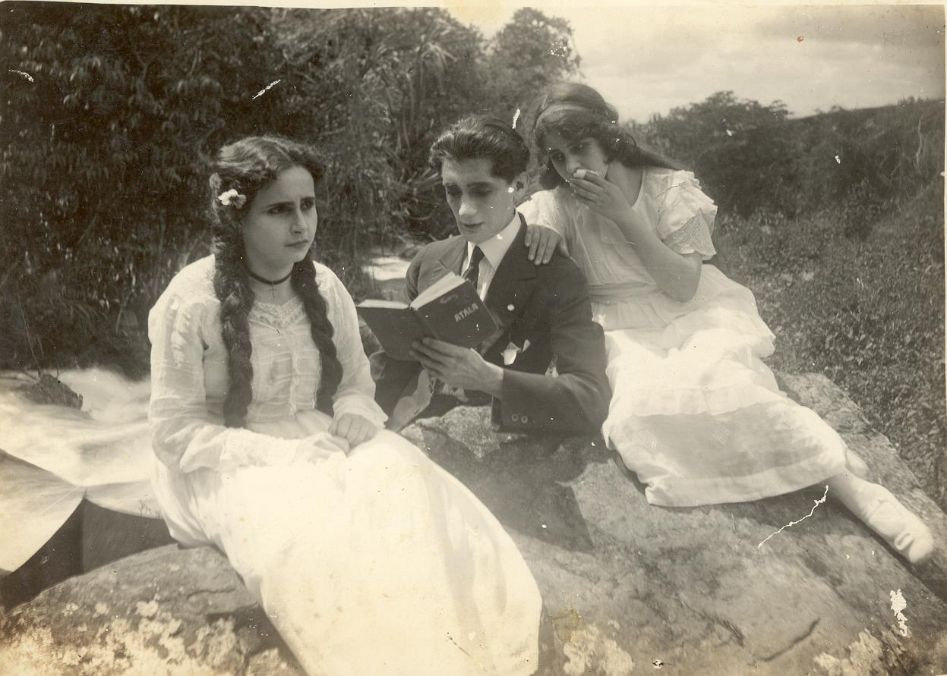

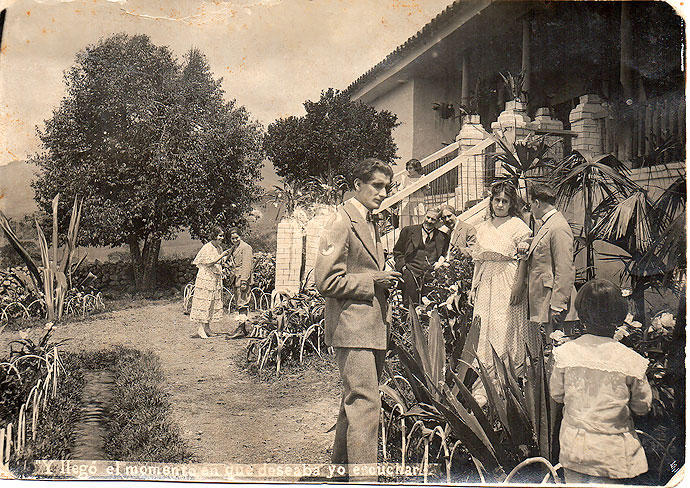

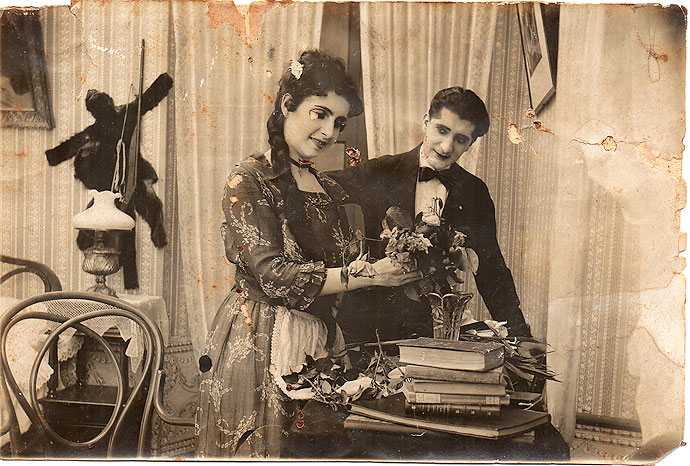

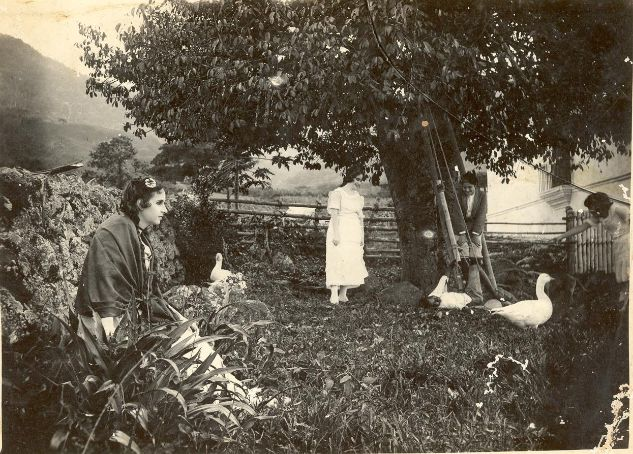

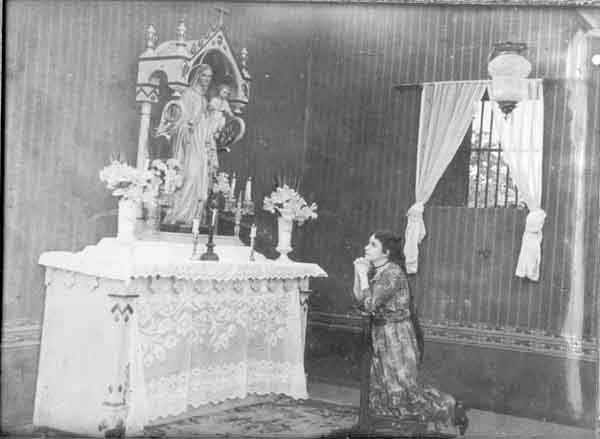

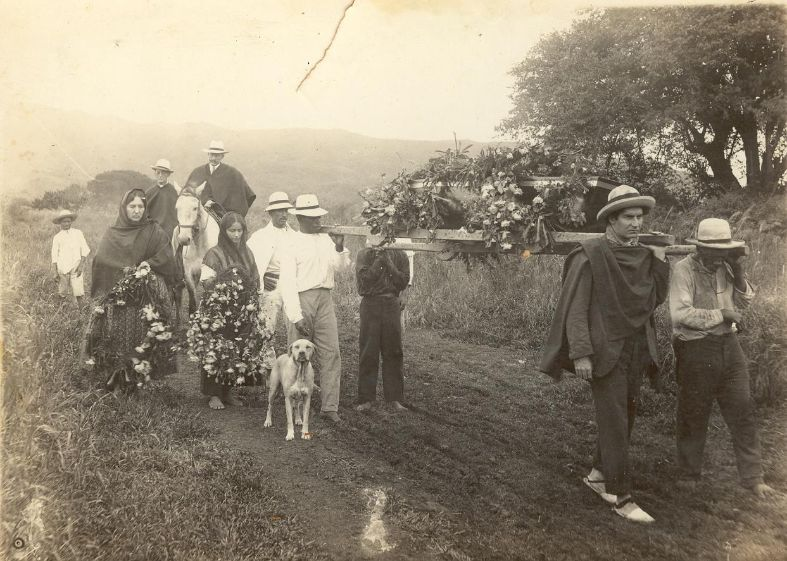

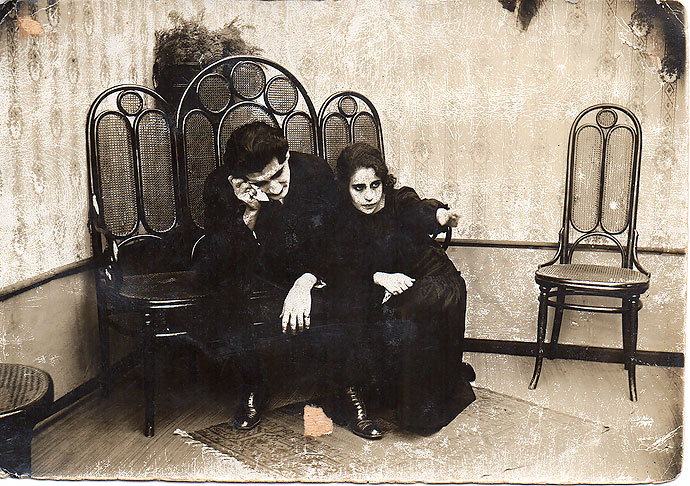

== See also ==
- Cinema of Colombia
- List of Colombian films
- List of lost films

== Bibliography ==
Documents used as a source for this article:

- Salcedo Silva, Hernando (1981). Cronicas del Cine Colombiano 1897 – 1950 (in Spanish). Carlos Valencia Editores.
- El'Gazi, Leila (April 1999). "María (Máximo Calvo)". Revista Credencial Historia (in Spanish) (112). Bogota.
- "2 La edad de oro". Historia del cine colombiano (PDF) (in Spanish). Fundación Patrimonio Fílmico Colombiano. 2012. p. 19-20. Archived from the original (PDF) on 2016-10-18.
- Concha Henao, Álvaro (April 2014). Historia social del cine en Colombia (PDF) (in Spanish). Vol. 1897–1929. Bogota: Escuela de Cine Black María. Archived from the original (PDF) on 2016-11-04.
