= Love, Duty and Crime =

1926 film

El amor, el deber y el crimen
- Directed by: Vincenzo di Doménico; Pedro Moreno Garzón
- Written by: Vincenzo di Doménico; Pedro Moreno Garzón
- Produced by: Vincenzo di Doménico; Pedro Moreno Garzón
- Starring: Rafael Burgos; Mara Meba
- Cinematography: Vincenzo di Doménico
- Edited by: Vincenzo di Doménico
- Music by: María Claudia Galán (restored version)
- Distributed by: Sociedad Industrial Cinematográfica Latinoamericana
- Release date: 1 August 1926
- Running time: 27 minutes
- Country: Colombia
- Language: Silent film

Love, Duty and Crime (Spanish: El amor, el deber y el crimen) is a 1926 Colombian silent film written and directed by Vincenzo di Doménico and Pedro Moreno Garzón.

The film revolves around a young committed woman who falls for the painter who made his portrait, so she will be immersed in a conflict.

== Cast ==
- Rafael Burgos
- Mara Meba
- Roberto Estrada Vergara
- Alejandro Barriga
