= La tragedia del silencio =

1924 film

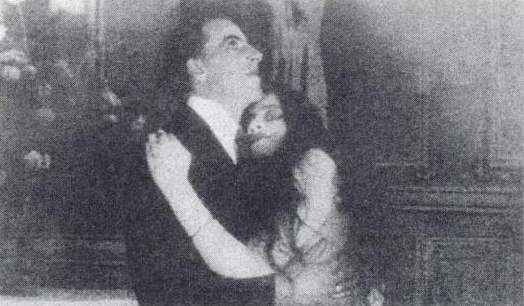
- A scene from the film showing the engineer and his wife
- Directed by: Arturo Acevedo Vallarino
- Written by: Arturo Acevedo Vallarino
- Cinematography: Hernando Bernal
- Music by: Alberto Urdaneta Forero
- Production company: Acevedo e Hijos
- Release dates: 18 July 1924 (Faenza theatre, Colombia)
- Country: Colombia
- Language: Spanish

La tragedia del silencio (literally "The Tragedy of Silence") is a Colombian melodrama film directed by Arturo Acevedo Vallarino and first screened on 18 July 1924 at the Faenza theatre in Bogotá. Filmed in black and white, it tells the story of a man suffering from leprosy. It was the first Colombian film during the silent film era with a film score, which was performed during the projection and was written by Alberto Urdaneta Forero.

At its first screening, the film was well-received by critics and the public and was later shown in Panama and Venezuela. Given the theme of leprosy, the film was criticized by some who believed it would have a negative impact on the image of Colombia. Although parts of the film have not survived, the Fundación Patrimonio Fílmico Colombiano retains a 22-minute 45-second excerpt from the film.

== Synopsis ==
La tragedia del silencio is a romantic melodrama. The 22-minute 45-second excerpt of La tragedia del silencio that remains shows that the film centres on a man suffering from leprosy. He is an engineer working for Ferrocarril Central, and in his spare time develops plans for an orphanage with a family friend, Father Alberto. After being informed that he has leprosy, he tells his wife and daughter of his fatal illness. A student then courts his wife. As the engineer is about to commit suicide, he learns that his diagnosis is incorrect, as a medical worker confused his test results with those of someone else. The engineer overcomes adversity and saves his marriage.

== Cast ==
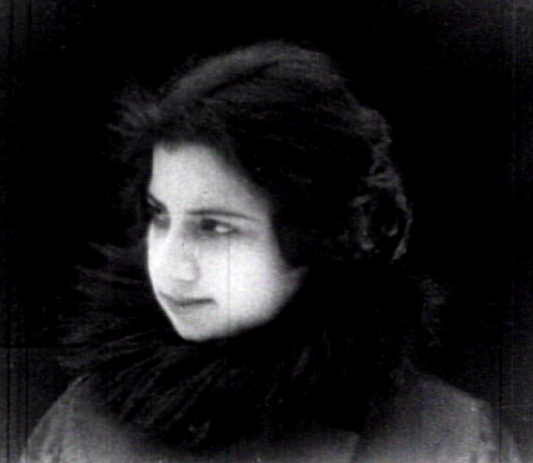
Lely Vargas in the film

- Lely Vargas
- Alberto López Isaza
- Gonzalo Acevedo Bernal as the student
- Isabel Vargas S.
- Alberto Argáez
- Inés Medina Niño
- Germán Santacoloma
- Mercedes Niño Medina
- Jorgito Acevedo González

== Production ==
=== Project ===
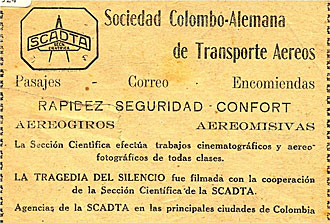
Announcement of the film's release in Cine Colombiano

Arturo Acevedo Vallarino was the producer and director of a theatre company in Antioquia and one of the pioneers of Colombian cinema. After the introduction of foreign films into Colombia, theatres were not as profitable, leading Acevedo to create a production house in 1920, Acevedo e Hijos (Acevedo and Son), originally known as Casa Cinematográfica Colombia. Acevedo wrote and directed the film.

According to Colombian film critic Luis Alberto Alvarez, to promote their film productions before releasing them, Acevedo e Hijos launched magazine Cine Colombiano, the first issue of which was published on 1 May 1924. In this first issue, the main article reveals the prologue and first four chapters of the film, with Coutin H. González credited as the author of the article. The musical score of the film, written by Alberto Urdaneta Forero, is also in this issue.

=== Implementation ===
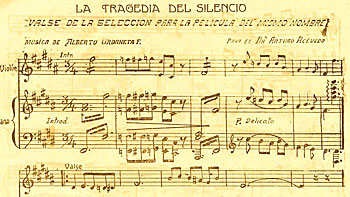
A section of the score by Alberto Urdaneta Forero from Cine Colombiano

La tragedia del silencio was shot in temporary studios in the house of a priest named Moreira, which is now the location of the Jorge Eliécer Gaitán Theatre. Initially, the film was shot with a Pathé camera with a 45mm lens, but later a 35mm Kodak Ektachrome was used. The chemicals used for the production of the film were purchased from Óptica Alemana, a company located in Bogotá founded in 1914 by Ernesto Schmidt Mumm. The photographic print was manufactured by the scientific section of airline SCADTA.

With La tragedia del silencio, production company Acevedo e Hijos ensured that this was the first full-length entirely Colombian film, with all actors and production team members being born in Colombia. It was the only Colombian film during the silent film era (1894 to 1929) to have a score.

== Reception ==
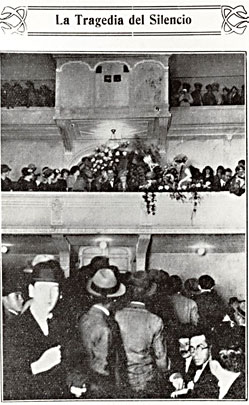
Part of the audience at the first screening of the film

The promotion strategy for the film played on nationalist sentiment by announcing that La tragedia del silencio was the first authentically Colombian movie. It was first screened to the public on 18 July 1924 in Faenza theatre in Bogotá, attracting a large audience. There were several technical problems including power failure and projector errors, caused in particular by the nervousness of the director and his son, the director of the theatre Joaquín Francisco, and operator Gustavo Francisco. However, the film was well-received by the public and the press, although some viewers complained about the poor image quality. The theatre was crowded during the seventeen showings of the film, but it was not very successful financially.

The first screening of La tragedia del silencio in Medellín was on 9 October 1924, and was praised by the local press as an important development for the Colombian film industry. Following this screening, Colombian industrialist Gonzalo Mejía provided financial support to Acevedo e Hijos, resulting in the release of their next film Bajo el Cielo Antioqueño in 1925. The film was also successful in Panama and Venezuela.

As the film addresses the topic of leprosy, some viewers voiced concerns that Colombia was frowned upon by the world because of the film, and that it resulted in the decrease of the price of Colombian coffee abroad.

== Analysis ==
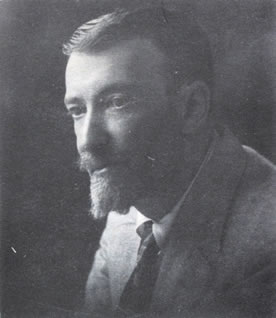
Director Arturo Acevedo Vallarino in 1925

=== Topics covered ===
La tragedia del silencio does not address political, social, or economic topics, nor different cultural aspects such as the lifestyle of the Colombian population. Acevedo did not intend for the film to create controversy, so it does not mention the situation in Colombia, the plot of the film instead focusing narrowly on one man's struggle between life and death. Although leprosy is the main theme of the film, there are other storylines that follow different protagonists and their motivations, such as the husband learning he must face his destiny when he learns about his disease, which requires him to separate from his family. After learning he does not have leprosy, he must confront a rival (the student) to regain the love of his wife.

The first issue of Cine Colombiano contained several images from La tragedia del silencio that could be allegories of Jesus, the Muisca myth of Bochica, or the Colombian civil wars. The film has a religious aspect in the character of Father Alberto, who refers directly to Colombian Father Rafael Almansa.

=== Film style ===
In an attempt to imitate the conventions of silent cinema in its infancy, the staging and acting of the film are exaggerated and artificial. The equipment used by Acevedo had limitations, causing the indoor scenes to be underexposed and the outdoor scenes to be overexposed. The Pathé camera did not allow camera movement, had an imprecise definition, and dark rendering. The Kodak Ektachrome lacked a large depth of field, producing a flat image, and required good lighting to operate effectively. Overhead shots are most commonly used, with some medium shots and a small number of large shots.

== Conservation ==
La tragedia del silencio (1924, fragment).

In 1987, the documentary Más allá del silencio La tragedia gave an overview of the work done by the Acevedo family. The documentary takes its name from La tragedia del silencio, however it also aimed to commemorate the first sound film of Colombia, Los primeros ensayos de cine parlante nacional, directed by Acevedo in 1937.

The Fundación Patrimonio Fílmico Colombiano is conserving and restoring the first nitrocellulose recordings of Colombian films, as well as some earlier Colombian films. It has been able to preserve 22 minutes and 45 seconds of La tragedia del silencio, at 18 frames per second. In 2009, the Fundación Patrimonio Fílmico Colombiano announced that it was releasing ten DVDs, including work by the Acevedo family. On 24 August 2009, the restored version of the film inaugurated the seventh festival of Colombian cinema in Medellín (Spanish: Festival de Cine Colombiano Ciudad de Medellín).

== See also ==
- Cinema of Colombia
