= Uraba, Medellin and Central Airways =

US airline (1932–1959) Pan Am subsidiary

IATA	ICAO	Call sign
UR^{(1)}	UR^{(1)}	—
- Founded: August 24, 1931 incorporated in Delaware
- Commenced operations: July 12, 1932
- Ceased operations: June 28, 1959
- Fleet size: See Fleet
- Destinations: See Destinations
- Parent company: Pan American; World Airways
- Headquarters: New York, New York

Notes
- (1) IATA, ICAO codes were the same until the 1980s

Uraba, Medellin and Central Airways (UMCA) was a Pan American Airways-affiliate airline that from 1932 flew from the then US-controlled Panama Canal Zone to Colombia. The carrier was majority and then wholly owned by Pan Am, and certificated in 1940 as a United States international scheduled carrier by the Civil Aeronautics Board (CAB), the now-defunct Federal agency that, at the time, tightly regulated almost all US commercial transportation. In 1959 the CAB permitted UMCA to cease operations. The carrier did not have a fleet or crews of its own; instead, Pan Am flew on behalf of UMCA.

== History ==
UMCA was incorporated in Delaware 24 August 1931 Pan Am organized UMCA in conjunction with a Colombian citizen, Gonzalo Mejía, with whom Pan Am shared ownership. UMCA started operations on 12 July 1932. In November 1940, the CAB certificated UMCA under the terms of the 1938 Civil Aeronautics Act, which required all airlines to be certificated. UMCA qualified by virtue of grandfathering, able to show that it performed bona fide scheduled service prior to the passage of the Act. UMCA was certificated to fly a route from Cristobal in the Canal Zone (Colón, Panama) to Medellin, Colombia via Balboa in the Canal Zone (Panama City), and Turbo, Colombia. At the time, Pan Am controlled 75% of UMCA voting shares.

UMCA functioned as a part of Pan Am. UMCA's headquarters address was that of Pan Am in New York City. Its flights were printed in Pan Am timetables, the airline used Pan Am aircraft and crews. However, the CAB regulated it separately and took that seriously (for instance, in 1957, the CAB scolded Pan Am for undercharging UMCA, then a wholly owned subsidiary, for aircraft rent), and the airline appears separately in CAB publications such as financial statistics and its flights carried its own IATA/ICAO code, UR. In 1947 Pan Am acquired 100% of the equity and over time, the airline dropped Cristobal and Turbo from the route, which thus became solely Panama City to Medellin. But in 1959, Pan Am decided the route was no longer worth flying and received CAB permission to stop UMCA operations. Operations ceased June 28.

== Fleet ==
- UMCA used Pan Am aircraft. In 1958, Pan Am used Douglas DC-3s and DC-4s on the UMCA route.

== Destinations ==
At the end, UMCA flew solely between Panama City and Medellin. Originally the airline flew Cristobal, Canal Zone to Turbo, Colombia to Medellin.

== See also ==
- List of defunct airlines of the United States
