= Garras de oro =

1927 silent Colombian film

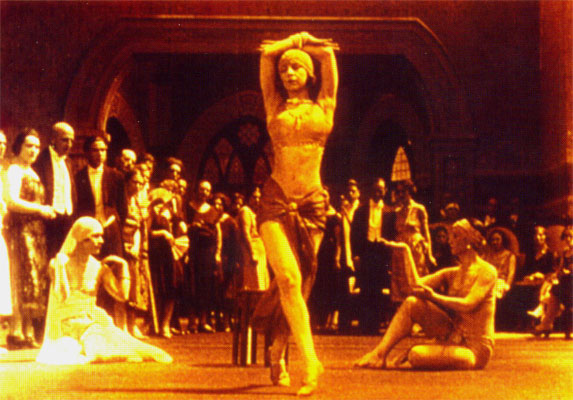
- Directed by: P. P. Jambrina (pseudonym)
- Music by: Marco A. Ruiz (restored version)
- Production company: Cali Films
- Release date: 13 March 1927
- Running time: 56 minutes (restored)
- Country: Colombia
- Language: Silent film

Garras de oro (Golden Claws), also known as Alborada de justicia (Dawn of Justice), is a 1927 Colombian silent film.

== Background ==
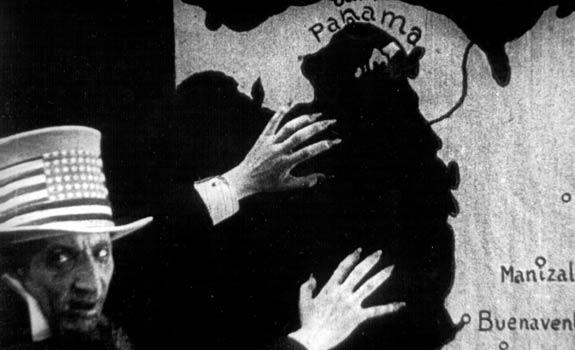
Uncle Sam reaching out for the isthmus of Panama.

The direction of the film is credited to "P.P. Jambrina", which was a pseudonym used by Alfonso Martínez Velasco, who became mayor of Cali from September 1930 to September 1931. The film is a fierce critique of United States policy towards Latin America, focusing in particular on the United States' backing of Panamanian separatists that led to the partition of the former Isthmus Department from Colombia.

The film's opening intertitle reads: "This film-novel is to protect from the oblivion of memory an important episode in modern history, which by fortune became the first stone in a landslide that tore apart our coat of arms and battered our eagles."

It is believed that all actors and staff involved in the film employed pseudonyms in order to avoid the fallout from what in 1926 was still a very polemical subject in Colombia. The film was censored by the Colombian government upon its release. It subsequently faded from the public view and was thought lost for decades.

It was found and restored by the Fundación Patrimonio Fílmico Colombiano, though only the film's beginning, end, as well as another three reels' worth of footage has been found.

The restoration of the extant footage was screened in New York City in 2008, followed by a second screening at the Guadalajara International Film Festival in 2009. The film has since been referred to as the first anti-imperialist film.

== See also ==
- Separation of Panama from Colombia
