= List of 2019 box office number-one films in Colombia =

This is a list of films which placed number-one at the weekend box office in Colombia during 2019. Amounts are in American dollars.

== Number-one films ==
†	This implies the highest-grossing movie of the year.

#	Weekend end date	Film	Box office
1	January 6, 2019	Aquaman	$1,881,590
2	January 13, 2019	Dragon Ball Super: Broly	$1,490,819
3	January 20, 2019	How to Train Your Dragon: The Hidden World	$1,132,612
4	January 27, 2019	How to Train Your Dragon: The Hidden World	$698,480
5	February 3, 2019	How to Train Your Dragon: The Hidden World	$500,359
6	February 10, 2019	How to Train Your Dragon: The Hidden World	$265,115
7	February 17, 2019	Alita: Battle Angel	$576,413
8	February 24, 2019	Cold Pursuit	$392,816
9	March 3, 2019	Cold Pursuit	$299,335
10	March 10, 2019	Captain Marvel	$2,674,729
11	March 17, 2019	Captain Marvel	TBD
12	March 24, 2019	Captain Marvel	$1,091,831
13	March 31, 2019	Dumbo	$1,362,072
14	April 7, 2019	Shazam!	$933,095
15	April 14, 2019	The Curse of La Llorona	$842,027
16	April 21, 2019	The Curse of La Llorona	$893,789
17	April 28, 2019	Avengers: Endgame †	$6,115,286
18	May 5, 2019	Avengers: Endgame †	$3,538,053
19	May 12, 2019	Avengers: Endgame †	$1,335,587
20	May 19, 2019	Avengers: Endgame †	$791,242
21	May 26, 2019	Aladdin	$1,402,851
22	June 2, 2019	Aladdin	$1,220,105
23	June 9, 2019	Dark Phoenix	$931,820
24	June 16, 2019	Aladdin	$590,152
25	June 23, 2019	Toy Story 4	$3,387,521
26	June 30, 2019	Toy Story 4	$2,430,117
27	July 7, 2019	Spider-Man: Far From Home	$2,144,092
28	July 14, 2019	Spider-Man: Far From Home	$1,187,555
29	July 21, 2019	The Lion King	$3,719,090
30	July 28, 2019	The Lion King	$2,499,628
31	August 4, 2019	Hobbs & Shaw	$1,590,282
32	August 11, 2019	Hobbs & Shaw	$757,625
33	August 18, 2019	The Lion King	$459,252
34	August 25, 2019	Angel Has Fallen	$353,170
35	September 1, 2019	Angel Has Fallen	$285,847
36	September 8, 2019	It Chapter Two	$1,471,658
37	September 15, 2019	It Chapter Two	$905,761
38	September 22, 2019	It Chapter Two	$447,094
39	September 29, 2019	Ad Astra	$168,676
40	October 6, 2019	Abominable	$299,149
41	October 13, 2019	Abominable	$317,058
42	October 20, 2019	Maleficent: Mistress of Evil	$1,551,440
43	October 27, 2019	Maleficent: Mistress of Evil	$1,205,481
44	November 3, 2019	Terminator: Dark Fate	$1,110,843
45	November 10, 2019	Maleficent: Mistress of Evil	$494,977
46	November 17, 2019	Terminator: Dark Fate	$332,097
47	November 24, 2019	Frozen 2	$1,360,976
48	December 1, 2019	Frozen 2	$949,009
49	December 8, 2019	Frozen 2	$509,061
50	December 15, 2019	Frozen 2	$529,530
51	December 22, 2019	Star Wars: The Rise of Skywalker	$979,570
52	December 29, 2019	Jumanji: The Next Level	$1,652,708
