= List of 2021 box office number-one films in Colombia =

This is a list of films which placed number-one at the weekend box office in Colombia during 2021. Amounts are in American dollars.

#	Weekend end date	Film	Box office
1	January 3, 2021	Wonder Woman 1984	$204,882
2	January 10, 2021	Wonder Woman 1984	$56,658
3	January 17, 2021	Greenland	$49,563
4	January 24, 2021	Greenland	$52,351
5	January 31, 2021	Greenland	$71,914
6	February 7, 2021	Greenland	$69,532
7	February 14, 2021	Tom & Jerry	$179,315
8	February 21, 2021	Tom & Jerry	$187,225
9	February 28, 2021	Tom & Jerry	$221,066
10	March 7, 2021	Tom & Jerry	$168,200
11	March 14, 2021	Tom & Jerry	$150,262
12	March 21, 2021	Tom & Jerry	$121,936
13	March 28, 2021	Raya and the Last Dragon	$24,205

== Highest-grossing films ==
Highest-grossing films of 2021
Rank	Title	Distributor	Domestic gross
1	Tom & Jerry	Warner Bros.	$1,295,517
2	Wonder Woman 1984	Warner Bros.	$810,434
3	Greenland	N/A	$602,241
4	Monster Hunter	Sony	$501,522
5	Chaos Walking	N/A	$353,866
6	Raya and the Last Dragon	Disney	$350,929
7	The Little Things	Warner Bros.	$189,542
8	Redcon-1	N/A	$107,562
9	Malasaña 32	N/A	$105,575
10	Freaky	Universal	$78,408
