= Jorge Isaacs =

Colombian writer and politician

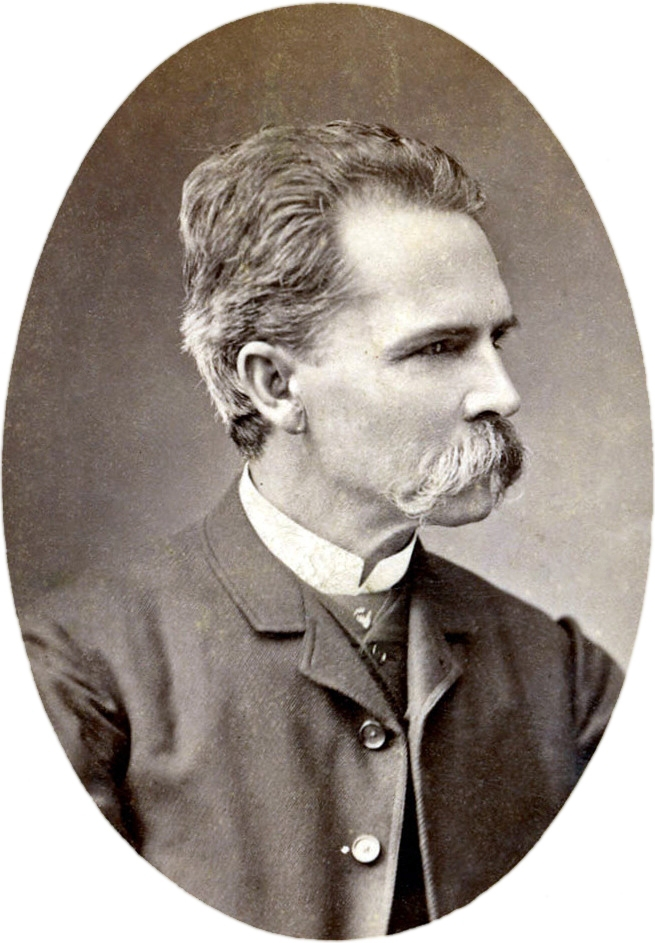
- Miniature portrait of Jorge Isaacs by Víctor Moscoso
- Writing career
- Period: 1859–1895
- Genres: Costumbrismo, poetry
- Subject: Novel
- Notable work: María
- Literary movement: Romanticism

Jorge Isaacs Ferrer

President of the Sovereign State of Antioquia
- In office February 1, 1880 – March 13, 1880
- Preceded by: Pedro Restrepo Uribe
- Succeeded by: Pedro Restrepo Uribe

United States of Colombia consul general to Chile
- President: Eustorgio Salgar

Personal details
- Born: Jorge Isaacs Ferrer; April 1, 1837 Cali, Valle del Cauca, Colombia
- Died: April 17, 1895 (aged 58) Ibagué, Tolima, Colombia
- Resting place: San Pedro Cemetery Museum
- Party: Conservative
- Other political affiliations: Radical Party
- Spouse: Felisa González Umaña
- Occupation: Writer, journalist, politician

Military service
- Years of service: 1851–1852, 1860–1862
- Battles/wars: Colombian Civil War (1860–1862)

Jorge Isaacs Ferrer (April 1, 1837 – April 17, 1895) was a Colombian writer, politician and soldier. His only novel, María, became one of the most notable works of the Romantic movement in Spanish-language literature.

== Biography ==
His father was George Henry Isaacs, an English Jew originally from Jamaica. He first settled in Chocó (then part of either Gran Colombia or the Republic of New Granada), where he made a fortune from gold mining and trade with the Caribbean. He then moved to Cali where he applied for his citizenship from Simon Bolivar. He married Manuela Ferrer Scarpetta, daughter of a Spanish Navy officer. He also owned two haciendas near Cali, called "La Manuelita" (named after his wife) and "El Paraíso". The latter would provide the setting for María. "El Paraiso" has been preserved as a museum, with emphasis upon its relation to the novel.

Jorge Isaacs was born in Quibdo, Republic of New Granada in 1837. He was first educated in Cali, then in Popayán and, finally, in Bogotá between 1848 and 1852.

Isaacs returned to Santiago de Cali in 1852 without finishing his baccalaureate studies. In 1854 he fought for seven months in the Cauca Campaign against the elected government of General José María Melo. In 1856 Isaacs married Felisa González Umaña, who was fourteen years-old at the time and they went on to have many children.

During the time of the civil wars his family went through a period of economic hardship. Isaacs tried unsuccessfully to become a merchant as his father. He then turned to literature and wrote his first poems between 1859 and 1860. During that time he also wrote several dramas of historical theme. Isaacs took arms again in 1860, this time against General Tomás Cipriano de Mosquera, and saw action in the Battle of Manizales during the Colombian Civil War. In 1861 Isaacs's father died; when the war ended Isaacs returned to Cali to take over the administration of his father's businesses, but he found them deeply in debt. This forced him to auction off two of his father's haciendas "La Rita" and "La Manuelita", which were bought by the industrialist Santiago Eder.

Isaacs's economic hardship took him back to Bogotá, where he found that his literary efforts were being well received. The members of the reader's club "El Mosaico" offered to publish his poems after Isaacs read them in one of their sessions. This compilation was published under the name Poesías in 1864. That year Isaacs took a job as the supervisor of the construction of a horse-path between Buenaventura and Cali and started to write María. Around that time he also fell ill with malaria.

When María was published in 1867 it became an immediate success both in Colombia and in other Latin American countries. As a consequence Isaacs became a well-known personality in Colombia and his newly found fame allowed him to start a career as journalist and politician. As a journalist he directed the newspaper La República, of moderate conservative tendencies, in which he also published some articles. As a politician he first joined the Conservative Party, but later switched to the Radical Party. In 1870 he was sent to Chile as consul general. On his return to Colombia he was actively involved in the politics of Valle del Cauca, which he represented in the Colombian Congress, and in 1876 he fought in yet another civil war. However his political career ended in 1879 after an incident where he proclaimed himself political and military leader of Antioquia in response to a conservative revolt.

After his retirement from politics Isaacs published in 1881 the first canto of the poem Saulo, although he was never able to complete it. He also explored the Magdalena Department, in the north of Colombia, where he found important coal and oil deposits. Isaacs spent the last years of his life in the city of Ibagué in Tolima where was planning to write a historical novel. He died of malaria on April 17, 1895.

== Literary work ==
Isaacs's literary work consists of his book of poems that he published in 1864 and his only novel, María (1867), considered one of the most outstanding works of Hispanic American literature of the 19th century. The book, based on romantic experiences, has an elegiac tone, and tells the story of the tragic love of Maria and her cousin Efrain, in Valle del Cauca. Like the author, Efrain must abandon Valle del Cauca to continue his studies in Bogota. He leaves his cousin Maria in Valle del Cauca, who he is in love with, and who he has a romance with when he returns six years later.

Efrain and Maria live together for some months, after which the young man has to travel to London to finish his education. When he returns, six years later, Maria has died. Some authors affirm that the character Maria was inspired by Maria Mercedes Cabal who lived in the neighborhood "El Paraiso" or "Paradise" and would later become the wife of President Manuel María Mallarino.

This work has been compared with that of Chateaubriand, but also has an ominous feeling of existence similar to that of Edgar Allan Poe. The novel is known for the feeling of the landscape, as well as for the artistic quality of the writing. It can be considered a precursor of the criollist books of the 1920s and 1930s.

Maria was published in 1867 and had immediate success. It was translated into 31 languages. In Colombia as well as in other Latin American countries, Isaacs became a well recognized figure. This led to an expanded career as a journalist and politician. As a journalist, Isaacs directed, in 1867, the newspaper La Republica from a moderate conservative approach where they published articles of a political nature.

== Image gallery ==
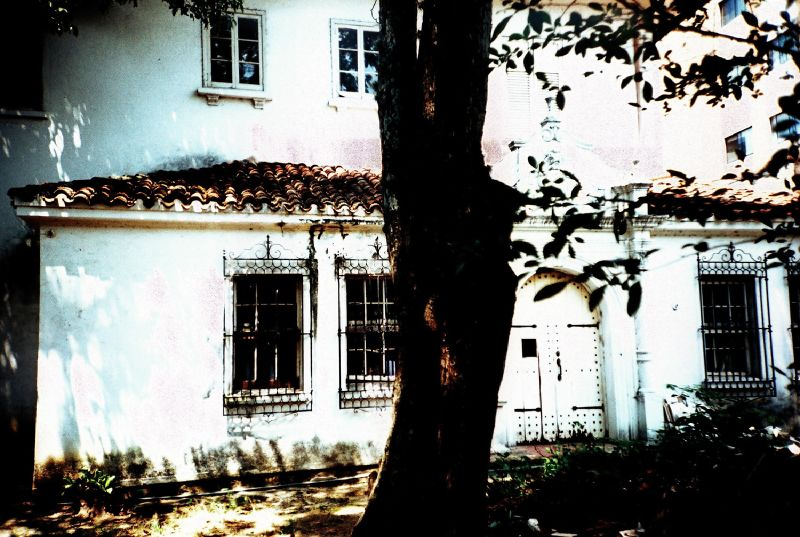
Jorge Isaacs's home in Santiago de Cali, Valle del Cauca, Colombia

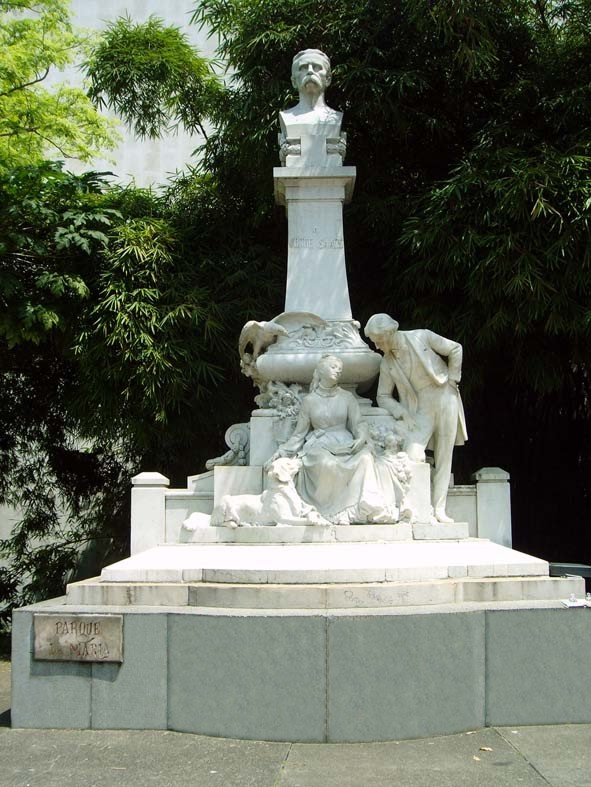
Jorge Isaacs's monument, Santiago de Cali, Valle del Cauca.

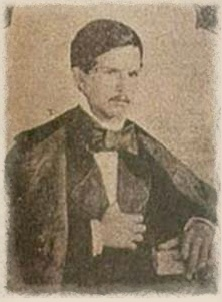
Jorge Isaacs in 1856.

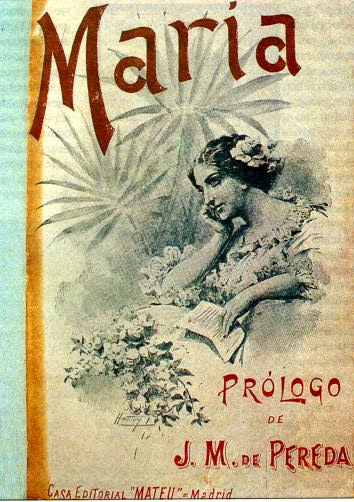
Cover of the novel María by Jorge Isaacs published in 1897 by Éditions Mateu. Prologue by José María de Pereda

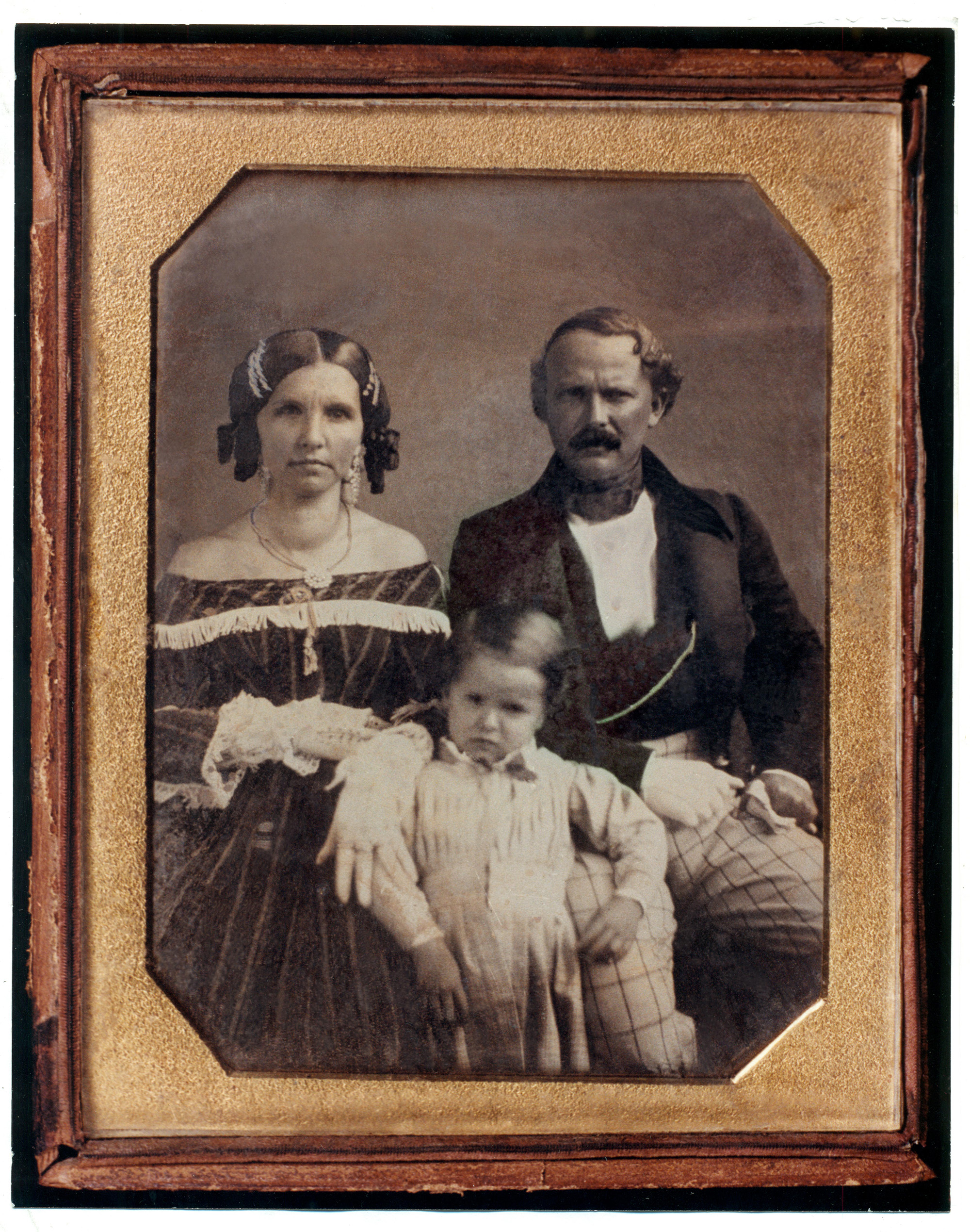
Manuela Ferrer Scarpetta and George Henry Isaacs, the poet's parents, with another of their children.

== See also ==
- María (1922 film)
