= List of 2016 box office number-one films in Colombia =

This is a list of films which have placed number one at the weekend box office in Colombia during 2016.

== Films ==
Finding Dory became the highest grossing film of 2016 despite never reaching #1.

Week	Weekend End Date	Film	Total weekend gross (Colombian peso)	Weekend openings in the Top 10	Reference(s)
1	3 January 2016	Star Wars: The Force Awakens	Unknown	Unknown	
2	10 January 2016	Star Wars: The Force Awakens	Unknown	Unknown	
3	17 January 2016	Star Wars: The Force Awakens	$13,764,173,643	Daddy's Home (#2), Joy (#9)	
4	24 January 2016	Daddy's Home	$1,245,427,444	The Hallow (#6), The Big Short (#7), The Hateful Eight (#8), Un gallo con muchos huevos (#10)	
5	31 January 2016	Daddy's Home	Unknown	Unknown	
6	7 February 2016	Daddy's Home	Unknown	Unknown	
7	14 February 2016	Deadpool	$3,129,807,548	Zoolander 2 (#5), Son of Saul (#8), Truth (#9)	
8	21 February 2016	Deadpool	Unknown	Unknown	
9	28 February 2016	Zootopia	$2,948,997,948	Gods of Egypt (#2), How to Be Single (#4), Brooklyn (#10)	
10	6 March 2016	Zootopia	$2,356,680	Solace (#5), Concussion (#6), 13 Hours: The Secret Soldiers of Benghazi (#8)	
11	13 March 2016	Kung Fu Panda 3	$2,657,358,924	The Divergent Series: Allegiant (#2)	
12	20 March 2016	Kung Fu Panda 3	Unknown	Unknown	
13	27 March 2016	Batman v Superman: Dawn of Justice	$9,700,490,540		
14	3 April 2016	Batman v Superman: Dawn of Justice	$4,996,502,676	Eddie the Eagle (#4), My Big Fat Greek Wedding 2 (#5), Visions (#6), Pawn Sacrifice (#7)	
15	10 April 2016	The Jungle Book	$3,909,462,960	London Has Fallen (#2), The Witch (#4), God's Not Dead 2 (#7)	
16	17 April 2016	The Jungle Book	Unknown	Unknown	
17	24 April 2016	The Jungle Book	Unknown	Unknown	
18	1 May 2016	The Jungle Book	Unknown	Unknown	
19	8 May 2016	The Jungle Book	Unknown	Unknown	
20	15 May 2016	The Jungle Book	Unknown	Unknown	
21	22 May 2016	The Jungle Book	Unknown	Unknown	
22	29 May 2016	The Jungle Book	Unknown	Unknown	
23	5 June 2016	The Jungle Book	Unknown	Unknown	
24	12 June 2016	The Jungle Book	Unknown	Unknown	
25	19 June 2016	The Jungle Book	Unknown	Unknown	
26	26 June 2016	The Jungle Book	Unknown	Unknown	
27	3 July 2016	The Jungle Book	Unknown	Unknown	
28	10 July 2016	The Jungle Book	Unknown	Unknown	
29	17 July 2016	Ice Age: Collision Course	$3,622,983,329	Ghostbusters (#2)	
30	24 July 2016	The Secret Life of Pets	$3,066,856		
31	31 July 2016	The Secret Life of Pets	$2,448,529,089	Central Intelligence (#2)	
32	7 August 2016	The Secret Life of Pets	Unknown	Unknown	
33	14 August 2016	The BFG	$724,126,078	Jason Bourne (#3)	
34	21 August 2016	Ben-Hur	$878,973,812	The Shallows (#3)	
35	28 August 2016	The Purge: Election Year	$618,361,500		
36	4 September 2016	The Purge: Election Year	Unknown	Unknown	
37	9 September 2016	Don't Breathe	$724,505,164		
38	18 September 2016	Don't Breathe	Unknown	Unknown	
39	25 September 2016	Storks	$1,883,693,588	The Magnificent Seven (#2), Our Kind of Traitor (#9)	
40	2 October 2016	Miss Peregrine's Home for Peculiar Children	$1,921,244,601	Deepwater Horizon (#3), Bad Moms (#6)	
41	9 October 2016	El Coco	$1,633,300,213	Pete's Dragon (#3), The Girl on the Train (#5), Cell (#7)	
42	16 October 2016	El Coco	$2,549,240,124	Inferno (#2), Blair Witch (#4), Masterminds (#7)	
43	23 October 2016	Ouija: Origin of Evil	$1,163,785,061	The Whole Truth (#9), Criminal (#10)	
44	30 October 2016	Trolls	$1,772,432,085	The Accountant (#3), Bridget Jones's Baby (#6)	
45	6 November 2016	Doctor Strange	$3,102,664,509	Keeping Up with the Joneses (#3), The Faith of Anna Waters (#6), Café Society (#9)	
46	13 November 2016	Doctor Strange	$1,764,151,336	Agente ñero ñero 7 (#2), Arrival (#4), The Light Between Oceans (#8), A Hologram for the King (#10)	
47	20 November 2016	Fantastic Beasts and Where to Find Them	$3,004,992,829	Skiptrace (#5), I. T. (#7), Jericó: El infinito vuelo de los días (#9)	
48	27 November 2016	Moana	$2,170,665,165	Jack Reacher: Never Go Back (#3), El hilo rojo (#10)	
49	4 December 2016	Moana	$1,724,337,107	Underworld: Blood Wars (#2), Christmas Eve (#6), Eso que llaman amor (#10)	
50	11 December 2016	Moana	$1,834,692,969	Office Christmas Party (#4), Shut In (#6), Blood Father (#8), Mis Peludos Angelitos (#9), Snowden (#10)	
51	18 December 2016	Rogue One: A Star Wars Story	$1,925,877,243	The Diabolical (#6)	
52	25 December 2016	El paseo 4	$1,512,921,821	Sing (#2), Passengers (#3), La La Land (#5),	
