= List of 2018 box office number-one films in Colombia =

This is a list of films which placed number-one at the weekend box office in Colombia during 2018. Amounts are in American dollars.

#	Weekend end date	Film	Box office
1	January 7, 2018	Jumanji: Welcome to the Jungle	$2,102,742
2	January 14, 2018	Jumanji: Welcome to the Jungle	$1,089,213
3	January 21, 2018	Jumanji: Welcome to the Jungle	$772,285
4	January 28, 2018	Maze Runner: The Death Cure	$603,507
5	February 4, 2018	Maze Runner: The Death Cure	$354,859
6	February 11, 2018	Fifty Shades Freed	$901,655
7	February 18, 2018	Black Panther	$1,895,472
8	February 25, 2018	Black Panther	$1,242,778
9	March 4, 2018	Black Panther	$1,079,596
10	March 11, 2018	Black Panther	$672,328
11	March 18, 2018	Tomb Raider	$814,573
12	March 25, 2018	Pacific Rim: Uprising	$692,590
13	April 1, 2018	Ready Player One	$866,517
14	April 8, 2018	A Quiet Place	$410,283
15	April 15, 2018	Rampage	$1,208,575
16	April 22, 2018	Rampage	$913,804
17	April 29, 2018	Avengers: Infinity War	$4,682,630
18	May 6, 2018	Avengers: Infinity War	$2,492,456
19	May 13, 2018	Avengers: Infinity War	$1,213,016
20	May 20, 2018	Deadpool 2	$1,455,606
21	May 27, 2018	Deadpool 2	$793,103
22	June 3, 2018	Deadpool 2	$582,142
23	June 10, 2018	Ocean's 8	$599,496
24	June 17, 2018	Incredibles 2	$2,864,221
25	June 24, 2018	Jurassic World: Fallen Kingdom	$1,760,621
26	July 1, 2018	Jurassic World: Fallen Kingdom	$1,542,885
27	July 8, 2018	Ant-Man and the Wasp	$1,298,599
28	July 15, 2018	Hotel Transylvania 3: Summer Vacation	$1,572,018
29	July 22, 2018	Skyscraper	$1,402,129
30	July 29, 2018	Mission: Impossible – Fallout	$940,183
31	August 5, 2018	Mission: Impossible – Fallout	$683,022
32	August 12, 2018	The First Purge	$540,839
33	August 19, 2018	The Meg	$1,181,813
34	August 26, 2018	The Meg	$918,533
35	September 2, 2018	The Meg	$591,584
36	September 9, 2018	The Nun	$2,542,779
37	September 16, 2018	The Nun	$1,390,912
38	September 23, 2018	The Predator	$640,146
39	September 30, 2018	The Predator	$470,731
40	October 7, 2018	Venom	$1,390,431
41	October 14, 2018	Venom	$1,118,997
42	October 21, 2018	Venom	$608,517
43	October 28, 2018	Halloween	$501,404
44	November 4, 2018	Bohemian Rhapsody	$870,859
45	November 11, 2018	Bohemian Rhapsody	$810,468
46	November 18, 2018	Fantastic Beasts: The Crimes of Grindelwald	$1,135,364
47	November 25, 2018	Ralph Breaks the Internet	$1,016,867
48	December 2, 2018	Ralph Breaks the Internet	$682,978
49	December 9, 2018	Ralph Breaks the Internet	$477,892
50	December 16, 2018	Ralph Breaks the Internet	$363,165
51	December 23, 2018	Spider-Man: Into the Spider-Verse	$276,950
52	December 30, 2018	Aquaman	$2,408,676

== Highest-grossing films ==
Highest-grossing films of 2018
Rank	Title	Distributor	Domestic gross
1	Avengers: Infinity War	Disney	$13,268,925
2	Aquaman	Warner Bros.	$11,320,289
3	Incredibles 2	Disney	$10,507,057
4	Jurassic World: Fallen Kingdom	Universal	$7,209,223
5	Black Panther	Disney	$6,797,886
6	The Nun	Warner Bros.	$6,364,132
7	Hotel Transylvania 3: Summer Vacation	Sony	$5,336,809
8	Venom	Sony	$5,123,601
9	Deadpool 2	Fox	$4,897,205
10	Bohemian Rhapsody	Fox	$4,531,562
