= El drama del 15 de octubre =

1915 film

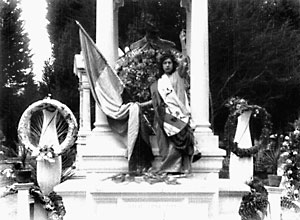
- Directed by: Di Domenico brothers
- Starring: Leovigildo Galarza; Jesús Carvajal
- Production company: Di Domenico Hermanos
- Release dates: 21 November 1915 (Salón Olympia, Colombia)
- Country: Colombia
- Language: Spanish

El drama del 15 de octubre (English: The Drama of 15 October) is a lost Colombian silent film directed by the Di Domenico brothers. Considered the first feature documentary film produced in Colombia, it depicts events surrounding the assassination of General Rafael Uribe Uribe on 15 October 1914, including a reconstruction of the killing itself. It was first screened to the public on 21 November 1915 at Salón Olympia in Bogotá.

El drama del 15 de octubre was heavily criticized for its subject matter, for incorporating photographs of Uribe's body, and for employing Uribe's killers in its reconstruction of his assassination. A court ordered all copies of the documentary destroyed, and its content is known only from newspaper articles contemporary to the movie's release. The controversy surrounding the film seriously affected the Colombian movie industry, which released no films for several years after.

== Synopsis ==
The film begins with a portrait of Uribe, and continues with footage of him while he was alive. Scenes shot by Vincenzo Di Domenico then follow, starting with Uribe's funeral. His coffin is carried from the Primary Cathedral of Bogotá to the cemetery, followed by a large crowd, and cars with wreaths on them. The police and army are present at the ceremony.

Uribe's killers, Leovigildo Galarza and Jesús Carvajal, are then shown. They take part in a reconstruction of the assassination, using actual images of the event.

Later in the film, tributes to Uribe on the first anniversary of his death are shown. The documentary ends with an allegorical scene at Uribe's tomb. A few still images from this scene survive, showing a painting titled La Apoteosis, depicting a woman waving the Colombian flag.

== Cast ==
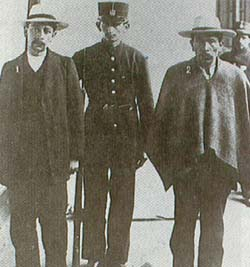
General Uribe's assassins (left and right)

Galarza and Carvajal play themselves in the reconstruction of the assassination.

== Production ==
In the early 1900s, economic growth in Colombia spurred the construction of movie theatres that played foreign films, such as the Olympia de Bogota (opened on 8 December 1912). Italian brothers Francesco and Vincenzo Di Domenico moved to Bogotá in 1909, and founded the Latin American Film Industry Society (Spanish: Sociedad Industrial Cinematográfica Latinoamericana) in 1913. Colombian film historian Luis Alfredo Alvarez considers this group to be the first attempt at a national film industry organization in the country. According to Colombian film critic Hugo Chaparro Valderrama, the Di Domenico brothers made El drama del 15 de octubre in an effort to be accepted into the Colombian community.

Galarza and Carvajal each received US$50 for appearing in the documentary.

== Reception ==
El drama del 15 de octubre was first screened at Salón Olympia in Bogotá on 21 November 1915. According to an article dated 23 or 24 November in the Barranquilla newspaper El Liberal, Uribe's family angrily protested. Nonetheless, the film continued to play in several Colombian cities.

The documentary's usage of Uribe's assassins, as well as photographs of Uribe's body, caused widespread outrage in Colombia. Newspapers deemed it an "immoral movie" and described Galarza and Carvajal's participation as "disgusting" and "criminal glorification", made worse by their having been paid for it. Riots took place in front of several theatres. Francesco Di Domenico cut the most controversial scenes and rereleased the documentary, but the governor of Cundinamarca Department, which at the time included Bogotá, banned the film. All copies of the movie were later destroyed by the authorities, and Galarza's and Carvajal's earnings from the documentary were confiscated. The film's controversy is depicted in Juan Gabriel Vasquez's The Shape of the Ruins, an examination of how violence and conspiracy theories infect the history of his country, Colombia.

== Lost film ==
El drama del 15 de octubre was banned by a Colombian court order, and all copies of the film were destroyed. All that remains of the documentary are descriptions and few still images, from contemporary newspapers.

== Impact on Colombian cinema ==
El drama del 15 de octubre is regarded as Colombia's first feature documentary film, but the controversy that resulted from its release effectively shut down the movie industry in Colombia for a time. Another film would not be released until Alfredo del Diestro and Máximo Calvo Olmedo's María, considered to be Colombia's first feature film, in 1922.

In 1922, the liberal newspaper Mundo al día characterized El drama del 15 de octubre as a blockbuster, while also describing the image quality of the film as "imperfect and primitive".

Interest in the film was revived in the 1970s and 1980s, as Colombian cinema's depiction of political and social issues was re-examined, and Compañía de Fomento Cinematográfico was created.

El drama del 15 de octubre is an example of the crime genre, which is well-represented in Colombian cinema.

== Gallery ==
Still images from El drama del 15 de octubre
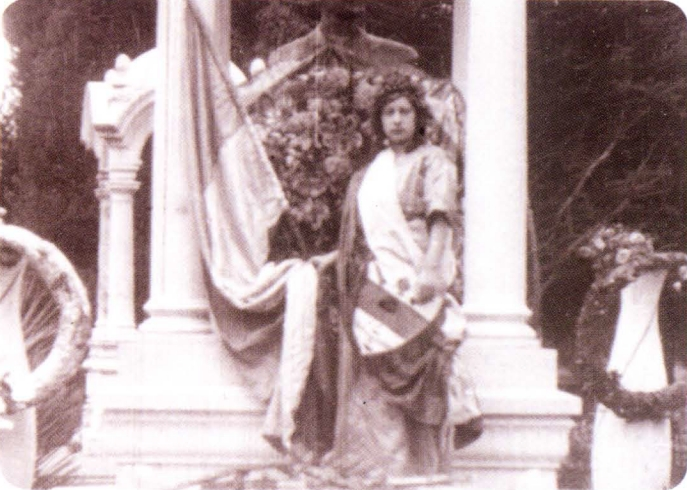

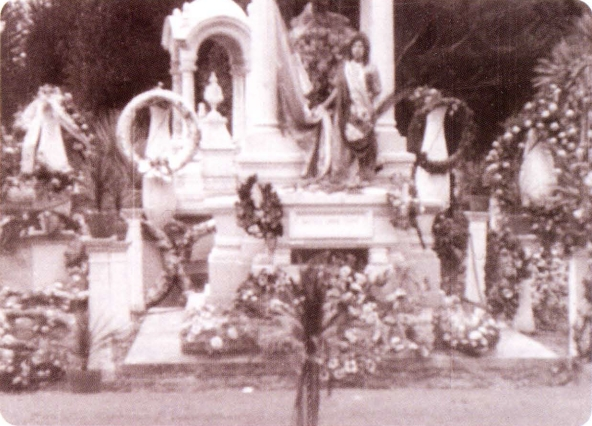

== See also ==
- List of lost films
