= Di Domenico brothers =

Italian film director duo

Francesco Di Domenico; Vincenzo Di Domenico
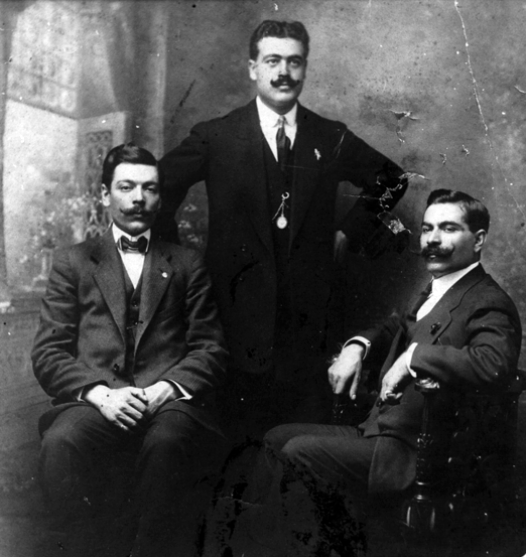
- Francesco Di Domenico (right) and Vincenzo Di Domenico (left) with their cousin Giovanni
- Born: Francesco — 1 August 1880; Vincenzo — 3 October 1882; Castelnuovo di Conza, Province of Salerno, Campania, Italy
- Died: Francesco — 26 November 1966 (aged 86), Villeta, Colombia; Vincenzo — 12 July 1955 (aged 72), Barcelona, Spain
- Occupation: Film directors
- Known for: El drama del 15 de octubre

Francesco Di Domenico (1880–1966) and Vincenzo Di Domenico (1882–1955), known together as the Di Domenico brothers, were Italian film directors who played an important role in Colombian cinema.

Francesco was born on 1 August 1880 in Castelnuovo di Conza and died on 26 December 1966 in Villeta, Cundinamarca Department. Vincenzo was born on 3 October 1882 in Castelnuovo di Conza and died on 12 July 1955 in Barcelona.

In the early 1900s, economic growth in Colombia led to the rise of the film industry, including the construction of movie theatres. The Di Domenico brothers moved to Bogotá in 1909, where they founded the Latin American film industry company (Spanish: sociedad industrial cinematográfica latinoamericana) in 1913, with their brothers Giuseppe and Erminio Di Ruggiero and cousins Donato and Giovanni Di Domenico Mazzoli. Colombian film historian Luis Alfredo Álvarez regards their initiative as the first organised attempt of a Colombian national cinema.

The Di Domenico brothers created a documentary after the assassination of General Rafael Uribe Uribe, known as El drama del 15 de octubre, which was first screened to the public on 21 November 1915. Regarded as the first feature documentary film of Colombia, the reconstruction of the murder, the usage of the actual assassins as actors in the film, and the images of General Uribe's body caused controversy, which led to riots in some movie theatres. The usage of the assassins of General Uribe in the reconstruction of the murder was described by many newspapers as "disgusting" and that it was "criminal glorification". The controversy that this film caused led the brothers to cut the most controversial scenes of the film, before it was banned in Colombia and subsequently destroyed.

El drama del 15 de octubre was considered a resounding failure of the Di Domenico brothers, but was later described by newspaper Mundo al día as a blockbuster despite the poor image quality.

== Filmography ==
Year	Film	Directed by	
Year	Film	Francesco	Vincenzo
1915	El drama del 15 de octubre	Yes	Yes
1915	La hija del Tequendama	Yes	Yes
1924	Aura o las violetas	No	Yes
1925	Como los muertos	No	Yes
1926	El amor, el deber y el crimen	No	Yes

Their cousin Donato Di Domenico also directed a film, Tierra caucana, in 1921.
