= María (novel) =

1867 novel by Jorge Isaacs

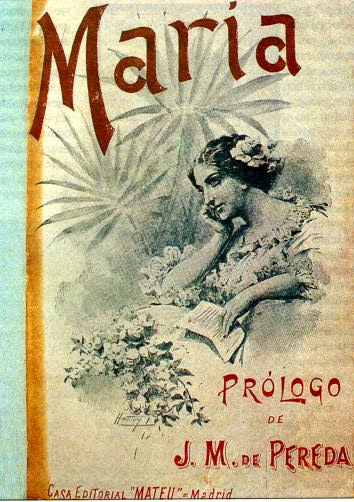
- Cover of the novel (1899 edition)
- Author: Jorge Isaacs
- Language: Spanish
- Genre: Romantic novel
- Publication date: 1867
- Publication place: Colombia
- Media type: Print (Hardback)

María, A South American Romance is a novel written by Colombian writer Jorge Isaacs between 1864 and 1867, and published in book form in 1867. It is a costumbrist novel representative of the Spanish Romantic movement. It may be considered a precursor of the criollist novels of the 1920s and 1930s in Latin America.

Despite being Isaacs' only novel, María is considered one of the most important works of 19th-century Spanish American literature. Alfonso M. Escudero characterized it as the greatest Spanish-language romantic novel. The Romantic style of the novel has been compared to the one of Chateaubriand's Atala. Notable is the description of the landscape and the artistic style of the prose.

The novel has several autobiographical elements, such as both main characters being natives of Valle del Cauca, or Efraín's departure to Bogotá to pursue his studies. It has been claimed that María herself is based, at least in part, upon a cousin of the author. The hacienda "El Paraíso" and its large slave population, both owned by Isaacs' family, also figures largely throughout the novel; the location is currently preserved as a museum.

María Monument in Cali depicts the characters of the novel.

== Plot ==
The story narrates the idyllic and tragic love between María and her cousin Efraín, both natives of Valle del Cauca. In the middle of a romantic and bucolic landscape, the young characters fall in love with each other but circumstances prevent the full realization of their love. Efraín returns from a six year stay in Bogotá, the capital of Colombia, during which time he was pursuing his high school education. After Efraín returns to Valle del Cauca the couple profess their love for each other, but they must temper their relationship since María becomes ill, apparently due to the excitement of their relationship. They can only stay together for three months before Efraín is forced to travel to London to study medicine. Two years later Efraín returns to Colombia after hearing that Maria is very ill. He returns too late, finding that María has died of illness. Heart-broken, Efraín decides to leave Cauca definitely, this time without a fixed destination.

== See also ==
- Colombian literature
- María (1922 film)
