= Arturo Acevedo Vallarino =

Colombian film director

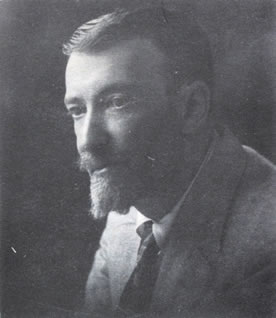
- Arturo Acevedo Vallarino in 1925
- Born: 1873; Bogotá
- Died: 1950 (aged 76–77)
- Occupation: Director
- Known for: La tragedia del silencio (1924); Bajo el Cielo Antioqueño (1925)

Arturo Acevedo Vallarino (1873–1950) was a Colombian film director known for the silent films La tragedia del silencio (1924) and Bajo el Cielo Antioqueño (1925).

He sold a timber plantation to buy his first movie camera. In 1920, he founded the production company, Acevedo e Hijos.

Arturo spent his childhood in Zipaquirá with his father, General Ramón Acevedo. In 1894 he graduated as a dentist. He married Laura Mendez Bernal and had six children.
