= List of 2020 box office number-one films in Colombia =

This is a list of films which placed number-one at the weekend box office in Colombia during 2020. Amounts are in American dollars.

== Number-one films ==
†	This implies the highest-grossing movie of the year.

#	Weekend end date	Film	Box office
1	January 5, 2020	Jumanji: The Next Level †	$1,509,642
2	January 12, 2020	Jumanji: The Next Level †	$872,538
3	January 19, 2020	Dolittle	$890,668
4	January 26, 2020	Bad Boys for Life	$1,126,260
5	February 2, 2020	Bad Boys for Life	$915,993
6	February 9, 2020	Bad Boys for Life	$528,755
7	February 16, 2020	Bad Boys for Life	$364,469
8	February 23, 2020	The Call of the Wild	$345,151
9	March 1, 2020	The Call of the Wild	$224,830
10	March 8, 2020	Onward	$687,326
11	March 15, 2020	Bloodshot	$250,060
12	March 22, 2020	Colombian cinemas closed and box office reporting suspended due to the COVID-19 pandemic	
13	March 29, 2020	Colombian cinemas closed and box office reporting suspended due to the COVID-19 pandemic	
14	April 5, 2020	Colombian cinemas closed and box office reporting suspended due to the COVID-19 pandemic	
15	April 12, 2020	Colombian cinemas closed and box office reporting suspended due to the COVID-19 pandemic	
16	April 19, 2020	Colombian cinemas closed and box office reporting suspended due to the COVID-19 pandemic	
17	April 26, 2020	Colombian cinemas closed and box office reporting suspended due to the COVID-19 pandemic	
18	May 3, 2020	Colombian cinemas closed and box office reporting suspended due to the COVID-19 pandemic	
19	May 10, 2020	Colombian cinemas closed and box office reporting suspended due to the COVID-19 pandemic	
20	May 17, 2020	Colombian cinemas closed and box office reporting suspended due to the COVID-19 pandemic	
21	May 24, 2020	Colombian cinemas closed and box office reporting suspended due to the COVID-19 pandemic	
22	May 31, 2020	Colombian cinemas closed and box office reporting suspended due to the COVID-19 pandemic	
23	June 7, 2020	Colombian cinemas closed and box office reporting suspended due to the COVID-19 pandemic	
24	June 14, 2020	Colombian cinemas closed and box office reporting suspended due to the COVID-19 pandemic	
25	June 21, 2020	Colombian cinemas closed and box office reporting suspended due to the COVID-19 pandemic	
26	June 28, 2020	Colombian cinemas closed and box office reporting suspended due to the COVID-19 pandemic	
27	July 5, 2020	The Invisible Man	US$210
28	July 12, 2020	1917	US$378
29	July 19, 2020	Colombian cinemas closed and box office reporting suspended due to the COVID-19 pandemic	
30	July 26, 2020	Colombian cinemas closed and box office reporting suspended due to the COVID-19 pandemic	
31	August 2, 2020	Colombian cinemas closed and box office reporting suspended due to the COVID-19 pandemic	
32	August 9, 2020	Colombian cinemas closed and box office reporting suspended due to the COVID-19 pandemic	
33	August 16, 2020	1917	US$223
34	August 23, 2020	The Invisible Man	US$1,584
35	August 30, 2020	The Invisible Man	US$294
36	September 6, 2020	Onward	US$7,147
37	September 13, 2020	Onward	US$3,251
38	September 20, 2020	1917	US$4,372
39	September 27, 2020	Onward	US$6,213
40	October 4, 2020	Onward	US$630
41	October 11, 2020	Onward	US$1,793
42	October 18, 2020	Onward	US$447
43	October 25, 2020	Onward	US$4,394
44	November 1, 2020	Onward	US$6,098
45	November 8, 2020	Onward	US$835
46	November 15, 2020	Onward	US$481
47	November 22, 2020	Onward	US$42
48	November 29, 2020	The Witches	US$70,894
49	December 6, 2020	Tenet	US$71,851
50	December 13, 2020	Tenet	US$62,270
51	December 20, 2020	Tenet	US$37,823
52	December 27, 2020	Wonder Woman 1984	US$341,483
