= Gonzalo Mejía =

Colombian entrepreneur (1884–1956)

Gonzalo Mejía Trujillo (1884 in Medellín – 1956) was a Colombian businessman. Together with Guillermo Echavarría Misas, he founded Compañía Colombiana de Navegación Aérea, which was the first aviation company and the provider of the first airmail services in the Americas. He took part in the development of the region of Urabá Antioquia, and of the highway from Bogotá to Turbo.

He was the Colombian partner for Pan American Airways when it organized Uraba, Medellin and Central Airways in 1932, which flew from Medellín to the then-US controlled Panama Canal Zone.

He also worked in film. He produced the film Bajo el cielo antioqueño, as well as appearing in it.

In the 1920s, the edificio Gonzalo Mejía was constructed on his initiative, and named after him.
