= List of 2017 box office number-one films in Colombia =

This is a list of films which placed number-one at the weekend box office in Colombia during 2017. Amounts are in American dollars.

#	Weekend end date	Film	Box office
1	January 8, 2017	Assassin's Creed	$966,590
2	January 15, 2017	Assassin's Creed	$566,679
3	January 22, 2017	XXX: Return of Xander Cage	$1,191,882
4	January 29, 2017	Resident Evil: The Final Chapter	$739,400
5	February 5, 2017	Rings	$676,998
6	February 12, 2017	Fifty Shades Darker	$854,643
7	February 19, 2017	The Great Wall	$669,284
8	February 26, 2017	The Great Wall	$481,046
9	March 5, 2017	Logan	$1,255,606
10	March 12, 2017	Kong: Skull Island	$895,512
11	March 19, 2017	Beauty and the Beast	$1,842,739
12	March 26, 2017	Beauty and the Beast	$1,298,146
13	April 2, 2017	The Boss Baby	$1,122,541
14	April 9, 2017	The Boss Baby	$860,960
15	April 16, 2017	The Fate of the Furious	$4,726,385
16	April 23, 2017	The Fate of the Furious	$2,240,556
17	April 30, 2017	Guardians of the Galaxy Vol. 2	$1,578,020
18	May 7, 2017	The Fate of the Furious	$661,776
19	May 14, 2017	Alien: Covenant	$372,450
20	May 21, 2017	King Arthur: Legend of the Sword	$553,993
21	May 28, 2017	Pirates of the Caribbean: Dead Men Tell No Tales	$2,056,864
22	June 4, 2017	Wonder Woman	$1,657,092
23	June 11, 2017	The Mummy	$1,100,952
24	June 18, 2017	Cars 3	$1,328,071
25	June 25, 2017	Cars 3	$707,140
26	July 2, 2017	Despicable Me 3	$2,197,680
27	July 9, 2017	Spider-Man: Homecoming	$1,628,660
28	July 16, 2017	Spider-Man: Homecoming	$898,272
29	July 23, 2017	Transformers: The Last Knight	$1,683,565
30	July 30, 2017	Transformers: The Last Knight	$637,957
31	August 6, 2017	War for the Planet of the Apes	$1,342,093
32	August 13, 2017	War for the Planet of the Apes	$504,364
33	August 20, 2017	War for the Planet of the Apes	$380,951
34	August 27, 2017	Annabelle: Creation	$911,312
35	September 3, 2017	Annabelle: Creation	$641,920
36	September 10, 2017	Monster Family	$217,747
37	September 17, 2017	It	$1,716,426
38	September 24, 2017	It	$990,001
39	October 1, 2017	It	$522,095
40	October 8, 2017	The Healer	$372,610
41	October 15, 2017	Condorito: La Película	$502,197
42	October 22, 2017	Geostorm	$718,188
43	October 29, 2017	Thor: Ragnarok	$1,550,116
44	November 5, 2017	Thor: Ragnarok	$1,589,104
45	November 12, 2017	Thor: Ragnarok	$1,007,047
46	November 19, 2017	Justice League	$2,290,772
47	November 26, 2017	Justice League	$1,192,454
48	December 3, 2017	Justice League	$754,444
49	December 10, 2017	Coco	$702,495
50	December 17, 2017	Star Wars: The Last Jedi	$950,248
51	December 24, 2017	Ferdinand	$486,879
52	December 31, 2017	Jumanji: Welcome to the Jungle	$1,754,848

== Highest-grossing films ==
Highest-grossing films of 2017
Rank	Title	Distributor	Domestic gross
1	The Fate of the Furious	Universal	$12,727,612
2	Jumanji: Welcome to the Jungle	Sony	$9,022,784
3	Justice League	Warner Bros.	$7,497,096
4	Despicable Me 3	Universal	$6,952,678
5	Coco	Disney	$6,767,566
6	Wonder Woman	Warner Bros.	$6,355,612
7	Beauty and the Beast	Disney	$5,772,950
8	Thor: Ragnarok	Disney	$5,473,781
9	Annabelle: Creation	Warner Bros.	$5,277,238
10	The Boss Baby	Fox	$5,180,077
