= Under the Antioquian Sky =

1925 film

Under the Antioquian sky
- Directed by: Arturo Acevedo Vallarino
- Written by: Arturo Acevedo Vallarino
- Produced by: Gonzalo Mejía Trujillo
- Starring: Alicia Arango de Mejía; Gonzalo Mejía Trujillo; Juan Naranjo
- Cinematography: Gonzalo Acevedo Bernal
- Edited by: Gonzalo Acevedo Bernal; Arturo Acevedo Vallarino
- Music by: Francisco Zumaqué (restored version)
- Distributed by: Compañía Filmadora de Medellín
- Release date: 6 August 1925
- Running time: 131 minutes
- Country: Colombia
- Language: Silent film

Under the Antioquian Sky (Spanish: Bajo el cielo antioqueño) is a 1925 Colombian silent film written and directed by Arturo Acevedo Vallarino.

== Plot ==
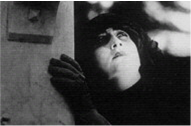
Still from the movie

Romantic drama of manners. Lina, graceful schoolgirl, argues against the will of his father, Don Bernardo, a romance with Alvaro, a young bohemian who squanders his fortune. They decide to escape from parental supervision, but in the train station a beggar hurt warns Lina about the serious error being committed. He bandages the wound with a tissue in which are inscribed his initials and she gratefully gives him her jewels and in turn tells her boyfriend not to pursue this adventure. The beggar is assaulted and murdered. His body appears with the handkerchief of Alvaro, who is accused of the crime. Although he is innocent, he stays silent to protect Lina and this, above his honor, confesses the truth. Alvaro, and innocent, is gold and ends happily married to Lina.

== Cast ==
- Alicia Arango de Mejía as Lina
- Gonzalo Mejía Trujillo as Don Bernardo
- Juan B. Naranjo as Álvaro
- Harold Maynham as Mister Adams
- Rosa Jaramillo as Mendiga
- Carlos Ochoa as Puntillas
- Eduardo Uribe as Bandido
- José Ignacio González as Detective
- Carlos Botero as Cura
- Ángela Henao as Campesina
- Berta Hernández as Señorita
- Lía Restrepo as Adela
- Jorge Restrepo as Carlos
