= Fundación Patrimonio Fílmico Colombiano =

The Fundación Patrimonio Fílmico Colombiano is a film archive in Bogotá, Colombia.

== See also ==
- List of film archives
