= Club Kids =

Group of US dance club celebrities

The Club Kids were a New York City-based artistic and fashion-conscious youth movement composed of nightlife personalities active from the late 1980s to 1996. Coined by a 1988 New York cover story, the Club Kids crossed over into the public consciousness through appearances on daytime talk shows, magazine editorials, fashion campaigns and music videos. Retrospectively, writers have commented that the Club Kids planted the seeds for popular cultural trends such as reality television, self-branding, influencers and even the "gender revolution". Known for their outrageous looks, legendary parties and sometimes illicit antics, the Club Kids were seen as the embodiment of Generation X and would prove to be "the last definitive subculture group of the analog world".

== Background ==
The group was first popularized by club promoter Michael Alig, James St. James, DJ Keoki, Ernie Glam, Julie Jewels, It Twins and Michael Tronn in the late 1980s, and, throughout the 1990s, grew to include Amanda Lepore, Waltpaper (Walt Cassidy), Christopher Comp, Jennytalia (Jenny Dembrow), Desi Monster (Desi Santiago), Astro Erle, Keda, Kabuki Starshine, and Richie Rich.

The Club Kids made long-lasting contributions to mainstream art, fashion and popular culture. According to former Club Kid Waltpaper (Walt Cassidy), "The nightclub for me was like a laboratory, a place where you were encouraged and rewarded for experimentation." At the height of the group's popularity, Alig began to spiral into heavy drug use, adding drug dealers to the Club Kids roster and Peter Gatien's payroll; an increasing number of Club Kids became addicted to drugs.

The movement began to decline when Rudy Giuliani took office as mayor of New York in 1994, targeting the city's nightlife industry with his Quality of Life campaign. It eventually collapsed after Alig was arrested for the killing and dismemberment of his roommate and fellow club kid Andre "Angel" Melendez, and Peter Gatien was charged with tax evasion and deported to Canada.

== Members ==
The term "club kid", coined by club owner Rudolf Piper, is now widely used as an archetypal style and personality reference, but was originally focused, from 1988 to 2001, on a shifting hierarchical group of New York based personalities that organized and promoted specific nightclub venues, tours to various cities and events, such at the Style Summits and Outlaw Parties; Michael Alig once estimated that the group expanded to include up to "750 in the early '90s at different levels", Michael Alig and rival personality, James St. James (born James Clark), first identified as "club kids" at nightclubs such at The World and Tunnel in 1988. Other documented personalities include:

- Amanda Lepore
- Astro Earl (also styled "Astro Erle")
- Chris Couture
- Christina Superstar
- Christopher Amazing
- Christopher Comp
- Clara the Carefree Chicken, the mascot of Alig's weekly Disco 2000 parties
- Codie Ravioli
- Cynthia Social Lies
- Dan Dan the Naked Man
- David Alphabet
- Desi Monster (Desi Santiago)
- Lisa E (Lisa Edelstein)
- Ernie Glam (Ernie Garcia)
- Ernie the Pee Drinker
- Patricia Field
- George the Pee Drinker
- Girlina (Lina Bradford, also known as DJ Lina)
- Gitsie (or Gitsey, Cynthia Haataja)
- Goldy Loxxx
- Michelle Harper
- Brooke Humphries
- Ida Slapter
- It Twins (Robert and Tim)
- Jennytalia (also styled "Jenny Talia" or "Genetalia", née Jenny Dembrow)
- Julie Jewels (Editor of Project X magazine)
- Julius Teaser
- Junkie Jonathan (also known as "Jonathan Junkie")
- Kabuki
- Kate Harwood
- Keda
- Kenny Kenny, the group's door person
- Keoki (also known as "Superstar DJ Keoki", born Keoni Franconi)
- Lady Bunny (born Jon Ingle)
- Lahoma van Zant (Jon Witherspoon)
- Larry Tee
- Lil Keni
- Lila Wolfe
- Karliin Mann
- Magenta
- Mavis
- Michael Tronn
- Michael T
- Michelle Visage
- Andre "Angel" Melendez
- Richie Rich
- Robert "Freeze" Riggs
- RuPaul
- Sacred Boy
- Screamin Rachael Cain
- Shuck E (Chuckie)
- Sophia Lamar
- Susanne Bartsch
- Sushi
- Thairin Smothers
- Tobell von Cartier
- Vivacious
- Waltpaper (Walt Cassidy)
- Whillyem (DJ - Limelight, Club USA, Tunnel)
- Zaldy

== Prominent chroniclers of the club kids culture ==
- Waltpaper, club kid and author of New York: Club Kids and The Club Kids by Waltpaper
- Michael Musto, Village Voice columnist and partygoer alongside the Club Kids
- James St. James, author of Disco Bloodbath: A Fabulous but True Tale of Murder in Clubland, a 1999 memoir of James' life as a Manhattan club kid, as well as Michael Alig's murder of Andre "Angel" Melendez. The memoir was retitled Party Monster after the 2003 movie that starred Macaulay Culkin, Seth Green, Chloë Sevigny, and Marilyn Manson.
- Nelson Sullivan, videographer and host of cultural gatherings and events
- Ernie Glam, Michael Alig, creators and hosts of the YouTube Channel show "Peeew!" which featured interviews of Club Kids and the history of the Club Kids.

== History ==
Alig moved to New York City from his hometown, South Bend, in 1984 and began hosting small events. In 1987, he supplanted Andy Warhol as a leading New York partier; in an article in Interview, Alig said: "We were all going to become Warhol Superstars and move into The Factory. The funny thing was that everybody had the same idea: not to dress up but to make fun of people who dressed up. We changed our names like they did, and we dressed up in outrageously crazy outfits in order to be a satire of them—only we ended up becoming what we were satirizing."

The Club Kids' aesthetic emphasized outrageousness, "fabulousness", and sex. Gender expression was fluid, and members embraced DIY. In Musto's words: "It was a statement of individuality and sexuality which ran the gamut, and it was a form of tapping into an inner fabulousness within themselves and bringing it out."

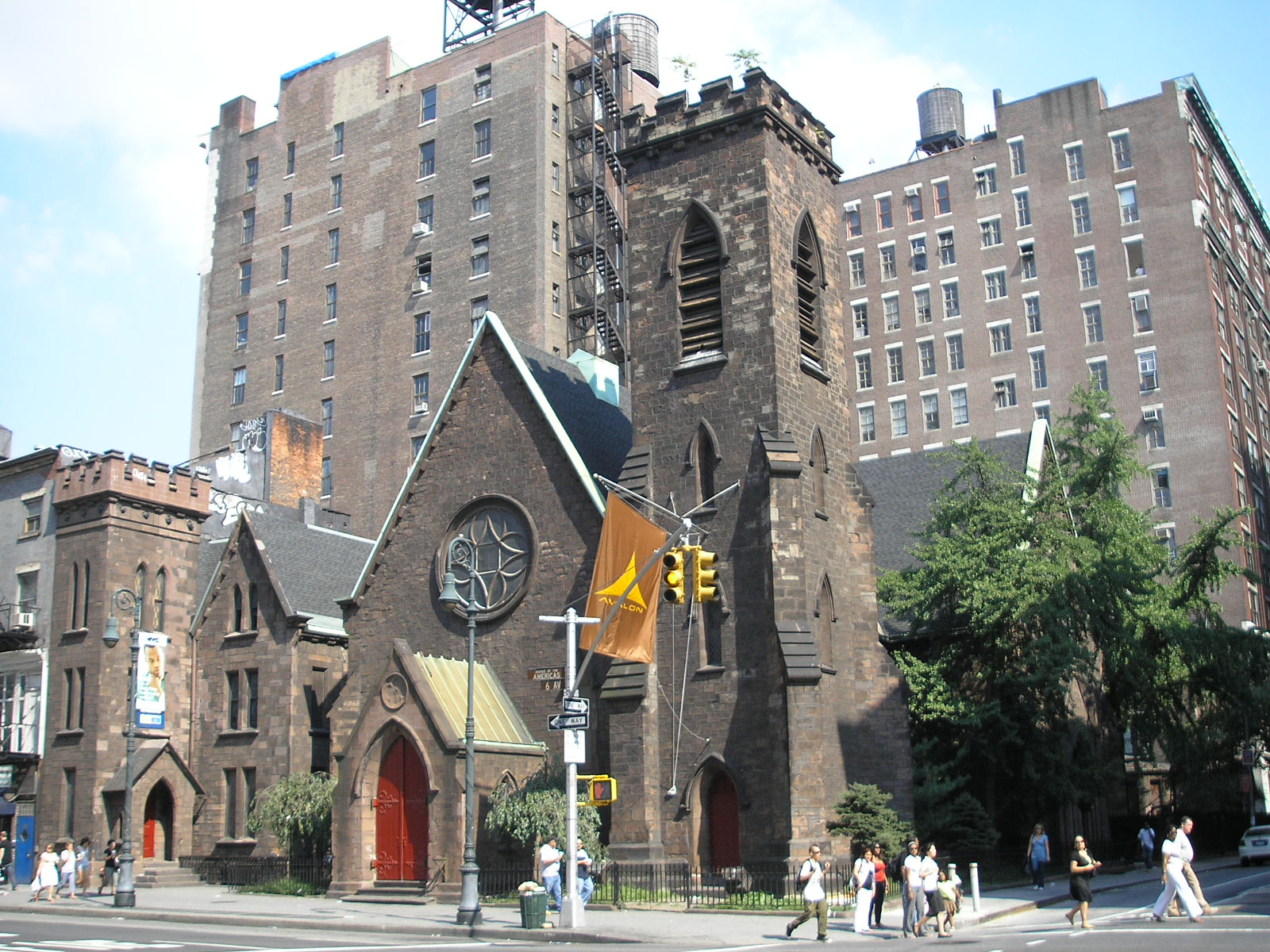
The Club Kids were fixtures at a number of New York clubs, including The Limelight (pictured)

As the group's influence grew, they spread from the back rooms of lesser-known clubs to venues such as Area, Rudolf Piper's Danceteria, and the Palladium. From there, Alig and his group went on to run Peter Gatien's club network, including Club USA, Palladium, Tunnel, and The Limelight. To draw crowds into these venues, Alig and the Club Kids began holding guerilla-style "outlaw parties", where, fully costumed and ready to party, they would hijack locations like Burger King, Dunkin' Donuts, McDonald's, ATM vestibules, the then-abandoned High Line tracks, and the New York City Subway blasting music from a boombox and dancing until the police cleared them out. Alig even "threw a party in a cardboard shantytown rented from its homeless inhabitants", whom he paid with cash and crack cocaine.

He ensured that such events always happened in the vicinity of an actual club to which the group could decamp. At the height of their cultural popularity, the Club Kids toured the United States (throwing parties, "certifying" those clubs for inclusion in the Club Kids network, and recruiting new members), and appeared on several talk shows, including Geraldo, The Joan Rivers Show, The Jane Whitney Show and the Phil Donahue Show.

As the 1990s began, the front line of the Club Kids became occupied by a younger group of dynamic personalities that were discovered and mentored by Alig, such as Waltpaper, Jennytalia (Jenny Dembrow), Desi Monster (Desi Santiago), Astro Erle, Christopher Comp, Pebbles, Keda, Kabuki Starshine, Sacred Boy, Sushi, Lil Keni, DJ Whillyem, Aphrodita, Lila Wolfe and Richie Rich. Many of these primary Club Kids lived together communally in large triplex apartments, and at the Chelsea Hotel and Hotel 17.

Prominent music personalities, such as Björk, then singer of the band Sugarcubes, were seen hanging with the Club Kids. With techno and the incoming rave scene, fashion began to soften into an ambiguous gender-fluid style, which melded references to the Club Kids with skate, indie, hip-hop, and grunge. Brands began casting street models and club personalities in shows, campaigns and music videos. Actress Chloë Sevigny emerged from the group at this time, and frequently modeled with Waltpaper, Jennytalia, DJ Whillyem, and Karliin Mann for brands like JYSP Johnson, Calvin Klein, and Jean-Paul Gaultier and in various editorials that showcased Rave vs. Club Kid style for magazines, including Paper, Max, Project X, Interview, Details and High Times.

The movement's decline was marked by an event on Sunday, March 17, 1996, when Alig and his roommate Robert "Freeze" Riggs killed former Limelight employee and reputed drug dealer Andre "Angel" Melendez. After nine months, Alig and Riggs were arrested. The group dissipated in the mid-1990s after Mayor Rudy Giuliani's "Quality of Life" crackdown on Manhattan's nightclubs.

Many of the members of the Club Kids distanced themselves from Alig as details of the murder were released and branded by the press and through documentaries such as Party Monster. Waltpaper stated in Interview: "I would say a lot of the community felt our experience of the time was hijacked by that Party Monster narrative...That's not the New York I knew. That narrative doesn't include the creativity, vibrancy, and cultural impact that I experienced." For his 2019 book, New York: Club Kids, Cassidy weaves an optimistic narrative where a bunch of misfits made a wonderland by being themselves.

== Depictions in art, entertainment, and media ==
=== Books ===
- A comprehensive document of New York City nightlife and street culture in the 1990s, New York: Club Kids by Waltpaper (Walt Cassidy) (published by Damiani, 2019), re-issued as The Club Kids (published by Hotglue, 2023), provides exclusive insight into the lifestyle of this celebrated and notorious clique, supported by an extensive curation of photography and ephemera.
- The events of Michael Alig's years as a club promoter up to his arrest are covered in James St. James's memoir Disco Bloodbath: A Fabulous but True Tale of Murder in Clubland (1999), re-released with the title Party Monster after the release of the eponymous 2003 film.

=== Films ===
- The documentary film Party Monster: The Shockumentary (1998) and the feature film Party Monster (2003) – both directed by former Club Kids Fenton Bailey and Randy Barbat, and focused on the murder of Melendez by Alig and Riggs – are based on St. James' memoir.
- A prison interview with Alig is featured in the documentary Limelight (2011), directed by Billy Corben and produced by Peter Gatien's daughter Jen Gatien .
- The documentary film Glory Daze: The Life and Times of Michael Alig (2015) reviews the creation, rise, and dispersion of the Club Kids phenomenon and the life of Michael Alig, including his return to New York City after serving a 17-year prison sentence for murdering Andre "Angel" Melendez.

=== Music ===
Ernie Glam and Jason Jay wrote "Party Clothes". It was released on the one year anniversary of Michael Alig's death. Later Ernie Glam and Jason Jay wrote "Fashion " and released it on May 21, 2022.

Greg Tanoose wrote and produced the song "What's In" with Michael Alig and DJ Keoki. It has Michael Alig on vocals.

- Angel Melendez's friend Screamin Rachael wrote the song "Give Me My Freedom/Murder in Clubland" after Alig and Gitsie took a road trip to visit her in Denver, arriving five weeks after Melendez's "disappearance". The lyrics to a backwards loop in the song include lines "Michael, where's Angel?" and "Did someone just cry wolf, or is he dead?"

=== Television ===
Melendez's murder case was featured on the TV series:

- American Justice: "Dancing, Drugs, and Murder" (2000) on A&E
- Deadly Devotion: "Becoming Angel" (July 16, 2013) on Investigation Discovery
- Notorious
- RuPaul's Drag Race: season nine, episode nine, titled "Your Pilot's on Fire", had a club kid theme on the runway.
- Saturday Night Live character Stefon (Bill Hader) is a parody of a stereotypical club kid; he and co-creator John Mulaney took inspiration from Party Monster in creating him.

=== Theatre ===
- Clubland: The Monster Pop Party (2013), a musical adaptation of St. James' book Party Monster and its 2003 eponymous film adaptation, debuted April 11, 2013 at the American Repertory Theater's Club Oberon, with book, music, and lyrics by Andrew Barret Cox

== See also ==
- Blitz Kids (New Romantics)
- Leigh Bowery
- New Romanticism
- Romo
- Raves
- Zippies

== Bibliography ==
- St. James, James (1999). Disco Bloodbath: A Fabulous But True Tale of Murder in Clubland. New York: Simon & Schuster. ISBN 978-0-684-85764-0.
- Bailey, Fenton; Barbato, Randy (Directors) (1998). Party Monster: The Shockumentary (documentary film). Picture This! Entertainment.
- Cassidy, Walt (2019). NEW YORK: CLUB KIDS by Waltpaper. Italy/New York: Damiani. ISBN 978-88-6208-657-8.
