= Screamin' Rachael =

- Born: Rachael Cain; Chicago, U.S.
- Occupations: Musician, Producer, CEO
- Years active: 1983–present

Screamin' Rachael, born Rachael Cain, is an American musician and Chicago native dubbed the "Queen of House Music" by Billboard magazine,. Rachael has been connected to the evolution of the House music genre, releasing some of the earliest recordings on pioneering label Trax Records and later becoming its president.. She has worked with performers such as Grandmaster Melle Mel, Marshall Jefferson, Colonel Abrams, Afrika Bambaataa, and many others.

== Career ==
Screamin' Rachael's first release with Trax Records was "My Main Man," released in 1985 as TX110. In 1987 she recorded Fun With Bad Boys with her friend and mentor, Afrika Bambaata.

Rachel married Trax Records founder Larry Sherman in 1995. In 2007 they divorced, and Sherman received 50% of the label's library. Rachael became owner and president of Trax Records and its trademark in 2007.

Some of the current artists she has been releasing include Saytek, Late Nite Dub Addict, Irene Michaels, DJ THADX, along with productions and music by Chicago House legend Joe Smooth.

== In popular culture ==
Rachael was part of the 1980s–1990s Club Kids scene and, in the documentary about its founder, titled Glory Daze: The Life and Times of Michael Alig (2015), she discusses her reaction to the disappearance of her friend Andre "Angel" Melendez and a song she wrote about it, titled "Give Me My Freedom/Murder in Clubland".

Her background has resulted in her being the subject of and in her making an appearance in multiple books, films, and documentaries. These include:

- The History of House Music
- Nightclubbing
- The Last Party
- Techno Style
- Party Monster: The Shockumentary (1998), Michael Alig details his and Gitsie's cross country drive after Alig and his roommate, Robert D. "Freeze" Riggs, had murdered Angel Melendez. The trip included a visit to Alig's friend, Screamin Rachael, who promptly released a song based on Angel's disappearance and rumors about his murder, titled "Give Me My Freedom/Murder in Clubland".
- Party Monster (2003)
- Disco Bloodbath
- Glory Daze: The Life and Times of Michael Alig (2015)
- As herself in the film Night Owl (1993)
- New York Homicide S3E3 in February 2025 "Killer Club Kids" on Oxygen network
