= Diana Scarwid =

American actress

- Born: August 27, 1955 (age 70); Savannah, Georgia, U.S
- Education: The American Academy of Dramatic Arts; Pace University
- Occupation: Actress
- Years active: 1976–2011
- Spouse: Eric Scheinbart (m. 1978; div. 1995)
- Children: 2

Diana Scarwid (born August 27, 1955) is a retired American actress who is best known for her portrayal of Christina Crawford in Mommie Dearest (1981). She received nominations for the Academy Award for Best Supporting Actress for Inside Moves (1980), and the Primetime Emmy Award for Outstanding Supporting Actress in a Limited Series or Movie for Truman (1995).

Scarwid has more than 70 film and television credits, including Pretty Baby (1978), Rumble Fish (1983), Silkwood (1983), Psycho III (1986), Extremities (1986), The Neon Bible (1995), What Lies Beneath (2000), Party Monster (2003), The Clearing (2004), and Another Happy Day (2011).

== Early life ==
Scarwid was born in Savannah, Georgia, the daughter of Elizabeth (née Frizelle) and Anthony John Scarwid. She has three brothers. Diana moved to New York City at 17 to become an actress. She graduated from The American Academy of Dramatic Arts and Pace University simultaneously, completing the dual program as an honor student.

== Career ==
=== 1980s ===
In 1980, Scarwid appeared in films Guyana Tragedy: The Story of Jim Jones and Honeysuckle Rose. She co-starred in films Inside Moves (1980), Mommie Dearest (1981), and Brenda Starr (1989). Scarwid earned an Academy Award nomination for Best Supporting Actress for her role in Inside Moves and a Razzie Award for Worst Supporting Actress in Mommie Dearest.

In television movies, Scarwid had performances in Desperate Lives (1982), Strange Invaders, Rumble Fish (1983), Silkwood (1983), The Ladies Club, Psycho III (1986), Extremities (1986), and After the Promise (1987).

=== 1990s ===
In 1991, Scarwid appeared in Night of the Hunter (1991). She portrayed Rose Kennedy in JFK: Reckless Youth (1993). In 1995, Scarwid appeared in films The Cure, The Neon Bible, Gold Diggers: The Secret of Bear Mountain and Heat, and she portrayed Bess Truman in Truman.

In 1996, Scarwid had roles in Trial By Fire and Bastard Out of Carolina, If These Walls Could Talk, Critical Choices, The Angel of Pennsylvania Avenue and The Outer Limits.

In 1998, Scarwid appeared in The X-Files ( episode "Kitsunegari"), Ruby Bridges, From the Earth to the Moon, A Will of Their Own, and Down Will Come Baby.

=== 2000s ===
Scarwid started the new century with the portrayal of Dianne Barrie in the TV movie Dirty Pictures (2000). The same year, she appeared as Michelle Pfeiffer's character's kooky friend in Robert Zemeckis's What Lies Beneath. In 2001, she guest-starred in Law & Order as a fingerprint analyst accused of manslaughter, and in 2003, she appeared as a prying mother in A Guy Thing. The same year, she portrayed Elke Alig, Michael Alig's enabling and neglectful German immigrant mother in Party Monster, the adaptation of James St. James's memoir Disco Bloodbath. The following year, she starred as Karen Tyler, a smothering mother in Wonderfalls. She returned to the Law and Order franchise with an appearance as a mother on the warpath after finding out her son is a victim of pedophilia in Law & Order: Special Victims Unit in the episode titled "Head".

In the mid-2000s, she had roles in Read Thread (2005), Valley of the Heart's Delight (2006); and Local Color (2006). The same year, she guest-starred as Jeanette Owens in Prison Break, following which she assumed the role of Isabel, a mysterious sheriff and island inhabitant in the TV series Lost. Consecutively, she assumed roles in episodes of other TV series, including Cold Case, Pushing Daisies, and Heroes. Nearing the end of the decade, she had roles on The Cleaner (2009) and Criminal Minds (2009).

=== 2010s ===
Scarwid appeared in the TV movie Backyard Wedding (2010) and Sam Levinson's Another Happy Day (2011).

== Filmography ==
=== Film ===
Year	Title	Role	Notes
1978	Pretty Baby	Frieda	
1980	Honeysuckle Rose	Jeanne	
1980	Inside Moves	Louise	
1981	Mommie Dearest	Christina Crawford	
1983	Strange Invaders	Margaret Newman	
1983	Rumble Fish	Cassandra	
1983	Silkwood	Angela	
1986	The Ladies Club	Lucy Bricker	
1986	Psycho III	Maureen Coyle	
1986	Extremities	Terry	
1986	Heat	Cassie	
1989	Brenda Starr	Libby "Lips" Lipscomb	
1995	The Cure	Gail	
1995	The Neon Bible	Sarah	
1995	Gold Diggers: The Secret of Bear Mountain	Lynette Salerno	
1996	Bastard out of Carolina	Raylene	
1996	The Angel of Pennsylvania Avenue	Annie Feagan	
1999	Down Will Come Baby	Dorothy Cotton a.k.a Gretchen McIntyre	
2000	What Lies Beneath	Jody	
2002	The Angel Doll	Fronia Black	
2003	A Guy Thing	Sandra Cooper	
2003	Party Monster	Elke Alig	
2004	The Clearing	Eva Finch	
2005	Red Thread	Miss Johnson	
2006	Valley of the Heart's Delight	Natalie Walsh	
2006	Local Color	Edith Talia	
2006	Swimming with the Virgin	Mother	Short film
2008	And Then She Was Gone	Woman in Disguise	Short film
2008	Dream Boy	Vivian Davies	
2011	Another Happy Day	Donna	

=== Television ===
Year	Title	Role	Notes
1976	Police Woman	Irene	"Sara Who?"
1976	Starsky & Hutch	Lisa Graham	"Nightmare"
1976	Gibbsville	Kathleen	"Andrea"
1977	In the Glitter Palace	Casey Walker	TV movie
1977	The Possessed	Lane	TV movie
1977	Kingston: Confidential	Erica	"Golden Girl"
1977	Bunco	Lolly	TV movie
1978	Forever	Sybil Davidson	TV movie
1978	Battered	Doris Thompson	TV movie
1979	Hawaii Five-O	Carole Walker	"The Spirit Is Willie"
1979	Studs Lonigan	Catherine Banahan	TV miniseries
1980	Guyana Tragedy: The Story of Jim Jones	Sheila Langtree	TV movie
1982	Desperate Lives	Eileen Phillips	TV movie
1982	Thou Shalt Not Kill	Susan Masters	TV movie
1985	A Bunny's Tale	Toby	TV movie
1987	After the Promise	Anna Jackson	TV movie
1991	Night of the Hunter	Willa Harper	TV movie
1993	American Experience	Louisa Holt	"Simple Justice"
1993	Labor of Love: The Arlette Schweitzer Story	Darlene	TV movie
1993	J.F.K.: Reckless Youth	Rose Kennedy	TV movie
1995	Truman	Bess Truman	TV movie
1996	The Outer Limits	Elizabeth Halsey	"Trial by Fire"
1996	If These Walls Could Talk	Marcia Schulman	Segment: "1996"
1996	Critical Choices	Diana	TV movie
1998	The X-Files	Linda Bowman	"Kitsunegari"
1998	Ruby Bridges	Miss Woodmere	TV movie
1998	From the Earth to the Moon	Joan Aldrin	"Mare Tranquilitatis"
1998	Before He Wakes	Joanne Michaels	TV movie
1998	A Will of Their Own	Crystal Eastman	"1.1"
1999	Down Will Come Baby	Dorothy McIntyre	TV movie
2000	Dirty Pictures	Dianne Barrie	TV movie
2001	Law & Order	Lisa Russo	"Myth of Fingerprints"
2002	Path to War	Marny Clifford	TV movie
2004	Wonderfalls	Karen Tyler	Main role
2004	Law & Order: Special Victims Unit	Jackie Madden	"Head"
2006	Prison Break	Jeanette Owens	"Subdivision", "Buried", "Dead Fall"
2007	Lost	Isabel	"Stranger in a Strange Land"
2008	Cold Case	Rayanne Leland	"Spiders"
2008-2009	Pushing Daisies	Mother Superior	Recurring role
2009	Tribute	Cathy Morrow	TV movie
2009	Heroes	Alice Shaw	"1961"
2009	The Cleaner	Mrs. Geiler	"Split Ends"
2009	Criminal Minds	Jane Winmar	"Cradle to Grave"
2010	Backyard Wedding	Susan Slauson	TV movie
