= Party Monster =

Party Monster may refer to

- Re-release title of Disco Bloodbath, a book by James St. James about the murder of Andre "Angel" Melendez
  - Party Monster: The Shockumentary, a 1998 documentary on the murder case and on the book
  - Party Monster (film), a 2003 feature film based on the book
- "Party Monster: Scratching the Surface", a season 4 episode of Unbreakable Kimmy Schmidt
- "Party Monster" (song), a 2016 song by The Weeknd

== See also ==
- Monster Party
