= Walt Cassidy (artist) =

American contemporary artist and designer

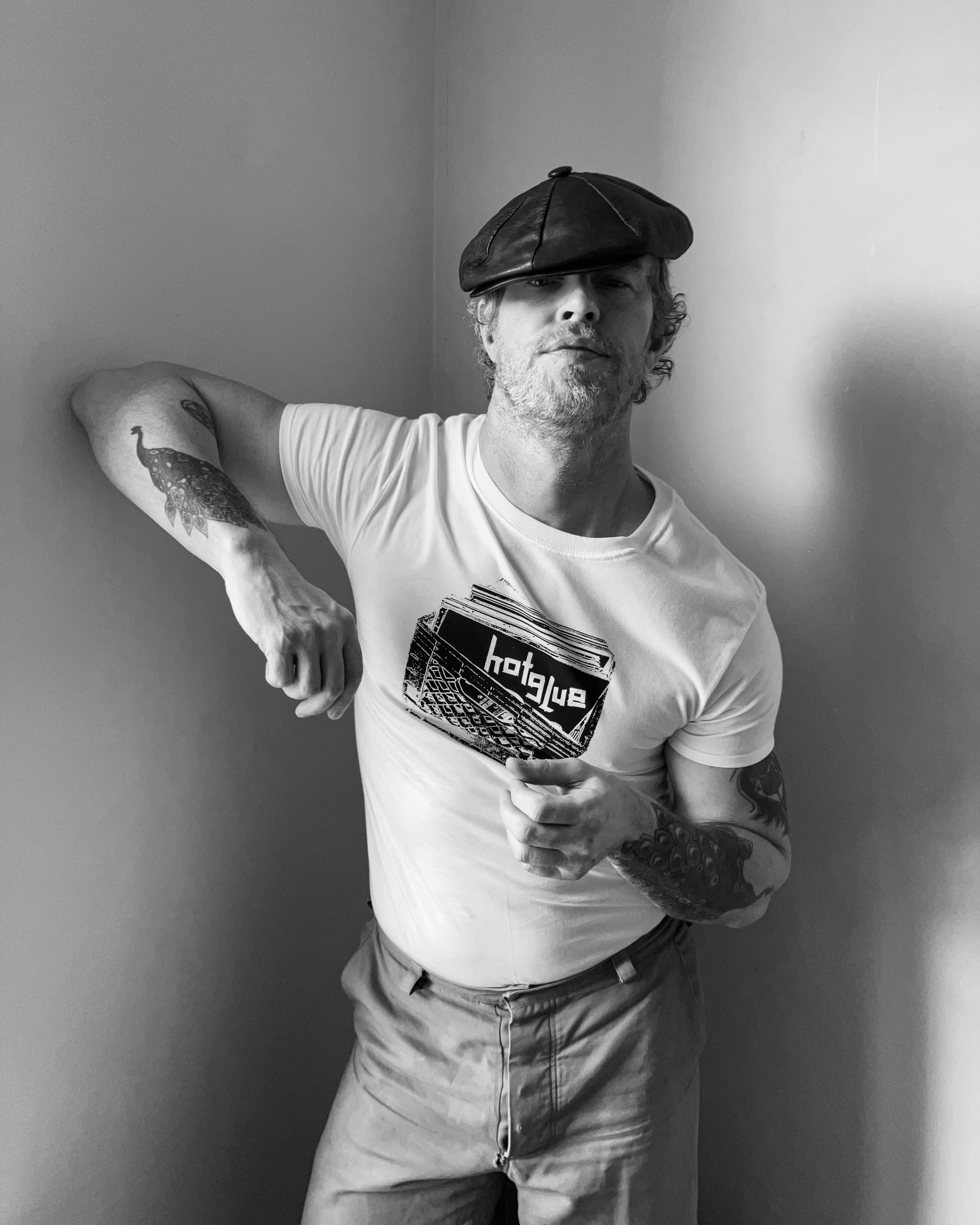
- Cassidy in 2023
- Born: November 21, 1972 (age 53); Los Alamitos, CA
- Education: Kent State University, Kent, OH; School of Visual Arts, New York City
- Known for: Contemporary Art, Design

Walt Cassidy (born November 21, 1972) is a New York City-based artist, author and curator notable for his contemporary art, books and participation in the New York City Club Kids culture. His exploratory art, writing and design emphasizes narrative abstraction and aestheticism while addressing autobiographical themes of subculture, gender, drugs, trauma and transformation.

== Walt Cassidy Studio (Design) ==
In 2014, Walt Cassidy Studio was established as a unisex brand encompassing jewelry, silkscreen printing and hand painted murals.

The jewelry gained attention through social media platforms, such as Instagram, and was discovered by Mark Holgate and profiled in Vogue in 2015.

Walt Cassidy Studio created jewelry for Derek Lam's Spring Summer 2016 collection, and has collaborated with the Long Life China Company and the Brazilian brand Melissa. The design works have been featured at The Limited Edition (Miami), The Feathered (Mexico City) and Maison 10 (New York).

In 2016, Walt Cassidy Studio began a series of interior based murals for private collections, largely focused on atmospheric color storms and muscular flower motifs. The murals extended to public spaces such as Leslie-Lohman Museum, The Pod Hotel and HOWM Restaurant at Selina Hotel in New York City.

== Artworks ==
Cassidy's artwork evolved from an interest in still life photography, sculpture, and illustration. The Kitchen Spells (2005) and The Inferior Orbs (2006) were first exhibited in The Believers at MASS MOCA and operate symbolically on multiple levels, indicating religious spiritualism and secular cultural resonance, while also working as deep autobiographical portraits.

The Protective Motif, Cassidy's first solo show in New York, debuted in 2010 at Invisible-Exports gallery in Manhattan's Lower East Side. The show included The Paper Photographs (2008), ink drawings, and the wall based sculptures, Nail Bomb (2009) and Through (2010). Cassidy works in cut brass, weaving, stripping, and hooking abstract patterns and textures on a wood frames. These works are minimalist in material but maximalist in emotion, and operate where autobiography meets methodology.

The Nervous Peal (2011) drawings were exhibited in The Displaced Person at Invisible-Exports, alongside works by Sue Williams and Ron Athey. In this series of ink drawings of athletic sculptures, Cassidy "examines structures that impose both conformity and alterity on the body. Carbon photography prints of idyllic male youths, framed within hand-drawn structures, reflect an eroticization of and dislocation from the male form. Tellingly, Cassidy's choice of settings includes New York's Jacob Riis beach, honoring a man who documented the plight of the industrial era's downtrodden".

== "Waltpaper" ==
Throughout the 1990s, Walt Cassidy (then called Waltpaper, a reference to his early illustration work) was at the center of the New York City Club Kids, an artistic and fashion-conscious youth culture. The group was a definitive force in New York City's underground club culture at the time and made long-lasting contributions to mainstream art and fashion. According to Cassidy, "The nightclub for me was like a laboratory, a place where you were encouraged and rewarded for experimentation." He lived at the Chelsea Hotel during this time period.

Cassidy founded the band BOOB (1995–98), a conceptual hardcore rock band, composed of various club kids, that began amidst the infamous Peter Gatien-owned nightclubs—The Limelight, Tunnel, Palladium, and Club USA—as well as the downtown venues CBGB and Don Hills. The band was known for their elaborate and over-the-top image, which sought to challenge gender social norms during the growing conservatism of Rudy Giuliani's "Quality of Life" campaign in New York City.

In October 2019, Cassidy’s first book, ''New York: Club Kids'', was published by Damiani. The book documents New York City’s club culture of the 1990s through a collection of photographs and commentary.

It includes over 500 images by 18 photographers and artists, depicting nightlife, fashion, club interiors, and participants associated with the scene. The work also outlines the development of the Club Kids movement and its presence in the city’s cultural landscape during that period. Cassidy has described the book as a reflection on the creative community surrounding the Club Kids scene in New York.

== Exhibitions ==
- 2006 – Gay Art Now, curated by Jack Pierson, Paul Kasmin Gallery, New York City
- 2007 – The Believers, curated by Elizabeth Thomas and Nato Thompson, Massachusetts Museum of Contemporary Art, North Adams, MA
- 2008 – Womanizer, curated by Kembra Pfahler, Deitch Projects, New York City
- 2010 – The Protective Motif, Invisible-Exports Gallery, New York City
- 2010 – Closed for Installation, 303 Gallery, New York City
- 2011 – The Unseen, curated by Adela Leibowitz, Torrance Art Museum, California
- 2012 – The Displaced Person, Invisible-Exports Gallery, New York City
- 2013 – The Wishing Well, Galeria Melissa, New York City
- 2013 – Drawing Down The Moon, curated by Andrew Suggs, VOX POPULI, Philadelphia
- 2013 – ARTCORE, Galerie Melilli Manchinetti, Berlin
- 2014 – Trip The Lights Fantastic, curated by Natalie Kates, High Line Gallery, New York City
- 2014 – The Botanica, curated by AA Bronson and Michael Bühler-Rose, Invisible Exports, New York City
- 2015 – Interface: Queer Artists Forming Communities Through Social Media, curated by Walt Cessna, Leslie-Lohman Museum of Gay and Lesbian Art, New York City
- 2020 – Things On Walls, curated by Benjamin Tischer / New Discretions, Affective Care, New York City
- 2022 – The Dance Of The Plumeria, Mural Installation, Selina Hotel, New York City
