= Miller Field (Staten Island) =

Historic military facility in Staten Island, New York

- Miller Army Air Field Historic District
- U.S. National Register of Historic Places
- U.S. Historic district
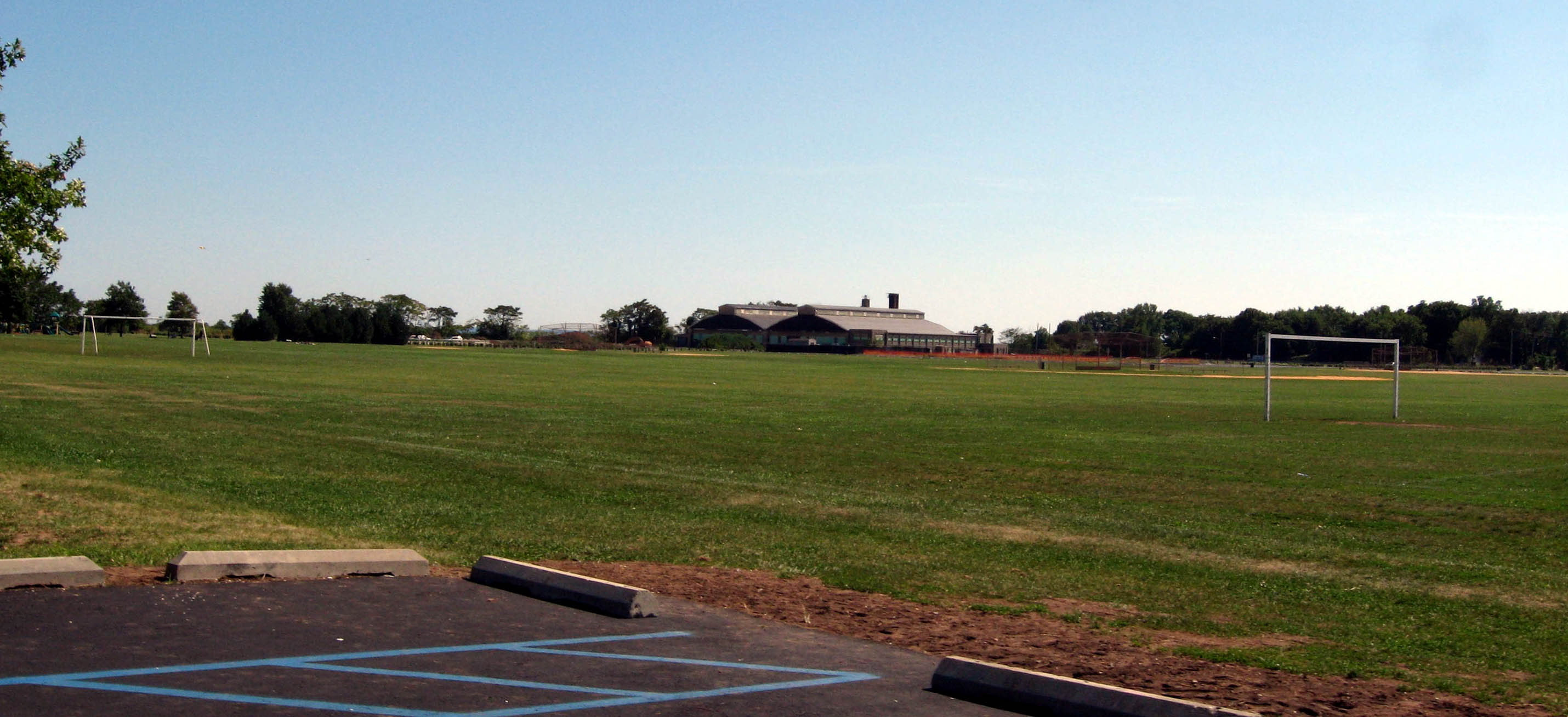
- Playing field

- Location within New York City Location within New York Location within the United States
- Location: New Dorp, Staten Island, New York, New York, United States
- Coordinates: 40°33′51″N 74°5′44″W
- Area: 3 acres (1.2 ha)
- Built: 1919
- Architect: U.S. Army
- NRHP reference No.: 80000362
- Added to NRHP: April 11, 1980

Miller Field was a United States Army facility in the neighborhood of New Dorp, Staten Island, New York. It was founded in November 1919 and completed in 1921.

== Etymology ==
James Ely Miller

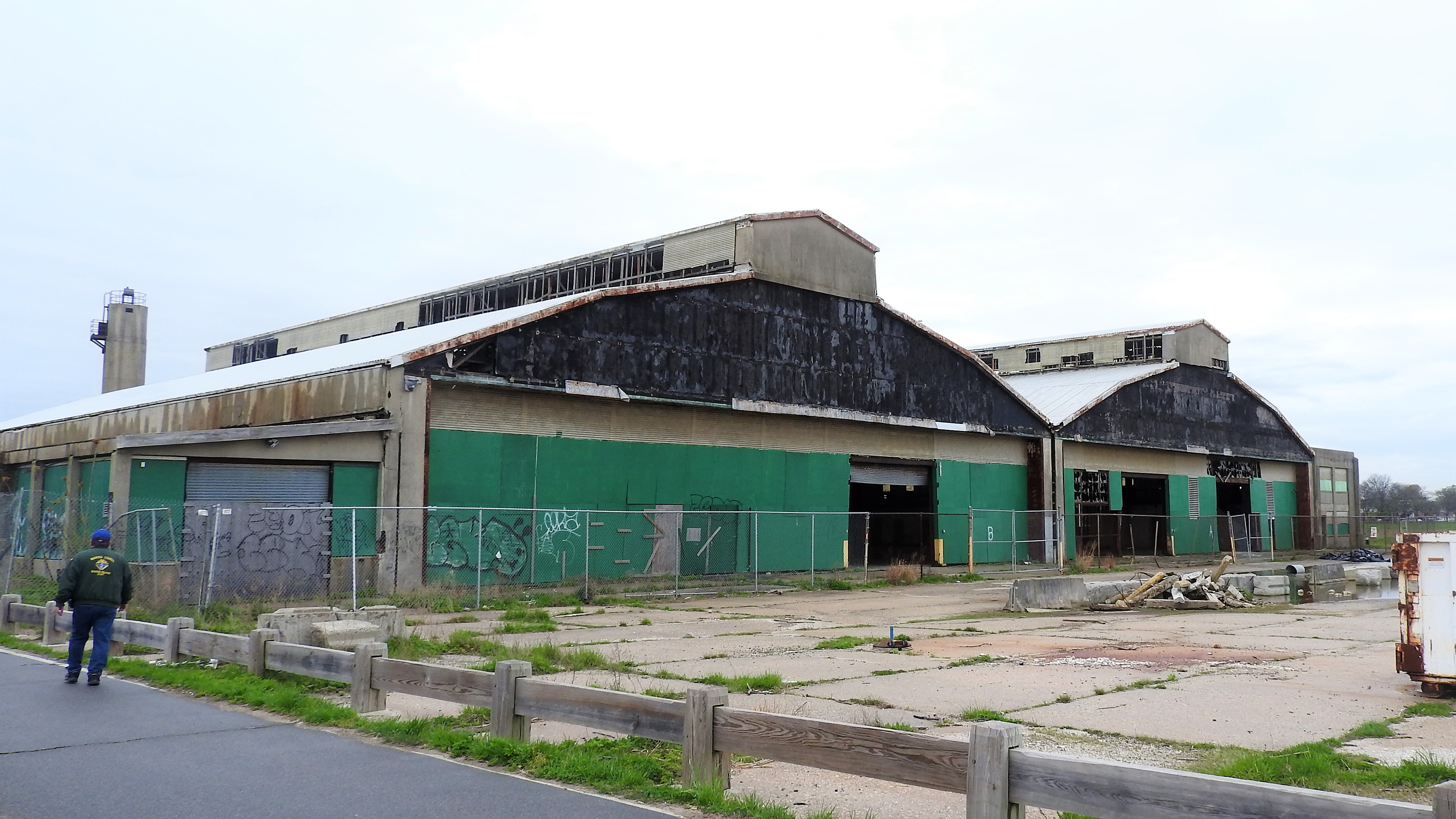
Seaplane hangars

Miller Field was named after Captain James Ely Miller (1883–1918), commanding officer of the 95th Aero Squadron in the Air Service of the AEF, who died in combat on March 9, 1918, over Rheims in World War I. He was the first United States aviator killed in action while serving with an American military aviation unit. Before World War I, Miller had been vice president of the Columbia Trust Company of New York and manager of its Fifth Avenue office. He trained at his own expense to earn his pilot's license and Reserve Military Aviator rating with the Governors Island Training Corps in 1916. He was also an organizer, along with Major Raynal Bolling, of the 1st Reserve Aero Squadron, the first unit of what would eventually become the Air Force Reserve Command.

== History ==
When built in 1921, Miller Field was the only coastal defense air station in the eastern United States and was part of the network of fortifications around New York City. It was built on land formerly belonging to the Vanderbilt family. It had a grass runway (and was the last airport with a grass runway in New York City), ramps for seaplanes, and four hangars for planes. Miller Field was used for anti-aircraft fire and training Coast Guard personnel. Miller Field closed as an airbase in 1969. US Army 11th Special Forces Reserve was stationed at Miller Field from March 22, 1963, to August 1, 1970.

The Field was the site of the Elm Tree Beacon Light, a lighthouse from 1856 through 1924 when it was abandoned (and later rebuilt). The light had replaced a prominent elm tree.

The Miller Army Air Field Historic District was listed on the National Register of Historic Places in 1980.

=== Accidents and incidents ===
On December 16, 1960, United Airlines Flight 826, a Douglas DC-8 and Trans World Airlines Flight 266, Lockheed Super Constellation, collided just west of the field, with the Constellation crashing into the northwest corner of the airport while the DC-8 crashed into Park Slope, Brooklyn. The collision was the world's worst airline disaster to that point, with 134 killed.

A FDNY Engine Company, on the day of the disaster, rammed the gates of Miller Field, not waiting on members of the Military Police Corps to let them into the Base.

== Current use ==
Miller Field is a part of the Staten Island Unit of the Gateway National Recreation Area, which is managed by the National Park Service. The park includes baseball and soccer fields, and hosts the New York Philharmonic in the summer. The field is directly east of New Dorp High School.

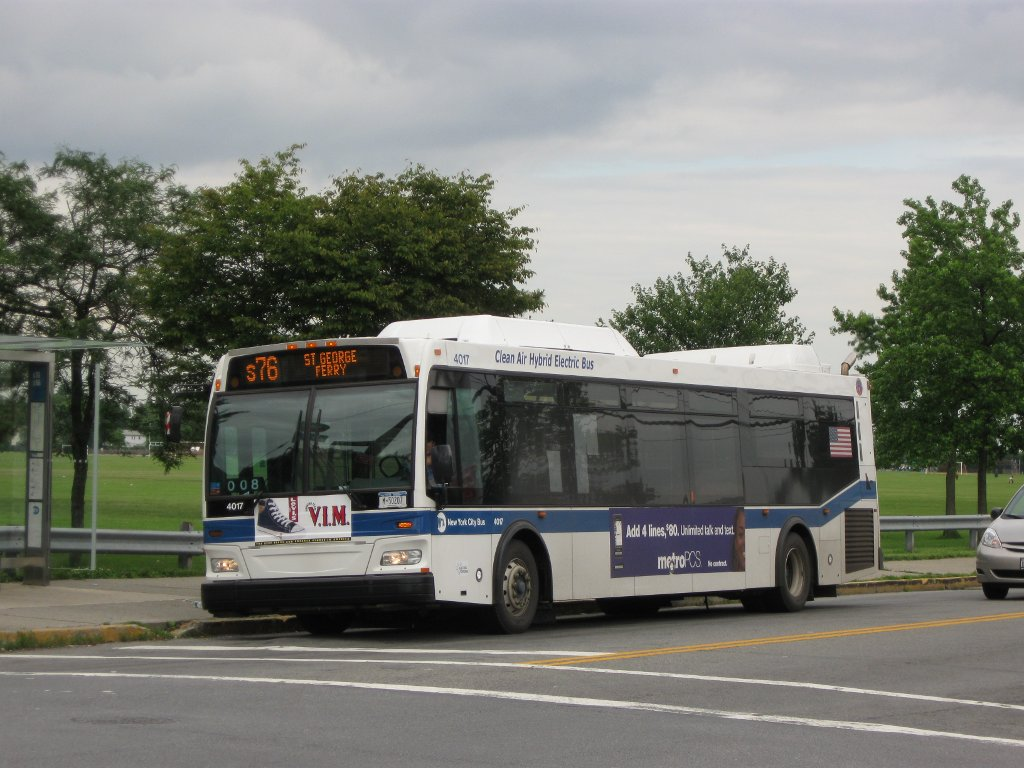
MTA New York City Bus #4017 on the S76 route in New Dorp running along Miller Field.

== In culture ==
In the documentary film, Glory Daze: The Life and Times of Michael Alig (2015), the police recount the discovery, by a group of children at Oakwood Beach, at Miller Field, of a box containing the remains of Andre "Angel" Melendez, in March 1996. (American Justice reports the box was found in April 1996.) Melendez had been murdered by Alig and his roommate, Robert "Freeze" Riggs, his legs dismembered, and his upper body enclosed in a box they enjoined an unwitting taxi driver's help to transport and throw into the Hudson River, near Tunnel nightclub. A tropical storm helped propel the cork-lined, floating box to Staten Island.
