= Andre Melendez =

Murdered dancer and purported drug dealer

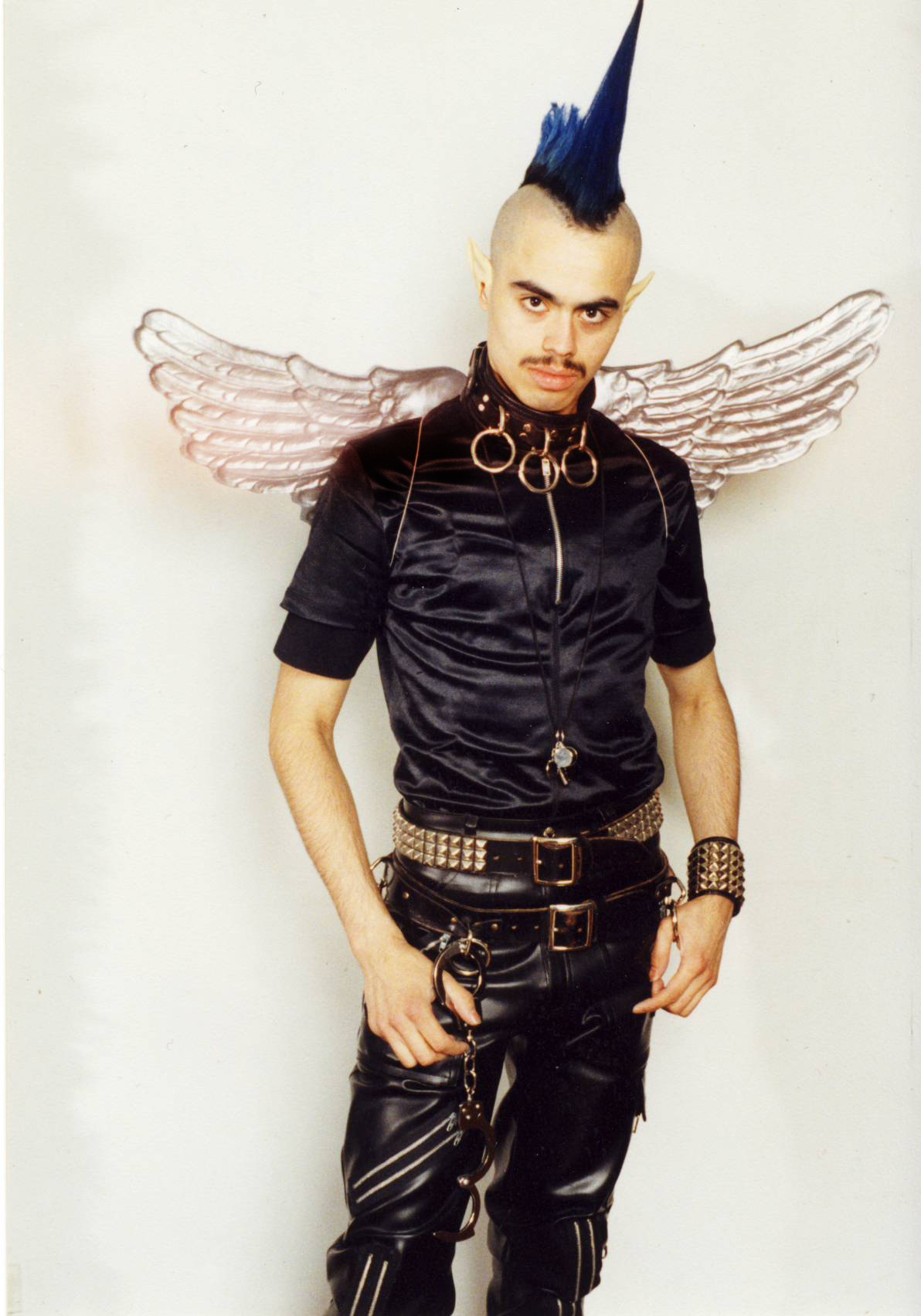
- Born: May 1, 1971; Colombia
- Died: March 17, 1996 (aged 24); New York City
- Occupation: Club Kid
- Known for: New York City nightlife scene; his gruesome murder

Andre "Angel" Melendez (May 1, 1971 – March 17, 1996) was a member of the Club Kids who lived and worked in New York City. He was killed by Michael Alig and Robert "Freeze" Riggs on March 17, 1996. His life and death have inspired several pieces of media, including books, films, music, and television.

== Life ==
Melendez and his family arrived in New York from Colombia when Melendez was eight years old. Melendez purportedly became a drug dealer during the early 1990s after he met Peter Gatien, owner of The Limelight and several other nightclubs in New York City, and became a regular dealer in Gatien's clubs. He was frequently seen at Manhattan clubs wearing his signature feathered wings.

== Death ==
On Sunday, March 17, 1996, Melendez approached Michael Alig and Robert D. "Freeze" Riggs for money Melendez was purportedly owed. According to various statements, the confrontation became violent and Melendez got the better of Alig, who cried out for help. Riggs then hit Melendez on the head with a hammer, three times (until Melendez "went down"), after which Alig smothered him (either with a pillow or sweatshirt, depending upon the source), poured a "cleaner or chemical" into his mouth, then covered Melendez's mouth with duct tape.

Alig and Riggs stripped Melendez's body and placed it in the bathtub, where it remained for 5–7 days. According to Riggs, he then purchased "two chef knives and one cleaver" at Macy's, with which he said Alig dismembered Melendez's legs. The two then wrapped the legs in garbage bags, placed them into individual duffle bags and dumped in the Hudson River.

The following day, Alig and Riggs wrapped the upper body in a sheet and plastic garbage bag, placed it in a cardboard box from which Riggs had removed the UPC, and together took the heavy box down in the elevator and through the main lobby. They then placed it in the trunk of a Yellow Cab "that happened to be right outside the door." Riggs confessed "We took the body to the Westside Highway around 25th Street. The taxi drove off, and we threw the box into the river."

However, Alig gave some conflicting details. For example, he stated he used liquid Drano (and baking soda) to combat the smell of the body. At first, Alig claimed the killing was in self-defense, but he later admitted to having committed manslaughter.

In the documentary film Glory Daze (2015), the police recount the discovery by a group of children at the beach at Miller Field, Staten Island, of a box containing the remains of Melendez, in March 1996. (American Justice reports the box was found in April 1996.) A tropical storm had helped propel the floating, cork-lined box to Staten Island.

Mainstream media began covering Melendez's disappearance when the victim's brother and father turned to the press for help and interest grew in rumors – perpetuated by Alig himself and first publicized to outsiders by Michael Musto as a blind item in his Village Voice column – that Alig and Riggs had murdered Melendez. The coincidental discovery, on Friday, September 8, 1996, of another dismembered body, fished out of the Harlem River at a pier near 134th Street by a homeless woman, sparked police to begin investigating the case in earnest. A police officer in Staten Island, who caught the Melendez media coverage, initiated an investigation of the John Doe found at Miller Field. The Staten Island Police Department used dental records to identify Melendez (whose body the coroner had mis-identified as that of an Asian male); on November 2, 1996, the mutilated corpse was positively identified as Melendez, and details of the rumors about how Melendez was killed were confirmed.

In the face of increasing police scrutiny, Alig fled to Toms River, New Jersey, where he moved into a motel room with his boyfriend, a drug dealer named Brian. On December 5, 1996, the police arrested Alig at the motel and hours later, Riggs in Manhattan. Alig insisted to the police he and Riggs had killed Melendez in self-defense, and disposed of the body in a panic. (This story contrasts sharply with the account Alig had given the victim's brother, John ("Johnny") Melendez, in an August 1996 conversation secretly taped by the District Attorney's office, implicating "Melendez and club czar Gatien in a drug-dealing venture at Gatien's nightspots," and charging "that Riggs killed Melendez for Gatien because 'Peter is in trouble right now for drugs' and 'Angel knew everything and he was threatening to go to...his friend at the Village Voice and tell him all this stuff.") Prosecutors were hesitant to charge Alig with first-degree murder, as they still hoped he would testify against his former boss, Gatien, who had been arrested for allowing drugs to be sold in his nightclubs. They eventually offered both Alig and Riggs a plea deal: a sentence of 10 to 20 years if they accepted the lesser charge of manslaughter. On October 1, 1997, both pleaded guilty and were sentenced to 10 to 20 years. (American Justice reports they pleaded guilty and were sentenced on September 10, 1997.) Because of their convictions, Alig and Riggs were not used as prosecution witnesses in Gatien's trial.

=== Convictions, prison, and aftermath ===
On October 1, 1997, Alig and Riggs were sentenced to 10 to 20 years in prison for Melendez's killing, after each pleaded guilty to one count of manslaughter. Riggs was released on parole in 2010, Alig on May 5, 2014.

On December 24, 2020, Alig died of a drug overdose at the age of 54.

== In popular culture ==
=== Book ===
- James St. James's book, Disco Bloodbath: A Fabulous but True Tale of Murder in Clubland (1999), is about Melendez's murder. It was reprinted with the title Party Monster after the release of the eponymous 2003 film.

=== Films ===
- There are two films based on Melendez's murder and the events which followed:
  - The documentary film Party Monster: The Shockumentary (1998), based on the events leading up to and surrounding the Melendez's murder.
  - The subsequent feature film Party Monster (2003), which stars Wilson Cruz as Melendez
- The documentary film Glory Daze (2015) reviews the creation, rise, and dispersion of the Club Kids phenomenon after Melendez's murder.

=== Music ===
- Melendez's friend Screamin' Rachael wrote the song "Give Me My Freedom/Murder in Clubland." The lyrics to a backward loop in the song include such lines as "Michael, where's Angel?", and "Did someone just cry wolf, or is he dead?"
- A 12 track concept album "a terrible beauty featuring Michael Alig" - www.satorigroup.uk - was produced in 2000 by UK-based the satori group. Track five is titled "BROTHER." The track features, set to music, audio from the documentary "Party Monster," with Johnny, Andre's brother, and his fruitless search, making flyers, and talking to the police, as well as Michael Alig.

=== Television ===
Melendez's murder case has also been featured in multiple TV series, including:

- American Justice: "Dancing, Drugs, and Murder" (2000) on A&E
- Deadly Devotion: "Becoming Angel" (July 16, 2013) on Investigation Discovery
- Notorious
- New York Homicide S3E3 in February 2025 "Killer Club Kids" on Oxygen network
- The 1990s: The Deadliest Decade: “Death of an Angel” (Season 1, Episode 3) (Aired: November 19, 2018) on Investigation Discovery

=== Theatre ===
Clubland: The Monster Pop Party (2013), a musical adaptation of St. James' book Party Monster and its 2003 eponymous film adaptation, debuted April 11, 2013, at the American Repertory Theater's Club Oberon, with book, music, and lyrics by Andrew Barret Cox.
