= Michael Musto =

American journalist

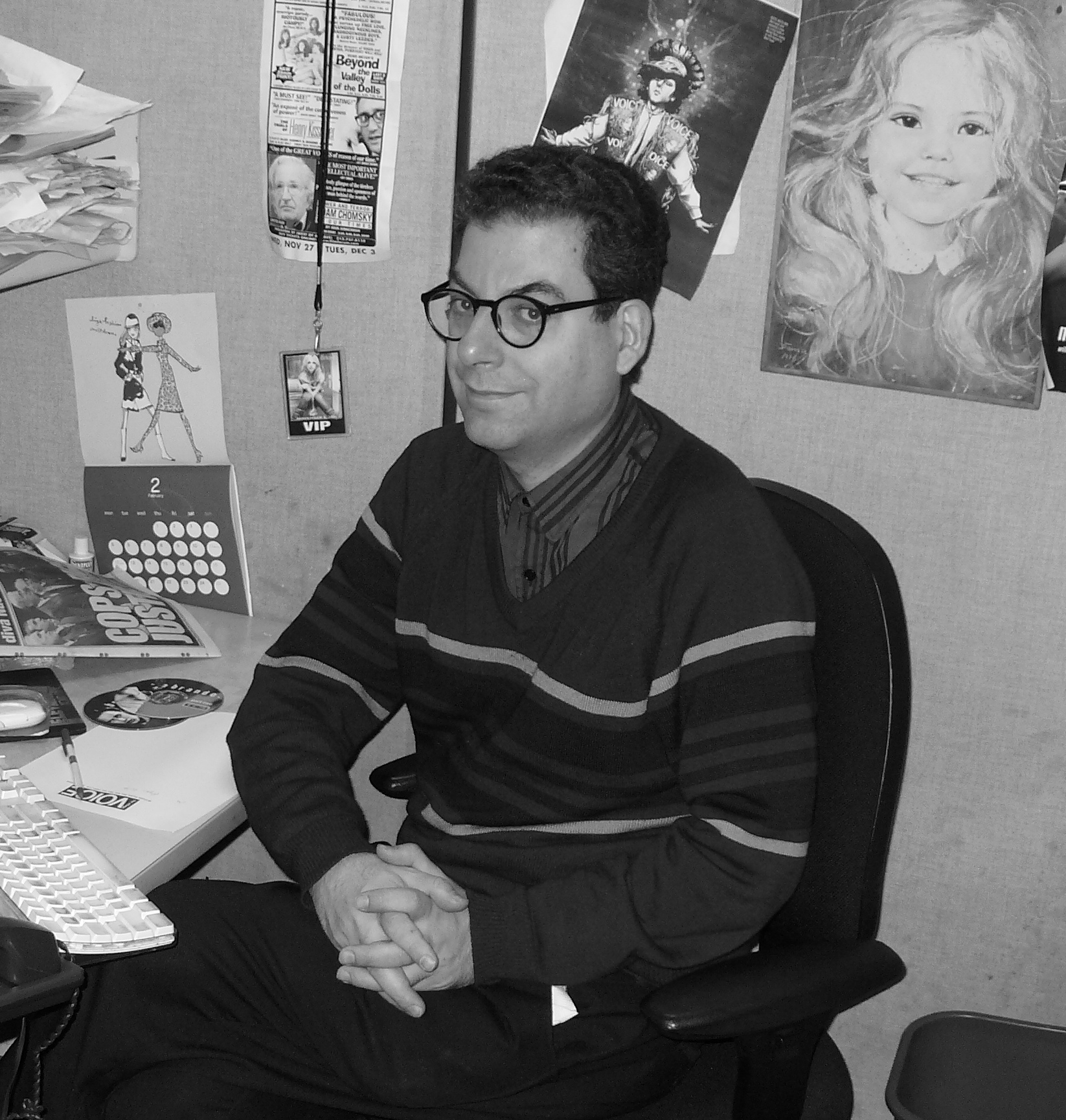
- Michael Musto in 2007
- Born: December 3, 1955 (age 70); Brooklyn, New York, United States
- Education: Columbia University (BA)
- Occupations: Journalist; actor; author
- Website: out.com/entertainment/michael-musto

Michael Musto (born December 3, 1955) is an American journalist who has long been a prevalent presence in entertainment-related publications, as well as on websites and television shows. He is best known as a columnist for The Village Voice, where he wrote the La Dolce Musto column of gossip, nightlife, reviews, interviews, and political observations for almost three decades, starting in 1984. In 2021, he started writing articles about nightlife, movies, theater, NYC, and LGBTQ politics for the revived Village Voice, which returned as a print publication, with accompanying website, and now is web only.

His books are Downtown and Manhattan on the Rocks, as well as a compilation of selected columns published as La Dolce Musto: Writings By The World's Most Outrageous Columnist and a subsequent collection, Fork on the Left, Knife in the Back. He currently writes monthly columns for W42ST.com and LGBTQ Community News.

== Early life ==
Musto was born in Manhattan to an Italian American family. He was raised in Bensonhurst, Brooklyn, and graduated from Columbia University in 1976. During his studies, he was a theater critic for the Columbia Spectator.

== Career ==
Musto is gay and has been published regularly in several LGBT publications, including Out and The Advocate. As of 2016, he lives in Murray Hill, Manhattan.

He contributes to HuffPost, has written the weekly, entertainment-related Musto Unfiltered column for NewNowNext.com, and has had bylines in The New York Times, W, and Vanity Fair.

Among Musto's first journalistic jobs were assignments covering culture for Circus magazine, SoHo Weekly News, and After Dark magazine, as well as becoming the music critic for Us magazine in the 1980s. In 1982, he began writing for Details, then a downtown style-and-nightlife magazine, and in 1984, Musto began his Village Voice column, after having already written features for the publication. Musto's breathlessly dishy and opinionated first-person column celebrated nightlife and LGBT personalities, described outlandish New York club fetes, and gave vital early coverage to up-and-coming performers like John Sex, RuPaul, Kiki and Herb, Bridget Everett, Jackie Hoffman, Bianca Del Rio and Peppermint. A 1989 appearance in Slaves of New York—based on Tama Janowitz's book centered on the New York nightlife scene—was called the film's only moment of credibility by critic J. Hoberman of The Village Voice. Other cameos through the years were made in Garbo Talks (1984), Day of the Dead (1985), Jeffrey (1995), Death of a Dynasty (2003), The Big Gay Musical (2009), Violet Tendencies (2010), and The Smurfs (2011). Larger film roles awaited for more recent films like Vamp Bikers, Japanese Borscht, The Duke of New York, and Mister Sister.

Musto was a friend of the videographer Nelson Sullivan, who filmed much of the footage that exists of the "Club Kids".

Musto also used his column to lambast homophobia and to demand attention to the growing AIDS crisis, Musto joining the activist group ACT UP and engaging in their highly influential rallies and protests. In 2011, The Advocate magazine referred to Musto's "legendary gossip column" and said, "Since 1984, shrewd and self-deprecating humorist Michael Musto has written his 'La Dolce Musto' column, tirelessly chronicling nightlife and celebrity culture. The bridge-burning blogger and baron of blind items has earned a position as both historian and spokesman for the gay community."

In the 1980s, Musto did nightlife-related segments for MTV, where his un-self-conscious gayness seemed radical. Videotographer Nelson Sullivan chose Musto as one of his favorite subjects and relentlessly followed the writer through clubs, appearances, and family get-togethers, many of the videos later surfacing on YouTube. From 1993 to 2000, he was one of the most prominent columnists on The Gossip Show, an E! program which featured colorful reporters relaying celebrity dish, and again, Musto was out and flamboyant on the show. He was featured on the cover of New York magazine in a 1994 "Gossip Mafia" story that spanned New York's most influential tattlers, including Richard Johnson, George Rush, and Jeannette Walls. In 1999, he cohosted "New York Central", a nightly magazine-format show on the Metro Channel.

Musto appeared in drag in a blue dress in the all drag queen music video for Cyndi Lauper's remake of her single "(Hey Now) Girls Just Want To Have Fun" (1994). He has also done cameos in videos by TV on the Radio, Sherry Vine, Sharon Needles, Jinkx Monsoon, Larry Tee, and Gorgon City featuring Jennifer Hudson, among many others.

Musto penned several writeups in The Village Voice about the 1996 murder of Andre "Angel" Melendez, helping bring national attention to a case that resulted in the trial and conviction of Michael Alig and Robert "Freeze" Riggs. He was the first to report Alig's firing from The Limelight club by owner Peter Gatien and to allude to talk about a missing person from Alig's sphere. When his blind item describing the buzz on the details of the crime got picked up by The New York Post's Page Six gossip column, the story took on even more prominence. A later Village Voice feature story acknowledged Musto's breaking item. The movie "Party Monster" (2003) includes reference to a Musto item, and Musto has appeared in many related documentaries, including "Disco Bloodbath" and A&E's "American Justice", as well as several Geraldo Rivera shows, where he had long been the expert on club kids. Discussing topics like gossip and nightlife, Musto also appeared on daytime talk shows hosted by Sally Jessy Raphael, Joan Rivers, Ricki Lake, Richard Bey, Gordon Elliott, and Mark L. Walberg.

In 2001, Musto appeared in a groundbreaking ad campaign for Fortunoff in which he sported a wedding veil, campily promoting the possibility of same-sex marriage.

In 2010, Musto made a cameo appearance in Erasure's re-release of A Little Respect (HMI Redux)'; the proceeds of this release were donated to help students attending the Harvey Milk Institute. Also in 2010, LCD Soundsystem mentioned Musto in the song "Pow Pow" playfully urging him to "Eat it" (wacky retaliation for banter between Musto and the group's James Murphy at a Paper Nightlife Awards ceremony). That year, Musto also coproduced the musical comedy Perfect Harmony about the search for truth, love, and high school a cappella championship glory, which played Off-Broadway in New York City.

In 2011, Musto was named one of the "Out 100" as one of the country's most influential LGBT personalities.

In 2013, he played himself in a scene on the NBC series "Smash", having also previously figured in a plot line involving his gossip writing.

In May 2013, Musto was laid off from The Village Voice, but in 2016, he was back as an entertainment correspondent, writing three cover stories that year. The Village Voice folded, but then it came back in 2021 as a quarterly print publication. Musto was writing for the paper (and the accompanying website) again and when it was web only, he still contributed into 2025.

Musto was a regular commentator on MSNBC's Countdown with Keith Olbermann, where he sardonically skewered the antics of Paris Hilton, Lindsay Lohan, and other scandalous celebrities du jour. Starting in 2015, Musto became a recurring panelist on Logo TV's "Cocktails and Classics", which involved showing well known films and offering campy commentary on them.

He has moderated Broadway talkbacks for shows like Talk Radio and End of the Rainbow, and in 2016, was the celebrity guest star one night in the off-Broadway production of Oh, Hello. In 2026, he was a celebrity guest judge for Cats: The Jellicle Ball.

Musto has also dabbled in acting and singing. In 1980, he became lead singer of a Motown cover band called the Must, and once shared a bill with rising star Madonna. He played a lead role and received rave reviews from Eileen Shapiro of Huffington Post, for the film Vamp Bikers Tres by Eric Rivas, as a head doctor named Hedda Hopper alongside Angel Salazar. The film premiered in 2016 at Anthology Film Archives and in 2018 was released by the Orchard. Musto sang a pop/reggae/dance ditty, "I Got Ur Back", written and produced by Tyler Stone, based on Musto's idea, for Trax Records, released in 2017. A celebrity roast of Musto at Actors Temple on May 22, 2017—kicked off by Rosie O'Donnell and hosted by Bruce Vilanch--raised significant money for the Callen-Lorde clinic. The roast, which was produced by Daniel DeMello and directed by Rachel Klein, featured Bianca Del Rio, Jinkx Monsoon, Judy Gold, Randy Rainbow, and Luann de Lesseps. In addition to doubling the take of the benefit, O'Donnell—after aiming some barbs at Musto's closet-busting mania—thanked him for pulling her into the community; in the 1990s, he'd urged her and Ellen DeGeneres in print to come out of the closet.

He has won 11 Glam Awards for Best Nightlife Writer/Blogger, as well as their Living Legend award. He was named one of Genre magazine's "Men We Love" more than once, won a Lifetime Achievement award at the Gay Expo at Javits Center (2015), was named one of Metrosource magazine's "People We Love" (2019) and got a special award for his work from the Imperial Court of New York, who in 2012, knighted him as "Sir Michael Musto". In 2024, the Jim Owles Liberal Democratic Club honored him with a Human Rights award.

== Published works ==
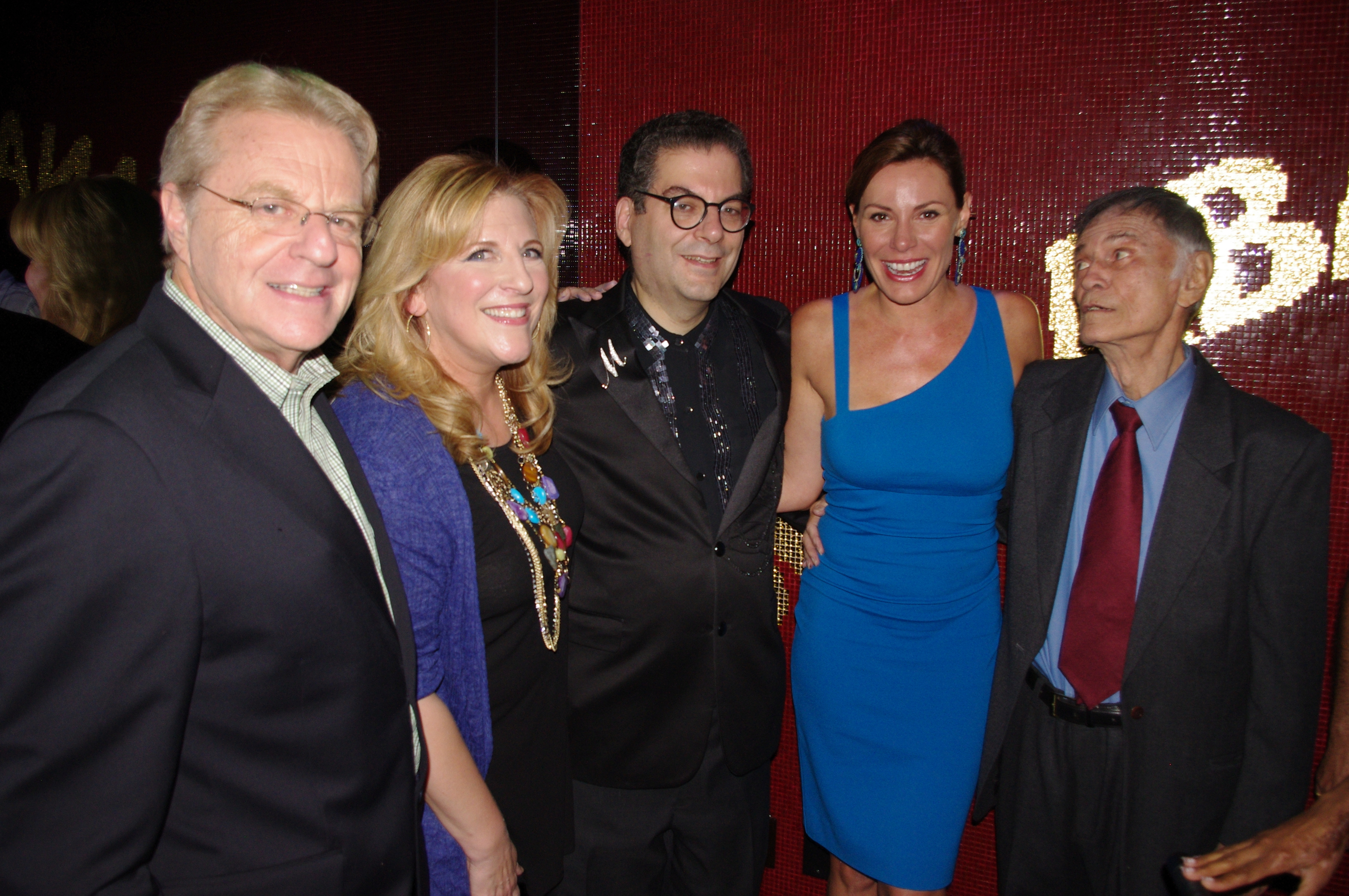
Jerry Springer, Lisa Lampanelli, Musto, Luann de Lesseps and Larry Storch at the 2011 launch party for Musto's book Fork on the Left, Knife in the Back

Books:

- Musto, Michael (June 12, 1986). Downtown-V285. Vintage. ISBN 0-394-74285-0.
- Musto, Michael (September 1989). Manhattan on the Rocks. Henry Holt & Co. ISBN 0-8050-1032-7.
- Musto, Michael (January 1, 2007). La Dolce Musto: Writings by the World's Most Outrageous Columnist. Carroll & Graf. ISBN 978-0-7867-1879-5.
- Musto, Michael (September 1, 2011). Fork on the Left, Knife in the Back. Vantage Point Books.

Contributed to works published by others:

- Boas, Gary Lee (January 2000). Starstruck: Photographs from a Fan. Dilettante Press. ISBN 0-9664272-5-4. Contributed foreword.
- McMullan, Patrick (November 2003). so8os: A Photographic Diary of a Decade. powerHouse Books. ISBN 1-57687-187-8. Contributed as an author.
- Hastreiter, Kim (September 14, 2004). 20 Years of Style: The World According to Paper. Amazon Remainders Account. ISBN 0-06-072302-5. Contributed as an author.
- Haden-Guest, Anthony (October 2, 2006). Disco Years. powerHouse Books. ISBN 1-57687-325-0. Provided afterword.

== See also ==
- LGBT culture in New York City
- List of LGBT people from New York City
- New Yorkers in journalism
