= Invisible-Exports =

Art gallery in New York City

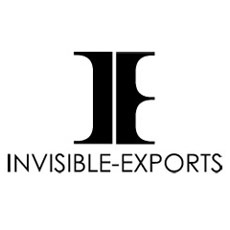
- Logo for Invisible-Exports
- Location: 89 Eldridge Street, Lower East Side, Manhattan, New York City
- Coordinates: 40°43′2.3″N 73°59′33″W
- Type: Contemporary art gallery
- Director: Risa Needleman, Benjamin Tischer
- Website: invisible-exports.com

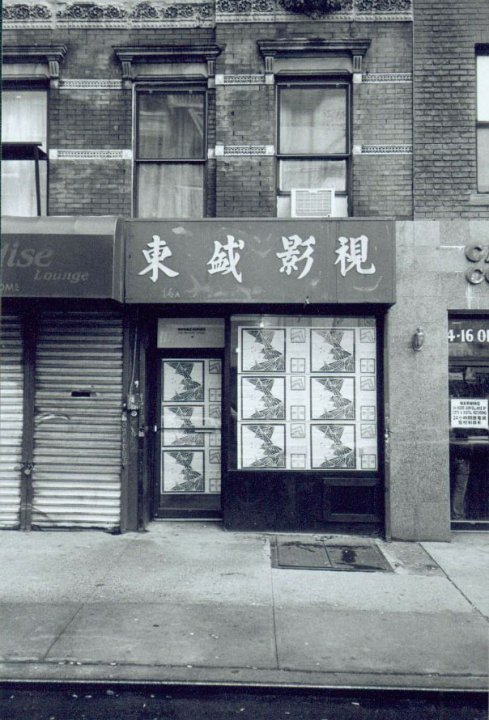
Outside view of the gallery on Orchard Street

Invisible-Exports was a contemporary art gallery located on the Lower East Side of Manhattan, New York. It was co-owned and directed by Risa Needleman and Benjamin Tischer and was recognized for housing provocative and controversial exhibitions. The gallery represented a small roster of avant-garde artists, including iconic artist Genesis P-Orridge. It was part of a network of galleries in the LES, referred to as a "gallery district".

The gallery participated in "Third Thursdays", an initiative instituted by the LES Business Improvement District that sought to elevate interest in the area by encouraging galleries to stay open until 9 pm on the third Thursday of every month.

The gallery closed in March 2019.

== Represented artists ==
- Genesis P-Orridge
- Walt Cassidy
- Scott Treleaven

== Solo exhibitions ==
- 2008: Mickey Smith, You People
- 2009: Paul Gabrielli, Closer Than That
- 2009: Lisa Kirk, House of Cards
- 2009: Michael Bilsborough, The Only Way Out is Through
- 2009: Jana Leo, Rape New York
- 2009: Genesis P-Orridge, 30 Years of Being Cut Up
- 2009: Stephen Irwin, Sometimes When We Touch
- 2009: Paul Gabrielli, NADA Art Fair
- 2010: Lucas Ajemian and Julien Bismuth, Les Tristes
- 2010: Mickey Smith, Volta NY
- 2010: Walt Cassidy, The Protective Motif
- 2010: Lisa Kirk, Revolution! (SmartSpaces)
- 2010: Breyer P-Orridge, Watermill Center
- 2010: Mickey Smith, Believe You Me
- 2010: Lucas Ajemian and Julien Bismuth, EAB Fair
- 2010: Breyer P-Orridge, NADA Art Fair
- 2011: Breyer P-Orridge, Moving Image
- 2011: Paul Gabrielli, Generally
- 2011: Matthew Porter, The Undefeated
