= Aron Siegel =

American film producer

Aron Siegel, producer, at Dragon Con in Atlanta Ga September 5 2026

Aron "Bugsy" Siegel (born December 9, 1962) is a film producer, film location sound recordist, TV producer, record producer, remixer, and club DJ/VJ.

== Career ==
Aron Siegel was one of the youngest associate producers of a regional Emmy winning television show, SUPER 2 on WSB-TV in Atlanta, Georgia. He further established himself both as a film critic and nightclub DJ as a teenager by submitting reviews to Purple Cow Teen Tabloid and working shifts at Chancellors nightclub. He was the first DJ to bring edits and remixes of songs to Z-93, WZGC FM in Atlanta, to be aired as exclusive versions on the radio station.

Aron enjoyed the longest run of employment at his home nightclub, The Cove, of any DJ in the Southeast United States where he worked from 1982 until 1994. During that time, Aron assisted longtime club-owner Peter Gatien (Limelight Atlanta, Limelight New York, Limelight Chicago, Limelight London) by finding the location for Gatien's latest Atlanta nightclub, Petrus, which is now known as Club Opera. Aron introduced the Video Dance club concept to the Atlanta community when he and his business partner, Randy Dethman, converted The Cove into a video dance club in the late 1980s. Aron debuted music videos including Madonna's "Vogue" and "Supermodel" by Ru Paul.

Aron is named #35 of the World's 100 Best Disco DJs by Jan Yahu Pawul in his e-book about DISCOTHEQUE PIONEERS. He is a featured DJ in "The Original 'Disco Museum!"

As a producer, remixer, and DJ, Aron has worked with Oscar winner Trent Reznor of Nine Inch Nails, Debbie Gibson, Grace Jones, Ru Paul Charles, Jayne Doe and others. He became the official in-house remixer/producer for Hot Hits Records created and owned by Alan White (disc jockey). Through Siegel's association with Alan White, he helped produce The Atlanta All-stars LP, a compilation of several songs by Atlanta recording artists.

In 1994, Aron's music and television background led him and Randy Dethman to produce 70’s Dance Party, a seven-part television show with fashions, prizes, and music paying tribute to the 1970s Disco era of Dance Music. Recording artist Alicia Bridges, most notable for her hit "I Love the Nightlife", also appeared on the show.

While producing 70's Dance Party, Aron re-introduced the music of the 1970s into Atlanta's Metro Video Bar sparking the RETRO era in the '90s nightclub scene as reported by Newsweek Magazine.

Since 1992, Aron continues to produce and co-host Film Forum, a thirty-minute magazine-style television show about the film industry.

As of 2008, Aron has over 40 credits for film location sound recording including Magnolia Pictures’ The Signal which screened at Sundance Film Festival in 2007.

In January 2008, Aron produced his first short film, Foreign Exchange (2009), which was the first short narrative to be photographed using the RED camera from the Red Digital Cinema Camera Company in the Atlanta area.

Currently, Aron Siegel is the owner and operator of Regal Noise Inc., an audio recording and music production studio that specializes in dealing with major feature films, television shows, commercials, music videos, independent features, individual song production, and more. Additional work by Siegel can be found on his SoundCloud account.
