= Andrew Barret Cox =

American musician and creative

- Born: July 30, 1991 (age 35)
- Education: Emerson College
- Occupations: musician, choreographer, producer, costume designer
- Known for: Clubland; Oscar At The Crown; Apocalypse Noir
- Website: www.andrewbarretcox.com

Andrew Barret Cox is an American musician, choreographer, producer, and costume designer based in New York City.

== Career ==
Cox has worked across a variety of projects.

=== Clubland (2013) ===
In 2013, Cox published a musical titled Clubland: The Monster Pop Party, based on the life of infamous Club Kid Michael Alig and adapted from James St. James' book Party Monster. It debuted on April 11, 2013, at the American Repertory Theater's Club Oberon. Cox wrote 11 original songs (featuring on the concept album Clubland) and produced, with Jan Sport starring as Alig.

=== Oscar At The Crown (2015) ===
In 2013, during his study at Harvard University, Cox's close friend Mark Mauriello wrote and produced a show titled Julie Cooper: Genesis Prayer, featuring the named character from TV show The OC and exploring themes of icon worship in contemporary media.

This work underwent further development by The Neon Coven, a creative collaboration between Mauriello, Cox, and Shira Milikowsky. In 2015, the first showing of their new musical was held: Oscar At The Crown And The Love That Dare Not Speak Its Name. This first workshop at Oberon, followed by a Lot45 workshop in 2017, gave rise to a full run of the show at 3 Dollar Bill, now simply titled Oscar At The Crown, in 2019.

The show featured a modern retelling of Oscar Wilde's life through a post-apocalyptic lens which incorporated themes from Julie Cooper: Genesis Prayer, including a 9-minute song titled Julie.

In 2023, Oscar At The Crown ran at the Edinburgh Fringe, and in 2025, a full production was performed in London in a custom "bunker" venue on Tottenham Court Road.

=== Apocalypse Noir (2021) ===
In 2021, Cox launched Apocalypse Noir, a project centered around performers he had worked with closely over the years. In particular, the regular rotation includes Jan Sport, Loosey LaDuca, Danielle Lussier, Hayley Moir, Brandon Looney, Megan Dwinell, and Kelly McIntyre. The group host regular shows, often with guest artists, at Balcon Salon every Monday night, and tour to other events across the United States.

In early 2025, less than 24 hours after the release of Lady Gaga's "Abracadabra", Apocalypse Noir debuted a fully produced performance of the song, including vocals, costumes, and choreography. The feat went viral, with Billboard commenting: "The devil works hard, but drag superstar Jan Sport and musician/producer Andrew Barret Cox both work harder."

== Discography ==
=== Singles ===
- "Amethyst & Diamond" (2015)
- "Feasting With Panthers" (2015)
- "Not Here" (2015)
- "Slag Wars" (with The Cock Destroyers and Jan, featuring Mark Mauriello and Hayley Moir) (2020)
- "Jantasy" (with Jan) (2021)
- "Hologram" (with Jan) (2022)
- "Erika Jayne" (2022)
- "Let Loose" (with Loosey LaDuca, Hayley Moir and Kelly McIntyre) (2023)
- "Love Me Like My Demons" (2023)
- "Let Loose (Andrew's Angels Edition)" (with Lemon, Jan and Loosey LaDuca) (2023)
- "Miami Dolls" (with Danielle Lussier, and featuring Hayley Moir and Kelly McIntyre) (2023)
- "Don't Just Say" (with Matthew Camp) (2023)
- "We Just Wanna Dance" (with Devin Lewis) (2023)
- "Crystal Tokyo" (with Jan and Kelly McIntyre) (2023)
- "Pretty In Pink" (with Jan) (2024)
- "Super Nintendo" (2024)
- "Call Of The Wild (from "Oscar At The Crown")" (with Jan) (2025)
- "No Escaping The Night" (featuring Jan) (2025)
- "Last Christmas" (with Jan) (2025)

=== Albums ===
- "Clubland" (with Tony Clements, Eric Maxwell, Jan, Hayley Moir, Katie Baroff, Jess Harte and Danielle Lussier) (2013)
- "Oscar At The Crown" (with Page Axelson, Kelly McIntyre, Danielle Lussier, Zofia Weretka, Jada Temple, Kerri George, Mark Mauriello, Tony Clements, Brandon Looney, Hayley Moir, Eric Maxwell and David Merino) (2019)
- "Save Betsy (Demo Concept Album)" (as Apocalypse Noir, with Danielle Lussier, Jan Sport, Kelly McIntyre and Meg Dwinell) (2026)

== See also ==
- LGBTQ culture in New York City
- List of LGBTQ people from New York City
