= Tunnel (New York nightclub) =

Nightclub in New York City (1986–2001)

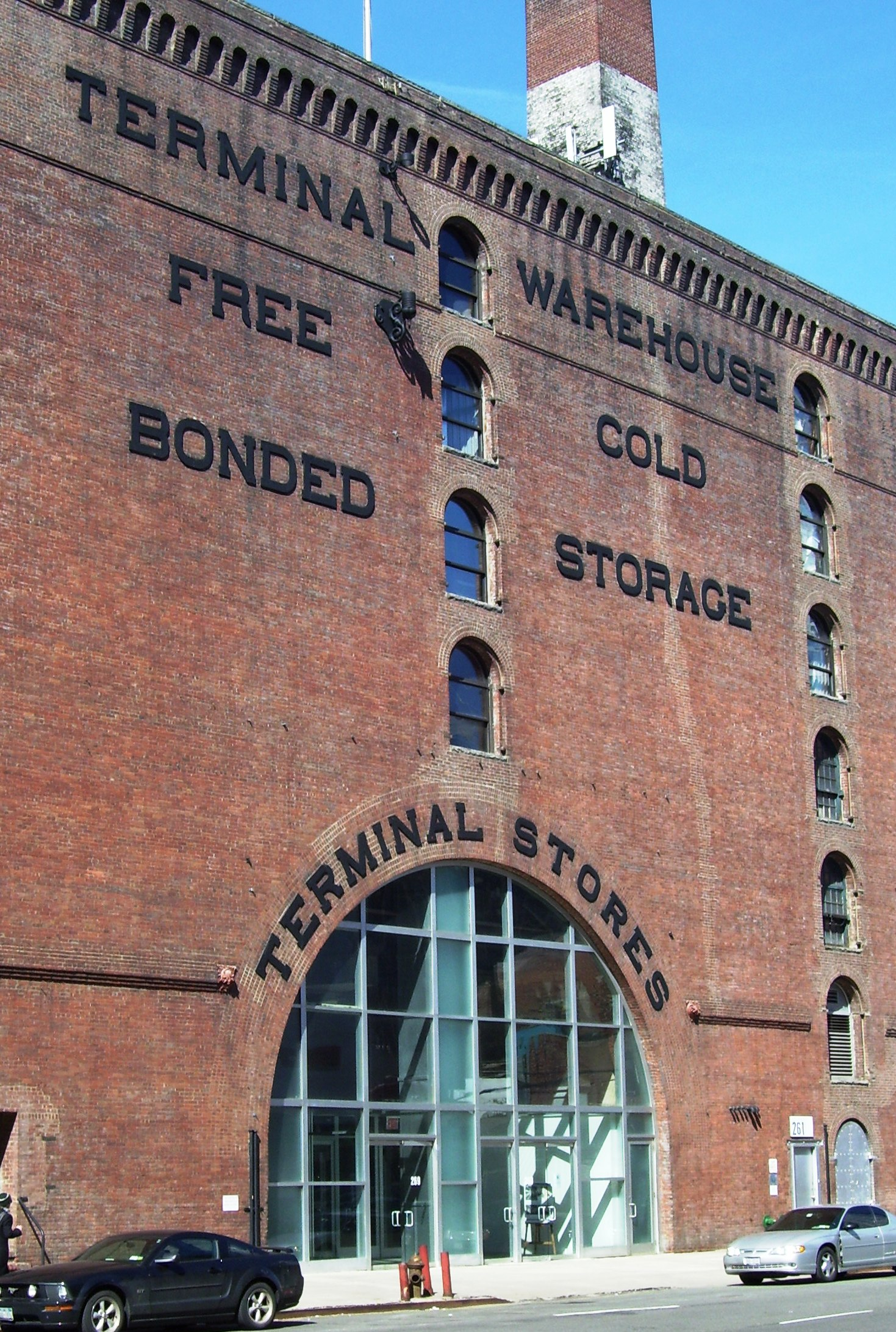
- View of The Terminal Warehouse Central Stores Building from Eleventh Avenue
- Interactive map of Tunnel
- Address: 220 Twelfth Avenue; New York City; United States
- Coordinates: 40°45′9″N 74°0′27″W
- Type: Nightclub

Construction
- Opened: 1986
- Closed: 2001

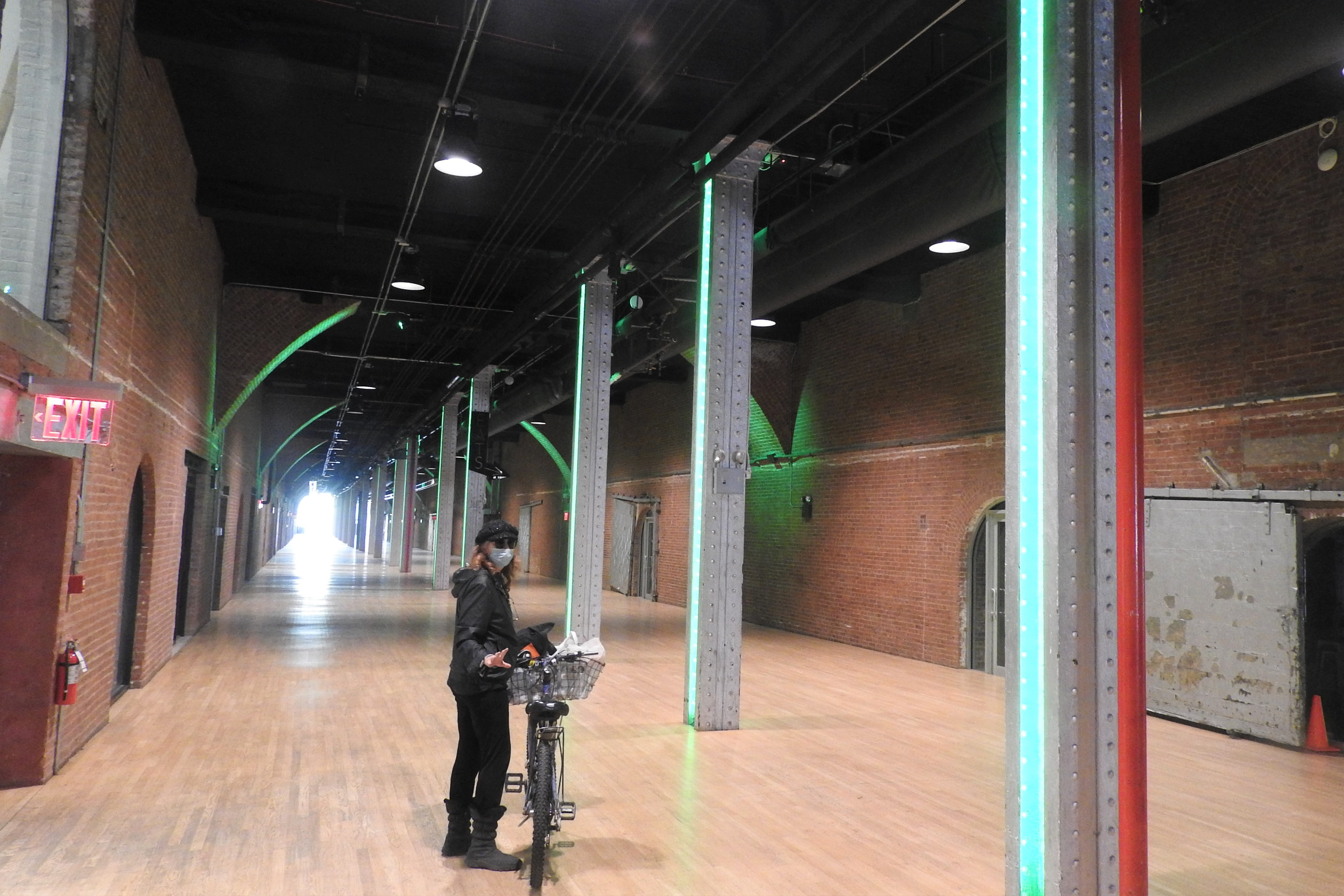
Lobby

Tunnel was a nightclub located at 220 Twelfth Avenue (between 27th and 28th Streets), in the Chelsea neighborhood of Manhattan, New York City. It operated from 1986 to 2001.

The nightclub was located within the Terminal Warehouse Company Central Stores Building, also known as Chelsea Terminal Warehouse, which is now part of the West Chelsea Historic District.

== History ==
Tunnel, also known as The Tunnel, was owned by Boaz Aharoni, a real-estate developer, and Elli Dayan, founder and former chairman of Bonjour International, a company best known for blue jeans. The club was built in a space which was formerly a railroad freight terminal. Dayan sold the property to Marco Riccota in January 1990. Party promoter Peter Gatien acquired nightclub in 1992.

Tunnel closed late in 2001 due to non-payment of rent and New York City Mayor Rudy Giuliani's quality-of-life campaign. Gatien had been accused of drug trafficking, charges he was acquitted of, although he and his wife pleaded guilty to tax evasion and were deported to Canada in 2003.

== Description ==
The club was named for the tunnel-like shape of the main room, in which train tracks from the early 1900s ran through a sunken area of the dance floor. These were a relic of an era in which railroad sidings from the Eleventh Avenue freight line of the New York Central Railroad ran directly into warehouse buildings in that area, so that goods could be transferred to and from freight cars which crossed the Hudson River on car floats from Hoboken, New Jersey.

The club was architecturally distinctive: a long, narrow space with multiple rooms on several levels. The dance floor featured several dance cages. The decor of the club changed frequently. One room, decorated by artist Kenny Scharf, was called the Kenny Scharf Lava Lounge. Others were decorated as Victorian libraries, S/M dungeons, and lounges.

The club featured unisex bathrooms, which were the converted locker rooms formerly used by the freight terminal's workers. They had modern stalls with partitions and doors for privacy, extant rows of old lockers attached to the wall, as well as marks where the former shower stalls had been removed. In the late 1980s, Club Kids, including Michael Alig, Amanda Lepore, and RuPaul, often gathered in the V.I.P. room in the basement.

During its lifespan, Tunnel frequently hosted Johnny Dynell and Roman Ricardo in the late 1980s and into the early 1990s. More DJs included Junior Vasquez, Danny Tenaglia, Jonathan Peters, Peregrine Hood, Little Louie Vega, DJ Renegade, Eddie Baez, DJ Justin Time, DJ Cliffy D, DJ J-Smooth, DJ Corbett, DJ DA, Bobby Rios and Hex Hector after the close of the original Sound Factory in the mid-1990s. It later presented Kurfew, a trance-techno oriented Saturday night party started by promoter Jeff Brenner and hosted by talent such as Lady Bunny, DJ Urbanox, Peppermint, Social influencer Charles Winters (of GaySocialites.com), DJ Vito Fun, DJ Redstar (DJ Chris Sharpe on WLIR), DJ Michael T, Amanda Lepore, DJ Jason, and DJ Steve Sidewalk.

Tunnel introduced young clubbers to talent including Danny Tenaglia, Jonny McGovern, and Cazwell (as Morplay). Doorman Fernando Sarralha was the keeper of the velvet rope. While the club attracted primarily gay audiences, it also attracted members of the hip-hop community. One advantage of the multiple rooms of the club was the ability to host different types of parties, with as many as five or more DJs spinning different styles of music to varying crowds. In 1998, DJ Amadeus was named the resident DJ at Tunnel.

== In popular culture ==
Celebrities

- Actor Vin Diesel once worked as a bouncer at Tunnel.
- Tunnel was one of the clubs promoted by Michael Alig and a hangout of the Club Kids, before Alig's conviction and subsequent incarceration for murdering Andre "Angel" Melendez.

Films

- Tunnel is the location of the aliens' dance sequence in Richard W. Haines' film Alien Space Avenger (1989).
- Tunnel is the location of the opening sequence in Hype Williams' film Belly (1998).
- Tunnel was used for a scene in the movie Vampire's Kiss (1988), filmed between August and October 1987.
- The interior of Tunnel was used for the 'ghost train' scene of Ghostbusters II.
- A scene from Larry Clark's film Kids (1995) was shot at Tunnel in the summer of 1994.
- In the documentary film, Glory Daze: The Life and Times of Michael Alig (2015), Michael Alig recounts having enjoined the help of an unwitting taxi driver to help him and his co-killer Robert D. "Freeze" Riggs transport and throw into the river, near Tunnel, the box containing the upper body remains of Andre "Angel" Melendez.
- A scene from Straight Outta Compton (2015) shows Eazy-E meeting up with Ice Cube in a club; in a radio interview, Ice Cube says the club in question was Tunnel.

Literature

- In Bret Easton Ellis' novel, American Psycho (1991), the club is frequented by Patrick Bateman and his associates as a trendy place to bring women or to purchase cocaine.

Music

- Tunnel was the featured location in Johnny Kemp's video for his classic hit single "Just Got Paid" (1987).
- The rap group Onyx released a song called "The Tunnel" on their album Wakedafucup (2014), detailing their history with the historic night club.
- Tunnel is featured in Queen Pen's hit single, "Party Ain't A Party", in the lyric: "catch me on the rebound, or maybe at the Tunnel".
- Tunnel is referenced in Mobb Deep's track "The Infamous Prelude" off their seminal album, The Infamous (1995).
- The music video for DMX's debut single "Get at Me Dog" was filmed at Tunnel.
- Tunnel is referenced in Jayo Felony's hit single "Whatcha Gonna Do", in the lyric "Went to the Tunnel and brought down the roof".
- Tunnel is referenced in Nas's track "Blue Benz" off his thirteenth studio album, King's Disease (2020).

Television

- In the HBO television series Sex and the City episode "Coulda, Woulda, Shoulda", Carrie Bradshaw discusses having a "drunken night" at Tunnel at age 22, which resulted in an unplanned pregnancy. In the episode "Splat!", Lexi Featherston mentions that she used to go to Tunnel with Carrie in her youth.

== See also ==
- List of electronic dance music venues
- List of nightclubs in New York City
