= Party Monster: The Shockumentary =

- DVD cover
- Directed by: Fenton Bailey; Randy Barbato
- Starring: Michael Alig; Gitsie; James St. James; Keoki; Eric Bernat (as Freeze)
- Production company: World of Wonder
- Distributed by: Picture This! Entertainment
- Release date: 1998
- Running time: 57 minutes
- Country: United States
- Language: English

Party Monster: The Shockumentary is a 1998 documentary film detailing the rise of the club kid phenomenon in New York City, the life of club kid and party promoter Michael Alig, and Alig's murder (with the help of Robert D. "Freeze" Riggs) of fellow club kid and drug dealer Andre "Angel" Melendez. It was directed by Fenton Bailey and Randy Barbato.

== Description ==
Produced by World of Wonder and based in part on the James St. James' memoir, Disco Bloodbath: A Fabulous but True Tale of Murder in Clubland (1999), the film combines interview footage of Alig from prison, St. James, scene watchers like Michael Musto, commentary by Alig's mother, and a number of other former club kids with archival footage from various parties, and dramatic re-enactments. The book and the film also served as the basis for the 2003 feature film, Party Monster.

Party Monster: The Shockumentary played a number of film festivals, including the 1999 Sundance Film Festival.
