= Peter Gatien =

Canadian club owner and party promoter (born 1952)

- Born: August 8, 1952 (age 73); Cornwall, Ontario, Canada
- Occupations: Club owner, party promoter
- Spouse(s): Alessandra Gatien, Adrien Gatien, Sheila Gatien

Peter Gatien (born August 8, 1952) is a Canadian club owner and party promoter. He is best known as the former owner of several prominent New York City nightclubs, including Club USA, The Limelight, Palladium, and Tunnel.

== Life and career ==
Gatien was born in Cornwall, Ontario, the third of five brothers. His first business venture was a jeans store in his home town, which he opened with a $13,000 settlement after he lost an eye in a hockey accident. After that, he turned a former country western bar into a rock club called Aardvark and booked the band Rush to perform.

In 1976, he read about a bankrupt nightclub in Florida known as Rumbottoms. The space became the first incarnation of The Limelight. Limelight Atlanta followed. The longest period of time in which The Limelight remained closed was from 1996 to 1998. It reopened from 1998 until Gatien sold it in 2001, to a real estate developer.

Gatien served as executive producer of the film A Bronx Tale (1993), starring Robert De Niro, after having produced it as a one-man play starring Chazz Palminteri.

A 1996 federal investigation attempted but failed to link Gatien to the sales of party drugs, especially ecstasy, in his clubs. His acquittal in 1998 left him with huge legal fees.

He was later arrested on tax evasion charges after a series of club raids. He was acquitted of most of the charges. He pleaded guilty to tax evasion in 1999. He was fined $1.6 million and given a 60-day prison sentence, with 5 years' probation.

In 2003, he was deported to his native Canada, under the Department of Homeland Security immigration laws which order the removal of any alien (non-citizen) convicted of a felony. Because of his partial Indigenous ancestry, Gatien has since been able to visit the United States again.

Gatien relocated to Toronto, where he opened a 55,000-square-foot (5,100 m^{2}) entertainment venue, Circa. By 2009, he was no longer involved with Circa and has been out of the nightclub business since that time. Circa was forced into bankruptcy and closed in March 2010.

== In popular culture ==
=== Books ===
- Gatien and the histories of his clubs are discussed at length in the book The Last Party: Studio 54, Disco, and the Culture of the Night, by Anthony Haden-Guest. Haden-Guest's book chronicles the history of New York nightlife and all the significant people and events that impacted its evolution from Studio 54 through to the days of Club USA, The Limelight, Palladium, and Tunnel.
- Gatien is a prominent character in two books about scandals involving former club promoter Michael Alig, including:
  - Disco Bloodbath: A Fabulous but True Tale of Murder in Clubland (1999) by James St. James
  - Clubland Confidential: The Fabulous Rise and Murderous Fall of Club Culture (2003) by Frank Owen

=== Films ===
- St. James' book, Disco Bloodbath, was later made into two films:
  - Party Monster: The Shockumentary (1998), a documentary
  - Party Monster (2003), a feature film starring Macaulay Culkin as Michael Alig, and Seth Green as James St. James, that chronicles the events leading up to the murder of Angel Melendez, committed by Michael Alig and his roommate, Robert D. "Freeze" Riggs. Gatien is played by Dylan McDermott.
- Gatien's daughter, Jen Gatien, produced the documentary Limelight (2011), about New York City night life in the 1990s, and the rise and fall of her father's club empire.

=== Toys ===
- In 2007, Gatien was made into a Dunny, a type of vinyl designer toy.

=== Music ===
- Gatien is mentioned in the song, "The Fun Lovin' Criminal" by The Fun Lovin' Criminals: "I am always optimistic about human relations, I got more friends than my man Peter Gatien"
- He is also mentioned in the song, "Foundation" by Jay-Z, who raps: "Me and my operation, running New York nightscene, with one eye closed, like Peter Gatien"
- He is also mentioned in the song, "Dynasty" by The Diplomats: "Meet Jimmy Iovine, give me my cream Shapiro, Peter Gatien, relation Spot a club in L.A just to touch it up"

== See also ==
- Club Kids
