= Michael Alig =

American club promoter socialite

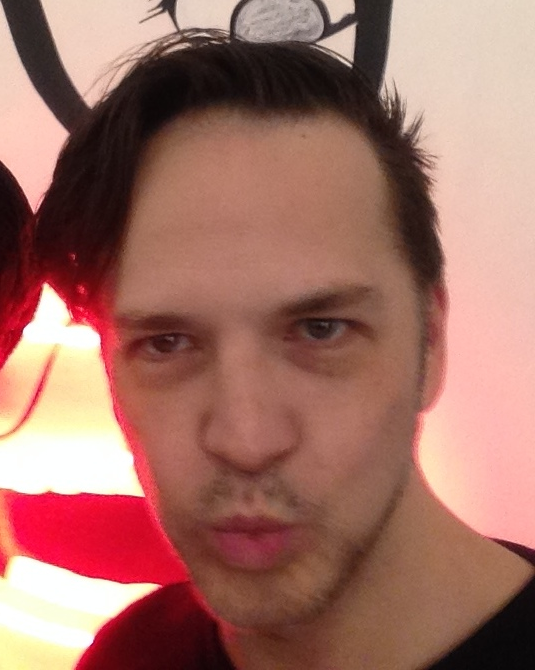
- Alig in 2015
- Born: April 29, 1966; South Bend, Indiana, U.S.
- Died: December 24, 2020 (aged 54); New York City, U.S.
- Occupation: Club promoter
- Status: Deceased
- Conviction: First degree manslaughter
- Penalty: 10 to 20 years imprisonment

Details
- Victims: Andre "Angel" Melendez
- Date: March 17, 1996
- Country: United States
- State: New York
- Location: New York City
- Date apprehended: November 1996

Michael Alig (April 29, 1966 – December 24, 2020) was an American club promoter who was convicted of felony manslaughter. He was one of the ringleaders of the Club Kids, a group of young New York City clubgoers who became a cultural phenomenon in the late 1980s and early 1990s. In March 1996, Alig and his roommate, Robert D. "Freeze" Riggs, killed fellow Club Kid Andre "Angel" Melendez in a confrontation over a drug debt. In October 1997, Alig pleaded guilty to first-degree manslaughter. Both men were sentenced to 10 to 20 years in prison. Riggs was released on parole in 2010. Alig was released on May 5, 2014.

On Christmas Eve, 2020, shortly before midnight, Alig died at his Washington Heights home from an accidental drug overdose at the age of 54.

== Early years ==
Born and raised in South Bend, Indiana, Michael Alig was the second of two sons born to John and Elke Alig. His mother, a native of Bremerhaven, Germany, moved to the United States after marrying his father, a computer programmer. The couple divorced when Alig was four years old.

Alig attended Grissom Middle School and Penn High School, where he was a straight-A student and graduated in the top 8% of his class. During his teenage years, Alig reported that he was often bullied because of his homosexuality. Seeking a less conservative social environment after graduating in 1984, he attended Fordham University in New York City. He studied architecture there before transferring to the Fashion Institute of Technology. There, he met the boyfriend of artist Keith Haring, who introduced Alig to New York City nightlife. Alig soon dropped out of school and began working at Danceteria as a bus boy.

== Underground club scene ==
=== Alig's Club Kids ===
While working at Danceteria, Alig studied the nightclub business and soon became a party promoter. His ability to stage memorable parties helped him rise in New York's party scene. During this time, Alig and other regular clubgoers began creating flamboyant personas, and later became known as "Club Kids". The Club Kids wore outrageous costumes that former Club Kid and celebutante James St. James later described as "part drag, part clown, part infantilism". They were also known for their frequent use of ketamine (known as Special K), Ecstasy, Rohypnol, heroin, and cocaine. Alig's Club Kids included (among others): "Astro Erle", "Ernie Glam", "Gitsie", "Jennytalia", "Superstar DJ Keoki", Amanda Lepore, Charlie "Dash" Prestano, Joshua Davis, "Richie Rich", Robert "Freeze" Riggs, RuPaul, and "Walt Paper". The Club Kids' outrageousness became a source of interest for the media, and articles about them appeared in such media outlets as Newsweek, People, and TIME. They also appeared on Donahue, Geraldo, and The Joan Rivers Show.

In 1988, Alig was hired by Peter Gatien, the owner of The Limelight. Alig's parties at The Limelight were such a hit that he began organizing parties for Gatien's other clubs: Club USA, the Palladium, and Tunnel. Alig's notorious "Outlaw Parties", which were thrown in various unconventional places including a McDonalds, a Dunkin' Donuts, abandoned houses, and a subway, helped to revitalize the downtown New York City club scene which Village Voice columnist Michael Musto declared had atrophied after artist Andy Warhol died in 1987.

Alig's parties also became notorious due in part to his own "bad behavior". Alig would throw $100 bills on crowded dance floors just to watch people scramble for them. In other instances, he would urinate on clubgoers or urinate in their drinks, and would engage in stage falls wherein he knocked others to the ground.

As Alig's popularity in the club scene grew, so did his drug use. He was arrested several times for drug offenses and entered rehab, but continued to use drugs. In 1995, his boss, Gatien, sent Alig to rehab once again. Alig later claimed that after he completed his stint and was released, Gatien fired him.

Some of Alig's behavior could be explained by a personality disorder. He reported being diagnosed with histrionic personality disorder, which is characterized by high levels of attention-seeking behavior, stating: "The doctor said I was the most extreme case he'd ever seen. Everything has to be completely over the top and exaggerated. It worked well for my job – I was a promoter."

== Killing of Angel Melendez ==
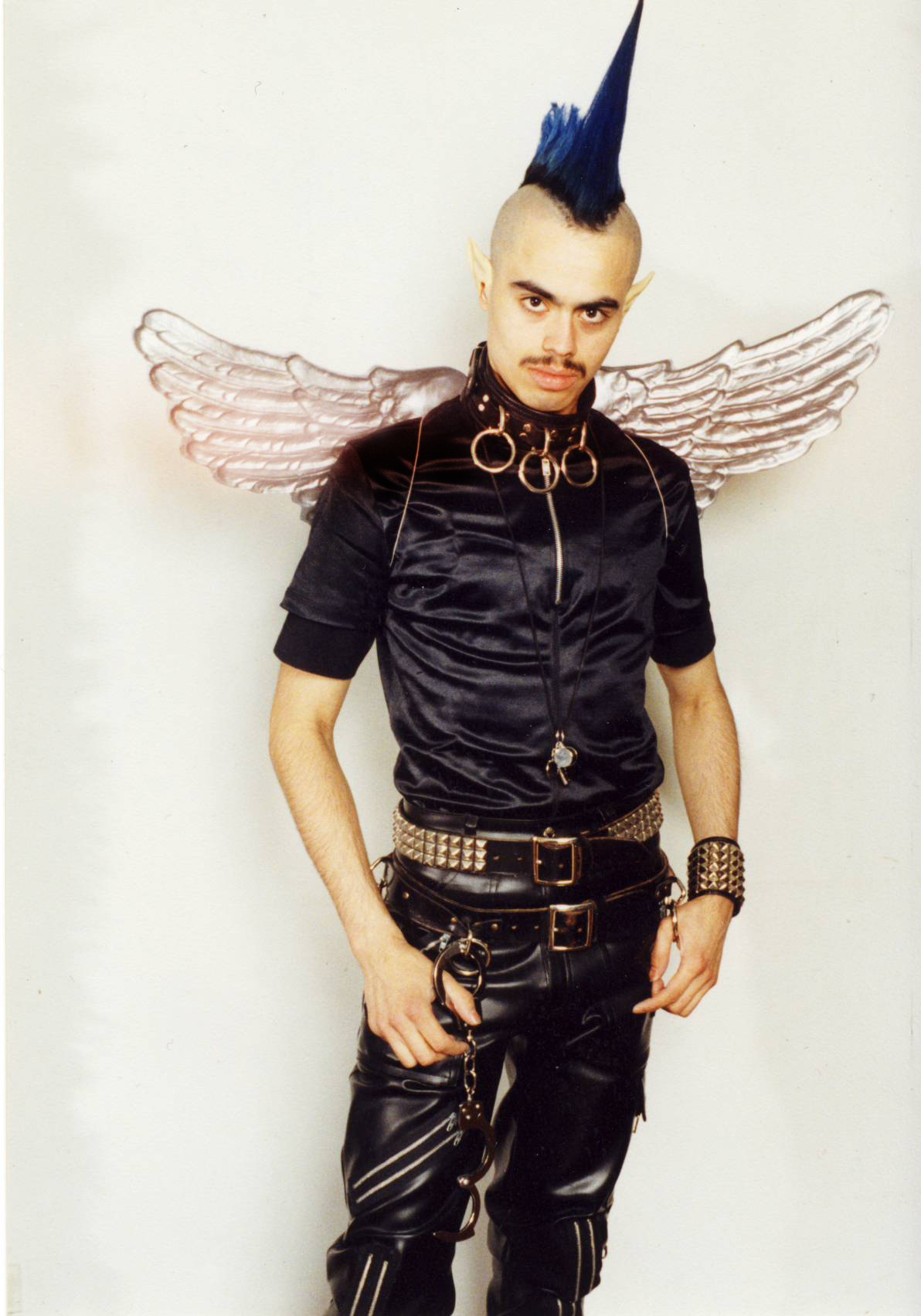
Alig and Riggs killed Angel Melendez (pictured) and dismembered his body

Andre "Angel" Melendez was a regular on the New York City club scene and worked at The Limelight, among other clubs (some not owned by Gatien, e.g., Webster Hall), where he sold drugs on the premises. After The Limelight was closed by federal agents and an investigation found that Gatien was allowing drugs to be sold there, Melendez was fired. Shortly thereafter, he moved into Alig's Riverbank West apartment. On the night of March 17, 1996, Alig and his roommate, Robert D. "Freeze" Riggs, killed Melendez after an argument in Alig's apartment over many things, including a long-standing drug debt. Alig claimed many times that he was so high on drugs that his memory of the events was unclear.

After Melendez's death, Alig and Riggs did not know what to do with the body. They initially left it in the bathtub, which they filled with ice. After a few days, the body began to decompose and became malodorous. After discussing what to do with Melendez's body and who should do it, Riggs went to Macy's to buy knives and a box. In exchange for 10 bags of heroin, Alig agreed to dismember Melendez's body. He cut his legs off and put them each in a separate garbage bag, then into separate duffel bags and threw them into the Hudson River. The rest of the body was put into a large box Riggs found in the basement of their apartment. Afterwards, he and Riggs threw the box into the Hudson River.

In the weeks following Melendez's disappearance, Alig allegedly told "anyone who would listen" that he and Riggs had killed him. Most people did not believe Alig and thought his "confession" was a ploy to get attention.

=== Investigation and arrest ===
On April 23, 1996, Michael Musto reported rumors of Alig's involvement in Melendez's death via a blind item in his Village Voice column. Although no names were used, Musto's reports included the details of murder. Musto had previously reported on Alig's firing from The Limelight and noted the buzz about a missing club person. On April 27, 1996, the New York Post's "Page Six" column ran a lead item about the murder mystery, citing Musto's reporting as well as a New York magazine piece quoting an evasive Alig. Over the coming weeks, the Village Voice continued to report and make accusations about Melendez's murder.

Through September 1996, the police still had not questioned Alig about the murder; they were focused on his former boss and onetime business partner, Peter Gatien, wanting Alig to testify against him. Since several months had passed, many people believed Alig would get away with murdering Melendez, until children playing in the water pulled a box containing a legless torso from the waters of Oakwood Beach at Miller Field, in New Dorp, Staten Island. James St. James recounted how Melendez's brother was baffled by what he regarded as callous indifference by the police and by the scenesters Melendez had considered friends.

In November 1996, the coroner reported the body had been identified as Melendez. Alig fled New York, but was located by police in a motel room rented by his drug dealer boyfriend, Brian, in Toms River, New Jersey. Alig was arrested as was Riggs. Shortly after his arrest, Riggs confessed to police:

On a Sunday in March of 1996 I was at home ... and Michael Alig and Angel Melendez were loudly arguing ... and getting louder. I opened the room and started towards the other bedroom ... at which point Michael Alig was yelling, "Help me!" "Get him off of me" [Angel] started shaking him violently and banging him against the wall. He was yelling "You better get my money or I'll break your neck"... I grabbed the hammer ... and hit Angel over the head ...

According to Riggs, he hit Melendez a total of three times on the head with the hammer. Then Alig grabbed a pillow and tried to smother him. While Melendez was unconscious, Riggs went to the other room; when he returned, he noticed a broken syringe on the floor. Riggs claimed that Alig was pouring "some cleaner or chemical" into Melendez' mouth, then duct-taped it with the help of Riggs. Alig disputed these claims, however, and cited the "Drano in the hypodermic needle" as one of the key false dramatizations in Disco Bloodbath and Party Monster.

Alig claimed he killed Melendez in self-defense and helped to dispose of the body in a panic. Prosecutors were hesitant to charge Alig with first-degree murder, as they still hoped he would testify against his former boss, Peter Gatien, who had been arrested for allowing drugs to be sold in his nightclubs. They eventually offered both Alig and Riggs a plea deal: a sentence of 10 to 20 years if they accepted the lesser charge of manslaughter. On October 1, 1997, both pleaded guilty and were sentenced to 10 to 20 years.

While in prison, Alig told Musto, "I know why I blabbed. I must have wanted to stop me. I was spinning out of control. It's like the old saying 'What do you have to do to get attention around here – kill somebody?'"

== Prison ==
While incarcerated in the New York State prison system, Alig was transferred from prison to prison; he also spent time in the psychiatric ward at Rikers Island. In 2000, at Southport Correctional Facility, he was placed in solitary confinement after he was caught using heroin. He remained in solitary for another two-and-a-half years after a drug test showed that he was still using drugs.

In August 2004, James St. James began a blog entitled "Phone Calls From a Felon". The blog contained transcripts of phone conversations between Alig and St. James about Alig's experiences in prison. After six weeks, Alig put a stop to the phone calls claiming, "People think I'm having a grand old time. Or that I'm trying to exploit my situation." He was moved to Elmira Correctional Facility that year.

Alig became eligible for parole in 2006. His first parole request, in November 2006, was denied, reportedly after parole officers watched the film Party Monster (2003), a fictionalized account of Alig's life, starring Macaulay Culkin. He was again denied parole in July 2008 after failing several drug tests. In an interview with his former fellow prisoner, Daniel Genis, Alig said that his time spent reading while in solitary inspired him to write his memoirs, which he titled Aligula, and he particularly identified with the character Raskolnikov from Dostoevsky's Crime and Punishment. In a 2014 interview, Alig said that he had been sober since March 2009.

== Post-prison ==
Alig was paroled on May 5, 2014. Per the conditions of his parole, Alig returned to New York City. He was required to abide by an 8:00 p.m. curfew and undergo drug and anger management counseling, and job readiness training. In the months following his release, Alig granted numerous interviews in which he expressed a desire to star in his own reality show and stage an exhibition of his artwork.

=== Art ===
In May 2015, a selection of Alig's paintings went on display at the SELECT Fair in New York.

On June 25, 2015, Alig had his first and only art show event held in three separate art galleries in New York City in the LES area. In the New York Post article "Party Monster: Painting in Prison Kept Me from Killing Myself", it featured the upcoming June 25, 2015, art event, an interview of Michael Alig as a painter and photos his paintings such as Zombie Babies, Club Kids and the Pfizer series - Orange Butterflies Pfizer painting.

Michael Alig art event on June 25, 2015. Ingrid LaLa (left) and James St. James (center)

The art event was filmed by World of Wonder (WOW) for the Party Monster 2 movie. James St James, DJ Keoki, JennyTalia, film director Eric Spade Rivas, Hollywood musician/movie actress Ingrid LaLa, NYC musician/painter Joseph Arthur, NYC nightlife legend Steve Lewis, and many others attended Michael Alig's June 25, 2015, art event.

=== Nightlife and film career ===
DJ Keoki started to DJ at a weekly Monday night party called Outrage! in the New York City LES area. Later DJ Keoki got Alig involved with Outrage!. Michael Alig enlisted his mentor and executive manager from Hollywood, Ingrid LaLa, to create a master contact list, do PR and send MailChimp emails for the Outrage! parties. Outrage! became a success that ran the venue every Monday night with DJ Keoki doing DJ sets and Alig bringing in the old and new generation of Club Kids.

In January 2017, Alig convinced NYC nightlife personality/musician Jason Chaos to curate and work Outrage! Each week Outrage! had a party with a theme. With Jason Chaos, Alig, Ingrid LaLa and others working as a team, Outrage! became a successful party and Alig was working in nightlife promotions again.

Alig starred in four Eric Spade Rivas films : Vamp Bikers, Vamp Bikers Dos, Vamp Bikers 3 and Duke of New York.

On February 2, 2017, Alig was arrested for trespassing and smoking crystal meth in Joyce Kilmer Park in Concourse, outside the Bronx Supreme Court, at approximately 1:30 a.m. He was detained because the park closes after dusk. The complaint alleges that "police found a bag of crystal meth and a pipe with residue from the drug in his jacket pocket". The New York Daily News reported that Alig was arraigned on drug possession and trespass charges, and pleaded guilty to trespass in exchange for a conditional discharge.

After working the Outrage! events, Alig continued to promote and host parties in New York City. During the COVID-19 pandemic lockdowns, Michael Alig and Jason Chaos hosted Zoom party events. Due to the popularity of these events during the lockdown, NYC police investigated believing there was a real in person event when it was actually a virtual party. Alig hosted these virtual parties until his death.

=== Death ===
On December 24, 2020, shortly before midnight, Alig was found unconscious by his ex-boyfriend at their Washington Heights, Manhattan, home. He was using heroin before he overdosed and was pronounced dead at the scene. He was 54 years old. The following day, Christmas, Alig's mother confirmed his cause of death as an accidental heroin overdose. The Office of the Chief Medical examiner in New York City verified in May 2021 that Alig died from acute intoxication from the drugs fentanyl, acetylfentanyl, heroin and methamphetamine.

== In media ==
Books

- The events of Alig's years as a club promoter up to his arrest are covered in James St. James' memoir, Disco Bloodbath: A Fabulous but True Tale of Murder in Clubland (1999), re-published with the title Party Monster after the release of the eponymous 2003 film.

Films

- The events of Alig's years as a club promoter up to his arrest were portrayed in the documentary, produced and directed by Fenton Bailey and Randy Barbato, Party Monster: The Shockumentary (1998) and the subsequent feature film, also produced, directed, and written by Bailey and Barbato, Party Monster (2003), starring Macaulay Culkin as Alig and Seth Green as St. James, as well as the documentary film Glory Daze: The Life and Times of Michael Alig (2015) in January 2018 available on Netflix streaming.
- A prison interview with Alig is featured in the documentary Limelight (2011), directed by Billy Corben and co-produced by Peter Gatien's daughter, Jen Gatien.
- Alig is cast as "Michael" in Spanish NY based independent director Manuel Toledano's first and only movie (finished in 1998 with the participation of producer Elias Querejeta), called "Shampoo Horns" (Cuernos de Espuma, 1998). The film portrayed those years and the Club Kids fad, partly as fiction, partly as a documentary. The shooting was done during 1996, and Alig was supposed to be acting during the same period he committed his real-life crime.
- Michael Alig had several roles in four Eric Spade Rivas films : Vamp Bikers, Vamp Bikers Dos, Vamp Bikers 3 and Duke of New York.

Television

Alig's case has been featured on the TV series:

- American Justice: "Dancing, Drugs, and Murder" (April 13, 2000; season 7, episode 10), on A&E
- Deadly Devotion: "Becoming Angel" (July 16, 2013) on Investigation Discovery
- Notorious: "Dancing, Drugs and Murder" (December 27, 2005; season 2, Episode 76), on The Biography Channel
- The 1990s: The Deadliest Decade: "Death of an Angel" (November 19, 2018, season 1, episode 3), for Investigation Discovery
- E! True Hollywood Story: "Death by Disco" (November 19, 2018), for E!

Theatre

- Clubland: The Monster Pop Party (2013), a musical adaptation of St. James' book Party Monster and its 2003 eponymous film adaptation, debuted April 11, 2013, at the American Repertory Theater's Club Oberon, with book, music, and lyrics by Andrew Barret Cox

== See also ==
- LGBT culture in New York City
- List of LGBT people from New York City
