= Disco Bloodbath =

Book by James St. James

- Author: James St. James
- Language: English
- Genre: Non Fiction
- Publisher: Simon & Schuster
- Publication date: August 11, 1999
- Publication place: United States
- Media type: Print (Hardback & Paperback)
- Pages: 288
- ISBN: 0-684-85764-2
- OCLC: 40990164
- Dewey Decimal: 364.15/23/097471 21
- LC Class: HV5805.S7 A3 199

Disco Bloodbath: A Fabulous but True Tale of Murder in Clubland is a 1999 memoir written by James St. James about his life as a Manhattan celebutante and Club Kid. The book specifically chronicles his friend Michael Alig's rise to fame, and Alig and his roommate's subsequent murder of fellow club kid and drug dealer Andre "Angel" Melendez. St. James was Alig's mentor, rival, and collaborator in the Manhattan party scene and was familiar with many of its key figures. The memoir was later retitled Party Monster after the 2003 motion picture of that name starring Macaulay Culkin, Seth Green, Chloë Sevigny, and Marilyn Manson.

Disco Bloodbath has since gone out of print. It was only printed three times: in 1999, twice in paperback with different colored jackets, and once in hardcover. It was reprinted in 2003 under the title Party Monster - The Fabulous but True Tale of Murder in Clubland (ISBN 0-684-85764-2); paperbacks are widely available.

== Characters ==
=== Michael Alig ===
Michael Alig was a founder of the notorious Club Kids, a group of young clubgoers led by Alig in the late 1980s and early 1990s. In 1996, Alig and his roommate, Robert D. "Freeze" Riggs, were convicted of murdering Andre "Angel" Melendez in a confrontation over a delinquent debt.

=== DJ Keoki ===
Superstar DJ Keoki is an electronic music DJ who was born in El Salvador but raised in Hawaii. He had no experience as a DJ when he was branded "Superstar DJ Keoki". It was infamous partykid (later, murderer) Michael Alig who helped in the early promotion of his then boyfriend DJ Keoki.

=== James St. James ===
James St. James (born James Clark) was a Club Kid of the Manhattan nightclub scene in the late 1980s/early 1990s, Alig's mentor, and the author of the book. He was notorious for a lifestyle of excess that included heavy drug use, partying, and bizarre costumes. St. James continues to work with World of Wonder, the production company that produced the films Party Monster: The Shockumentary (1998) and Party Monster (2003), both based on St. James' memoirs, Disco Bloodbath: A Fabulous but True Tale of Murder in Clubland.

=== Andre Melendez ===
Andre Melendez, better known as Angel Melendez, was a Club Kid and purported drug dealer who lived and worked in New York City. Melendez and his family arrived in New York from Colombia when Melendez was 8 years old. Melendez became a drug dealer during the early 1990s after meeting Peter Gatien, owner of The Limelight and several other prominent nightclubs in New York City, and became a regular dealer in Gatien's clubs. He was frequently seen at Manhattan clubs wearing his trademark feathered wings.
