= Party Monster (film) =

- Theatrical release poster
- Directed by: Fenton Bailey; Randy Barbato
- Written by: Fenton Bailey; Randy Barbato
- Based on: Disco Bloodbath by James St. James
- Produced by: Fenton Bailey; Randy Barbato; Jon Marcus; Christine Vachon
- Starring: Macaulay Culkin; Seth Green; Chloë Sevigny; Diana Scarwid; Wilmer Valderrama; Natasha Lyonne; Wilson Cruz; Dylan McDermott; Marilyn Manson
- Cinematography: Teodoro Maniaci
- Edited by: Jeremy Simmons
- Music by: Jimmy Harry
- Production companies: Killer Films; Fortissimo Film Sales; World of Wonder
- Distributed by: Strand Releasing
- Release dates: January 18, 2003 (Sundance); September 5, 2003 (United States)
- Running time: 99 minutes
- Country: United States
- Language: English
- Budget: $5 million
- Box office: $782,606

Party Monster is a 2003 American biographical crime drama film written and directed by Fenton Bailey and Randy Barbato, and produced by Bailey and Barbato with Jon Marcus and Christine Vachon. It stars Macaulay Culkin as the drug-addled "king of the Club Kids". The film tells the story of the rise and fall of the infamous New York City party promoter Michael Alig. It was Culkin's first film in nearly nine years since his starring role in Richie Rich.

The film is based on Disco Bloodbath, the memoir of James St. James, which details his friendship with Alig and its collapse as Alig's drug addiction worsened, and its end after he murdered Andre "Angel" Melendez and went to prison. Bailey and Barbato had previously directed a 1998 documentary on the murder, also called Party Monster: The Shockumentary, from which certain elements were used for this film.

== Plot ==
The film opens with Michael Alig as a small-town outcast who lived with his mother before moving to New York. Michael learns about the New York party scene from James St. James, who teaches him the "rules of fabulousness", which revolve around attracting as much attention to oneself as possible.

Despite James' warning, Alig hosts a party at The Limelight, a local club owned by Peter Gatien. With Alig as its main attraction, the Limelight soon becomes the hottest club in New York. Alig is named "King of the Club Kids" and goes on a cross-country journey in search of more club kids. Alig and James pick up Angel Melendez, Gitsie, and Brooke. Gitsie becomes Michael's latest sidekick, although the movie implies the relationship was little more than platonic. After Michael descends further into drug abuse, his life starts to spiral out of control, eventually culminating in his involvement in the murder of Angel. Gitsie and Michael decide to go to rehab, but ultimately return to New York with the same drug problems as before. Michael loses his job and ends up in a motel in New Jersey, where he is arrested and sent to prison after being outed by James. James then begins to write his "Great American Novel", published first as Disco Bloodbath and later as Party Monster.

== Cast ==
- Macaulay Culkin as Michael Alig
  - Brendan O'Malley as young Michael Alig
- Seth Green as James Clark/James St. James
  - Dillon Woolley as young James Clark
- Chloë Sevigny as Gitsie
- Natasha Lyonne as Brooke
- Wilmer Valderrama as Superstar DJ Keoki
- Wilson Cruz as Andre "Angel" Melendez
- Diana Scarwid as Elke Alig
- Dylan McDermott as Peter Gatien
- Marilyn Manson as Christina Superstar
- Mia Kirshner as Natasha Gatien
- Justin Hagan as Robert "Freez" Riggs
- John Stamos as talk show host
- Daniel Franzese as stage hand/The Rat
- Amanda Lepore as herself (uncredited)
- Richie Rich as himself (uncredited)
- Armen Ra as himself (uncredited)

== Soundtrack ==
The soundtrack peaked at number 21 on the US Billboard Dance/Electronic Albums.

Professional ratings
Review scores
Source	Rating
AllMusic	2.5/5 stars

No.	Title	Artist	Length
1.	"Take Me to the Club"	Mannequin	3:36
2.	"Seventeen"	Ladytron	3:31
3.	"Frank Sinatra"	Miss Kittin & The Hacker	3:53
4.	"Money, Success, Fame, Glamour"	Felix da Housecat vs. Pop Tarts	3:23
5.	"You're My Disco" (Fischerspooner Remix)	Waldorf	4:26
6.	"Two of Hearts"	Stacey Q	3:36
7.	"Overdose"	Tomcraft	2:57
8.	"Get Happy"	Happy Thought Hall	3:28
9.	"La Rock 01"	Vitalic	3:05
10.	"Go!"	Tones on Tail	2:34
11.	"New York New York"	Nina Hagen	4:41
12.	"It Can't Come Quickly Enough"	Scissor Sisters	3:32
13.	"Inside Out"	W.I.T.	3:36
14.	"Kiss Me"	Stephen Tin Tin	3:26
15.	"Give Me Tonight"	Shannon	3:53
16.	"(How to Be A) Millionaire"	ABC	3:35
17.	"Crash"	Keoki	2:54
18.	"The La La Song"	Marilyn Manson	1:32
19.	"Good is Bad"	Headrillaz	2:56
20.	"Santa Baby"	Cynthia Basinet	3:23

== Release ==
Party Monster made its world premiere at the 2003 Sundance Film Festival on January 18, 2003, and later played at the Cannes Film Festival in May of that year. On September 5, 2003, the film was put on limited release to different art house theaters in major US cities.

== Reception ==
On the review aggregator website Rotten Tomatoes, 29% of 77 critics' reviews are positive, with an average rating of 4.7/10. The website's consensus reads: "The lurid display of camp soon turns tedious." Metacritic, which uses a weighted average, assigned the film a weighed average score of 36 out of 100, based on 29 critics, indicating "generally unfavorable" reviews.

It was nominated for the Grand Jury Prize at the 2003 Sundance Film Festival, however, and Chicago Sun-Times critic Roger Ebert gave the film three out of four stars, calling Culkin's performance "fearless", though he remarked that "the movie lacks insight and leaves us feeling sad and empty—sad for ourselves, not Alig—and maybe it had to be that way".

The film was only given a limited release. According to Box Office Mojo, the film only grossed $742,898 domestically (and $782,606 worldwide total) out of a budget of $5 million in its theatrical release.

== Home media ==
The film was released on DVD in the United States and Canada in February 2004 through 20th Century Fox Home Entertainment; the DVD contained various cast interviews, an audio commentary, behind-the-scenes footage, the film's original theatrical trailer, and an interview with Michael Alig as bonus materials. The DVD has been out of print since 2009 and is largely unavailable for purchase at standard retail stores, however it is available for streaming on various platforms.
