= James St. James =

American TV & internet personality and author

- James St. James (center). Ingrid LaLa (left) and Corey Rae (right) in 2015
- Born: James Clark; August 1, 1966 (age 60); Saginaw, Michigan, US
- Occupations: Party promoter; novelist; television personality
- Writing career
- Genres: True crime, fiction
- Notable work: Party Monster

James St. James (born James Clark; August 1, 1966) is a television and internet personality, author, celebutante, frequent collaborator with Mathu Andersen, and former "Club Kid", a member of the New York City club scene in the late 1980s and early 1990s.

St. James was known for a lifestyle of excess that included heavy drug use, partying, and bizarre costumes that first brought him to national attention as the subject of television appearances and interviews. He wrote Disco Bloodbath (now published under the title Party Monster) that was later made into the feature film Party Monster (2003), starring Macaulay Culkin as Michael Alig and Seth Green as St. James. His life was the subject of the documentary Party Monster: The Shockumentary (1998).

== Early life and education ==
James grew up in an affluent family in Saginaw, Michigan, where he lived with his mother after his parents divorced. In the summer, he would stay with his father and younger and older siblings in Fort Lauderdale, Florida, until he moved to Fort Lauderdale for high school.

== Career ==
In the late 1980s, St. James became friendly with Michael Alig, although at first he and the other club personalities shunned the newcomer. Undeterred, Alig soon created his own scene by gathering up other creative personalities of the nightlife world; he used his flamboyant style, and engaged in self-promotion and themed parties. St. James morphed from celebutante to Club Kid while helping Alig create the new scene. Alig and St. James threw many parties together, eventually setting up the Disco 2000 club night at the New York City club The Limelight. St. James wrote several columns, most famously for the short-lived New York City-based gay publication OutWeek during the magazine's two year life span from 1989 to 1991.

St. James appeared many times on television talk shows to discuss the Club Kids during the 1980s and 1990s, including The Oprah Winfrey Show, The Phil Donahue Show, The Jerry Springer Show, Geraldo, and The Joan Rivers Show.

== Publishing debut ==
St. James's debut book, Disco Bloodbath (1999), is a memoir that describes his life in the club scene and documents the infamous rise to fame of Michael Alig and Alig's and Freeze's killing of Andre "Angel" Melendez. The film Party Monster: The Shockumentary (1998) was released prior to but is based on events in Disco Bloodbath, as is the film Party Monster (2003).

== Freak Show and the 2000s ==
St. James published a second book, Freak Show in 2007, a comedy/romance about a teenage drag queen who attends a new school and forges a relationship with the football team's quarterback. Freak Show was named to the American Library Association Best Books for Young Adults list. The book was adapted into a feature in 2017 by Maven Entertainment. The film was directed by Trudie Styler and stars Alex Lawther, Abigail Breslin, and Bette Midler.

St. James curates art shows at the World of Wonder Gallery for the production company World of Wonder, makers of both Party Monster: The Shockumentary (1998) and Party Monster (2003), and blogs regularly on World of Wonder's website, the WOW Report.

In the 2000s, St. James has made regular appearances on America's Next Top Model, cycles 5, 7, & 11, presenting contest skill challenges to the aspiring models. St. James also appeared in season 2, episode 9 of RuPaul's Drag Race, where he interviewed the top four contestants on a red carpet before they walked the runway.

St. James had a long running webseries through the World of Wonder channel WOW Presents, titled Transformations: with James St. James. The webseries featured various makeup artists, drag queens, Club Kids, and RuPaul's Drag Race alums giving St. James themed makeovers.

St. James currently has a podcast, Night Fever, on Spotify and Apple Podcasts, which he co-hosts with Fenton Bailey and Randy Barbato. The podcast includes leading New York nightlife figures of the '70s, '80s, and '90s.

== Bibliography ==
- St. James, James (1999). Disco Bloodbath: A Fabulous But True Tale of Murder in Clubland (August 11, 1999 ed.). Simon & Schuster. p. 288. ISBN 0-684-85764-2. (Now published under the title "Party Monster") recreated as the feature film Party Monster starring Macaulay Culkin as Alig and Seth Green as St. James.
- St. James, James (2007). Freak Show (May 17, 2007 ed.). Dutton Juvenile. p. 298. ISBN 978-0-525-47799-0.

== Filmography ==
=== Film ===
Year	Title	Role	Notes	Ref.
1998	Shampoo Horns	James	Film	
1998	Party Monster: The Shockumentary	Himself	Documentary Film	
2002	Uncut: The True Story of Hair	Additional Crew	Documentary	
2003	Party Monster	Writer	Film	
2015	Glory Daze: The Life and Times of Michael Alig	Himself	Documentary Film	
2018	Freak Show	Writer	Film	

=== Television ===
Year	Title	Role	Notes	Ref.
1990	The Joan Rivers Show	Himself	"People Who Dress to Get Attention"	
2000	American Justice	Himself	Season 9, Episode 10: "Dancing, Drugs and Murder"	
2000	E! True Hollywood Story	Himself	Season 4, Episode 16: "Death by Disco"	
2003	20/20	Himself - Friend of Peter	''Party Monster/Party Monster and Murder"	
2003	The Sharon Osbourne Show	Himself		
2005	Queer Edge with Jack E. Jett	Himself	Season 2, Episode 2: "#2.2"	
2005	America's Next Top Model	Himself	Season 5, Episode 3: "The Girl Who Needs a Mircacle"	
2006	The Tyra Banks Show	Himself	''America's Next Top Transsexual Model" & "Transsexual Top Model"	
2006	America's Next Top Model	Himself	Season 7, Episode 8: "The Girl Who Wrecks the Car"	
2008	America's Next Top Model	Himself	Season 11, Episode 9: "Now You See Me, Now You Don't"	

=== Web series ===
Year	Title	Role	Notes	Ref.
2013	Transformations: with James St. James	Himself (host)	6 seasons, 189 episodes	
2016	Hey Qween!	Himself	Season 4, Episode 12: "James St. James"	
