= Notorious (2004 TV series) =

American biographical documentary television series

- Genre: Documentary
- Country of origin: United States
- Original language: English
- No. of seasons: 4
- No. of episodes: 152

Production
- Running time: 42 minutes

Original release
- Network: The Biography Channel
- Release: September 27, 2004 – December 14, 2007

Notorious is an American documentary television series that profiles the lives of infamous individuals in history. The series aired on The Biography Channel.

Most episodes of Notorious are rehashes of the similar television shows American Justice and Mobsters, both series that were originally broadcast on A&E, Biography Channel's sister channel. The only difference between the series is the introduction of the episodes and the lead-in after commercials.
