= The Limelight =

Chain of nightclubs best known for its NYC location in a former Episcopal church

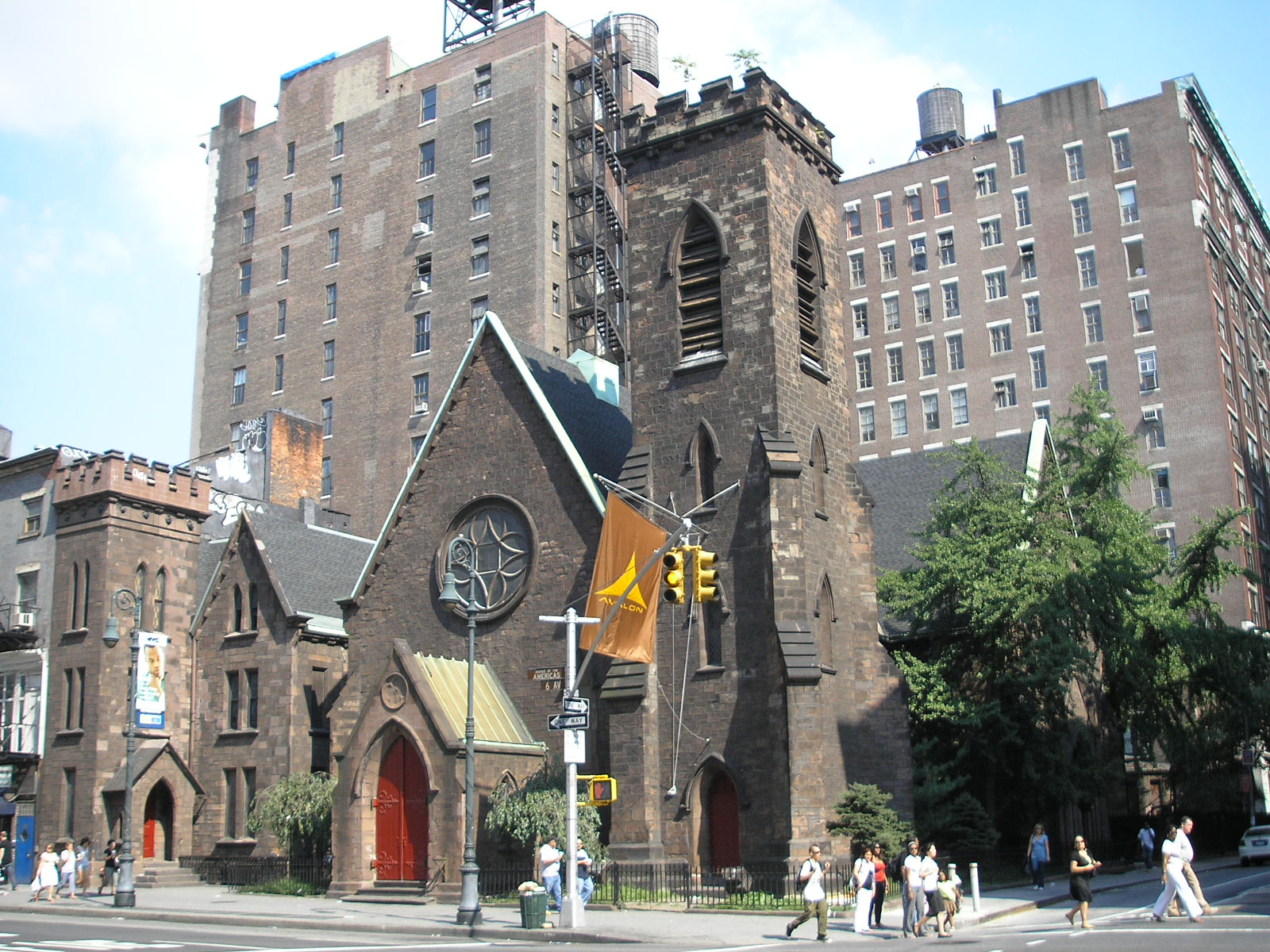
- The Limelight building in Manhattan, New York City, 2007
- Interactive map of The Limelight
- Address: New York City; Chicago; Atlanta; London; Hallandale, Florida; United States; England
- Owner: Peter Gatien
- Operator: Peter Gatien
- Type: Nightclub

Construction
- Opened: 1970s
- Closed: 2010

The Limelight was a chain of nightclubs owned and operated by Peter Gatien. It had locations in New York City, Chicago, Atlanta, London and Hallandale, Florida.

== History ==
=== Florida and Atlanta locations ===
Peter Gatien opened the first Limelight nightclub in Hallandale, Florida, in the 1970s. The club was featured in the Jerry Lewis movie Hardly Working. Following a devastating fire on the early morning of May 6, 1980, Gatien chose Atlanta for his next incarnation of the club. The Atlanta Limelight opened in February 1980. It was housed in a strip mall at the former site of the Harlequin Dinner Theater.

The Limelight in Atlanta was a high-profile Euro-style night club designed and built in partnership with Guy Larente from Montreal, Quebec who helped in the build of the Limelight series. The Limelight in Atlanta hosted many notables and celebrities over the years. A single photo taken in June 1981 skyrocketed the focus on the club, when celebrity photographer Guy D'Alema captured an image of Anita Bryant dancing the night away with evangelist Russ McGraw, known in gay communities as an activist. Several hundred newspapers and magazines ran the photo with the headline “Anita Upset Over Disco Photo”.

Peter Gatien relished the publicity. The club hosted many Interview Magazine events that brought names like Andy Warhol, Grace Jones, Debbie Harry, Duran Duran, Burt Reynolds, Ali MacGraw, and Village People's Randy Jones, among others to the club. Other celebrity sightings included Tom Cruise, Liza Minnelli, Michael Jackson, Pia Zadora, Shannon Tweed, Gene Simmons, Rick Springfield and Mamie Van Doren, to name but a few. The club also served as a location for Hal Ashby's film The Slugger's Wife (1985), which starred Rebecca De Mornay.

In 1983, when Gatien relocated to New York to open another Limelight club, his brother Maurice managed the Atlanta club. Maurice reportedly had less talent for running a nightclub than Gatien. "Peter was the brains behind the operation," according to house photographer and publicist Guy D'Alema. "Maurice ... didn't want to spend a dime and didn't have a creative bone in his body." The Atlanta club was located next to a 24-hour Kroger grocery store, which became known widely as "Disco Kroger."

In July 2010, several former Limelight employees – including Randy Easterling, Jim Redford, Noel Aguirre, and Aron Siegel – along with a few of their regular customer dancers – including Jonathan Spanier and Bret Roberts – produced "One More Night at the Limelight", a 30th Anniversary Party, at The Buckhead Theatre, formerly The Roxy Theatre. Due to the party's success and great attendance, combined with the untimely death of one of its organizers (Spanier), the remaining team produced another party, "Limelight Revisited: Déjà vu Discotheque", on August 6, 2011, at Center Stage Atlanta in midtown Atlanta.

=== Chicago location ===
The Limelight in Chicago was housed in the former home of the Chicago Historical Society; the building itself is a historic structure. It was opened in 1985, and became Excalibur nightclub in 1989. The steps to the entrance led to a hallway lined with museum cases that housed carnival like models dancing and generally moving about. There were several levels to the club. The main dance floor had a stage for the DJ. There were several private rooms that often played host to a bevy of celebrities both in music and in sports. The alternative music scene was critical at the Limelight as it played late into the 5 a.m. hour in Chicago on Saturday nights.

=== London location ===
From 1985, the Limelight in London was located in a former Welsh Presbyterian church on Shaftesbury Avenue, just off Cambridge Circus, which dates from the 1890s. The London club's decline in popularity led to the club being sold as a going concern, eventually being taken over in 2003 by Australian pub chain The Walkabout, which converted it into a sports bar. In 2013 the Walkabout eventually ceased trading and the premises is empty and awaiting conversion to a new performing arts use by the charity Stone Nest.

=== New York City location ===
==== Beginning ====
The club in New York City, situated on Sixth Avenue at West 20th Street, was the most significant and infamous of all the Limelight locations. It opened in November 1983 and was designed by Ari Bahat. The site is the former Episcopal Church of the Holy Communion. The church was a Gothic Revival brownstone building that was built in 1844-45 and designed by architect Richard Upjohn. In the early 1970s, when the parish merged with two others, the church was deconsecrated and sold to Odyssey House, a drug rehabilitation program. Amidst financial hardship, Odyssey House sold it to Gatien in 1982.

Gatien was deeply interested in art and architecture, so he thought the church would be perfect as a club. He spent close to $5 million on renovations. The ceilings stretched four stories over the main dance floor. There were five staircases from the main chamber going to numerous lounges that hosted a different crowd in each room, cloves, VIP rooms, and the chapel area where experimental parties would be thrown to test out the popularity of such events.

The New York Limelight originally started as a disco and rock club. In the 1990s, it became a prominent place to hear techno, goth, and industrial music. The club was attractive to the people of NYC because it was inclusive. Goths, drag queens, rockers, leather boys, and socialites could all be seen partying with each other in one night. There were approximately 15,000 people showing up to the Limelight per night. During this time, Gatien was named the Club King.

==== Trial ====
In October 1995, the club was raided by the New York Police Department. They were only able to make three small arrests of marijuana dealers because Gatien had been tipped off. The Limelight was temporarily locked up for a week after Gatien paid a $30,000 fine and posted a $160,000 bond. In 1996, club kid and party promoter Michael Alig was arrested and later convicted for the killing and dismemberment of Angel Melendez, a fellow member of the Club Kids and a drug dealer who frequented the club.

The Limelight was closed by the police, and reopened several times during the 1990s. In 1998, Gatien was put on trial for selling drugs within his chain of clubs. His lawyer Ben Brafman claimed that the 80-page affidavit used to arrest Gatien contained no proof that directly linked him to drug distribution at the clubs. He argued that it was "selective prosecution", due to the fact that Gatien ran such a huge operation, he could not be held individually or personally responsible for isolated pockets of drug dealing.

==== End ====
Assistant U.S. Attorney Eric Friendberg called the Limelight "a drug supermarket" where "massive amounts" of ecstasy as well as cocaine, special K, and rohypnol were used as "promotional tools to lure patrons to the club." In the end, the government agreed on not accusing Gatien of personally selling drugs or profiting from the dealers operating in his clubs. They argued that he allowed drug dealers into his venues to advertise and increase popularity, therefore pleading him not guilty.

In September 2003, it reopened under the name Avalon. It closed its doors permanently in 2010. In May 2010, the building was converted to the Limelight Marketplace, a shopping space for artisnal brands which lasted four years. In 2014, it was converted into an outlet of the David Barton Gym chain. In December 2016, this location as well as all four other David Barton Gym locations in New York City abruptly closed their doors for business. In June 2017, it reopened as Limelight Fitness. In 2015, a portion of the Limelight was taken over by Jue Lan Club, a Chinese restaurant and lounge. Over the years, Jue Lan Club venue has been accused of causing disorderly conduct. Limelight Pizza has also taken over a part of the space. However, as of 2026, the main sanctuary space is unused and for lease.

== 2011 documentary ==
In April 2011, Rakontur released Limelight at the Tribeca Film Festival. The documentary's world rights were bought by Magnolia Pictures. The documentary, which highlights the club's history during the Gatien era, was produced by Gatien's daughter, Jen, and directed by Billy Corben.

== See also ==
- Church of the Holy Communion and Buildings
- Palladium (club)
- Tunnel (New York nightclub)
- Superclub
