= Miami drug war =

Armed conflicts in the 1970s and 1980s

Miami Drug War
- Part of the war on drugs
| Date | 1979–1988 |
| Location | Miami, Florida |
| Result | Unresolved: Violence significantly reduced, cocaine still widely available |

Belligerents
| United States: DEA; FBI; Miami Police Department; BSO | Drug cartels: Medellín Cartel; Colombian/Colombian-American gangs; Blanco Drug Gang; Arcila Mejia Drug Gang; Valdes-Magluta-Falcon Drug Gang; Roberts Drug Gang; Seal Drug Gang; Munday Drug Gang; Mermelstein Drug Gang; Corporation; Marielitos street gangs; Other criminal gangs; Miami Boys; Shower Posse |

Commanders and leaders
| Jimmy Carter; Ronald Reagan; Reubin Askew; Bob Graham | Pablo Escobar; Griselda Blanco; Jorge "Rivi" Ayala; Fabio Ochoa; Mickey Munday; Barry Seal; Luis Fernando Arcila Mejia; Sal Magluta; Willy Falcon |

Casualties and losses
- 1,200+ casualties

The Miami drug war was a series of armed conflicts in the 1970s and 1980s, centered in the city of Miami, Florida, between the United States government and multiple drug cartels, primarily the Medellín Cartel. It was predominantly fueled by the illegal trafficking of cocaine.

== Background ==
By 1975, Pablo Escobar and the Medellín cartel had established cocaine trafficking routes into the US through Miami, superseding the 'Cuban mafia' which had previously controlled drug smuggling in Florida. They were smuggling 40–60 kilograms (88–132 lb) of cocaine to Miami every week via airdrops over the Everglades from small planes, earning around $8 million per month. Miami was well situated to be a hub for cocaine smuggling due to its position in the Caribbean and the widespread use of Spanish. By 1981, Miami was responsible for trafficking 70% of the US's cocaine, 70% of its marijuana, and 90% of its counterfeit Quaaludes.

Major traffickers in Miami at the time include the Falcon brothers and Sal Magluta who smuggled in around $2 billion of cocaine from Colombia, as well as Medellín cartel traffickers Rafael Cardona Salazar, Carlos Lehder, Mickey Munday, Jon Roberts, Griselda Blanco, George Jung, Barry Seal and Max Mermelstein. Much of Miami's drug trafficking activity was centered out of Coconut Grove's Mutiny at Sailboat Bay, where drug traffickers would frequently meet and conduct business.

== Violence ==
A shootout at Dadeland Mall on July 11, 1979, started the drug war, although gang-related violence had already been significant in the years beforehand. (Note: In 1977, gang-related violence accounted for 14% of all murders, rising to 20% in 1978 and 30% in 1979.) Two members of a Colombian drug gang entered a liquor store and shot two men in broad daylight. The murderers were quickly dubbed "Cocaine Cowboys" by a police officer. Due to ensuing turf wars between drug lords, Miami soon became known as the "Drug Capital of the World".

Most of the violent crime in Miami during the period was directly related to conflicts in the city's growing drug trade. In 1979, there were 349 murders in Miami. The next year, the city had 573 murders and the year after that, it had 621 murders. By 1981, the city morgue had an overload of dead bodies and was forced to rent a refrigerated truck in which to keep them, using it until 1988. Crime in Miami had become so rampant that journalist Roben Farzad argues that the city was a failed state. Dade County had 425 murders in 1984 (23.7 per 100,000 residents) making it the "murder capital" of the US.

Griselda Blanco was reportedly responsible for most of the murders in South Florida between 1979 and 1981. She was suspected to be behind at least 40 murders, but possibly connected to as many as 200. Jorge "Rivi" Ayala, one of Blanco's hitmen, pled guilty to three murders in 1993 but is believed to be responsible for around three dozen killings during the drug wars.

== Police corruption ==
Police corruption was a problem in Miami during the period. This was fueled by a "virtual hiring frenzy" in the Miami Police Department in 1981 and 1982 when 714 officers were hired, more than doubling the force's size by relaxing screening standards. At one point in 1987, 100 of Miami's 1,060 police officers had been or were under investigation on corruption-related matters.

=== River Cops ===
The Miami River Cops Scandal was an incident where a group of 19 police officers were convicted of various state and federal crimes including murder, racketeering, robbery, drug possession, civil rights violations and conspiracy charges. Upon conviction, the officers were given prison sentences averaging 23 years.

Beginning in 1984, the police officers started to seize and steal cash and drugs from motorists stopped for traffic violations. The officers then started to target more and more sizeable seizures by getting tip-offs from informants. On July 13, 1985, the officers seized hundreds of kilograms of cocaine in secret compartments of the Mitzi Ann, a boat docked at the Tamiami Marina. In July 1985, the officers raided another shipment of drugs, this time on the Mary C, a pleasure boat at the Jones Boat Yard on the Miami River, taking 350–400 kilograms (770–880 lb) of cocaine worth around $10 million at the time. During the raid, three of the seven person crew unloading the cocaine drowned attempting to escape.

Some of the seized cocaine was kept for personal use but most was sold. The corruption was uncovered during the investigation into the deaths at the Jones Boat Yard and when officers were apprehended attempting to sell the cocaine to undercover agents. The first trial of the River Cops started in September 1986 with seven officers as defendants but resulted in a mistrial after jurors could not agree on a verdict. Twenty officers, including the seven from the first trial, were indicted as part of a new trial. After one of the defendants became a prosecution witness, ten officers pled guilty and two were convicted at trial in February 1988.

== Law enforcement response ==
In December 1980, the Drug Enforcement Administration (DEA) launched Operation Swordfish, a major investigation into international drug organizations in Miami. The operation centered around a fake money laundering front in Miami Lakes called Dean International Investments and led to indictments of 67 people on federal charges, the seizure of 100 kilograms (220 lb) of cocaine, 250,000 methaqualone pills, tons of marijuana and $800,000 in cash and assets.

In February 1982, Ronald Reagan declared that "epidemic drug smuggling" had helped to create a "serious problem" in South Florida. He set up a Florida task force with agents from the DEA, US Customs, the FBI, the ATF and the US Department of Justice which began work in March 1982. The increased manpower and coordination given to combat cocaine smuggling in Miami resulted in the amount seized nearly doubling by 1983 to an average of 2,000 pounds (910 kg) a week. Even with more seizures, cocaine supply in Miami increased as smugglers saw it as an overhead cost; a member of Dade County's Organized Crime Bureau quipped that "we could have every customs inspector in the country here and I could still get some cocaine in" due to small size of cocaine packages and the ease with which they could be hidden.

== Legacy ==
According to a 2017 Orlando Sentinel article, although Colombian criminal organizations remain active in South Florida, they are smaller, less violent and more decentralized than during the Miami drug wars. The dominance of Mexican cartels in the US cocaine trade in the 21st century means that more smuggling occurs across the southern border, with an estimated 93% of cocaine entering the US from Mexico by 2010. Nonetheless, Florida remains an important trafficking hub, notably for Dominican traffickers smuggling cocaine via Puerto Rico. In 2019, the DEA reported that Florida was the US state with the largest amount of cocaine seized by weight, above California, Pennsylvania, and Puerto Rico.

As cocaine became cheaper in Miami and the US, dealers started to look for more profitable smuggling avenues, such as into Europe. The situation in some European cities in the 2020s has been compared to the Miami drug wars. In 2021, the DEA's deputy chief in Europe said that Antwerp had become a "drug economy" and was "a repeat of Miami in the 1980s".

== See also ==
- Blackfriars Massacre
