= Organized crime in Miami =

Organized crime in Miami encompasses the actions of several organized crime groups operating in Miami, Florida, and the Miami metropolitan area. Italian-American Mafia criminal organizations in the city are nicknamed the Miami Mafia. Starting in the 20th century, Italian-American Mafia bosses agreed to share South Florida as a territory open to all Italian-American Mafia crime families, with the exception of the pornography racket, over which the Gambino family held a monopoly.

Criminal organizations known to operate in Miami include:

- Trafficante crime family, the only Italian-American Mafia crime family originating in Florida, though mainly operating in the Tampa Bay area
- Various Italian-American Mafia families that originate outside of Florida but operate in Miami, including:
  - Bonanno crime family
  - Colombo crime family
  - Gambino crime family
  - Genovese crime family
  - Lucchese crime family
  - Philadelphia crime family
  - Chicago Outfit
  - New Orleans crime family
- Sicilian Mafia
- Camorra
- 'Ndrangheta
- The Corporation (Cuban mafia)
- Dixie Mafia
- Israeli mafia
- Jewish mob
- Russian mafia
- Medellín Cartel
  - Griselda Blanco drug gang
  - Luis Fernando Arcila Mejia drug gang
  - Jorge Valdes–Sal Magluta–Willy Falcon drug gang
  - Jon Roberts cocaine smuggling and distribution net ( linked to Gambino crime family)
  - Mickey Munday drug smuggling net
  - Max Mermelstein drug smuggling net
  - Barry Seal drug smuggling net
- Cali Cartel
- Martinez Familia Sangeros
