= Jorge Ayala =

Colombian-American gangster (born 1957)

Jorge "Rivi" Ayala
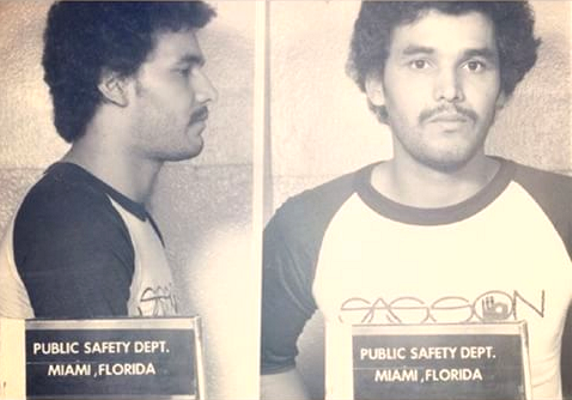
- Mugshot of Rivi, 1985
- Born: 6 September 1964 (age 61); Santiago de Cali, Valle del Cauca, Colombia
- Other names: Riverita; Ed Vasquez; Ed Ramirez; Carlos Mendez; Jorge Aldarez; Jorge Cuesta; George Cuesta
- Occupation: Contract killer
- Criminal status: Incarcerated as of 2026.

Jorge Ayala-Rivera, also known as "Rivi" is a Colombian criminal who is best known for his work as a hitman for Griselda Blanco. In 1993, Ayala was sentenced to life in prison with the possibility of parole after 25 years.

== Background ==
Jorge Ayala was born in Cali, Colombia but grew up in Chicago. In addition to his mother tongue of Spanish he also became fluent in English, which he spoke at a native level. Ayala was born with a distinctive high-pitched voice.

While living in Chicago, Ayala started off as a car mechanic for his father at General Motors, but eventually strayed into criminality and started stealing cars for chop shops across the city. He generated additional income by facilitating the entry of Mexican undocumented immigrants into the United States.

In 1979, a job that required him to transport used guns by truck first took Ayala from Chicago to Miami, after which he decided to stay in the Miami area. Here Ayala took on a job as an enforcer, "shaking down" individuals who owed money.

== Working for Blanco ==
Ayala was considered to be Griselda Blanco's top enforcer. He led a small crew which helped him carry out various crimes. Rivi's brother, Alonso Ayala, also worked as a sicario for Blanco.

== Killings ==
Ayala pled guilty to three killings in 1993, but was believed to be responsible for roughly three dozen murders that took place during the Miami drug war.

=== Johnny Castro ===
In 1982, Griselda Blanco ordered Ayala to kill Jesus “Chucho” Castro, one of her former enforcers. According to George Cadavid, a Miami police homicide detective, she wanted Castro dead after he had been hired to protect a drug supplier, but refused to carry out an unspecified order. However, Ayala claims that Blanco wanted Castro dead for an offense against one of her sons.

The attempt on Castro's life occurred on February 6 of that year. Ayala and Miguelito Perez drove up alongside Castro's vehicle while he was stopped at a red light and executed a drive-by shooting with a silenced machine gun.

However, the bullets missed Castro and accidentally killed his two-year-old son, Johnny, who they were unaware was in the car with his father. Ayala was charged with the murder of Castro's son in August 1988.

=== Alfredo and Grizel Lorenzo ===
Acting on orders of Griselda Blanco, Ayala and his crew killed drug-dealing married couple Alfredo and Grizel Lorenzo in their South Miami home on May 26, 1982. Their killings were the apparent result of a cocaine shipment which the couple had received from Blanco, but failed to pay her for. According to Ayala, Griselda Blanco had originally ordered the murder of everyone in the house, but he made sure that the kids of Alfredo and Grizel Lorenzo were not harmed.

== Additional murders ==
- Jorge Ayala is said to have killed 11 members of Luis Mejia's gang in New York City during the summer of 1981 as well as Mejia's father, Octavio Mejia, in Miami that same year.
- Ayala once told state prosecutors that in 1981 he accepted a $50,000 payment for killing a man for Blanco while her then-3-year-old son, Michael, was in the room.

== Law enforcement apprehension ==
Jorge Ayala was arrested in connection with a Chicago bank robbery. It was during this time that authorities were also searching for Griselda Blanco's top hitman, whom they only knew by the name of "Riverita". Soon after his capture, they realized that he was the assassin they had been looking for.

== Trial and sentencing ==
Ayala made an agreement with the Florida district attorney's office to testify against Griselda Blanco, who had been charged with three counts of first-degree murder, but the case fell apart and was ultimately dismissed due to Ayala being involved in a phone sex scandal with two secretaries that worked in the state's attorney's office. Ayala pleaded guilty in 1993 to three murders and was sentenced to life in prison with the possibility of parole after 25 years. If released, Ayala will be deported to Colombia.

== In popular culture ==
A character based on Ayala, renamed to "Rudy", was briefly featured in Cocaine Godmother, a 2017 TV film loosely based on the life of Griselda Blanco. Martin Rodriguez plays Jorge 'Rivi' Ayala in the 2024 Netflix limited series titled Griselda.
