= Sofía Vergara =

Colombian and American actress (born 1972)

Sofia Vergara
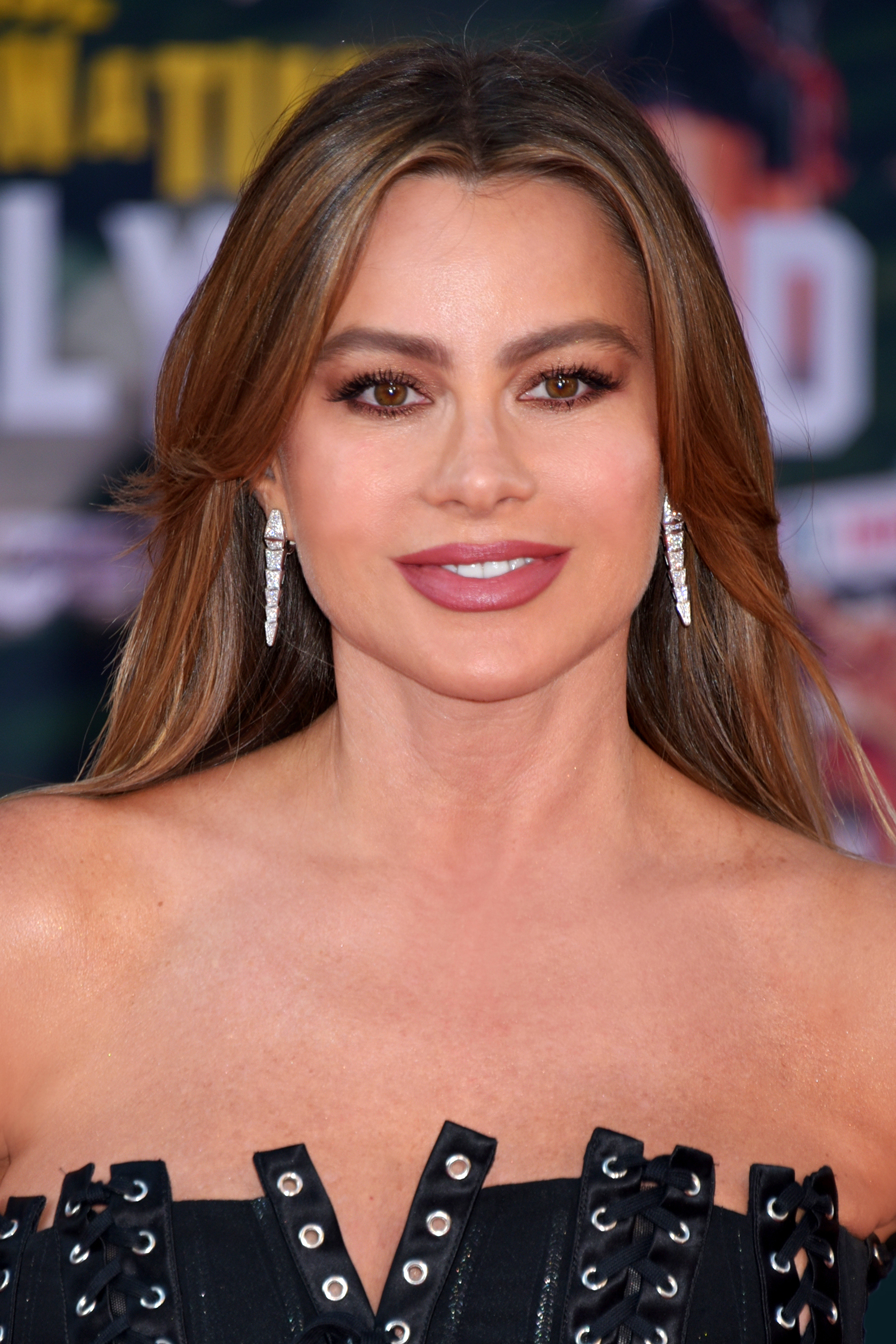
- Vergara in 2019
- Born: Sofía Margarita Vergara Vergara; July 10, 1972 (age 54); Barranquilla, Atlántico, Colombia
- Citizenship: Colombia (by birthplace); United States (naturalized)
- Occupations: Actress; television personality; businesswoman
- Years active: 1995–present
- Spouses: Joe Gonzalez (m. 1990; div. 1993); Joe Manganiello (m. 2015; div. 2024)
- Children: 1
- Relatives: Sandra Vergara (cousin, adopted sister); Paulina Dávila (second cousin)
- Website: www.sofiavergara.com

Sofía Margarita Vergara Vergara (Spanish: [soˈfi.a βeɾˈɣaɾa]; born July 10, 1972) is a Colombian and American actress and television personality. She has received five nominations each at the Primetime Emmy Awards and the Golden Globe Awards. She is one of the highest-paid actresses in the United States.

Vergara is known for her role as Gloria Delgado-Pritchett in the ABC sitcom Modern Family (2009–2020) and Griselda Blanco in the Netflix miniseries Griselda (2024). She rose to prominence when co-hosting two television shows for the Spanish-language television network Univision in the late 1990s. After acting in the English-language film Chasing Papi (2003), she subsequently appeared in Four Brothers (2005), and Tyler Perry's comedies Meet the Browns (2008) and Madea Goes to Jail (2009). Vergara also acted in New Year's Eve (2011), The Three Stooges (2012), Machete Kills (2013), Fading Gigolo (2013), Chef (2014), and Hot Pursuit (2015). She has also had voice-over roles in the animated films Happy Feet Two (2011), The Emoji Movie (2017), and Despicable Me 4 (2024).

Since 2020, Vergara has been a judge on the television talent show America's Got Talent. She is also known as a businesswoman and a brand ambassador. Vergara designs her own fashion line for Walmart, and signed with both Pepsi and CoverGirl in 2011. She launched her first fragrance "Sofia by Sofia Vergara" in 2014, and has since released four more fragrances.

== Early life ==
Sofía Margarita Vergara was born on July 10, 1972, to a Catholic family in Barranquilla, Atlántico, Colombia. Her mother, Margarita Vergara de Vergara, was a homemaker, and her father, Julio Enrique Vergara Robayo, was a cattle rancher for the meat industry. She was nicknamed "Toti" by her five siblings and many cousins. Vergara has Spanish and Italian origins.

Vergara initially studied dentistry for three years at National University of Colombia, but she left two semesters away from completing her degree to pursue opportunities in modeling and show business. In 1998, her older brother Rafael was murdered in Colombia during an attempt to kidnap him. Not wanting to be caught in the unrest that resulted from the murder, Vergara emigrated to the United States, settling in Miami, Florida. Her cousin and adopted sister, Sandra, is also a television actress in the United States.

== Career ==
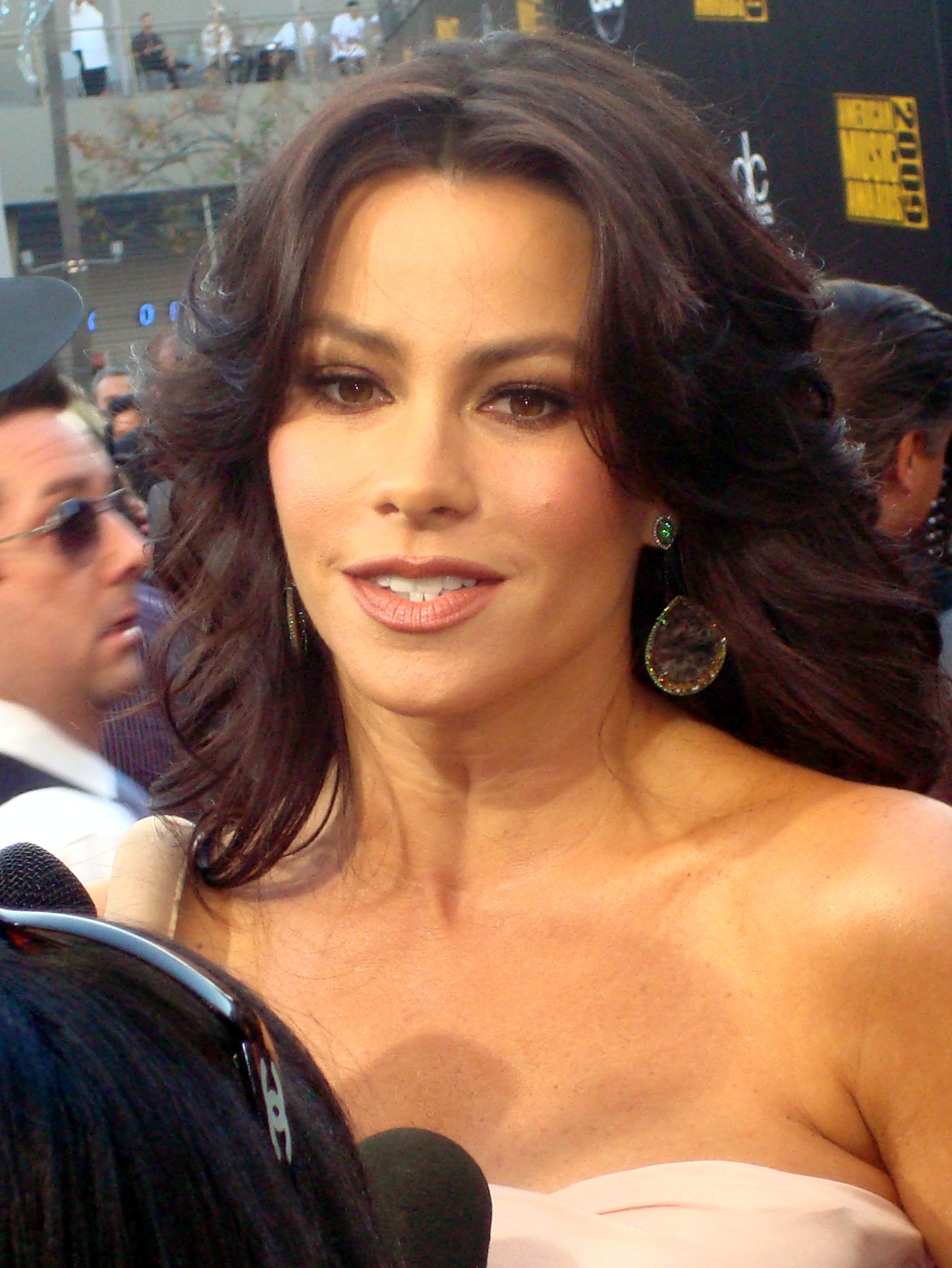
Vergara in 2009

=== 1989 to 2008: Early modeling career ===
Vergara was discovered by a photographer while walking on a beach in Santa Marta, Colombia, and she was quickly presented with offers of modeling and television work. She was "apprehensive about doing her first television commercial—until her Catholic schoolteachers gave her their personal permission to take the assignment." She made her first appearance, age 17, in a Pepsi commercial aired in Latin America. She then began studies at the Creative Workshops School of Acting, where Gloria Estefan also trained.

In 1992, she won the Look of the Year contest in Colombia, and competed at International Finals in New York, And although she didn't win, this opened doors for her in the modeling world in New York, Miami, and London, and later she was hired by Univision, the largest Latin television network based in Miami, first as a model for various variety shows like Sabado Gigante, Lente Loco, Fuera de Serie, and El Blablazo, and then as a celebrity correspondent in Primer Impacto and El Gordo y La Flaca before launching her acting career.

=== 2009 to 2019: Modern Family and rise to prominence ===
In 2009, Vergara appeared in Chicago on Broadway as Matron Mama Morton for six weeks.

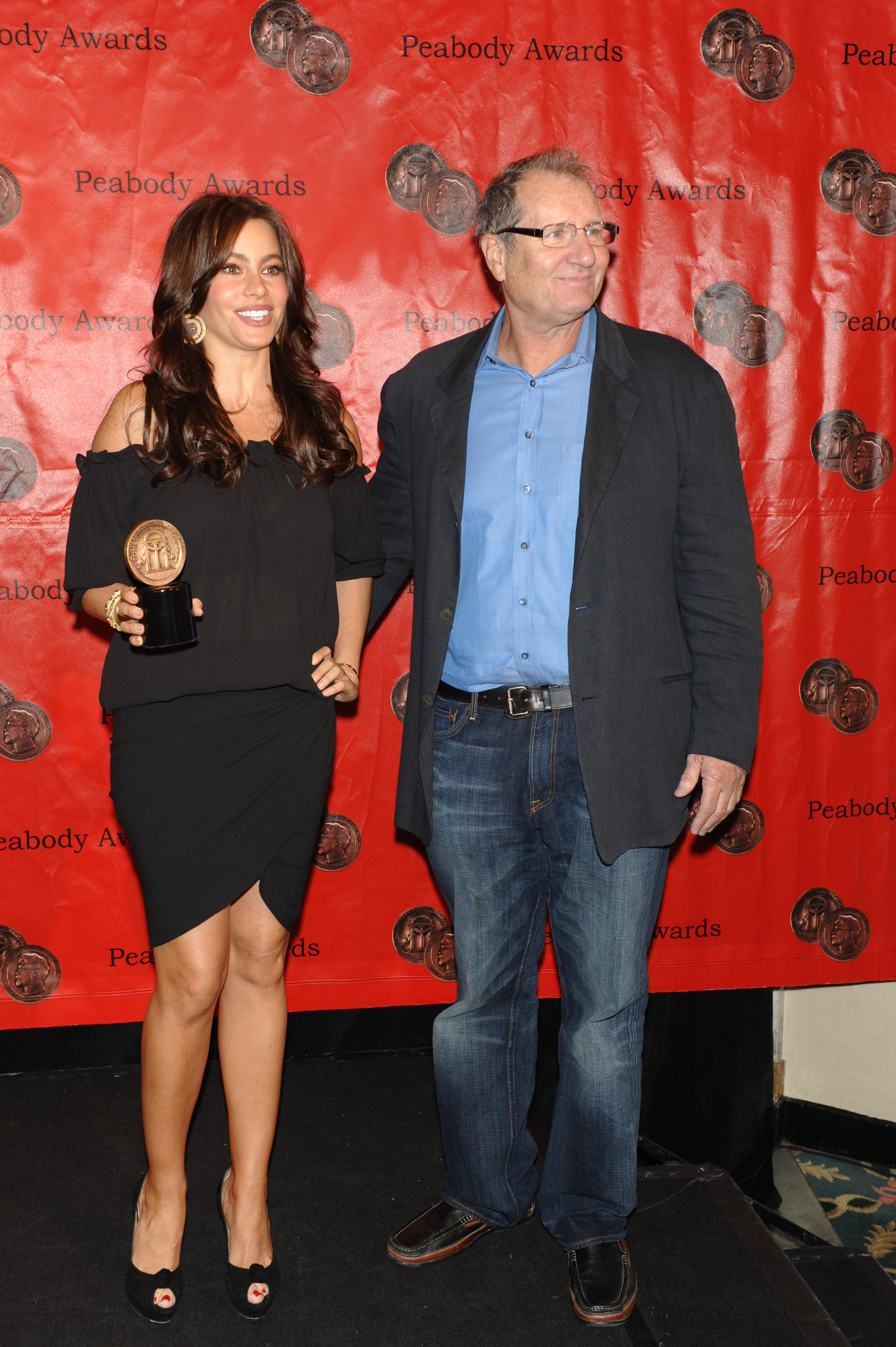
Vergara with costar Ed O'Neill in 2010

That same year she got a starring role on the ABC sitcom Modern Family as Gloria Delgado-Pritchett, for which she was nominated for the Primetime Emmy Award for Outstanding Supporting Actress in a Comedy Series from 2010 to 2013. Vergara was the highest-earning woman in U.S. television, earning $19 million for the previous 12 months, according to a list released by Forbes.com on July 18, 2012. Vergara was named one of People magazine's "50 most beautiful people", and named by The Hollywood Reporter and Billboard as one of the most influential Latin women in Hollywood. Vergara received a star on the Hollywood Walk of Fame on May 7, 2015. In 2015, Forbes estimated Vergara's annual income at $28.5 million.

She was scheduled to star in The Paperboy, an independent drama directed by Lee Daniels. However shooting was delayed and the revised resumption conflicted with her shooting schedule for the third season of Modern Family and she dropped out. In July 2011, she finished filming the Farrelly Brothers' The Three Stooges, her first leading role in a major film. She said, "I play a mean woman that tries to manipulate the Three Stooges into killing her husband so that she gets all the money." In April 2012, she appeared in her son Manolo's YouTube web series Vida con Toty.

=== 2020 to present: Later success ===
In February 2020, Vergara was announced as a new judge on America's Got Talent, beginning for its fifteenth season. She has since appeared on the program for six consecutive seasons. In two out of her six seasons as a judge, Vergara's "golden buzzer" selections have won the show (Mayyas in 2022 and Jessica Sanchez in 2025).

In 2024, Vergara earned a historic nomination for Outstanding Lead Actress in a Limited or Anthology Series or Movie at the Primetime Emmy Awards for her portrayal of Griselda Blanco in the Netflix miniseries Griselda. This nomination made her the first Latina born in a Latin American country to be nominated in this category. Despite her acclaimed performance, Vergara did not win the Emmy, losing to Jodie Foster. She humorously acknowledged the loss, joking that she was "robbed" for the fifth time. Vergara's portrayal of Blanco was deeply personal, influenced by the 1996 murder of her older brother, Rafael, by a Colombian cartel. This tragedy profoundly impacted her family and motivated her to take on the role, despite the challenges it presented.

In 2026, Vergara, alongside Owen Wilson, was featured in a commercial that aired during Super Bowl LX to promote Telemundo's coverage of the 2026 FIFA World Cup.

== Business ventures ==
In 2011, it was announced that Vergara has designed a Kmart clothing line aimed at soccer moms. In 2011, Vergara was named the face of CoverGirl, with the first advertisements appearing in January 2012. In April 2011, she appeared in a Diet Pepsi commercial with David Beckham and another in January 2012. Also in 2011, she appeared in a number of commercials for Comcast's Xfinity brand and State Farm. In 2013, she signed endorsement contracts with Diet Pepsi, Rooms To Go, and the medicine Synthroid. Vergara launched a furniture line with Rooms To Go in 2013. She wanted to create well-made and affordable furniture, saying: "Everyone should be able to make their home look amazing and be proud of their home." In 2014, Vergara became a brand ambassador for the American anti-dandruff shampoo brand Head & Shoulders.

In March 2017, she reached a settlement with Venus Concept for alleged improper use of her likeness, which Vergara said created the false impression that she endorsed their beauty products. She launched her first fragrance "Sofia by Sofia Vergara" in 2014 and has since released four more fragrances. In June 2023, Vergara launched the beauty brand Toty, after her childhood nickname. In 2024, Vergara launched Dios Mio! Coffee, a brand devoted to elevating female Colombian growers.

List of product lines by Sofia Vergara
Year	Title	Brand	Notes
2005	"EBY by Sofia Vergara"	EBY (Empowered By You)	Clothing collection
2011–2015	"Sofia by Sofia Vergara"	Kmart	Clothing collection
2013–present	"Sofia Vergara Furniture Collection"	Rooms To Go	Furniture line
2018	"Sofia by Sofia Vergara" (Latin America Exclusive)	Payless	Shoe and bag collection
2019–present	"Sofía Jeans by Sofía Vergara"	Walmart	Clothing collection
2020–present	"Sofia Vergara x Foster Grant"	Foster Grant	Eyewear collection
2021	"Sofia Intimates by Sofia Vergara"	Walmart	Intimate apparel line
2022	"Sofia Jewelry by Sofia Vergara"	Walmart	Jewelry line
2022	"Sofía Home by Sofía Vergara"	Walmart	Home decoration line
2023	"Toty"		Vergara's own beauty brand

== Personal life ==
Vergara has naturally blonde hair. For movies and television, she is sometimes asked to color her hair dark brown or black to make her look more stereotypically Hispanic.

Vergara is a longtime supporter of St. Jude Children's Research Hospital.

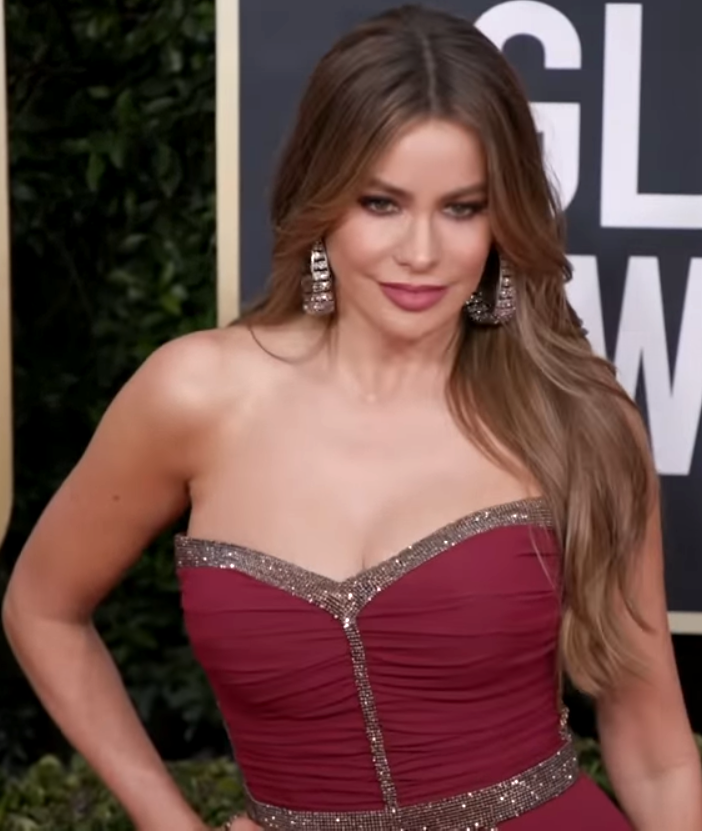
Vergara on the red carpet at the 77th Golden Globe Awards in January 2020

Vergara was married at the age of 18 in 1990 to her high-school sweetheart, Joe Gonzalez. They have a son named Manolo, who was born in Colombia on September 16, 1991. They divorced in 1993. Vergara and her boyfriend Nick Loeb became engaged in 2012 after dating for two years. On May 23, 2014, Vergara announced that the engagement had been called off. Vergara and actor Joe Manganiello became engaged on Christmas Eve 2014 after dating for six months. They married in Palm Beach, Florida, on November 21, 2015. On July 17, 2023, Vergara and Manganiello announced to Page Six that they have separated and are planning to divorce after seven years of marriage. The divorce was finalized in February 2024. In 2023, she began dating orthopedic surgeon Justin Saliman.

Vergara was diagnosed with thyroid cancer in 2000 at the age of 28. She had her thyroid removed, underwent radioiodine therapy, and made a full recovery. She takes medication to prevent hypothyroidism. On May 9, 2011, Vergara's younger brother Julio was deported from the United States to Colombia after being arrested in April that year; Julio also had a longtime drug addiction and previous brushes with the law. Vergara told Parade magazine, "To see somebody dying over 10 years, little by little, that's the worst punishment. Now he's like another person." During her December 2014 appearance on Jimmy Kimmel Live!, Vergara revealed that she had become a United States citizen after getting a perfect score on her citizenship test.

From 2015 to 2017, Vergara was involved in a legal dispute regarding the future of two fertilized embryos produced by in vitro fertilization while she was still in a relationship with Loeb; the embryos were kept in storage in cryopreservation in a medical clinic in California. Following the couple's split in 2014, Loeb filed a lawsuit for custody of the embryos in a California court, but he later dropped that lawsuit when the court demanded that Loeb identify two women who had abortions after he had impregnated them. Loeb had written "Keeping them frozen forever is tantamount to killing them," in a 2015 op-ed in The New York Times. In December 2016, a right-to-life lawsuit against Vergara was initiated in Louisiana with Vergara's embryos as plaintiffs.

The embryos were named "Emma" and "Isabella" in the lawsuit, and their "trustee" was listed as James Charbonnet, a New Orleans resident of no relation to Vergara. The intent of the suit was to give the embryos a chance to further develop using a surrogate carrier, hence to be born, and to benefit from an inheritance trust that had been created for them and is administered by Charbonnet. The suit also tried to terminate parental rights of Vergara because by keeping them in cryopreservation in a medical clinic she allegedly abandoned and neglected the embryos. The legal case was novel and took advantage of Louisiana's embryo laws; the state passed a law in 1986 that declares embryos to be "juridical persons", giving embryos the right to sue or be sued. In August 2017, a Louisiana judge dismissed the case on the grounds that the court had no jurisdiction over the embryos, which were conceived in California.

== Acting credits ==
=== Film ===
Year	Title	Role	Notes
2002	Collateral Damage	Airplane Hijacker	Deleted scene
2002	Big Trouble	Nina	
2003	Chasing Papi	Cici	
2004	The 24th Day	Isabella	
2004	Soul Plane	Blanca	
2005	Lords of Dogtown	Amelia	
2005	Four Brothers	Sofi	
2005	7 días	Pepe Cobo's fan	
2006	Grilled	Loridonna	
2006	National Lampoon's Pledge This!	Herself	
2008	Tyler Perry's Meet the Browns	Cheryl	
2009	Madea Goes to Jail	T.T.	
2011	The Smurfs	Odile Anjelou	
2011	New Year's Eve	Ava	
2011	Happy Feet Two	Carmen	Voice role
2012	The Three Stooges	Lydia Harter	
2013	Escape from Planet Earth	Gabby Babblebrook	Voice role
2013	Fading Gigolo	Selima	
2013	Machete Kills	Madame Desdemona	
2014	Chef	Inez	
2015	Wild Card	D.D.	
2015	Hot Pursuit	Daniella Riva	Also executive producer
2017	The Female Brain	Lisa	
2017	The Emoji Movie	Flamenco Dancer	Voice role
2018	Bent	Rebecca	
2018	The Con Is On	Vivien	
2019	Bottom of the 9th	Angela Ramirez	
2021	Koati	Zaina	Voice role; also executive producer
2023	Strays	Dolores The Couch	Voice role
2024	This Is Me... Now: A Love Story	Cancer	
2024	Despicable Me 4	Valentina	Voice role
TBA	Thumb †	TBA	Post-production

=== Television ===
Year	Title	Role	Notes
1991	Muchachitas	Herself	1 episode
1994	Festival de Viña del Mar	Herself (co-host)	Television special
1995	Festival de Viña del Mar	Herself (co-host)	Television special
1995–1996	Acapulco, cuerpo y alma	Irasema	Telenovela
1995–1998	Fuera de serie	Herself (host)	Travel show
1999	Baywatch	Herself	Episode: "Boys will be Boys"
1999–2000	A que no te atreves	Herself (host)	Variety show
2000–2001	Club La Bomba	Herself (host)	Variety show
2002	My Wife and Kids	Selma	Episode: "Samba Story"
2002	MTV Video Music Awards Latinoamérica 2002	Herself (host)	Television special
2002–2003	¡Vivan los niños!	María Clara	Guest
2004	Eve	April Perez	Episode: "Party All the Time"
2004	Rodney	Carmen	Episode: "Dream Lover"
2005	Hot Properties	Lola Hernandez	Main role, 13 episodes
2005	Punk'd	Herself	Season 5, episode 4
2007	Entourage	Village Girl	Episode: "Welcome to the Jungle"
2007	The Knights of Prosperity	Esperanza Villalobos	Main role, 13 episodes
2007	Dirty Sexy Money	Sofía Montoya	4 episodes
2007–2008	Amas de Casa Desesperadas	Alicia Oviedo	Main role, 23 episodes
2008	Fuego en la sangre	Leonora Castañeda	10 episodes
2008	Men in Trees	Pilar Romero	2 episodes
2009	Dancing with the Stars	Herself	Guest appearance
2009–2020	Modern Family	Gloria Delgado-Pritchett	Main role, 250 episodes
2011	Sesame Street	Herself	Guest appearance
2011–2013	The Cleveland Show	Señora Chalupa / Herself (voice)	2 episodes
2012	Saturday Night Live	Herself / Host	Episode: "Sofia Vergara/One Direction"
2013–2017	Family Guy	Hispanic Woman; Flower Saleswoman; Herself (voice)	Episodes: "The Giggity Wife" / "Emmy Winning Episode"
2014	Killer Women	—N/a	Executive producer
2016	The Simpsons	Carol Berrera (voice)	Episode: "Teenage Mutant Milk-Caused Hurdles"
2020	A Modern Farewell	Herself	Modern Family documentary
2020–present	America's Got Talent	Herself (judge)	Season 15–present
2023	Germany's Next Topmodel	Herself (guest judge)	Episode: "Surprise!"
2024	Griselda	Griselda Blanco	Lead role, also executive producer
2025	Koati: Animated Series	Zaina (voice)	

=== Theatre ===
Year	Title	Artist	Location
2009	Chicago	Matron "Mama" Morton (replacement)	Ambassador Theatre, Broadway

=== Music video ===
Year	Title	Artist
1997	"Que Diera"	Carlos Vives
2013	"Aura"	Lady Gaga
2020	"Yo Visto Así"	Bad Bunny

== Awards and nominations ==
Organizations	Year	Category	Work	Result	Ref.
ALMA Awards	2009	Actress in Film	Madea Goes to Jail	Nominated	
ALMA Awards	2011	Favorite TV Actress – Leading Role in a Comedy	Modern Family	Nominated	
ALMA Awards	2012	Favorite TV Actress – Leading Role in a Comedy	Modern Family	Nominated	
ALMA Awards	2012	Favorite Movie Actress – Supporting Role	The Three Stooges	Nominated	
Black Reel Awards	2006	Outstanding Ensemble (shared with the cast)	Four Brothers	Nominated	
Critics' Choice Television Awards	2011	Best Supporting Actress in a Comedy Series	Modern Family	Nominated	
Glamour Awards	2012	Comedy Actress of the Year	—N/a	Won	
Golden Globe Awards	2010	Best Supporting Actress – Television	Modern Family	Nominated	
Golden Globe Awards	2011	Best Supporting Actress – Television	Modern Family	Nominated	
Golden Globe Awards	2012	Best Supporting Actress – Television	Modern Family	Nominated	
Golden Globe Awards	2013	Best Supporting Actress – Television	Modern Family	Nominated	
Golden Globe Awards	2024	Best Actress – Miniseries or Television Film	Griselda	Nominated	
Imagen Foundation Awards	2010	Best Actress – Television	Modern Family	Nominated	
Imagen Foundation Awards	2015	Best Actress – Television	Modern Family	Nominated	
Kids' Choice Awards	2012	Favorite Movie Actress	The Smurfs	Nominated	
Kids' Choice Awards	2014	Favorite Funny Star	Modern Family	Nominated	
Kids' Choice Awards	2016	Favorite Family TV Actress	Modern Family	Won	
NAACP Image Awards	2011	Outstanding Supporting Actress in a Comedy Series	Modern Family	Won	
NAACP Image Awards	2012	Outstanding Supporting Actress in a Comedy Series	Modern Family	Nominated	
NAACP Image Awards	2014	Outstanding Supporting Actress in a Comedy Series	Modern Family	Nominated	
NAACP Image Awards	2015	Outstanding Supporting Actress in a Comedy Series	Modern Family	Nominated	
People's Choice Awards	2013	Favorite Comedic TV Actress	Modern Family	Nominated	
People's Choice Awards	2015	Favorite Comedic TV Actress	Modern Family	Nominated	
People's Choice Awards	2016	Favorite Comedic TV Actress	Modern Family	Nominated	
People's Choice Awards	2016	Favorite Comedic Movie Actress	Hot Pursuit	Nominated	
People's Choice Awards	2017	Favorite Comedic TV Actress	Modern Family	Won	
People's Choice Awards	2018	Favorite Comedy TV Star	Modern Family	Nominated	
People's Choice Awards	2020	Favorite Female TV Star	Modern Family	Nominated	
People's Choice Awards	2020	Favorite Comedy TV Star	Modern Family	Won	
Premios Juventud	2016	Actriz Que Se Roba La Pantalla	Modern Family	Nominated	
Primetime Emmy Awards	2010	Outstanding Supporting Actress in a Comedy Series	Modern Family (episode: "Not in My House")	Nominated	
Primetime Emmy Awards	2011	Outstanding Supporting Actress in a Comedy Series	Modern Family (episode: "Slow Down Your Neighbors)	Nominated	
Primetime Emmy Awards	2012	Outstanding Supporting Actress in a Comedy Series	Modern Family (episode: "Tableau Vivant")	Nominated	
Primetime Emmy Awards	2013	Outstanding Supporting Actress in a Comedy Series	Modern Family (episode: "Yard Sale")	Nominated	
Primetime Emmy Awards	2024	Outstanding Lead Actress in a Limited Series or Movie	Griselda	Nominated	
Screen Actors Guild Awards	2009	Outstanding Ensemble in a Comedy Series	Modern Family (season 1)	Nominated	
Screen Actors Guild Awards	2010	Outstanding Ensemble in a Comedy Series	Modern Family (season 2)	Won	
Screen Actors Guild Awards	2010	Outstanding Female Actor in a Comedy Series	Modern Family (season 2)	Nominated	
Screen Actors Guild Awards	2011	Outstanding Female Actor in a Comedy Series	Modern Family (season 3)	Nominated	
Screen Actors Guild Awards	2011	Outstanding Ensemble in a Comedy Series	Modern Family (season 3)	Won	
Screen Actors Guild Awards	2012	Outstanding Female Actor in a Comedy Series	Modern Family (season 4)	Nominated	
Screen Actors Guild Awards	2012	Outstanding Ensemble in a Comedy Series	Modern Family (season 4)	Won	
Screen Actors Guild Awards	2013	Outstanding Ensemble in a Comedy Series	Modern Family (season 5)	Won	
Screen Actors Guild Awards	2014	Outstanding Ensemble in a Comedy Series	Modern Family (season 6)	Nominated	
Screen Actors Guild Awards	2015	Outstanding Ensemble in a Comedy Series	Modern Family (season 7)	Nominated	
Screen Actors Guild Awards	2016	Outstanding Ensemble in a Comedy Series	Modern Family (season 8)	Nominated	
