= Roger Reaves =

American drug smuggler

William Roger Reaves
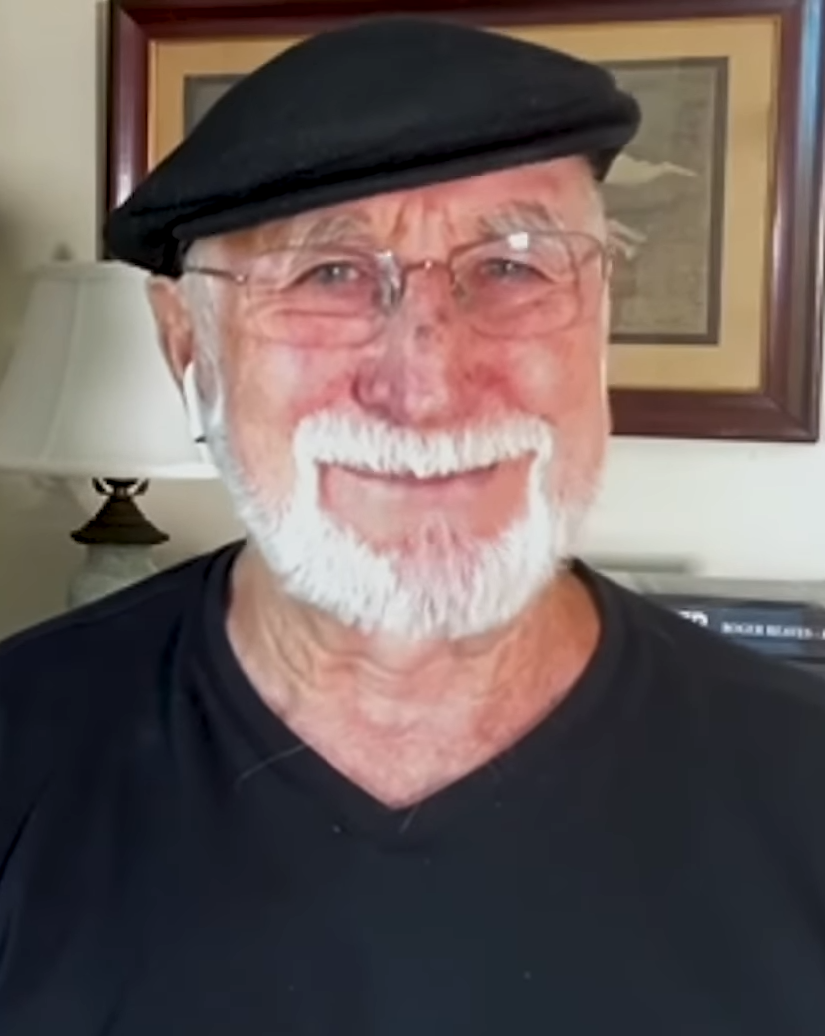
- Reaves in 2022
- Born: 1943 (age 82–83); Telfair County, Georgia
- Occupation: Pilot
- Organization: Medellín Cartel
- Known for: Drug trafficking
- Notable work: Smuggler (book)
- Criminal penalty: Imprisonment
- Criminal status: Released
- Spouse: Marrie J. Reaves

William Roger Reaves (born 1943) is an American pilot who alleges that he was one of the most prolific drug smugglers in history. He worked for Pablo Escobar and the Medellín Cartel. Reaves first met Barry Seal on a flight returning from Honduras after Seal's release from prison, according to Kings of Cocaine. Reaves is credited with discovering Seal and employing him as a pilot in drug-smuggling operations approximately two years before Seal began working directly with the Medellín Cartel.

In his memoir, Smuggler (2016), Reaves claims that Seal paid millions in bribes to the Clintons when Bill Clinton was governor of Arkansas in order to land planes carrying cocaine at Mena, Arkansas.

Reaves was referenced in more DEA case files than Manuel Noriega, according to former DEA agent Michael Levine in his book The Big White Lie. Levine described an operation in which Reaves was considered a high-value target, and agents extended the mission in hopes of capturing him.

Reaves served over thirty cumulative years in prison and escaped five times. He spent time in German, Australian, and American penal institutions, while supported by his wife throughout. He was shot down twice while in an aircraft and was tortured in a Mexican jail. In his own words, he is an "adventurous person".

== Book ==
- Smuggler (2016) ISBN 978-0692630532
