= Evan Wright =

American writer (1964–2024)

- Wright in 2008
- Born: December 12, 1964; Cleveland, Ohio, U.S.
- Died: July 12, 2024 (aged 59); Los Angeles, California, U.S.
- Education: Vassar College
- Occupation: Writer
- Notable work: Generation Kill, Hella Nation, American Desperado
- Television: Generation Kill
- Spouse: Shana "Kelli" Wright
- Children: 3
- Awards: Two National Magazine Awards

Evan Alan Wright (December 12, 1964 – July 12, 2024) was an American writer, known for his reporting on subcultures for Rolling Stone and Vanity Fair. He was best known for his book on the Iraq War, Generation Kill (2004). He also wrote an exposé about a top Central Intelligence Agency officer (Ric Prado) who allegedly worked as a Mafia hitman, How to Get Away with Murder in America (2012).

Although some compare his writings to those of Hunter S. Thompson, Wright claimed his biggest literary influences were authors Mark Twain and Christopher Isherwood. The New York Times called his military writing "nuanced and grounded in details often overlooked in daily journalistic accounts" and noted his use of "gallows humor".

== Biography ==
Wright was born in Cleveland, Ohio, on December 12, 1964, and grew up in Willoughby, Ohio. Both of his parents were lawyers and he had a sister, Nora. His father was a prosecutor, then the general counsel for a utility. Wright attended Hawken School, but was expelled for selling cannabis and sent to a home for juvenile delinquents called The Seed. He returned to Hawken and made state debate finals in high school. Wright studied at Johns Hopkins University and at Vassar College; he graduated from Vassar with a degree in medieval history. His first writing job was to interview South African political leader Mangosuthu Buthelezi, but it was for a small magazine that did not pay. Wright was married to Shana "Kelli" Wright and they had two sons, Carter and Evan Jr. and a daughter, Kennedy.

Wright committed suicide with a firearm at his home in Los Angeles on July 12, 2024, at the age of 59, reportedly due to post-traumatic stress disorder resulting from childhood abuse.

== Hustler magazine ==
In 1995, Wright became the entertainment editor and chief pornographic film reviewer for Hustler magazine. In 2000, he wrote about the experience and the issues surrounding the pornography industry in an article for Salon, titled "Maxed Out", and for the LA Weekly, in a cover story titled "Scenes from My Life in Porn".

== Immersion journalism ==
Starting in 1996 at Hustler, then at Rolling Stone, Time, and Vanity Fair, Wright wrote long features based on his immersion in subcultures ranging from radical environmentalists to neo-Nazis. Many of his essays focused on crimes or controversial figures, and were said by him to capture a "dark, untamed America" that resembled "the Wild West". Several of his essays were collected in the book Hella Nation, which Wright called a "sort of autobiography". His essays in Hella Nation were compared to Joan Didion's writings on California. Another reviewer called Hella Nation a "comically macabre portrait of American life".

== Military reporting ==
In 2002, Wright went to Afghanistan on assignment for Rolling Stone.

In 2003, he was embedded with the 1st Reconnaissance Battalion of the United States Marine Corps during the early stages of the 2003 invasion of Iraq. Wright spent his entire time embedded in a recon team led by then-Sergeant Brad Colbert. He was under fire with the Marines for several weeks, and accompanied them "on point" (i.e., in the lead vehicle). One of the Marines in the unit told The New York Times, "He was in the worst possible place to have a reporter. During the first firefight, he took 10 rounds in his door." Wright expressed admiration for the Marines, but warned them that a reporter's motto is "charm and betray." He published a series of articles for Rolling Stone magazine titled "The Killer Elite" which, in 2004, received the National Magazine Award for Reporting, the top prize in magazine writing. He then wrote Generation Kill.

In 2007, he returned to Iraq when the surge in U.S. forces was beginning. Wright interviewed General David Petraeus and spent several weeks embedded with U.S. troops in Baghdad, Ramadi, and Diwania. He later criticized American television media for promoting misperceptions of the war. He also criticized some U.S. political leaders, including Senate Majority Leader Harry Reid, for calling the surge a failure before it had been fully implemented.

== Television and film ==
HBO adapted Generation Kill into an eponymous television miniseries first aired in 2008; Wright is portrayed by Lee Tergesen. Wright himself served as a writer and consulting producer on the project, collaborating closely with Emmy-winning producer David Simon.

Wright was hired by Paramount to write a script about Miami's "Cocaine Cowboys" Jon Roberts and Mickey Munday for Peter Berg to direct. The screenplay was based on a book Wright wrote about Roberts, published by Crown Books. Actor Mark Wahlberg was producing the film with plans to star in it, but the film did not make it out of preproduction.

In 2010, it was announced that director Ole Bornedal was filming a movie inspired by an article Wright wrote for Time magazine called "Death of a Hostess". Wright's article was a profile of Japanese serial-rapist and killer Joji Obara he wrote in Tokyo for Time magazine.

In 2012, he released the book American Desperado, co-written with Jon Roberts, who was featured in the documentary Cocaine Cowboys. In 2024, he appeared in the documentary Teen Torture, Inc, during which he discussed his time at The Seed, an early troubled teen industry program.

== Controversies ==
At least six of the Marines Wright wrote about in Generation Kill have claimed they were punished for the remarks he published. Spokesman Lieutenant Nathan Braden denied that any Marines were punished as a result of Wright's work.

In 2004, Wright wrote an op-ed in The New York Times criticizing the U.S. military for allowing insurgents in Iraq to obtain weapons.

Wright criticized college creative writing programs, saying such programs produce bad writers.

== Published works ==
- "Mad Dogs & Lawyers", for Rolling Stone, republished in The Best American Crime Writing: 2003 Edition: The Year's Best True Crime Reporting
- "The Killer Elite", for Rolling Stone, republished in The Best American Magazine Writing: 2004 (Best Reporting)
- Generation Kill (2004)
- Hella Nation (2009)
- American Desperado (with Jon Roberts) (2011)
- The Best American Magazine Writing: 2008 (Best Profile Writing)
- How to Get Away with Murder in America (2012)

== Awards ==
- 2004: Los Angeles Times Book Prize for Generation Kill: Devil Dogs, Iceman, Captain America and the New Face of American War
- 2004: National Magazine Award for Reporting, the top prize in magazine writing
- 2005: J. Anthony Lukas Book Prize from the Columbia University School of Journalism and the Nieman Foundation
- 2005: PEN USA Literary Award in research nonfiction for Generation Kill: Devil Dogs, Iceman, Captain America and the New Face of American War
- 2005: General Wallace M. Greene, Jr., Award from the U.S. Marine Corps Heritage Society for writing the Best History of the Marine Corps
- 2008: National Magazine Award for Profile Writing for his Vanity Fair profile titled "Pat Dollard's War on Hollywood"
