= Max Mermelstein =

American drug smuggler turned informant

Max Mermelstein (November 1, 1942 – September 12, 2008) was an American drug smuggler for the Medellín Cartel in the late 1970s and early 80s, who later became a key informant against the organization. In the words of James P. Walsh, the U.S. Attorney for Los Angeles CA, Mermelstein "was probably the single most valuable government witness in drug matters that this country has ever known." He became a "weapon for the government". He is reputed to have smuggled 56 tons of cocaine worth $12.5 billion into the United States.

== Early life ==
Mermelstein grew up in Brooklyn. He trained as a mechanical engineer at the New York Institute of Technology. He was also an armorer in the National Guard and knew how to handle explosives after having taken several demolition courses. He met and married his first wife, a Puerto Rican woman named Gladys, in New York City. He was an air conditioner and heating equipment salesman until the 1970s when he moved to San Juan, Puerto Rico with his wife, where he worked as chief engineer for the Sheraton Hotel. Mermelstein and his wife separated soon after, as she returned to her ailing mother, but not before Mermelstein learned some "street Spanish".

While working for the Sheraton Mermelstein met a Colombian woman - Cristina Jaramillo -- and the two were soon married. After accepting a job at the Princess Hotel in Freeport in the Bahamas, Mermelstein began his first limited criminal activity by creating an "underground pipeline" to help smuggle his wife's Colombian relatives and childhood friends into the United States.

== Working for the Medellín cartel ==
One of those "friends" he helped to smuggle into the US was Rafael "Rafa" Cardona Salazar, -- "a five-foot three sociopath" -- who had a taste for basuco cigarettes which is an amalgamation of tobacco and cocaine byproducts stuffed back into cigarette shells. After Mermelstein returned to Miami with his family to work as chief engineer of the Aventura Country Club, he was awakened by a drug-fueled Cardona on Christmas morning 1978. Cardona insisted that Mermelstein drive him and his roommate back home after a cocaine-filled afterparty. Mermelstein agreed, and on the trip, Cardona and the roommate argued after Cardona accused the roommate of stealing. In a rage, Cardona shot the roommate to death at close range. Fearing for his own life, Mermelstein continued to drive until they stopped to dispose of the body at a road shoulder. They then returned to Cardona's apartment where Cardona told Mermelstein, "You work for me now."

In 1979, still fearing for his life and the lives of his family, Mermelstein started working full-time for Cardona, who had become the cartel point man in the United States. Working mainly for Jorge Luis Ochoa through Cardona, Mermelstein not only became intimate with the operations of the dominant drug smuggling network at the time called the Medellín Cartel, but vastly improved it. He was responsible for managing the logistics of drug shipments to the United States which included arranging flights, locating drop points, and scheduling deliveries.

Mermelstein traveled extensively to Colombia where he engaged all the leaders of Medellín Cartel including Pablo Escobar, Jorge Luis Ochoa, Gonzalo Rodriguez Gacha and Carlos Lehder. He spent most of his time with Cardona and the Ochoas. Together they worked on transportation routes and developed new packaging technique allowing cocaine to be dropped into the ocean in waterproof packaging.

In the late 1970s, the Colombian drug trade was still in its infancy but after just a few flights, Mermelstein was a multi-millionaire. Within six years, he turned a multimillion-dollar-a-year mom-and-pop cocaine industry into a multibillion-dollar-a-year trade.

Because of his unparalleled success, Mermelstein was present at high-council Medellín Cartel meetings and was the only American ever allowed to sit with the cartel leaders. Other honors bestowed on Mermelstein included a Medellín invitation to the baptism of Cardona's youngest son, which was attended by all the cartel leaders.

=== Participation in Barry Seal's contract murder ===
After fellow drug trafficker Barry Seal agreed to testify against Jorge Ochoa, the reputed leader of the Medellín cartel, Seal was "marked for death." Wanting an American to supervise the job, the other members of the cartel turned to Mermelstein, the one American they all trusted. It was during this time that Mermelstein was offered $1 million to kidnap Seal and $500,000 to kill him. Mermelstein—‌who spent just two years and 21 days in jail and received a $250,000 bonus for cooperating with the government on one drug case—‌acknowledged on the stand that he helped plan the contract murder of Seal in Louisiana.

Mermelstein stalled on the assassination attempt as long as possible, but pressure from both sides became too great. Federal prosecutors say it was the investigation into automaker John DeLorean's alleged cocaine-dealing activities—‌charges on which he was ultimately acquitted—‌that led them to Mermelstein. As a result of the DeLorean sting and investigation, an American pilot who flew for the cartel in California turned informant and led law enforcement agents directly to Mermelstein.

=== Mermelstein's arrest ===
In 1985 Mermelstein was arrested while driving near his home in Davie, Florida. In addition to $20,000 in his glove compartment and a .22-caliber Walther, the federal government confiscated $1.2 million in cash and property owned by Mermelstein at the time of his arrest. Fred Friedman -- a former assistant U.S. attorney who prosecuted Mermelstein in Los Angeles -- said "When they arrested him, he was driving his Jaguar, and it was like something out of Miami Vice. The agents surrounded him, and they said it seemed like he had known that he was being surveiled the previous week, and it almost appeared to them like there was a sigh of relief, like he knew it had to happen."

=== Turning informant ===
Later, at Mermelstein's home, law enforcement authorities found an assortment of weapons and $250,000 in cash under his bed. Authorities collected a good deal of incriminating evidence from another drug trafficking informant in California regarding Mermelstein's activities. With the cartel refusing to provide his million-dollar bail, coupled with facing a long prison sentence, Mermelstein decided to turn informant and make a deal with the US Customs Service—‌the predecessor to Homeland Security Investigations.

== Witness protection program participation & testimony ==
=== Unprecedented family relocation deal ===
Gerald Shur, founder of the Witness Protection Program (WITSEC), agreed to an unprecedented thirty-family-member relocation, making it the highest single relocation cost for one witness in the history of the WITSEC. Out of an approved thirty members, sixteen elected to enter. This was the first time the government agreed to protect an entire family group to maintain a witness.

Mermelstein lived under the alias Wes Barclay and worked as chief engineer for the Westgate Vacation Villas in Kissimmee, Florida.

=== Mermelstein's court testimony ===
Mermelstein began providing testimony in the indictments of Carlos Lehder, Rafael Cardona Salazar, Pablo Escobar, Jorge Luis Ochoa, and also testified against the three Colombians charged with the murder of Barry Seal.

Mermelstein testified at the trials of former kingpin Carlos Lehder and deposed former Panamanian leader Manuel Noriega, among other witness duties while in WITSEC from 1987 until his death in 2008. His testimony, among others, led to Lehder's imprisonment.

Mermelstein's testimony helped bring down the Medellín Cartel's distributors in Miami. In 1985, after he turned informant, a three million dollar contract was placed on his head, which remained until his death in 2008. Mermelstein provided testimony to grand juries in New Orleans, Miami and Los Angeles.

As a direct result of Mermelstein's testimony, indictments were returned against Fabio Ochoa Vasquez, head of the Ochoa family's operations in Medellín; Pablo Escobar Gaviria, infamous Colombian drug lord and narcoterrorist who headed the Gaviria drug family, and Rafael Cardona Salazar, the elusive drug kingpin who headed the cartel's operations in the United States. Together, the Medellín cartel families are believed to have grossed an estimated $7 billion a year in the United States.

=== A great witness ===
"Mermelstein is unbelievable as a witness," said Al Winters, a New Orleans federal prosecutor. "I don't know how to express it in any way other than to say I've been doing this for a long time, and he's as good a witness, both in recall and quality of information, as I've ever run into. His connections within the Medellin cartel are the highest." Mermelstein was able to take ledgers written in shorthand [that was] unique to the cartel and translate the confusing scrawl into evidence of cocaine sales approaching 2,957 kilos, worth $56 million, said Richard Gregorie, chief assistant U.S. attorney in Miami.

"The real drug war is run through informants, and top-level ones are treated like kings, at least before they testify. Max Mermelstein, the most important witness against the Medellin cartel, drove his handlers nuts with his imperious demands, but he was treated with kid gloves because he was so important to the government. They housed him in a secure location called "the submarine" that had no windows and was situated under a U.S. District Courthouse. When I interviewed Mermelstein in 1987, he demanded that I buy him a speakerphone and a Mont Blanc pen. I bought him the speakerphone." (Jeff Leen, Investigative Journalist)

Justice Department officials said Mermelstein provided narcotics investigators with some of the best intelligence data on the cartel and its methods. Mermelstein testified at the trial of Manuel Antonio Noriega that the U.S. government has paid him $255,900 in rewards and spent another $414,345 on living expenses for him and his family in exchange for information about former associates in the drug business.

=== Prison sentence reduced ===
In an unexpected move, U.S. District Judge James M. Ideman ordered Mermelstein released after the two years he served in prison since his arrest, declaring that he was sending "a message to Medellin, Colombia." The judge stated "I'd like to see the country get the best mileage it can out of Mr. Mermelstein." Walsh, who argued for a 10-year sentence, was originally incensed. "At the time, I thought it was unduly generous," he said last week, a few days after the sentencing. "I've had time in the last few days to think about it, and I think the judge made the right move."

=== Senate judiciary hearing ===
While still in WITSEC, Mermelstein was questioned during a closed session, by then-chairman Senator Joseph Biden at the Senate Judiciary Hearing on the Control of Foreign Drug Trafficking Activities, on 17 August 1989. The hearing was called as William J. Bennett, the Administration's director of drug control policy, was finishing a comprehensive strategy for the nation to fight illicit drugs. The strategy was later announced by President Bush the following month in a televised address.

An unprecedented security measure was taken to protect the mystery guest, as the hearing room was cleared of the public, press and committee staff. After federal marshals seated the witness and placed a screen so that only Senator Biden could see him, others were readmitted to the room. With a three-million dollar contract on his life, Mermelstein was flanked by several deputy marshals and spoke through an electronic voice modulator.

=== A witness of unprecedented value ===
Just as Pablo Escobar went to extreme measures to kill Mermelstein, the U.S. Government went to extreme measures to protect him. So much so that Gerald Shur, creator of the Federal Witness Protection Program, went into hiding in his own program after the FBI arrested a German assassin who confessed he was contracted by Escobar to kidnap Shur's wife in exchange for Mermelstein's whereabouts. Gerald Shur and his wife, Miriam, were forced into hiding for a year and a half until Escobar's death.

=== Mermelstein's descriptions of the drug business trade ===
"At the time, it seemed like a harmless vice, as far as we were concerned. And the demand in the United States was so great that we just couldn't get it up fast enough. It wound up being the fashionable drug in the early '80s. Lawyers' offices, judges' chambers, movie stars--you name it. In the upper echelon, cocaine was the way to go."

"The money was rolling in so fast and became such a problem because of its volume and bulk that just to make things go faster, we used to weigh it--you know, quick estimate. We'd separate everything in its own denominations. And one bill, U.S. currency, is approximately a gram. So we'd just package it up, weigh it, get a quick estimate of what we had and when we had time later we'd count it."

"The FBI won't tell the DEA, the DEA won't tell the FBI and nobody wants to talk to Customs. Everyone has his own budget priorities."

== Popular culture ==
The news program 60 Minutes tried to feature Mermelstein's story five times but the federal witness protection program would not permit it, as Mermelstein's case was too high-profile at the time.

Jeff Leen, co-author to the Pulitzer prize-winning book Kings of Cocaine, devoted an entire chapter to Mermelstein and is the only professional reporter to ever interview him. Leen is a six-time Pulitzer winner, former Miami Herald Chief Investigative Journalist and current assistant managing editor in charge of The Washington Post's investigations unit.

Associate Jon Roberts' self-proclaimed tale was chronicled in the documentary Cocaine Cowboys (2006), an indie hit that spawned a 2008 sequel. He appears in archive footage in the reloaded version of this documentary near the end.

In 2009, an HBO series and a film by Paramount Pictures — starring Mark Wahlberg, according to Variety — were reportedly in the works.

Documentary producer Alfred Spellman of Cocaine Cowboys states on his website rakontur.com, "Jeff Leen's book Kings of Cocaine led me to Max's book, The Man Who Made it Snow, which in turn led us to Jon Roberts and Mickey Munday. We had tried to feature Max for Cocaine Cowboys. I had found out that he was living in Sarasota, Florida. Sgt. Al Singleton of the Miami Dade Police Department arranged for us to speak on the phone twice in late 2003. Max had just testified against Fabio Ochoa in federal court in Miami earlier that year and didn't seem eager to talk to me, so eventually I gave up."

In 2011, Roberts (with co-author Evan Wright) and Munday separately published memoirs about their "Cocaine Cowboys" exploits (American Desperado and Tall Tales, respectively), which mention Mermelstein. Jon Roberts states, "Rafa Cardona Salazar was "like a lieutenant and controlled almost every kilo of coke that came into this country from Medellín. One day I came, he had this American guy there and he introduces the American and says, 'This is my compadre. You know I'm not in town a lot, but whatever it is you need, he'll take care of it. Don't worry about it. Max was a trusted person. In the beginning, it was 75 to 100 kilos a week. When you bring somebody a million dollars a week, a bond grows between people. The government had no idea, and honest to God, if it wasn't for Max Mermelstein... They knew nothing.'

He was interviewed in a disguise in documentaries by PBS Frontline about the Cocaine Cartel associate George Jung, and about Pablo Escobar.

He was portrayed by actor David Piggott in the Netflix limited series Griselda.

== Death ==
Mermelstein died September 12, 2008, aged 65, in Lexington, Kentucky, from cancer of the liver, lung, and bone. Since turning informant he lived under an assumed name within the United States Federal Witness Protection Program. His brief obituary was published in the Frankfort State Journal under his assumed name and an altered age: "Services for Wesley Barclay, 64, will be held at a later date in Florida. He died on September 12. There will be no visitation."

His eulogy was given by screenwriter Brett Tabor, who met Mermelstein four weeks earlier. Tabor later bought Mermelstein's life story and wrote a screenplay titled Cocaine Cowboys.

== See also ==
- Video of a US Senate Judiciary Committee hearing in which Mermelstein testifies before Joe Biden. Mermelstein is hidden but his voice is clearly audible.
- Cocaine Cowboys
