= Doug Miro =

American screenwriter

- Born: January 20, 1972 (age 54); United States
- Occupations: Screenwriter, producer
- Notable work: Narcos

Doug Miro (born January 20, 1972) is an American screenwriter based in Los Angeles. Miro studied screenwriting at the USC School of Cinematic Arts and graduated with a degree in English from Stanford University.

== Life and career ==
Miro's screenplays include Prince of Persia: The Sands of Time, and the Sorcerer's Apprentice, both which were written with his longtime collaborator, Carlo Bernard.

Their credits also include The Uninvited for DreamWorks and producers Walter Parkes and Laurie MacDonald, and The Great Raid for Miramax. While he was intended to work on National Treasure 3, it did not come to happen.

Miro and Bernard first made their mark with Motor City, an adaptation of the novel Edsel, (Loren Estleman) a film noir set in 1950s Detroit. The team also adapted Dean King's Skeletons of the Zahara: A True Story of Survival, which chronicles the wreck of a Connecticut merchant ship and the crew's subsequent adventures in the Sahara Desert in 1815. After reading their adaptation, Steven Spielberg and Kathleen Kennedy hired the writing team to work on the script for the 2011 Tintin film.

Miro is a creator and executive producer of the Netflix series Narcos and Narcos: Mexico.

Miro is the co-creator and co-writer (along with Ingrid Escajeda) of the Netflix series Griselda.

== Filmography ==
- (2005) The Great Raid
- (2009) The Uninvited
- (2010) Prince of Persia: The Sands of Time
- (2010) The Sorcerer's Apprentice
- (2015 - 2017) Narcos
- (2016) The Great Wall : co-written screenplay with Carlo Bernard and Tony Gilroy
- (2018 - 2021) Narcos: Mexico
- (2024) Griselda (miniseries)
