= Griselda (miniseries) =

American television series

- Promotional poster
- Genre: Biopic; True crime drama
- Created by: Doug Miro; Eric Newman; Carlo Bernard; Ingrid Escajeda
- Directed by: Andrés Baiz
- Starring: Sofía Vergara
- Music by: Carlos Rafael Rivera
- Country of origin: United States
- Original languages: English; Spanish
- No. of episodes: 6

Production
- Producers: Eric Newman; Sofía Vergara; Andrés Baiz; Luis Balaguer; Carlo Bernard; Ingrid Escajeda; Doug Miro
- Production companies: Latin World Entertainment; Willfully Obtuse; Grand Electric

Original release
- Network: Netflix
- Release: January 25, 2024

Related
- Narcos; Narcos: Mexico

Griselda is an American biographical crime drama television miniseries directed by Andrés Baiz and produced by Eric Newman and Sofía Vergara. It is written by Doug Miro and Ingrid Escajeda. It stars Vergara as Griselda Blanco, a notorious Colombian drug lord. The miniseries premiered on Netflix on January 25, 2024.

The miniseries received generally positive reviews from critics, with praise for Vergara's performance. In the first week after its release, it debuted at number one in 90 countries and topped Netflix's Global Weekly Top 10 TV (English).

== Plot ==
The story follows Griselda Blanco, a prominent crime boss, and her rise in the Miami drug scene and pursuit of power and wealth. Drug use, paranoia, and betrayal lead to her downfall, with her actions resulting in multiple deaths, including that of a child. To escape retaliation from the cartel, Griselda turns herself in to the police but faces unexpected consequences. Despite serving time in prison, tragedy strikes when most of her children are murdered. The series ends with Griselda imagining a peaceful beach scene with her children. The show serves as a cautionary tale about the destructive pursuit of power. Griselda was assassinated in 2012 in Medellín, Colombia.

== Cast and characters ==
=== Main ===
- Sofía Vergara as Griselda Blanco, a prominent Colombian drug lord in the cocaine-based drug trade and underworld of Miami, Florida, in the 1980s, also known as the "Godmother of Cocaine"
- Alberto Guerra as Darío Sepúlveda, Griselda's third husband.
- Martin Rodriguez as Jorge Ayala, Griselda's top hitman.
- Juliana Aidén Martinez as June Hawkins, a Spanish-speaking intelligence agent
- Vanessa Ferlito as Carmen Gutiérrez, Griselda's friend who provides her a place to stay in Miami.
- Christian Tappan as Arturo Mesa, Griselda's friend

=== Recurring ===
- José Zúñiga as Amilcar, a prominent drug lord in Miami.
- José Velázquez as Uber, Griselda's second son.
- Orlando Pineda as Dixon, Griselda's oldest son.
- Martín Fajardo as Ozzy, Griselda's third son.
- Fredy Yate as Chucho Castro, a worker at a diner in Miami, hired by Griselda as her bodyguard.
- Camilo Jiménez Varón as Rafa Salazar
- Diego Trujillo as German Panesso
- Maximiliano Hernández as Papo Mejía, Griselda's rival Colombian trafficker.
- Michael Reilly Burke as Captain Sweetwater
- Carolina Giraldo as Carla, a Medellín sex worker, and Griselda's friend and confidante who helps her smuggle product into the U.S.
- Paulina Dávila as Isabel, Griselda's close friend from Medellín.
- Alejandro Barrios as Horatio, Papo's bodyguard.
- Gabriel Sloyer as Raúl Díaz, Hawkins' partner.
- Julieth Restrepo as Marta Ochoa, cousin of the Ochoa brothers (who are both high-ranking members of the Medellín cartel).

=== Guest ===
- Alberto Ammann as Alberto Bravo, Griselda's second husband, who introduced her to the cocaine business.
- Ernesto Alterio as Fernando, Alberto's brother.
- Wilmer Calderon as Johnny
- Alberto Mateo as Eddie "The Bird" Rancón
- Kayla Eva as Frida
- Julian Obradors as Eric
- Taylor Handley as Billy Jensen
- Edgardo González as Emilio
- David Piggott as Max Mermelstein
- David Zaldivar as Rigo, a Cuban who helps Griselda and her family
- Christian Gnecco Quintero as Fabio Ochoa
- Oscar Camacho as Miguelito
- Goya Robles as Monkey Morales
- Marlene Forte as Esmeralda, Rigo's mother.
- Carter MacIntyre as Al Singleton
- Jeffrey Vincent Parise as Jon Roberts
- Natalie Masini as Sheila
- Michael Andrew Baker as Rodney

== Episodes ==
No.	Title	Directed by	Written by	Original release date
1	"Lady Comes to Town"	Andrés Baiz	Teleplay by : Ingrid Escajeda & Doug Miro; Story by : Doug Miro & Eric Newman & Carlo Bernard and Ingrid Escajeda & Doug Miro	January 25, 2024
2	"Rich White People"	Andrés Baiz	Brenna Kouf & Cassie Pappas and Doug Miro	January 25, 2024
3	"Mutiny"	Andrés Baiz	Teleplay by : Doug Miro; Story by : Doug Miro and Turi Meyer & Alfredo Septién	January 25, 2024
4	"Middle Management"	Andrés Baiz	Teleplay by : Doug Miro; Story by : Doug Miro & Gina Lucita Monreal	January 25, 2024
5	"Paradise Lost"	Andrés Baiz	Doug Miro & Ingrid Escajeda & Giovanna Sarquis	January 25, 2024
6	"Adios, Miami"	Andrés Baiz	Teleplay by : Doug Miro; Story by : Doug Miro & Ingrid Escajeda	January 25, 2024

== Production ==
=== Development ===
On November 3, 2021, it was reported that Netflix was in the process of developing a new crime drama miniseries based on the real life of Colombian drug trafficker Griselda Blanco. The miniseries would be produced by Eric Newman, Sofía Vergara, and Luis Balaguer for Latin World Entertainment. A Colombian native, Baiz directed all episodes. Baiz, with Doug Miro and Carlo Bernard, who are part of the Narcos creative team, would serve as executive producers, and Ingrid Escajeda and Miro would serve as showrunners. On January 19, 2022, Netflix released a first-look photo of Vergara in character as real-life drug queenpin Griselda Blanco, in a sneak peek of the upcoming limited series. The release also revealed 12 newly confirmed cast members, including Vanessa Ferlito and Juliana Aidén Martinez. The cast also includes Alberto Guerra, Alberto Ammann, Christian Tappan, Diego Trujillo, Paulina Davila, Gabriel Sloyer, Martin Rodriguez, José Zúñiga, Maximiliano Hernández, Julieth Restrepo and Carolina Giraldo (best known as Karol G—a famous singer from Medellín—in her first major acting role).

=== Filming ===
Filming for the miniseries began on January 17, 2022, in Los Angeles.

== Release ==
The series was released on Netflix on January 25, 2024.

== Reception ==
=== Audience viewership ===
During its debut week, Griselda debuted at number one in 90 countries and topped the Netflix Global Weekly Top 10 TV (English) chart, just three days after its release, with a total of 20.6 million viewers and 113.8 million hours viewed. It maintained the position in the following week, garnering 114.1 million viewing hours.

=== Critical response ===
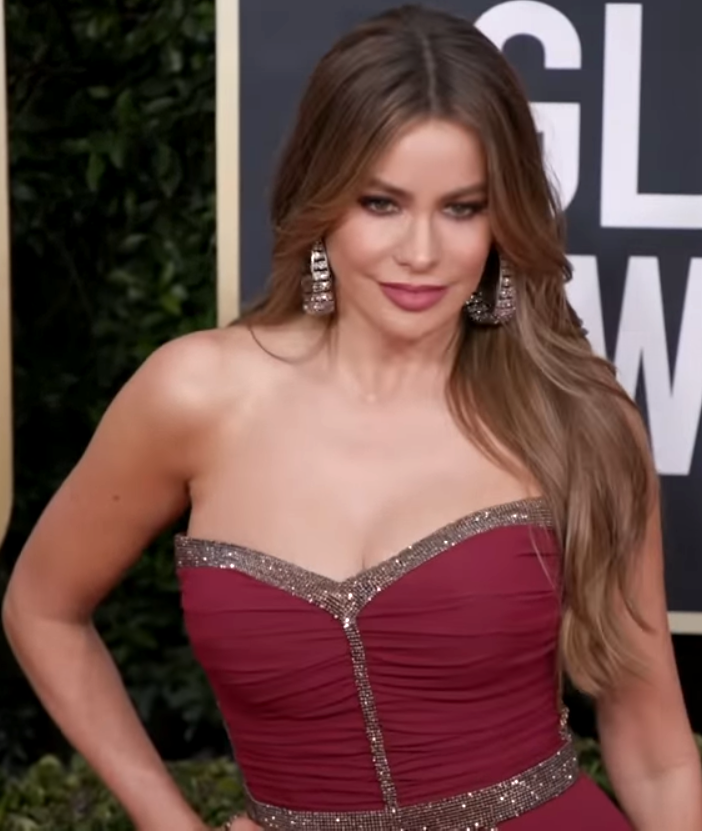
Sofía Vergara received widespread critical acclaim for her performance and garnered an Emmy nomination for Outstanding Lead Actress in a Limited or Anthology Series or Movie.

Griselda was met with generally positive reviews from critics, with praise for Vergara's performance, though some historical inaccuracies received criticism. On the review aggregator website Rotten Tomatoes, 87% of 52 critics' reviews are positive, with an average rating of 6.8/10. The website's consensus reads: "Sofía Vergara impressively disappears into the role of Griselda Blanco in this propulsive gangster saga, which plays loose with the facts but achieves genuine grit." Metacritic, which uses a weighted average, assigned the show a score of 64 out of 100 based on 19 critics, indicating "generally favorable reviews".

TVLine named Sofía Vergara their performer of the week, for the week of January 27, 2024, specifically for her performance in episode five, "Paradise Lost". The site deemed it a "career-defining" performance, writing that "Vergara's unwavering commitment and out-of-left-field gravitas elevates Griselda to one of those rare edge-of-your-seat TV experiences".

Some in Colombia have challenged aspects of the production for "glorif[ying] ... a bygone era of rampant violence and drugs" and Griselda as a heroine. Diego Cortes, an assistant professor of media studies at the University of Oregon, "said the series was regurgitating tired stereotypes" but was also highlighting the role of North Americans in "their role in the drug trafficking industry ... [as] cocaine customers" whom Griselda identified as a market.

=== Awards and nominations ===
Award	Date	Category	Nominee(s)	Result	Ref.
AARP Movies for Grownups Awards	January 11, 2025	Best Actress (TV/Streaming)	Sofía Vergara	Nominated	
Gold Derby TV Awards	August 14, 2024	Limited/Movie Actress	Sofía Vergara	Nominated	
Golden Globe Awards	January 5, 2025	Best Actress - Miniseries or Television Film	Sofía Vergara	Nominated	
Guild of Music Supervisors Awards	January 11, 2025	Best Music Supervision for a Trailer (Series)	Sanaz Lavaedian and Marina Polites	Nominated	
Imagen Awards	September 9, 2024	Best Director - Television	Andrés Baiz	Nominated	
Imagen Awards	September 9, 2024	Best Actress - Drama (Television)	Sofía Vergara	Won	
Imagen Awards	September 9, 2024	Best Supporting Actress - Drama (Television)	Juliana Aidén Martinez	Nominated	
Imagen Awards	September 9, 2024	Best Music Composition for Film or Television	Carlos Rafael Rivera	Nominated	
NAACP Image Awards	February 22, 2025	Outstanding Television Movie, Mini-Series or Special	Griselda	Nominated	
NAACP Image Awards	February 22, 2025	Outstanding Actress in a Television Movie, Mini-Series or Special	Sofía Vergara	Nominated	
Primetime Creative Arts Emmy Awards	September 8, 2024	Outstanding Cinematography for a Limited or Anthology Series or Movie	Armando Salas (for "Middle Management")	Nominated	
Primetime Creative Arts Emmy Awards	September 8, 2024	Outstanding Period Costumes for a Limited or Anthology Series or Movie	Safowa Bright Bitzelberger (for "Paradise Lost")	Nominated	
Primetime Emmy Awards	September 15, 2024	Outstanding Lead Actress in a Limited or Anthology Series or Movie	Sofía Vergara	Nominated	
Set Decorators Society of America Awards	August 5, 2024	Best Achievement in Decor/Design of a Television Movie or Limited Series	Knut Loewe and Kimberly Leonard	Nominated	
Society of Composers & Lyricists Awards	February 12, 2025	Outstanding Original Title Sequence for a Television Production	Carlos Rafael Rivera	Nominated	

== Lawsuit ==
Michael Corleone Blanco, the real life son of Blanco, and his wife, Marie, sued Netflix, Vergara, and others over the series due to alleged unauthorized usage of the family's "image, likeness, and/or identity" without consent or compensation in January 2024. The suit was dismissed with prejudice in February 2024.
