= Cocaine Godmother =

- Poster
- Directed by: Guillermo Navarro
- Written by: David McKenna; Molly McAlpine
- Produced by: Jamie Goehring; Shawn Williamson; S. Lilly Hui
- Starring: Catherine Zeta-Jones; Raúl Méndez; Juan Pablo Espinosa
- Cinematography: Guillermo Navarro
- Edited by: Luis Carballar
- Music by: Eduardo Aram
- Production companies: Asylum Entertainment; Lighthouse Pictures
- Distributed by: Lifetime
- Release dates: November 12, 2017 (Camerimage); January 20, 2018 (Lifetime)
- Running time: 100 minutes
- Country: United States
- Languages: English; Spanish

Cocaine Godmother is a 2017 American biographical crime drama film directed by Guillermo Navarro and written by David McKenna. The film stars Catherine Zeta-Jones as Griselda Blanco, who was known as the Cocaine Godmother. It premiered at the 2017 Camerimage in Poland and showed on Lifetime channel on January 20, 2018.

== Plot ==
Griselda Blanco grows up in poverty in Colombia, and commits her first murder after being forced into childhood prostitution. She eventually comes to live in the US with her first husband and three sons Dixon, Uber, and Osvaldo. She earns money by creating fake passports for cocaine smugglers, and moves into the smuggling trade herself when she realizes that using beautiful women as mules will lower the chances of them being caught.

Griselda, fed up with her abusive marriage, leaves her husband and takes her children. She meets Carolina, an American woman with whom she begins a romance. Griselda soon gets remarried to a man named Alberto Bravo, but keeps Carolina as a companion for years.

After moving to Miami, Griselda's drug empire quickly grows. She comes up with the idea to put assassins on motorcycles as they will be able to move around the city faster than with cars. She does business with Pablo Escobar back in Colombia, and becomes the queen of the cocaine trade. As a result, Miami sees a steep rise in crime.

Griselda and her family are pushed to the edge by the stress of their illegal business. Her three eldest sons have all become dangerous gangsters. Her marriage falls apart and Carolina dies of a drug overdose. Her fourth son Michael, fathered by her most recent boyfriend Darío Sepúlveda, is kidnapped and it takes weeks to get him back home. Griselda, herself, develops an addiction to smoking cocaine that makes her increasingly irrational and unreliable.

The DEA have been watching her operation for years. She moves to Los Angeles to lie low, but is eventually found and arrested along with her three sons while Michael is sent to live with a relative in Miami. Griselda serves limited jail time thanks to the loyalty she commands among her minions.

After doing her time, she is deported back to Colombia where she lives a lonely existence after two of her sons were killed by assailants and the other one commits suicide before he can be killed. She dies an old woman when an assassin on a motorcycle shoots her on the street. The narrator concludes that Griselda "is now free."

== Cast ==
- Catherine Zeta-Jones as Griselda Blanco
  - Isabella Sierra as young Griselda Blanco
- Raúl Méndez as Darío Sepúlveda
- Juan Pablo Espinosa as Alberto Bravo
- Warren Christie as Jimmy (DEA)
- Matteo Stefan as Dixon Trujillo Blanco
  - Matthew Hooper as Toddler Dixon Trujillo Blanco
  - Jonah Stark as Young Dixon Trujillo Blanco
- Spencer Borgeson as Osvaldo Trujillo Blanco
  - Jaden Rain as Young Oswaldo
- José Julián as Uber Trujillo Blanco
  - Stefan Djuric as Toddler Uber
- Jenny Pellicer as Carolina
- Alejandro Edda as Rodolfo (Rudi)
- Dagan Nish as Michael Corleone Blanco (uncredited)
  - Evan Hugh Ocean Conn as Baby Michael Blanco (uncredited)
  - Lauren Guci as Young Michael Corleone Blanco

== Reception ==
Writing for IndieWire, Hanh Nguyen criticized the decision to cast Zeta-Jones in the part of a Latina woman, adding that "she's not just unconvincing; she's outlandish". Similarly, Ciara LaVelle of the Miami New Times called the movie "campy" and "sexist"; and felt that Zeta-Jones "struggles to embody the role of a 17-year-old Colombian immigrant, and though her portrayal solidifies as the story progresses, her accent remains cringeworthy throughout. (At least in her later, allegedly cocaine-addicted years, you can blame it on the drugs.)"
