= American Desperado =

Memoir by Jon Roberts

- Front cover
- Author: Jon Roberts and Evan Wright
- Language: English
- Genre: Memoir, Crime, Military
- Publisher: Crown
- Publication date: November 1, 2011
- Publication place: United States
- Media type: Hardcover, Ebook
- Pages: 512
- ISBN: 978-0-307-45042-5

American Desperado is a 2011 book written by journalist Evan Wright and drug smuggler Jon Roberts, a subject of the 2006 documentary Cocaine Cowboys. It also briefly touches on his later life and his relationship with Jason King from Revere, Massachusetts.

== Synopsis ==
American Desperado is the reminiscences of Jon Roberts (born John Riccobono), connected together by biographical sections written by co-author Evan Wright.

== Reviews ==
Doug Stanton wrote:

Imagine if Mister Kurtz from Heart of Darkness sat down with Dick Cavett for a little chat about the nature of good and evil, empathy, fatherhood, violence, drugs, power, self-knowledge, women, family, the hero versus the anti-hero, freedom, imprisonment ... Reading American Desperado is like being in a sumptuous ballroom somewhere and somebody lets loose a cobra across the cold, shiny floor – "Oops, there it goes, watch the hell out!" Jon Roberts, the hero/anti-hero of this tale, is a shape-shifter: you can't really draw a bead on him even though his voice and Evan Wright's voice are singular and bell-clear; the story is a giant pane of smoked glass the color of silver and violet, and the story seems to change colors as you read. What is true is that, try as you might, you can't really put this book down.

Jerry Stahl described it:

American Desperado is the first great crime book of the 21st century. Dangerous, darkly hilarious, hair-raising, and terrifically written, Wright's prose spills over with the kind of insane, brilliantly rendered detail and dialogue that make you want to call people at four in the morning and read out loud. Imagine a literary mash-up of Capote and Carl Hiaasen, Joan Didion and Elmore Leonard – with something all the author's own: the heart and guts to place himself in the real-life world of non-stop menace and imminent violence, riding side by side with a killer so matter-of-fact vicious that murder itself is as unremarkable as the tasty breakfasts he loves to cook for houseguests. Fans wondering how Evan Wright would top himself after his balls-out performance in the Iraq War classic Generation Kill can rest assured. In this portrait of the original Cocaine Cowboy, Wright has once again walked in the shadow of death and emerged, not just alive, but with a story so compelling, so flat-out, what-happens-next riveting you can forget about sleeping, eating or talking to loved ones until you claw your way to the last indelible page ... How fearless and brilliant a writer is Evan Wright? If Hemingway were alive, he'd probably want to punch him in the face.

== Controversies ==
A 2009 Miami New Times article reported that Jon Roberts worked for a time as a police informant, quoting court records indicating Roberts assaulted and injured several police officers after he had claimed to have renounced crime and noted an arrest for domestic violence. The article also includes threats Roberts made to the reporter who interviewed him.
