= Mickey Munday =

American drug trafficker

Michael "Mickey" Munday (born June 29, 1945) is an American former drug trafficker and former associate of Colombia's Medellin Cartel during the growth phase in cocaine trafficking, 1975–1986. Munday was featured in the 2006 Rakontur documentary, Cocaine Cowboys.

Internationally renowned for his abilities to circumvent law enforcement's efforts to capture and arrest him by boat or airplane during Miami's cocaine epidemic, Munday was often referred to as the "MacGyver" of cocaine smugglers.

Now known as "The last surviving Cocaine Cowboy,” Munday made his living as an actor, writer, speaker and storyteller in between stints in prison. His CD Tall Tales is a collection of anecdotes about his days as a smuggler.

In April 2018, a federal judge sentenced Munday to a 12-year prison sentence after he was found guilty on auto fraud-conspiracy charges.

== Early life ==
Munday was born and raised in Miami, Florida. His father, George "Sunny" Munday was a professional football player, who played four seasons in the NFL and was a machine shop owner. His mother, Dorothy Duncan, was a former Miss Ohio beauty queen and school teacher, who taught at North Miami Junior High school until her retirement in 1976. Mickey has one sibling, a younger brother.

When Munday was 13 years old, his father put him to work at the family-owned concrete business, M Block. There he learned how to manufacture and design concrete ventilation, benches, tables, fences, and stepping stones.

In 1971, Munday took over M Blocks after his father became ill and subsequently retired. He ran the company until 1978, closing it after a rapid decline in construction in Florida.

From 1972 through 1978, Munday owned and operated several different businesses simultaneously. In 1972, he opened Mike's Bike Shop, specializing in high-performance motorcycles. In 1975, he opened Ultimate Boats, a custom boat manufacturing company specializing in open fish and speed boats. In 1980, he founded LC Towing.

== Introduction to trafficking ==
The sudden death of a close friend, in 1978, left Munday responsible for removing unwanted contraband from his friend's warehouse before the man's grieving parents found it. Having thought it was only 2–10 pounds of marijuana, Munday was shocked to discover 2,000 pounds of marijuana inside a locked room.

After clearing out the room, Munday gave the pot to a friend, who sold it and gave Munday $165,000 from the sale.

After careful consideration and extensive planning, Munday purchased his first plane, a 680 Aero Commander, and began transporting marijuana from South America to the US, devising methods of avoiding unwanted attention from law enforcement agencies along the way.

In 1980, Max Mermelstein, an American associate of the Medellin Cartel, was introduced to Jon Roberts, who was in need of a direct supplier of cocaine into the United States. Munday introduced Roberts to Rafael Cardona Salazar, a high-ranking member of the Medellin Cartel and Pablo Escobar's American connection.

== Downfall ==
Max Mermelstein was arrested in 1985 by Miami Police, as a multi-kilo dealer, and was implicated by a California trafficker who gave information to the US Customs Service (the predecessor to Homeland Security Investigations) in exchange for a lighter sentence. Mermelstein turned state's witness against the Medellin Cartel after his arrest and provided information that led to the subsequent raids on Munday's properties on September 20, 1986.

Munday, a step ahead of law enforcement, had held agents at bay by opening the gas tank of a cocaine-laden plane and pointing a flare gun at several 55-gallon gasoline drums nearby. US Customs agents were noted as saying it was a standoff, and Munday escaped. Munday then fled into the Florida swamps, which he knew very well, and managed to elude capture by federal authorities until 1992, when he was finally arrested in Richmond, Virginia, by U.S. Marshals. He was sentenced to 10 years in a federal correction facility and was released on December 9, 1999.

== Personal life ==
Munday, who has never married, has an adopted daughter and three grandchildren. He lived in South Florida in between 2 prison sentences from 1999 to 2018, where he enjoyed his local celebrity status as the last surviving "Cocaine Cowboy" and was coined by Miami New Times reporter Gus Garcia Roberts as "A South Florida Local Treasure".

The Telegraph's Jacqui Goddard reports that Munday lived a low-key, frugal lifestyle both during his heyday as a drug trafficker and does so presently:

While his cocaine cohorts cruised Miami in Lamborghinis and Ferraris, Munday largely eschewed the flashy lifestyle that his tens of millions of dollars in fees could have bought him, figuring that it was better not to draw attention to himself. He channelled most of his cash into buying property, which was all forfeited after he was prosecuted. He now lives what he admits is a "frugal existence" in Miami, getting around on a pedal bicycle with his fashion-defying long, blond hair flowing behind him, his look perhaps more Dog the Bounty Hunter than Miami Vice.

Until his 2018 arrest, Munday became the last "Cocaine Cowboy" standing "who is still alive and not behind bars" following Griselda Blanco's murder in September 2012.

Munday worked occasionally as a resource for SOUTHCOM (US Military's Southern Command)'s research partnership with Florida International University. In that capacity, he has twice been invited to speak to members of such crime-fighting agencies as the DEA, the FBI, Immigration and Customs Enforcement, U.S. Coast Guard, police, and armed forces, to share information helpful to counter-narcotics and counter-terrorism strategies.

In 2016, Munday converted a vacant lot near his North Miami home into a community park that he named "Love-Lock Park".

In April 2018, Munday was convicted in an inter-state auto fraud-conspiracy and sentenced to 12 years in prison. Munday is currently in prison.

== See also ==
- Cocaine Cowboys
- Medellín Cartel
