= Jon Roberts =

American drug trafficker (1948–2011)

- Roberts' 1986 mugshot
- Born: John Riccobono; June 21, 1948; New York City, New York, U.S.
- Died: December 28, 2011 (aged 63); Hollywood, Florida, U.S.
- Other names: Jon Pernell Roberts; "The Bearded Gringo"
- Occupations: Drug trafficker; soldier; nightclub owner; government witness
- Allegiance: Gambino crime family; Medellín Cartel

Jon Pernell Roberts (born John Riccobono; June 21, 1948 – December 28, 2011) was an American drug trafficker who operated in the Miami area and was an associate of the Colombian Medellín Cartel during the growth phase in cocaine trafficking, 1975–1986. Roberts was the author with Evan Wright of American Desperado.

== Early life ==
The son of Sicilian-American mafioso Nat Riccobono, Roberts was born John Riccobono and raised in the Little Italy neighborhood of Manhattan in New York City. Nat Riccobono, an associate of Lucky Luciano, had emigrated illegally to the United States with his brothers from Sicily and was a caporegime in the Gambino crime family, operating gambling and loan-sharking operations in black neighborhoods of New York and New Jersey. Roberts' uncle, Joseph "Staten Island Joe" Riccobono, was consigliere of the Gambino family. As a child, Roberts accompanied his father on collection rounds as his father beat delinquent debtors. At the age of seven, he witnessed his father shoot a man to death in a traffic dispute.

Nat Riccobono was deported from the United States following a federal crackdown on the Mafia in the late 1950s, after which Roberts' mother had his surname changed. Roberts' mother died during a medical operation when he was thirteen years old, and he subsequently lived with his stepfather and then with various relatives, including a sister in Brunswick, Maine. In the early 1960s, Roberts was a member of the Outcasts, an Italian-American street gang in Teaneck, New Jersey. At the age of sixteen, he returned to New York and began working for his loan shark uncles as an enforcer and debt collector.

In 1965, at the age of seventeen, Roberts was arrested for kidnapping and attempted murder after a severely beaten debtor escaped from a basement "with a chair tied to him and no clothes on". Roberts later made claims that he was given an opportunity to expunge his criminal record with military service and subsequently joined the United States Army, serving for five years. However, none of his claims about his military service could be verified.

== Alleged military service ==
Roberts claimed to have served with the 101st Airborne for four years in Vietnam, though no records could be found proving his military service.

In American Desperado, Roberts recounts his service, saying that he enjoyed Army life. He made claims that he had served on a long-range reconnaissance patrol team and was selected for missions to carry out assassinations in Cambodia. According to Roberts, he and his team committed a variety of atrocities, including killing children and women of all ages, and torturing and skinning alive Viet Cong in retaliation for the enemy committing similar atrocities. In a 2009 interview with Gus Garcia-Roberts of the Miami New Times, Roberts said of his time in Vietnam: "I thought it was great. There were no rules. You could kill people, do whatever you want." In 2011, he told Guy Raz of All Things Considered: "Nobody really controlled us. And eventually after you do this for a while, you decide you're pretty much your own boss. And to me it was an education in how to do things."

Despite all of Roberts' claims about his time in Vietnam, journalist Evan Wright who profiled his life in the book American Desperado found absolutely no records of him ever serving in the military. This included a Freedom of Information request to the National Archives which showed no data on him ever fighting in the War in Vietnam or serving in the military. Jon was also unable to supply any material evidence of his service, including medals, pictures or memorabilia.

== Criminal career ==
=== Gambino crime family ===
Roberts was an alleged associate in the Gambino family. Roberts has confessed to committing extortion, assault, money laundering, and racketeering in the early 1970s.

=== Introduction to the Medellín Cartel ===
As demand for cocaine increased, Roberts found his Cuban suppliers unable to meet his demand. Through Roberts' girlfriend, Toni Mooney (aka Toni Moon, a model and aspiring actress), he met Mickey Munday. Munday was a trafficker who introduced Roberts to Medellín agent Rafael Cardona Salazar. At first, Munday was apprehensive of Roberts, who had driven up in a black Mercedes-Benz, which Munday described as having "drug dealer written all over it". He also stated that Roberts' flashy car and flamboyant lifestyle made Roberts look like "someone I wanted nothing to do with".

Nevertheless, Roberts and Munday began working under the supervision of Max Mermelstein, who had an agreement with Salazar to manage the transportation of cocaine from Colombia to Miami. He then oversaw the delivery of the loads to cartel safehouses in the Miami area. Roberts was able to increase his monthly cocaine business through this direct connection. Mermelstein and Munday established the routes for trips to Colombia, using boats, tow truck companies, safehouses, and airstrips, thereby setting up an effective transportation route for the cartel. Roberts claims to have made over $100 million dealing cocaine during this period. He spent $50 million of that money on his extravagant lifestyle. In the book American Desperado, Roberts claims that he had $150 million in a Panamanian bank, over $50 million invested in real estate and businesses, as well as several million in cash hidden in various safe houses and hiding spaces.

=== Racehorses ===
In American Desperado, Roberts describes: "After I made my first big score selling coke to Bernie Levine in California, Danny Mones told me racehorses were a good way to launder money." He and Danny Mones "started Mephisto Stables in 1977".

In chapter 62 of the book, Roberts recounts a variety of processes by which he used horses to launder money. Additionally, "[He] also learned how to fix races. There were many tricks."

Also in chapter 62, Roberts describes another benefit to horses: "Dealing cocaine had promoted me into high society. Owning racehorses took me into the stratosphere." He recounts prominent people he met through his racehorse connections, such as "Judge Joe Johnson, who hosted horse auctions", and through him, "We got friendly with Cliff Perlman, who owned Caesars Palace. When I'd go to Caesar's and get comped, everybody assumed it was because of my Mafia connections. No, I was connected to Caesars Palace by a Kentucky judge." Through the same circle, "We ended up becoming friends with Al Tannenbaum and his girlfriend, Gloria. Al was a guy who'd made it big in stereos."

He describes a particular horse in the epigraph to his book:

Desperado, the horse that I thought would win the Derby and make me famous as something more than a gangster, was a baby when I got him. He hadn't been trained how to run, but he could already fly on the grass. He had good instincts. He didn't like other horses. You don't want a sociable horse. They stay in the pack. You want a horse who likes to run in front of all the other horses. Desperado was a killer. I named him Desperado because I saw myself in his eyes.

Roberts also describes an honest jockey he had hired, and that jockey's demise:

At Calder, I had a jockey named Nick Navarro who worked for me. He was one of the good guys. He wouldn't hold horses or charge them or run them on dope. He was very skilled, and when I ran my horses clean, I used Nick.

One day in 1977 [sic] he ran a race for me at Calder. I walked up to him after he finished. He put his hand up to wave, and there was a powerful explosion. A bolt of lightning came out of the sky and hit him.

Multiple news outlet reports support Roberts' recollection, except they fix the date one year later. As they document: on December 28, 1978, jockey Niconar "Nick" Navarro was killed by a direct lightning strike after completing the second race at Calder Race Course. The remaining eight races at the track that day were cancelled.

=== Downfall ===
Mermelstein acted as a high-level trafficker working under cartel member Salazar and with the Munday transportation group. He was apprehended in 1985 by the US Customs Service as a multi-kilo dealer, and subsequently turned state's witness. Roberts was arrested on the morning of September 20, 1986.

== Later years and death ==
According to his ex-wife and various other sources, Roberts used his past to gain trust within the criminal community and report their activities to the authorities in order to maintain his prison-free status. Others have also accused Roberts of being a confidential informant; one of the Fort Lauderdale police officers who arrested him in 1997 for stalking an ex-girlfriend, possession of a firearm, and resisting arrest with violence testified he "found out later he's been a snitch or something. He was a CI [confidential informant] for somebody."

In a 2009 Miami New Times article, Roberts' lifestyle when he lived in Hollywood, Florida, was described as follows:

Former mega-smuggler Jon Roberts, who flooded Miami with $2 billion worth of cocaine in the '80s, naps away his days in a quiet lakefront Hollywood home. But soon, if what he says is true, a book, a high-octane movie, and videogame contracts will again make him a player. But he doesn't want you to know this. He's worried this article could spoil the publicity for his book deal. When I told him last week this story would be published, the craggy, gray-mustached ex-gangster vowed, "You will never write another word in this town again... I will go on TV and tell them everything in your article is bold-faced lies. I hope you get hit by a truck, you little scumbag." "The outburst is in character with Roberts' gangster-flick biography, which he described in an on-the-record interview before changing his mind about publication".

In 2011, Garcia-Roberts interviewed Roberts' American Desperado co-author Evan Wright for a Miami New Times article (coincidentally dated one month before Roberts' death). In the article, titled "American Desperado: Co-Author Evan Wright on Coke Cowboy Jon Roberts' Memoir", the two authors discuss the book as well as their impressions and experiences when interviewing Roberts. For example, they share that Roberts was not completely reformed in his later days:

Garcia-Roberts: In the book, you write that Jon--who as a felon is not allowed to have guns--showed you silencers he kept buried in his backyard. One of his dogs regularly killed other dogs and cats in the neighborhood. Were you ever afraid during your time staying with Jon in Hollywood? Wright: Jon doesn't live in Hollywood anymore, and he's very sick, so I think I can say this. My most uncomfortable moment came when I was doing an interview, and he gets a call. He says, "Oh, that's my police friends. They're selling me some unmarked guns."

Roberts died of colorectal cancer on December 28, 2011, aged 63.

== See also ==
- Cocaine Cowboys
- Griselda (miniseries)
- Mickey Munday
- Max Mermelstein
