= Barry Seal =

American drug smuggler (1939–1986)

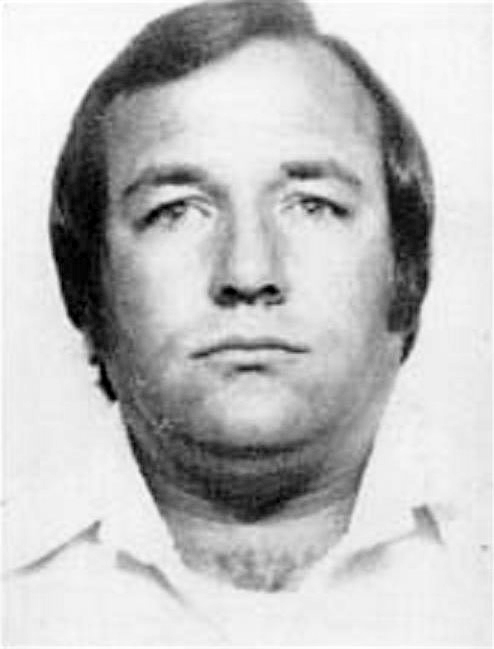
- Seal in 1980
- Born: Adler Berriman Seal; July 16, 1939; Baton Rouge, Louisiana, U.S.
- Died: February 19, 1986 (aged 46); Baton Rouge, Louisiana, U.S.
- Cause of death: Gunshot wounds
- Other name: El Gordo ("the fat one")
- Occupations: Pilot; drug smuggler; gun smuggler
- Spouses: Barbara Dodson (m. 1963; div. 1971); Lynn Ross (m. 1971; div. 1972); Deborah Dubois (m. 1973)
- Children: 6
- Criminal charges: Conspiracy to smuggle narcotics, guns

Adler Berriman "Barry" Seal (July 16, 1939 – February 19, 1986) was an American commercial airline pilot who became a major drug smuggler for the Medellín Cartel. When Seal was convicted of smuggling charges, he became an informant for the Drug Enforcement Administration and testified in several major drug trials. He was murdered on February 19, 1986, by contract killers hired by the cartel.

== Early life and career ==
Adler Berriman Seal was born in Baton Rouge, Louisiana, the son of Mary Lou (née Delcambre) and Benjamin Curtis Seal, a candy wholesaler. Seal began to fly as a teenager, earning a student pilot certificate at 16 and a private pilot's certificate at 17. His flight instructor described him as a naturally gifted pilot.

In 1962, Seal enlisted in the Louisiana Army National Guard for six years: six months of active duty, followed by five and a half years of inactive duty. Seal's active duty began in July 1962. He was assigned to the 20th Special Forces Group and graduated from the United States Army Airborne School selection and training. His non-active duty was served in the 245th Engineer Battalion, where his military occupation code was radio telephone operator.

In 1964, Seal joined TWA as a flight engineer and was soon promoted to the first officer, then captain, flying a Boeing 707 on a regular Western Europe route. He was one of the youngest 707 command pilots in the TWA fleet. Seal's career with TWA ended in July 1972, when he was arrested for involvement in a conspiracy to smuggle a shipment of plastic explosives to Mexico using a DC-4. The case was eventually dismissed in 1974 for prosecutorial misconduct, but in the meantime TWA fired Seal, who had falsely taken medical leave to participate in the scheme.

== Drug smuggling ==
Seal admitted that he started smuggling small amounts of marijuana by air in early 1976. By 1978, he had expanded to flying significant loads of cocaine, pound-for-pound a much more profitable enterprise than marijuana smuggling.

Seal's operations received an important boost when he was arrested and jailed in Honduras on the return leg of a drug-smuggling trip to Ecuador. Seal made important connections while in prison in Honduras, including Emile Camp, a fellow Louisiana pilot and smuggler who became one of Seal's closest associates, and Ellis McKenzie, a local Honduran smuggler. Also, after his release from prison Seal met William Roger Reaves on the flight back to the U.S. It was Reaves who provided Seal with his first connection to the Medellín Cartel.

To expand his smuggling capacity, Seal also hired William Bottoms, his ex-brother-in-law, as a pilot. From 1980 on, Bottoms was the main pilot in Seal's smuggling enterprise, often flying with Camp while Seal oversaw planning and operations.

In 1981, Seal began smuggling cocaine for the Medellín Cartel. At his peak, he earned as much as $500,000 per flight transporting shipments of cocaine from Colombia to the United States.

Seal's smuggling method was to use low-flying planes and airdrop drug packages in remote areas of Louisiana. They were then picked up by Seal's ground team and transported to the Colombian distributors in Florida. By 1982, Seal was using over a dozen aircraft in his smuggling operation. The number of planes and the frequency of flights soon attracted the attention of Louisiana State Police and Federal investigators.

To avoid this unwanted attention, Seal moved his aircraft to Mena Intermountain Regional Airport in Mena, Arkansas, where he did maintenance and modifications to improve the planes' carrying capacity and avionics. Seal's activities in Mena later became the subject of rumor and controversy, but according to Seal's biographer, former FBI agent Del Hahn, Seal did not use Mena as a drug transshipment point. However, an "extensive joint investigation" by the FBI, Arkansas State Police, and IRS revealed in 2020 that Barry Seal had in fact used the Mena airport for "smuggling activity" from late 1980 until March 1984.

=== Florida indictments and convictions ===
By 1981, DEA agents in Florida were aware of Seal's smuggling activities. In April 1981, a DEA informant introduced Seal to an undercover DEA agent. After several months of contact, the undercover agent negotiated a deal with Seal to smuggle 1,200 pounds of methaqualone tablets into the United States (the tablets were counterfeits, made of chalk). The investigation into Seal was part of a major undercover operation called Operation Screamer in which over 80 pilots were eventually indicted. Two indictments were returned against Seal in March 1983. The first indictment charged Seal alone with two counts of conspiracy to distribute methaqualone. The second indictment charged Seal and three others with multiple counts of possession and distribution of methaqualone, phenobarbital, and meperidine.

Seal surrendered to federal authorities at the end of April 1983 and attempted to make a deal, first with the Florida task force, then with the Baton Rouge task force. Both rejected any deals, even though Seal told them a little about his involvement with the Ochoa family. Without a deal, Seal was tried in February 1984. After a month-long trial, Seal was convicted on all counts listed by the first indictment.

== Undercover work ==
In March 1984, now facing a ten-year prison sentence, Seal decided to contact the South Florida Task Force - a cross-agency drug interdiction team led by then-Vice President George H. W. Bush. The office referred Seal to the DEA headquarters, which assigned DEA agent Ernst Jacobsen to debrief Seal and evaluate his potential as an informant. Jacobsen was impressed with Seal's connections, especially those with the Ochoa family. On March 28, Seal signed a letter in which he agreed to act as a DEA informant. Afterwards, Seal pleaded guilty to the second indictment in Florida. Seal was then released from custody, with the terms of his sentence dependent upon his performance as an informant.

The South Florida Task Force planned an operation that directed Seal to set up a cocaine purchase with the Ochoas and other cartel members, which would provide a basis for future indictments in the United States. Seal had concealed his true identity in previous dealings with the cartel by using the name Ellis McKenzie (an associate that Seal had previously worked with). Through his cartel contacts in Miami, Seal arranged a meeting using the same alias. He flew down to Medellín for the meeting on April 8, and was accompanied by a Miami based cartel pilot who was unaware of Seal's role as an informant.

=== In Nicaragua ===
Participants at the meeting included Pablo Escobar, Jorge Ochoa, Fabio Ochoa, and Juan Ochoa. The Colombian government had recently conducted a major raid on the cartel's manufacturing facilities at a remote jungle location called Tranquilandia, resulting in the destruction of millions of dollars of both processed and unprocessed cocaine. Seal's claims about this meeting and its aftermath, as presented by the Reagan administration, were denied by the Sandinista government and resulted in serious scrutiny by the media.

According to Seal, the traffickers were making arrangements to set up shipping and production facilities in Nicaragua, where they had struck a deal with the Sandinista government. These arrangements were not yet complete, so Seal's first shipment was to be a direct flight to the U.S. Originally planned for mid-April, the flight did not take place until the end of May. When it did, the overloaded plane crashed at the Colombia airfield on takeoff. The cartel provided a new plane, but it lacked the capacity for a direct flight to the U.S., so the cartel arranged a stopover in Nicaragua, which was earlier than the originally planned stopover at an airfield in Los Brasiles near Managua. After refueling, Seal left Los Brasiles, flying without lights, and was fired upon by Nicaraguan military units as he flew near Managua. The plane was hit by gunfire, and Seal had to make an emergency landing at Sandino International Airport in Managua. The drugs were unloaded by the military, and Seal and his co-pilot were taken to detention in downtown Managua. They were then released to the cartel's Nicaraguan contact, Federico Vaughan. This account was criticized by reporter Jonathan Kwitny, then working as a staff reporter at the Wall Street Journal, in a critique of the administration's claims in April 1987, who pointed out that the Administration had earlier referred to Los Brasiles as a military facility, while later acknowledging it to be a civilian field primarily used by crop-dusters, as the field was listed at the time by Department of Defense documentation.

According to a Federal grand jury's indictment, Vaughan was an aide to Tomás Borge, Nicaraguan Minister of the Interior. This allegation was challenged by multiple reporters and congressional inquiries following the subsequent leaking of the story. Kwinty reported that Vaughn had worked in the interior ministry as the deputy manager of a state-run import-export business, and not as aide to Borge. In 1988, the Chair of the House Judiciary Subcommittee on Crime, William J. Hughes, released further information regarding Vaughn. The subcommittee affirmed that Escobar and his associates were operating from Nicaragua, but also cast doubt regarding Vaughn's ties. Hughes stated that subcommittee staff had called Vaughn's number, only to discover that the Managua residence had been rented since 1981 by a recently expelled member of the US embassy staff. Hughes also raised several references to a "Freddy Vaughn", particularly in July 1984, in Oliver North's diary, although it was not conclusively established if this referred to the same individual.

In Managua, Seal met again with Pablo Escobar, who was setting up a cocaine lab for production. After a discussion about how to move the increased flow of cocaine, Escobar decided to keep the first shipment in Nicaragua and have Seal return to the States and buy a larger plane.

The plane Seal acquired was a C-123K, a large aircraft used primarily for military transport. Before returning to Nicaragua, the DEA arranged for CIA technicians to install hidden cameras inside the plane.

Seal returned to the Los Brasiles airfield in Nicaragua on June 25. The pickup went as planned this time, and the cameras successfully photographed Seal and several individuals loading cocaine, aided by Pablo Escobar, José Gonzalo Rodríguez Gacha (another important cartel member), and Federico Vaughan. On his return to the U.S., Seal landed at Homestead Air Force Base and the drugs were transferred into a Winnebago camper, which Seal turned over to his Colombian contact. The Reagan administration would later claim that the men assisting Seal, Gacha and Escobar were Sandinista soldiers, but none of the men was dressed in military uniform.

The drugs could not be distributed, and the immediate arrest of those handling the vehicle would suggest to the Colombians that Seal had betrayed them, so DEA agents staged an accident with the camper, allowing the driver to escape. Unfortunately, the driver was arrested by local police, and the circumstances of the seizure raised the suspicions of the cartel.

Seal said he made one more trip to Nicaragua on July 7, bringing money to Escobar to pay the Nicaraguans for landing rights. Another shipment was also planned at this time, but under instructions from the DEA, Seal told Escobar his landing site was under DEA surveillance and unsafe for transport to avoid the need to seize a second load. The DEA felt this would be impossible to explain away, and Seal returned to the U.S. without cargo.

The DEA plan was to keep Seal working with the cartel on other parts of the supply chain, such as moving cocaine base into Nicaragua from Colombia and inspecting smuggling airfields in Mexico and the U.S. The ultimate hope was to arrest the cartel leaders in a jurisdiction where it would be easy to extract them.

However, the Nicaragua undercover operation came to an end soon after Seal's return from his second trip when it was reported in the press. A leak regarding the operation came to light before Seal's second trip. On June 29, General Paul F. Gorman, US Military Commander Southern Command, made a speech stating the US had evidence that elements of the Nicaraguan government were involved in drug smuggling, though Gorman did not mention Seal or the undercover flights. It is not clear whether Seal and his crew were informed of this before they returned to Nicaragua.

A more detailed account of American efforts in Nicaragua appeared on July 17 in an article by reporter Edmond Jacoby, published on the front page of the Washington Times. Although not a complete account, it gave enough information to spell an end to Seal's work with the cartel, and to the DEA's hopes of capturing the cartel leaders outside of Colombia.

=== In the U.S. ===
Following the exposure of the Nicaraguan investigation, the DEA had to move quickly to arrest the cartel distributors in Miami. The DEA had been informed before the publication of the Jacoby article, so they were still able to have Seal set up a meeting with the chief cartel supervisor in Miami, Carlos Bustamonte, and arrested him on July 17, along with other cartel employees.

The evidence acquired from the arrest, plus the evidence gathered by Seal, provided the basis for the first drug trafficking indictment in the U.S. against Escobar and the Ochoas.

Despite the exposure, Seal was able to put together a second major undercover operation for the DEA later that year. This operation involved a long, complicated cocaine shipment from Bolivia, refueling in Colombia, refueling again in Texas, and delivering the cocaine in Las Vegas. The DEA refused to let Seal leave the country due to the danger he was in, so Seal arranged for his ex-brother-in-law William Bottoms to make the flight. The flight, in January 1985, was successful and led to arrests and convictions.

In February, Seal also played a central role in an undercover operation against Norman Saunders, chief minister of the Turks and Caicos Islands, a British colony south of the Bahamas. Saunders was videotaped paying a bribe to Seal in Miami, and was also successfully prosecuted.

=== Continuing legal problems ===
While Seal had come to an agreement with the DEA and the Florida drug task force in March 1984, he was still under active investigation by state and federal authorities in Baton Rouge, Louisiana, and Little Rock, Arkansas. In October 1984, a grand jury in Louisiana was convened and began interviewing witnesses against Seal. Seal attempted to push back against the investigation by appearing in a television news series broadcast by WBRZ in Baton Rouge in November 1984. The documentary series, titled "Uncle Sam Wants You", ran on five consecutive evenings. It included an interview where Seal denied he was a smuggler and depicted Seal as harassed by the government. The state narcotics agents who were investigating Seal in Baton Rouge sued over their depiction in the series, but the lawsuit was dismissed.

Soon after the broadcast, the heads of the Florida and Louisiana task forces met to work out an agreement that would allow Seal to continue working with the Florida task force and testify as a witness at trial. They agreed to a sentence for Seal's Louisiana activities no greater than the sentence he received for his Florida smuggling, with both sentences to run concurrently.

== Sentencing ==
Seal was taken into federal custody in June 1985 and spent several months testifying in court. He was the primary witness in three trials: the trial of Saunders and the other Turks and Caicos officials in July; the trial of the cartel distributors in Miami in August; the trial of the cartel distributors who had arranged the shipment of cocaine from Bolivia to Las Vegas, also in August. All three trials resulted in convictions for all defendants. Seal also made a public appearance before the President's Commission on Organized Crime, recounting his experiences as a drug smuggler.

=== In Florida ===
Following his testimony in the Miami trials, Seal appeared in Florida court again over his second indictment in the Big Screamer operation. Although Seal had pleaded guilty, with the support of his DEA supervisors, he was sentenced to five years of unsupervised probation. Following his testimony in Las Vegas, Seal spent another month in a witness protection center. In October 1985 he returned to court over the first indictment in Big Screamer, for which he had originally been sentenced to ten years. After listening to summaries of Seal's successful work for the DEA, Judge Norman Roettger sentenced Seal to time served (a little over three months in witness protection) and three years probation.

=== In Louisiana ===
When Seal received only time served and probation, Louisiana state and federal drug investigators were faced with a dilemma. They had anticipated Seal would serve substantial time in Florida and were now bound by the agreement Florida and Louisiana drug task forces had made in December 1984. The Florida sentence meant no jail time for Seal in Louisiana, yet Seal was pleading guilty to buying 200 kilograms (440 lbs) of cocaine, already more serious than the Florida charges. Also, before the agreement was reached, the Louisiana task force investigation had been looking into Seal's involvement in smuggling thousands of kilograms of cocaine.

At Seal's sentencing hearing in January 1986, Judge Frank Polozola acknowledged that he was bound by the agreement, but informed Seal and his lawyer of his dissatisfaction with Seal's failure to receive jail time in Florida, forcing Polozola to sentence Seal to probation on much more serious charges in Louisiana. He warned Seal that he intended to set strict probation provisions and that if Seal violated these, the plea bargain could be revoked and Seal re-sentenced. Polozola took the occasion to say that people like Seal were "the lowest, most despicable people I can think of." In imposing sentence, Polozola further stipulated that Seal could not carry a gun or hire armed bodyguards as this would be possession or constructive possession of a firearm by a convicted felon. Seal's attorney, Lewis Unglesby, told Polozola his ruling amounted to a death sentence for his client. Seal told friends that the judge "made me a clay pigeon."

The probation conditions prohibited Seal from leaving Baton Rouge without written permission from Judge Polozola, who ordered Seal to spend every night at a halfway house from 6 pm to 6 am for the first six months of his probation. Seal was assigned to the Salvation Army's Community Treatment Center in Baton Rouge.

== Murder ==
=== Background ===
Seal was originally introduced to the Medellín cartel members as a pilot named Ellis McKenzie. Although the newspaper report and the arrest of their Miami distributors confirmed that their pilot was DEA, it was not until the cartel members received a copy of Seal's television documentary that they learned McKenzie was Seal. They put out a contract to kidnap or murder Seal.

Max Mermelstein, a high-level cartel distributor in Miami, later testified in court that he was shown the documentary a few days after it was broadcast and was told that the cartel wanted Seal either captured or killed: the price was $500,000 if Seal was killed, and $1,000,000 if he was captured alive. Mermelstein testified that he accepted the contract, believing that a refusal would mean death. He received a phone call from Fabio Ochoa and Escobar, who both thanked him for his help, and was given $100,000 for any costs he incurred. Before Mermelstein had located Seal, however, he was arrested by a federal task force in June 1985. He soon told the task force about the contract, and Seal was informed that the cartel was offering $500,000 for his death.

=== Killing ===
On the evening of February 19, 1986, Seal was shot to death in front of the Salvation Army Center, three weeks into his probation. When Seal drove into the center's parking lot and parked, a man got out of a car behind the center's donation drop boxes and opened fire with a suppressed MAC-10 submachine gun. Seal was hit six times and died almost instantly.

Six Colombians were arrested in connection with the murder. Three of them, Luis Carlos Quintero-Cruz, Miguel Vélez, and Bernardo Antonio Vásquez, were indicted on state charges for capital murder. A fourth man was indicted separately on lesser charges, and evidence of direct involvement was insufficient for two, who were released and deported.

In addition to the state charges against the killers, federal charges were filed against Fabio Ochoa, Pablo Escobar, and a third cartel member, Rafael Cardona Salazar, for conspiring to violate Seal's civil rights by murdering him.

=== Trial ===
Widespread publicity and the general public outcry caused a delay of several months before Seal's murder trial began. It proved impossible to impanel sufficient jurors in Baton Rouge, so the venue was moved to Lake Charles. The trial began in April 1987. The most important witnesses were Max Mermelstein and Luis Carlos Uribe-Munera.

Mermelstein, who had told the DEA of the murder contract after his arrest in 1985, testified that Ochoa, Escobar, and Cardona had asked him to take the contract and provided him with money and weapons to do the job. He had seen Cardona test-fire the murder weapon in Mermelstein's garage and bullets that matched the murder weapon were later extracted from the garage wall by FBI forensics. Mermelstein also knew the defendant Vélez. He testified that Vélez was present when he was given the contract and that Vélez later asked Mermelstein to turn the contract over to him.

Uribe-Munera was a Colombian drug smuggler for the cartel. He testified that in January 1986, he was ordered by Jorge Ochoa to kill Seal. When Uribe-Munera learned that he would probably be killed afterward, he refused. He was then shot five times by cartel gunmen, but survived and eventually sought asylum at the U.S. embassy in Bogota. Uribe-Munera was brought to the U.S., where he agreed to plead guilty to conspiracy to import and distribute cocaine.

There was also extensive eyewitness and forensic evidence against Quintero-Cruz, Vélez, and Vásquez. A witness identified Vélez as the driver of the vehicle in the halfway house parking lot. Another eyewitness saw Quintero-Cruz outside the car, handing the MAC-10 to the car driver through the window after the murder. All three men's fingerprints were found in the vehicle. Vasquez was identified as the purchaser of the halfway house vehicle by the car agency salesman and paid for hotel rooms and rental cars using his name. All three were found guilty and sentenced to life without parole.

In January 2023, Louisiana governor John Bel Edwards denied Vásquez's request for clemency.

== Personal life ==
Seal was married three times. His first marriage, to Barbara Dodson, lasted from 1963 to 1971. The second marriage, to Lynn Ross, lasted from 1971 to 1972. In 1973, he married Deborah DuBois. The marriage ended with his death in 1986. Seal had six children; two from his first wife, one from a relationship he had in between marriages, and three more with Deborah.

== Legacy ==
=== Controversies ===
==== Exposure of Nicaraguan undercover operation ====
In 1988, the House Judiciary Committee held a hearing that looked into how Seal's 1984 trip to Nicaragua was leaked to the press. Questioned about the identity of the source, DEA agent Ernst Jacobson replied, "I heard that the leak came from an aide in the White House". He stated that Iran–Contra figure Oliver North had attended two meetings about the sting operation and had the motivation to release the information. UPI reported: "By linking the Sandinistas with drug traffic ... aid to the rebels accused of human rights violations might seem more palatable".

Subcommittee chairman William J. Hughes strongly suggested that North was the source of the leak, but Representative Bill McCollum said, "...we don't know who leaked this. No one has been able to tell us". Citing testimony of DEA Administrator John C. Lawn, the report of the Kerry Committee released in December 1988 pinned the leak on North stating he "decided to play politics with the issue". In an interview with Frontline, North said he was told by his superiors on the National Security Council to brief Senator Paula Hawkins about the operation, but he denied leaking the report. Hawkins told Frontline that neither she nor her staff leaked the information after the briefing. Jacoby later denied that North was the source of his story and attributed it to a deceased staff member for Representative Dan Daniel.

==== Criticism of U.S. failure to protect Seal ====
Louisiana Attorney General William Guste wrote to United States Attorney General Edwin Meese criticizing the government's failure to protect Seal as a witness. At Guste's request, Meese launched an investigation to determine whether or not attorneys in Louisiana, Miami, and Washington had mishandled the case, and to determine whether or not Seal should have been forced into protective custody. Government attorneys stated that Seal placed himself in danger by refusing to move his family and enter a witness protection program.

==== Alleged CIA ties ====
Some accounts like that of Alexander Cockburn suggested that Barry Seal's connections with the CIA might date back to the 1960s when he was allegedly a special forces helicopter pilot in Vietnam or even to the failed Bay of Pigs Invasion of 1961. Seal was reportedly involved in CIA-sponsored activities in Central America during the 1980s. This included transporting weapons to the Contra rebels in Nicaragua, who were fighting against the Nicaraguan government and smuggling drugs. Seal's connections to the CIA are controversial. The CIA denied having employed Seal and he denied ever having been a CIA asset.

=== Media depictions ===
==== Films ====
- Seal is portrayed by Dennis Hopper in Doublecrossed (1991), a docudrama made for HBO.
- Seal is portrayed by Michael Paré in the American crime drama film The Infiltrator (2016), in two brief, historically inaccurate scenes that exercise dramatic license to depict the film's title character, Robert Mazur, as a passenger in a car being driven by Seal who is killed in a motorcycle drive-by shooting.
- Seal is portrayed by Tom Cruise in the action-comedy film American Made (2017), loosely based on Seal's life, produced by Imagine Entertainment. Little of the film is historically accurate; most of the plot, such as the murder of Seal's brother-in-law, was invented for purposes of the film.

==== Television ====
- Seal is portrayed by the actor Sebastián Sánchez in Pablo Escobar, The Drug Lord as the character of Harry Beal.

== See also ==
- Allegations of CIA drug trafficking
- Kerry Committee report
- Killing of Don Henry and Kevin Ives
