= Rafa Salazar =

Colombian drug dealer (1950s–1987)

Rafael Cardona Salazar
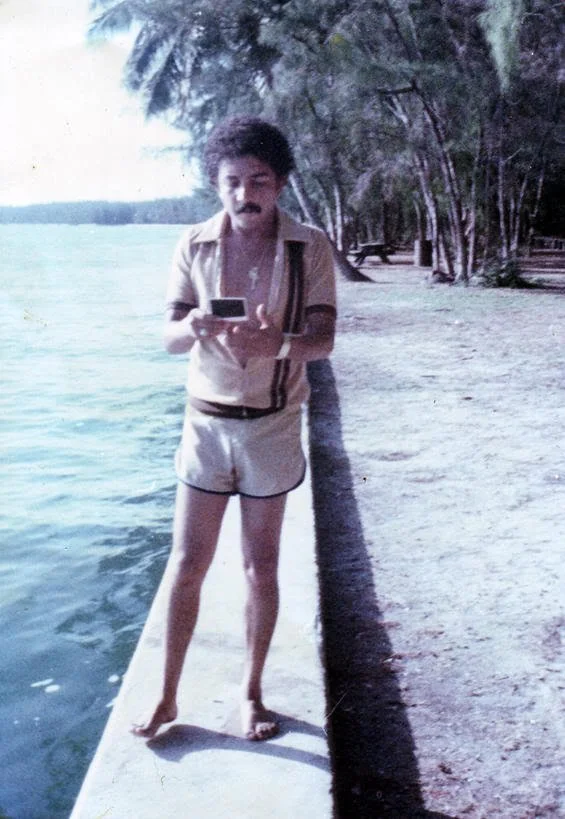
- Rafael “Rafico” Cardona Salazar at Max Mermelstein’s estate in Miami Lakes
- Born: Early 1950s Barrio Belén, Medellín, Colombia
- Died: December 4, 1987; Envigado, Medellín, Colombia
- Cause of death: Murdered by gunmen
- Citizenship: Colombia
- Occupation: Drug dealer
- Years active: 1978—1987
- Employer(s): Medellín Cartel, Cali Cartel
- Spouse: Odila
- Children: 2 (Carolina, Rafael Jr.)

Rafael Cardona Salazar (early 1950s–December 4, 1987), also known as Rafa Salazar, was a Colombian drug dealer who shipped cocaine into the United States through Miami from 1978 to 1987. Miami police claimed in 1987 that he was responsible for 80% of the cocaine being shipped into the country. Salazar first worked with the Colombian Medellín Cartel, allegedly heading their operations in the U.S., and then at some point switched allegiance to the Colombian Cali Cartel. In 1986, Salazar was indicted by a U.S. federal grand jury for conspiracy resulting in the murder of Barry Seal—a former Medellín dealer turned informant to U.S. law enforcement—earlier that year. Salazar was murdered by unidentified gunmen in Medellín in 1987, which escalated a war between the Medellín and Cali cartels.

== Childhood ==
Salazar was born in Barrio Belén, Medellín, Colombia, sometime during the early 1950s. His mother was Soledad Cardona and his father was Rafael Antonio Cardona. During a trip with Salazar through his hometown, partner and fellow cocaine trafficker Max Mermelstein noted that Salazar was raised in extreme poverty, and, after becoming rich as a result of the cocaine trade, he was later worshipped as a "god" in Belén for being able to rise out of it.

== Personal life ==
Salazar was married to Odila, with whom he had two children; daughter Carolina, and son Rafael, Jr. He also had many mistresses while married, including Maria Monzano (a Cali cocaine queen), Stela Henao, and Marta Ochoa Saldarriaga (first cousin to the Ochoa brothers Jorge Ochoa, Fabio Ochoa, and Juan David Ochoa). Saldarriaga was not the same person as Martha Nieves Ochoa Vásquez, sister of the Ochoa brothers who was kidnapped on March 13, 1981, by M-19. Salazar was known to be physically abusive to Odila, but he considered Saldarriaga to be his true love.

Salazar was known to be high via freebasing much of the time on "bazookas", from a mixture of cocaine paste and tobacco.

Salazar's birth date appears to be unclear; Mermelstein wrote that as of February 9, 1984, he was 34 years of age. This date was important because this was when Salazar was invited to sit on the cartel council.

== Career ==
Salazar was first associated with the Medellín Cartel operating out of Medellín, Colombia. He shipped cocaine from the cartel into the United States through Miami. According to Miami police, Salazar was responsible for around 80% of cocaine being shipped into the U.S. He allegedly headed the cartel's operations in the U.S. Law enforcement said he started shipments in 1978. He was an aide to Jorge Luis Ochoa Vásquez and his brother Fabio Ochoa Vásquez, both of them top Medellín leaders. Starting in 1981, Max Mermelstein worked for Salazar. Mermelstein "was responsible for working out the logistics of drug shipments to the United States, arranging flights, locating drop points, [and] scheduling deliveries." Salazar's rival in Miami was dealer Griselda Blanco, until she was arrested in California in 1985 and extradited back to Colombia.

According to Mermelstein, the real reason Blanco fled to California in 1984 was because she was really fleeing Salazar. Blanco had earlier ordered the killing of Saldarriaga because the former owed the latter $1.8 million in payment for cocaine, as Salazar had previously cut Blanco off of his supply due to her reputation of not paying her debts and killing her creditors. Because Salazar loved Saldarriaga, he was consumed with anger upon hearing the news and ordered all his shooters in New York, Miami and Colombia to kill on sight all of Blanco's shooters. Furthermore, he offered a reward to anyone who brought Blanco to him, dead or alive. Due to Salazar's rising status and power in the cartel, she fled with her children to California.

On February 9, 1984, Salazar was invited to sit on the cartel council.

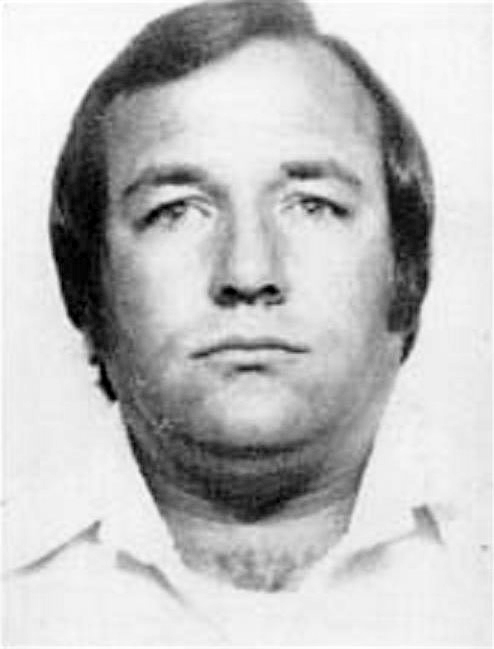
Barry Seal

On February 22, 1986, Barry Seal, a former Medellín dealer living in witness protection in Louisiana, was fatally shot by an unknown person before he was supposed to testify against Pablo Escobar, the leader of the Medellín Cartel, and Jorge Ochoa—the latter of whom was detained in Spain. On July 22, 1986, a U.S. federal grand jury indicted Escobar, Fabio Ochoa Vásquez, and Salazar for conspiracy to murder Seal, after Seal was found by the cartel to be an informant during a December 1984 meeting in Colombia. The trial began in Louisiana in January 1987, while all three men were at large. In the indictment, Salazar was alleged to have furnished the money to buy the gun used to shoot Seal, as well to locate Seal in Louisiana. Salazar allegedly test-fired the gun when it was bought in Florida.

Salazar was also indicited by a federal grand jury in 1986 for allegedly importing 58 tons of cocaine into the U.S. between 1978 and 1986. Around the time of this indictment, law enforcement seized two homes in Miami Lakes and Hollywood, Florida, which were allegedly owned by Salazar and used to "reconstruct" cocaine that had been damaged by water when they were airdropped off the coast of south Florida. In 1985, Max Mermelstein was arrested by U.S. authorities. He later turned state's evidence, testifying against Salazar. After the testimony, Salazar received new indictments in 1987, before Salazar's death. At some point, Salazar switched allegiance to the Colombian Cali Cartel. The two cartels were at war with each other in New York and Miami, and dozens of people on both sides were killed around this time.

== Murder ==
Salazar and his secretary, Luz Estela “Stella” or “Estelita” Ospina, were fatally shot by unknown gunmen at Salazar's antique car dealership, Autos Clásicos Las Vegas, in Medellin, Colombia on December 4, 1987. Police said the shooting might have been related to the city's drug dealing rivalries. Salazar was 35. The murder led to an escalation of the Medellín—Cali war; in February 1988, a building occupied and owned by Pablo Escobar was bombed. He and his family escaped the destruction without injury. The war then fully started later in 1988.

Mermelstein wrote that Salazar had a lot of enemies, including but not limited to Pablo Correa (the cartel's chief finance officer who humiliated Salazar in front of cartel leaders over a lost shipment worth millions of dollars) and his own wife Odila, who blamed Salazar for causing their daughter's blindness by forcing her to stay with him during one of his freebasing scourges where the coke smoke affected her eyes, in addition to abusing her. Furthermore, Mermelstein stated that Odila had quite a bit of money, that she skimmed $2-3 million per year off Salazar, and could hire the best assassins in Colombia if she wanted. Another possible reason he states for the hit was because Salazar "guaranteed" Mermelstein to the Ochoas in the beginning; so when Mermelstein turned government witness against the cartel, that quite possibly could have sealed Salazar's fate. After reaching out to his Colombian contacts upon learning of Salazar's and Ospina's murders, Mermelstein wrote that DAS officers were who actually killed them but its unknown whether they were hired or acted alone.

== In popular culture ==
Salazar was portrayed by Camilo Jiménez Varón in the 2024 Netflix biopic miniseries Griselda, about Griselda Blanco. The show incorrectly states that Blanco fled to California to avoid revenge from Salazar, whose girlfriend died while she and Blanco were doing cocaine; Blanco was worried Salazar might have thought his girlfriend was murdered. Blanco, in California, learns that Salazar is in the state and calls the police on herself to avoid Salazar's punishment. In reality, law enforcement had tracked Blanco to California after she moved there in 1984, surveilled her, and arrested her during a raid on her California home in 1985. After the show's release, Salazar's family criticized its portrayal of him, and sued the show's producers for portraying Salazar without their permission in May 2024.
