= Griselda Blanco =

Colombian drug lord (1943–2012)

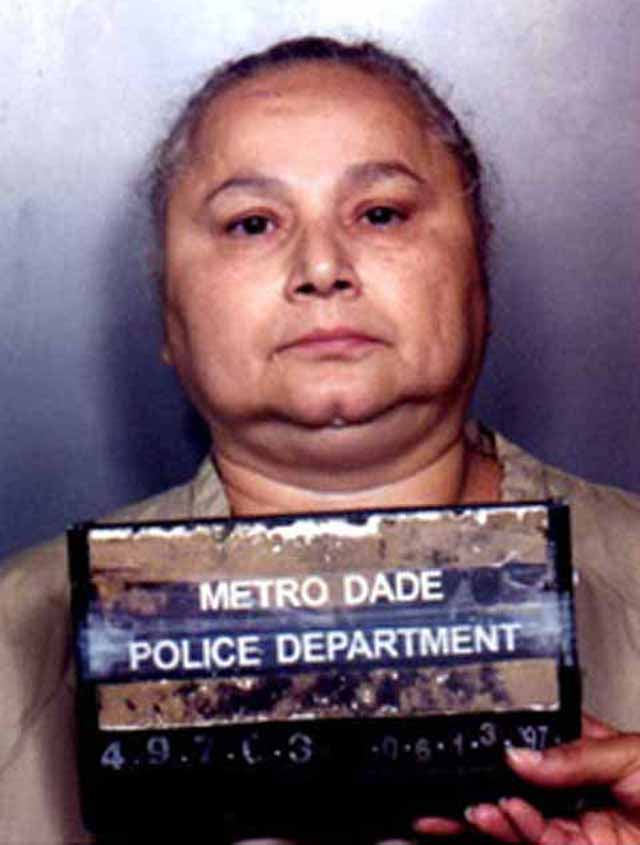
- Mugshot of Blanco in 1997
- Born: Griselda Blanco Restrepo; February 15, 1943; Cartagena, Colombia
- Died: September 3, 2012 (aged 69); Medellín, Antioquia, Colombia
- Cause of death: Gunshot wounds
- Other names: La Dama de la Mafia ('The Lady of the Mafia'); The Godmother; The Black Widow
- Spouses: Carlos Trujillo; Alberto Bravo; Darío Sepúlveda
- Children: Dixon Trujillo Blanco; Uber Trujillo Blanco; Osvaldo Trujillo Blanco; Michael Corleone Blanco
- Convictions: Federal: Conspiracy to manufacture, import into the United States, and distribute cocaine (21 U.S.C. §§ 841 and 963); Florida: Second degree murder (3 counts)
- Penalty: Federal: 15 years' imprisonment; Florida: 20 years' imprisonment

Griselda Blanco Restrepo (February 14, 1943 – September 3, 2012) was a Colombian drug lord who was prominent in the cocaine-based drug trade and underworld of Miami, during the 1970s through the early 2000s, and who has also been claimed by some to have been part of the Medellín Cartel. She was shot dead in Medellín on September 3, 2012, at the age of 69.

== Early life ==
Griselda Blanco Restrepo was born in Cartagena, Colombia, on the country's north coast. She and her mother, Ana Restrepo, moved south to Medellín when she was three years old; this exposed her to a criminal lifestyle at an impressionable age, as Medellín was enduring years of its own socioeconomic and political troubles. Blanco's former lover, Charles Cosby, recounted that, at the age of 11, she allegedly kidnapped, attempted to ransom, and ultimately shot a child from an upscale neighborhood near her home. Blanco had become a pickpocket before she was a teenager. To escape the sexual abuse of her mother's boyfriend, she ran away from home at the age of 19, thieving in the city center until the age of 20. It is speculated that she may have engaged in prostitution to better support herself financially during this time.

== Drug business ==
Blanco was a key figure in the establishment of the cocaine trade between Colombia and large North American cities like Miami and New York, as well as to dealers in California. Her distribution network, which spanned across the United States and Colombia, earned $80 million per month.

Blanco and her first husband, Carlos Trujillo, first started a marijuana-dealing enterprise in Colombia. In 1964, after divorcing Trujillo, Blanco illegally entered the United States with fake documentation, under an assumed name; she would end up settling in Queens, New York, with her three children and second husband, Alberto Bravo, a cocaine smuggler for the Medellín Cartel. They set up a thriving drug operation in New York City. However, nine years later in April 1975, Blanco was identified by authorities and indicted on federal drug conspiracy charges, along with thirty of her subordinates. The family fled to Colombia to avoid conviction. She returned to the United States in the latter half of the 1970s to start a new drug operation in Miami.

Her return coincided with the beginning of numerous violent public conflicts—notably, hundreds of homicides per year—that plagued the Metro Miami area during the 1980s, a time known as the Miami drug war. This was a period when cocaine was extremely lucrative, and trafficked more than cannabis. The struggle by law enforcement to end the influx of cocaine into Miami led to the creation of CENTAC 26 (Central Tactical Unit), a joint operation between the Miami-Dade Police Department and the Drug Enforcement Administration (DEA) antidrug operation.

== Arrest ==
On February 17, 1985, Blanco was arrested in her home by DEA agents and subsequently charged with conspiring to manufacture, import, and distribute cocaine. The case went to trial in federal court in New York City, where she was found guilty and sentenced to 15 years in prison.

While serving her sentence, she was charged with three counts of first-degree murder by the state of Florida. The prosecution made a deal with one of Blanco's most trusted hitmen, Jorge Ayala, who agreed to testify that Blanco had ordered him to carry out the killings; however, the case collapsed due to technicalities relating to a phone sex scandal between Ayala and two secretaries employed at the state attorney's office. In 1998, Blanco pled guilty to three counts of second-degree murder and was sentenced to 20 years in prison, to run concurrently.

In 2004, Blanco was released from prison in the United States after serving her full sentence and was deported back to Colombia.

== Personal life ==
Blanco had three husbands and four children. She met her first husband Carlos Trujillo when she was 13 years old. She and Trujillo had three sons together in Medellín: Dixon, Uber, and Osvaldo. All three were born by the time Blanco was 26. Blanco and Trujillo divorced but remained business partners. After an argument over a business deal that went awry, Blanco had Trujillo executed.

Following her marriage to Trujillo, Blanco married Alberto Bravo. After returning to Colombia, Blanco accused Bravo of stealing millions of dollars from the enterprise, and Bravo accused Blanco of letting her "Godmother" nickname go to her head. Blanco murdered Bravo by shooting him in the head.

Blanco had her youngest son, Michael Corleone Blanco (named after the character Michael Corleone from The Godfather film series) with her third husband, Darío Sepúlveda. Sepúlveda left her in 1983, returned to Colombia, and kidnapped Michael when he and Blanco disagreed over who would have custody. Blanco paid to have Sepúlveda assassinated in Colombia, and her son returned to her in the US.

According to the Miami New Times, "Michael's father and older siblings were all killed before he reached adulthood. His mother was in prison for most of his childhood and teenage years, and he was raised by his paternal grandmother and legal guardians." In 2012, Michael was put under house arrest after a sentencing on two felony counts of cocaine trafficking and conspiracy to traffic in cocaine. Michael's probation ended in 2018. He appeared on a 2018 episode of the Investigation Discovery documentary series Evil Lives Here to recount his lonely childhood. In 2019, he was featured on the VH1 docuseries Cartel Crew, which follows the descendants of drug lords. He also runs a clothing brand, Pure Blanco.

According to Michael, his mother became a born-again Christian in her later years.

== Death ==
On September 3, 2012, Blanco and her pregnant daughter-in-law went to the Cardiso butcher shop on the corner of 29th Street in Medellín. As she exited, an assassin on a motorcycle shot her twice in the head, killing her. The act mimicked the assassination style that Blanco practiced during the Miami drug war.

== In popular culture ==
Blanco has been featured in multiple documentaries, series, films, and songs, including several upcoming projects.

- Blanco features prominently in the documentary films Cocaine Cowboys (2006) and Cocaine Cowboys 2 (2008; also written as Cocaine Cowboys II: Hustlin' With the Godmother).
- In 2010, Florida rapper Jacki-O released a mixtape titled La Madrina - Griselda Blanco.
- In 2011, rapper Lil Kim referenced Blanco in her "Warning Freestyle"; in 2016, she referenced Blanco again, in the song "Diego", on the record Lil Kim Season.
- She was portrayed by Colombian actress Luces Velásquez in the 2012 television series Pablo Escobar, The Drug Lord (as the character of Graciela Rojas).
- In 2012, American rapper Westside Gunn formed a record label called Griselda Records, named directly after Blanco.
- In the 2012 Meek Mill song "Believe It", Rick Ross states, "Rest in peace, Griselda Blanco."
- In 2013, American rapper Pusha T mentions Blanco in the song "Pain" from his studio album My Name Is My Name.
- La viuda negra (The Black Widow) was a 2014 Spanish-language telenovela produced by RTI Producciones and Televisa for United States-based television network Univisión and for Colombia-based television network Caracol Televisión. It is an adaptation of the book La patrona de Pablo Escobar of José Guarnizo, based on the story of Griselda Blanco; Blanco is portrayed by Ana Serradilla.
- "Griselda Blanco" appears in Marlon James' Booker Prize-winning novel A Brief History of Seven Killings (2014).
- Korean-Canadian rapper Paul Blanco created his stage name after her, following the Chicago drill rappers' trend of having drug lord stage names.
- In an early leaked version of Kanye West's 2016 song, "Famous", fellow rapper Young Thug mentions Blanco.
- In the 2017 song Portland (song) by Drake fellow rapper Quavo references Blanco in his lyrics.
- In Nicki Minaj's verse in Fetty Wap's 2016 single "Like a Star", Minaj references Blanco in her closing lines.
- In the television film Cocaine Godmother (2018) on Lifetime, Blanco was played by Catherine Zeta-Jones.
- "Griselda Blanco", a song by Toronto drill rappers Pengz and Two Two, was certified Platinum in Canada.
- In 2018, French rappers Booba and Maes composed a song, "Madrina", referring to Blanco.
- YoungBoy Never Broke Again's 2018 song "Slime Belief" references Griselda multiple times in the chorus.
- In Nicki Minaj's unofficial 2019 remix of DaBaby's "Suge", Minaj references Blanco in her opening line.
- In Nicki Minaj's verse in Chance the Rapper's 2019 song, "Slide Around", Minaj references Griselda Blanco and Pablo Escobar.
- Blanco is portrayed by Sofía Vergara in the six-part Netflix miniseries Griselda (2024).

== See also ==
- Enedina Arellano Félix, another female drug trafficker
- List of people deported or removed from the United States

== Sources ==
- Smitten, Richard (November 1, 1990). The Godmother: the true story of the hunt for the most bloodthirsty female criminal of our time. Pocket Books. ISBN 978-0-671-70193-2. Archived from the original on February 7, 2009.
- Pablo Escobar and Colombian Narcoculture by Aldona Bialowas Pobutsky
