= Evan Rosenfeld =

American film producer

Evan Rosenfeld is a film and television producer born in Miami, Florida.

Evan is currently the Showrunner, Director and Executive Producer of Warriors of Liberty City, a 6 episode documentary series he created premiering on Starz September 16, 2018. LeBron James and Maverick Carter also serve as Executive Producers through their SpringHill Entertainment production company.

Warriors of Liberty City follows a youth football program co-founded by rapper Luther Campbell (Uncle Luke) in Miami's Liberty City neighborhood. The neighborhood is synonymous with poverty and gun violence, but is also known for producing the most, and the best, NFL players in the country (Antonio Brown, Devonta Freeman, Chad Johnson, Duke Johnson, TY Hilton, Amari Cooper, Teddy Bridgewater)

The series had its world premiere at the 2018 South by Southwest Film Festival (SXSW) as the first ever documentary series to premiere at the festival.

Previous to Warriors, Evan was the Showrunner and Executive Producer of VICE World of Sports, a sports documentary series currently in its second season on VICE Media’s cable television network VICELAND. The series premiered at the 2016 Tribeca Film Festival.

VICE World of Sports, which won “Outstanding Sports Program" at the Producers Guild of America Awards 2016, is Evan's first series in the Showrunner position. The show was also nominated for a "Best Sports Documentary" Emmy at the 2018 Sports Emmy Awards.

Before VICE, Evan got his start at Miami based documentary studio Rakontur and then moved on to Mandalay Sports Media, a sports entertainment company owned by filmmaker Mike Tollin and Peter Guber.

He started his work in film on the 2006 cult-classic documentary Cocaine Cowboys (Magnolia Pictures) and was an associate producer on the sequel, Cocaine Cowboys 2 (Magnolia Pictures / 2008).

Evan was nominated for a Sports Emmy Award for his work on The U, a 2009 ESPN Films "30 for 30" project that premiered to record breaking ratings.

In October 2012, Broke, a documentary Evan produced, premiered on ESPN to kickoff their second "30 for 30" season. Broke looks at the intersection of money and sports in the last 20 years, and the recent epidemic of big stars losing it all. Broke premiered to 2.53 million viewers, becoming the highest rated film in the "30 for 30" series, besting a previous record set by The U.

Also in 2012, Evan was the Executive Producer of the Sundance Film Festival selected short film Life and Freaky Times of Uncle Luke starring Luther "Uncle Luke" Campbell. The film received 5 (of 5) stars from Film Threat and was one of Indiewire's 10 must see short films from this year's festival. In 2014 it was named one of the "Twenty-five must-see short films from over a century of cinema."

In 2013, Evan was the senior producer of an NBA and CBS documentary Summer Dreams, a two-hour special that follows the players, personalities and behind-the-scenes drama at the NBA Summer League. The special premiered on March 15 on CBS in prime time.

In 2015, Evan produced "Kareem: Minority of One," an HBO documentary about basketball great Kareem Abdul-Jabbar.

Evan is also producing and directing a feature-length documentary that chronicles the introduction of American football to South Asia and the start of the first professional league, the EFLI. The Elite Football League of India (EFLI) is the first professional American football league in India, Pakistan and Sri Lanka. Founded in late 2011, the EFLI was started to create new opportunities for athletes in the region. The league consists of eight teams, five located in various cities across India, two in Sri Lanka, and one from Pakistan.

His other projects include Dawg Fight, a brutal exposé on underground backyard MMA fighting in one of Miami's toughest neighborhoods, which was released in 2015 on Netflix.

Maxim Magazine profiled Dawg Fight in a 6-page feature.
