= Cocaine Cowboys =

Cocaine Cowboys may refer to:

== Film ==
- Cocaine Cowboys (1979 film), a crime drama directed by Ulli Lommel
- Cocaine Cowboys (2006 film), a documentary
- Cocaine Cowboys 2, a 2008 sequel to the 2006 film
- Cocaine Cowboys: The Kings of Miami, a 2021 crime docuseries

== Music ==
- "Cocaine Cowboys", a 1999 song by W.A.S.P. from the album Helldorado
- "Cocaine Cowboys", a 2012 song by Crashdïet from the album The Savage Playground
- "Cocaine Cowboys", a 2017 song by Margo Price from the album All American Made

== See also ==
- Miami drug war
