= List of slang names for cannabis =

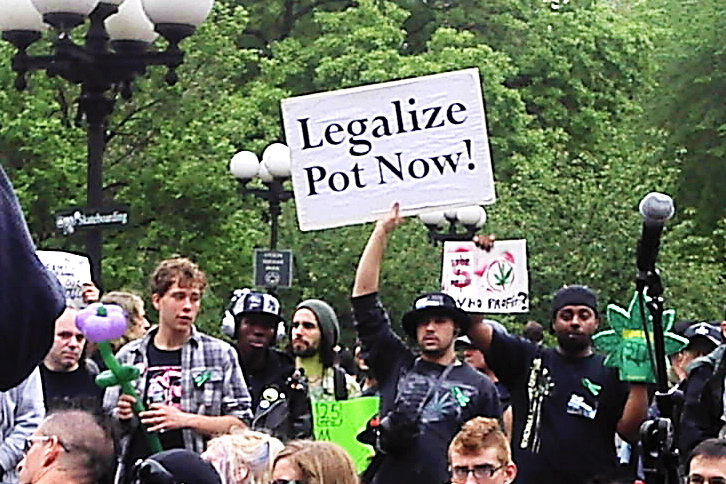
Pot, a common slang name for cannabis, on a sign at a 2012 cannabis rights demonstration in New York City

More than 1,200 slang names have been identified for the product (drug), herb or hashish, obtained from the cannabis plant. This list is not exhaustive; it includes well-attested expressions.

== Slang names by continent and country ==
=== African slang names ===
==== Nigeria ====
- Abana
- Blau
- Gbana
- Igbo
- Kaya
- Kpoli
- Kush
- Oja
- Wee-wee

=== North American slang names ===
==== United States ====
In the United States, most slang names for marijuana and hashish date to the jazz era, when it was called gauge, jive, reefer. Weed is a commonly used slang term for drug cannabis. New slang names, like trees, came into use early in the twenty-first century.

- 2 long
- Ace
- Airplane
- Alfalfa
- Alligator cigarette
- Amnesia
- Asparagus
- Astro turf
- Aunt Mary
- Baby
- Bag of bones
- Bhang
- Blunt
- Bobo
- Boof
- Broccoli
- Bud
- Cabbage
- Cali-weed
- Cannon
- Catnip
- Christmas tree
- Chronic
- Climb
- Collie
- Dagga
- Da kine
- Dak
- Dank
- Devil's lettuce
- Doña Juanita ("Lady Jane" in Spanish)
- Doobie
- Dope
- Endo
- Exotic
- Fatty
- Fir
- Fire
- Flower
- Ganja
- Gas
- Good giggles
- Grass
- Green
- Green goddess
- Griffa
- Grifo
- Hashish
- Herb
- Holy weed
- Houdini
- Jazz cigarette
- Jazz cabbage
- Joint
- KGB ("killer green bud")
- Kush
- L pape
- Left-handed cigarette
- Loud
- Magic Grass
- Magic dragon
- Magical brownie
- Mary Jane
- Maui-wowie
- Mota
- Muggle
- Nixon
- Ouid
- Pakalolo (Hawaiian for "crazy tobacco")
- Pinner
- Pot
- Polen
- Puff
- Purple Haze
- Rainy day woman
- Reefer
- Roach
- Rudolf Red Eyes
- Sinsemilla
- Skunk
- Spliff
- Square grouper
- Stash
- Sticky icky
- Stogie
- Tea
- Thirteen
- Trees
- Wacky baccy
- Wacky tobacky (sometimes spelled "wacky tobaccy")
- Weed
- Wisdom weed
- Yart
- Zaza (sometimes shortened as "Za")

==== Slang names for cannabis identified by the United States Drug Enforcement Administration ====
Whether all of these terms are slang names, or just some, is disputed by some scholars, including writers at The Boston Globe and Reason Magazine. Slang names for cannabis that were identified by the Drug Enforcement Administration in 2017–2018 and are not corroborated by another source include:

- Alfombra
- All-Star
- Almohada
- Arizona ashes
- AZ
- Barbara Jean
- Bareta
- Bash
- Biggy
- Black Maria
- Blue Crush
- Blue jeans
- Chistosa
- Cotorritos
- Dizz
- Escoba
- Gallina
- Gato
- Green paint
- Grenuda
- Guardada
- Lechuga
- Lemon-Lime
- Liamba
- Lime Pillows
- Mafafa
- Manteca
- Maracachafa
- Mariquita
- My Brother
- Narizona
- O-Boy
- Palm
- Platinum Jack
- Popcorn
- Shoes
- Shmagma
- Shora
- Shrimp
- Smoochy Woochy Poochy
- Tigitty
- Tila
- Tims
- Tosca
- Tristan kush
- Tweeds
- Valle
- Wooz
- Young Girls
- Zacate

=== Latin American slang names ===
==== Mexico ====
- Marihuana or Marijuana (originally Mariguana; derivatives: maría, mariana, mari juana, marinola, maripepa, etc.)
- Zacate
- Cucaracha
- Juanita
- Doña juana
- Mota

==== Latin America ====
- 420
- Césped
- Ganja
- Hierba (o yerba o yerbasanta)
- Joint
- Orégano
- Pasto
- Mafafa
- Mostaza
- Shora
- Kan-jac (Panama)

=== Asian slang names ===
==== Indonesia ====
- Daun singkong (Indonesian for "cassava leaf")
- Cimeng
- Gele

=== European slang names ===
==== France ====
- Beuh
- Chichon
- Ganja
- Herbe
- Kif
- Marie-Jeanne
- Shit
- Taga
- Teush
- Washmeuh
- Weed

==== Spain ====
- Grifa
- Chocolate

==== Sweden ====
- Flower/fruit
  - Grälle
  - Gräs
  - Gröning
  - Grönt
  - Marre
  - Maja
  - Ört
- Hash
  - Böj
  - Braj
  - Brass
  - Brownie
  - Brunt
  - Knatch, knätch
  - Svart
  - Zattla
  - Zütt

== Slang names for cannabis by quality ==
=== Good-quality cannabis ===
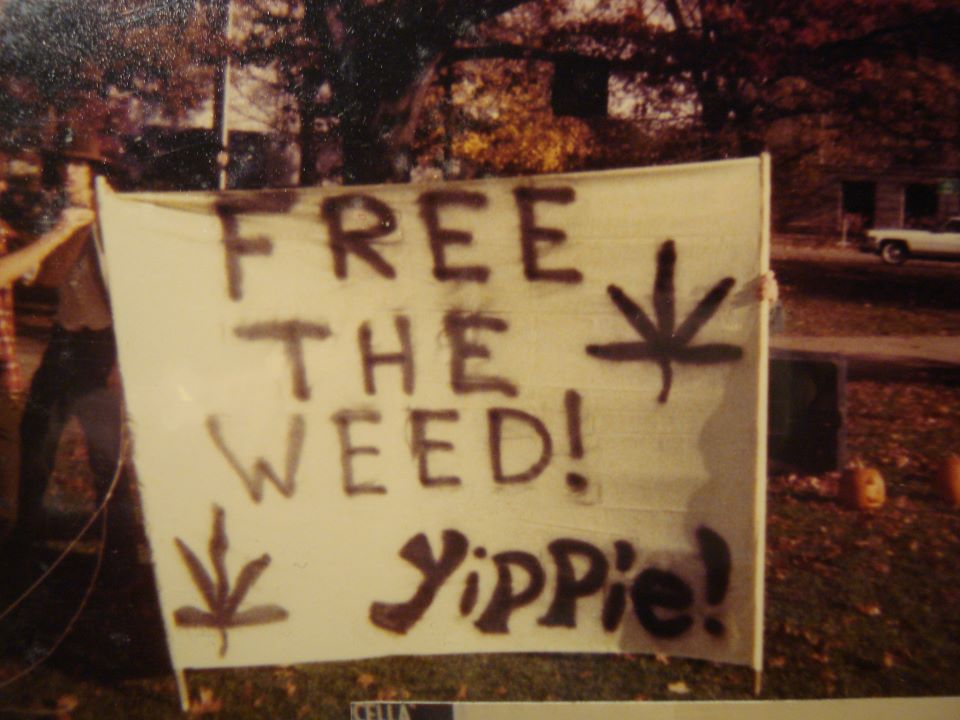
Weed, a commonly used slang name for cannabis, written on a banner at a Yippie smoke-in in Ohio in 1978

- Chronic
- Dank
- Ganja
- Gas
- Hydro
- Koota
- Loud
- Nug
- Sinsemilla

=== Poor-quality cannabis ===
- Brickweed
- Cabbage
- Ditch weed
- Nixon
- Schwag
- Shake
- Oregano

== Slang names for specific products ==
=== Cannabis cigarettes ===
- 2 long
- Airplane
- Alligator cigarette
- Bifter, bifta
- Bomber
- Bone
- Camberwell carrot
- Cow
- Cripple
- Doink
- Doobie
- Fatty
- Jazz cigarette
- Joint
- L pape
- Left-handed cigarette
- Magic dragon
- Number
- Phatty
- Pinner
- Reefer
- Roach
- Spliff
- Stogie
- Tommy Chong
- Yontson
- Zol

=== Package or a specific amount of cannabis ===
- 40 Sack
- Dime bag
- Dollar
- Dub
- Eight ball
- Eighth
- Elbow
- Lid
- Nickel bag
- OZ
- Q
- QP
- Quarter
- Stash
- Bow
- Zip

== Slang names for consuming cannabis ==
- 420
- Burning bush
- Getting high
- Hot box
- Session
- Toke
- Vape
- Wake and bake
- Garden

== Slang names for cannabis' effects ==
- Buzz
- Baked
- Cottonmouth
- Couch-lock
- Faded
- Fried
- High
- Lit up
- Mashed
- Munchies
- Nature's holiday
- Roasted
- Skaffa
- Stoned
- Toasted
- Tripping balls
- Wasted

== Slang names for a person who consumes cannabis ==
- Burnout
- Connoisseur
- Ent
- Gardener
- Hippie
- Pothead
- Stoner
- Tea head
- Viper
- Beekeeper

== See also ==
- Cant (language)
- Glossary of cannabis terms
- List of names for cannabis
- List of names for cannabis strains
