= Tom Cruise Purple =

Cannabis strain

- Genus: Cannabis
- Species: Cannabis indica dominant hybrid
- Hybrid parentage: Purple Kush; Cotton Candy; Purple Cotton
- Origin: California

Tom Cruise Purple is a strain of cannabis sold in California by select licensed cannabis clubs. The strain is potent, and is packaged with a picture of the actor Tom Cruise laughing. Cruise sought out legal advice regarding the product, and considered a lawsuit against its manufacturers.

Media commentators for Gawker, Daily News (New York) and the CNN program Showbiz Tonight analyzed the matter, and the product was the subject of a parody on a satirical website. American lawyer Lisa Bloom commented that it would not be prudent for Cruise to sue over the product, and public relations writer Howard Bragman stated it was not a good idea from a legal standpoint to utilize Cruise's image in such a fashion.

== Cannabis strain ==
The strain is very potent, and is reported to have hallucinogenic properties. The marijuana is being sold in vials which have a picture of American actor Tom Cruise laughing hysterically. Tom Cruise Purple is sold by cannabis purveyors in Northern California, and is a popular choice among vaporizer users. The strain is sold legally in California, as a medical cannabis product.

== Commentary ==
Marlene Arpe wrote in The Toronto Star, "A strain of weed called Tom Cruise Purple is being sold at California cannabis clubs. It makes you laugh hysterically while maintaining iron-fisted control of everyone around you." Ryan Tate of Gawker commented, "How high do you have to be to name a grade of medical marijuana after lawsuit-happy Scientologist Tom Cruise?" CNN television host A.J. Hammer commented on the program Showbiz Tonight, "Also, you can now roll up Tom Cruise and smoke him. That's right. Marijuana is being sold called 'Tom Cruise Purple.' But you know, Tom's not laughing to be blunt. Will there be a joint investigation or is this just a token effort - you know, a half-baked idea?"

American lawyer Lisa Bloom said of the possibility that Cruise's attorneys might sue over the marijuana product, "You know, if his lawyers sue over this, I'm going to wonder what they've been smoking. Nobody really thinks that Tom Cruise is endorsing this particular kind of marijuana. Why don't celebrities occasionally just laugh - just laugh at things? This is obviously supposed to be a joke. There's a picture of him laughing on it. He's clearly not making any money off of it. He's not endorsing it. I say, just let it go." Miami editor of In Touch Weekly, Michael Cohen, stated "...it's well-known in the industry you don't mess with Tom Cruise. And so, that's all I can say. I'm sure his lawyers are on this like white on rice. But I'm sure he's actually not as affected by it as his lawyers are." Public relations writer Howard Bragman commented, "I can tell you Tom and his lawyers do not have a sense of humor. And messing with Tom Cruise's image is risky business, OK?"

== Legal response ==
Representatives for Cruise were notified of the existence of the product by journalists for the New York Daily News. Cruise has sought legal advice about what action should be taken regarding the name. He has considered filing a lawsuit against the manufacturers of the product. As a follower of Scientology, Cruise is opposed to the use of psychotropic drugs. He was reported to be furious over the existence of the product. A friend of Cruise found the matter "outrageous". Lawyers for Cruise commented to CNN, "We haven't seen the product, so we can't comment on whether or not it's true. Tom does not allow his name and likeness to be used to sell products. And as you can imagine, if he were to do an endorsement, this would hardly be his first choice."

== See also ==
- Drug subculture
- Medical marijuana
