= Alfred Spellman =

American film and television producer (born 1978)

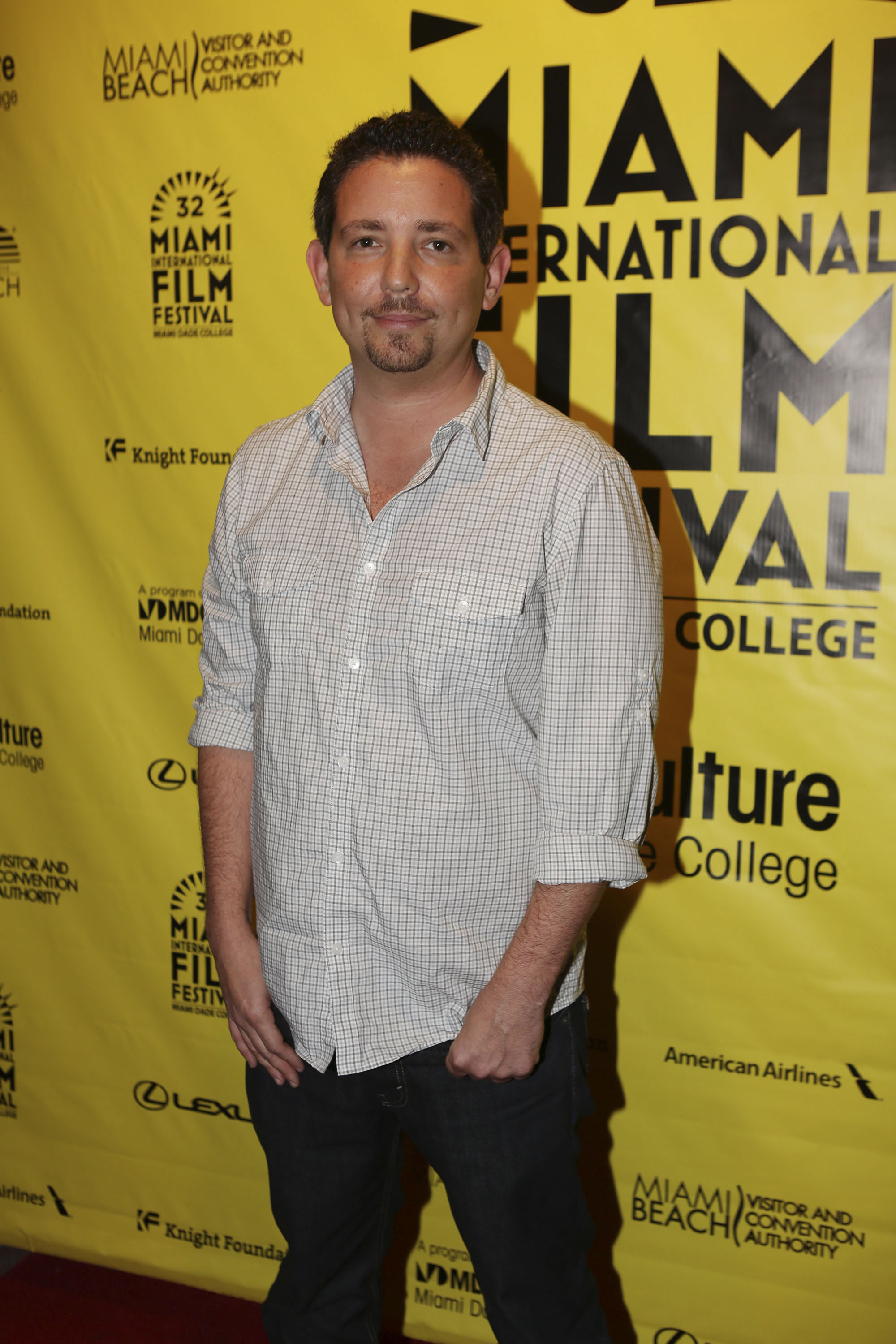
- Spellman in 2015
- Born: November 15, 1978 (age 47); Miami Beach, Florida, U.S.
- Occupation: Film/TV Producer
- Years active: 2000-present
- Known for: Cocaine Cowboys, The U, 537 Votes

Alfred Spellman is an American film and television producer who co-founded the media studio rakontur.

== Early life ==
Spellman was born in Miami Beach, Florida on November 15, 1978. He graduated from North Miami Beach Senior High School.

== Filmography ==
- Raw Deal: A Question of Consent (2001)
- Cocaine Cowboys (2006)
- Cocaine Cowboys 2: Hustlin With The Godmother (2008)
- Clubland (2008)
- The U (2009)
- Square Grouper (2011)
- Limelight (2011)
- Broke (2012)
- Collision Course (2013)
- The Tanning of America: One Nation Under Hip Hop (2014)
- Cocaine Cowboys Reloaded (2014)
- The U Part 2 (2014)
- Dawg Fight (2015)
- Miami Beach 100 (2015)
- Magic City Hustle (2019)
- Screwball (2019)
- 537 Votes (2020)
- Macho Man (2021)
- Cocaine Cowboys: The Kings of Miami (2021)
- From Russia With Lev (2024)
- Men of War (2024)
