= Dada 5000 =

American MMA fighter

- Born: Dhafir Harris; August 4, 1977 (age 49); Cat Island, Bahamas
- Other names: Da Spartan
- Nationality: Bahamian; American
- Height: 6 ft 3 in (191 cm)
- Weight: 265 lb (120 kg; 18 st 13 lb)
- Division: Heavyweight (2010–2011, 2016)
- Reach: 77 in (200 cm)
- Fighting out of: Miami, Florida, United States
- Years active: 2010–2011, 2016 (MMA)

Mixed martial arts record
- Total: 3
- Wins: 2
- By knockout: 2
- Losses: 0
- No contests: 1

Other information
- Mixed martial arts record from Sherdog
- Last updated on: May 25, 2016

Dhafir Harris (born August 4, 1977), known as Dada 5000, is a Bahamian-American retired mixed martial artist and combat sports promoter. Turning professional in 2010, Harris went on to compete in the Heavyweight division of Bellator MMA in 2016.

He is a former internet celebrity known for no holds barred street fight videos. He was the subject of the 2015 documentary film Dawg Fight. Harris is also the co-founder of the bare-knuckle fighting promotion BYB Extreme.

== Mixed martial arts career ==
=== Early career ===
Harris began a career in the MMA at age 32, fighting in back to back local Florida state bouts, with two wins. Harris made his debut against Cedric James at the fourth event of the Action Fight League based in Florida. Harris won by KO at less than 3 minutes of the first round. There was controversy, as James, who was a ground styled fighter and who had Harris in a submission, Harris got his arm free and threw strikes. Soon the ref came in and broke the men up, returning the fight to stand up, and Harris would batter James with a flurry of blows.

Harris' next fight was against Tim Papp where he won by TKO in 50 seconds of the first round. In contrast to his first prior bout, Harris paced himself and focused on tactical attacks during this fight, even putting Papp into a guillotine choke, but released his opponent to go for a KO victory.

In late 2011 Harris announced he would be fighting childhood friend turned bitter rival Kimbo Slice in January 2012 for the WFO MMA promotion heavyweight championship in Las Vegas, Nevada, reported by several MMA and combat news sites. The fight never materialized however, and Harris would not compete in MMA for nearly another five years.

=== Bellator MMA ===
In 2016, Harris returned to mixed martial arts to make his Bellator MMA debut in the highly sought after, publicized match with Slice at Bellator 149. Midway through the first round both fighters would become fatigued, leading to a very uneventful fight. Harris was defeated by way of technical knock out during the waning moments of the third round.

Having collapsed at the end of the bout, Harris was removed from the ring on a stretcher and immediately rushed to the hospital. He was later determined to have suffered the results of cardiac arrest, severe dehydration and kidney failure during the contest with Slice. Following two weeks of hospitalization, Harris was released on March 2, 2016. Bellator President Scott Coker stated after the bout that Dada 5000 would not be invited back to fight in Bellator, and thus was not re-signed past his one-fight deal against Slice. In March 2016, it was revealed that Slice had tested positive for nandrolone and an elevated testosterone to epitestosterone ratio (T/E ratio) in a pre-fight drug test. The result of the fight was overturned to a no contest.

Slice soon died at age 42 some months after the bout, and Harris, despite their rivalry and remembering their one-time friendship, paid tribute to his fallen adversary on his Instagram page, citing him as somebody who "Showed the World that a guy from the Back yard circuit Can make it in Professional Sports and do the impossible".

=== Suspension and retirement ===
In May 2016, Harris stated his intention of not competing in MMA again for the immediate future due to his health concerns, but hoped to be back in action for combat sports when he was fully recovered. In addition, as a result of the events surrounding his fight with Slice and his health concern, Harris was suspended from MMA in the state of Texas indefinitely. Harris confirmed on August 16, 2021, in an interview with Jimmy Smith of Fight Nation that his fight with Slice was indeed his last and that he was retired from MMA. A return to combat sports was later ruled out for Harris as he was also barred from competing in a bare-knuckle boxing match in November 2022, as in addition to the Texas commission, the Florida commission made their decision based on the judgement of the Texas suspension.

== Promoting career ==
=== BYB Extreme Fighting Series ===
In April 2019, Harris started his own bare-knuckle fighting promotion in Miami, Florida. Serving as the promoter and face of the organization, BYB Extreme Fighting Series hosted its first event in April 2019; the event was notable for having the self-proclaimed smallest cage in combat sports. Known as the "trigon," the triangular cage debuted at the first event. BYB Extreme Fighting Series' next event "Brawl III: Brawl at the Rock," took place on March 7, 2020. The card was headlined by Chris Barnett taking on Matt Kovacs, with the co-main event being Mike Trujillo taking on Matt Delanoit.

== Mixed martial arts record ==
Professional record breakdown
3 matches	2 wins	0 losses
By knockout	2	0
No contests	1	

Res.	Record	Opponent	Method	Event	Date	Round	Time	Location	Notes
NC	2–0 (1)	Kimbo Slice	NC (overturned)	Bellator 149	February 19, 2016	3	1:32	Houston, Texas, United States	Originally a TKO win for Slice; overturned after Slice tested positive for nandrolone and an elevated T/E ratio.
Win	2–0	Tim Papp	TKO (punches)	MFA – New Generation 4	February 12, 2011	1	0:50	Miami, Florida, United States	
Win	1–0	Cedric James	KO (punches)	Action Fight League – Rock-N-Rumble 2	March 5, 2010	1	2:34	Hollywood, Florida, United States	
