= Kimbo Slice =

American mixed martial artist (1974–2016)

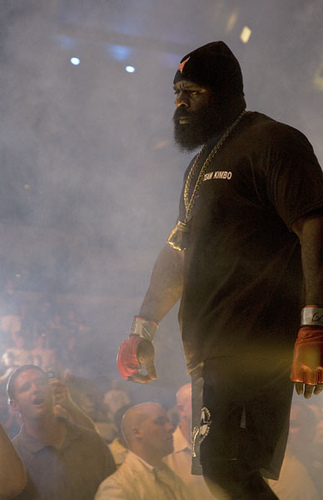
- Slice in 2007
- Born: Kevin Ferguson; February 8, 1974; Nassau, Bahamas
- Died: June 6, 2016 (aged 42); Margate, Florida, U.S.
- Height: 6 ft 2 in (188 cm)
- Weight: 225 lb (102 kg; 16 st 1 lb)
- Division: Heavyweight
- Reach: 77 in (196 cm)
- Fighting out of: Miami, Florida
- Team: American Top Team
- Years active: 2005, 2007–2010, 2015–2016 (MMA); 2011–2013 (Boxing)

Professional boxing record
- Total: 7
- Wins: 7
- By knockout: 6

Mixed martial arts record
- Total: 8
- Wins: 5
- By knockout: 4
- By decision: 1
- Losses: 2
- By knockout: 2
- No contests: 1

Mixed martial arts exhibition record
- Total: 2
- Wins: 1
- By submission: 1
- Losses: 1
- By knockout: 1

Other information
- Occupation: Mixed martial artist; boxer; bare-knuckle boxer; actor
- Children: 6
- Notable relatives: Rhadi Ferguson (cousin)
- Boxing record from BoxRec
- Mixed martial arts record from Sherdog
- Last updated on: August 13, 2011

Kevin Ferguson (February 8, 1974 – June 6, 2016), better known as Kimbo Slice, was a Bahamian-American mixed martial artist, professional boxer, and actor. Originally a bare-knuckle boxer, he became noted for his role in mutual combat street fight videos in the 2000s which were spread online, leading Rolling Stone to call him "The King of the Web Brawlers".

Turning to mixed martial arts in 2005, Slice left the underground fighting scene and signed a professional contract with EliteXC after making his MMA debut with Cage Fury Fighting Championships in 2007, scoring a win over MMA pioneer and former UFC heavyweight contender Tank Abbott in 2008. In 2009, he joined the UFC by competing in The Ultimate Fighter: Heavyweights, where he lost in his first fight to eventual series winner Roy Nelson. In his official UFC debut, Slice defeated Houston Alexander at the TUF 10 Finale, before suffering a loss to Matt Mitrione at UFC 113 in 2010.

After becoming a free agent via his dismissal from the UFC, Slice ventured into the professional boxing circuit, competing as a pro fighter from 2011 to 2013. In January 2015, he signed a contract with Bellator MMA going on to defeat MMA icon and long time veteran Ken Shamrock. He died of heart failure in 2016 and was posthumously inducted into the Bare Knuckle Boxing Hall of Fame later that year.

== Early life and education ==
Slice was born Kevin Ferguson in Nassau, Bahamas, on February 8, 1974. He moved to the U.S. as a child and grew up in Cutler Ridge, Florida. He was raised with his brother Devon and sister Renea by his mother Rosemary Clarke. He went to Bel-Air Elementary School, where he was reportedly involved in his first fight with fellow student Dominic Sauer at the age of 13 as he tried to defend a friend. Ferguson continued his studies at Cutler Ridge Middle School and later attended Richmond Heights Middle School. He attended Miami Palmetto High School, where he was the star middle linebacker. In 1992, his house in Perrine, Florida was destroyed by Hurricane Andrew, forcing him to live in his 1987 Nissan Pathfinder for a month.

Ferguson attended both Bethune–Cookman University and the University of Miami, where he was awarded an athletic scholarship and studied criminal justice but dropped out after a year and a half.

== Career ==
In 1997, he had a tryout with the Miami Dolphins and was part of the pre-season squad but was unable to secure a spot on the first team. Slice's cousin is United States judoka Rhadi Ferguson.

Ferguson started working as a bouncer for a strip club until high school friend and career-long manager, Mike Imber, offered him a job as a limousine driver and bodyguard for RK Netmedia, better known as Reality Kings, a Miami-based pornography production/promotion company responsible for a number of popular adult subscription websites. Ferguson maintained close ties with Reality Kings throughout the rest of his life; company representatives accompanied him, as his fight entourage, under the name Team Kimbo.

In 2002, he was charged with carrying a concealed weapon and in 2003, he began his career in unsanctioned mutual combat street fights. They were distributed through the Internet, mainly through the adult website SublimeDirectory and various other video platforms. In his first taped fight against a man named Big D, Ferguson left a large cut on his opponent's right eye which led Internet fans to call him Slice, becoming the last name to his already popular childhood nickname, Kimbo. His only ever loss in a street fight was to Sean Gannon, a Boston police officer and fellow mixed martial artist, in 2004.

== Mixed martial arts career ==
=== Early career (2005–2007) ===
In 2005, Slice started training in martial arts at the Freestyle Fighting Academy under Marcos Avellan and David Avellan. At first, Slice was training exclusively for illegal street boxing, focusing on bare-knuckle techniques, dirty boxing from the clinch, and elbows—but then he began to develop an interest for MMA.

As an amateur, Slice lost his first and only bout to Jay Ellis by KO in the first round on October 8, 2005, at the 2nd event of the Xtreme Fighting Organization trials.

In 2006, Slice signed to fight against former WBO Heavyweight champion and Olympic gold-medalist boxer Ray Mercer in a CFFC event in 2007. Slice was 33 years old facing Mercer, who would be 46 years old at the time. The match was scheduled as a three-round exhibition utilizing all professional rules of MMA combat, but did not count towards a professional record.

A month prior to the fight, Slice switched camps and was trained by retired MMA fighter Bas Rutten and boxing instructor Randy Khatami at Rutten's school, EliteMMA, in Thousand Oaks, California.

Slice and Mercer fought at Cage Fury Fighting Championships 5, in Atlantic City on June 23, 2007. Slice defeated Mercer with a guillotine choke at 1:12 into the first round. CFFC V sold 20,000 ppv buys. In a post-fight interview, Slice stated that he would like to fight David "Tank" Abbott. Abbott, who was a spectator, stood up from his seat and accepted the call out. One of the matchmakers for CFFC asked Slice for his assurance so that an October 12 bout at Cage Fury Fighting Championships 6 between Slice and "Tank" Abbott could be organized. This event was later canceled due to a promotion dispute. On October 11, 2007, ProElite announced that they had signed Slice to a deal and that he would make his professional debut on the November 10, 2007 EliteXC.

=== Elite XC (2007–2008) ===
==== Turning professional and MMA icon ====
Slice fought Bo Cantrell, 10–9, at EliteXC: Renegade. He was originally set to make his professional MMA debut against Mike Bourke, a reformed street fighter, but a shoulder injury from Bourke led him to face Bo Cantrell. Slice defeated Cantrell 19 seconds into the first round by submission due to strikes, landing a variety of elbows and body punches, after Cantrell failed to land a spinning back fist.

On February 16, 2008, Slice fought Tank Abbott in the main event at EliteXC: Street Certified. He won by KO 43 seconds into the first round due to strikes, taking his pro record to 2–0. At the fight, his weight was announced at an all-time low of 234 lb (106 kg), a far cry from his street fighting days of 280 lb (130 kg). During his ensuing three fights, Slice did not utilize full skills in MMA and relied heavily on striking, punches and elbows, and modified Muay Thai.

On May 31, 2008, Slice fought in the main event of the first ever mixed martial arts event shown on prime time network television, EliteXC: Primetime. Though one of the judges had each fighter winning one of the first two rounds, Slice's opponent James Thompson won both on total points by repeatedly taking down Slice and grounding and pounding. In the opening seconds of the third round, however, Slice threw a haymaker to Thompson's left ear, which ruptured Thompson's cauliflower. This was soon followed by three unanswered punches to a standing Thompson, which led to a referee stoppage and the controversial win for Slice. Fellow EliteXC competitor Brett Rogers, who himself had previously defeated Thompson in a previous Elite XC event, was particularly critical of Slice's victory, calling Slice's performance "garbage" in a post fight interview. Frank Mir was also a critic of Slice, stating in an interview that "every time Kimbo Slice fights, it sets (mixed martial arts) back".

==== Fight with Petruzelli ====
On October 4, 2008, a Kimbo Slice vs. Ken Shamrock fight was supposed to take place at the BankAtlantic Center in Sunrise, Florida as part of CBS' Saturday Night Fights. However, Shamrock received a cut to the left eye during a warm-up only hours before the fight was to take place. This left the head of fight operations, Jeremy Lappen, to choose a replacement for the fight. Options were Seth Petruzelli, Aaron Rosa and Frank Shamrock. Slice's team stated they did not want him fighting Frank no matter how much money was offered to them, so Lappen decided that Petruzelli was the best option for the main event. Slice agreed to take the fight after receiving a raise in pay, and took in $500,000. Petruzelli defeated Slice by TKO 14 seconds into the first round of the bout.

Interviewed on Orlando radio show The Monsters in the Morning two days after the fight, Seth Petruzelli said that when they offered him a spot in the main event, EliteXC promoters added monetary incentives to dissuade him from using certain fighting techniques against Slice, in an attempt to protect their relatively unproven Internet star.

The promoters kinda hinted to me and they gave me the money to stand and throw with him, they didn't want me to take him down. Let's just put it that way. It was worth my while to try and stand up punch him.

This added to the controversy surrounding the representation of Slice as a top flight martial artist by CBS and EliteXC. The Florida Department of Business and Professional Regulation started a preliminary investigation on the events surrounding the fight and its outcome.

However, Petruzelli retracted this statement a few hours later, claiming in a follow-up interview with MMA website FiveOuncesofPain.com that his previous comments on The Monsters had been misinterpreted.

What was meant to be said was that I wanted to keep the fight standing for myself because I knew that was what the crowd, the promoters, and everyone wanted to see because that's more exciting than just taking someone to the ground. That was my thing only. I wanted to keep it exciting so I decided to keep it standing. It had nothing to do with anybody else. That was all me.

On October 23, 2008, the Florida Department of Business and Professional Regulation concluded its investigation of the bout and found no wrongdoing. By the end of October 2008, EliteXC was forced to file for bankruptcy. Many in the mixed martial arts community, including Jay Thompson, executive consultant to the company, attributed EliteXC and ProElite's failure due to Slice's loss to Seth Petruzelli.

=== The Ultimate Fighter (2009) ===
After Elite Xtreme Combat ceased operations, Dana White stated that if Slice wanted to compete in the Ultimate Fighting Championship he would have to win his way in by competing on The Ultimate Fighter TV show. White went on to say that he might create a show with heavyweights just for Kimbo Slice if he wanted in. That statement became reality on June 1, when Kevin Iole of Yahoo.com stated Slice would participate in The Ultimate Fighter: Heavyweights.

The coaches for the show were Quinton Jackson and Rashad Evans, both former UFC Light Heavyweight Champions. Slice was the number one pick for coach Rampage and the second pick overall. In his first fight of the show, Slice was defeated by Roy Nelson via TKO stoppage in the second round after repeated punches to the head in the crucifix position. The broadcast was the highest rated MMA show in U.S. history with a 3.7 rating. The fight itself had 6 million viewers.

Following defeat in the preliminary round, Slice did not leave the show like some contestants after elimination, continuing to train with the remaining participants, befriending some of them and sharpening his own combat skills, particularly ground fighting and defense. Slice later turned down the opportunity to take Matt Mitrione's place in the quarter-finals after it was revealed that he had arthritis in his knee. Slice brought record breaking views during his time on The Ultimate Fighter, and given his humbleness and apparent potential as he fought and honed his skills, it was decided he would be offered a contract by the UFC promotion regardless of his elimination at the hands of Nelson, albeit a lesser valued one than the coveted six figure deal the winner would receive.

=== Ultimate Fighting Championship (2009–2010) ===
Following his time on the Ultimate Fighter, Kimbo Slice would have two official fights in the UFC promotion.

Slice made his debut when he fought Houston Alexander on December 5, 2009, at The Ultimate Fighter: Heavyweights Finale at a catchweight of 215 pounds (98 kg). In a fight that many thought would not leave the first round, Alexander would instead spend most of the first and third rounds circling Slice tentatively with little engagement. In the second round Slice managed to secure a suplex which very well may have tipped the judges' scorecards in his favor. Slice would win the bout by unanimous decision (29–28, 29–28, and 30–27) and Alexander would be cut from the promotion only days later, whilst Slice would earn another chance to compete in the promotion at a higher level.

While at the UFC 107 pre-fight press event, Dana White stated his belief that Slice would function better in the Light heavyweight division when addressing Slice's future in the UFC, but did not believe he cut enough pounds to make weight. Mostapha al-Turk was reported as potential opponent for Slice if he was to move forward as a Heavyweight.

On May 8, 2010, Slice made his pay-per-view and official heavyweight debut in his second fight at UFC 113 against his fellow Ultimate Fighter veteran Matt Mitrione. He ended up losing in the second round via a TKO. Slice exhibited the same sharpened ground fighting skill he gained from The Ultimate Fighter, landing an explosive takedown early on and was thought to have taken the first round on the judges cards, but Mitrione began to chop down the senior Slice with hard leg kicks that led to him gaining mount. Following the loss to Mitrione, Dana White stated that it was "probably Kimbo's last fight in the UFC". But he still praised Slice, stating "He's impressed me as a human being and as a fighter, and I like him and the guys who represent him very much. I'm glad to have met Kimbo Slice" and the former street brawler had made it farther in the promotion than he expected. He was indeed subsequently released from his contract the following day, alongside welterweight Paul Daley. Slice ended his brief stint in the UFC with an Octagon record of 1-1 (1 KO loss), and an overall MMA record of 4–2.

=== Retirement ===
Following his dismissal from the UFC, Slice became a free agent. MMA junkie reported that Mike Imber, Slice's manager, confirmed that he was considering all of his options in the free agency market, including mixed martial arts and newly opened boxing opportunities, but Imber declined to confirm or reveal any of them. It was soon revealed that Slice attempted to negotiate a contract with the promotion Strikeforce, but could not agree to terms because of dispute over his fight pay. However it was later stated that at time Strikeforce CEO was in no hurry to sign Slice following his release from the UFC. In August 2010, Slice, aged 36, announced his retirement from MMA competition to pursue a career in professional boxing.

== Professional boxing career ==
In August 2010, Slice announced his intention to become a professional boxer. He stated "I feel like a baby all over again. I'm thinking about this at night. I'm gonna be a problem in the heavyweight division. I'm going to be coming in with a bad demeanor. I want to see what it's like to break some ribs, break a jaw with one punch. This is a career move. I love fighting. I like to knock people the fuck out. I love engaging. Maybe some people think I'm crazy."

=== Early career ===
Slice made his pro boxing debut on August 13, 2011. Slice fought in a four-round headlining attraction against 39-year-old James Wade (0–1) at the Buffalo Run Casino in Miami, Oklahoma. He won the fight via KO at 0:10 in the first round.

On October 15, Slice returned to the boxing ring, defeating Tay Bledsoe (2–3) via KO in the first round. On December 30, he defeated Charles Hackmann (0–1) by unanimous decision, winning three out of four rounds, putting his record to 3-0 (2 KOs), to end off 2011.

=== 2012 ===
Slice had three fights in 2012. He defeated Jesse Porter (3–4) and Howard Jones (5–4) both by first-round KO, but the more prominent came in the form of fellow Mixed martial artist, Brian Green (27–17).

==== Slice vs Green ====
Slice fought Green in Missouri, and the bout nearly went the distance. Green took all four rounds on the cards, but in the closing seconds of the final round, Slice landed a left uppercut that dropped and knocked Green out, marking a mild upset. There was controversy and accusations the fight was a fixed and staged event, as Green admitted to wearing 20 pound ankle weights to fool the state commission, and was heavily ridiculed for it was believed he took a dive.

=== 2013 ===
==== Slice vs Tilyard ====
Slice's next fight, the highest profile one of his career, was in Australia on the Anthony Mundine vs Daniel Geale undercard on January 30, 2013. He defeated Shane Tilyard (6–6), former 2x ANBF Queensland champion and IBF PP cruiser title challenger, by TKO in the second round.

When he announced his intention to move from MMA to boxing, Roy Jones Jr. had said he would like to fight Slice, but that Slice would likely need a number of boxing matches beforehand in order to gain experience and exposure in the sport. Despite Slice having amassing what would have been enough experience on paper, the fight never materialized. Additionally, it was heavily rumored, and Slice apparently was open to the event, that he and Eric "Butterbean" Esch were eying to get into the ring with each other, with Butterbean having even called out Slice early on during his MMA career, having fought in MMA himself, in 2008. This rumored bout also never materialized and Slice ended his stint in professional boxing a record of 7-0 (6 KOs).

== Return to MMA ==
=== Return at Bellator MMA (2015–2016) ===
In June 2014, it was reported that Bellator MMA was aiming to sign Slice. Slice ultimately remained inactive as a boxer and mixed martial artist in 2014, and did formally accept the offer and remained a free agent.

On January 16, 2015, nearly five years since his retirement and more than two years of absence from combat sports, Bellator MMA announced that Slice had signed a multi-fight deal. He defeated Ken Shamrock by first-round TKO in his June 19 debut at Bellator 138. Some observers noted the fight appeared to be fixed, like a professional wrestling match. Bellator commentator Jimmy Smith credited the fight looking as it did to Shamrock's lack of technique and durability, and said if it was fixed, Bellator wasn't in on the deal.

==== Fight with Dhafir Harris ====
On February 19, 2016, at Bellator 149, Slice faced Dada 5000. The duo had a big rivalry between them due to their old street fight legacies they had in Perrine, Florida. In the first round, both fighters gassed out almost immediately, and Slice went on to win an uneventful fight via TKO when Dada collapsed from apparent exhaustion in the third round. Following the bout it was reported that Slice had failed his pre-fight drug test. Lab results found traces of the anabolic steroid nandrolone. He was also found to have an elevated testosterone/epitestosterone (T/E) ratio of 6.4:1, which is above the maximum allowed limit of 4:1. On May 2, 2016, it was revealed that Slice had settled with the Texas Athletic Commission with a fine of $2,500 and a revoking of his license in the state of Texas. The result of the bout has also been changed to a no contest. Despite being widely panned by critics, the fight attracted approximately 2.5 million viewing households, breaking the Bellator record of 2.4 million, set by Kimbo vs Shamrock.

In April 2016, Bellator President Scott Coker announced on ESPN's SportsCenter that Slice would have a rematch against James Thompson in the main event of Bellator 158, which would take place on July 16, 2016, at London's O2 Arena. Slice died of heart failure before this fight could happen.

== Professional wrestling ==
After departing from the UFC and announcing his intent to enter other aspects of combat sports, Slice was to make his debut in professional wrestling on February 5, 2011, against former sumo wrestler Shinichi Suzukawa at the Inoki Genome Federation's "Genome 14" event in Fukuoka, Japan; he pulled out of the match due to getting injured during practice.

== Other media coverage ==
A series called "Junk Yard Training" was released on yardbarker.com and YouTube.com that featured LaDainian Tomlinson, running back for the San Diego Chargers, training in Kimbo's backyard. In 2009, Kimbo starred in an antivirus software advertisement called Caterpillar vs. Kimbo.

Slice was featured on The Iron Ring, a television series airing on BET that features MMA prospects. Slice was part of the selection process for the participants. He made his official acting debut when playing the character Bludge on Nickelodeon's 2008 holiday special, Merry Christmas, Drake & Josh. He also played an inmate named JC in 2009's fighting film Blood and Bone.

== Personal life and death ==
In May 1994, Ferguson married L. Shontae, the mother of three of his children, including son Kevin Jr., also a mixed martial artist. At the time of his death, he was engaged to his long-time girlfriend.

On June 3, 2016, Ferguson was admitted to a hospital in Margate, Florida. He died of congestive heart failure on June 6 at the age of 42. An autopsy also revealed a mass on his liver. Scott Coker, CEO of Bellator MMA, said, "We are all shocked and saddened by the devastating and untimely loss of Kimbo Slice, a beloved member of the Bellator family." Dada, despite their rivalry and remembering the one-time friendship, paid tribute to his fallen adversary on the Instagram social media page, citing him as someone who "Showed the world that a guy from the back yard circuit can make it in professional sports and do the impossible".

== Legacy ==
Slice is regarded by many to be a legendary figure in the sport of mixed martial arts. He set a Spike TV record, that stood during its fifteen years of operation, by participating in The Ultimate Fighter: Heavyweights bringing a viewing of more than 6.1 million views on the episode where he fought and was eliminated early on by the tournament winner Roy Nelson in the opening round, trumping any other UFC content aired on the broadcasting.

The UFC promotion released a statement following Slice's passing: "is saddened to learn of the passing of Kevin Ferguson, known to fans around the world as Kimbo Slice" for his time with the organization on the TUF 10 season and his fights in the Octagon. It was reflected that he "carried himself as a true professional" during his time in the organization, and condolences were offered Slice's friends and surviving kin.

== Professional boxing record ==
7 fights	7 wins	0 losses
By knockout	6	0
By decision	1	0

No.	Result	Record	Opponent	Type	Round, time	Date	Location	Notes
7	Win	7–0	Shane Tilyard	KO	2 (4), 2:09	30 Jan 2013	Entertainment Centre, Sydney, Australia	
6	Win	6–0	Howard Jones	KO	1 (4), 0:57	6 Oct 2012	Buffalo Run Casino, Miami, Oklahoma, U.S.	
5	Win	5–0	Jesse Porter	KO	1 (4), 0:36	12 May 2012	Lucky Star Casino, Concho, Oklahoma, U.S.	
4	Win	4–0	Brian Green	KO	4 (4), 2:57	24 Mar 2012	O'Reilly Family Event Center, Springfield, Missouri, U.S.	
3	Win	3–0	Charles Hackmann	UD	4	30 Dec 2011	Buffalo Run Casino, Miami, Oklahoma, U.S.	
2	Win	2–0	Tay Bledsoe	KO	1 (4), 2:17	15 Oct 2011	Heartland Events Center, Grand Island, Nebraska, U.S.	
1	Win	1–0	James Wade	KO	1 (4), 0:17	13 Aug 2011	Buffalo Run Casino, Miami, Oklahoma, U.S.	

== Championships and accomplishments ==
- Ultimate Fighting Championship
  - UFC.com Awards
    - 2009: Ranked #10 Newcomer of the Year (Tied with Yoshihiro Akiyama & Todd Duffee) & Ranked #9 Upset of the Year vs. Houston Alexander
- Bloody Elbow
  - Personality of the Year (2009)

== Mixed martial arts record ==
=== Professional ===
Professional record breakdown
8 matches	5 wins	2 losses
By knockout	4	2
By decision	1	0
No contests	1	

Res.	Record	Opponent	Method	Event	Date	Round	Time	Location	Notes
NC	5–2 (1)	Dada 5000	NC (overturned)	Bellator 149	February 19, 2016	3	1:32	Houston, Texas, United States	Originally a TKO win for Slice; overturned after he tested positive for nandrolone and elevated T/E ratio.
Win	5–2	Ken Shamrock	TKO (punches)	Bellator 138	June 19, 2015	1	2:22	St. Louis, Missouri, United States	Catchweight bout (232 lbs).
Loss	4–2	Matt Mitrione	TKO (punches)	UFC 113	May 8, 2010	2	4:24	Montreal, Quebec, Canada	
Win	4–1	Houston Alexander	Decision (unanimous)	The Ultimate Fighter: Heavyweights Finale	December 5, 2009	3	5:00	Las Vegas, Nevada, United States	Catchweight bout (215 lbs).
Loss	3–1	Seth Petruzelli	TKO (punches)	EliteXC: Heat	October 4, 2008	1	0:14	Sunrise, Florida, United States	
Win	3–0	James Thompson	TKO (punches)	EliteXC: Primetime	May 31, 2008	3	0:38	Newark, New Jersey, United States	
Win	2–0	Tank Abbott	KO (punches)	EliteXC: Street Certified	February 16, 2008	1	0:43	Miami, Florida, United States	
Win	1–0	Bo Cantrell	TKO (submission to punches)	EliteXC: Renegade	November 10, 2007	1	0:19	Corpus Christi, Texas, United States	

=== Exhibition ===
Professional record breakdown
2 matches	1 win	1 loss
By knockout	0	1
By submission	1	0

Res.	Record	Opponent	Method	Event	Date	Round	Time	Location	Notes
Loss	1–1	Roy Nelson	TKO (punches)	The Ultimate Fighter: Heavyweights	June 10, 2009	2	2:01	Las Vegas, Nevada, United States	The Ultimate Fighter: Heavyweights Preliminary round.
Win	1–0	Ray Mercer	Submission (guillotine choke)	Cage Fury Fighting Championships V	June 23, 2007	1	1:12	Atlantic City, New Jersey, United States	

== Filmography ==
Year	Title	Film/Television	Role
2008	Merry Christmas, Drake & Josh	Television	Bludge
2009	Blood and Bone	Film	J.C.
2010	Locked Down	Film	King
2010	Circle of Pain	Film	Reg
2012	The Scorpion King 3: Battle for Redemption	Film	Zulu Kondo
2015	Dawg Fight	Film	Himself, Boxer

== See also ==
- List of male boxers
- List of male mixed martial artists
- List of mixed martial artists with professional boxing records
- List of multi-sport athletes
