= Black Tuna Gang =

American drug ring

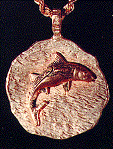
One of the gold medallions worn by the Black Tuna Gang to signify membership (Text by Drug Enforcement Administration).

The Black Tuna Gang was the name given to a gang led by Robert Platshorn and Robert Meinster in Miami in the 1970s. The group never called themselves the "Black Tuna Gang", but the name was used by the media based on the solid gold medallion with a black tuna emblem, worn by members to identify themselves. The gang also used the words "Black Tuna" as a code word when discussing drug shipments over the radio; this term was heard on DEA interception of their communications.

The gang was accused of importing around 500 tons of marijuana into the United States over the course of 16 months. The gang operated at least at one time from a suite in the Fontainebleau Hotel in Miami Beach, and arranged bulk deliveries to a boathouse.

At the time, the Black Tuna gang was alleged by the DEA to be one of the most sophisticated drug smuggling organizations encountered. The gang used specialized equipment to listen in on conversations by police and US Customs. They frequently used creative and unconventional methods of communication and organization, such as sending an associate a box of diapers as a coded message to signal they were ready to go ahead with a drug deal. They also modified the painted water lines on boats so that they could carry larger volumes of contraband without appearing to ride low in the water.

The gang was eventually brought down by a joint FBI-DEA effort known as Operation Banco, which traced numerous transactions through South Florida banks until finally their accountant was caught making a large deposit in a Miami Beach bank, and also obtained informants, such as Wade Bailey of Wilmington, NC, from within the gang. The operation that exposed the Black Tuna gang was the first joint FBI-DEA operation of its kind. Bailey was a key aspect in bringing down the gang. After contacting authorities, he completed a switch and carried the contraband into the Cape Fear region in exchange for immunity. Bailey later admitted that he skimmed nearly 400 lbs of contraband and later sold it.

During the trial, certain members of the gang were additionally accused of attempting to murder the presiding judge and bribe jurors, a claim the gang members denied. One of the jurors they were accused of attempting to bribe would ultimately be charged with obstruction of justice. In spite of this, a total of 8 members of the gang, Platshorn and Meinster among them, were convicted and received lengthy prison sentences.

The Black Tuna Gang was featured as part of the Rakontur documentary film Square Grouper: The Godfathers of Ganja.
