= Ethiopian Zion Coptic Church =

North American religious group

The Ethiopian Zion Coptic Church is a religious group that first emerged in Jamaica during the 1940s and later spread to the United States, being incorporated in Florida in 1975. Its beliefs are based on both the Old and New testaments of the bible, as well as the teachings of Marcus Garvey, self-reliance, Afrocentricity and Ethiopianism. Their ceremonies include bible reading, chanting, and music incorporating elements from Nyahbinghi, Burru, Kumina and other indigenous traditions. The group holds many beliefs in common with the Rastafari, including the use of marijuana as a sacrament, but differ on many points, most significantly the matter of Haile Selassie's divinity.

The group expanded rapidly in the 1970s, under the leadership of 'Niah' Keith Gordon, attracting a new generation of white American followers to their "Gospel camp" in Jamaica. The Coptic's pro-marijuana beliefs went as far as to consider it their duty to distribute it widely, and the new converts helped move ever larger consignments of "herb" from Jamaica to the United States. Proceeds from marijuana smuggling allowed the Coptics to acquire significant land holdings in Jamaica, as well as a luxurious 'embassy' in Miami. They also established numerous agricultural and business ventures in Jamaica, providing badly needed employment during the island's turbulent 1970s.

The group attracted widespread publicity in the early 1980s, when they were the subject of investigative TV reports, and several of its members were prosecuted for importing marijuana to the United States. The movement continues to this day, but went into decline when a large number of the American members were incarcerated in the 1980s, followed by the death of Keith Gordon in 1986.

Despite its name the group has no affiliation with either the Ethiopian Orthodox Church or Coptic Orthodox Church, and has radically different beliefs and practices from most Christian congregations.

== History ==
=== Early history under Louva Williams ===
The Coptic mansion emerged from Jamaican chapters of the Ethiopian World Federation during the late 1940s. It was founded by Lovell Williams, known as Brother Louv (pronounced 'love'), who established the key doctrines of the group. Brother Louv set up the first headquarters at Mountain View Avenue on the eastern side of Kingston at the foot of the Wareika Hills. It was one of many Rasta camps to the east of Kingston, including Count Ossie's, which had a different character from those in the west of the city. These were typically squatter camps, set up on 'captured' government lands. Brother Louv engaged in many 'reasonings' (discussions) during this time, both within the group and outside, which were often accompanied by ganja (marijuana) smoking.

The group persevered through the 1950s and 60s, with the small, dedicated group of followers living a simple life in accordance with their doctrine. While it was an offshoot of the broader Rasta movement, many Coptic beliefs conflicted with 'mainstream' Rasta teaching, and neither side considered the other to be one and the same.

=== Brother Ivy Camp at Papine ===
After Louva Williams passed in 1969 the group splintered for a short time, until George Baker Ivy brought several of the original followers together at a new camp in Hall's Delight above Papine in St. Andrew. It was during this period that the first white American members joined the group. Like most Rasta groups, in Louva William's time whites were not permitted to join, but he was said to have proclaimed that one day white people would come "seeking the doctrine". Thus when the first curious Americans arrived at the end of the 1960s Brother Ivy welcomed them. According to Clifton Middleton the first white convert to make his way to the camp was Howard Rosenbaum. The group's intense focus on ganja (even by Rasta standards), played no small part in attracting the newcomers. Many were also content to be in Jamaica and not in the US under threat of being drafted to fight in Vietnam.

Ivy was seen as a Christ-like figure by most of the new arrivals, and he began to impart the Coptic doctrine to them. Members lived side by side, working together to build up the camp, which included an open area for prayer, separate communal sleeping areas for men and women and a large kitchen. The group aimed to be self-sufficient and grew various crops in addition to ganja.

In an effort to raise funds, and carry out their duty to spread the 'holy herb', members organised the first ganja-smuggling missions to the US around this time. The American converts were central to this development as they could travel freely to the US and had connections there to distribute the product.

When George Ivy died in the early 1970s the group again experienced a period of instability. Some of the original black members felt the American's were bringing too much heat to the group, and demanded they leave. It was at this stage Keith Gordon, another elder from Louva William's time, set up a new camp in Trelawney, and invited the white members to regroup with him there.

=== Leadership of 'Niah' Keith Gordon ===
The new Cockpit Country camp was in the heart of the Jamaica's inaccessible, mountainous interior, which had for centuries served as refuge for Maroons escaping slavery. Under the new leadership of Keith Gordon the Coptics began to build the camp and live in much the same way as they had in Papine.

By all accounts Gordon was a dedicated member of the group and fully believed in its spiritual mission, but he also had a more practical side. Growing up in a single-parent family, he spent years hustling on the streets of Kingston before meeting Louva Williams and joining the Coptics. He drove a vehicle and lived with his wife and family in Kingston rather than at the camp, which gave him more contact with everyday Jamaicans than most members.

Under his guidance the ganja-smuggling enterprise intensified, the stated goal being to raise funds to increase the movement's physical presence in Jamaica, or "build a kingdom". The Americans would take turns making trips home on commercial flights, using a variety of means to conceal ganja. The main method in the early days was to empty cartons of cigarettes and replace the contents with compressed bricks of ganja, but they would also fill cigar boxes or tape it to their bodies to evade customs. Some got caught in the process and served short prison sentences.

=== Expansion in mid-1970s ===
A rapid phase of expansion began at this time. The airport smuggling continued and got more frequent, with cash pumped back into developing the camp, purchasing more land for cultivation, housing, electrification, plumbing, irrigation and other improvements. Much of the money being made was put into the purchase of a 34-foot long wooden boat, with the intention to use it for smuggling hundreds of kilos at a time from Jamaica to Florida. This first effort failed, despite some of the members having previous sailing experience, when the boat was sunk on its first trip from the US to Jamaica. Despite this setback the operation continued to grow, and in time several more boats were purchased which succeeded in smuggling ganja to the US.

The group found it increasingly difficult to manage the operation from their remote Trelawny camp, and wanted a base closer to Kingston. At the same time many wealthy Jamaicans were trying to leave the newly independent island, fearful of Michael Manley's socialist government and growing unrest. Many of them were happy to sell land to the Coptics, who could pay in dollars earned from their ganja smuggling. They also acted as an unofficial foreign exchange service to those who wished to avoid Manley's capital controls, exchanging US dollars in America for land in Jamaica.

The main properties they acquired were in St Thomas, on the eastern side of the island, starting with the Rozelle property, near White Horses, followed by the adjacent Creighton Hall estate near Yallahs. The group made this area in St Thomas their new base of operations, naming it 'Coptic Heights'. They began to work the land vigorously, planting multiple acres of coconuts, bananas, yams, tobacco, timber, sugarcane, ginger, carrots and other crops. Clifton Middleton states that "in less than a year we owned over 20,000 acres of land in Jamaica, a trucking company, a furniture factory, a cement company, numerous other developments of roads, reservoirs and power plants", as well as employing thousands of people in these efforts. Over the next years they carried out several building projects, built reservoirs and a saw mill, installed plumbing systems, and electrified the area. At the top of the hill overlooking the estate they built a tabernacle to hold their prayer meetings, painted red, gold and green. To celebrate its opening on August 6, 1978, the group held a large procession, at which members wore elaborate coloured robes.

=== Later growth in United States ===
It first established its organization in the United States in Star Island, Florida with a commune of around 40 members. The commune follows a combination of teachings from the Bible, Old and New Testament, which have been compared to Billy Graham's fundamentalism, and Kosher law. Similar to the Rastafari Movement, the Coptic's views are based on the teachings of Marcus Garvey and they use cannabis as sacrament. It is a misconception that pious Rastafarians smoke marijuana recreationally, and some (in particular, the canonical Ethiopian Orthodox and classical Elders) do not use it at all. However, many Rastafarian teachers have advocated for controlled ritual smoking of 'wisdom weed' in private as a meditation tool and communally from 'chalice' pipes as an 'incense to please the Lord.'

In 1979 the group was accused, tried, and convicted of smuggling massive amounts of potent cannabis from Jamaica to Miami in actions that kept the Jamaican economy afloat that decade. The then-Jamaican Prime Minister Edward Seaga told a U.S. interview "It's just a little sinsemilla that it keep the country going right now". The Coptics published a free newspaper promoting Garveyism and the decriminalization of marijuana titled "Coptic Times". They also appeared on 60 Minutes on October 28, 1979. The group's leader was Niah Keith Gordon, and its spokesman in the US was Thomas Reilly, also known as Brother Louv. During the same year, The Supreme Court of Florida found: "(1) the Ethiopian Zion Coptic Church represents a religion within the first amendment to the Constitution of the United States, and (2) the "use of cannabis is an essential portion of the religious practice." "Further, the Ethiopian Zion Coptic Church is not a new church or religion but the record reflects it is centuries old and has regularly used cannabis as its sacrament".

In 1986 the organization participated in the Drug Enforcement Administration's hearings on cannabis rescheduling in the United States.

On January 19, 2017 James Tranmer, a member of the group, was pardoned from a 33 year prison sentence for drug possession by Barack Obama.

Carl Olsen ran for governor in Iowa, as a Libertarian, in 1994 and for the U.S. House of Representatives, again as a Libertarian, in 1996. He is currently a priest in the Ethiopian Zion Coptic Church, and resides in Iowa.

The EZCC is not associated with either the Coptic Orthodox Church or the Coptic Catholic Church, both based in Egypt. The Coptic Orthodox Church has an Ethiopian sister church, which is also unrelated. The Garveyite Coptic were most closely tied to the African Orthodox Church than to Egypt. The EZCC gets its namesake from a 1959 mission to Ethiopia in which the archbishop brought a group of young Ethiopian priests and deacons to study in American universities. However, the clergy cut ties with the Garveyite Coptic organization in New York and set up its own parishes that addressed the needs of Ethiopian immigrants.

The Zion Coptic Church appeared in the 2011 Billy Corben documentary Square Grouper: The Godfathers of Ganja, whose first section concerns the group and features interviews with former members. In Brazil there are the First Niubingui Church Etiope Coptic of Zion of Brasil.
