= From Russia With Lev =

2024 documentary film

- Directed by: Billy Corben
- Produced by: Alfred Spellman; Rachel Maddow
- Production company: Rakontur
- Distributed by: MSNBC Films
- Release dates: September 7, 2024 (Brooklyn Academy of Music); September 20, 2024 (MSNBC)
- Country: United States
- Language: English

From Russia With Lev is a 2024 documentary film about Lev Parnas. It is the first documentary produced by cable news anchor Rachel Maddow.

== Production ==
According to Rachel Maddow, Parnas had a "come-to-Jesus moment" and wanted to repent for his actions; because he had recorded so much of what he had done -- "terabytes of data from his phone and iCloud accounts" -- he was able to share a lot of evidence with MSNBC.
