= Square grouper =

Slang term for compressed bales of illicit marijuana

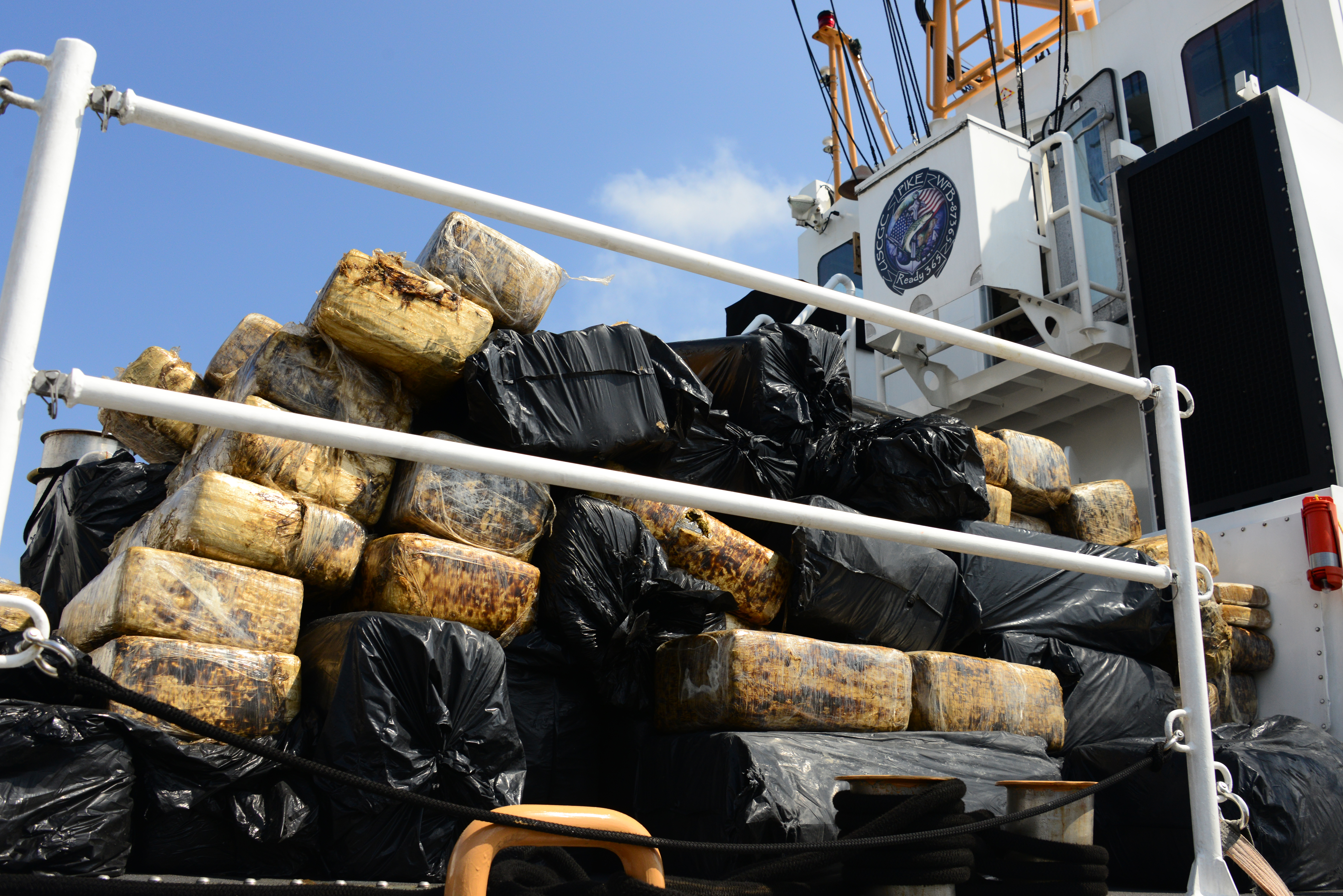
Bales of marijuana recovered from the ocean by crew of USCGC Pike after smugglers "began throwing them overboard as they fled" interdiction

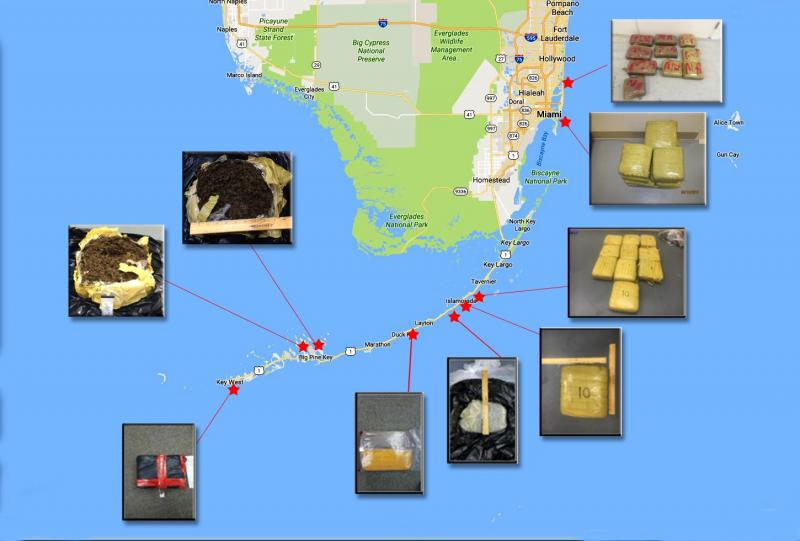
Locations on the coast of Florida where 400 pounds (180 kg) of marijuana was seized by U.S. Customs and the Coast Guard in a single month in 2016, who advised the public "If you are out on a boat or on the beach and you see a suspicious package, call local law enforcement immediately."

Square grouper is a slang term for compressed bales of illicit marijuana that appear on the U.S. Gulf Coast, sometimes lost by smugglers in errant air drops or sea to sea transfers, and sometimes intentionally dumped by crews who fear being caught with illegal drugs.

== In popular culture ==
- A tiki restaurant in the Florida Keys is named Square Grouper, as is another restaurant in Jupiter, Florida, on the Treasure Coast.
- A 2011 documentary, Square Grouper: The Godfathers of Ganja, by Billy Corben, concerns drug smuggling.
