= Men of War (2024 film) =

2024 American documentary film

- Release poster
- Directed by: Jen Gatien; Billy Corben
- Produced by: Alfred Spellman; Jen Gatien; Billy Corben
- Cinematography: Hernán Pérez; BJ Golnick; Gogy Esparza; Azahal Hare
- Edited by: Andrew Saunderson; David Cypkin
- Production companies: Neon; Deerjen; Rakontur; Hyperobject Industries
- Distributed by: Neon
- Release dates: September 6, 2024 (TIFF); May 30, 2025 (United States)
- Running time: 103 minutes
- Countries: United States; Canada
- Languages: English; Spanish

Men of War is a 2024 documentary film directed and produced by Jen Gatien and Billy Corben. It follows Jordan Goudreau and Operation Gideon (2020).

It had its world premiere at the Toronto International Film Festival on September 6, 2024. It was given a limited release for awards consideration on May 30, 2025, prior to video on demand on September 9, 2025, by Neon.

== Premise ==
Explores Jordan Goudreau and his security firm Silvercorp USA infiltrating Venezuela by sea to remove Nicolás Maduro from power in Operation Gideon (2020).

== Production ==
Neon fully financed the film, with Adam McKay serving as an executive producer under his Hyperobject Industries banner. Gatien and Corben filmed Jordan Goudreau from 2021 onwards.

== Release ==
It had its world premiere at the Toronto International Film Festival on September 6, 2024. It also screened at Woodstock Film Festival on October 15, 2024. and CPH:DOX 2025 on March 22, 2025. It was limitedly released for awards consideration on May 30, 2025, prior to video on demand on September 9, 2025, by Neon.

== Reception ==
On the review aggregator website Rotten Tomatoes, 82% of 11 critics' reviews are positive.

Matt Zoller Seitz of RogerEbert.com gave the film three out of four stars, calling it "fascinating" and "rich in ways that may or may not be intentional."
