= Rakontur =

Miami-based media studio

- Type: Subsidiary
- Industry: Motion pictures
- Founded: 2000 (original); 2013 (relaunch)
- Founder: Billy Corben; Alfred Spellman
- Headquarters: Miami, Florida, U.S.

rakontur is a Miami-based media studio founded by Billy Corben and Alfred Spellman in 2000.

== History ==
Rakontur's feature documentary debut, Raw Deal: A Question of Consent, premiered at the Sundance Film Festival in 2001, making Corben the youngest director to premiere in Sundance history. Examining the alleged rape of an exotic dancer at a University of Florida fraternity house, the film utilized extensive clips from videotape footage of the alleged assault. Considered by critics to be “one of the most controversial films of the modern day” and “one of the most compelling pieces of non-fiction ever produced,” (Film Threat Magazine), Raw Deal landed on the cover of New York Post and has been seen all over the world.

Following that success Rakontur took on another Florida true-crime story, this one closer to home. The New York Times called Cocaine Cowboys, “a hyperventilating account of the blood-drenched Miami drug culture in the 1970s and 1980s.” The non-fiction film chronicles how the cocaine trade built their hometown of Miami through firsthand accounts of some of the most successful smugglers of the era and the deadliest hitman of the cocaine wars.

Cocaine Cowboys was New York Magazine's Critic's Pick when it premiered at the 2006 Tribeca Film Festival and, after a limited theatrical release, the movie became a worldwide phenomenon on DVD and the highest-rated documentary in the history of the Showtime cable network. The sequel, Cocaine Cowboys 2: Hustlin’ with the Godmother, was released in 2008.

The U, a feature documentary about the championship history of the University of Miami Hurricanes football program, produced by Rakontur for ESPN's 30 for 30 series, became the highest-rated documentary in the network's 30-year history, when it debuted on December 12, 2009, following the Heisman Trophy presentation.

Rakontur debuted two new films in the first half of 2011. Square Grouper: The Godfathers of Ganja, examining the free-wheeling pot smuggling of South Florida in the 1970s, had its world premiere at the SXSW Film Festival in March, followed by a limited theatrical and DVD release by Magnolia Pictures.

Rakontur released Broke, a documentary about former professional athletes who have squandered their wealth, at the 2012 Tribeca Film Festival.

In 2012, the company produced Dawg Fight, a brutal exposé on underground backyard MMA fighting in one of Miami's toughest neighborhoods.

In 2007 and again in 2010, Rakontur was selected for the Realscreen Global 100, “an annual list of the most exciting and influential production companies working in non-fiction film and television." In December 2009, the Miami New Times declared Cocaine Cowboys #3 on its "Top Ten of the Decade: Miami in Pop Culture."

== Filmography ==
- Raw Deal: A Question of Consent (2001)
- Cocaine Cowboys (2006)
- Cocaine Cowboys 2: Hustlin' with the Godmother (2008)
- Clubland (2008)
- The U (2009)
- Square Grouper (2011)
- Limelight (2011)
- Broke (2012)
- Collision Course (2013)
- The Tanning of America: One Nation Under Hip Hop (2014)
- Cocaine Cowboys Reloaded (2014)
- The U Part 2 (2014)
- Dawg Fight (2015)
- Miami Beach 100 (2015)
- Magic City Hustle (2019)
- Screwball (2019)
- 537 Votes (2020)
- Macho Man (2021)
- From Russia With Lev (2024)
