= Limelight (2011 film) =

- Directed by: Billy Corben
- Produced by: Billy Corben; Jen Gatien; Alfred Spellman
- Starring: 50 Cent; Jay-Z; Moby
- Cinematography: Ralf Gonzalez; Alexa Harris; Trisha Solyn; Randy Valdes
- Edited by: Sam Rega
- Music by: Brian Leiser
- Release date: September 23, 2011
- Running time: 103 minutes
- Country: United States
- Language: English

Limelight is a 2011 documentary film that charts the rise and fall of New York City club king Peter Gatien. Produced by Gatien's daughter, Jen Gatien, it was released in special markets throughout the United States and Canada on September 23, 2011.

== Synopsis ==
As the owner of legendary New York City hotspots like The Limelight, Tunnel, Palladium, and Club USA, Peter Gatien was considered by many to be the undisputed king of the 1980s New York City club scene. The Ontario native, whose trademark eye patch made him stand out in a crowd, built and oversaw a chain of nightclub ventures that brought thousands of patrons per night during its peak years. However, after years of legal battles and police pressure spearheaded by Mayor Rudolph Giuliani's drive to crack down on the city's nightlife scene during the mid-1990s, Gatien was deported to Canada, bringing an end to his presence and influence in the city's nightlife scene. The documentary features interviews with numerous people involved in the club's scene, as well as key informants in Gatien's high-profile trial. Produced by Gatien's daughter, Jen, and Alfred Spellman, and directed by Billy Corben (who previously directed the film Cocaine Cowboys), the film documents the rise and fall of Gatien and his nightclub empire.

== Featured interviews ==
- Peter Gatien
- Michael Alig
- Ed Koch
- Howard Safir

== Distribution ==
Limelight premiered on April 22 at the 2011 Tribeca Film Festival. World distribution rights were acquired by Magnolia Pictures prior to the Tribeca premiere.

== Feature film adaptation ==
As of April 12, 2018, Alfonso Gomez-Rejon was set to direct the feature film adaptation of Limelight, with Nicholas Pileggi and JJ Sacha writing the script, Jen Gatien & Christopher Donnelly producing the film and Amazon Studios distributing the film adaptation.
