= Cocaine Cowboys 2 =

- Directed by: Billy Corben and Lisa M. Perry
- Produced by: Alfred Spellman; Billy Corben; David Cypkin
- Edited by: Billy Corben; David Cypkin
- Release date: July 29, 2008
- Running time: 97 minutes
- Country: United States
- Language: English

Cocaine Cowboys 2, also known as Cocaine Cowboys II: Hustlin' With the Godmother, is a 2008 documentary film sequel to Cocaine Cowboys (2006). Directed by Billy Corben and Lisa M. Perry and produced by Rakontur, the film features Charles Cosby, Nelson Andreu, and Jorge "Rivi" Ayala and the Colombian-born "Cocaine Godmother", drug lord Griselda Blanco.

Set in 1992, the film follows and is largely narrated by Cosby, a small time cocaine dealer from a broken home located in Oakland's inner-city, "whose life is changed forever when he writes a fan letter to the "Cocaine Godmother" Griselda Blanco, who is serving time at a nearby federal prison. Six months later, Cosby is a multi-millionaire, Blanco's lover, and the head of her $40 million a year cocaine business." Although Blanco was imprisoned by the time Cosby met her, through Cosby and other intermediates, she was still able to organize a multi-million dollar cocaine empire, importing cocaine into California and distributing it to various locations across the United States.

The relationship between Blanco and Cosby eventually came to an end when Jorge "Rivi" Ayala, Blanco's former hitman and enforcer, agreed to testify against her on the subject of several murders she had ordered. Blanco, facing a possible death sentence, attempted to organize the kidnapping of John F. Kennedy Jr., aiming to use him as a hostage to secure her release. Cosby claims to have balked at the prospect of engaging in such a serious crime with a lengthy sentence, preventing the kidnapping from taking place. Cosby himself was later subpoenaed to testify against Blanco, but the case against her collapsed when Rivi was implicated in a phone sex scandal with secretaries in the Florida State Attorney's office. Blanco was deported from the United States after her sentence was complete.

The documentary also explores Blanco's criminal past, including her rise to prominence in the Miami drug trade, before her involvement in escalating criminal conflict in Miami, her relocation to California and eventual imprisonment.

== Acting credits ==
- Charles Cosby – Himself
- Donovan Kennedy – Himself
- Will Collins – Himself
- Jorge "Rivi" Ayala – Himself
- Al Singleton – Himself
- Bob Palombo – Himself
- Nelson Andreu – Himself
- Raul Diaz – Himself
- Luis Casuso – Himself
- Samuel I. Burstyn – Himself
