= Roach (smoking) =

Stub of a smoked cigar and cigarette

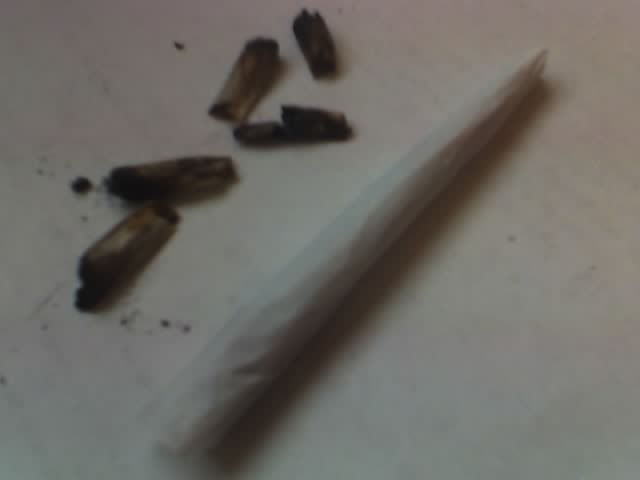
Several burnt roaches and a joint

A roach is the remains of a joint or blunt after most of it has been smoked. Most roaches are disposed of immediately after smoking a joint; however, some users will retain the roach for use at a later date.

Small metal clips to facilitate the smoking of a "roach" are called roach clips. Roach clips cover a wide variety of paraphernalia including alligator clips, forceps, hemostats, needle nose pliers, ceramic pieces with holes through them, and tweezers.

In Europe, the United Kingdom and most Commonwealth nations, "roach" can also refer to a bit of rolled thin cardboard in one end to serve as a mouthpiece - called a "Roach Tip", "Smoking Tip", "crutch" or "filter" in North America. When this is employed, a joint can still be held securely after it has burnt down to a short length; thus, the entire length of the joint may be smoked without the aid of a roach clip.

== Etymology ==
In Spanish, tabaco de cucaracha ("roach tobacco") refers to powdery, low-quality tobacco.

=== La Cucaracha ===
According to Nicole Callier the term roach was inspired by the Latin American folk song "La Cucaracha". While the exact origins of the song remain unknown the version that is thought to have referenced the roach is the commonly cited version that ridicules Mexican Revolutionary leader Pancho Villa. The revolutionary version was reportedly sung by Villa's troops during battle. Callier has suggested that in cannabis culture the roach represents the end of a joint and that the song is about "running out of cannabis and not being able to get high, just like the roach is unable to walk because it's missing a leg".

Excerpt
| La cucaracha, la cucaracha Ya no puede caminar Porque no tiene porque le falta Marihuana que fumar | The cockroach, the cockroach Cannot walk anymore Because it hasn't because it lacks marijuana to smoke |

=== Mexican immigration into the United States ===
Callier argues that the term 'roach' entered into American Cannabis culture through a wave of Mexican immigration after the Mexican Revolution in 1910. The Mexican Revolution of 1910 led to a wave of Mexican immigration into the United States in particular through the American Southwest bringing with them cannabis. Schlosser suggests that "the prejudices and fears that greeted these peasant immigrants also extended to their traditional means of intoxication; smoking marijuana".

Due to the relatively inexpensive cost of cannabis it became popular with impoverished and marginalised groups throughout North America. However due to perceived social harms it became the subject of an intense campaign by the newly formed Federal Bureau of Investigation. In places such as New Orleans newspapers linked cannabis with marginalised groups such as "African-Americans, jazz musicians, prostitutes, and underworld whites". Police officers in Texas claimed that marijuana incited violent crimes, aroused a "lust for blood", and gave its users "superhuman strength".

=== Jazz Age ===
One of the first documented mainstream appearances of the term "roach" in the Western media is found in a The New Yorker feature article in 1938 writing about marijuana or "viper" culture in Harlem during the 1930s. The article "Tea for a Viper" was written by investigative journalist Meyer Berger as he encounters a series of African American jazz musicians smoking cannabis. In the article Berger describes a roach as "a pinched off smoke, or stub is a roach".

During the Jazz Age marijuana culture flourished in North America and is largely credited with forming the "stoner" culture. Terminology such as munchies, cotton mouth and greening out is referenced in the works of African American jazz musicians such as Louis Armstrong, Stuff Smith and Lucille Bogan. A "viper" was known as someone who consumes marijuana.

In 1943, Time published its first article on the 'weed'. The article describes the 'roach' as the remains of a smoked down joint, suggesting that it was a desirable meant to be reused. The article recalls that "the viper [drug user] may then quietly "blast the weed" (smoke). Two or three long puffs usually suffice after a while to produce a light jag. The smoker is then said to be "high" or "floating". When he has smoked a reefer [cannabis] down to a half-inch butt, he carefully conserves it in an empty match box. In this condition it is known, in Mexican, as a chicharra, or in English, as a "roach".

The term roach is mentioned by Armstrong when recounting an arrest for drug possession in a biography by Max Jones and John Chilton, The Louis Armstrong Story: 1900-1971 shortly:

"The trumpeter was playing at the Cotton Club in Culver City, CA, near Hollywood, in a band that featured his favourite drummer, Vic Berton. The two were sharing a joint outside in the parking lot between sets. Unbeknownst to them, a rival club owner had summoned two detectives who saddled up to the pair and said, "We'll take the roach, boys.""

== Tobacco-related illnesses ==
In many European countries it is common to add tobacco into a joint, as a means of preserving cannabis. There are several risks associated with this practice due to the increased exposure to toxic carcinogenic materials versus alternative methods of cannabis consumption such as edibles and vaporizing. It is estimated that a single joint could cause as much damage as 2.5–5 cigarettes. The consumption of combusted properties of a substance will often form toxic and carcinogenic compounds. Researchers have noted that for cannabis "this include brain changes that are thought to impair cognitive functioning, particularly in adolescents".

== See also ==
- Recreational drug use
- Cannabis smoking
- Tobacco smoking
- Cardboard
