= Billy Corben =

American film director (born 1978)

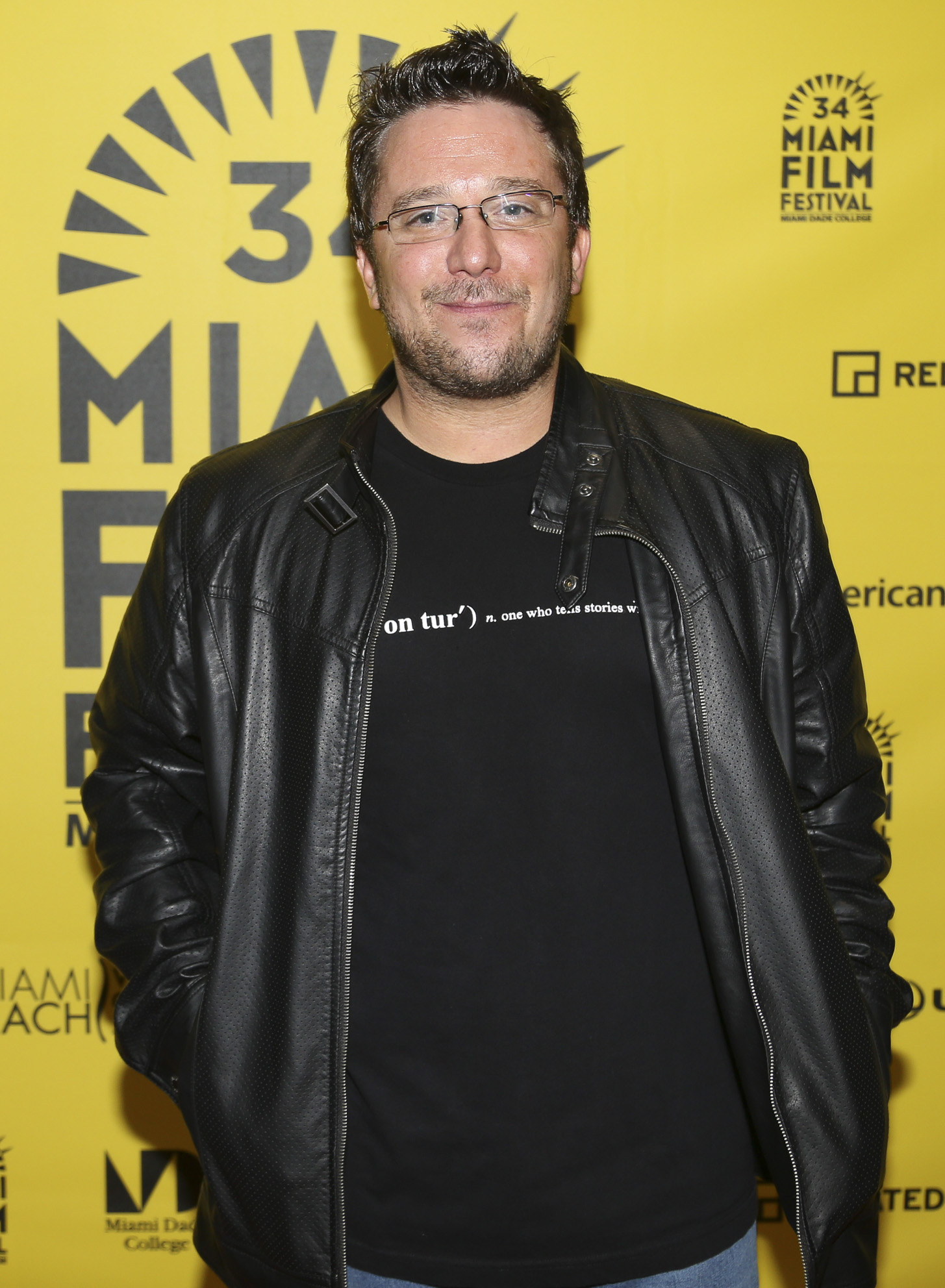
- Corben in March 2017
- Born: William Cohen; 1978 (age 47–48); Fort Myers, Florida, U.S.
- Occupations: Documentarian, Filmmaker
- Years active: 2001–present
- Known for: Cocaine Cowboys, Dawg Fight, and The U
- Spouse: Meghan Christine Perkins

William Cohen (born 1978), better known by the stage name Billy Corben, is an American documentary film director. Along with producing partner Alfred Spellman, he is co-founder of the Miami-based studio Rakontur, which has created films such as Cocaine Cowboys, Dawg Fight, The U, and The U Part 2.

== Early life and education ==
Corben was born in Fort Myers, Florida, to a Jewish family, and was raised in South Florida. As a child actor, he spent a large portion of his early days in Los Angeles. He attended New World School of the Arts for high school, and then the University of Miami, where he majored in political science, screenwriting, and theater and graduated with honors.

== Career ==
Corben's feature documentary directorial debut, Raw Deal: A Question of Consent, premiered at the Sundance Film Festival in 2001, making him one of the youngest directors in Sundance history. Examining the alleged rape of an exotic dancer at a fraternity house at the University of Florida, the film utilized extensive clips from videotape footage of the alleged assault. Anthony Miele of Film Threat said of Raw Deal, "Billy Corben has stumbled onto one of the most controversial films of the modern day," calling it "one of the most compelling pieces of non-fiction ever produced." The film was acquired by Artisan Entertainment for $100,000 with plans for an August 2001 release, though its release was postponed over various issues. Ultimately the filmmakers reacquired the rights and released the film themselves on DVD.

Following Raw Deal, Corben and producing partner Alfred Spellman founded Rakontur, a Miami Beach-based content creation company, where they created Cocaine Cowboys. The New York Times called Cocaine Cowboys "a hyperventilating account of the blood-drenched Miami drug culture in the 1970s and 1980s.” The film tells the story of how the drug trade built Miami through firsthand accounts of some of the most successful smugglers of the era and the deadliest hitman of the cocaine wars.

After a limited theatrical release in 2006, Cocaine Cowboys became the highest-rated documentary ever on the Showtime cable network. The sequel, Cocaine Cowboys 2: Hustling with the Godmother, was released in 2008.

The U, a feature documentary about the championship history of the University of Miami football program, produced by rakontur for ESPN's 30 for 30 series, became the highest-rated documentary in the network's 30-year history, when it debuted on December 12, 2009 following the Heisman Trophy presentation.

In March 2011, he directed Square Grouper: The Godfathers of Ganja, a documentary examining the free-wheeling pot smuggling era of South Florida in the 1970s, which premiered at the South By Southwest Film Festival. In April 2011, he directed Limelight about the rise and fall of Peter Gatien, New York City's biggest nightclub owner, which premiered at Tribeca Film Festival in September 2011.

In 2012, Corben produced Dawg Fight, a brutal exposé on underground backyard MMA fighting in one of Miami's toughest neighborhoods. Cocaine Cowboys: The Kings of Miami, about the sensational Miami-based federal trials of Sal Magluta and Willy Falcon, the most successful Cuban drug traffickers in history and Broke, a feature documentary project for ESPN examining the explosion of big money in sports and the epidemic of professional athletes who have gone broke.

In 2019, he co-wrote Confessions of a Cocaine Cowboy alongside journalist and television writer Aurin Squire. Confessions of a Cocaine Cowboy was a world-premiere documentary theatre piece commissioned by Miami New Drama at the Colony Theatre based on Corben's Cocaine Cowboys documentaries. The play used text from depositions, newspaper articles, and other found documents from the time. It ran at the Colony Theatre from March 7 to April 7, 2019.

=== Other ===
Corben oversees the soundtracks for all of Rakontur's productions, assembling the artists for each project and working hands-on throughout the music production process. For Cocaine Cowboys, Grammy-winner Jan Hammer from Miami Vice composed and performed the original score. Hip-hop artist Luther Campbell performed the opening titles song for The U, Miami music fixture DJ Le Spam wrote his first ever film score for Square Grouper. On Limelight, Corben consulted with Grammy-winning electronic music pioneer Moby and the documentary's original score was written by Fast of the Fun Lovin' Criminals. In addition, Corben has contributed his own original songs to the soundtracks of Raw Deal: A Question of Consent, The U and Square Grouper.

Corben also serves as film critic on The Paul and Young Ron Show, a South Florida radio morning show, doing live segments every Friday. Corben and Rakontur are regular supporters of Miami-based Hope For Vision, a not-for-profit organization that donates money to fund scientific research to develop cures for blindness; the Borscht Film Festival, a group that supports and showcases Miami's independent filmmakers; and The 200 Club, an organization that gives financial support to the families of law enforcement officers and fire fighters who have lost their lives in the line of duty.

== Personal life ==
Corben resides in Miami, Florida.

== Filmography ==
=== Director ===
- Raw Deal: A Question of Consent (2001)
- Cocaine Cowboys (2006)
- Cocaine Cowboys 2: Hustlin With The Godmother (2008)
- Clubland (2008)
- The U (2009)
- Square Grouper (2011)
- Limelight
- Broke (2012)
- Collision Course (2013)
- The Tanning of America: One Nation Under Hip Hop (2014)
- Cocaine Cowboys Reloaded (2014)
- The U Part 2 (2014)
- Dawg Fight (2015)
- Miami Beach 100 (2015)
- Magic City Hustle (2019)
- Screwball (2019)
- 537 Votes (2020)
- Cocaine Cowboys: The Kings of Miami (2021)
- God Forbid: The Sex Scandal That Brought Down a Dynasty (2022)
- From Russia With Lev (2024)
- Men of War (with Jen Gatien) (2024)

=== Actor ===
- Dear John (TV series) (1988–1992)
- Parenthood (1989)
- The Fanelli Boys (1990)
- Archie: To Riverdale and Back Again (TV film) (1990)
- Empty Nest (1990)
- Night Court (1991)
- Shanghai 1920 (1991)
- L.A. Law (TV series) (1992)
- Stepmonster (direct-to-video film) (1993)

=== Self ===
- Raw Deal: A Question of Consent (documentary) (2001)
- The Scarface Phenomenon (video documentary) (2011)
- Rome Is Burning (TV series) (2011)
