= Dawg Fight =

Mixed martial arts documentary

- Directed by: Billy Corben
- Produced by: Alfred Spellman
- Starring: Dhaffir Harris
- Production company: Rakontur
- Release date: March 12, 2015 (Miami)
- Country: United States
- Language: English

Dawg Fight is a documentary film directed by Billy Corben about the mixed martial arts career and personal life of Bellator MMA fighter Dhaffir Harris aka Dada 5000. The documentary is critically acclaimed for its sobering account of the brutal sport no holds barred fighting and bareknuckle fighting. It was also the last film appearance of Kimbo Slice before his death in 2016.

== Reception ==
The film received positive responses from critics.
