= Epitestosterone =

Names
- IUPAC name 17α-Hydroxyandrost-4-en-3-one
- Systematic IUPAC name (1R,3aS,3bR,9aR,9bS,11aS)-1-Hydroxy-9a,11a-dimethyl-1,2,3,3a,3b,4,5,8,9,9a,9b,10,11,11a-tetradecahydro-7H-cyclopenta[a]phenanthren-7-one
- Other names Isotestosterone; 17α-Testosterone; Androst-4-en-17α-ol-3-one

Identifiers
CAS Number	481-30-1
3D model (JSmol)	Interactive image
ChEBI	CHEBI:42534
ChEMBL	ChEMBL196228
ChemSpider	9789
DrugBank	DB07768
ECHA InfoCard	100.169.813
PubChem CID	10204
UNII	48L726977Z
CompTox Dashboard (EPA)	DTXSID8022329
- InChI: InChI=1S/C19H28O2/c1-18-9-7-13(20)11-12(18)3-4-14-15-5-6-17(21)19(15,2)10-8-16(14)18/h11,14-17,21H,3-10H2,1-2H3/t14-,15-,16-,17+,18-,19-/m0/s1 Key: MUMGGOZAMZWBJJ-KZYORJDKSA-N
- SMILES: C[C@]12CC[C@H]3[C@H]([C@@H]1CC[C@H]2O)CCC4=CC(=O)CC[C@]34C

Properties
Chemical formula	C_{19}H_{28}O_{2}
Molar mass	288.431 g/mol
- Except where otherwise noted, data are given for materials in their standard state (at 25 °C [77 °F], 100 kPa). verify (what is ?) Infobox references

Epitestosterone, or isotestosterone, also known as 17α-testosterone or as androst-4-en-17α-ol-3-one, is an endogenous steroid and an epimer of the androgen sex hormone testosterone. It is a weak competitive antagonist of the androgen receptor (AR) and a potent 5α-reductase inhibitor.

Structurally, epitestosterone differs from testosterone only in the configuration at the hydroxy-bearing carbon, C17. Epitestosterone is believed to form in a similar way to testosterone; a 1993 study found that around 50% of epitestosterone production in human males can be ascribed to the testis, although the exact pathway of its formation is still the subject of research. It has been shown to accumulate in mammary cyst fluid and in the prostate. Epitestosterone levels are typically highest in young males; however, by adulthood, most healthy males exhibit a testosterone to epitestosterone ratio (T/E ratio) of about 1:1.

== Society and culture ==
=== Detection of athletic doping ===
It has been shown that exogenous administration of testosterone does not affect levels of epitestosterone in the body. As a result, tests to determine the ratio of testosterone to epitestosterone in urine are used to find athletes who are doping. A study of Australian athletes found that the mean T/E ratio in the study was 1.15:1. Another study found that the max T/E ratio for the 95th percentile of athletes was 3.71:1, and the max T/E ratio for the 99th percentile was 5.25:1.

Epitestosterone has not been shown to enhance athletic performance, although administration of epistestosterone can be used to mask a high level of testosterone if the standard T/E ratio test is used. As such, epitestosterone is banned by many sporting authorities as a masking agent for testosterone.

==== Notable cases ====
A 1989 report by a committee of the Australian Senate claimed that "there is hardly a medal winner at the 1980 Moscow Olympics, certainly not a gold medal winner [...] who is not on one sort of drug or another: usually several kinds. The Moscow Games might well have been called the Chemists' Games". A member of the IOC Medical Commission, Manfred Donike, privately ran additional tests with a new technique for identifying abnormal levels of testosterone by measuring its ratio to epitestosterone in urine. Twenty percent of the specimens he tested, including those from sixteen gold medalists would have resulted in disciplinary proceedings had the tests been official. The results of Donike's unofficial tests later convinced the IOC to add his new technique to their testing protocols.

In 1996 the US athlete Mary Decker failed a T/E test with a T/E ratio of greater than 6, the limit in force at the time. She took the case to arbitration, arguing that birth control pills can cause false positives for the test, but the arbitration panel ruled against her.

On September 20, 2007 Floyd Landis was stripped of his title as winner of the Tour de France, and was subjected to a two-year ban from professional racing after a second test showing an elevated T/E ratio. Landis won the 17th stage of the tour; however, tests taken immediately after the stage victory showed a T/E ratio of 11:1, more than double the 4:1 imposed limit (recently lowered from prior limits of 8:1 and 6:1). On August 1, 2006, media reports said that synthetic testosterone had been detected in the A sample, using the carbon isotope ratio test CIR. The presence of synthetic testosterone means that some of the testosterone in Landis's body came from an external source and was not naturally produced by his own system. These results conflict with Landis's public speculation that it was a natural occurrence. Landis originally denied the charges, but in 2010, while Landis admitted to doping during much of his career, but continued to adamantly deny taking testosterone that would have led to the positive test in the 2006 Tour de France.

== See also ==
- 17α-Estradiol (epiestradiol)
