= Cocaine Cowboys: The Kings of Miami =

2021 US television documentary series

- Genre: Documentary; True crime
- Directed by: Billy Corben
- Theme music composer: Pitbull
- Opening theme: Blood Sport
- Composer: Carlos José Alvarez
- Country of origin: United States
- Original language: English
- No. of seasons: 1
- No. of episodes: 6

Production
- Executive producers: David Cypkin; Marie Therese Guirgis; Adam Bardach; Alfred Spellman; Billy Corben
- Cinematography: Randy Valdes; Alexa Harris; Jonathan Franklin
- Editor: David Cypkin
- Running time: 40–50 minutes
- Production company: Rakontur Production

Original release
- Release: August 4, 2021

Cocaine Cowboys: The Kings of Miami is a 2021 six part docuseries chronicling the rise and fall of Miami drug lords Sal Magluta and Willy Falcon. The two were eventually indicted in one of the largest drug cases in United States history, accused of illegally smuggling 75 tons of cocaine into the country. The series is directed by Billy Corben who previously directed three Cocaine Cowboys documentary films, each featuring a different set of criminals associated with the cocaine trade.

== Episodes ==
No.	Title	Original release date
1	"Willy & Sal"	August 4, 2021
2	"75 Tons"	August 4, 2021
3	"Mountain of Evidence"	August 4, 2021
4	"Only in Miami"	August 4, 2021
5	"Femme Fatale"	August 4, 2021
6	"Adios, Muchachos"	August 4, 2021

== Reception ==
On Rotten Tomatoes, the documentary holds an approval rating of 100% based on 7 reviews, with an average rating of 8.3/10.

Richard Roeper of Chicago Sun Times reviewed the series positively, describing the series as "brilliant and wildly entertaining". Brian Tallerico, reviewing the series for RogerEbert.com praised the directorship of Corben saying that he "lets the people involved tell their stories, and he gets amazing ones from all sides of this incredible tale, including criminals, authorities, and even a few of the jurors." On BuzzFeed News, Alessa Dominguez critiqued the show for the way it, and other similar Netflix shows, gloss over the tremendous harm wrought by drug kingpins like Magluta and Falcon writing that the show "highlights the glamour and excess of the Miami drug trade, often losing sight of the bigger picture and the people who suffered the fallout".

=== Awards ===
Cocaine Cowboys: The Kings of Miami won an national Edward R. Murrow Award for Excellence in Video in 2022.
