= 537 Votes =

Documentary directed by Billy Corben

- Directed by: Billy Corben
- Production companies: Hyperobject Industries; HBO Documentary Films
- Distributed by: HBO
- Release dates: October 10, 2020 (GEMS Film Festival); October 21, 2020
- Running time: 109 minutes
- Country: United States
- Language: English

537 Votes is an HBO original documentary directed by Billy Corben and released on October 21, 2020. The documentary discusses the controversial 2000 United States presidential election in Florida and was released in the run-up to the 2020 United States presidential election. The film premiered at the 2020 GEMS Film Festival.

== Background ==
The 2000 United States presidential election came down to the state of Florida, in which the margin between Democratic candidate Al Gore and Republican candidate George W. Bush was incredibly narrow. The election was left un-decided during a controversial series of recounts in Florida, which after being stopped by the Supreme Court of the United States in the case Bush v. Gore, eventually resulted in Bush winning with a margin of 537 votes in the state.

537 Votes focuses particularly on the election in Miami-Dade County, Florida, an important political battleground during the election and at the epicenter of the recount.

== Reception ==
On Rotten Tomatoes it has a 100% approval rating based on reviews from 8 critics, with an average rating of 7.40/10. In the Chicago Sun-Times, reviewer Richard Roeper gave the documentary a positive review, writing that it "does a brilliant job of laying out the facts, providing invaluable background on late 20th century politics in [Miami-Dade County]" and praising its inclusion of interviews with reporters and political operatives, as well as its use of archival footage.

Writing for CNN, Brian Lowry notes that the film was released shortly before the 2020 United States presidential election, where similar concerns existed. Lowry writes that the documentary "provides a contextual, nuanced view", and notes that the primary message of the documentary is that while Gore's representative focused on "decorum and democracy", Republicans won the election, and that Democrats "brought the equivalent of a strongly worded letter to a knife fight".
