= The U (film) =

- 2009 promotional poster
- Directed by: Billy Corben
- Country of origin: United States
- Original language: English

Production
- Running time: 80 minutes
- Production company: Rakontur

Original release
- Network: ESPN
- Release: December 12, 2009

The U is a 2009 documentary film about the University of Miami's football program produced by Miami-based media studio Rakontur and directed by Billy Corben.

The film premiered December 12, 2009 after the Heisman Trophy presentation on ESPN as a part of their 30 for 30 documentary series. The U's premiere drew 2.3 million viewers, the most ever for a documentary on the sports cable network until the debut of Pony Excess, a documentary about the Southern Methodist University football scandal in the 1980s.

== Release ==
This film was released on DVD in 2010, both separately and as part of the 30 for 30 box set. The DVD cover, depicting Michael Irvin, originally had the "U" logo on his helmet, but it was airbrushed from the cover after the University of Miami objected to the logo's use. Excerpts from Florida State University's "Seminole Rap" video that initially appeared in the documentary were also cut from the DVD release.

== Sequel: The U Part 2 ==
In December 2014, ESPN released The U Part 2, a sequel to The U. The sequel was also a 30 for 30 film. The sequel documents the second rise to glory of the University of Miami in the late 1990s and early 2000s, culminating in its fifth national championship in 2001 followed again by major setbacks to the program, including the 2011 scandal involving rogue booster Nevin Shapiro.

== See also ==
- List of American football films
