= Cocaine Cowboys (2006 film) =

2006 documentary film

- Directed by: Billy Corben
- Produced by: Alfred Spellman; Billy Corben; David Cypkin
- Starring: Jon Roberts; Mickey Munday; Jorge "Rivi" Ayala
- Cinematography: Armando Salas
- Edited by: Billy Corben; David Cypkin
- Music by: Jan Hammer
- Distributed by: Magnolia Pictures
- Release dates: April 26, 2006 (Tribeca Film Festival); October 27, 2006 (United States)
- Running time: 116 minutes
- Country: United States
- Language: English

Cocaine Cowboys is a 2006 documentary film directed by Billy Corben and produced by Alfred Spellman and Billy Corben through their Miami-based media studio Rakontur. The film explores the rise of cocaine dealer Jon Roberts, described by prosecutors as "The Medellin Cartel's American representative". The film chronicles his role in the Miami drug war (the resulting crime epidemic that swept the American city of Miami, Florida, in the 1970s and 1980s). The producers of Cocaine Cowboys use interviews with law enforcement, journalists, lawyers, former drug smugglers, and gang members to provide a first-hand perspective of the Miami drug war.

== Synopsis ==
Cocaine Cowboys chronicles the development of the illegal drug trade in Miami during the 1970s and 1980s with interviews of both law enforcement and organized crime leaders, in addition to news footage from the era. The film reveals that in the 1960s and early 1970s, marijuana was the primary imported drug into the region. During the 1970s, marijuana imports were replaced by the much more lucrative cocaine imports; as more cocaine was smuggled into the United States, the price dropped, allowing it to turn "blue collar" and become accessible to a wider market.

Drug smugglers reveal several of the different methods used to smuggle the drug into Florida. The primary methods of transport were aircraft or boats. The drug smugglers also reveal the complexity of their smuggling methods. The logistics involved included the purchase and financing of legitimate businesses to provide cover for illegal operations, the use of sophisticated electronic homing devices, and other elaborate transportation schemes.

The film also addresses the difficulty importers sometimes had storing all the money they made, as a result of which they set up a relationship with Manuel Noriega in Panama and also bought up entire neighborhoods of houses, putting money into infrastructure as well as investing in side projects such as racehorses.

The distribution networks were also highly elaborate, and many people were involved locally and nationally in the consumption of the imported cocaine. Importers reveal that condominiums were purchased near particular ocean waterways to provide a monitoring post for U.S. Coast Guard and local police patrol boats, and high-tech radio equipment were used to monitor the radio frequencies of federal, state, and local authorities in order to warn incoming boats and airplanes.

The film reveals that much of the economic growth that took place in Miami during this period was a benefit of the drug trade. As members of the drug trade made immense amounts of money, this money flowed in large amounts into legitimate businesses. Consequently, drug money indirectly financed the construction of many of the modern high-rise buildings in southern Florida. Later, when law enforcement pressure drove many major players out of the picture, numerous high-end stores and businesses closed because of plummeting sales.

Also documented in the film is the gangland violence associated with the trade. The interviewees in the film argue that Griselda Blanco, an infamous crime family matriarch, played a major role in the history of the drug trade in Miami and other cities across America. It was the lawless and corrupt atmosphere, primarily from Blanco's operations, that led to the gangsters being dubbed the "Cocaine Cowboys".

== Release ==
The film premiered at the Tribeca Film Festival in April 2006, and distribution rights to the film in English-speaking territories were licensed to Magnolia Pictures. The film opened in U.S. theaters with a limited release on October 27, 2006. Czech-American musician Jan Hammer of Miami Vice fame composed and performed the film's original score.

== Related media ==
The film began appearing on Showtime on December 7, 2007.

A revised and extended version of the film, titled Cocaine Cowboys: Reloaded, was released on DVD in April 2014.

According to an interview with Billy Corben in 2021, the documentary was originally to be called "City Made of Snow", and it was to include an interview with Miguel Perez, a marielito who had attempted to kill a Colombian drug dealer, Papo Mejia, in the Miami airport with a bayonet, and worked with hitman Jorge "Rivi" Ayala.

== See also ==
- Cocaine Cowboys 2
- Cocaine Cowboys: The Kings of Miami
- Mariel boatlift
- Barry Seal
- War on drugs
