= Joint (cannabis) =

Cannabis cigarette, contains marijuana or hashish

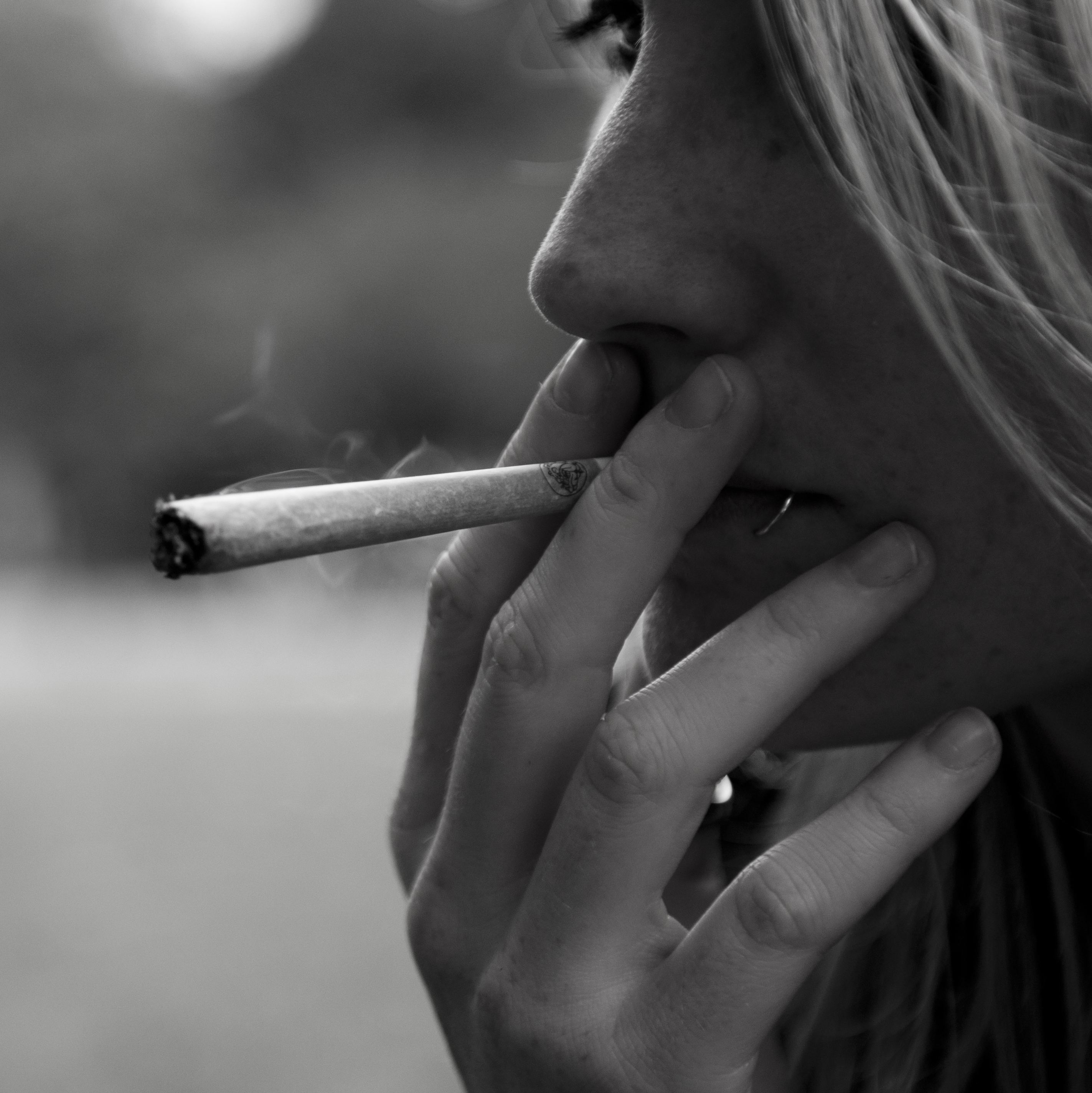
Woman smoking a joint

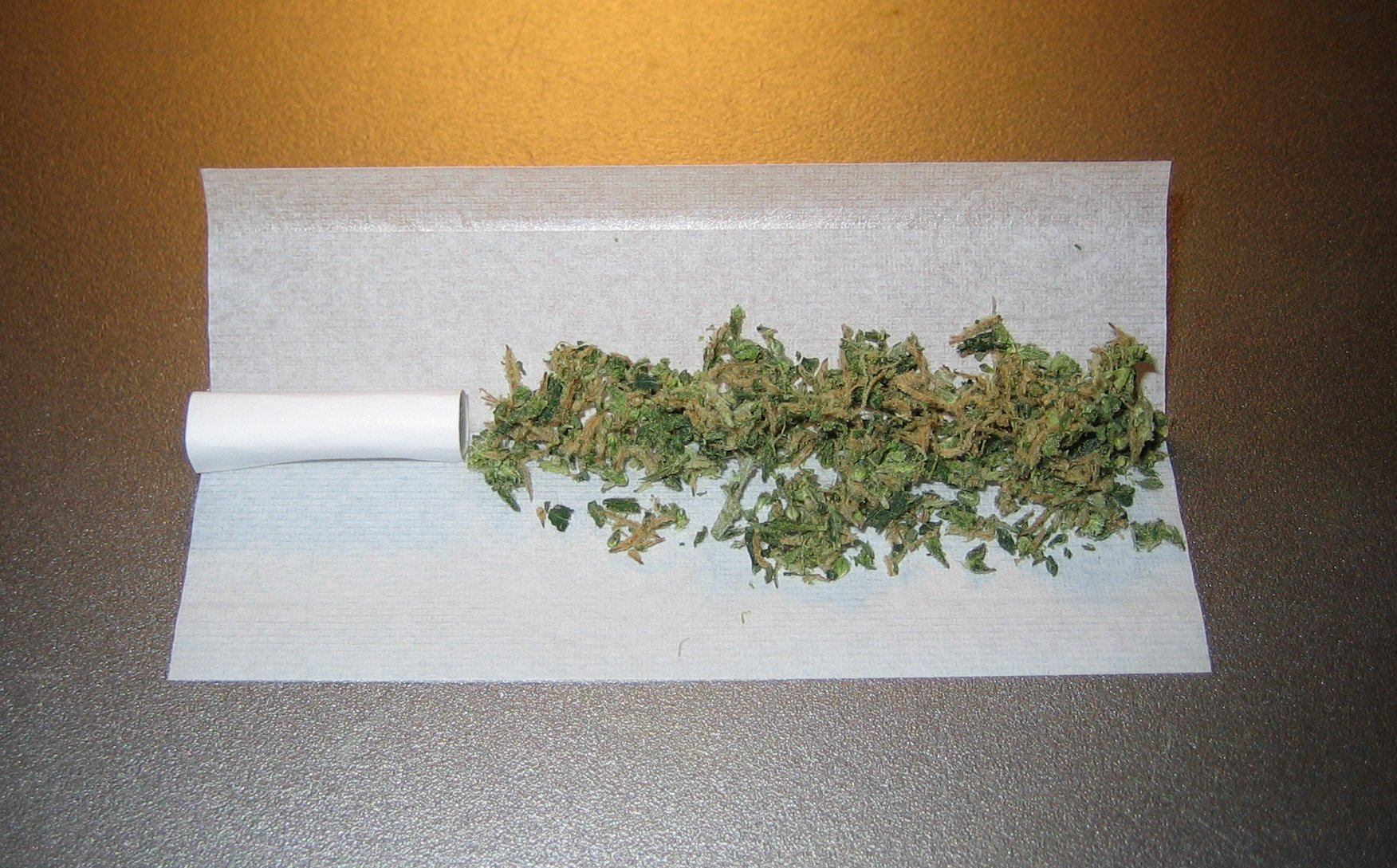
A joint prior to rolling, with a paper filter at left

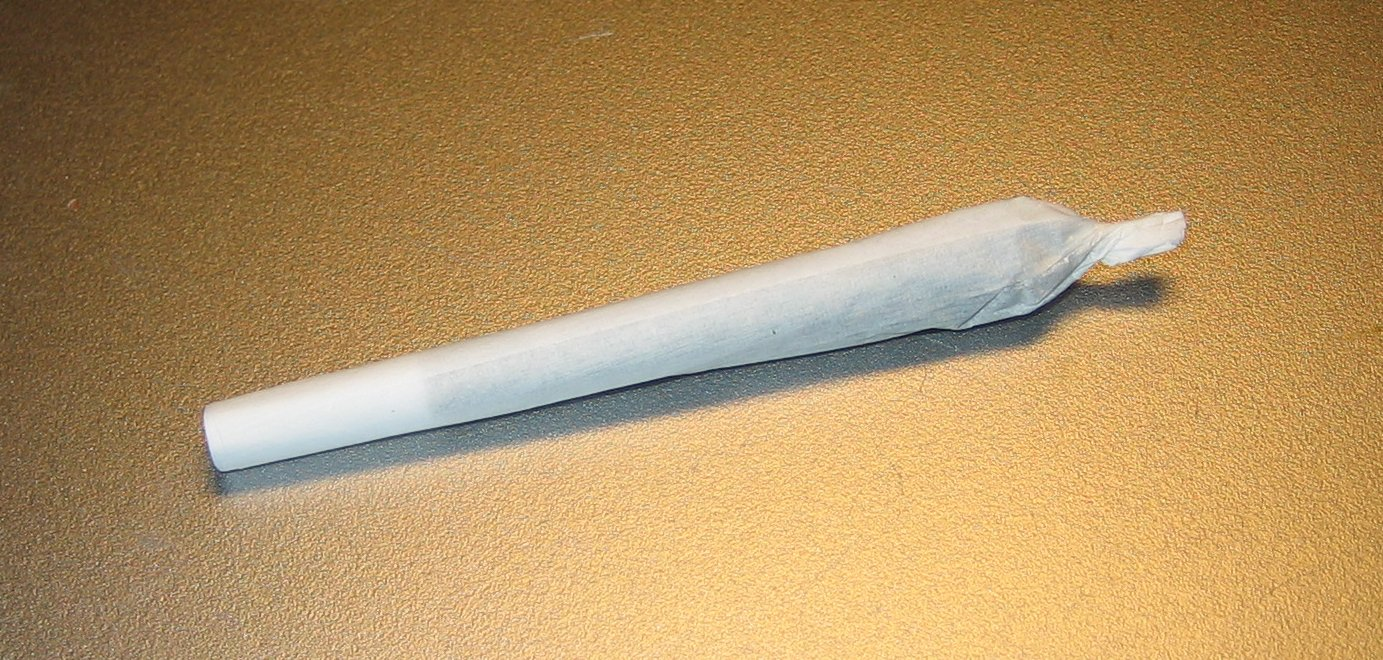
A joint after rolling, with a paper filter at left

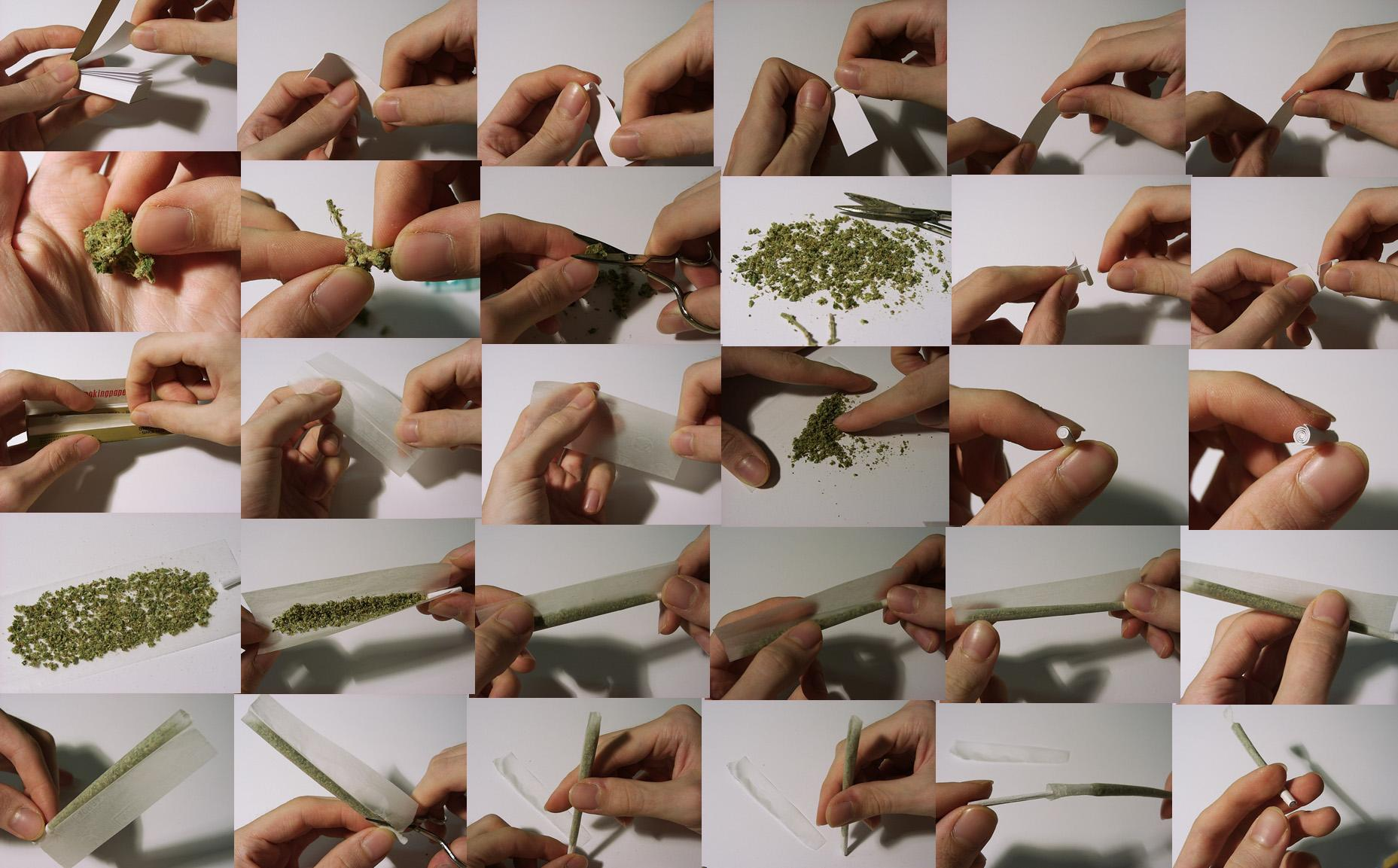
Rolling a spliff

A joint is a rolled cannabis cigarette. Unlike commercial tobacco cigarettes, the user ordinarily hand-rolls joints with rolling papers, though in some cases they are machine-rolled. Rolling papers are the most common rolling medium in industrialized countries; however, brown paper, cigarettes or beedies with the tobacco removed, receipts and paper napkin can also be used, particularly in developing countries. Modern papers are manufactured in a range of sizes from a wide variety of materials including rice, hemp, and flax, and are also available in liquorice and other flavored varieties.

Joint size can vary, typically containing between 0.25 and 1 g (1/112 and 1/28 oz) net weight of cannabis, but can sometimes far exceed this. Tobacco is sometimes used in the rolling process. Like smoking tobacco, smoking cannabis has been shown to be harmful to the health of the smoker, and may also be harmful to others through passive smoking.

Although joints by definition contain cannabis, regional differences exist.

Special vaporizers, made to look like joints, have also been designed for use with cannabis extract.

== Spliff ==
A spliff is a joint rolled with some tobacco. 'Spliff' is a West Indian word of Jamaican English origin which has spread to several western countries, particularly the UK and Europe. Its precise etymology is unknown, but it is attested as early as 1936.

The term "spliff" is sometimes used to distinguish a joint prepared with both cannabis and tobacco, as is commonly done in European countries, where joints containing only cannabis are uncommon. This originates from the only type of cannabis historically available in Europe was imported hashish. This type of cannabis has a play dough consistency and is therefore either made to be smoked in a pipe or to be mixed with tobacco if rolled into a joint. A hashish joint would be physically impossible to actually smoke without tobacco. In the West Indies where this term originated (especially Jamaica), a spliff is simply a marijuana cigarette, normally containing a very small amount of tobacco, called grabba, which is chopped up on a board with a knife.

In Europe, in certain Commonwealth nations, and more recently in North America, joints, or spliffs, typically include a cigarette filter or a bit of rolled thin cardboard in one end to serve as a mouthpiece, commonly referred to as the crutch, filter, or roach.

== Roach clips ==
Small metal clips to facilitate the smoking of a "roach" are called "roach clips". In the UK the term roach is commonly used to describe the cardboard mouthpiece. Roach clips cover a wide variety of paraphernalia including custom-made roach clip jewelry from brass brazing rod, alligator clips, forceps, needle nose pliers, hemostats, ceramic pieces with holes through them, and tweezers.

== Etymology ==
The word joint ultimately originated from French, where it is an adjective meaning 'joined' (past participle of the verb joindre), derived in turn from Latin iunctus, past participle of iungere ('join'/'bind'/'yoke'). By 1821, 'joint' had become an Anglo-Irish term for an annexe, or a side-room 'joined' to a main room. By 1877, this had developed into U.S. slang for a 'place, building, establishment,' and especially to an opium den. Its first usage in the sense of 'marijuana cigarette' is dated to 1938.

Many slang terms are synonymous with the word joint. There is also a myth that, because it is smoked within a joint circle of friends, it is known as a 'joint'. 'J' or 'jay' can be used as an abbreviation for a generic joint. Another frequently used term is 'doobie.' The end or butt of a mostly smoked joint is referred to as a "roach" in U.S. and Australian slang.

== See also ==
- Blunt (cannabis)
- Herb grinder, used to prepare cannabis for rolling into a joint
- Cannabis smoking
- Hash, Marihuana & Hemp Museum
- Medical cannabis
- Recreational drug use
- Vaporizer (inhalation device)
