= List of Generation Kill characters =

Generation Kill follows United States Marines of the 1st Recon Battalion through the first four weeks of the 2003 invasion of Iraq. The characters are drawn from this group of Marines.

== 1st Marine Division ==
The recurring characters are part of the 1st Marine Division. The division is under the command of Major General James "Maddog" Mattis, played by Robert Burke. His callsign is "Chaos".

=== 1st Marine Regiment ===
Also known as Regimental Combat Team 1, or RCT 1, the 1st Marine Regiment is commanded by Colonel Joe D. Dowdy and portrayed by actor Wayne Harrison.

=== 1st Recon Battalion ===
Nearly all of the recurring characters are members of 1st Reconnaissance Battalion (1st Recon), commanded by Lieutenant Colonel Stephen "Godfather" Ferrando (played by Chance Kelly). His command staff include Major Todd Eckloff played by Benjamin Busch and Sergeant Major John Sixta, played by Neal Jones. Nabil Elouahabi plays the battalion's translator, "Meesh." The battalion surgeon, Lieutenant Alex Aubin (Andrew Spicer) also appears.

Character	Position	Actor
Lieutenant Colonel Stephen "Godfather" Ferrando	Battalion Commander	Chance Kelly
Major Todd Eckloff	Battalion Executive Officer	Benjamin Busch
Sergeant Major John Sixta (referred to twice as "Mr. Potato Head")	Battalion Sergeant Major	Neal Jones
"Meesh"	Battalion Translator	Nabil Elouahabi
Lieutenant Alex Aubin, USN	Battalion Surgeon	Andrew Spicer
Sergeant Christopher Wasik	Battalion Driver	Daniel Janks

==== Alpha Company ====
Alpha Company is commanded by Captain Bryan Patterson played by Michael Kelly. The company operations chief, Gunnery Sergeant Rich Barret, is played by Eric Kocher, a team leader in Bravo's third platoon during the invasion; Kocher is played by Owain Yeoman. The company callsign is "Assassin".

Character	Position	Actor
Captain Bryan Patterson	Company Commander	Michael Kelly
Gunnery Sergeant Rich Barrett	Company Operations Chief	Eric Kocher

Character	Position	Actor
Sergeant Damon Fawcett	Team 2-3, Team Leader	Theo Landey
Corporal John Burris	Team 2-3, Driver	Kyle Siebert
Corporal Smith	Team 2-3	Jeffrey John Carisalez
Corporal Cody Scott	Team 2-3, Gunner	Darron Meyer

==== Bravo Company ====
Bravo Company is commanded by Captain Craig Schwetje played by Brian Wade. The company callsign is "Hitman". Schwetje is nicknamed "Encino Man" when out of earshot, a reference to the titular character from the film of the same name. This is meant to invoke stupidity and incompetence.

Character	Position	Actor
Captain Craig "Encino Man" Schwetje	Company Commander	Brian Wade
Gunnery Sergeant Ray "Casey Kasem" Griego	Company Operations Chief	David Barrera

===== 2nd Platoon =====
Team	Vehicle	Character	Position	Vehicle position	Actor
Team 1	V-01	Sergeant Brad "Iceman" Colbert	Team 1, Team Leader/Squad Leader of Bravo 1	Truck Commander	Alexander Skarsgård
Team 1	V-01	Corporal Josh Ray Person	Team 1, RTO (Receiver/Transmitter Operator)	Driver	James Ransone
Team 1	V-01	Lance Corporal Harold James Trombley		Driver Rear	Billy Lush
Team 1	V-01	Corporal Walt Hasser		Turret position	Pawel Szajda
Team 1	V-01	Evan "Rolling Stone" Wright	Civilian journalist embedded with Team 1	Passenger Rear	Lee Tergesen
Team 1	V-02	Sergeant Antonio "Poke" Espera	Team 1, Assistant Team Leader/Squad Leader of Bravo 1	Passenger	Jon Huertas
Team 1	V-02	Corporal Jason Lilley		Driver	Kellan Lutz
Team 1	V-02	Corporal Nathan Christopher		Passenger rear	Stefan Otto
Team 1	V-02	Corporal Hector Leon		Driver rear	Sal Alvarez
Team 1	V-02	Corporal Gabriel "Gabe" Garza		Turret position	Rey Valentin
Team 2	V-03	Staff Sergeant Larry Shawn "Pappy" Patrick	Team 2, Team Leader/Platoon Scout Sniper	Passenger	Josh Barrett
Team 2	V-03	Sergeant Rodolfo "Fruity Rudy" Reyes		Driver	himself
Team 2	V-03	Corporal James Chaffin		Driver rear	Eric Ladin
Team 2	V-03	Sergeant Michael "Budweiser" Brunmeier		Passenger rear	Justin Shaw
Team 2	V-03	Corporal Anthony "Manimal" Jacks		Turret position	Rich McDonald
Team 2	V-04 (Command Vehicle)	First Lieutenant Nathaniel "Nate" Fick	Platoon Commander	Passenger	Stark Sands
Team 2	V-04 (Command Vehicle)	Gunnery Sergeant Mike "Gunny" Wynn	Platoon Gunnery Sergeant, Command vehicle	Driver	Marc Menchaca
Team 2	V-04 (Command Vehicle)	Corporal Evan "Q-Tip" Stafford		Passenger rear	Wilson Bethel
Team 2	V-04 (Command Vehicle)	Private First Class John Christeson		Driver rear	Daniel Fox
Team 3	V-05	Sergeant Steven Lovell	Team 3, Team Leader	Passenger	Langley Kirkwood
Team 3	V-05	Sergeant Leandro "Shady B" Baptista		Driver	Mike Figueroa
Team 3	V-05	Hospital Corpsman 2nd Class Robert Timothy "Doc" Bryan, USN	Platoon Medical Support	Passenger rear	Jonah Lotan
Team 3	V-05	Corporal Teren "T" Holsey		Driver rear	Sydney Hall
Team 3	V-05	Corporal Michael Stinetorf		Turret position	Bjorn Steinbach

===== 3rd Platoon =====
Vehicle	Character	Role	Vehicle Position	Actor
Command vehicle	Captain Dave "Captain America" McGraw	Platoon Commander	Passenger	Eric Nenninger
Command vehicle	Sergeant Eric Kocher	Team 2, Team Leader	Passenger	Owain Yeoman
Command vehicle	Corporal Jeffrey "Dirty Earl" Carisalez		Driver	J. Salome Martinez
Command vehicle	Corporal Daniel Redman		Turret Position	Sean Brosnan

==== Charlie Company ====
1st Recon Battalion's third rifle company. Members are featured in a short scene in Episode 4: "Combat Jack", but no Marines are specifically named. The company commander's call sign is "Raptor".

==== Delta Company ====
Company of USMC reservists attached to 1st Recon Battalion. Members are featured in Episode 6: "Stay Frosty", but only one Staff Non-commissioned officer who has an acquaintance with 2nd platoon of Bravo Company is named.

Character	Role	Actor
Gunnery Sergeant Jason Swarr	Battalion Parachute Rigger	Michael Mosley
