= United States Ambassador-at-Large for Cyberspace and Digital Policy =

U.S. diplomatic position

Ambassador-at-Large of the United States for Cyberspace and Digital Policy
- Seal of the United States Department of State

- Incumbent; Adam Cassady since August 7, 2026
- United States Department of State
- Reports to: Under Secretary of State for Economic Affairs
- Nominator: President of the United States
- Term length: No fixed term
- Inaugural holder: Nathaniel C. Fick
- Formation: 2022
- Website: Bureau of Cyberspace and Digital Policy

The United States ambassador-at-large for cyberspace and digital policy is the head of the Bureau of Cyberspace and Digital Policy at the U.S. Department of State. The ambassador-at-large effectively serves as the U.S. government's "cyber ambassador."

== History ==
The State Department established the Bureau of Cyberspace and Digital Policy (CDP) in April 2022 to consolidate cyber and digital-policy responsibilities that had previously been divided among several offices. In December 2022, Congress subsequently provided a statutory basis for the bureau in section 9502 of the James M. Inhofe National Defense Authorization Act for Fiscal Year 2023, which amended the State Department Basic Authorities Act of 1956. The law required that its head hold the rank and status of ambassador and be appointed by the president with the advice and consent of the Senate.

CDP formally began operations on April 4, 2022, with career diplomat Jennifer Bachus initially leading the bureau.

Nathaniel C. Fick was confirmed by the United States Senate on September 15, 2022, as the inaugural ambassador-at-large for cyberspace and digital policy.

In March 2026, President Donald Trump nominated Adam Cassady to serve in his administration as ambassador-at-large for cyberspace and digital policy. The U.S. Senate confirmed Cassady on August 7, 2026 by a vote of 51 to 47.

== List of ambassadors-at-large ==
#	Image	Name	Appointment	Left office	President served under
1		Nathaniel Fick	September 21, 2022	January 20, 2025	Joe Biden
-		Jennifer Bachus (Acting)	January 20, 2025	July 23, 2025	Donald Trump
-		Russ Headlee (Acting)	July 23, 2025	August 7, 2026	Donald Trump
2		Adam Cassady	August 7, 2026	Present	Donald Trump

== See also ==
- Ambassador-at-large
- Cyber diplomacy
- Cybersecurity and Infrastructure Security Agency
- Digital diplomacy
- Internet governance
- Office of the National Cyber Director
- United States Cyber Command
