= Bureau of Cyberspace and Digital Policy =

U.S. State Department bureau responsible for cyber diplomacy

- Seal of the United States Department of State

Bureau overview
- Formed: April 4, 2022; 4 years ago
- Jurisdiction: Federal government of the United States
- Headquarters: Harry S Truman Building, Washington, D.C., U.S.
- Bureau executive: Adam Cassady, Ambassador At-Large
- Parent Bureau: United States Department of State
- Website: www.state.gov/bureaus-offices/under-secretary-for-economic-affairs/bureau-of-cyberspace-and-digital-policy

The Bureau of Cyberspace and Digital Policy (CDP) is a bureau of the United States Department of State responsible for United States diplomacy relating to cyberspace, digital technologies, telecommunications, and critical and emerging technologies. Its responsibilities include international cybersecurity policy, data flows, internet governance, communications infrastructure, technology standards, digital freedom, and coordination with other federal agencies and foreign governments. The bureau is placed under the State Department's Under Secretary for Economic Affairs.

The State Department established CDP in April 2022 to consolidate cyber and digital-policy responsibilities that had previously been divided among several offices. Congress subsequently provided a statutory basis for the bureau in the James M. Inhofe National Defense Authorization Act for Fiscal Year 2023, which was enacted in December 2022.

A State Department reorganization in 2025 moved CDP from the Office of the Deputy Secretary to the department's economic-affairs hierarchy and transferred or eliminated parts of its original cybersecurity and digital-freedom portfolio. The bureau continued to operate after the restructuring, with Russ Headlee serving as its senior bureau official.

== History ==
=== Establishment ===
Before CDP was established, several State Department entities shared responsibility for international cyber diplomacy. The Government Accountability Office found that consolidating those responsibilities in CDP elevated cyber issues within the department, increased awareness of them, and enabled engagement with higher-ranking foreign government officials. GAO also found that the bureau continued to face challenges, including the need to clarify its responsibilities in relation to other State Department components.

Secretary of State Antony Blinken announced plans for a dedicated cyberspace and digital-policy bureau in October 2021. CDP formally began operations on April 4, 2022, with career diplomat Jennifer Bachus initially leading the bureau.

At its launch, the bureau included three principal policy offices:

- International Cyberspace Security;
- International Information and Communications Policy; and
- Digital Freedom.

Nathaniel Fick was confirmed by the United States Senate on September 15, 2022, as the inaugural Ambassador-at-Large for Cyberspace and Digital Policy.

Congress gave the bureau a statutory foundation through section 9502 of the James M. Inhofe National Defense Authorization Act for Fiscal Year 2023, which amended the State Department Basic Authorities Act of 1956. The law established the Bureau of Cyberspace and Digital Policy and required that its head hold the rank and status of ambassador and be appointed by the president with the advice and consent of the Senate.

An earlier proposal, the Cyber Diplomacy Act of 2021, passed the House of Representatives in April 2021 but was not enacted.

=== Development under Fick ===
Under Fick, the bureau expanded diplomatic engagement with foreign governments, international organizations, technology companies, and civil-society groups. Its work included bilateral cyber dialogues, negotiations concerning international cyber norms and technology standards, support for countries responding to cyberattacks, and participation in multilateral organizations concerned with internet governance and telecommunications.

In May 2024, the State Department released the United States International Cyberspace and Digital Policy Strategy. The strategy adopted an approach described by the department as “digital solidarity”, under which the United States would work with other governments, companies, and civil-society organizations to develop secure and resilient digital infrastructure while supporting an open and interoperable internet.

The bureau also developed foreign-assistance programs intended to improve the cybersecurity and digital infrastructure of partner countries. In September 2024, The Record reported that CDP was preparing almost $35 million in projects involving incident response, secure cloud infrastructure, undersea cables, counter-spyware efforts, and cybersecurity training. According to the report, the bureau's available foreign-assistance accounts had increased from approximately $17 million to more than $90 million.

Fick left office in January 2025, after which Bachus again led the bureau in an acting capacity.

=== 2025 reorganization ===
In April 2025, Secretary of State Marco Rubio announced a department-wide reorganization that moved CDP from the Office of the Deputy Secretary to the portfolio then headed by the Under Secretary for Economic Growth, Energy, and the Environment. The change was part of a broader restructuring of the department that included the elimination or consolidation of numerous offices.

In April 2025, the Government Accountability Office told Congress that CDP had become central to the State Department's international cyber efforts but continued to face organizational challenges involving staffing, expertise, coordination, and the clarification of responsibilities.

In July 2025, Cybersecurity Dive reported that between nine and eleven CDP employees had been dismissed and that Bachus had been removed as acting head and reassigned. According to the report:

- the International Cyberspace Security division was transferred to the newly created Bureau of Emerging Threats;
- the Strategy, Programs, and Communications office was divided, with its foreign-assistance program remaining in CDP while its strategy and communications personnel were transferred to the under secretary's staff;
- the Office of the Coordinator for Digital Freedom was effectively closed, with many of its employees transferred to the public-diplomacy hierarchy; and
- the remaining CDP consisted primarily of a reduced Strategy, Programs, and Communications office and the International Information and Communications Policy division.

Former government cyber officials and other specialists criticized the division of the bureau's responsibilities. Former State Department cyber coordinator Chris Painter argued that separating cybersecurity, digital-policy, and foreign-assistance personnel could result in less coordinated policy and make international responses to cyber incidents more difficult. The State Department said the broader reorganization was intended to make the department more accountable and eliminate offices it considered duplicative or outdated.

The bureau nevertheless continued operating after the restructuring. Its public mission subsequently placed greater emphasis on critical and emerging technologies, including artificial intelligence, telecommunications, technology infrastructure, and international technology policy. In May 2026, Headlee represented CDP at the inaugural United States–Association of Southeast Asian Nations Artificial Intelligence Ministerial, which addressed AI infrastructure, adoption, innovation, and governance.

== Responsibilities and organization ==
Federal law designates the head of CDP as the State Department's principal cyberspace-policy official and the secretary of state's adviser on cyberspace and digital issues. The bureau's statutory duties include:

- leading and coordinating the department's international cyberspace and cybersecurity diplomacy;
- addressing data privacy, cross-border data flows, internet governance, and information and communications technology standards;
- coordinating diplomatic aspects of federal cyber strategy with other agencies and the Office of the National Cyber Director;
- promoting secure and interoperable communications infrastructure;
- representing the State Department in federal efforts to develop cyber priorities and deterrence policies;
- engaging companies, civil-society organizations, academic institutions, and other public and private entities;
- coordinating diplomatic responses to major cyber incidents;
- supporting foreign cybersecurity capacity-building efforts;
- promoting international cooperation involving cybercrime, the digital economy, and telecommunications policy; and
- promoting freedom of expression and other human rights online.

Before the 2025 reorganization, the State Department's Foreign Affairs Manual assigned CDP responsibility for international cyberspace security, international information and communications policy, digital freedom, strategy and foreign-assistance programs, and administrative support.

Following the reorganization, reporting indicated that the bureau retained its International Information and Communications Policy division and part of its Strategy, Programs, and Communications office, while other functions were transferred elsewhere in the department.

== Leadership ==
The Senate-confirmed head of the bureau holds the rank of ambassador and uses the title Ambassador-at-Large for Cyberspace and Digital Policy. Nathaniel Fick was the first person confirmed to the position, serving from September 2022 until January 2025.

Following Fick's departure, the ambassador-at-large position remained vacant and the bureau was led by acting or senior career officials. Russ Headlee subsequently became the bureau's senior bureau official.

In March 2026, President Donald Trump nominated Adam Cassady, an official at the National Telecommunications and Information Administration, to succeed Fick. The Senate Foreign Relations Committee advanced the nomination to the full Senate by a vote of 17–5 on April 30, 2026. On August 7, 2026, the Senate confirmed Cassady by a vote of 51–47. He became the second person confirmed to the position, succeeding Nathaniel Fick.

== See also ==
- Cyber diplomacy
- Office of the National Cyber Director
- Internet governance
- Digital diplomacy
- Cybersecurity and Infrastructure Security Agency
- United States Cyber Command
