= Endgame, Inc. =

American security consulting firms

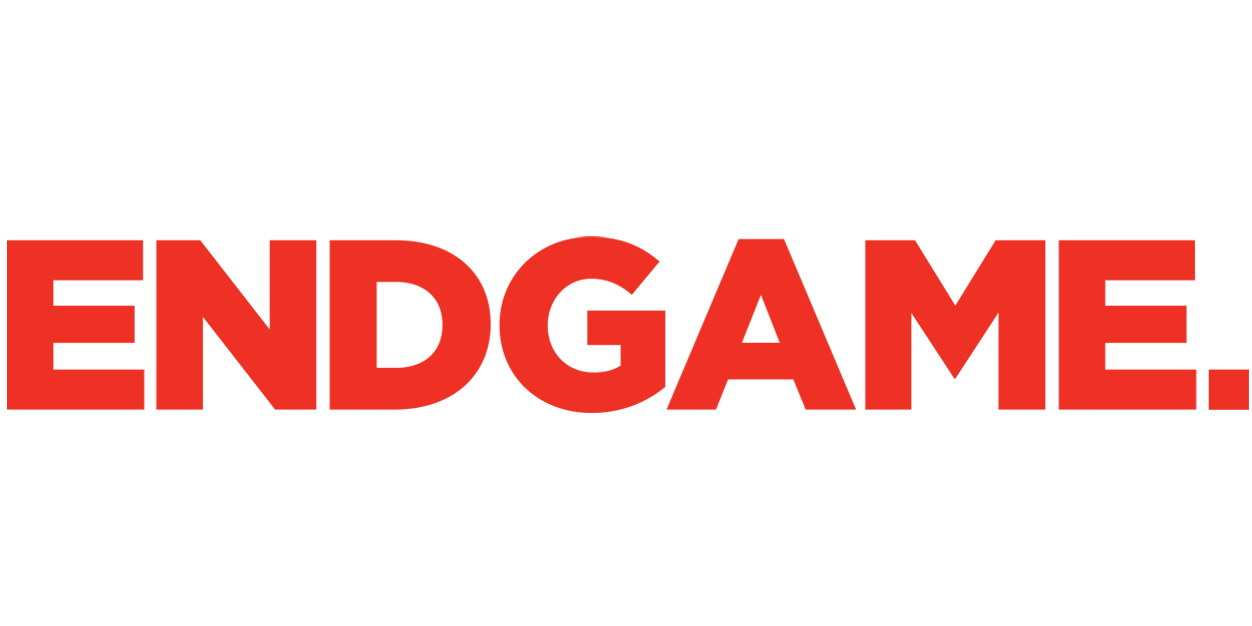
- Industry: Computer software Computer security
- Founded: 2008
- Founder: Christopher J. Rouland, Daniel Ingevaldson, David Miles, Ray Gazaway
- Headquarters: Arlington, Virginia, United States.
- Key people: Nathaniel Fick (CEO)
- Website: http://www.endgame.com/

Endgame provides a cyber operations platform supporting the detection, exploitation, and mitigation of cyber-threats. Endgame was started by executives from ISS (Internet Security Systems).

== History ==
Endgame was started in 2008 by Chris Rouland and other executives who previously worked with the CIA and ISS. In October 2010 it saw an investment of 29 million USD, raised from Bessemer Ventures, Columbia Capital, Kleiner Perkins Caufield & Byers (KPCB), and TechOperators. The company offers commercial web-based malware detection services, defensive digital security intelligence and big data analysis software.

In February 2011, the company announced partnerships with Hewlett-Packard and IBM to use Endgame's IP Reputation Intelligence service within HP's TippingPoint Digital Vaccine service and IBM's managed services offerings. That same month emails sent to HBGary from Endgame were leaked which revealed that the company sold zero-day vulnerabilities. As of 2014 Endgame has moved away from zero-day exploitations to identifying and protecting consumers from potential cyber threats. Endgame now offers its services to companies within the financial services industry and consumer technology companies. Through its software the company collects information from data sources accessed by consumers, identifying potential security threats.

In December 2012, Endgame announced the appointment of Nathaniel Fick as Chief Executive Officer, replacing Chris Rouland. A former Marine and author of bestseller One Bullet Away, Fick was previously CEO of the Center for a New American Security, an independent and nonpartisan national security and defense policy research institution, and remains an operating partner at Bessemer Venture Partners.

In March 2013, Endgame closed a $23 million Series B equity financing with the stated purpose to fund growth in its existing federal customer base as well as expand into the commercial market. The round was led by new investor Paladin Capital Group, a multi-stage private equity firm, and included participation from existing investors Bessemer Venture Partners, Columbia Capital, Kleiner Perkins Caufield & Byers, and TechOperators.

Endgame initially became known for providing cyber intelligence to US agencies such as the National Security Agency but as of 2013 expanded to financial and commercial clients within the private sector, raising an additional $30 million in funding with investment from Edgemore Capital, Top Tier Capital Partners and Savano Capital Partners. Endgame offers defensive analytics of a company's network and servers for data exploits.

Endgame acquired Onyxware in 2014, a Florida-based mobile security technology company which provides applications for detecting third-party network threats. As of November 2014 Endgame claims approximately 100 employees.

On October 8, 2019, Elastic N.V. (NYSE: ESTC), the company behind Elasticsearch and the Elastic Stack, announced that it has completed the acquisition of Endgame.

== Leadership ==
The Endgame Board of Directors is led by Christopher Darby, President and CEO of In-Q-Tel, an independent strategic investment firm supporting the missions of the intelligence community. Endgame announced in March 2013 that Kenneth Minihan, former Director of the National Security Agency and Managing Director at Paladin, had also joined its board of directors. In April 2014 James N. Miller, former Under Secretary of Defense for Policy was appointed to its board of advisers. Niloofar Howe was appointed the chief strategy officer and Jamie Butler serves as its chief scientist. Jon Brody is the senior vice president of marketing and Jim Tosh is the vice president of engineering.
