= Brad Colbert =

United States Marine (born 1974)

- Colbert in 2012
- Born: 1973 or 1974 (age 51–52)
- Military career
- Allegiance: United States of America
- Branch: United States Marine Corps
- Service years: 1995–2016
- Rank: Master sergeant
- Nickname: Iceman
- Units: 3rd Recon Company; 1st Recon Company; 1st Reconnaissance Battalion; Royal Marines Commandos; 1st Force Recon Company; Marine Detachment, Fort Benning GA; Marine Corps Systems Command
- Conflicts: Global War on Terrorism: War in Afghanistan; Iraq War

Brad Colbert (born 1973 or 1974) is a retired United States Marine, whose platoon's role in the 2003 invasion of Iraq was featured in a series of articles in Rolling Stone by Evan Wright. Wright was an embedded reporter who rode in the backseat of Colbert's vehicle during this time until his departure on May 4, 2003. Wright later expanded these articles into the book Generation Kill which was turned into a HBO miniseries of the same name in which Colbert was portrayed by Alexander Skarsgård.

== Career ==
A U.S. Reconnaissance Marine, Colbert was nicknamed the "Iceman" by his colleagues, for his ability to stay calm in battle and his overall military competency. During the War in Afghanistan, he was awarded the Navy and Marine Corps Commendation Medal for valor for his role in taking out an enemy missile battery. In the Iraq War, his platoon, the 2nd Platoon of Bravo Company of the 1st Reconnaissance Battalion led by Lieutenant Nathaniel Fick, was often at the spearhead of the initial invasion, with his team, of which he was team leader, often on point.

For his efforts during the Iraq War, Colbert received a combat meritorious promotion to Staff Sergeant and went on to serve two years with the Royal Marine Commandos as part of an exchange program. He was later promoted again to Gunnery Sergeant and served as the Company Gunnery Sergeant of H&S Company of 1st Recon. He served two additional tours in Iraq and left the Reconnaissance community in 2010.

In October 2012, Colbert was a special skills operations chief at the U.S. Army's airborne school at Fort Benning, Georgia. He was responsible for making sure that Marines who attend the program receive the necessary skills and meet their requirements. He regularly leapt from C-130s to reinforce proper jump techniques.

Military.com reported that in July 2016, Colbert was still on active duty as a project officer for Raids and Amphibious Reconnaissance at Marine Corps Systems Command. Colbert retired from the Marine Corps as a master sergeant on October 24, 2016.

== Personal life ==
Colbert was adopted into a Jewish family. He has been a speaker on combat-related PTSD issues for the Heroes and Healthy Families organization.

== In popular culture ==
- In HBO's television mini-series adaptation of Evan Wright's book, Generation Kill (2004), Colbert is portrayed by the Swedish actor Alexander Skarsgård.
