= Generation Kill =

2004 book by Evan Wright

- Front cover
- Author: Evan Wright
- Language: English
- Genre: Military history
- Publisher: Putnam Adult
- Publication date: June 17, 2004
- Publication place: United States
- Media type: Hardcover
- Pages: 368
- ISBN: 978-0-399-15193-4
- OCLC: 54826116
- Dewey Decimal: 956.7044/3 22
- LC Class: DS79.76 .W75 2004

Generation Kill is a 2004 book written by Rolling Stone journalist Evan Wright chronicling his experience as an embedded reporter with the 1st Reconnaissance Battalion of the United States Marine Corps (the "Devil Dogs" mentioned on the subtitle and repeatedly throughout the book), during the 2003 invasion of Iraq. His account of life with the Marines was originally published as a three-part series in Rolling Stone in the fall of 2003. "The Killer Elite", the first of these articles, went on to win a National Magazine Award for Excellence in Reporting in 2004.

== Assignment ==
Wright spent two months with the battalion, having persuaded a commander that he could cope with such an assignment. The Marines of 1st Reconnaissance Battalion were initially hostile and suspicious but soon warmed to Wright and treated him as one of their own. He gained their respect through his refusal to quit in the face of combat. Often riding in the lead vehicle, a lightly armored Humvee, Wright was in real danger for much of the time, and at one point carried a weapon, although he did so reluctantly.

Wright encounters members of the battalion from all ranks, but the "main players" can be narrowed down to just six from Bravo Company: Sergeant Brad Colbert (the "Iceman" mentioned in the book's subtitle), Lance Corporal Harold James Trombley, Sergeant Rudy "Fruity Rudy" Reyes, First Lieutenant Nathaniel Fick, Sergeant Antonio Espera, and Corporal Josh Ray Person. The "Captain America" in the subtitle is also another Marine identified by nickname, Captain Dave McGraw.

== Consequences for the Marines ==
Sergeant Antonio J. Espera claimed he was forced to leave the battalion, and Staff Sergeant Eric Kocher claimed he was disciplined for statements attributed to him in Wright's reporting. Kocher worked as an adviser on the adaptation of Wright's book into a miniseries and stated that Wright earned credibility because he stayed with the Marines for "every firefight".

Despite initial doubts, Marine commanders later encouraged the officers of 1st Reconnaissance to read the book and the articles to get an insight into the reality of war.

== Statements on combat ==
Wright stated that he felt more fear of combat before he was in it, but as soon as he was being shot at, he focused on survival. He also revealed that prior to becoming a war correspondent he had quit drinking, and as a result, he found there was something "almost nice" about war because it replicated the "emotional chaos of being a heavy drinker".

Wright also has stated he is "haunted" by the deaths of civilians he witnessed during the invasion of Iraq, because the "real rule of war is that the people who suffer the most are civilians". He believes the troops who fight the wars are more attuned to the moral consequences of their actions than the American public whom he accuses of being "alienated from the people who fight their wars for them".

== Post-publication disputes ==
Michael Shoup, an augment Forward Air Controller in the battalion, posted a commentary on the book in which he contrasts the events he witnessed with Wright's descriptions of them. Shoup also states that Wright based his account on one group of enlisted Marines' version of events without including the perspective of others.

Wright replied to this blog post citing his own extensive interview with Shoup that directly contradicts Shoup's later version of events. Wright also cites interviews he conducted with other Marines in the unit that differ from Shoup's account, noting that Shoup's direct superior, Major Eckloff, claimed to have single-handedly killed at least 17 insurgents with a shotgun fired from his truck. Wright states that he reduced that number to 1–2 after other sources contradicted Eckloff. Wright states that his book had to take into consideration interviews from a wide variety of Marines in the battalion, including officers, and could not advance the perspective of just one person.

== Related works ==
Hella Nation is a collection of other writings by Wright that includes his reporting on U.S. soldiers from the 101st Airborne Division fighting in Afghanistan and a controversial story about a documentary film shot in Iraq by a drug-addled Hollywood producer.

American Desperado is a non-fiction book Wright co-wrote with Jon Roberts, about the drug wars. Roberts is featured in the documentary Cocaine Cowboys.

Then-lieutenant Nathaniel Fick's memoir, One Bullet Away: The Making of a Marine Officer, describes some of the same battles in Iraq as described in Generation Kill, but from his own perspective.

== Awards ==
- PEN USA Award
- J. Anthony Lukas Book Prize
- Los Angeles Times Book Prize
- General Wallace Greene Award from the Marine Corps Heritage Foundation

== TV miniseries ==
The cable television channel HBO has produced a miniseries based on the book. Filmed in South Africa, Namibia, and Mozambique, the series aired in July 2008 and spans seven 68-minute episodes, starting with the Marine Recon team crossing the berm into Iraq during the opening stage of Operation Iraqi Freedom. The show was directed by Susanna White for four episodes and Simon Cellan Jones for three episodes. The writers of the miniseries were Ed Burns, David Simon, and Evan Wright. The DVD release includes four bonus features, including a Making of 'Generation Kill' and a video diary. It was produced by David Simon, Ed Burns, Nina K. Noble, George Faber, and Charles Pattinson. It starred Alexander Skarsgård, James Ransone, Stark Sands, Jon Huertas, and Lee Tergesen. Rudy Reyes plays himself in the miniseries adaptation, driving the third Humvee.
