= Generation Kill (miniseries) =

2008 Miniseries on the 2003 invasion of Iraq

- Genre: War drama
- Based on: Generation Kill by Evan Wright
- Written by: David Simon; Ed Burns; Evan Wright
- Directed by: Susanna White; Simon Cellan Jones
- Starring: Alexander Skarsgård; James Ransone; Lee Tergesen; Jon Huertas; Stark Sands; Billy Lush; Jonah Lotan; Wilson Bethel; Pawel Szajda; Marc Menchaca; Rey Valentin; Kellan Lutz; Mike Figueroa; Josh Barrett; Rudy Reyes; Rich McDonald; Eric Ladin; Chance Kelly; Eric Nenninger; Brian Patrick Wade; Neal Jones; Michael Kelly; David Barrera; Benjamin Busch; Owain Yeoman; J. Salome Martinez; Nabil Elouahabi; Robert John Burke
- Country of origin: United States
- Original language: English
- No. of episodes: 7

Production
- Producer: Andrea Calderwood
- Production locations: Mozambique; Namibia; Upington, South Africa; Kragbron, South Africa
- Cinematography: Ivan Strasburg
- Editors: Jason Krasucki; Oral Norrie Ottey
- Running time: 63–69 minutes
- Production companies: Company Pictures; Blown Deadline Productions
- Budget: $56 million

Original release
- Network: HBO
- Release: July 13 – August 24, 2008

Generation Kill is an American seven-part television miniseries produced for HBO that aired from July 13 to August 24, 2008. It is based on Evan Wright's 2004 book Generation Kill, about his experience as an embedded reporter with the US Marine Corps' 1st Reconnaissance Battalion during the 2003 invasion of Iraq, and was adapted for television by David Simon, Ed Burns, and Wright. The miniseries was directed by Susanna White and Simon Cellan Jones and produced by Andrea Calderwood. The ensemble cast includes Alexander Skarsgård as Sergeant Brad "Iceman" Colbert, Jon Huertas as Sergeant Tony "Poke" Espera, James Ransone as Corporal Josh Ray Person, and Lee Tergesen as Wright.

== Production ==
The cable channel HBO gave the go-ahead to a seven-part miniseries based on Evan Wright's book about his experiences as an embedded reporter with the U.S. Marine Corps' 1st Reconnaissance Battalion during the Iraq War's first phase. The series is set during the invasion of Iraq, from late March to early April 2003. The miniseries was shot over a six-month shoot from mid-to-late 2007 in South Africa, Mozambique, and Namibia. The miniseries was produced on a budget of $56 million, with an emphasis on the realism of the production design.

=== Crew ===
David Simon and Ed Burns co-wrote and executive produced the miniseries alongside Company Pictures' George Faber and Charles Pattinson, and HBO's Anne Thomopoulos. Andrea Calderwood was the producer; Nina Noble served as co-executive producer; author Evan Wright was credited as a consulting producer; Susanna White and Simon Cellan Jones directed the episodes; and two former U.S. Marines, Eric Kocher and Rudy Reyes, served as the production's military advisors as well as starred in the series.

== Cast and characters ==
There are 28 starring cast members with a large supporting cast. The majority of the characters were drawn from the Second Platoon of the First Reconnaissance Battalion's Bravo Company. Lee Tergesen played embedded reporter Evan Wright, though throughout the series he is only referred to as "Reporter," "Scribe," or "Rolling Stone". Wright was assigned to the lead vehicle of Bravo Company, which he shared with Sergeant Brad "Iceman" Colbert, played by Alexander Skarsgård, Corporal Josh Ray Person, played by James Ransone and Lance Corporal Harold James Trombley, played by Billy Lush. To prepare for their roles as Recon Marines, the cast attended a six-day boot camp led by Eric Kocher and Rudy Reyes.

Other starring characters, from 2nd platoon include:

- Stark Sands as First lieutenant Nathaniel Fick
- Marc Menchaca as Gunnery Sergeant Mike "Gunny" Wynn
- Jon Huertas as Sergeant Antonio "Poke" Espera
- Mike Figueroa as Sergeant Leandro "Shady B" Baptista
- Josh Barrett as Sergeant Larry Shawn "Pappy" Patrick
- Sergeant Rodolfo "Fruity Rudy" Reyes as himself
- Jonah Lotan as Hospital Corpsman Second Class Robert Timothy "Doc" Bryan
- Wilson Bethel as Corporal Evan "Q-Tip" Stafford
- Pawel Szajda as Corporal Walt Hasser
- Rey Valentin as Corporal Gabriel "Gabe" Garza
- Sean Brosnan as Corporal Daniel Redman
- Kellan Lutz as Corporal Jason Lilley
- Rich McDonald as Corporal Anthony "Manimal" Jacks
- Eric Ladin as Corporal James Chaffin
- Daniel Fox as Private First Class John Christeson

Additional characters:

- Robert John Burke as Major general James "Chaos" Mattis, commanding general of 1st Marine Division
- Chance Kelly as Lieutenant colonel Stephen "Godfather" Ferrando, commanding officer (CO) of the First Reconnaissance Battalion
- Benjamin Busch as Major Todd Eckloff, executive officer of the battalion
- Michael Kelly as Captain Bryan Patterson, CO of Alpha Company
- Brian Patrick Wade as Captain Craig "Encino Man" Schwetje, CO of Bravo Company
- Eric Nenninger as Captain Dave "Captain America" McGraw, the erratic CO of 3rd platoon, Bravo company
- Neal Jones as Sergeant major John Sixta, a loudmouth Battalion Senior NCO
- David Barrera as Gunnery Sergeant Ray "Casey Kasem" Griego, Bravo Company's operations chief
- Owain Yeoman as Sergeant Eric Kocher, a long-suffering team leader under the command of "Captain America". The real-life Eric Kocher portrays another Marine (Gunnery Sergeant Rich Barrett) who drives Captain Patterson's command Humvee in Alpha.
- J. Salome Martinez Jr. as Corporal Jeffrey "Dirty Earl" Carazales
- Nabil Elouahabi as "Meesh", the battalion translator

== Episodes ==
No.	Title	Directed by	Written by	Original release date
1	"Get Some"	Susanna White	David Simon & Ed Burns	July 13, 2008
Marines prepare to invade Iraq at the beginning of Operation Iraqi Freedom; while the Marines wait to receive their orders at Camp Mathilda in Kuwait, they learn that a Rolling Stone columnist, Evan Wright, will be embedded with them.
2	"The Cradle of Civilization"	Susanna White	Story by : David Simon & Ed Burns; Teleplay by : Ed Burns and Evan Wright	July 20, 2008
With the invasion of Iraq now in full swing, Sgt. Colbert tries to keep his unit focused. First Recon Marines adjust to shifting attack plans while anticipating their first contact with the enemy in Nasiriyah and Al Gharraf.
3	"Screwby"	Susanna White	Story by : David Simon & Ed Burns; Teleplay by : Ed Burns	July 27, 2008
Bravo Company await their next orders for a recon mission, having survived its first trial by fire; Fick tries to take control of a dangerous situation; Lt. Col. Ferrando issues a new, more urgent order shortly after Alpha Company shells Ar Rifa.
4	"Combat Jack"	Simon Cellan Jones	Story by : David Simon & Ed Burns; Teleplay by : David Simon	August 3, 2008
Grumbling in the ranks about the abandoned supply truck occupies time to kill at the captured airfield, but Bravo is soon on the move again, heading north, clearing villages and setting up a roadblock outside Al Hayy. Meanwhile, Alpha is ordered to find the body of a Marine in Al-Shatrah, but their mission is delayed by a CIA operation.
5	"A Burning Dog"	Simon Cellan Jones	Story by : David Simon & Ed Burns; Teleplay by : Evan Wright	August 10, 2008
Despite an armored division's punishing response to First Recon's intelligence-gathering about an ambush-in-waiting at a strategic bridge, Bravo still meets stiff resistance while making several attempts to cross it; a survey of the battlefield prompts more questions than answers about the enemy; a roadblock in Al Muwaffiqiyah tests the Marines' ever-changing rules of engagement.
6	"Stay Frosty"	Simon Cellan Jones	Story by : David Simon & Ed Burns; Teleplay by : Ed Burns	August 17, 2008
After First Recon is assigned the unfamiliar mission of escorting hundreds of civilians fleeing Baghdad, they begin to wonder if their part in the war may be ending. Lt. Col. Ferrando has other plans to get his men back into the battle.
7	"Bomb in the Garden"	Susanna White	Story by : David Simon & Ed Burns; Teleplay by : David Simon	August 24, 2008
Having reached Baghdad, Bravo Company is shocked at the size of the city; while First Recon begin doing their daily patrols in Baghdad, they find out the obstacles that they and the Iraqis face are much greater than they could have imagined.

== Soundtrack ==
Although the series has no score, it features a large collection of music, much of it songs that were popular among the American populace in late 2002 and early 2003. The newer music (in the show's context) serves to illustrate pop culture during the time of the invasion. All of the songs are sung a cappella by cast members, with the exception of Johnny Cash's "The Man Comes Around" and Josh Ray Person's "Re-Up Time".

=== Episode 1: "Get Some" ===
"Merry Christmas from the Family", by Robert Earl Keen
"Sk8er Boi", by Avril Lavigne
"Lovin' You", by Minnie Riperton
"Use Me", by Bill Withers

=== Episode 2: "The Cradle of Civilization" ===
"Beyoğlu", by D.J. Kambo
"The Marines' Hymn", Traditional
"Smoke Signals", by Dada Flair
"Complicated", by Avril Lavigne
"Bodies", by Drowning Pool
"Boyz-n-the-Hood", by Dynamite Hack
"Hot in Herre", by Nelly

=== Episode 3: "Screwby" ===
"Hot in Herre", by Nelly
"It Was a Good Day", by Ice Cube
"Tainted Love", by Ed Cobb

=== Episode 4: "Combat Jack" ===
"The "Fish" Cheer/I-Feel-Like-I'm-Fixin'-to-Die Rag", by Country Joe and the Fish
"Attahaddiat", by Kadhum Al Sahir
"Entaha Almeshwar", by Kadhum Al Sahir
"Copenhagen Song", by Josh Ray Person
"Teenage Dirtbag", by Wheatus

=== Episode 5: "A Burning Dog" ===
"On the Road Again", by Willie Nelson
"Sundown", by Gordon Lightfoot
"My Cherie Amour", by Stevie Wonder
"Gangsta Gangsta", by N.W.A

=== Episode 6: "Stay Frosty" ===
"It Ain't Easy", by Tupac Shakur
"Let Me Ride", by Dr. Dre
"Fuck tha Police", by N.W.A
"Mammas Don't Let Your Babies Grow Up to Be Cowboys", by Ed Bruce
"Can I Kick It?", by A Tribe Called Quest
"So Fresh, So Clean", by Outkast

=== Episode 7: "Bomb in the Garden" ===
"9 to 5 (Morning Train)", by Sheena Easton
"Come Sail Away", by Styx
"King of the Road", by Roger Miller
"Re-Up Time", by Josh Ray Person
"The Man Comes Around", by Johnny Cash

== Reception ==
=== Critical response ===
The miniseries received very positive reviews from critics. On Rotten Tomatoes, the miniseries has an approval rating of 86% based on 42 reviews, with an average rating of 9.1/10. The critical consensus reads, "Generation Kill plunges the viewer into war with a visceral force that's still somehow reined in by masterful storytelling and a strong command of period details." On Metacritic, it received a score of 80 out of 100 based on 27 reviews, indicating "generally favorable reviews". A red carpet screening of Generation Kill was held for U.S. Marines at Camp Pendleton in California, where the series was favorably received.

Sarah Hughes of The Guardian said "Generation Kill is, to my mind anyway, the best Iraq war drama by some distance". Entertainment Weekly gave the series an "A−" rating, and critic Ken Tucker remarked favorably on its avoidance of cliché, self-consciousness, and agenda-driven storytelling, and praised its execution, nuance, and verisimilitude. Robert Bianco of USA Today wrote: "the seven-part Generation Kill is what you'd hope for from the people behind The Wire: an honest, barely adorned, sometimes painfully vivid representation of life as we live it now. It's journalism converted to art, with both benefiting". Nev Pierce of Empire gave the miniseries a perfect five out of five stars. Brian Lowry of Variety says "HBO nails the target with Generation Kill".

Tim Goodman of SFGate praised the series' authenticity and attention to detail. Writing for The New York Times, Alessandra Stanley remarked "Generation Kill has a superb cast and script, provides a searingly intense, clear-eyed look at the first stage of the war, and it is often gripping". Noel Murray of The A.V. Club wrote: "By the time Generation Kill's final chapter ends, Wright and company have created not just a nuanced, necessary explication of recent events, but an epic that can stand alongside the greatest long-form movies ever made". Pattie Pegler of Stuff said, "This is a complex, unwieldy tale that draws you in and isn't afraid to take its time. And, in that way it reminds me of The Wire – a brilliant piece of television that left you thinking long after you switched off. Generation Kill promises to be equally unforgettable." Stephen Armstrong of The Daily Telegraph also praised the series, saying "It's one of the best TV dramas of the 21st century in its ambitious blend of scale and intimacy."

Conversely, Austin Smith of the New York Post was not as impressed. He described the series "as dull and throbbing as a severe headache". Similarly, Troy Patterson of Slate wrote: "Generation Kill is too skeptical about authority to entertain neocons or red-meat nationalists and too depressing to delight a good liberal. It plays like it's been built for antisocial boys—armchair heroes in love with guns and in search of demented adventure."

=== Accolades ===
Year	Award	Category	Nominee(s)	Result	Ref.
2008	Gracie Awards	Outstanding Director – Entertainment Series or Special	Susanna White	Won	
2009	Artios Awards	Outstanding Achievement in Casting – Television Mini Series	Alexa L. Fogel	Won	
2009	Cinema Audio Society Awards	Outstanding Achievement in Sound Mixing for Television Movies and Miniseries	Danny Hambrook, Stuart Hilliker, and Alexandros Sidiropoulos (for "A Burning Dog")	Nominated	
2009	Golden Reel Awards	Best Sound Editing – Long Form Dialogue and ADR in Television	Barry Donnelly, Stefan Henrix, Becki Ponting, Will Ralston, and Iain Eyre (for "Get Some")	Won	
2009	Golden Reel Awards	Best Sound Editing - Long Form Sound Effects and Foley in Television	Stefan Henrix, Andy Kennedy, David Evans, Graham Headicar, Lee Walpole, Jack Whittaker, Virginia Thorn, Andrea King, and Jack Stew (for "A Burning Dog")	Nominated	
2009	Imagen Awards	Best Supporting Actor/Television	Rudy Reyes	Nominated	
2009	Primetime Emmy Awards	Outstanding Miniseries	David Simon, Ed Burns, George Faber, Nina Kostroff Noble, and Andrea Calderwood	Nominated	
2009	Primetime Emmy Awards	Outstanding Directing for a Miniseries, Movie or Dramatic Special	Susanna White (for "Bomb in the Garden")	Nominated	
2009	Primetime Emmy Awards	Outstanding Writing for a Miniseries, Movie or Dramatic Special	David Simon and Ed Burns (for "Bomb in the Garden")	Nominated	
2009	Primetime Creative Arts Emmy Awards	Outstanding Art Direction for a Miniseries or Movie	Rob Harris, Mickey Lennon, and Emelia Weavind	Nominated	
2009	Primetime Creative Arts Emmy Awards	Outstanding Casting for a Miniseries, Movie or Special	Alexa L. Fogel, Christa Schamberger, Suzanne Crowley, and Gilly Poole	Nominated	
2009	Primetime Creative Arts Emmy Awards	Outstanding Cinematography for a Miniseries or Movie	Ivan Strasburg (for "Combat Jack")	Nominated	
2009	Primetime Creative Arts Emmy Awards	Outstanding Single-Camera Picture Editing for a Miniseries or Movie	Jason Krasucki (for "The Cradle of Civilization")	Nominated	
2009	Primetime Creative Arts Emmy Awards	Outstanding Single-Camera Picture Editing for a Miniseries or Movie	Oral Norrie Ottey (for "A Burning Dog")	Nominated	
2009	Primetime Creative Arts Emmy Awards	Outstanding Sound Editing for a Miniseries, Movie or a Special	Lee Walpole, Stefan Henrix, Graham Headicar, Jack Whittaker, Becki Ponting, Jennifer Ralston, Iain Eyre, Andre Schmidt, Virginia Thorn, Andy Kennedy, Pete Burgis, and Andi Derrick (for "The Cradle of Civilization")	Won	
2009	Primetime Creative Arts Emmy Awards	Outstanding Sound Mixing for a Miniseries or Movie	Colin Nicolson, Paul Hamblin, and Martin Jensen (for "The Cradle of Civilization")	Won	
2009	Primetime Creative Arts Emmy Awards	Outstanding Special Visual Effects for a Miniseries, Movie or a Special	Adam McInnes, Courtney Vanderslice-Law, Antony Bluff, Paul Edwards, Ken Dailey, Stephane Paris, David Sewell, Stuart Partridge, and Jean-Paul Rovela (for "The Cradle of Civilization")	Won	
2009	Television Critics Association Awards	Outstanding Achievement in Movies, Miniseries and Specials		Nominated	
2009	Visual Effects Society Awards	Outstanding Visual Effects in a Broadcast Miniseries, Movie, or Special	Adam McInnes, Anthony Bluff, Stephane Paris, and David Sewell (for "The Cradle of Civilization")	Nominated	
2009	Visual Effects Society Awards	Outstanding Matte Paintings in a Broadcast Program or Commercial	Christian Irles and Yannick Bourgie (for "The Cradle of Civilization")	Nominated	
2009	Writers Guild of America Awards	Long Form – Adaptation	David Simon and Ed Burns (for "Stay Frosty" and "Bomb in the Garden"); Based on the book by Evan Wright	Nominated	
2010	Royal Television Society Awards	International Award		Nominated	
