= Andrea Calderwood =

British film and television producer

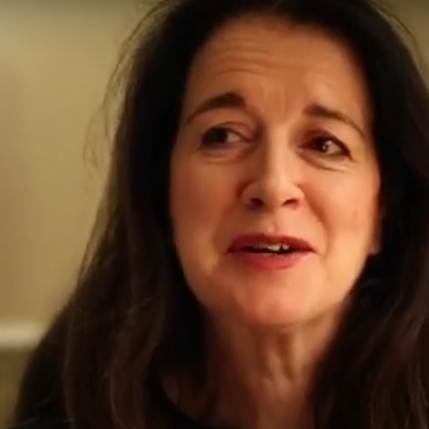
- in 2019 by Scotland Malawi Partnership
- Born: Paisley, Scotland, United Kingdom
- Education: University of Stirling
- Occupations: Film producer, television producer

Andrea Calderwood is a British film and television producer. She produced Mrs Brown (1997) and The Boy Who Harnessed the Wind (2019), which was distributed by Netflix.

== Life ==
Calderwood was born in Paisley, Scotland. She took film and media studies at University of Stirling. Aged 28, she was appointed BBC Scotland head of drama. In 2000, she founded the production company Slate Films.

She won a British Academy of Film and Television Award for Best British Film for her work on The Last King of Scotland (2006). She produced the HBO television mini-series Generation Kill (2008).

In 2012, Scottish newspaper The Herald put Calderwood as number 42 in its list of Scotland's top 50 influential women. She produced the film Half of a Yellow Sun, which premiered in 2013 at the Toronto International Film Festival. In 2019, she produced The Boy Who Harnessed the Wind, distributed by Netflix.

== Filmography ==
=== Films ===
Year	Title	Credit	Notes
1988	The Dressmaker	Production Trainee	
1992	Blue Black Permanent	Location Manager	
1992	Sealladh	Producer	short film
1994	Marooned	Producer	short film
1995	Nervous Energy	Executive producer	
1996	Small Faces	Executive producer	
1996	Initiation	Executive producer	
1997	Mrs Brown	Executive producer	
1998	Jilting Joe	Executive producer	
1999	An Ideal Husband	Executive producer	
1999	Ratcatcher	Executive producer	
1999	The Darkest Light	Executive producer	
2000	Love's Labour's Lost	Associate producer	
2000	There's Only One Jimmy Grimble	Executive producer	
2000	It Was an Accident	Executive producer	
2000	The Claim	Executive producer	
2001	The Hole	Executive producer	
2001	Hotel	Executive producer	
2002	Once Upon a Time in the Midlands	Producer	
2006	Cargo	Producer	
2006	The Last King of Scotland	Producer	
2010	I Am Slave	Producer	
2013	Kiss the Water	Executive producer	
2013	Half of a Yellow Sun	Producer	
2014	A Most Wanted Man	Producer	
2014	A Little Chaos	Producer	
2015	Trespass Against Us	Producer	
2016	Our Kind of Traitor	Executive producer	
2017	Woman Walks Ahead	Producer	
2018	The Little Stranger	Producer	
2018	Yuli	Producer	
2019	The Boy Who Harnessed the Wind	Producer	
2024	Rob Peace	Producer	
2024	Mother Mother	Producer	
2025	Die My Love	Producer	

=== Television ===
Year	Title	Credit	Notes
1995–1997	Hamish Macbeth	Executive producer	15 episodes
1996	Truth or Dear	Executive producer	TV movie
1996	Nightlife	Executive producer	TV movie
1996	Flowers of the Forest	Executive producer	TV movie
1996	The Crow Road	Executive producer	5 episodes
1997	The Missing Postman	Executive producer	TV movie
1997	Bumping the Odds	Executive producer	TV movie
1998	Looking After Jo Jo	Executive producer	Various episodes
1998	Invasion: Earth	Executive producer	Mini-series
2008	Generation Kill	Producer	Mini-series
2011	The Field of Blood	Executive producer	Mini-series
2022-2024	Funny Woman	Executive producer	10 episodes
2023	The Buccaneers	Producer	8 episodes
2026	Secret Service	Executive producer	5 episodes
