= Benjamin Busch =

American actor and writer (born 1968)

Benjamin B. Busch
- Born: 1968 (age 57–58); New York, New York
- Occupations: Actor, writer, film maker
- Years active: 1997–present
- Parent: Frederick Busch (father)
- Military career
- Allegiance: United States of America
- Branch: United States Marine Corps
- Service years: 1992–present
- Rank: Lieutenant Colonel
- Units: 2nd Battalion 8th Marines; 4th Marine Division
- Commands: Delta Company, 4th Light Armored Reconnaissance Battalion
- Conflicts: Operation Iraqi Freedom *2003 invasion of Iraq
- Awards: Purple Heart; Bronze Star; Presidential Unit Citation; Iraq Campaign Medal

Benjamin B. Busch is an American actor, writer, film maker, photographer, and United States Marine Corps Reserve officer. He is best known for his portrayal of Anthony Colicchio on the HBO original series The Wire.

== Biography ==
Benjamin Busch was born in December 1968 in Manhattan and grew up in Poolville, New York. He attended Vassar College from 1987 through 1991. Busch graduated with a major in Studio Art and joined the United States Marine Corps, where he served as an active duty officer from 1992 to 1996. Resigning from active duty service in 1996, he continued to serve in the Marine Forces Reserve. In 1997 he began a career in acting, appearing in Party of Five, Homicide: Life on the Street, and The West Wing. He deployed to Iraq in 2003, where he served two tours of duty with the 4th Light Armored Reconnaissance Battalion. After his first deployment in 2004, he began playing the role of Officer Anthony Colicchio on the HBO series The Wire, appearing in the final three seasons of the show. In 2005, he deployed to Ramadi, Iraq as Team Leader for Detachment 3 of the 5th Civil Affairs Group. He later played the role of Major Todd Eckloff on the HBO mini-series Generation Kill. His first film as a writer/director, "Sympathetic Details", was released in February 2008. His latest release, "Bright", was featured at the 2011 Traverse City Film Festival. In 2015 Busch starred in the short film Turned produced by Vanishing Angle alongside actors Ryan Driscoll and Zackary Arthur. In March 2022, Busch appeared in a CNN report from Ukraine entitled "American veterans train Ukrainian volunteers in combat."

== Photography ==
Busch took photographs of his experiences in Iraq during his two tours of duty, which formed the basis for his exhibits of photographs, "The Art in War" (2003) and "Occupation" (2005). "Abstract Matter", his final exhibit of images from Iraq, was released in 2008.

== Personal ==
He is the son of author and novelist Frederick Busch and grew up in upstate New York.

== Memoir ==
In March 2012, Busch followed in his father's literary footsteps, publishing a memoir primarily about his wartime experiences, winning early critical acclaim. A review in the New York Journal of Books stated: "No other writer has moved me as much as Benjamin Busch has in writing about war. No other writer has created such a moment of grace . . . Dust to Dust is a work of extraordinary merit. I’ve found no better book of any genre, by any author, so far this year, and likely will not in the months ahead."

== Bibliography ==
=== Articles ===
- Busch, Benjamin (February 2009). "Bearing arms : the serious boy at war". Harper's. Vol. 318, no. 1905. pp. 54–60.

=== Books ===
- Busch, Benjamin (2012). Dust to Dust: A Memoir. Ecco. ISBN 9780062014849. OCLC 774905644.
