= Jennifer Bachus =

American diplomat

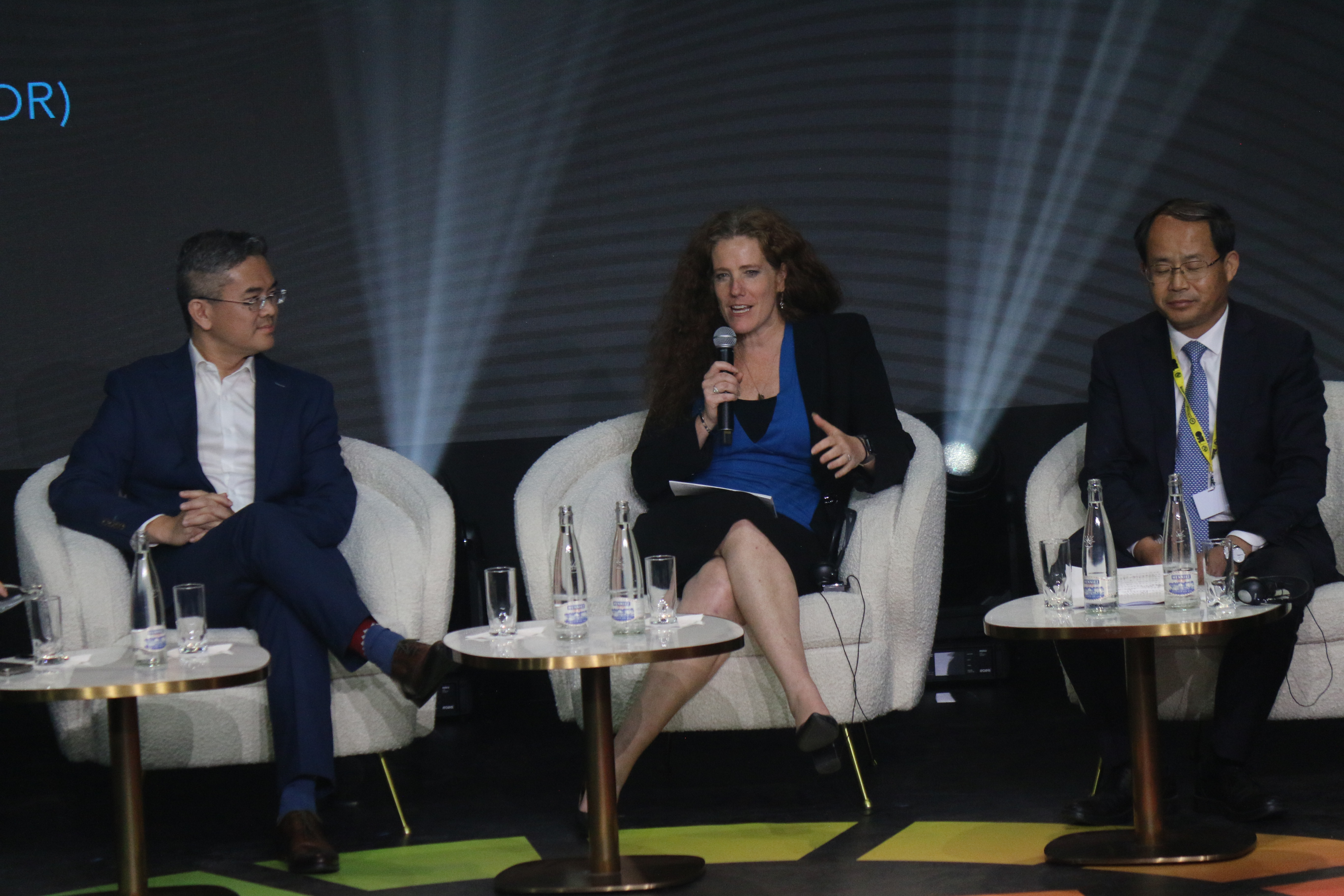
Bachus at the 2025 AI for Good Summit in Geneva

Jennifer Bachus is an American diplomat and career member of the Senior Foreign Service who serves as principal deputy assistant secretary and senior bureau official for the Bureau of Cyberspace and Digital Policy at the United States Department of State. She was the inaugural lead official of the bureau when it was established in 2022 and has acted as head of the bureau pending the appointment of an ambassador-at-large.

== Career ==
Bachus joined the United States Foreign Service in 1998 and is a long-time member of the American Foreign Service Association. She is a career member of the Senior Foreign Service.

In 2022 the State Department created the Bureau of Cyberspace and Digital Policy (CDP) to lead and coordinate U.S. diplomacy on cyberspace, digital technologies, and related cyber-security issues. Bachus was named the bureau’s senior bureau official and principal deputy assistant secretary, serving as its inaugural lead while the administration sought Senate confirmation of an ambassador-at-large to head the office. As principal deputy assistant secretary, she has overseen work on international cyber security, cross-border data policy, and digital rights, including U.S. participation in multilateral discussions on cyber norms and internet governance.

Bachus has described the bureau’s approach as one of “digital solidarity”, in which the United States works with partners and allies to promote an open, secure, and rights-respecting digital environment rather than pursuing unilateral technological dominance. She has spoken publicly about the bureau’s role in shaping international responses to ransomware, supply-chain security, and the protection of undersea cables, data centres, and other critical digital infrastructure.

Bachus has appeared frequently in public discussions of cyber diplomacy and digital policy, including events hosted by the American Foreign Service Association, the Technology Policy Institute’s Aspen Forum, the German Marshall Fund, and the International Telecommunication Union’s AI for Good Global Summit, where she has represented the State Department’s perspective on international cyber security and cross-border data flows.

=== Early foreign service career ===
Before moving into cyber and digital policy, Bachus held a series of overseas and Washington assignments. She served as chargé d’affaires ad interim and deputy chief of mission at the U.S. Embassy in Prague, Czech Republic, and earlier as deputy chief of mission at the U.S. Embassy in Pristina, Kosovo. Her other overseas postings have included work as political-economic counselor at the U.S. Embassy in Astana, Kazakhstan, and as head of the American Presence Post in Toulouse, France. In Washington she has served as office director for Central Europe in the Bureau of European and Eurasian Affairs and as special assistant in the Office of the Under Secretary for Economic Growth, Energy, and the Environment.

=== Education ===
Bachus has a M.A. from the College of Europe in Bruges and her undergraduate degree is from Brown University.
