= Adam Cassady =

American government official

- Official State Department Photo

United States Ambassador-at-Large for Cyberspace and Digital Policy
- Incumbent
- Assumed office August 7, 2026
- President: Donald Trump
- Preceded by: Nathaniel Fick

Personal details
- Education: Ohio State University; University of Chicago Law School

Adam Cassady is a veteran bureaucrat of the American government who currently serves as the United States Ambassador-at-Large for Cyberspace and Digital Policy.

== Biography ==
Cassady holds a bachelor’s degree from Ohio State University and a law degree from the University of Chicago Law School.Prior to working for the United States government, he co-founded a technology firm focused on delivering enterprise machine learning solutions.

Cassady worked for over four years at the Federal Communications Commission under Commissioner Nathan Simington, first as Senior Legal Advisor and subsequently as Chief of Staff, managing a variety of telecommunications and technology portfolios. Cassady transitioned from the FCC to the National Telecommunications and Information Administration via an appointment on March 16, 2025 taking on the roles of Principal Deputy Assistant Secretary and Deputy Administrator.

In March 2026, President Donald Trump nominated Cassady, who was then a resident of Virginia, to serve in his administration as ambassador-at-large for cyberspace and digital policy. The Senate Foreign Relations Committee advanced the nomination by a vote of 17–5 on April 30, 2026. The U.S. Senate confirmed Cassady to the position on August 7, 2026 by a vote of 51 to 47.
