= Brian Patrick Wade =

American actor and physical trainer (born 1978)

- Born: June 9, 1978 (age 48); Los Angeles, California, U.S.
- Occupations: Actor, personal trainer
- Years active: 2002–present
- Spouse: Brooke Wade
- Children: 3

Brian Patrick Wade (born June 9, 1978) is an American actor and physical trainer, best known for his television roles as Capt. Craig Schwetje in the mini-series Generation Kill, as Kurt (Penny's former love interest) in The Big Bang Theory, and as the Alpha Werewolf Ennis on Teen Wolf.

== Career ==
Wade made his debut in 2002 as an exotic dancer on CSI: Miami. He later appeared in the films Latter Days and The Guardian.

He later appeared on television in episodes of Two and a Half Men, Sabrina, the Teenage Witch, NCIS, Las Vegas, Surface, 'Til Death, The Closer, The Game, and Teen Wolf. He appeared in episodes of Agents of S.H.I.E.L.D. portraying Carl "Crusher" Creel, also known as the Absorbing Man.

== Filmography ==
=== Film ===
Year	Title	Role	Notes
2003	Latter Days	Stacy	
2004	Bring It On Again	Fatneck	Direct-to-video *as Brian Wade
2005	Death by Engagement	Officer Mallar	
2006	The Guardian	Mitch Lyons	
2016	Ctrl Alt Delete	Burton	
2016	Trust No One	Milan	Short

=== Television ===
Year	Title	Role	Notes
2002	CSI: Miami	Other lap dancer	Episode: "Breathless" (1.07) *as Brian Wade
2002	Sabrina the Teenage Witch	Kim	Episode: "Bada-Ping!" (7.08) *as Brian Wade
2003	NCIS	Marine Lance Corporal	Episode: "Hung Out to Dry" (1.02) *as Brian Wade
2005	Las Vegas	Muscular guy	Episode: "Can You See What I see?" (2.16)
2005	Surface	E.O.D. Commander	Episode (1.01)
2006	Twenty Good Years	Drew	Episode: "The Elbow Incident" (1.03)
2006	Mafiosa	Marco	*as Brian Wade
2006	Two and a Half Men	Sam	Episode: "The Sea Is a Harsh Mistress" (4.03)
2006	Help Me Help You	Former Navy Seal	Episode: "Pink Freud" (1.04)
2007	'Til Death	Jack	Episode: "That's Ridiculous" (1.20)
2007	The Closer	Eric Ellis	Episode: "Dumb Luck" (3.06)
2007, 2009	The Big Bang Theory	Kurt	3 episodes
2008	Generation Kill	Captain Craig "Encino Man" Schwetje	Miniseries; 7 episodes
2009	The Game	Derek	Episode: "Do the Wright Thing" (3.13)
2009	NCIS	Private David Singer	Episode: "Code of Conduct" (7.05)
2009	Alligator Point	Bill	Television film *as Brian Wade
2012	NCIS: Los Angeles	Navy Petty Officer First Class David Hodgkins	Episode: "Vengeance" (3.19)
2012	Best Friends Forever	Fireman #1	Episode: "Put a Pin in It" (1.03)
2012	The Glades	Sean Simmons	Episode: "Close Encounters" (3.01)
2013	Arrested Development	Sergeant Melnick	Episode: "Off the Hook" (4.14)
2013	Teen Wolf	Ennis	5 episodes; Recurring role (season 3)
2013	Hello Ladies	Bouncer	Episode: "Long Beach" (1.06)
2014	The Mentalist	Martin Hagen	Episode: "The Golden Hammer" (6.12)
2014–2018	Agents of S.H.I.E.L.D.	Carl "Crusher" Creel	Guest (season 2–3); Recurring (season 5); 9 episodes
2021	A Loud House Christmas	Rip Hardcore	TV film
