= Alexander Skarsgård =

Swedish actor (born 1976)

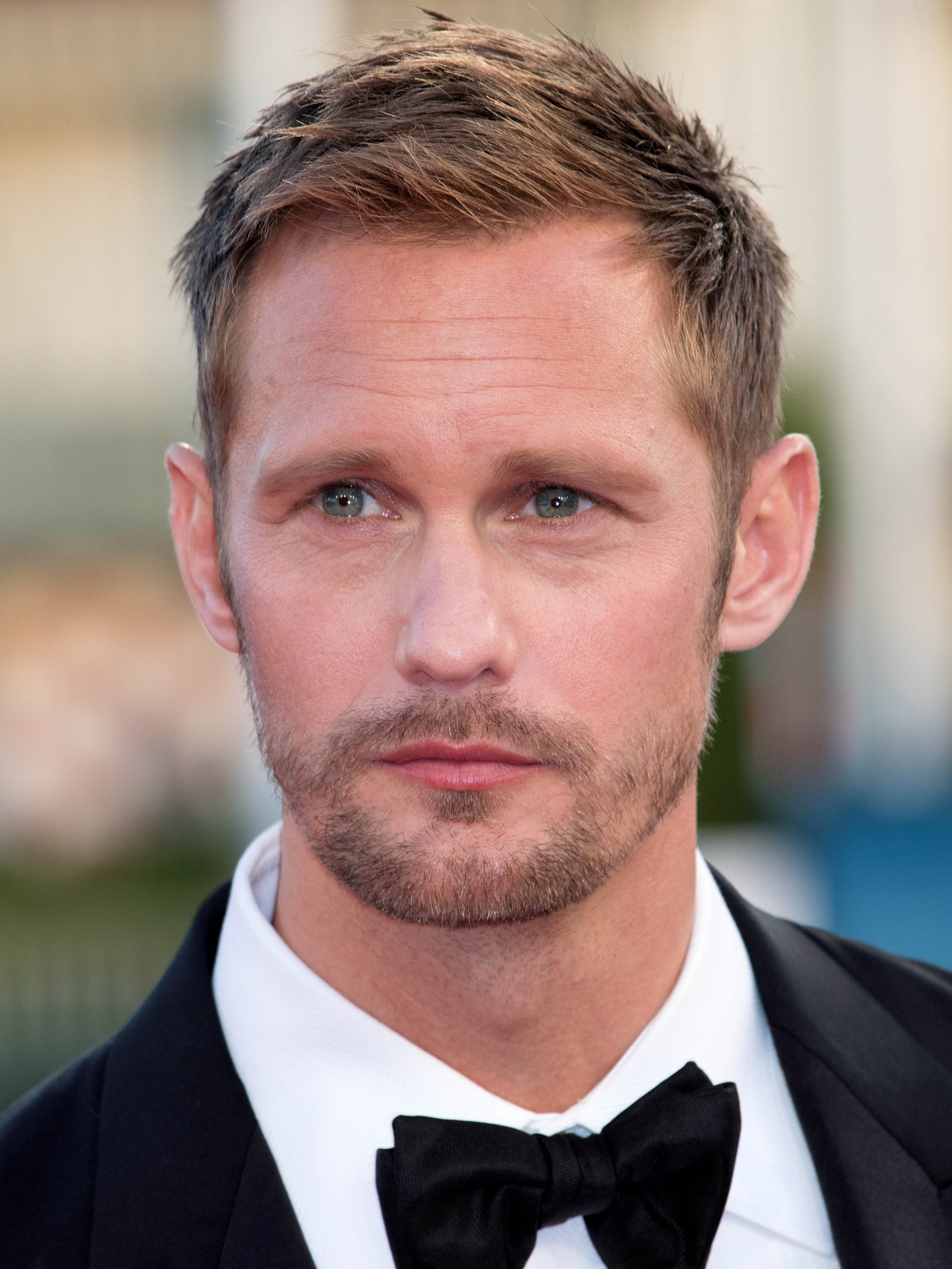
- Skarsgård in 2016
- Born: Alexander Johan Hjalmar Skarsgård; 25 August 1976 (age 50); Stockholm, Sweden
- Occupation: Actor
- Years active: 1984–present
- Children: 1
- Father: Stellan Skarsgård
- Relatives: Gustaf Skarsgård (brother); Bill Skarsgård (brother); Valter Skarsgård (brother); Kolbjörn Skarsgård (half-brother)

Alexander Johan Hjalmar Skarsgård (Note: Swedish pronunciation: [alɛkˈsǎnːdɛr ˈskɑ̌ːʂɡoːɖ]) (born 25 August 1976) is a Swedish actor. A son of actor Stellan Skarsgård, he began acting at the age of seven but quit at thirteen. After serving in the Swedish Navy, Skarsgård returned to acting and gained his first role in the American comedy film Zoolander (2001). He played Brad Colbert in the miniseries Generation Kill (2008) and had his international breakthrough portraying vampire Eric Northman in the television series True Blood (2008–2014).

After appearing in films such as Melancholia (2011), Battleship (2012) and The Legend of Tarzan (2016), Skarsgård starred in the drama series Big Little Lies (2017–2019) as an abusive husband, which earned him a Primetime Emmy Award and a Golden Globe Award. He went on to appear in the films Long Shot (2019), Godzilla vs. Kong (2021), Passing (2021), The Northman (2022), which he also produced, Infinity Pool (2023), and Pillion (2025). He also played Randall Flagg in the miniseries The Stand (2020–2021) and tech mogul Lukas Matsson in the drama series Succession (2021–2023), for which he was nominated for two Primetime Emmy Awards and a Golden Globe Award. He currently stars in the science-fiction comedy series Murderbot (2025–present).

== Early life and education ==
Skarsgård was born on 25 August 1976 in Stockholm, Sweden. He is the eldest son of actor Stellan Skarsgård and physician My Skarsgård. His parents are divorced. He has five younger siblings: Gustaf, Sam, Bill, Eija and Valter, and two half-brothers, Ossian and Kolbjörn, from his father's second wife, Megan Everett. Gustaf, Bill, Valter, and Kolbjörn are also actors.

A friend of his father's, a director, gave Skarsgård his first film role when he was seven years old, playing Kalle Nubb in Åke and His World (Åke och hans värld). In 1989, his lead role in the Swedish television production Hunden som log (The Dog That Smiled) earned him praise and brought him to prominence in Sweden at age 13. Uncomfortable with the fame, he quit acting at that same age.

At 19, Skarsgård applied for his national service. He served for 18 months in the Swedish Navy's SäkJakt ("protect and hunt") unit that dealt with anti-sabotage and anti-terrorism in the Stockholm archipelago. After completing his service in 1996, he left Sweden and attended Leeds Metropolitan University in England for six months. He enrolled to study English but admits he did not study much and "had a blast" instead. While there, he considered pursuing an architecture career, but chose acting instead. In 1997, he enrolled in a theatre course at Marymount Manhattan College and moved to New York City. He returned to Stockholm after six months, but his time studying theatre confirmed to him that he wanted to act.

== Career ==
=== 2000s: Career beginnings and television breakthrough ===
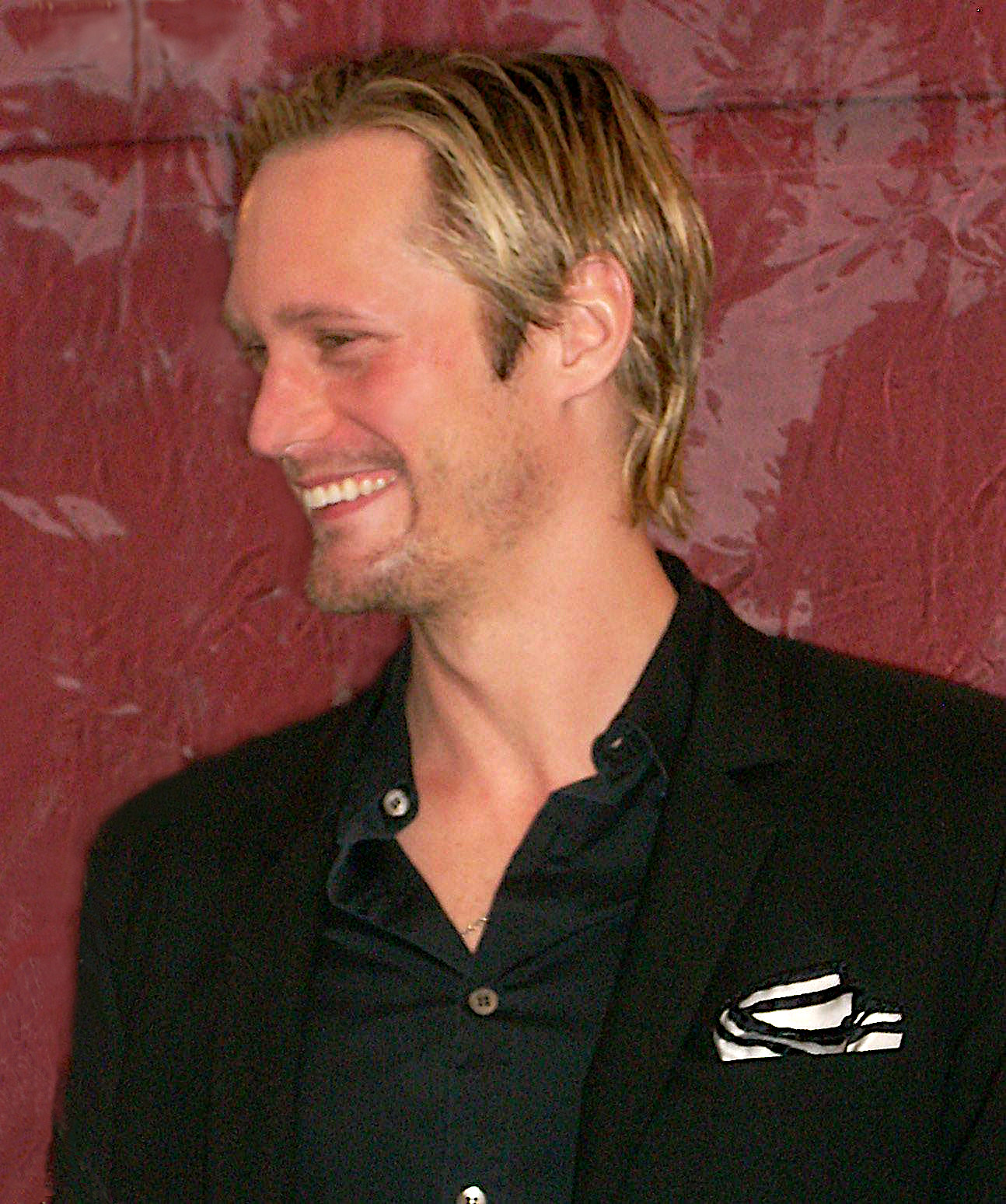
Skarsgård at the 2009 PaleyFest

On his return to Sweden, Skarsgård began landing roles in film, television and theatrical productions. While vacationing in the United States, he auditioned for and obtained the part of a mindless model in the 2001 film Zoolander, his first role in an American film. In 2003, his performance in Hundtricket-the Movie (The Dog Trick) earned him an Guldbagge Award nomination for Best Supporting Actor. He was named the Sexiest Man in Sweden five times.

He moved to Los Angeles in 2004 but continued to work in Sweden. His break came when he was cast as US Marine Brad Colbert in the HBO miniseries Generation Kill. An adaptation of journalist Evan Wright's book of the same name, Generation Kill follows the 1st Reconnaissance Battalion of the United States Marine Corps during the early part of the Iraq War. Director Susanna White wanted to cast him, but executive producer David Simon was not convinced he could do a convincing American accent. After four auditions in three cities, Skarsgård learned the role was his just 36 hours before he had to board a plane for Namibia where the project was filming. The cast and crew spent seven months in the desert there, shooting six days a week. Skarsgård worked with a dialect coach to master the American accent.

Just before leaving to shoot Generation Kill, Skarsgård heard about the development of True Blood, an HBO series based on The Southern Vampire Mysteries novels by Charlaine Harris, which chronicle the coexistence of humans and vampires in a town in Louisiana. Though initially reluctant about playing a vampire, he sent an audition tape for the role of Bill Compton on learning that screenwriter Alan Ball was behind the project. Skarsgård had been a fan of Ball's series Six Feet Under and film American Beauty. The role went to Stephen Moyer, but Skarsgård was cast as Eric Northman, a 1,000-year-old Nordic vampire. Northman first appeared in the first season's fourth episode, and the role brought Skarsgård to prominence. To inform his portrayal, he studied the work of actors Max Schreck and Bela Lugosi and the film Nosferatu (1922). He said that playing Northman appealed to his preference for characters who were not simply diabolical or righteous. True Blood ran on HBO from 2008 to 2014, receiving mixed reviews.

In 2009, Skarsgård appeared in the music video for pop singer Lady Gaga's "Paparazzi". He was the voice of Stefan in the 2009 animated film Metropia, directed by Tarik Saleh.

=== 2010s: Film and television success ===
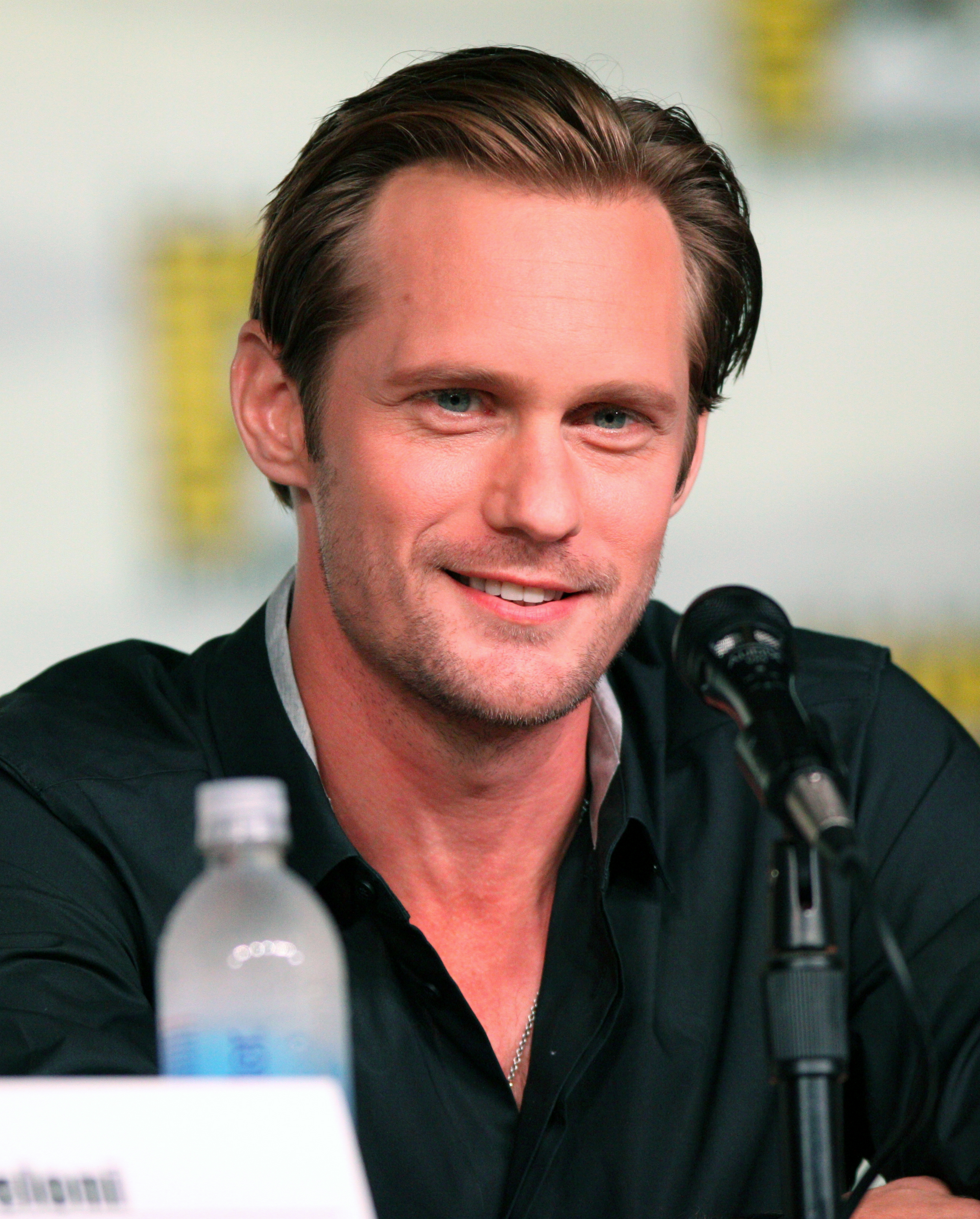
Skarsgård at the 2012 San Diego Comic-Con

In 2010, Skarsgård portrayed Terje, a gay Norwegian trekking to the North Pole, in the British mockumentary Beyond the Pole. Suit-maker Hickey Freeman chose Skarsgård to model a new look it debuted in 2010. Annie Leibovitz photographed the ad campaign, which appeared in The Wall Street Journal Magazine, GQ and Details. Skarsgård appeared on the cover of the September 2010 issue of Rolling Stone with his True Blood co-stars Anna Paquin and Stephen Moyer.

In 2011, Skarsgård starred in Melancholia, a film directed by Lars von Trier. He portrayed a newlywed alongside Kirsten Dunst as his wife in the film, which premiered at the 2011 Cannes Film Festival and also co-stars his father. That same year, he appeared in Straw Dogs, a remake of the 1971 film of the same name, as Charlie Venner. The remake's director, Rod Lurie, transferred the small town setting from Cornwall to Mississippi and described Venner as "an ex-football star gone to seed". The film co-starred James Marsden and Kate Bosworth, and was released 16 September 2011.

In 2012, Skarsgård appeared alongside Taylor Kitsch and Rihanna in Peter Berg's Battleship, an adaptation of the Hasbro game of the same name. Negatively reviewed by critics, the film had a dismal performance at the box office. He also appeared alongside Julianne Moore and Steve Coogan in Scott McGehee and David Siegel's film What Maisie Knew, an adaptation of the Henry James novel of the same name. He was also part of the ensemble cast in Henry Alex Rubin's thriller Disconnect, playing opposite Paula Patton. Skarsgård starred alongside Brit Marling and Elliot Page in Zal Batmanglij's 2013 film The East. He appeared in the film The Diary of a Teenage Girl as a man who begins an affair with his girlfriend's underage daughter. It was released in August 2015. In addition to being intentional about finding nuances in the character's predatory quality, Skarsgård admitted his excitement about playing the role "without justifying or condoning" his behavior. He starred in the 2016 film The Legend of Tarzan, portraying the title character, opposite Margot Robbie as Jane. Skarsgård worked out for 7 months to prepare for the part. The film did not generate success at the box office. It received mixed reviews, with Skarsgård's performance garnering praise. He next portrayed a deviant policeman in the black comedy film War on Everyone, which was released that same year.

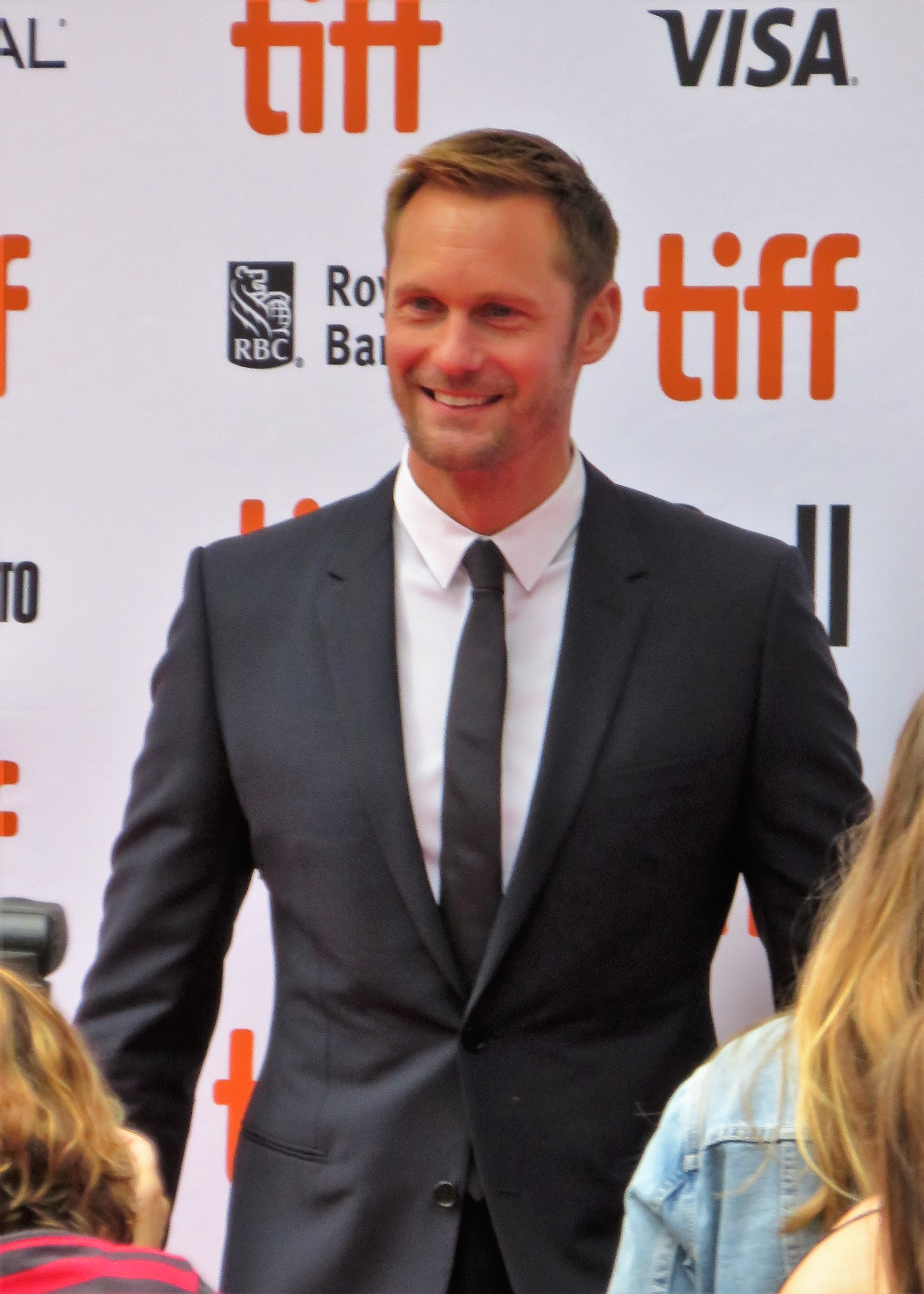
Skarsgård at the 2018 Toronto International Film Festival

From 2017 to 2019, Skarsgård starred in the drama series Big Little Lies as Perry Wright, an abusive husband to Nicole Kidman's character, Celeste. He described his character as violent due to internal conflicts involving his insecurities about needing his wife. The series earned universal acclaim. Reviewing the first-season finale, The Hollywood Reporter's Daniel Fienberg found Skarsgård's performance "utterly chilling". Skarsgård won the Primetime Emmy Award for Outstanding Supporting Actor in a Limited Series or Movie in 2017 for the role. He starred in the science fiction film Mute as a silent bartender in a futuristic society, which was released in February 2018. Later that year, he starred as a secretive man in The Little Drummer Girl, a miniseries that chronicles political violence in Europe in 1979. It received positive reviews. In 2019, he portrayed a sensitive German architect in The Aftermath, a film set in 1946 post-war Hamburg. He appeared in the romantic-comedy Long Shot as the prime minister of Canada. Critics were fond of the film, with The Guardian's Kristy Puchko commending Skarsgård in the minor role and how he "makes a meal out of it". Released in May 2019, it had an unsuccessful commercial performance.

=== 2020s: Continued success ===
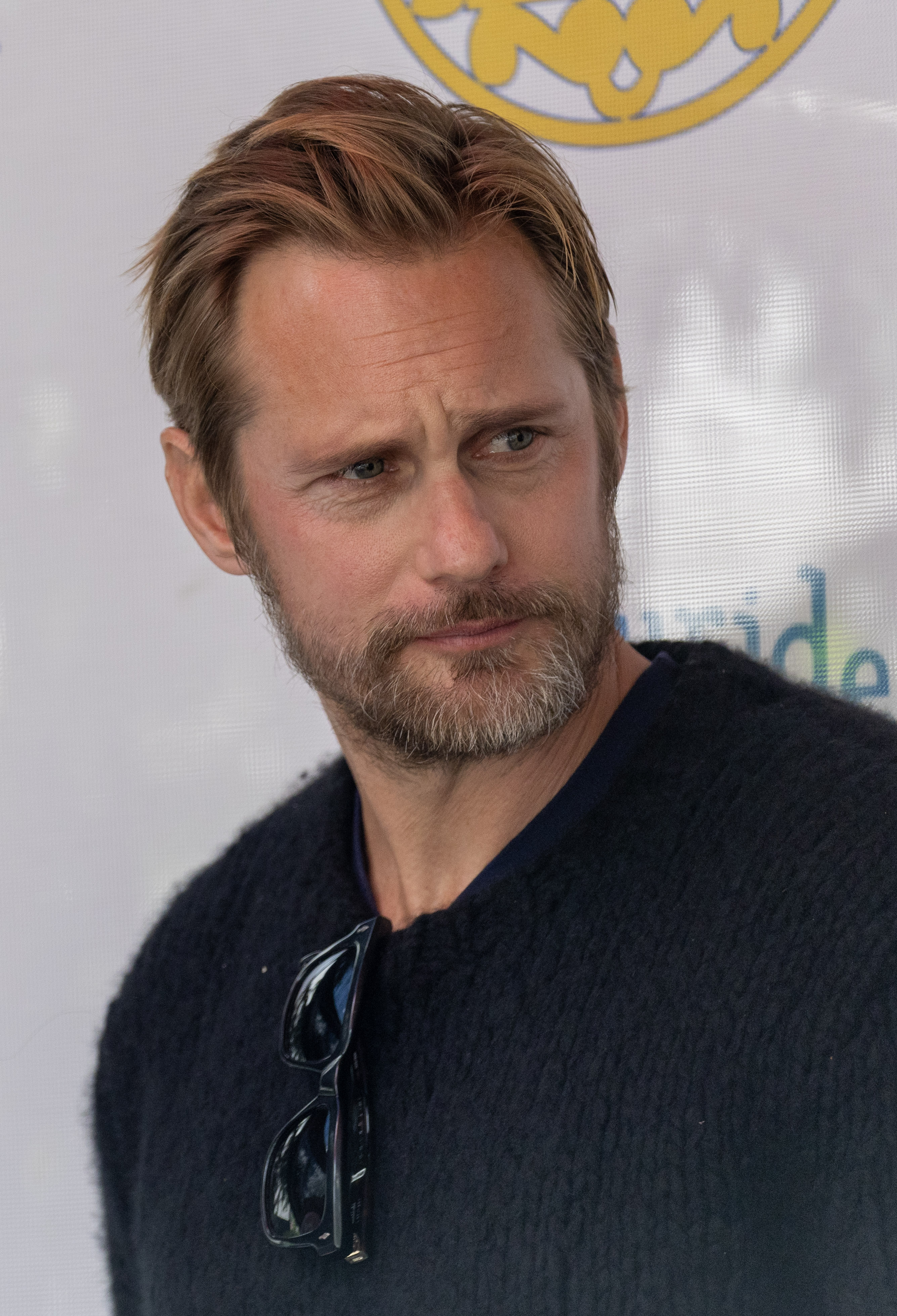
Skarsgård at the 2025 Telluride Film Festival

Skarsgård starred in The Stand, a CBS All Access miniseries based on the 1978 novel of the same name by Stephen King, portraying Randall Flagg, a charming demon. It ran from December 2020 to February 2021. He next starred in the 2021 monster film Godzilla vs. Kong, which earned positive reviews and commercial success. Skarsgård recurred during the third season of the comedy-drama series Succession as tech mogul Lukas Matsson, for which he received a nomination for the Primetime Emmy Award for Outstanding Guest Actor in a Drama Series. He portrayed Amleth in the epic film The Northman. Released in April 2022, the film garnered favorable reviews, with Richard Lawson of Vanity Fair deeming Skarsgård "a fine vessel for the film's opulent menace". In 2023, Skarsgård starred in the thriller Infinity Pool, and returned as Lukas Matsson for the fourth and final season of Succession. For his role as Matsson, Skarsgård was nominated for the Primetime Emmy Award for Outstanding Supporting Actor in a Drama Series in 2023.

In 2025, he played the title role in the science-fiction comedy series Murderbot on Apple TV+, and stars as a sexually dominant gay biker in the British film Pillion.

Skarsgård hosted the 1,000th episode of Saturday Night Live on 31 January 2026 with rapper Cardi B as the musical guest.

== Personal life ==
Skarsgård is an atheist, and a feminist. A football fan, Skarsgård supports Hammarby Fotboll, a club based in Stockholm, his birth city. In October 2010, he donated several autographed items to "Bajen Aid", the club's fundraising auction. In July 2011, he received an honorary degree from Leeds Metropolitan University, which he had attended.

Skarsgård was the ambassador for the American team for a Walking with the Wounded fundraising event for wounded soldiers. He trekked to the South Pole against teams representing the UK and Canada / Australia. A few days into the trek, it was decided that the competition part would be cancelled due to hazardous terrain and weather conditions, so the teams combined forces and continued together, and all three successfully reached the South Pole on 13 December 2013.

Skarsgård lived in the United States for 20 years; first in New York, then in Los Angeles while he was filming True Blood for seven years until he moved back to New York. In 2023, he relocated to Stockholm, Sweden. Skarsgård has a son, born in 2022, with Swedish actress Tuva Novotny, who lives in Denmark.

== Filmography ==
=== Film ===
Year	Title	Role	Notes
1984	Åke and His World	Kalle Nubb	
1989	The Dog That Smiled	Jojjo	
1999	Happy End	Bamse Viktorsson	
2000	The Diver	Ingmar	
2000	White Water Fury	Anders	
2000	Wings of Glass	Johan	
2001	Kites Over Helsinki	Robin Åström	
2001	Zoolander	Meekus	
2002	The Dog Trick	Robinson-Micke	
2003	To Kill a Child	Man	Short film; co-directed with Björne Larson
2004	Heartbeat	The Pilot	Short film
2005	Double Shift	Nisse	
2005	Om Sara	Kalle Öberg	
2006	The Last Drop	Lt. Jergen Voller	
2006	Never Be Mine	Christopher	
2006	Kill Your Darlings	Geert	
2006	Score	Micke	
2006	Exit	Fabian von Klerking	
2007	Järnets änglar	Stefan	
2009	Metropia	Stefan (voice)	
2009	Beyond the Pole	Terje	
2010	Trust Me	Alex	
2010	Moomins and the Comet Chase	Moomintroll (voice)	
2010	13	Jack	
2011	Straw Dogs	Charlie Venner	
2011	Melancholia	Michael	
2012	Battleship	Commander Stone Hopper	
2012	What Maisie Knew	Lincoln	
2012	Disconnect	Derek Hull	
2013	The East	Benji	
2014	The Giver	Jonas' Father	
2015	Hidden	Ray	
2015	The Diary of a Teenage Girl	Monroe Rutherford	
2016	Zoolander 2	Adam	Cameo
2016	War on Everyone	Terry Monroe	
2016	The Legend of Tarzan	Tarzan / John Clayton	
2018	Mute	Leo Beiler	
2018	The Hummingbird Project	Anton Zaleski	
2018	Hold the Dark	Vernon Slone	
2019	The Aftermath	Stefan Lubert	
2019	Long Shot	Prime Minister James Steward	
2019	The Kill Team	Sergeant Deeks	
2021	Passing	John Bellew	
2021	Godzilla vs. Kong	Nathan Lind	
2022	The Northman	Amleth	Also producer
2023	Infinity Pool	James Foster	Also executive producer
2023	Eric Larue	Ron LaRue	
2023	Lee	Roland Penrose	
2025	Pillion	Ray	
2026	The Moment	Johannes Godwin	
2026	Wicker	Wicker Husband	Also executive producer
2026	The Wolf Will Tear Your Immaculate Hands	The father	

=== Television ===
Year	Title	Role	Notes
1987	Idag röd	Fred	Television film
1999	Vita lögner	Marcus Englund	10 episodes
2000	D-dag	Lise's Stepson	Television film
2000	Judith	Ante Lindström	Episode: "Del 2"
2005	Revelations	Gunnar Eklind	Miniseries
2006	Cuppen	Micke	Television film
2007	Golden Brown Eyes	Boogey Knights Singer	2 episodes
2008	Generation Kill	Brad "Iceman" Colbert	Miniseries; 7 episodes
2008–2014	True Blood	Eric Northman	76 episodes
2013	Eastbound & Down	Adult Toby Powers	Episode: "Chapter 29"
2017–2019	Big Little Lies	Perry Wright	Main role
2018	Drunk History	James Dunn	Episode: "Heroines"
2018	The Little Drummer Girl	Gadi Becker	6 episodes
2019	On Becoming a God in Central Florida	Travis Stubbs	Episode: "The Stinker Thinker"
2020–2021	The Stand	Randall Flagg	Main role
2021–2023	Succession	Lukas Matsson	Recurring role (season 3), main cast (season 4)
2022	Atlanta	Himself	Episode: "Tarrare"
2022	The Kingdom	Svensk advokat	2 episodes
2022	Documentary Now!	Rainer Wolz	Episode: "Soldier of Illusion, Parts 1 & 2"
2024	Mr. & Mrs. Smith	Other John	Episode: "First Date"
2024	What We Do in the Shadows	Vampire	Episode: "Come Out and Play"
2025–present	Murderbot	Murderbot	Main role
2026	Saturday Night Live	Himself (host)	Episode: Alexander Skarsgård/Cardi B

=== Music videos ===
Year	Title	Role	Artist
2009	"Paparazzi"	Boyfriend	Lady Gaga
2013	"Free Your Mind"	Cult Leader	Cut Copy
2025	"A Season in Hell"	Running Man	These New Puritans
2026	"Mr Charm"	Mr. Charm	Rolling Stones

=== Audio ===
Year	Title	Role	Notes
2026	Felled	Wick	Main role

== Awards and nominations ==
Year	Award	Category	Nominated work	Result	Ref.
2003	Odense International Film Festival	Grand Prix	To Kill a Child	Won	
2003	Odense International Film Festival	Press Award	To Kill a Child	Won	
2003	Guldbagge Awards	Best Supporting Actor	Hundtricket — The Movie	Nominated	
2009	Scream Awards	Best Villain	True Blood	Won	
2009	Scream Awards	Best Television Ensemble	True Blood	Won	
2010	Screen Actors Guild Awards	Outstanding Performance by an Ensemble in a Drama Series	True Blood	Nominated	
2010	Saturn Awards	Best Supporting Actor in Television	True Blood	Nominated	
2010	NewNowNext Awards	Brink of Fame: Actor	True Blood	Nominated	
2010	Scream Awards	Best Television Performance	True Blood	Nominated	
2010	Scream Awards	Best Horror Actor	True Blood	Won	
2011	Teen Choice Awards	Choice Vampire	True Blood	Nominated	
2011	Scream Awards	Best Horror Actor	True Blood	Won	
2011	Scream Awards	Best Ensemble	True Blood	Won	
2011	Hamptons International Film Festival	Breakthrough Performer	Melancholia	Won	
2012	Robert Awards	Best Supporting Actor (Årets mandlige birolle)	Melancholia	Nominated	
2012	Fangoria Chainsaw Awards	Best Supporting Actor	Straw Dogs	Nominated	
2017	Primetime Emmy Awards	Outstanding Supporting Actor in a Limited Series or Television Movie	Big Little Lies	Won	
2018	Golden Globe Awards	Best Supporting Actor – Series, Miniseries or Television Film	Big Little Lies	Won	
2018	Satellite Awards	Best Supporting Actor in a Series, Miniseries or Film – Television	Big Little Lies	Nominated	
2018	Critics' Choice Television Awards	Best Supporting Actor in a Television Movie or Miniseries	Big Little Lies	Won	
2018	Screen Actors Guild Awards	Outstanding Male Actor in a Television Movie or Miniseries	Big Little Lies	Won	
2020	Screen Actors Guild Awards	Outstanding Ensemble in a Drama Series	Big Little Lies	Nominated	
2022	Primetime Emmy Awards	Outstanding Guest Actor in a Drama Series	Succession	Nominated	
2023	Primetime Emmy Awards	Outstanding Supporting Actor in a Drama Series	Succession	Nominated	
2024	Golden Globe Awards	Best Supporting Actor – Series, Miniseries, or Television Film	Succession	Nominated	
2024	Screen Actors Guild Awards	Outstanding Ensemble in a Drama Series	Succession	Won	
2024	Canadian Screen Awards	Best Lead Performance in a Drama Film	Infinity Pool	Nominated	
2025	Gotham Independent Film Awards	Outstanding Supporting Performance	Pillion	Nominated	
2025	British Independent Film Awards	Best Supporting Performance	Pillion	Nominated	
2025	New York Film Critics Online Awards	Best Supporting Actor	Pillion	Nominated	
2025	London Film Critics Circle Awards	Supporting Actor of the Year	Pillion	Nominated	
2025	Stockholm International Film Festival	Stockholm Achievement Award (Note: For showing a rare ability to move seamlessly between Hollywood productions, European arthouse, and award winning tv-series)	Himself	Honored	
2025	Critics' Choice Awards	Best Actor in a Comedy Series	Murderbot	Nominated	

== See also ==
- List of atheists in film, radio, television and theater
- List of Golden Globe winners
- List of Primetime Emmy Award winners
