= Nathaniel Fick =

American diplomat, executive, author, and military officer (born 1977)

Nate Fick
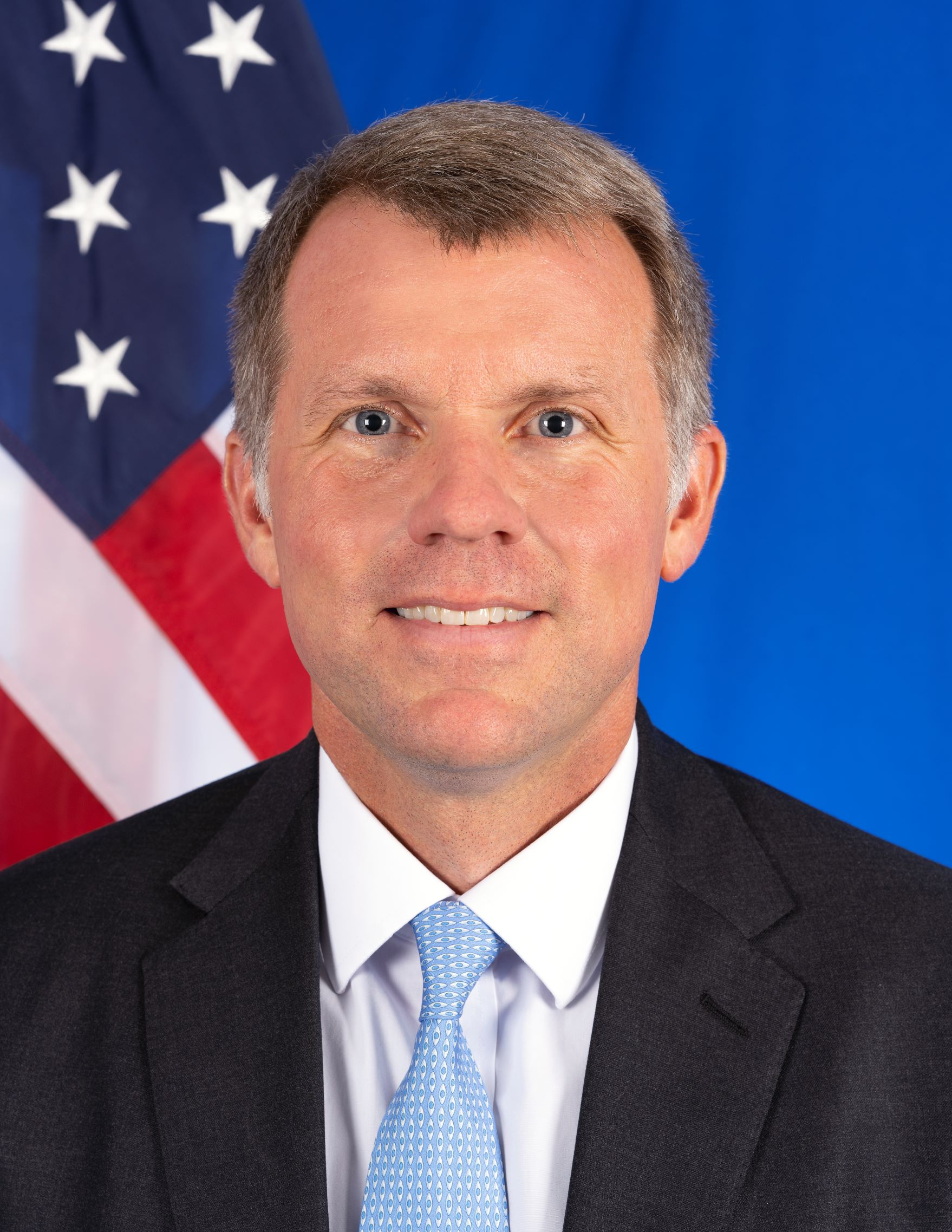

1st Ambassador-at-Large for Cyberspace and Digital Policy
- In office September 21, 2022 – January 20, 2025
- President: Joe Biden
- Preceded by: Position established
- Succeeded by: Adam Cassady

Personal details
- Born: June 23, 1977 (age 49) Baltimore, Maryland, U.S.
- Education: Dartmouth College (BA); Harvard University (MPA, MBA)

Military service
- Allegiance: United States
- Branch/service: United States Marine Corps
- Years of service: 1999–2003
- Rank: Captain
- Commands: Weapons Platoon, Bravo Company, 1st Battalion, 1st Marines; 2nd Platoon, Bravo Company, 1st Reconnaissance Battalion
- Battles/wars: International Force East Timor; Global War on Terrorism; War in Afghanistan; Iraq War

Nathaniel Charles Fick (born June 23, 1977) is an investor and technology executive, a former American diplomat, an author, and a former United States Marine Corps officer. He is the Chief Strategy Officer for Equities at Cerberus Capital Management. He was the CEO of cybersecurity software company Endgame, Inc., then worked for Elastic NV after it acquired Endgame. He was an Operating Partner at Bessemer Venture Partners. In 2022, he was selected to lead the U.S. State Department's Bureau of Cyberspace and Digital Policy. He left the position in 2025.

Fick is the author of One Bullet Away: The Making of a Marine Officer, a memoir of his military experience published in 2005 that was a New York Times bestseller, one of The Washington Post's "Best Books of the Year", and one of the Military Times' "Best Military Books of the Decade". Fick was portrayed by actor Stark Sands in the HBO miniseries Generation Kill.

== Early life and education ==
Fick was born in Baltimore, Maryland, in 1977, to Nathaniel Crow Fick Jr, a lawyer that ran a private practice and Jane Ella Fick (Née Stimola) a social worker. He was the first of three siblings having two sisters Maureen Poydras, a lawyer who went into private practice with their father, and Stephanie Noelle. Fick attended Loyola Blakefield high school in Towson, Maryland. Fick went on to attend Dartmouth College. He later graduated with degrees in classics and government in 1999. While at Dartmouth, Fick captained the cycling team to a U.S. National Championship and wrote a senior thesis on Thucydides' History of the Peloponnesian War and its implications for American foreign policy. After leaving the Marine Corps, Fick earned both an MPA and MBA from Harvard University.

== Career ==
In 1998, after his junior year at Dartmouth, Fick attended the United States Marine Corps Officer Candidates School and was commissioned a second lieutenant upon graduating from college on June 12, 1999.

Fick was trained as an infantry officer and was eventually assigned as a platoon commander to 1st Battalion 1st Marines. He was an officer in the Amphibious Ready Group of the 15th Marine Expeditionary Unit based in Darwin, Northern Territory, training with the Australian Army for humanitarian operations deployment to East Timor until the September 11 attacks. He then led his platoon into Afghanistan for Operation Enduring Freedom to support the war on terror. Upon his return to the United States in March 2002, he was recommended for Marine reconnaissance training. He also completed Army Airborne School. He subsequently led Second Platoon of Bravo Company of the 1st Reconnaissance Battalion during the invasion of Iraq in 2003.

Fick left the U.S. Marine Corps as a captain in December 2003, and used the GI Bill to attend Harvard Business School and the Harvard Kennedy School. He came to public notice for his writing on military life and the conflicts in Afghanistan and Iraq. His memoir One Bullet Away was a New York Times bestseller, one of The Washington Post's "Best Books of the Year," and won the Colby Award in 2006.

Fick became the chief operating officer (COO) at the Center for a New American Security in 2008 and later was appointed CEO in June 2009.

He was elected to Dartmouth College's board of trustees in April 2012 and served for eight years.

Fick served as the CEO of cybersecurity software company Endgame from 2012 through its acquisition by search company Elastic in 2019, when he became the general manager of Elastic's information security business globally. He was recognized in 2018 by Fast Company magazine as one of the "Most Creative People in Business."

He testified before the United States Senate on Iraq and spoke at the 2008 Democratic National Convention in Denver on August 28, 2008, the night Barack Obama accepted the presidential nomination.

He has served on the Military & Veterans Advisory Council at JPMorgan Chase & Co.

=== Ambassador at Large for Cyberspace & Digital Policy ===
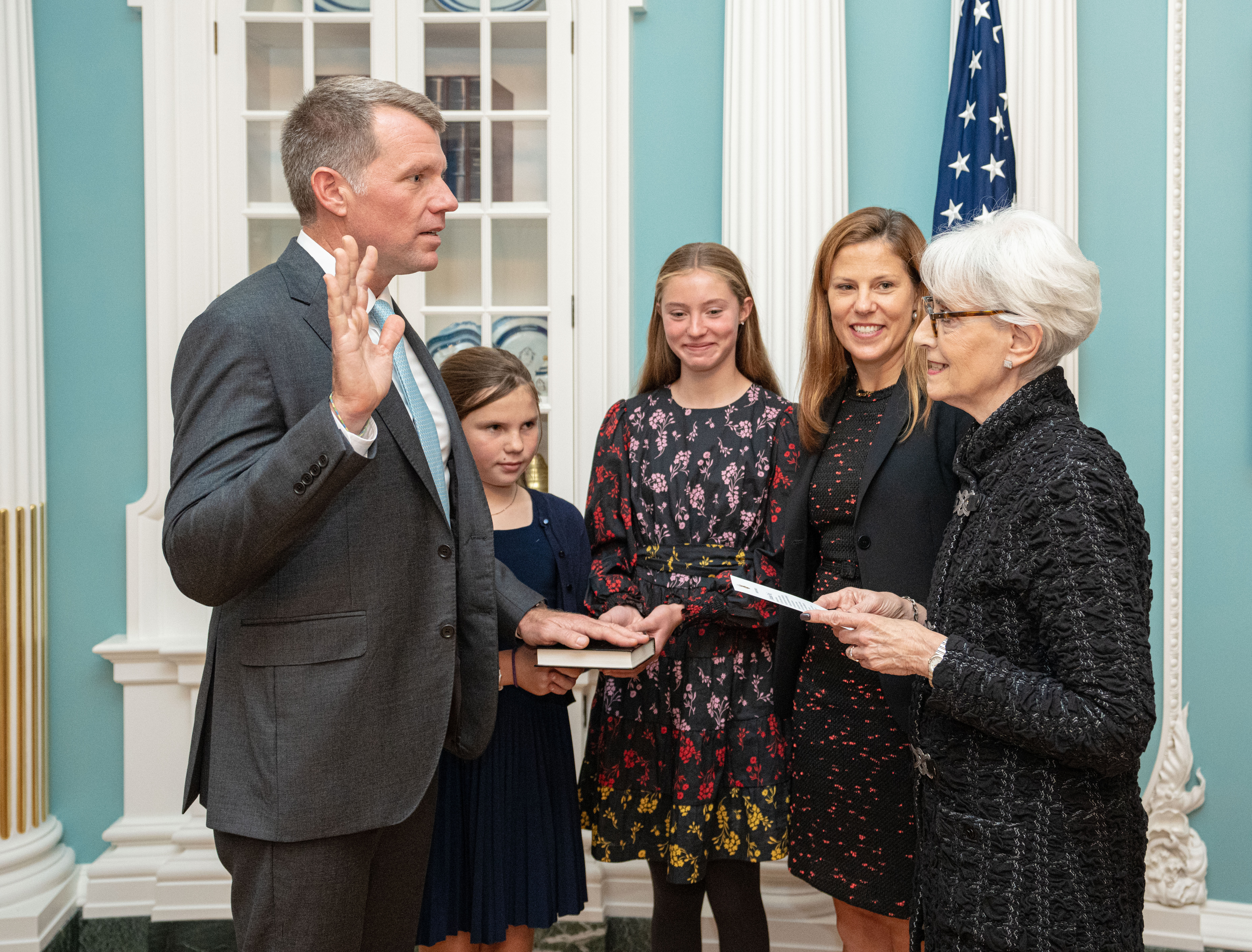
Fick sworn in as Ambassador at Large for Cyberspace and Digital Policy in 2022

On June 3, 2022, Fick was nominated as the U.S. State Department’s first Ambassador-at-Large for Cyberspace and Digital Policy, leading U.S. diplomacy on cybersecurity, digital, and emerging technology issues. Hearings on his nomination were held before the Senate Foreign Relations Committee on August 3, 2022. The committee favorably reported his nomination to the Senate floor on September 14. The full Senate confirmed Fick's nomination on September 15 by voice vote, and he was sworn in on September 21.

On February 4, 2023, Fick announced that his personal Twitter account had been hacked. He called the incident one of the "perils of the job". It was unclear who hacked the account or if any unauthorized tweets were being sent from the account.

He led U.S. delegations in venues around the world focused on A.I. governance, following the release of ChatGPT. In November 2023, Ambassador Fick testified before the United States Senate Foreign Relations Committee on U.S. diplomacy in support of the responsible governance of artificial intelligence.

In February 2024, he traveled to Kyiv, Ukraine with Director Jen Easterly of the Cybersecurity and Infrastructure Security Agency to reaffirm American support for Ukraine's digital defense even as the U.S. Congress delayed funding the supplemental appropriation. They held a public event upon their return at the German Marshall Fund of the United States in Washington, DC.

Ambassador Fick and his team led the creation of the U.S. International Cyberspace and Digital Policy Strategy, released by Secretary of State Antony Blinken at the RSA Conference in San Francisco on May 6, 2024. Fick discussed the strategy publicly at a forum hosted by the Council on Foreign Relations later that week. Fick left his position upon Donald Trump taking office. Before leaving office, Fick gave an interview to Wired warning against complacency in the battle over cyberspace with China and Russia.

== Personal life ==
He resides in Maine with his wife, Margaret Angell, and two daughters.

== In popular culture ==
Fick and his platoon were the subjects of a series of articles in Rolling Stone and the book Generation Kill by the embedded journalist Evan Wright. The articles won the National Magazine Award in 2003. Generation Kill was adapted by David Simon and Ed Burns into a miniseries of the same name for HBO, in which Fick is portrayed by Stark Sands.

== See also ==
- List of United States Marines
- Members of the Council on Foreign Relations
