= One Bullet Away =

Autobiography by Nathaniel Fick

One Bullet Away: The Making of a Marine Officer
- Author: Nathaniel Fick
- Language: English
- Genre: Memoir
- Publisher: Houghton-Mifflin
- Publication date: 2005
- Publication place: United States
- Media type: Print (Paperback)
- Pages: 372
- ISBN: 0-618-55613-3

One Bullet Away: The Making of a Marine Officer is an autobiography by Nathaniel Fick, published by Houghton-Mifflin in 2005. An account of Nathaniel Fick's time in the United States Marine Corps, it begins with his experiences at Officer Candidate's School in Quantico, Virginia and details his deployments to Afghanistan and Iraq during the war on terror.

In 2006, Recorded Books published an unabridged audiobook edition (ISBN 978-1-41937595-8), narrated by Andy Paris.

== Awards ==
One Bullet Away won the Barnes & Noble Discover Great New Writers Award for nonfiction in 2005. The following year, Nathaniel Fick received the Colby Award.
