= Squatting in Brazil =

Brazil on globe

Squatting in Brazil is the occupation of unused or derelict buildings or land without the permission of the owner. After attempting to eradicate slums in the 1960s and 1970s, local governments transitioned to a policy of toleration. Cities such as Recife, Rio de Janeiro and São Paulo have large informal settlements known as favelas. A more recent phenomenon is the occupation of buildings in city centres by organised groups. In rural areas across the country, the Landless Workers' Movement (MST) arranges large land occupations.

== Legality ==
The Brazilian Constituent Assembly of 1988 enshrined the right to housing in the constitution. It is possible to claim adverse possession after five years, under the principle of usucapião. In the case of the Mauá building in São Paulo, the squatters requested adverse possession in 2012 but the owner had made a claim for possession four days before the five year limit, despite the building having been derelict for two decades. By 2015, the city council had decided to buy the building and convert it to social housing.

== Favela ==
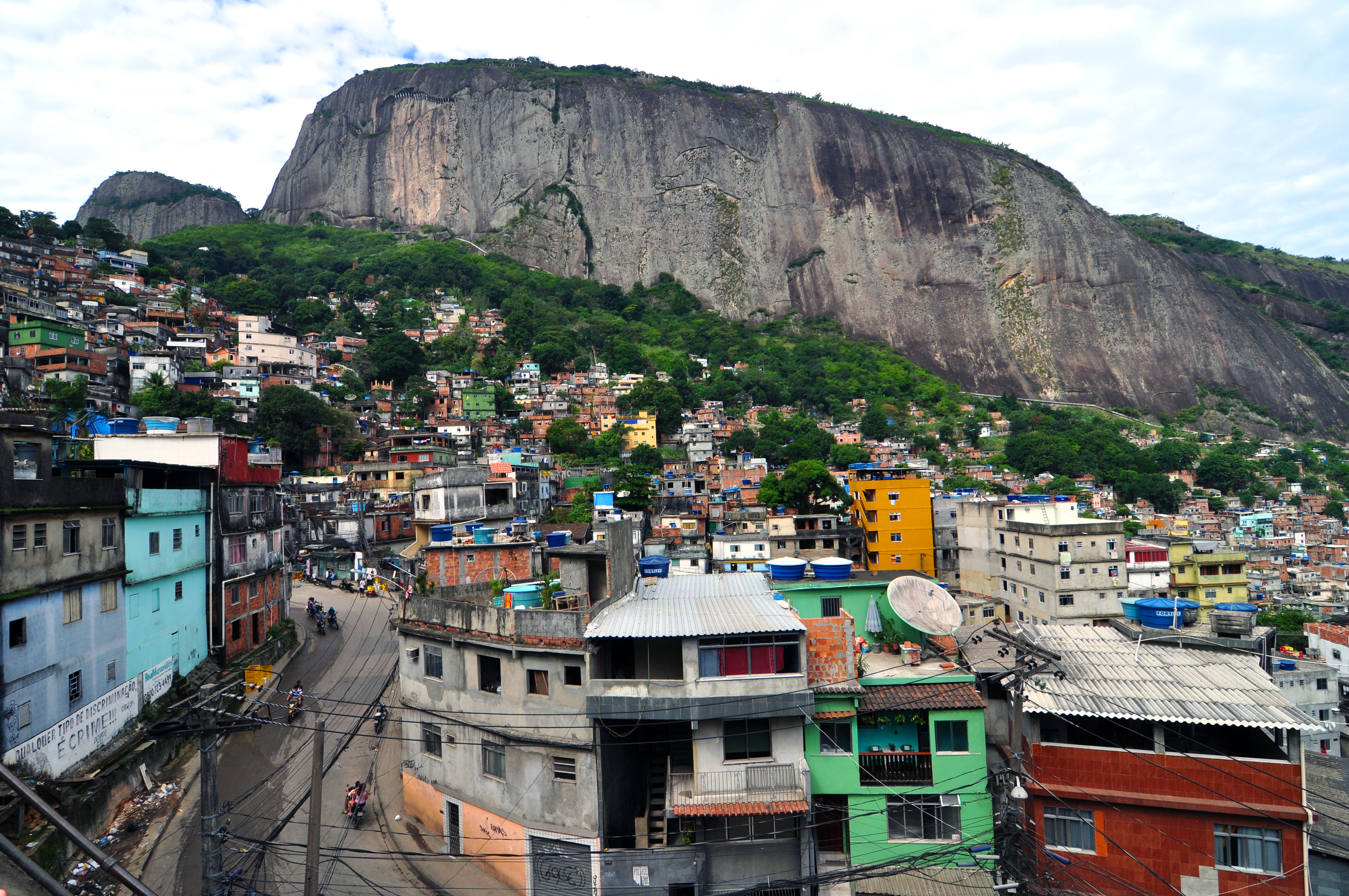
Rocinha in 2010

After failed attempts in the 1960s and 1970s to bulldoze slums out of existence, the authorities moved towards a policy of toleration. Urban informal settlements are known as favelas. The 2010 census showed that around 11.25 million people, or 6 per cent of the total population, lived in favelas. Favelas will often lack utilities to begin with; in Rio de Janeiro most favela homes have running water and 99 per cent have electricity. A famous example in Rio is Rocinha, where the 2010 census reported the population to be 70,000 and unofficial estimates put the real figure as high as 180,000. In Recife, the state capital of Pernambuco in the northeast of the country, 193 favelas were listed in 1985 and half of the entire population of the city was squatting. In São Paulo, until 1972 favelas were usually demolished then afterwards they were permitted, meaning that in the next decade the number of squatters rose to one million. The largest favela is Heliópolis, with over 200,000 inhabitants as of 2018. It has been officially recognized as a regular neighborhood of the city.

There were 25 million people living in favelas across Brazil, as of 2004.

== Inner city occupations ==
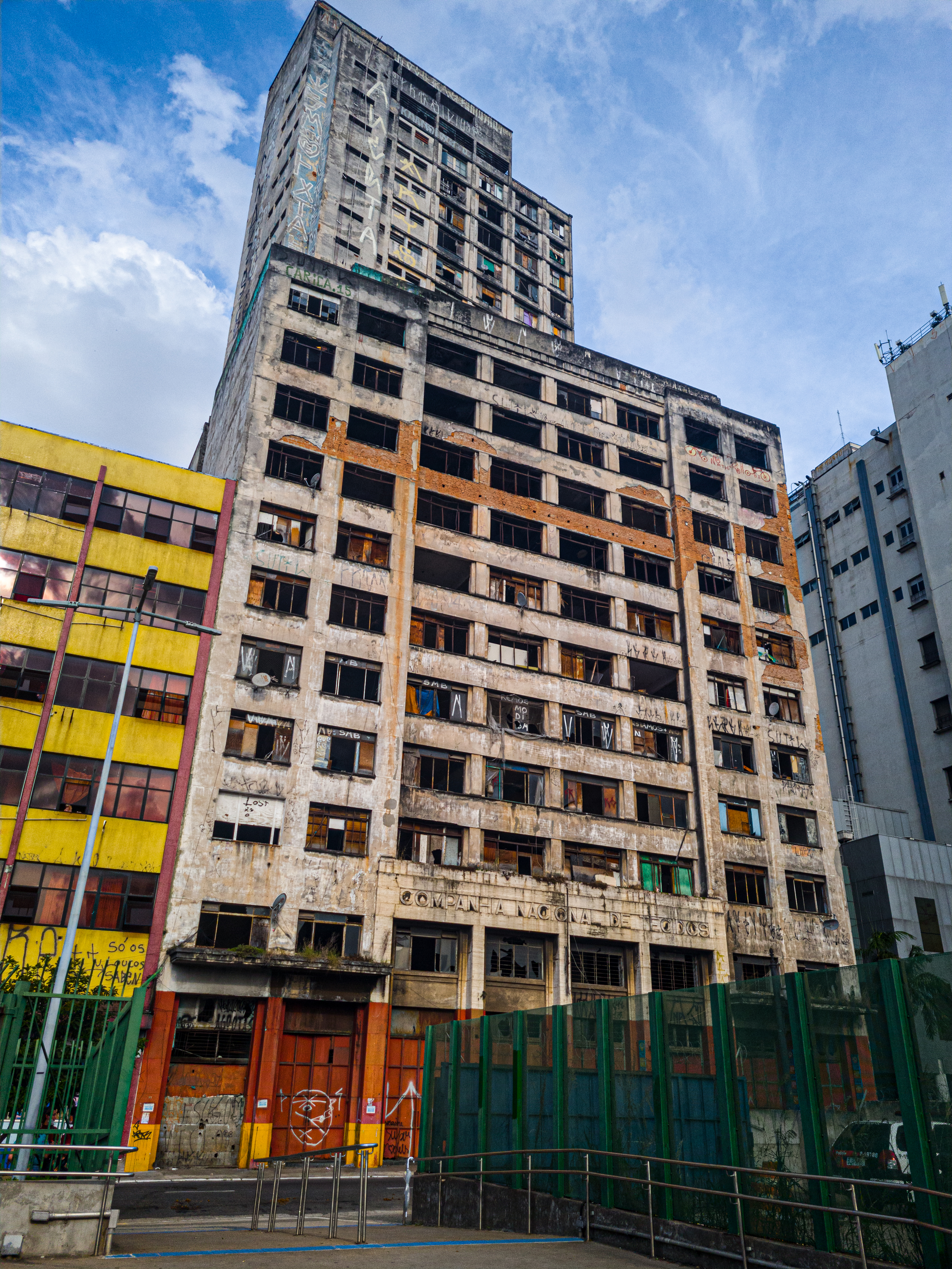
Prestes Maia in 2022

A new form of occupation began in the early 1990s in São Paulo and quickly spread to other cities. Housing activists began to squat buildings in the city centre, inspired by the thinking of Paulo Freire and Henri Lefebvre. Between 1997 and 2012, 120 buildings were occupied in central São Paulo. Each squat is run by assembly and collects rent to pay for maintenance and utilities. Having begun under the umbrella of the União dos Movimentos de Moradia (UMM or Union of Housing Movements), by the late 1990s different groups had been formed such as the Frente de Luta por Moradia (FLM, or Front for the Housing Struggle), the Movimento dos Trabalhadores Sem Teto (MTST or Homeless Workers' Movement) and the Downtown Roofless Movement (MSTC). The MTST began in Campinas and is inspired by the MST. The economic crisis which began in 2014 created additional problems for these housing movements.

One notable example was a 22-storey building called Prestes Maia, whose inhabitants were ordered to leave in 2006. The former Hotel Santos Dumont on Mauá Street, also in the Luz neighbourhood was occupied in 2007 after being derelict for 17 years. An estimated 1,000 people were living in the building, paying a small amount every month to cover maintenance. The community expels people who fight, use drugs or abuse alcohol.

== Rural occupations ==
There are also rural squatter movements in Brazil, such as the Landless Workers' Movement (MST). The MST was formed from 1979 onwards and organises land occupations. For example, in Pontal do Paraná in the state of Paraná 112 occupations were carried out, housing 6,500 families. The MST joined Via Campesina in 1996.

== In popular culture ==
The Cambridge Squatter (Brazilian Portuguese: Era o Hotel Cambridge) is a 2016 film directed by Eliane Caffé. Set in a squatted hotel in São Paulo, it mixes real-life squatters with well-known actors such as José Dumont and Suely Franco to tell the story of resisting an eviction.

== See also ==
- Cortiço
- Pichação
