= List of Brazilian films of 1984 =

A list of films produced in Brazil in 1984:

Title	Director	Cast	Genre	Notes
Agüenta, Coração	Reginaldo Faria	Reginaldo Faria, Christiane Torloni, Osmar Prado, Cristina Aché	Comedy	
Águia na Cabeça	Paulo Thiago	Nuno Leal Maia, Christiane Torloni, Zezé Motta, Jece Valadão	Drama	
Amenic - Entre o Discurso e a Prática	Fernando Silva	Joel Barcellos, Paula Gaitán, Aldine Müller, Lady Francisco	Drama	
Amor Maldito	Adélia Sampaio	Monique Lafond, Wilma Dias	Drama	
Amor Voraz	Walter Hugo Khouri	Vera Fischer, Márcia Rodrigues, Bianca Byington	Drama	
O Analista de Taras Deliciosas	Fauzi Mansur	Alan Fontaine, Oasis Minniti, Meire Belagosa	Pornographic	
A B... Profunda	Álvaro Moya	Iris Peralta, Jayme Cardoso, Débora Muniz	Pornochanchada	
Bacanais Sem Fim	Victor Triunfo	Antonio Rody, Paula Sanches	Drama	
O Baiano Fantasma	Denoy de Oliveira	José Dumont, Regina Dourado, Luiz Carlos Gomes	Drama	
Bete Balanço	Lael Rodrigues	Débora Bloch, Lauro Corona	Musical, drama	
Boi Aruá	Chico Liberato		Animated	
O Cavalinho Azul	Eduardo Escorel	Pedro de Brito	Fantasy	
Coisas Eróticas 2	Raffaele Rossi	Arnaldo Fernandes, Aryadne de Lima, Eliane Gabarron, Elizabeth Bacelar, Jussara Calmon	Pornographic	
Espelho de Carne	Antonio Carlos da Fontoura	Hileana Menezes, Denis Carvalho, Maria Zilda Bethlem, Daniel Filho, Joana Fomm	Erotic	
A Filha dos Trapalhões	Dedé Santana	Os Trapalhões, Myrian Rios	Comedy	The most watched Brazilian film in 1984
Garota Dourada	Antônio Calmon	Bianca Byington, André De Biase, Roberto Bataglin	Adventure	
Ivone, a Rainha do Pecado	Francisco Cavalcanti	Francisco Cavalcanti, Dalma Ribas, Zilda Mayo, Jussara Calmon	Erotic	
Jango	Sílvio Tendler	José Wilker (narration)	Documentary	As of 2007, the sixth most watched Brazilian documentary
Memoirs of Prison	Nelson Pereira dos Santos	Carlos Vereza	Drama	
A Menina e o Cavalo	Conrado Sanchez	Aryadne de Lima, Antonio Rody	Pornographic	
Noites do Sertão	Carlos Alberto Prates Correia	Débora Bloch, Cristina Aché	Drama	
Nunca Fomos tão Felizes	Murilo Salles	Cláudio Marzo, Roberto Bataglin	Drama	
Oh! Rebuceteio	Cláudio Cunha	Cláudio Cunha, Eleni Bandettini, Jayme Cardoso	Pornographic	
Para Viver um Grande Amor	Miguel Faria, Jr.	Djavan, Patricia Pillar	Musical, romance	
Quilombo	Carlos Diegues	Antônio Pompêo, Zezé Motta, Tony Tornado, Vera Fischer	Drama	Entered into the 1984 Cannes Film Festival
Shock	Jair Correia	Cláudia Alencar, Aldine Müller, Elias Andreatto, Kiko Guerra, Taumaturgo Ferreira, Mayara Magri	Horror	The first and only (as of 2010) slasher film made in Brazil
Sole nudo	Tonino Cervi	David Brandon, Tânia Alves, Paolo Bonacelli	Comedy	
Os Trapalhões e o Mágico de Oróz	Dedé Santana, Vitor Lustosa	Os Trapalhões	Comedy	Wizard of Oz parody
Twenty Years Later	Eduardo Coutinho		Documentary	
Verdes Anos	Carlos Gerbase, Giba Assis Brasil	Werner Schünemann, Márcia do Canto, Marcos Breda	Drama	
Volúpia de Mulher	John Doo	Helena Ramos, Vanessa Alves	Pornochanchada	

== See also ==
- 1984 in Brazil
- 1984 in Brazilian television
