= Prestes Maia =

Prestes Maia may refer to:

- Francisco Prestes Maia, urban planner and mayor of São Paulo
- Prestes Maia (building), a highrise squat in downtown São Paulo
