= Clayton Hill =

Clayton Hill may refer to:

- Clayton Hill (Antarctica), a hill on Petermann Island, Graham Land
- Clayton Hill (actor) (1931–2009), an American actor
- Clayton Hill (drummer), a Canadian drummer best known for being a member of the Canadian rock band Trooper
- Clayton Hill (Nazeing), a park in Nazeing, Essex, England
