= Ana Miranda =

Brazilian poet and novelist (born 1951)

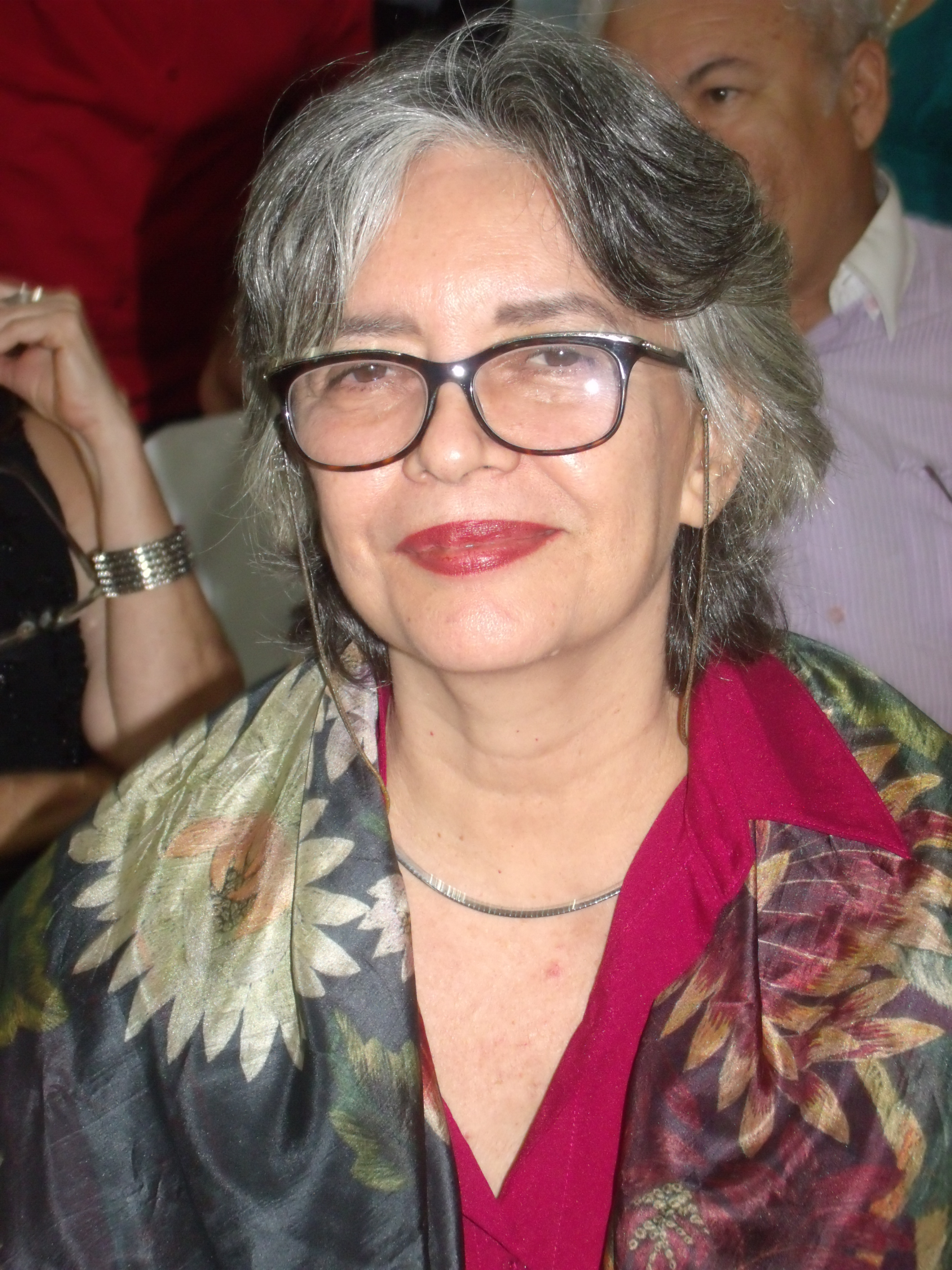
- Born: Ana Maria Nóbrega Miranda; August 19, 1951 (age 74); Fortaleza, Brazil
- Occupations: Poet and novelist
- Notable work: A Boca do Inferno

Ana Miranda (born August 19, 1951) is a Brazilian poet and novelist.

== Biography ==
She was born in Fortaleza, Ceará, Brazil on August 19, 1951. She grew up in Brasília and has lived in Rio de Janeiro since 1969. Her main work of note has been historical, including her award-winning 1989 novel A Boca do Inferno, which was published in English in 1991. Many of her other works have concerned the conflicts of women wanting to have careers and families.

== Film adaptions ==
The film Desmundo by Alain Fresnot is an adaption of her novel of the same name.
