= The Fish That Saved Pittsburgh =

1979 film by Gilbert Moses

- Directed by: Gilbert Moses
- Screenplay by: Jaison Starkes; Edmond Stevens
- Story by: David Dashev; Gary Stromberg
- Produced by: David Dashev; Gary Stromberg
- Starring: Julius Erving; Jonathan Winters; Meadowlark Lemon; Jack Kehoe; Kareem Abdul-Jabbar; Margaret Avery; James Bond III; Michael V. Gazzo; Peter Isacksen; Nicholas Pryor; M. Emmet Walsh; Stockard Channing; Flip Wilson
- Cinematography: Frank Stanley
- Edited by: Frank Mazzola; Peter Zinner
- Music by: Thom Bell
- Production company: Lorimar Productions
- Distributed by: United Artists
- Release date: November 6, 1979
- Running time: 102 minutes
- Country: United States
- Language: English
- Budget: $4 million
- Box office: $8.3 million

The Fish That Saved Pittsburgh is a 1979 American sports/fantasy comedy film directed by Gilbert Moses and coproduced by David Dashev and Gary Stromberg. It was produced by Lorimar and distributed by United Artists.

The film was shot on location in Pittsburgh and at Pittsburgh's Civic Arena, as well as in suburban Moon Township, Pennsylvania.

The film has attracted a cult following, most notably for its disco-inspired setting and soundtrack, as well as the appearances of many NBA stars (including lead actor Julius Erving) and early roles for Debbie Allen, Stockard Channing and Harry Shearer. The film also contains a cameo by longtime Pittsburgh mayor Richard Caliguiri.

== Plot ==
The Pittsburgh Pythons are a struggling professional basketball team whose continuous losing streak and lack of talent has made them the laughing stock of the city. Several players ask to be traded to other teams because of the bad publicity and the presence of difficult but highly paid star player Moses Guthrie.

Believing that the team needs a miracle, ballboy Tyrone Millman turns to astrology to improve the team's fortunes. He brings his idea to astrologer Mona Mondieu, and they devise the perfect concept: a team composed entirely of players born under Guthrie's astrological sign of Pisces. The team is reborn as the Pittsburgh Pisces.

Although Tyrone's sister and Guthrie think that the idea is absurd, they ultimately embrace the concept. The plan succeeds because of the new team's eccentric skills, teamwork and Mona's astrological readings, culminating in a championship opportunity.

== Cast ==
- Julius Erving as Moses Guthrie
- Jonathan Winters as H.S. and Harvey Tilson
- Meadowlark Lemon as Rev. Grady Jackson
- Jack Kehoe as Setshot
- Margaret Avery as Toby Millman
- James Bond III as Tyrone Millman
- Michael V. Gazzo as Harry the Trainer
- Peter Isacksen as Driftwood
- Dwayne Mooney as Benny Rae
- Daryl Mooney as Kenny Rae
- Nicholas Pryor as George Brockington
- M. Emmet Walsh as Wally Cantrell
- Stockard Channing as Mona Mondieu
- Flip Wilson as Coach 'Jock' Delaney
- Debbie Allen as Ola
- Dee Dee Bridgewater as Brandy
- Julius Carry as Malik Jamal Truth
- Jerry Chambers as Lucian Tucker
- Jessie Lawrence Ferguson as Jackhammer Washington
- Malek Abdul Mansour as Bullet Haines
- Richard Foronjy as Mike
- Clayton Hill as Security Guard
- Eric Mercury as Rudy and League Commissioner
- Branscombe Richmond as Winston Running Hawk
- Joe Seneca as Mr. Sweets
- Harry Shearer as Murray Sports

=== As themselves ===
- Marv Albert
- Chick Hearn
- The Sylvers
- The Spinners (as Deacon Smith and featured Singers)
- Gene Steratore, Sr. as Referee

=== Basketball teams ===
Los Angeles:

- Jerry Tarkanian as coach (also the film's consultant)
- Ron Carter
- Connie Hawkins
- Lou Hudson
- Kareem Abdul-Jabbar
- Luther Rackley
- Norm Nixon

New York:

- Alfred Beard Jr.
- Luther "Ticky" Burden
- Spencer Haywood
- Lonnie Shelton
- Mychal Thompson

Boston:

- John Williamson
- Donald Chaney
- Cedric "Cornbread" Maxwell
- Kevin Stacom
- Curtis Rowe

Detroit:

- Leon Douglas
- Christopher J. Ford
- Bob Lanier
- John Shumate
- Eric Money
- Kevin Porter

== Production ==
Singer/actress Cher was originally cast as Mona Mondieu, but she withdrew at the last minute. Singer/actress Dee Dee Bridgewater, who plays Brandy, previously won a Tony Award for her role as Glinda in The Wiz on Broadway also under the direction of Gilbert Moses, whom she later married.

The Spinners recorded two songs for the film. Actress/choreographer Debbie Allen and athlete Norm Nixon, who married in 1984, both appear in the film.

Despite popular belief, Julius Erving's character's name of Moses was not chosen in reference to teammate Moses Malone, as Erving and Malone would not become teammates until four years later.

== Novelization ==
A novelization written by Richard Woodley, based upon an early draft of the screenplay by Jaison Starkes and Edmond Stevens, was released in 1979. The novel differs in several respects from the film. In the film, the Pisces win every game, but in the novel, the team loses twice. The novel describes a group of people in wheelchairs causing havoc at a Pisces game, a scene that appears in the film's preview trailer but not in the final release.

== Home media ==
In 2010, Warner Home Video released the film on DVD and digital download as part of its Warner Archive Collection.

In addition, the film is also made available for streaming online on Plex, The Roku Channel, and Tubi.

== See also ==
- List of basketball films
