= Mick Audsley =

British film and television editor

- Born: 23 June 1949 (age 77); Rochester, England, United Kingdom
- Occupation: Film editor
- Years active: 1976–present
- Spouse: Joke van Wijk (m. 1987)
- Awards: BAFTA TV Award for Best Film or Video Editor (Fiction/Entertainment); 1993 Screen Two

Mick Audsley (born 23 June 1949 in Rochester, England) is a British film and television editor with more than thirty film credits. He is a frequent collaborator of directors Mike Newell and Stephen Frears, having edited 15 films for Frears.

== Life and career ==
Audsley was educated at Sevenoaks School, a boarding independent school in the town of Sevenoaks in Kent, in South East England. He then attended Hornsey College of Art and the Royal College of Art where he worked as a sound and then picture editor on various projects for the BFI Production Board. Audsley is married to fellow editor Joke van Wijk, together they have two children.

Audsley has had a notable collaboration with the director Stephen Frears from 1982 to present. In 1988, Audsley was nominated for the BAFTA Award for Best Editing for Dangerous Liaisons, and the BAFTA TV Award for The Snapper both of which were directed by Frears. Audsley also has had a comparably extended collaboration with director Mike Newell editing for films such as Harry Potter and the Goblet of Fire, Love in the Time of Cholera and Prince of Persia: The Sands of Time.

== Filmography ==
Year	Film	Director	Notes
1976	King Lear	Steven Rumbelow	
1978	My Way Home	Bill Douglas	
1978	News from Nowhere	Alister Hallum	
1980	Brothers and Sisters	Richard Woolley	
1980	Schiele in Prison	Mick Gold	
1981	Mark Gertler: Fragments of a Biography	Phil Mulloy	
1982	An Unsuitable Job for a Woman	Chris Petit	
1982	The Privilege	Ian Knox	Short film
1982	Walter	Stephen Frears	Television film
1983	Walter & June	Stephen Frears	Television film
1983	R.H.I.N.O.; Really Here in Name Only	Jane Howell	Television film
1983	The Terence Davies Trilogy	Terence Davies	Edited the segment "Madonna and Child"
1984	The Cold Room	James Dearden	Television film
1984	The Hit	Stephen Frears	
1985	Dance with a Stranger	Mike Newell	
1985	My Beautiful Laundrette	Stephen Frears	
1986	Comrades	Bill Douglas	
1987	Prick Up Your Ears	Stephen Frears	
1987	Sammy and Rosie Get Laid	Stephen Frears	
1988	Soursweet	Mike Newell	
1988	Dangerous Liaisons	Stephen Frears	Nominated — BAFTA Award for Best Editing
1989	We're No Angels	Neil Jordan	
1990	The Grifters	Stephen Frears	
1992	Hero	Stephen Frears	
1993	Screen Two	Stephen Frears	Edited "The Snapper"; BAFTA TV Award for Best Film or Video Editor (Fiction/Entertainment)
1994	Interview with the Vampire	Neil Jordan	Co-edited with Joke van Wijk
1995	12 Monkeys	Terry Gilliam	
1996	The Van	Stephen Frears	
1997	The Serpent's Kiss	Philippe Rousselot	
1998	The Avengers	Jeremiah S. Chechik	
2000	High Fidelity	Stephen Frears	
2001	Captain Corelli's Mandolin	John Madden	
2002	Dirty Pretty Things	Stephen Frears	
2003	Mona Lisa Smile	Mike Newell	
2005	Proof	John Madden	
2005	Harry Potter and the Goblet of Fire	Mike Newell	
2007	Love in the Time of Cholera	Mike Newell	
2008	Killshot	John Madden	Co-edited with Lisa Gunning
2009	The Imaginarium of Doctor Parnassus	Terry Gilliam	
2010	Prince of Persia: The Sands of Time	Mike Newell	Co-edited with Michael Kahn and Martin Walsh
2010	Tamara Drewe	Stephen Frears	
2011	The Wholly Family	Terry Gilliam	Short film
2011	Angels Crest	Gaby Dellal	Co-edited with Giles Bury
2011	How to Steal 2 Million	Charlie Vundla	Senior editor
2012	Lay the Favorite	Stephen Frears	
2013	Muhammad Ali's Greatest Fight	Stephen Frears	Television film
2013	The Zero Theorem	Terry Gilliam	
2014	Mohammed	Mustapha Kseibati	Short film Consultant
2015	Everest	Baltasar Kormákur	
2016	Allied	Robert Zemeckis	Co-edited with Jeremiah O'Driscoll
2017	Murder on the Orient Express	Kenneth Branagh	
2019	The Personal History of David Copperfield	Armando Iannucci	
2022	Pinocchio	Robert Zemeckis	Co-edited with Jesse Goldsmith
