= José Rubens Chachá =

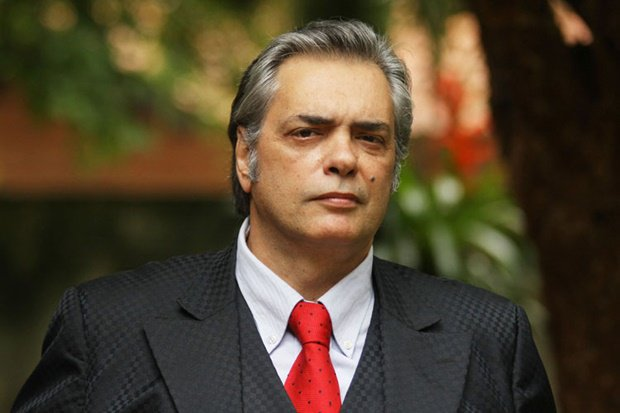
- Born: José Rubens Chasseraux; 4 August 1954 (age 71); Santos, São Paulo, Brazil
- Occupation: Actor
- Years active: 1976–present

José Rubens Chasseraux, known professionally as José Rubens Chachá (born 4 August 1954) is a Brazilian actor, author, and screenwriter.

== Career ==
He began his career as a musician and, through his musical career, transitioned to a career in theatre. He wrote, among others “É Fogo Paulista", "Rádio Bixiga", "Acordes Celestinos". On Rede Globo, he wrote for TV Colosso, and for films such as “O Beijo 2348/72”, “Ed Mort”, and “Castelo Rá-Tim-Bum". With more than 40 years as a theatre actor, he is known for his roles in plays such as “Ópera do Malandro" e "Os Saltimbancos”, as well as for his more than fifteen years at Teatro do Ornitorrinco, with performances around the world. Other notable roles include him portraying Silvio Santos in the bio-pic O Rei da TV, as well as Alfred in the Brazilian version of Batman Unburied.

== Filmography ==
=== Television ===
Year	Title	Role	Notes
1976	Xeque-Mate	Edson	
1978	Baby-Davil		
1985	Telecurso Segundo Grau	Presenter	
1987	A Besta Cibernética		
1989	O Cometa	Germano	
1996	Dona Anja	Eliphas	
2000	Sãos e Salvos!	Seu Rony	
2004	Malhação	Calixto	
2004	Um Só Coração	Oswald de Andrade	
2005	Mad Maria	Coronel Agostinho	
2005	Carga Pesada	Muralha	Episode: "Muita Areia pro Meu Caminhão"
2006	JK	Oswald de Andrade	
2006	Sítio do Picapau Amarelo	Valdo Serrão	
2007	Guerra e Paz	Delegado Finazzi	Year end special
2007	Malhação	Arnaldo Persi	
2008	Casos e Acasos	Vítor	
2008	Ciranda de Pedra	Seu Memé (Palamedes Carmelo)	
2008	Desejo Proibido	Presidium director	
2008	Três Irmãs	Delegado Novais	
2009	Caminho das Índias	Juiz	
2009	Cinquentinha	Maciel	
2009	Força-Tarefa	Captain Mascarenhas	
2009	Toma Lá, Dá Cá	Vânia	Episode: "Tatalo Mãos de Tesoura"
2010	Escrito nas Estrelas	Juvenil	
2011	Lara com Z	General director	
2011	O Astro	Youssef Hayalla	
2012	As Brasileiras	Coronel José Honório	
2012	Gabriela	Dr. Ezequiel	
2013	A Mulher do Prefeito		
2014	Em Família	Diogo	
2015	I Love Paraisópolis	Fradique	
2016-18	Carinha de Anjo	Delegado Peixoto	
2019	Ilha de Ferro	Neto	
2020	Good Morning, Verônica	Carlos Beto Alberto	
2022	Reis	Eli	Phase: A Decepção
2022	O Rei da TV	Silvio Santos	
2023	Travessia	Montez	

=== Film ===
Year	Title	Role
1986	The Interview	
1987	Night Angels	Leger
1987	Carlota/Amorosidade	
1989	Lua Cheia	
1990	Beijo 2348/72	Pedrão
1992	PR Kadeia	Carioca
1994	A Causa Secreta	
1994	Mil e Uma	David
1994	O Efeito Ilha	Otávio
1995	História do Futuro	
1996	Olhos de Vampa	Host of the night club
1997	A Grande Noitada	Massa
1997	Ed Mort	Silva (voice)
1997	Os Matadores	Delegado
1999	Uma história de futebol	Sr. Landão (short)
2000	Através da Janela	Dona da Farmácia
2002	Desmundo	João Couto
2002	Cena 1	Old man
2004	Como Fazer um Filme de Amor	Various personalities
2005	Quanto Vale Ou É Por Quilo?	Delegado Batista
2005	Ímpar Par	Customer
2009	Amor e Camisa	Supporter
2010	Bom Dia, Eternidade	Inspector Teixeira
2017	Jogos Clandestinos	Nicolai
2018	The Countries we Love	Jéssica's father
2020	Just Another Christmas	Tio Victor
2023	Uma Carta para Papai Noel	Santa Claus
2024	Chama a Bebel	Seu João

=== As author or screenwriter ===
- 2011 - Família Vende Tudo
- 2010 - O Enigma da Gaivota - short film
- 1999 - Castelo Rá-Tim-Bum
- 1997 - Ed Mort
- 1997 - Quarto Crescente
- 1992 - Prk...deia - short film
- 1991 - Mano a Mano - short film
- 1990 - Beijo 2348/72
