= Silvio Barbato =

Italian composer (1959-2009)

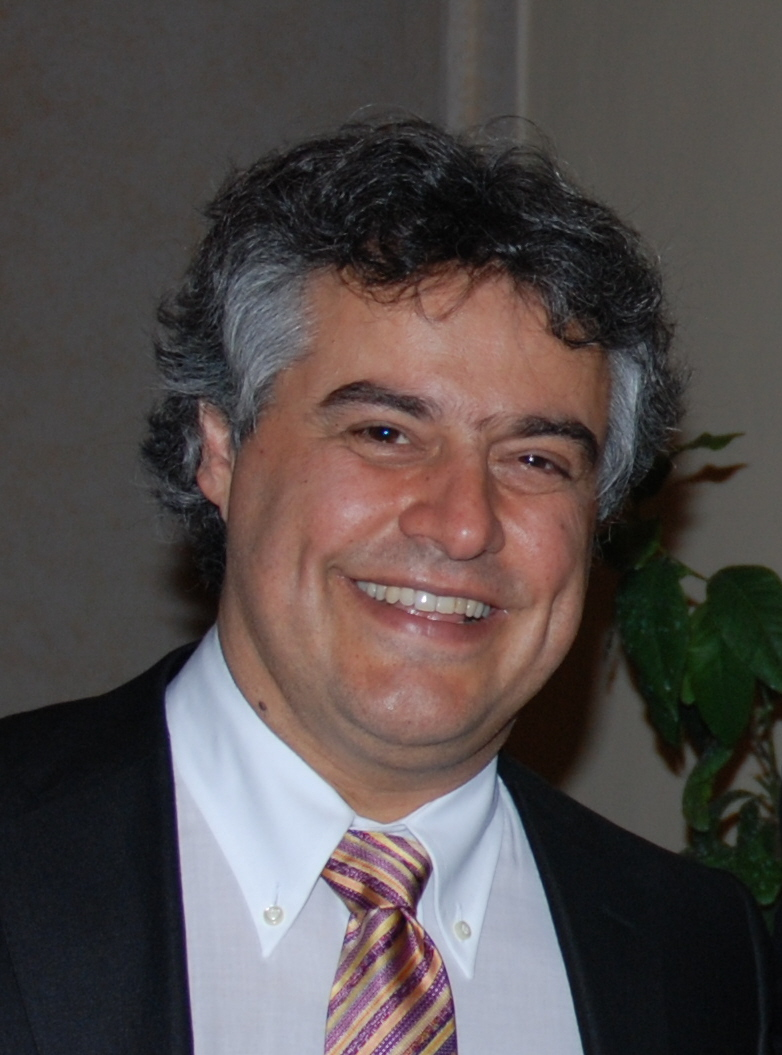
Silvio Barbato

Silvio Sergio Bonaccorsi Barbato (11 May 1959 – 1 June 2009) was an Italian-Brazilian opera conductor and composer. He died on board Air France Flight 447.

== Life and career ==
Maestro Barbato was born in Italy, the son of Daniele Barbato and Rosalba Bonaccorsi, daughter of Silvio and Alvara Bonaccorsi and granddaughter of Celestino and Luigi Bonaccorsi, descendants of the Bonaccorsi brothers, originally from Fornaci di Barga, (Italy), who emigrated to Brazil at the end of the 19th century. His grandparents were both doctors in Candeias (Minas Gerais), (Brazil). His father died in Brasília, of a heart attack, in the 1990s, when at the time he was a professor at the university of the capital.

He graduated in "conducting" at the University of Brasília; he studied conducting and composition first with Cláudio Santoro and then he moved to Milan where he continued with Azio Corghi at "Conservatorio Giuseppe Verdi". In 1984 he received his merit degree at the "Accademia Musicale Chigiana" of Siena, and one year later he graduated from the "Conservatorio Giuseppe Verdi", also receiving the gold medal in High Conducting, the first Brazilian to receive of this honour since Carlos Gomes. His conducting career started at age 25, when he directed a performance of Tosca at the Municipal Theatre of Rio de Janeiro becoming known as "maestro menudo" ("little conductor") as he was the youngest conductor in Brazil to direct a complete opera and as well because he had a very full head of hair. In Italy he also studied with Franco Ferrara, and he became the assistant director of M° Romano Gandolfi at the Teatro alla Scala. Master in "Italian Opera" at the University of Chicago in the class of Philip Gossett.

Barbato was twice director of the Orchestra of the Cláudio Santoro National Theater in Brasília: from 1989 to 1992 and from 1999 to 2006.

In 1996, for the centenary of Antônio Carlos Gomes, he was called by Plácido Domingo to reconstruct the original partition of the opera O Guarany, for the opening night of the Washington National Opera. This version had never been performed before, after its debut at Teatro alla Scala in 1870.

He was the musical director of the film Villa-Lobos – Uma Vida de Paixão, and was awarded the 2nd Grande Prêmio Cinema Brasil, in the category Best Score. In 2002 he received the "Medal for Cultural Merits" from the President of Brazil and he was also named "Commendatory of the Order of Rio Branco".

In 2006 he directed the first European performance of the opera "Colombo", symphonic coral poem in four acts by Albino Falanca, music by Antônio Carlos Gomes, at Teatro Massimo Bellini of Catania. The performance of "Colombo" at Bellini Theatre has been a great event, that also attracted the attention of the international press, because it had never been performed in Europe in 114 years, but only in the American Continent. In this occasion, a CD has been recorded by musical edition "Bongiovanni" of Bologna. In the same year he also received the commission of conducting the close of the Mozartian year, at the Teatro Olimpico of Vicenza.

In March 2009 at the International Mugham Festival he conducted symphonic mugams of Fikret Amirov in Philharmonic Hall of Baku, Azerbaijan.

On 1 June 2008, he conducted the "Camerata Brasil" of Brasília in the concert "Tribute to Pavarotti", with the participation of Luciana Tavares, Thiago Arancam, Andreas Kisser and Fernanda Abreu. In November he conducted the world premiere, in pocket version, of his second opera, "Carlos Chagas" in the Sala Palestrina of Palazzo Pamphilj in Rome, in the presence of many members of the "Pontificia Accademia delle Scienze" and of eight Nobel laureates.

During the last years Barbato dedicated himself to composition, debuting two operas: "O Cientista", based on the life of Oswaldo Cruz, and "Carlos Chagas", based on the life of Carlos Chagas Filho. In Italy he conducted in Rome, Catania, Spoleto, Sanremo, Lecce, Florence, Vicenza, Palermo. He collaborated with such great singers as Angela Gheorghiu, Roberto Alagna, Montserrat Caballé and Plácido Domingo. He was permanent Director of the Symphonic Orchestra of the Municipal Theatre of Rio de Janeiro, artistic director of the Cláudio Santoro National Theater in Brasília, and musical director of Sala Palestrina of Palazzo Pamphilj in Rome.

He loved his city, Rio de Janeiro, and, despite his international career which required him to travel a lot, he always wanted to live in Brazil.

He was a supporter of the football team "Flamengo".

He also conducted choral works such as Hector Berlioz's L'enfance du Christ (performed with the city's combined musical forces in 2004).
During his life he promoted the works of his teacher Claudio Santoro whose music he regarded as "indisputably composed in the mould of Soviet socialist realism" on a par with Shostakovich. He also championed the music of Heitor Villa-Lobos.

Barbato was en route to Kyiv where he was due to conduct and teach, aboard Air France Flight 447 from Rio de Janeiro to Paris early on 1 June 2009 when it crashed over the Atlantic Ocean off the coast of Fernando de Noronha, an archipelago of 21 islands and islets 354 km (220 mi) from the Brazilian coast.

== Works ==
- "O Guarani, Canto de Guerra, Canto de Vitória" – book – 2004
- "Terra Brasilis" – ballet – Mondial "prima" at Municipal Theatre of Rio de Janeiro in 2003.
- "O Cientista" – opera – Mondiale "prime" at Municipal Theatre of Rio de Janeiro in 2006.
- "Carlos Chagas" – opera – Mondial "prima" in poket version at Sala Palestrina of Palazzo Panphilj in Rome, 1 November 2008.
- "Simon Bolivar" – opera – His last work, remained uncompleted. Should debut in 2009.

== Use of Barbato's death in 419 scams ==
Barbato's name has been used in some instances of 419 scam, with the English Wikipedia article about him used to add weight to the scammer's letter; any claims made within such letters are false.
