= Lauro António =

Portuguese film director (1942–2022)

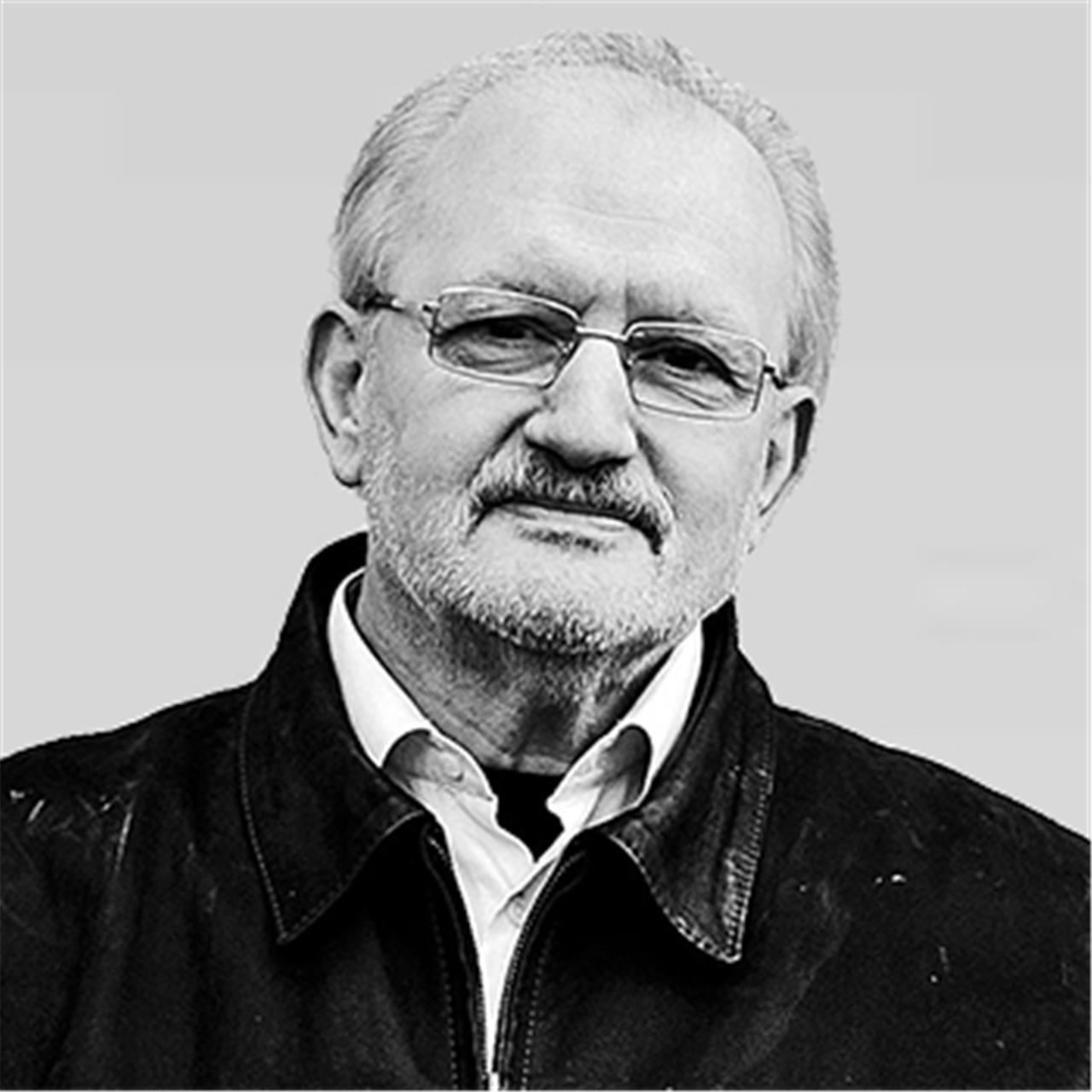
- Born: Lauro António de Carvalho Torres Corado; 18 August 1942; Lisbon, Portugal
- Died: 3 February 2022 (aged 79); Lisbon, Portugal
- Occupations: Director, writer
- Years active: 1975–2022

Lauro António de Carvalho Torres Corado (18 August 1942 – 3 February 2022) was a Portuguese film director.

His 1980 film Morning Undersea was entered into the 12th Moscow International Film Festival where it won a Special Diploma.

Lauro António died on 3 February 2022, at the age of 79.

== Filmography as director ==
- José Viana, 50 anos de carreira (1998)
- O Vestido Cor de Fogo (1986)
- A Bela e a Rosa (1984)
- Casino Oceano (1983) (TV)
- Mãe Genovena (1983)
- Paisagem Sem Barcos (1983)
- Manhã Submersa (1980)
- O Zé-Povinho na Revolução (1978)
- Bonecos de Estremoz (1978)
- Vamos ao Nimas (1975)
- Prefácio a Vergílio Ferreira (1975)
