= The Moth (1980 film) =

1980 film

- Film poster
- Directed by: Tomasz Zygadło
- Written by: Tomasz Zygadło
- Starring: Roman Wilhelmi
- Cinematography: Jacek Zygadlo
- Release date: 10 October 1980
- Running time: 100 minutes
- Country: Poland
- Language: Polish

The Moth (Polish: Ćma) is a 1980 Polish drama film written and directed by Tomasz Zygadło. It was entered into the 12th Moscow International Film Festival where Roman Wilhelmi won the award for Best Actor.

== Cast ==
- Roman Wilhelmi as Jan
- Anna Seniuk as Magda
- Iwona Bielska as Justyna
- Nela Obarska as Agata
- Jerzy Trela as Soltys
- Grzegorz Herominski as Tomek
- Marek Probosz as Marcin
- Piotr Fronczewski as Psychiatrist
- Jerzy Stuhr as Elegant Gentleman
- Inez Fichna as Jola
- Jolanta Nowak
- Jan Hencz
- Janusz Skalski as Krzysztof
