= For the First Time (1967 film) =

- Directed by: Octavio Cortazar
- Produced by: Manuel J. Mora
- Cinematography: José López
- Edited by: Caìta Villalon
- Music by: Raul Gomèz
- Distributed by: El Estudio Cubano del Arte
- Release date: May 1967
- Running time: 10 minutes
- Country: Cuba
- Language: Spanish

For the First Time (Spanish: Por Primera Vez) is a 1967 Cuban documentary short film directed by Octavio Cortazar. It chronicles the events of April 12, 1967 in the village of Los Munos, in the Baracoa municipality of Cuba, where a mobile cinema truck shows the villagers moving pictures for the first time.

== Overview ==
The entire film was shot on April 12, 1967 in the village itself, and shows the cinema truck traveling to the village, as well as interviews with both the projectionists and several villagers. The film shown was the Chaplin feature, Modern Times, on a portable 16 mm projector in the back of the truck. As it happened, the film screening was well received.

The 10-minute film was made available in recent years for an international audience with it being included as a special feature in a MK2 DVD release of Modern Times, distributed by Warner Brothers, as well as on the Criterion Collection release.

== See also ==
- List of Cuban films
