= 2nd Grande Prêmio Cinema Brasil =

- Date: February 10, 2001
- Site: Palácio Quitandinha; Petrópolis, Rio de Janeiro, Brazil
- Hosted by: Felipe Veloso
- Directed by: Bia Lessa

Highlights
- Best Film: Eu, Tu, Eles
- Most awards: Eu, Tu, Eles and O Auto da Compadecida (4)
- Most nominations: Eu, Tu, Eles (10)

Television coverage
- Network: TV Cultura and Televisão Educativa

The 2nd Grande Prêmio Cinema Brasil ceremony, presented by the Ministry of Culture of Brazil, honored the best audiovisual productions of 2000 and took place on February 10, 2001, at the Palácio Quitandinha in the city of Petrópolis, Rio de Janeiro beginning at 8:30 p.m. BRT. During the ceremony, the Ministry of Culture presented the Grande Prêmio Cinema Brasil in 18 categories. The ceremony, televised by TV Cultura and Televisão Educativa, was directed by Bia Lessa and hosted by stylist Felipe Veloso.

Eu, Tu, Eles and O Auto da Compadecida, each receiving four awards, becoming the most award winners of the ceremony. Other feature film winners included Villa-Lobos – Uma Vida de Paixão and Castelo Rá-Tim-Bum with one award each. Hans Staden was the second film which most received nominations but did not won any award.

== Ceremony ==
The ceremony was held on February 10, 2001, at the Palácio Quitandinha, a former luxury resort hotel in Petrópolis, State of Rio de Janeiro, Brazil, beginning at 8:30 p.m. BRT. Televised by TV Cultura and Televisão Educativa, the ceremony was directed by Bia Lessa and hosted by stylist Felipe Veloso. The ceremony started by honoring Sônia Braga, Renato Aragão and Nelson Pereira dos Santos who were hailed by Caetano Veloso, Mangueira members and by former collaborators respectively. It was followed by the awards which were handed by personalities—including singers Marina Lima and MV Bill, philosopher Gerd Bornheim, sprinter Robson Caetano, and journalist Pedro Bial—called onstage by Veloso to make a statement about cinema while the winner was announced on the screen.

== Winners and nominees ==
=== Awards ===
Winners are listed first and highlighted in boldface. (Note: The sources used here do not include the directors for Best Animated Feature, Best Short Film, Best Medium Film, Best TV Cultural Production, and Best Video. There are individual sources to confirm such information.)

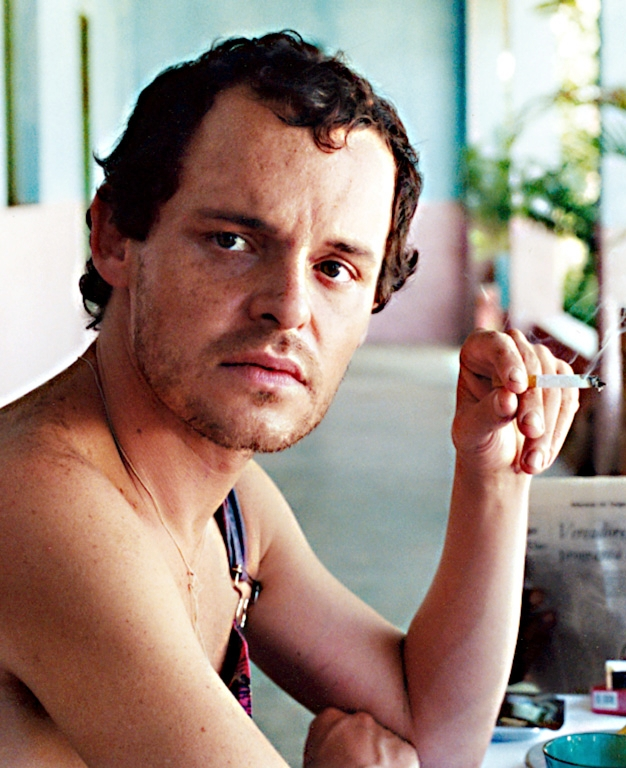
Matheus Nachtergaele, Best Actor winner

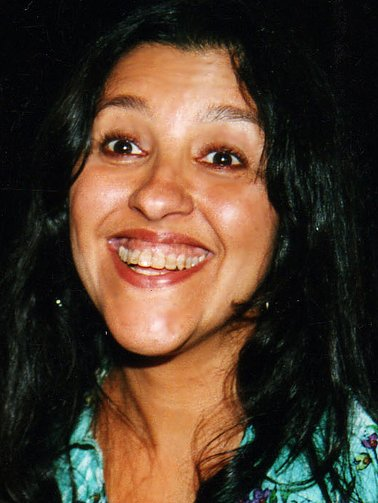
Regina Casé, Best Actress winner

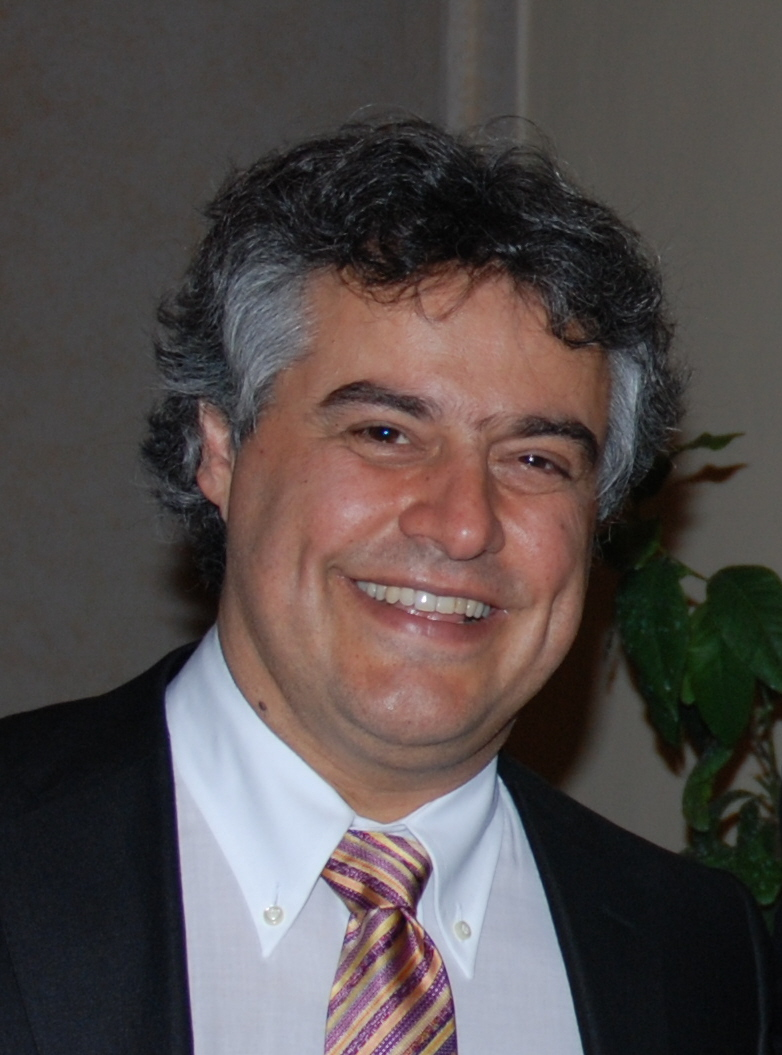
Silvio Barbato, composer of Villa-Lobos – Uma Vida de Paixão, Best Score winner

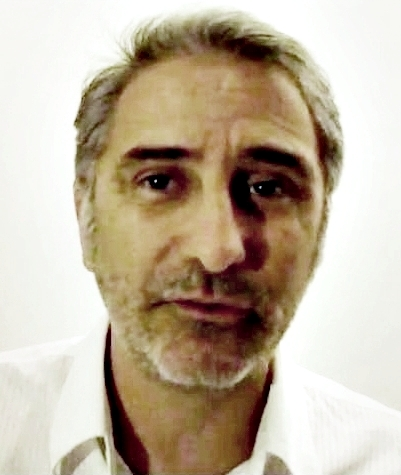
Marcelo Gomes, co-director of Os Brasileiros, Best Television Cultural Production winner tied with Música do Brasil.

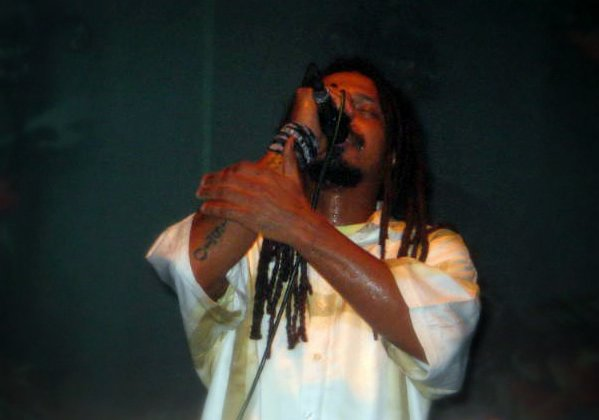
Marcelo Falcão, the lead vocalist of O Rappa whose song "Minha Alma (A Paz que Eu Não Quero)"'s music video was the Best Video winner tied with 5 Sentidos

Best Film	Best Foreign Language Film
**Eu, Tu, Eles** – **Andrucha Waddington**; O Auto da Compadecida – Guel Arraes; Castelo Rá-Tim-Bum – Cao Hamburger; Cronicamente Inviável – Sérgio Bianchi; Santo Forte – Eduardo Coutinho	**Buena Vista Social Club** – **Wim Wenders**; L'assedio – Bernardo Bertolucci; Lola rennt – Tom Tykwer; Magnolia – Paul Thomas Anderson; Train de Vie – Radu Mihăileanu
Best Director	Best Screenplay
**Guel Arraes** – O Auto da Compadecida; Andrucha Waddington – Eu, Tu, Eles; Bruno Barreto – Bossa Nova; Luiz Alberto Pereira – Hans Staden; Ruy Guerra – Estorvo	**O Auto da Compadecida** – **Guel Arraes, Adriana Falcão and João Falcão**; Amélia – Ana Carolina; Castelo Rá-Tim-Bum – Cao Hamburger; Eu, Tu, Eles – Elena Soárez; Hans Staden – Luiz Alberto Pereira
Best Actor	Best Actress
**Matheus Nachtergaele** – **O Auto da Compadecida**; Antônio Fagundes – Villa-Lobos – Uma Vida de Paixão; Genésio de Barros – Quase Nada; Renato Aragão – O Trapalhão e a Luz Azul; Stênio Garcia – Eu, Tu, Eles	**Regina Casé** – **Eu, Tu, Eles**; Denise Weinberg – Quase Nada; Fernanda Torres – Gêmeas; Laura Cardoso – Através da Janela; Miriam Muniz – Amélia
Best Cinematography	Best Editing
**Eu, Tu, Eles** – **Breno Silveira**; Cruz e Souza – O Poeta do Desterro – Antônio Luis Mendes; O Dia da Caça – Toca Seabra; Estorvo – Marcelo Durst; Hans Staden – Uli Burtin	**Eu, Tu, Eles** – **Vicente Kubrusly**; O Dia da Caça – Isabelle Rathery; Estorvo – Mair Tavares; Hans Staden – Verônica Kovensky; Villa-Lobos – Uma Vida de Paixão – Eduardo Escorel
Best Score	Best Release
**Villa-Lobos – Uma Vida de Paixão** – **Silvio Barbato**; Bossa Nova – Eumir Deodato; Estorvo – Egberto Gismonti; Eu, Tu, Eles – Gilberto Gil; Hans Staden – Marlui Miranda and Lelo Nazario	**O Auto da Compadecida** – **Guel Arraes**; Bossa Nova – Bruno Barreto; Castelo Rá-Tim-Bum – Cao Hamburger; O Dia da Caça – Alberto Graça; Eu, Tu, Eles – Andrucha Waddington
Best Art Direction	Best Animated Feature
**Castelo Rá-Tim-Bum** – **Vera Hamburger** and **Clóvis Bueno**; Amélia – Roberto Manieri; Eu, Tu, Eles – Toni Vanzolini; Hans Staden – Chico Andrade; O Trapalhão e a Luz Azul – Yurika Yamazaki	**Almas em Chamas** – **Arnaldo Galvão**; Amor Índio – Rui de Oliveira; Cavaleiro Jorge – Otto Guerra; Chifre de Camaleão – Marcelo Fabri Marão; A Dança do Acasalamento – Otacílio D'Assunção
Best Short Film	Best Medium Film (Note: According to Ministry of Culture a "medium" (footage) ("média metragem" in original) film is "one whose duration is longer than fifteen minutes and shorter than or equal to seventy minutes".)
**Outros** – **Gustavo Spolidoro**; O Mundo Segundo Silvio Luiz – André Francioli; Passadouro – Torquato Joel; Pormenores – Flávio Frederico; Tipos Intrometidos – Fábio Durand	**A Invenção da Infância** – **Liliana Sulzback**; BMW Vermelho – Eduardo Ramos and Reinaldo Pinheiro; Um Filme de Marcos Medeiros – Ricardo Elias; Tepê – José Eduardo Belmonte; O Velho, o Mar e o Lago – Camilo Cavalcanti
Best Television Series	Best Television Cultural Production (tie)
**A Muralha** – **Rede Globo**; Amor que Fica – Multishow; Aquarela do Brasil – Rede Globo; Como Ser Solteiro – Multishow; A Invenção do Brasil – Rede Globo	**Os Brasileiros** – **Marcelo Gomes/Philippe Barcinski/Televisión América Latina**; **Música do Brasil** – **Belisario Franca/MTV**; Os Carvoeiros – Nigel Noble/ Les Zazen Produções; O Povo Brasileiro – Isa Grinspum Ferraz/GNT/TV Cultura/Fundar; Timor Leste – O Nascimento de uma Nação – Paulo Markun/TV Cultura/STV
Best Video (tie)	Mário Peixoto Award
**5 Sentidos** – **André Amparo, Claudio Santos, Francisco de Paula, Marcelo Braga de Freitas, Marília Rocha and Rodrigo Minelli**; **Minha Alma (A Paz que Eu Não Quero)** – **Breno Silveira, Kátia Lund and Paulo Lins**; Acidente Geográfico – Eder Santos; Cartas da Mãe – Fernando Kinas and Marina Willer; O Fim do Sem Fim – Beto Magalhães, Cao Guimarães and Lucas Bambozzi	**Riofilme**; Anima Mundi; BR Distribuidora; Filme B; Labocine

=== Multiple nominations and awards ===
The following eleven films received multiple nominations.

- Ten: Eu, Tu, Eles
- Six: Hans Staden
- Five: O Auto da Compadecida
- Four: Castelo Rá-Tim-Bum, Estorvo
- Three: Amélia, Bossa Nova, O Dia da Caça, Villa-Lobos – Uma Vida de Paixão
- Two: Quase Nada, O Trapalhão e a Luz Azul

The following two films received multiple awards.

- Four: Eu, Tu, Eles and O Auto da Compadecida

== See also ==
- List of Brazilian films of 2000
- 2001 in film
