= Guardafronteras =

1981 film

- Film poster
- Directed by: Octavio Cortázar
- Produced by: Santiago Llapur
- Starring: Javier González
- Cinematography: Raúl Rodríguez
- Release date: July 1981
- Country: Cuba
- Language: Spanish

Guardafronteras is a 1981 Cuban drama film directed by Octavio Cortázar. It was entered into the 12th Moscow International Film Festival, where Tito Junco won the award for Best Actor.

== Cast ==
- Javier González
- Tito Junco
- Alberto Pujol
- Maribel Rodríguez
- Mara Roque
- Patricio Wood

== See also ==
- List of Cuban films
