= Castelo Rá-Tim-Bum (film) =

1999 film directed by Cao Hamburger

- Film poster
- Directed by: Cao Hamburger
- Written by: Cao Hamburger; José Rubens Chachá; José Carvalho de Azevedo; João Emanuel Carneiro; Fernando Bonassi; Victor Navas; Anna Muylaert
- Produced by: Van Fresnot; Alain Fresnot; Cao Hamburger
- Starring: Diego Kozievitch; Rosi Campos; Sérgio Mamberti; Marieta Severo
- Edited by: Michael Ruman
- Music by: André Abujamra; Lulu Camargo
- Production companies: A.F. Cinema e Vídeo; CAOS Produçoes; TV Cultura
- Distributed by: Columbia TriStar Film Distributors International
- Release date: December 31, 1999
- Running time: 108 minutes
- Country: Brazil
- Language: Portuguese
- Budget: R$6,7–7 million
- Box office: R$3,031,875

Castelo Rá-Tim-Bum is a 1999 Brazilian film directed by Cao Hamburger, based on the Castelo Rá-Tim-Bum TV series.

== Plot ==
In Castelo Rá-Tim-Bum 300-year-old Nino looks like he is eight or nine years old. Described by Graeber as a "Brazilian counterpart" to Harry Potter, Nino tries to write a book of spells. His aunt and uncle criticize his apprenticeship and Nino wants to play with ordinary children. Losangela, a relative, begins conspiring with real estate developers who hope to tear down Nino's family's mansion.

== Cast ==
- Diegho Kozievitch as Antônino "Nino" Stradivarius
- Rosi Campos as Morgana Stradivarius
- Sérgio Mamberti as Dr. Victor Stradivarius
- Marieta Severo as Losângela Stradivarius
- Pascoal da Conceição as Abobrinha
- Matheus Nachtergaele as Rato
- Ângela Dip as Pénelope
- Leandro Léo as João
- Mayara Constantino as Cacau
- Oscar Neto as Ronaldo

== Reception ==
Castelo Rá-Tim-Bum grossed R$3,031,875 and was watched by 725,329 people in the 134 Brazilian theaters in which it was released. It was nominated for the 2nd Grande Prêmio Cinema Brasil for Best Film, Best Screenplay, and Best Release, and Vera Hamburger and Clóvis Bueno won the Best Art Direction Award. At the 2000 Chicago International Children's Film Festival it won the "Children's Jury Prize – International Feature Film or Video - Live Action". Critical-wise, Laurel Graeber of The New York Times said that it "charmingly captures the life of a Latin-style Addams Family."
