= 1984 in Brazilian television =

This is a list of Brazilian television-related events from 1984.

== Events ==
- 25 January – The first Diretas Já rally broadcast on national television occurs at Sé Cathedral in São Paulo.

== Debuts ==
- November 26 - Corpo a Corpo

== Shows ==
=== 1970s ===
- Turma da Mônica (1976–present)
- Sítio do Picapau Amarelo (1977–1986)

=== 1980s ===
- Balão Mágico (TV series) (1983-1986)

== Births ==
- 11 January - Milena Toscano, actress and model
- 18 June - Fernanda Souza, actress and TV host
- 8 September - André Vasco, actor and TV host
- 14 September - Fernanda Vasconcellos, actress
- 11 October - Juliana Didone, actress and model

== See also ==
- 1984 in Brazil
- List of Brazilian films of 1984
