= Kenoma (film) =

- Directed by: Eliane Caffé
- Written by: Eliane Caffé; Luis Alberto de Abreu
- Produced by: Alain Fresnot
- Starring: José Dumont; Mariana Lima; Enrique Díaz; Jonas Bloch; Matheus Nachtergaele; Eliana Carneiro
- Cinematography: Hugo Kovensky
- Edited by: Idê Lacreta
- Production company: A. F. Cinema e Vídeo
- Distributed by: Riofilme
- Release date: 4 September 1998
- Running time: 110 minutes
- Country: Brazil
- Language: Portuguese

Kenoma is a 1998 Brazilian drama film directed by Eliane Caffé. It tells the story of an artisan in a small village who tries to build the dreamt-of perpetual motion machine, while having to meet a deadline set by a powerful local landowner. The film stars José Dumont, Mariana Lima, Matheus Nachtergaele, and Jonas Bloch.

== Plot ==
Jonas travels to the small village of Kenoma, inhabited by rural workers, prospectors, and small traders. He ends up staying there because he is captivated by a young woman named Tari. In this village, the way of life is primitive. Among its inhabitants, Lineu stands out; he works in an abandoned mill, trying to build a machine capable of producing without the need for fuel. Obsessed with inventing this new, self-sufficient machine, his life becomes a succession of attempts and failures. He struggles against the ambitions of Gerônimo, one of the largest landowners in the region and the owner of the mill. Gerônimo dreams of turning Kenoma into a prosperous and wealthy town. He doesn't believe in Lineu's invention and disapproves of the time and energy it consumes. Now, Jonas will ally himself with Lineu, fascinated by his determination to invent the machine.

== Cast ==
- José Dumont as Lineu
- Mariana Lima as Tira
- Enrique Díaz as Jonas
- Jonas Bloch as Gerônimo
- Matheus Nachtergaele as Pedro
- Clóvis Bueno
- Eliana Carneiro

== Production ==
Filming took place in the early months of 1997, in the municipality of Araçuaí, Minas Gerais, with all exterior scenes shot in the villages of Itira, Quatis, and Alfredo Graça, where the local residents became extras. The perpetual motion machine that appears in the film was built in an adapted corral, a joint effort by set designers from São Paulo and local carpenters from the municipality. The set designer Vera Hamburger, who had previously worked on ten feature films, told the Folha de S.Paulo newspaper that she did not expect to find such a high level of collaboration from the local artisans in the Jequitinhonha Valley: "It was a surprise. They have a profound knowledge of the craft. The wooden joints, for example, are part of the local repertoire."

== Release ==
The film was released in Brazilian cinemas on September 4, 1998, by Riofilme. Prior to that, it was screened on August 23 in Araçuaí.

== Reception ==
Critic José Geraldo Couto stated that Kenoma, Eliane Caffé's first feature film, is, from every point of view, an eccentric film in the landscape of Brazilian cinema, firstly for its premise about the quest for the utopia of perpetual motion, and secondly for its setting in a village lost in time in the Jequitinhonha Valley. This choice of an archaic theme gives the film a "tone of a biblical parable," whose tension is based on the confrontation between "the pole of utopia and the pole of pragmatism." For the critic, Kenoma is "a poetic manifesto" that takes the side of dreams and creative daring. Despite pointing out screenplay issues, such as the story being driven by an outsider character and the characterization of certain roles, Couto emphasizes that nothing undermines the film's impact, which has "two irresistible trump cards: the exceptional verisimilitude given to Lineu's machine and the poignant performance of José Dumont."

=== Accolades ===
Year	Awards	Category	Nominee(s)	Result	Ref.
1998	Biarritz Film Festival	Best Film	Kenoma	Won	
1998	Biarritz Film Festival	Best Actress	Mariana Lima	Won	
1998	Festival de Brasília	Best Actor	José Dumont	Won	
1998	Festival de Brasília	Best Art Direction and Set Design	Clóvis Bueno	Won	
1999	Buenos Aires International Festival of Independent Cinema	Best Film	Kenoma	Nominated	
1999	Brazilian Film Festival of Miami	Best Supporting Actor	José Dumont	Won	
1999	Brazilian Film Festival of Miami	Best Screenplay	Luis Alberto de Abreu and Eliane Caffé	Won	
1999	Brazilian Film Festival of Miami	Best Art Direction	Clóvis Bueno	Won	
1999	Prêmio Guarani de Cinema Brasileiro	Best Film	Kenoma	Nominated	
1999	Prêmio Guarani de Cinema Brasileiro	Best Direction	Eliane Caffé	Nominated	
1999	Prêmio Guarani de Cinema Brasileiro	Best Actor	José Dumont	Won	
1999	Prêmio Guarani de Cinema Brasileiro	Best Supporting Actor	Matheus Nachtergaele	Won	
1999	Prêmio Guarani de Cinema Brasileiro	Best Supporting Actor	Jonas Bloch	Nominated	
1999	Prêmio Guarani de Cinema Brasileiro	Best Soundtrack	Marco Antônio Guimarães, Paulo Sérgio Santos, and Décio Ramos	Nominated	
1999	SESC Film Festival	Best Actor	José Dumont	Won	
1999	Prêmio APCA	Most Promising Director	Eliane Caffé	Won	
1999	Prêmio APCA	Best Actor	José Dumont	Won	
1999	Gavà International Environmental Film Festival	Best Film	Kenoma	Won	
1999	Gavà International Environmental Film Festival	Best Director	Eliane Caffé	Won	
1999	Gavà International Environmental Film Festival	Honorable Mention for Photography	Hugo Kovensky	Won	
