= Tomasz Zygadło =

Polish film director

- Born: 23 December 1947; Warsaw, Poland
- Died: 17 September 2011 (aged 63); Warsaw, Poland
- Occupation: Film director
- Years active: 1967-1997

Tomasz Zygadło (23 December 1947 – 17 September 2011) was a Polish film director. He directed 26 films between 1967 and 1997. His 1980 film The Moth was entered into the 12th Moscow International Film Festival.

== Selected filmography ==
- The Moth (1980)
