= O Homem que Virou Suco =

1980 film

- Theatrical release poster
- Directed by: João Batista de Andrade
- Written by: João Batista de Andrade
- Produced by: Wagner de Carvalho
- Starring: José Dumont; Celia Maracajá
- Cinematography: Aloysio Raulino
- Edited by: Alain Fresnot
- Music by: Vital Farias
- Production companies: Raíz Filmes; Embrafilme
- Distributed by: Embrafilme
- Release date: 13 December 1980
- Running time: 97 minutes
- Country: Brazil
- Language: Portuguese

O Homem que Virou Suco (English: The Man That Was Turned Into Juice) is a 1980 Brazilian drama film written and directed by João Batista de Andrade.

== Cast ==
- José Dumont as Deraldo / Severino
- Célia Maracajá as Maria
- Denoy de Oliveira
- Freire Barros as Ceará
- Renato Master as Joseph Losey
- Rafael de Carvalho
- Ruthinéa de Moraes
- Aldo Bueno
- Dominguinhos as himself
- Ruth Escobar
- Vital Farias
- Luís Alberto Pereira
- Pedro Sertanejo

== Reception ==
It won the Golden Prize at the 12th Moscow International Film Festival.
