= Predrag Golubović =

Serbian film director (1935–1994)

- Born: 25 June 1935; Sarajevo, Yugoslavia
- Died: 18 July 1994 (aged 59); Belgrade, Serbia, Federal Republic of Yugoslavia
- Occupations: Film director, screenwriter
- Years active: 1964–1986

Predrag Golubović (25 June 1935 – 18 July 1994) was a Serbian film director and screenwriter. He directed more than 25 films between 1964 and 1986. His 1981 film Peacetime in Paris was entered into the 12th Moscow International Film Festival where it won a Special Prize. He had one son, film director Srdan Golubović.

== Selected filmography ==
- Peacetime in Paris (1981)
