= Peacetime in Paris =

1981 film

- Directed by: Predrag Golubović
- Written by: Ratko Djurovic; Vlatko Gilic
- Starring: Maria Schneider
- Cinematography: Milivoje Milivojevic
- Release date: July 1981
- Running time: 102 minutes
- Countries: Yugoslavia; France
- Languages: Serbian; French

Peacetime in Paris (Serbian: Sezona mira u Parizu, French: Une saison de paix à Paris) is a 1981 Yugoslav-French drama film directed by Predrag Golubović. It was entered into the 12th Moscow International Film Festival where it won a Special Prize.

== Cast ==
- Maria Schneider as Elen
- Dragan Nikolic as Dragan
- Alain Noury as Mikelandjelo
- Alida Valli
- Erland Josephson
- Predrag Manojlovic as Josko (as Miki Manojlovic)
- Daniel Gélin
- Pascale Petit
