= 12th Moscow International Film Festival =

Film festival

- Location: Moscow, Soviet Union
- Founded: 1959
- Awards: Grand Prix
- Festival date: 7–21 July 1981
- Website: http://www.moscowfilmfestival.ru

The 12th Moscow International Film Festival was held from 7 to 21 July 1981. The Golden Prizes were awarded to the Brazilian film O Homem que Virou Suco directed by João Batista de Andrade, the Vietnamese film The Abandoned Field: Free Fire Zone directed by Nguyễn Hồng Sến and the Soviet-French-Swiss film Teheran 43 directed by Aleksandr Alov and Vladimir Naumov.

== Jury ==
- Stanislav Rostotsky (USSR – President of the Jury)
- Juan Antonio Bardem (Spain)
- Basu Bhattacharya (India)
- Jerzy Hoffman (Poland)
- Jacques Duqeau-Rupp (France)
- Bata Živojinović (Yugoslavia)
- Komaki Kurihara (Japan)
- Jay Leyda (USA)
- Miguel Littín (Chile)
- László Lugossy (Hungary)
- Nelson Pereira dos Santos (Brazil)
- Gian Luigi Rondi (Italy)
- Olzhas Suleimenov (USSR)
- Med Hondo (Mauritania)
- Lyudmila Chursina (USSR)
- Marcela Fernandez Violante (Mexico)

== Films in competition ==
The following films were selected for the main competition:

English title	Original title	Director(s)	Production country
Ali in Wonderland	Ali au pays des mirages	Ahmed Rachedi	Algeria
Al Qadisiyya	Al Qadisiyya	Salah Abu Seif	Iraq
Jeppe på bjerget	Jeppe pa bjerget	Kaspar Rostrup	Denmark
The Pale Light of Sorrow	Lumina palidă a durerii	Iulian Mihu	Romania
Der Bockerer	Der Bockerer	Franz Antel	Austria, West Germany
Brothers and Sisters	Brothers and Sisters	Richard Woolley	Great Britain
Temporary Paradise	Ideiglenes paradicsom	András Kovács	Hungary
O Homem que Virou Suco	O Homem que Virou Suco	João Batista de Andrade	Brazil
Gary Cooper, Who Art in Heaven	Gary Cooper, que estás en los cielos	Pilar Miró	Spain
Tree Dzhamal	Derevo Dzhamal	Khodzhakuli Narliev	Soviet Union
Diva	Diva	Jean-Jacques Beineix	France
Savage Breed	Razza selvaggia	Pasquale Squitieri	Italy
For Freedom!	For Freedom!	Ola Balogun	Nigeria, Great Britain
Yo Ho Ho	Yo Ho Ho	Zako Heskiya	Bulgaria
Bloody Season	Fasl-e khoon	Habib Kavosh	Iran
Muddy River	Doro no kawa	Kōhei Oguri	Japan
Belønningen	Belønningen	Bjørn Lien	Norway
Our Daughter	Notre fille	Daniel Kamwa	Cameroon, France
Our Short Life	Unser kurzes Leben	Lothar Warneke	East Germany
Kalyug	Kalyug	Shyam Benegal	India
The Moth	Ćma	Tomasz Zygadło	Poland
Night by the Seashore	Yö meren rannalla	Erkko Kivikoski	Finland
The Abandoned Field: Free Fire Zone	Cánh đồng hoang	Nguyễn Hồng Sến	Vietnam
Guardafronteras	Guardafronteras	Octavio Cortázar	Cuba
Sentimental	Sentimental (requiem para un amigo)	Sergio Renán	Argentina
Peacetime in Paris	Sezona mira u Parizu	Predrag Golubović	Yugoslavia, France
The Pretenders	De Pretenders	Jos Stelling	Netherlands
Seduction	La seducción	Arturo Ripstein	Mexico
Escape to Victory	Escape to Victory	John Huston	United States
Bikaya suar	Bikaya suar	Nabil Maleh	Syria
Teheran 43	Tegeran 43	Aleksandr Alov, Vladimir Naumov	Soviet Union, France, Switzerland
Trokadero	Trokadero	Klaus Emmerich	West Germany, Austria
Bye, See You Monday	Au revoir... à lundi	Maurice Dugowson	Canada, France
Morning Undersea	Manhã Submersa	Lauro António	Portugal
Pictures	Pictures	Michael Black	New Zealand
Khatan-Bator	Khatan-Bator	G. Jigjidsuren	Mongolia
The Charter Trip	Sällskapsresan	Lasse Åberg	Sweden
The Man with the Carnation	O anthropos me to garyfallo	Nikos Tzimas	Greece
Ta chvíle, ten okamžik	Ta chvíle, ten okamžik	Jiří Sequens	Czechoslovakia
El caso Huayanay	El caso Huayanay	Federico García	Peru

== Awards ==
- Golden Prizes:
  - O Homem que Virou Suco by João Batista de Andrade
  - The Abandoned Field: Free Fire Zone by Nguyễn Hồng Sến
  - Teheran 43 by Aleksandr Alov, Vladimir Naumov
- Silver Prizes:
  - Temporary Paradise by András Kovács
  - Belønningen by Bjørn Lien
  - Muddy River by Kōhei Oguri
- Special Prizes:
  - Ali in Wonderland by Ahmed Rachedi
  - Yo Ho Ho by Zako Heskiya
  - Ta chvíle, ten okamžik by Jiří Sequens
  - Peacetime in Paris by Predrag Golubović
- Prizes:
  - Best Actor: Karl Merkatz for Der Bockerer
  - Best Actor: Tito Junco for Guardafronteras
  - Best Actor: Roman Wilhelmi for The Moth
  - Best Actress: Mercedes Sampietro for Gary Cooper, Who Art in Heaven
  - Best Actress: Maya-Gozel Aimedova for Tree Dzhamal
- Special Diplomas:
  - The Man with the Carnation by Nikos Tzimas
  - El caso Huayanay by Federico García
  - Morning Undersea by Lauro António
  - The Pale Light of Sorrow by Iulian Mihu
  - Night by the Seashore by Erkko Kivikoski
- Diploma:
  - Young Actor: Viktor Chouchkov for Yo Ho Ho
- Prix FIPRESCI: The Abandoned Field: Free Fire Zone by Nguyễn Hồng Sến
