= Octavio Cortázar =

Cuban film director (1935–2008)

- Born: Octavio Cortázar Jiménez; 19 January 1935; Havana, Cuba
- Died: 27 February 2008 (aged 73); Madrid, Spain
- Occupations: Film director Screenwriter
- Years active: 1961–2005

Octavio Cortázar Jiménez (19 January 1935 – 27 February 2008) was a Cuban film director and screenwriter. He directed twelve films between 1961 and 2005. His 1977 film The Teacher was entered into the 28th Berlin International Film Festival, where it won the Silver Bear for an outstanding artistic contribution. His 1981 film Guardafronteras was entered into the 12th Moscow International Film Festival.

Cortázar died of a heart attack while visiting Madrid on 27 February 2008 at the age of 73.

== Career ==
Cortázar began working in Cuban television before joining the Instituto Cubano del Arte e Industria Cinematográficos (ICAIC) in 1959, where he worked as a production assistant and participated in the making of Historias de la Revolución (1960), directed by Tomás Gutiérrez Alea. He later organized and directed the Enciclopedia Popular, a series of short educational films produced during the Cuban literacy campaign. From 1963 to 1967, Cortázar studied film directing at the Film and TV School of the Academy of Performing Arts in Prague (FAMU). After returning to Cuba, he worked primarily as a documentary filmmaker and directed several editions of the Noticiero ICAIC Latinoamericano. His documentary For the First Time (1967), about a mobile cinema bringing films to an isolated rural community in Cuba, became one of his best-known works and a classic of Cuban documentary cinema. Cortázar subsequently moved into fiction filmmaking, directing The Teacher (1977), Guardafronteras (1980) and ''Derecho de asilo'' (1994). ‘’The Teacher'', a drama set during the Cuban Literacy Campaign, won the Silver Bear for an outstanding artistic contribution at the Berlin International Film Festival in 1978.

== Selected filmography ==
- For the First Time (1967)
- The Teacher (1977)
- Guardafronteras (1981)
- La Ultima Rumba de Papa Montero (1992)
