= The Pale Light of Sorrow =

1981 film

- Directed by: Iulian Mihu
- Written by: George Macovescu
- Starring: Violeta Andrei
- Cinematography: Gábor Tarko
- Release date: July 1981
- Running time: 135 minutes
- Country: Romania
- Language: Romanian

The Pale Light of Sorrow (Romanian: Lumina palidă a durerii) is a 1981 Romanian drama film directed by Iulian Mihu. It was entered into the 12th Moscow International Film Festival where it won a Special Diploma.

The story is set in a village near Buzău, before and during World War I, and is based on a script by George Macovescu, then-president of the Writers' Union of Romania. The music of Antonio Vivaldi is heavily used in the soundtrack.

== Cast ==
- Violeta Andrei
- Andrei Finți
- Florina Luican
- Gheorghe Marin
- Rodica Mureșan
- Emanoil Petruț
- Alexandru Racoviceanu
- Geo Saizescu
- Siegfried Siegmund
- Savel Știopul
- Liliana Tudor
- Catinca Ralea
