= Ed Mort =

- Directed by: Alain Fresnot
- Written by: José Rubens Chachá; Alain Fresnot; Miguel Paiva (story); Luis Fernando Verissimo (story)
- Produced by: Dardo Toledo Barros; Alain Fresnot; Richard Pepin; Van Fresnot; Maria Ionescu
- Starring: Paulo Betti; Cláudia Abreu; Otávio Augusto; Ary Fontoura; Irene Ravache
- Cinematography: Pedro Farkas
- Edited by: Alain Fresnot; Idê Lacreta
- Music by: Arrigo Barnabé
- Distributed by: RioFilme
- Release date: May 1997
- Running time: 102 minutes
- Country: Brazil
- Language: Portuguese
- Budget: $1.5 million

Ed Mort is a 1997 Brazilian detective comedy film, directed by Alain Fresnot. The film is an adaptation of the comic strip character of the same name, by Luís Fernando Veríssimo.

== Premise ==
The film tells the adventures of private detective Ed Mort. He is hired by a mysterious woman to help find her husband, Silva, an expert in disguises.

== Cast ==
- Paulo Betti as Ed Mort
- Cláudia Abreu as Cibele
- Otávio Augusto as delegate Mariano
- Ary Fontoura as Nogueira
- Irene Ravache as Carmen
- Roseane Lima as Dayse
- Chico Buarque de Hollanda as Silva in disguise
- Marília Gabriela as Silva in disguise
- Cauby Peixoto as Silva in disguise
- Luíza Tomé as Silva in disguise
- José Rubens Chachá as Silva without disguises
- Gilberto Gil as Silva in disguise
- José Mojica Marins as Silva in disguise
- Heródoto Barbeiro as Himself
- Hélio Bicudo as Himself
- Rosi Campos as Wanda
- Mona Dorf as Herself
- Edson dos Santos as Bira
- Ary França as Adroaldo
- Iara Jamra as Pharaohs motel cashier
- Celso Ming as Himself
- Wandi Doratiotto as Agenor

== Background ==
Ed Mort was created in 1979 and published in Brazilian newspaper strips during the 1980s, with text by Luís Fernando Veríssimo and illustration by Miguel Paiva (who also created Radical Chic and Gatão de Meia Idade). The strips were serialized and each complete story was released in compilation books between 1985 and 1990, starting with the book Ed Mort in Looking for Silva (1985).

The script for the film adaptation was based on the story from Ed Mort in Looking for Silva. In the film, the private detective lives in São Paulo, instead of Rio de Janeiro like in the comics.

== Music ==
Arrigo Barnabé's background score for the film was released in 1997 by Brazilian record label Rob Digital.

== Release and reception ==
Ed Mort premiered in Rio de Janeiro, Belo Horizonte and Curitiba during May 1997. In São Paulo, it was released to theaters on June 5, 1997. HBO Brasil aired Ed Mort around the same time as its theatrical release, which caused some Brazilian theaters to boycott the film. The deal with HBO Brasil came about after the company gave $100,000 worth of funding to help the film get completed. In February 1998, Ed Mort was also shown at the Fantasporto Film Festival in Portugal.

Brazilian publication Agência Senado said in 1998 that the film "walks a fine line between humor and police drama."
