= Villa-Lobos: A Life of Passion =

2000 film

- Theatrical release poster
- Directed by: Zelito Viana
- Written by: Joaquim Assis
- Produced by: Zelito Viana
- Starring: Antônio Fagundes; Marcos Palmeira; Letícia Spiller
- Cinematography: Walter Carvalho
- Edited by: Eduardo Escorel
- Music by: Silvio Barbato
- Production company: Mapa Filmes
- Distributed by: Riofilme; United International Pictures
- Release date: 21 April 2000
- Running time: 130 minutes
- Country: Brazil
- Language: Portuguese
- Box office: R$874,453 ($376,886)

Villa-Lobos: A Life of Passion (Portuguese: Villa-Lobos - Uma Vida de Paixão) is a 2000 Brazilian drama film directed by Zelito Viana. It was entered into the 22nd Moscow International Film Festival. It won the 2nd Grande Prêmio Cinema Brasil for Best Score, and the 5th Brazilian Film Festival of Miami for Best Art Direction. Its production started in 1997 as Villa Lobos - História de Uma Paixão.

== Plot ==
The film is a docudrama of Brazilian composer Heitor Villa-Lobos, portraying him at various ages.

== Cast ==
- Antônio Fagundes as Heitor Villa-Lobos
  - Marcos Palmeira as young Heitor Villa-Lobos
- Letícia Spiller as Mindinha
- Ana Beatriz Nogueira as Lucília
- José Wilker as Donizetti
- Marieta Severo as Noemia
- Othon Bastos as Raul
- Emílio de Melo as Arthur Rubinstein
- Antonio Pitanga as Joaquim
