= Tito Junco (Cuban actor) =

Cuban actor

- Born: 4 January 1944; Havana, Cuba
- Died: 15 August 2003 (aged 59); Havana, Cuba
- Occupation: Actor
- Years active: 1975-2003

Tito Junco (4 January 1944 – 15 August 2003) was a Cuban film actor. He appeared in 19 films and television shows between 1975 and 2003. In 1981 he won the award for Best Actor at the 12th Moscow International Film Festival for his role in Guardafronteras.

== Selected filmography ==
- Guardafronteras (1981)
