= José Dumont =

Brazilian actor (born 1950)

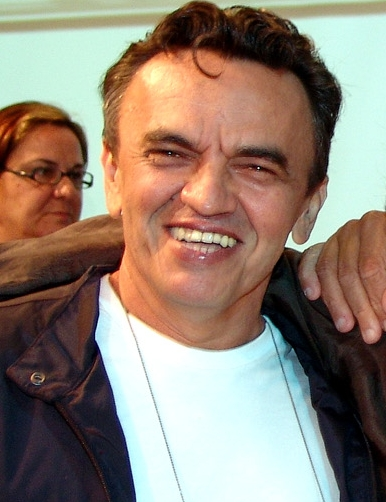
- Born: August 1, 1950 (age 76); Belém, Paraíba, Brazil
- Criminal charges: Storage of child pornography, statutory rape
- Criminal penalty: 1 year and 10 months + 9 years and 4 months
- Criminal status: Imprisoned

José Dumont (born 1 August 1950 in Belém, Paraíba) is a Brazilian TV and movie actor, known for his role as the family father in Behind the Sun (Abril Despedaçado), a film by director Walter Salles. He is also known by his role as the slick artist agent-entrepreneur in the 2005 Brazilian drama film Two Sons of Francisco.

Born in the state of Paraíba, in Brazilian Northeast, Dumont has the typical physique du rôle of its inhabitants, and because of this used to be often chosen to portray them. He began his award-studded acting career in the theater and cinema, in 1975. He became better known throughout the country by his noted participation in the films Lucio Flavio, directed by Hector Babenco in 1977, and Gaijin: Roads to Freedom, directed by Tizuka Yamasaki, in 1980. His first awards came in 1979, as the best actor in the film festivals of Gramado and Brasília, in O Homem que Virou Suco, directed by João Batista de Andrade, and in the film festival of Cuba. In 2004 he was again awarded as best actor in Narradores de Javé.

Dumont also acted in many TV series and telenovelas. He was in the permanent cast of Rede Globo. His most notable portrayals were in América (2005), Terra Nostra (1999), Tocaia Grande (1995), Guerra Sem Fim (1993), Amazônia (1991), A História de Ana Raio e Zé Trovão (1990), Pantanal (1990), Grande Sertão: Veredas (1985), Corpo a Corpo (1984), Padre Cícero (1984), Fernando da Gata (1983), Bandidos da Falange (1983) and Lampião e Maria Bonita (1982), this last being his first TV appearance, with a role as lieutenant Zé Rufino in the story about the bandit (cangaceiro) Lampião.

== Arrest ==
On September 15, 2022, Dumont was arrested on charges of suspicion of storing child pornography. He was accused of having a relationship with a 12‐year-old child, whom he would financially manipulate. A homage he was due to receive was canceled and he was fired from TV Globo. He was shooting the telenovela Todas as Flores and all of his scenes were reshot by actor Jackson Antunes. Dumont was released from jail one month later and had to wear electronic tagging.

On July 3, 2023, Dumont was sentenced to 1 year, 2 months, and 10 days of incarceration, plus a fine for storing child pornography. However, as the crime had no further impacts, and the actor was over 70-year-old, he had his sentence diminished to 1 year and 10 days on an open conditions term, which he could appeal in liberty.

In 2026, Dumont was sentenced to 9 years and 4 months in prison for statutory rape of a 11-year-old boy. Dumont was arrested on 3 March 2026 at his home in Rio de Janeiro.

== Main filmography ==
- Tungstênio (2017) – Seu Nery
- The Cambridge Squatter (2016) – Apolo
- Trash (2014) – Carlos
- A Hora e a Vez de Augusto Matraga (2012) – Padre Zequiel
- O Sonho de Inacim (2009) – Miguel
- Two Sons of Francisco (2005) – Miranda
- Lower City (2005) – Sergipano
- Olga (2004) – Manuel
- Narradores de Javé (2003) – Antonio Biá
- Behind the Sun (2001) – The father
- Kenoma (1998) – Lineu
- At Play in the Fields of the Lord (1991) – Commander Guzman
- Running Out of Luck (1987)
- Hour of the Star (1985) – Olímpico de Jesus
- Avaete, Seed of Revenge (1985)
- O Baiano Fantasma (1984) – Lambusca
- Os Trapalhões e o Mágico de Oróz (1984) – Tatu
- Memoirs of Prison (1984) – Mario Pinto
- O Homem que Virou Suco (1981) – Deraldo / Severino
- Gaijin: Roads to Freedom (1980) – Ceará
- Colonel Delmiro Gouveia (1978) – Zé Pó
- Lucio Flavio (1977)
- Morte e Vida Severina (1977)

=== TV ===
- 2021 Nos Tempos do Imperador — Coronel Eudoro Villar
- 2016 Velho Chico – Zé Pirangueiro
- 2015 I Love Paraisópolis – Seu Expedito Rufinno
- 2014 Milagres de Jesus – Job
- 2013 Dona Xepa – Esmeraldino Losano
- 2012 O Milagre dos Pássaros – Capitão Lindolfo Ezequiel
- 2012 Fora de Controle – Macieiro
- 2010 Ribeirão do Tempo – Romeu Fulgêncio
- 2008 Os Mutantes: Caminhos do Coração – Teófilo Magalhães (Téo)
- 2007 Caminhos do Coração – Teófilo Magalhães (Téo)
- 2007 Luz do Sol – Fausto (Rede Record) (special participation)
- 2006 Cidadão Brasileiro – Benvindo Ferraz (Rede Record)
- 2005 América – Bóia
- 1999 Terra Nostra – Batista
- 1997 Mandacaru – Teco (Rede Manchete)
- 1995 Tocaia Grande – Né Cachorrão (Rede Manchete)
- 1993 Guerra sem Fim – Penteado (Rede Manchete)
- 1991 Amazônia – Raimundo (Rede Manchete)
- 1990 A História de Ana Raio e Zé Trovão – Mané Coxo (Rede Manchete)
- 1990 Rosa dos Rumos – Antenor (Rede Manchete)
- 1990 Pantanal – Gil (Juma's father) (Rede Manchete)
- 1988 Olho por Olho – Eurípedes Peçanha (Rede Manchete)
- 1987 Carmem – Aluísio (Rede Manchete)
- 1985 Grande Sertão: Veredas – Zé Bebelo
- 1985 De Quina pra Lua – Cróvis/Peixoto
- 1984 Corpo a Corpo – Darci
- 1984 Padre Cícero – Franco Rabelo
- 1983 Fernando da Gata – Fernando da Gata
- 1983 Bandidos da Falange – Valdir
- 1982 Lampião e Maria Bonita – Tenente Zé Rufino
- 1981 Morte e Vida Severina – Severino

== Awards ==
Candango Trophy, from Brasilia Festival
1998: Best Actor, for Kenoma
1985: Best Actor, for Hour of the Star
1980: Best Actor, for O Homem que Virou Suco

Kikito de Ouro, of the Gramado Festival
1984: Best Actor, for O Baiano Fantasma
1981: Best Actor, for O Homem que Virou Suco
1980: Best actor, for Gaijin: Roads to Freedom

Havana Festival
1980: Best Actor, for O Baiano Fantasma

Brazilian Film Festival of Miami
1999: Best Actor, for Kenoma

APCA Trophy
1999: Best Actor, for Kenoma
