= The Teacher (1977 film) =

1977 film

- Directed by: Octavio Cortázar
- Written by: Octavio Cortázar
- Starring: René de la Cruz
- Cinematography: Pablo Martínez
- Edited by: Roberto Bravo
- Release date: 1977
- Running time: 113 minutes
- Country: Cuba
- Language: Spanish

The Teacher (Spanish: El brigadista) is a 1977 Cuban drama film directed by Octavio Cortázar. The film, set in the early years of the Cuban Revolution, tells the story of a young urban teacher going to poor, rural areas to teach peasants how to read and write. He must overcome the initial resistance of some inhabitants due to his youth, get used to a totally unknown environment and confront the bandits who support the mercenary invasion. The screenplay was written by Luis Rogelio Nogueras and Octavio Cortázar and starred René de la Cruz. The film was produced by the Instituto Cubano del Arte e Industrias Cinematográficos. It was entered into the 28th Berlin International Film Festival, where it won the Silver Bear for outstanding artistic contribution.

== Cast ==
- René de la Cruz
- Javier González
- Adela Legrá
- Luis Rielo
- Maribel Rodríguez
- Patricio Wood
- Salvador Wood

== See also ==
- List of Cuban films
