= Iulian Mihu =

Romanian film director

- Born: 30 November 1926; Bucharest, Romania
- Died: 20 June 1999 (aged 72); Bucharest, Romania
- Education: Caragiale National University of Theatre and Film
- Occupation: Film director
- Years active: 1953–1998

Iulian Mihu (3 November 1926 – 20 June 1999) was a Romanian film director. He directed nineteen films between 1953 and 1998. His 1981 film The Pale Light of Sorrow was entered into the 12th Moscow International Film Festival, where it won a Special Diploma.

Born in Bucharest, he graduated in 1955 from the I.L. Caragiale Institute of Theatre and Film Arts (IATC). He made his directing debut with two short films: La mere (1953), directed together with Manole Marcus, and Jocurile copilăriei (1955). His first feature film, Viața nu iartă (1957), was the adaptation of a novel by Alexandru Sahia. In addition to The Pale Light of Sorrow, his best known films are Felix and Otilia (1972), after the novel Enigma Otiliei by George Călinescu, Nu filmăm să ne amuzăm (1974), and Alexandra și infernul (1975), after a novel by Laurențiu Fulga. He died in 1999 in Bucharest, at age 72.

== Selected filmography ==
- La mere (1953)
- Jocurile copilăriei (1955)
- Viața nu iartă (1957)
- Poveste sentimentală (1961)
- Procesul alb (1965)
- Felix and Otilia (1972)
- Alexandra și infernul (1975)
- Nu filmăm să ne-amuzăm (1975)
- Marele singuratic (1976)
- Femeia la volan (1979)
- The Pale Light of Sorrow (1981)
- Omul și umbra (1981)
- Comoara (1983)
- Surorile (1984)
- Anotimpul iubirii (1986)
- Muzica e viața mea (1988)
- Băiatul cu o singură bretea (1991)
- Dublu extaz (1998)
