= La última rumba de Papá Montero =

La última rumba de Papá Montero is a 1992 Cuban film directed by Octavio Cortázar. The film focuses on a contemporary documentary production company that is attempting to create a non-fiction feature on Papá Montero, a 1930s rumbero who was murdered during Havana’s carnival celebrations. The film uses flashback sequences to recreate Papá Montero's celebrated dancing and his disastrous involvement in a fatal love triangle.

The film features rumba-inspired dance sequences performed on the streets of Havana by El Conjunto Folklorico Nacional de Cuba.

La última rumba de Papá Montero had a U.S. theatrical and home video release in 2001.
