= Desmundo =

2002 film directed by Alain Fresnot

- Theatrical release poster
- Directed by: Alain Fresnot
- Written by: Alain Fresnot; Sabina Anzuategui; Anna Muylaert
- Based on: Desmundo by Ana Miranda
- Produced by: Alain Fresnot; Van Fresnot
- Starring: Simone Spoladore; Osmar Prado; Caco Ciocler
- Cinematography: Pedro Farkas
- Edited by: Junior Carone; Alain Fresnot; Mayalu Oliveira
- Music by: John Neschling
- Production company: A.F. Cinema e Vídeo
- Distributed by: Columbia Pictures
- Release dates: October 5, 2002 (Festival do Rio); May 30, 2003 (Brazil)
- Running time: 101 minutes
- Country: Brazil
- Language: Galician Portuguese
- Budget: R$4.5 million
- Box office: R$692,921

Desmundo is a 2002 Brazilian drama film by Alain Fresnot, based on the novel of the same name by Ana Miranda. The film is set in 1570, a period when orphan Portuguese girls were sent to marry the settlers' sons. This was done to prevent the Portuguese from having sons with the indigenous peoples and black people in order to keep the Christian marriage and a "pure" heritage. The film follows Oribela (Simone Spoladore) as she is sent from Portugal to Brazil to marry Francisco de Albuquerque (Osmar Prado).

== Cast ==
- Simone Spoladore as Oribela
- Osmar Prado as Francisco de Albuquerque
- Caco Ciocler as Ximeno Dias
- Berta Zemel as Mrs Branca
- Beatriz Segall as Mrs Brites
- José Eduardo as governator
- Débora Olivieri as Maria
- José Rubens Chachá as João Couto
- Cacá Rosset as Afonso Soares D'Aragão
- Giovanna Borghi as Bernardinha
- Laís Marques as Giralda
- Arrigo Barnabé as musician

== Production ==
In order to be more faithful to the period Desmundo is set, Fresnot—beyond of using clothing, furniture and costumes—decided that the characters would speak in archaic Portuguese. He said it was a "very hard decision", but felt it would seem shallow to use colloquial language in a historical film. Thus, the film has subtitles in contemporary Portuguese. Its filming took place in Ubatuba, São Paulo.

== Reception ==
At the 35th Festival de Brasília, Desmundo won Best Score and Best Supporting Actress (Berta Zemel). It won Best Art Direction (Adrian Cooper and Chico Andrade), Best Costume Design (Marjorie Guelle) and Best Make Up (Vavá Torres) at the Grande Prêmio do Cinema Brasileiro.
