= Brothers and Sisters (1980 film) =

1980 film

- Directed by: Richard Woolley
- Written by: Tammy Walker; Richard Woolley
- Produced by: Keith Griffiths
- Starring: Carolyn Pickles; Sam Dale; Robert East
- Cinematography: Pascoe MacFarlaine
- Edited by: Mick Audsley
- Music by: Trevor Jones
- Distributed by: British Film Institute
- Release date: 1980
- Running time: 96 minutes
- Country: United Kingdom
- Language: English

Brothers and Sisters is a 1980 British crime drama film directed by Richard Woolley and starring Carolyn Pickles, Sam Dale and Robert East. Inspired by the Yorkshire Ripper murders, the film tells the story of a prostitute's murder and two members of a communal household who become suspects.

== Plot ==
When Jennifer Collins, a part time prostitute, is found murdered, two upper-class brothers become suspects. Neither have alibis and although political rhetoric divides David Barratt, a self indulgent 'revolutionary' living in a communal house, from his brother, James, a right wing army major, both men are linked by their shared sexual hypocrisy. James, it seems, prefers secret liaisons with prostitutes to sleeping with his wife while David, who has been sneakily conducting an affair with Theresa, Jennifer's sister employed by James as a nanny, bleats that he has just been "trying to work out new codes of sexual behavior", when challenged by Tricia, his live-in lover.

== Cast ==
- Carolyn Pickles as Theresa Bennett / Jennifer Collins
- Sam Dale as David Barratt
- Robert East as James Barratt
- Elizabeth Bennett as Sarah Barratt
- Jenifer Armitage as Tricia Snow
- Barry McCarthy as Pete Gibson
- Barrie Shore as Helen Dawson
- Norman Claridge as The Father
- Mavis Pugh as The Mother
- Fred Gaunt as The Detective
- Nick Jensen as Constable
- Jack Platts as Client

== Production ==
=== Development ===
Woolley was inspired by the Yorkshire Ripper investigation to make the film.

=== Filming ===
The film was shot on location in West Yorkshire, England.

== Release ==
The film was entered into the 12th Moscow International Film Festival.

=== Critical reception ===
The film had a positive reception.

- "A continuously interesting picture, formally adroit and persuasively acted" - The Observer
- "By a clever juggling of murder-thriller suspense and soap-opera naturalism. Woolley shrewdly anatomises Anglo-Saxon attitudes to sex and the sexes" - Financial Times
- "Brothers and Sisters has some marvellously evocative location photography.. it holds the attention and gives food for thought" - The Guardian
- "The film achieves an unexpected immediacy, with Carolyn Pickles giving an impressive performance" - Time Out

=== Home media ===
The film was included in the BFI DVD boxset An Unflinching Eye, that features several of Woolley's films.
