= Morning Undersea =

Misty Morning
- Directed by: Lauro António
- Written by: Lauro António
- Produced by: Lauro António
- Starring: Miguel Franco; Canto e Castro; António Santos
- Cinematography: Elso Roque
- Edited by: Lauro António
- Music by: Carlos Alberto Lopes
- Distributed by: CJ Entertainment; Focus Features
- Release date: 17 October 1980
- Running time: 131 minutes
- Country: Portugal
- Language: Portuguese

Morning Undersea (Portuguese: Manhã Submersa) is a 1980 Portuguese drama film directed by Lauro António. It was entered into the 12th Moscow International Film Festival where it won a Special Diploma. The film was also selected as the Portuguese entry for the Best Foreign Language Film at the 53rd Academy Awards, but was not accepted as a nominee.

== Cast ==
- Eunice Muñoz as Dona Estefânia
- Vergílio Ferreira as Reitor
- Canto e Castro as Padre Tomás
- Jacinto Ramos as Padre Martins
- Carlos Wallenstein as Padre Lino
- Joaquim Manuel Dias as António
- Miguel Franco as Capitão

== See also ==
- List of submissions to the 53rd Academy Awards for Best Foreign Language Film
- List of Portuguese submissions for the Academy Award for Best Foreign Language Film
