= 1984 in Brazil =

Events in the year 1984 in Brazil.

== Incumbents ==
=== Federal government ===
- President: General João Figueiredo
- Vice President: Aureliano Chaves

=== Governors ===
- Acre: Nabor Júnior
- Alagoas: Divaldo Suruagy
- Amazonas: Gilberto Mestrinho
- Bahia: João Durval Carneiro
- Ceará: Gonzaga Mota
- Espírito Santo: Gerson Camata
- Goiás: Iris Rezende
- Maranhão: Luís Rocha
- Mato Grosso: Júlio Campos
- Mato Grosso do Sul: Wilson Barbosa Martins
- Minas Gerais:
  - Tancredo Neves (until 14 August)
  - Hélio Garcia (from 14 August)
- Pará: Jader Barbalho
- Paraíba: Wilson Braga
- Paraná: José Richa
- Pernambuco: Roberto Magalhães
- Piauí: Hugo Napoleão
- Rio de Janeiro: Leonel Brizola
- Rio Grande do Norte: José Agripino Maia
- Rio Grande do Sul: Jair de Oliveira Soares
- Rondônia: Jorge Teixeira de Oliveira
- Santa Catarina: Esperidião Amin
- São Paulo: André Franco Montoro
- Sergipe: João Alves Filho

=== Vice governors ===
- Acre: Iolanda Ferreira Lima Fleming
- Alagoas: José de Medeiros Tavares
- Amazonas: Manoel Henriques Ribeiro
- Bahia: Edvaldo de Oliveira Flores
- Ceará: José Adauto Bezerra
- Espírito Santo: José Moraes
- Goiás: Onofre Quinan
- Maranhão: João Rodolfo Ribeiro Gonçalves
- Mato Grosso: Wilmar Peres de Faria
- Mato Grosso do Sul: Ramez Tebet
- Minas Gerais:
  - Hélio Garcia (until 14 August)
  - Vacant thereafter (from 14 August)
- Pará: Laércio Dias Franco
- Paraíba: José Carlos da Silva Júnior
- Paraná: João Elísio Ferraz de Campos
- Pernambuco: Gustavo Krause Gonçalves Sobrinho
- Piauí: José Raimundo Bona Medeiros
- Rio de Janeiro: Darcy Ribeiro
- Rio Grande do Norte: Radir Pereira
- Rio Grande do Sul: Cláudio Ênio Strassburger
- Santa Catarina: Victor Fontana
- São Paulo: Orestes Quércia
- Sergipe: Antônio Carlos Valadares

== Events ==
=== February ===
- February 24: The explosion of a Petrobras pipeline kills 508 people in the Vila Socó favela in Cubatão, São Paulo.

=== March ===
- March 2: The Sambódromo opens in Rio de Janeiro with a parade by Group 3 of the samba schools.

=== April ===
- April 16: More than one million people, led by Tancredo Neves, occupy the streets of São Paulo to demand direct presidential elections during the Brazilian military government of João Figueiredo. It is the largest protest during the Diretas Já civil unrest, as well as the largest public demonstration in the history of Brazil.
- April 25: The Dante de Oliveira Amendment, which would provide direct elections for President of the Republic, is rejected by the Brazilian Chamber of Deputies after receiving 298 votes in favor and 65 against.

=== May ===
- May 5: The Itaipu Dam is inaugurated on the border of Brazil and Paraguay after 9 years of construction, making it the largest hydroelectric dam in the world at the time.

=== August ===
- August 12: The National Convention of the PMDB chooses Governor Tancredo Neves and Senator José Sarney as its candidates for President and Vice President of the Republic.

== Births ==
=== January ===
- January 2: Otacílio Jales, footballer
- January 11: Milena Toscano, actress
- January 25: Robinho, footballer

=== February ===
- February 16: Fábio Lucindo, actor, voice actor and presenter

=== April ===
- April 10: Alemão, footballer (died 2007)

=== July ===
- July 5: Henrique Barbosa, swimmer

=== September ===
- September 7: – Miranda, footballer
- September 22: – Thiago Silva, footballer

=== October ===
- October 19: – Kaio de Almeida, swimmer

=== December ===
- December 18: - Mariana Brochado, freestyle swimmer

== Deaths ==
- January 3: Ivete Vargas, politician (b. 1927)

== See also ==
- 1984 in Brazilian football
- 1984 in Brazilian television
- List of Brazilian films of 1984
