= Narradores de Javé =

- Directed by: Eliane Caffé
- Starring: José Dumont; Nelson Xavier
- Cinematography: Hugo Kovensky
- Edited by: Daniel Rezende
- Music by: DJ Dolores
- Release date: 2003
- Running time: 100 minutes
- Countries: Brazil; France
- Language: Portuguese

Narradores de Javé (The Storytellers) is a 2003 Brazilian film by Eliane Caffé.

== Plot ==
A small and poor community called Javé is under threat of being flooded by a planned dam, and believe that the only way to prevent this is to prove the town's historical value. As the inhabitants are illiterate, they ask Antônio Biá for help, a man who has been ostracized ever since it was discovered that he had sent out libellous letters as a way to keep his job in the town's little-used post office. He now has the task of documenting people's memories of how the town began, and finds each inhabitant has their own version.

== Cast ==
- José Dumont as Antonio Biá
- Matheus Nachtergaele as Souza
- Nélson Dantas as Vicentino
- Rui Resende as Vado
- Gero Camilo as Firmino
- Luci Pereira as Deodora / Mariardina
- Nelson Xavier as Zaqueu
- Altair Lima as Galdério
- Henrique Lisboa as Cirilo
- Maurício Tizumba as Samuel

== Inspiration ==
The figure of the protagonist Antônio Biá, portrayed by José Dumont, was freely inspired by a real person: the prospector, volunteer postman, and memoirist Pedro Cordeiro Braga (1917–2000), a resident of the Vau settlement, a rural district of the municipality of Diamantina, in the Jequitinhonha Valley (Minas Gerais).
