= O Baiano Fantasma =

1984 film directed by Denoy de Oliveira

- Directed by: Denoy de Oliveira
- Written by: Denoy de Oliveira
- Starring: José Dumont
- Cinematography: Aloysio Raulino
- Edited by: Milton Bolinha; Renato Neiva Moreira
- Release date: 1984
- Running time: 95 min
- Country: Brazil
- Language: Portuguese

O Baiano Fantasma (English: The Ghostly Bahian) is a 1984 Brazilian film directed by Denoy de Oliveira and stars José Dumont as Lambusca.

== Cast ==
- José Dumont ... Lambusca
- Regina Dourado ... Zuzu
- Luiz Carlos Gomes ... Antenor
- Paulo Hesse ... Remela
- Rafael de Carvalho ... Chico Peixeira
- Sérgio Mamberti ... Fortunato

== Accolades ==
Gramado Film Festival

- Best Film
- Best Director (Denoy de Oliveira)
- Best Actor (José Dumont)
