= Eliane Caffé =

Brazilian film director

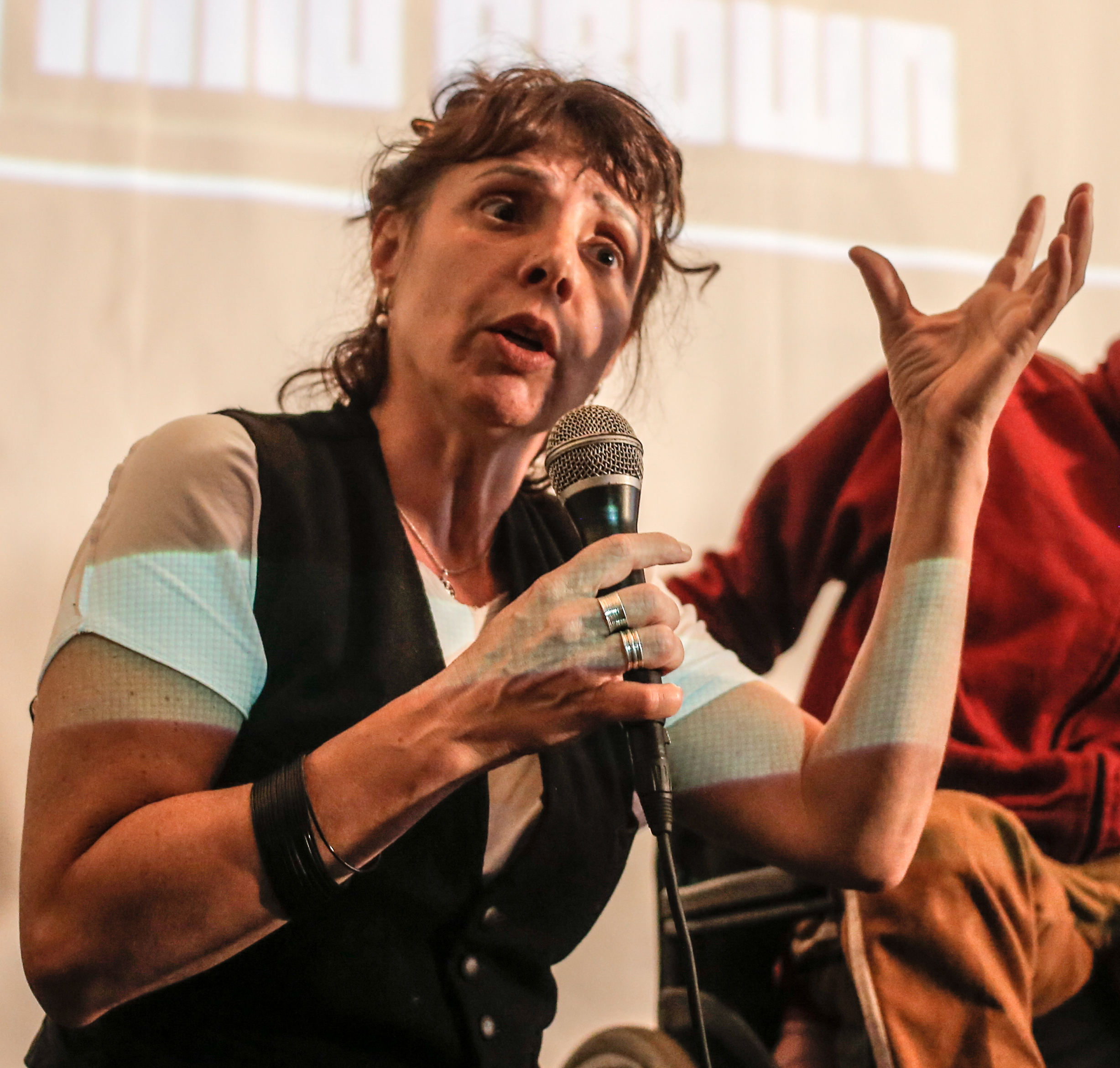
Eliane Caffé

Eliane Caffé (born 1961) is a Brazilian filmmaker. Born in São Paulo, Caffé got a Psychology degree from the Pontifical Catholic University of São Paulo in 1985 and a master's degree from Universidad Autónoma de Madrid in 1992. Caffé directed some short films in the beginning of her career. Her first feature film, Kenoma, from 1997, was exhibited at the 55th Venice Film Festival, and won the Soleil d'or in the 20th Biarritz Film Festival, among other awards. Her second feature was Narradores de Javé, from 2003 .

In 2016, she released Era o Hotel Cambridge, a docufiction about a squatted hotel in downtown São Paulo.

== Filmography ==
- 1987 - O nariz (short film)
- 1990 - Arabesco (short film)
- 1995 - Caligrama (short film)
- 1998 - Kenoma (Feature film)
- 2003 - Narradores de Javé (Feature film)
- 2008 - O Mago dos Viadutos (short film)
- 2009 - O Sol do Meio Dia (Feature film)
- 2009 - O Louco dos Viadutos (miniseries for TV Cultura)
- 2011 - Céu Sem Eternidade (Feature film)
- 2016 - Era O Hotel Cambridge (Feature film)
- 2020 - Para Onde Voam as Feiticeiras (documentary film)
