= Denoy de Oliveira =

Brazilian screenwriter and film director (1933–1998)

- Born: Denoy Gonçalves de Oliveira; 30 October 1933; Belém, Pará, Brazil
- Died: 4 November 1998 (aged 65); São Paulo, Brazil
- Occupation: Filmmaker

Denoy Gonçalves de Oliveira (30 October 1933 – 4 November 1998) was a Brazilian director, screenwriter, actor and composer.

== Life and career ==
Born in Belém, de Oliveira studied architecture at the Federal University of Rio de Janeiro and performing arts at the Teatro Martins Pena drama school. He made his professional debut as an actor in 1962, and in 1964 he founded the stage company Opinião, also serving as playwright and composer. With his 1973 feature film debut Amante muito Louca he won the award for best director at the Festival de Gramado, which won a second time in 1984 with his best known work, O Baiano Fantasma. His cinema is characterized by a strong socio-political awareness and an interest on characters on the margins of society. He also served as president of Associação Paulista de Cineasta ("São Paulo Filmmakers' Association", APACI).

He died of cardiac arrest following an abdominal surgery on 4 November 1998, at the age of 65. He was the brother of director and screenwriter Xavier de Oliveira.
