= João Batista de Andrade =

Brazilian film director

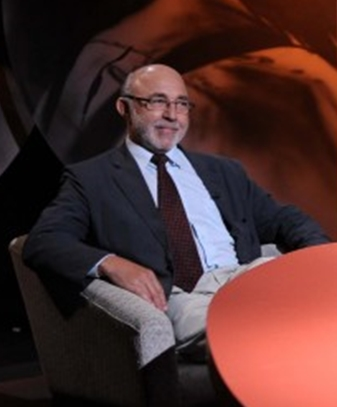

Minister of Culture Acting
- In office 22 May 2017 – 16 June 2017
- President: Michel Temer
- Preceded by: Roberto Freire
- Succeeded by: Sérgio Sá Leitão

Personal details
- Born: 1 December 1939 (age 85); Ituiutaba, Minas Gerais, Brazil
- Political party: Cidadania
- Profession: Director, filmmaker
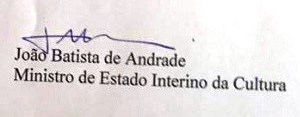
- Signature

João Batista de Andrade (born 14 December 1939) is a Brazilian film director and screenwriter. He directed more than 20 films between 1967 and 2006. His 1981 film O Homem que Virou Suco won the Golden Prize at the 12th Moscow International Film Festival.

On 22 May 2017, Batista assumed as acting minister of Culture after the resignation of Roberto Freire. Resigned a few weeks later after president Michel Temer involvement in the meat company JBS complaints.

== Selected filmography ==
- O Homem que Virou Suco (1981)

Political offices
| Preceded by Roberto Freire | Minister of Culture; Acting; 2017 | Succeeded by Sérgio Sá Leitão |
