= Alain Fresnot =

Brazilian film director, editor and producer

- Born: June 6, 1951 (age 74); Paris, France
- Occupations: Director, editor, producer
- Years active: 1976–present

Alain Fresnot (born June 6, 1951) is a French-born Brazilian film director, editor and producer. Born in Paris, his family came to Brazil in 1957 to live in Campinas due to the Algerian War. His family moved to São Paulo, where he attended on cinema courses before his first contact with professional cinema. In 1967, he made the continuity editing for Walter Hugo Khouri's As Amorosas. He directed three short films between 1973 and 1975, making his debut as a director in 1976 with Trem Fantasma.

== Filmography ==
- Trem Fantasma (1976; director)
- Noite em Chamas (1977; editor)
- Sede de Amar (1979; editor)
- O Homem que Virou Suco (1980; editor)
- Janete (1983; editor)
- A Marvada Carne (1985; editor)
- Jubiabá (1986; editor)
- Lua Cheia (1989; director)
- Ed Mort (1997; director)
- Kenoma (1998; producer)
- Castelo Rá-Tim-Bum (1999; producer)
- Desmundo (2002; director)
- Família Vende Tudo (2011; director)
- Moto Anjos (2015; producer)
