= Clayton Hill (actor) =

American actor

- Born: May 7, 1931
- Died: July 26, 2009 (aged 78); Burgettstown, Pennsylvania, U.S.
- Occupation: Actor

Clayton Hill (May 7, 1931 – July 26, 2009) was an American actor who appeared in many films, but was best known for his role as the "sweater zombie" in the 1978 horror film Dawn of the Dead by director George A. Romero.

He was an assistant director on Romero's 1981 Knightriders and had casting responsibilities for several films. Shortly before his death he played a major role as "Father Clayton" in wrestling star Kurt Angle's film End Game, and was to play a lead with Angle in the 2010 film River of Darkness.

== Early life and career ==
Hill had been a child performer, pushed to earn money by singing on the stage in beer gardens at age 6, and performed on local radio show as a teenager. He participated in talent shows, including a loss to future-actor/comedian Frank Gorshin. He enlisted in the United States Air Force after completing high school and served for four years, where his duties included serving as a security officer for the king and queen of Thailand.

After completing his military service, he worked at the Pittsburgh International Airport as head of the facility's fire department. He later worked as a civilian contractor for the Air Force as a disaster preparedness officer, where he developed plans to deal with chemical, biological, and nuclear warfare.

As a means to deal with on-the-job stress, his wife Sharon Ceccatti, an actress, convinced him to participate in acting classes at the Pittsburgh Playhouse, which he started in the early 1970s. While they were performing in operettas, he and his wife were approached about a director who was casting a horror film. Despite their unfamiliarity with zombies, they were hired to play the "lead zombies" in a film being directed by George Romero. A crew member described Hill's acting as making him "one of the most convincing zombies of the bunch", citing his skill at maintaining his stiff pose and rolling his eyes back into his head, including heading down the wrong way in an escalator while in character. He was also given responsibility for overseeing the use of weapons on the set.

In other films, Hill played such roles as a bum in a bar, a detective, a priest and was an announcer at a basketball game together with Marv Albert. He played a security guard in the 1979 film The Fish That Saved Pittsburgh which also starred Julius Erving, a bailiff in the 1980 move Death Penalty, Kilroy in the 1985 film Rappin' with Mario Van Peebles and the priest in the 1992 horror film Hellraiser III: Hell on Earth. He was second assistant director on Romero's 1981 Knightriders.

He started Sharclay Casting with his wife, recruiting individuals as extras and for minor roles. They appeared at zombie conventions. He cast extras and other additional roles for the films All the Right Moves starring Tom Cruise released in 1983, the 1986 film Gung Ho directed by Ron Howard and 1988's Dominick and Eugene that starred Tom Hulce and Ray Liotta.

He and his wife returned to the screen with roles in the film End Game. He was cast in the horror film River of Darkness with Kurt Angle, which would have been his first lead role.

A resident of Burgettstown, Pennsylvania, he died at the age of 78 on July 26, 2009, from pneumonia. He was survived by his wife, a daughter, son, and five grandchildren.
