= Beijo 2348/72 =

- Directed by: Walter Rogério
- Starring: Maitê Proença; Chiquinho Brandão; Fernanda Torres; Antônio Fagundes; Ary Fontoura
- Cinematography: Adrian Cooper
- Music by: Dino Vicente
- Distributed by: Embrafilme
- Release date: July 29, 1994
- Running time: 100 minutes
- Country: Brazil
- Language: Portuguese

Beijo 2348/72 is a 1990 Brazilian film directed by Walter Rogério. The film was released after four years in 1994.

== Cast ==
- Maitê Proença.... Catarina
- Chiquinho Brandão.... Norival
- Fernanda Torres.... Claudete
- Antônio Fagundes.... dr. Paulo
- Ary Fontoura.... Alvarino
- Cláudio Mamberti.... Norival lawyer
- Miguel Falabella.... Zeca
- Iara Jamra.... Cármen
- Joel Barcelos ...archivist
- Gianfrancesco Guarnieri.... photographer
- Eloísa Mafalda.... pension owner
- Walmor Chagas.... Supreme Court Judge
- Miriam Pires.... workwoman
- Sérgio Mamberti.... judge
- Genival Lacerda.... singer
- Dani Patarra.... Dolores

== Awards ==
1990: Festival de Brasília

1. Best Picture (won)
2. Best Actor (Chiquinho Brandão) (won)
3. Best Supporting Actor (Joel Barcelos) (won)

1990: Gramado Film Festival

1. Best Picture (Nominee)
2. Best Editing (won)
3. Best Cinematography (won)

== Reception ==
The critic of the newspaper Folha de S. Paulo wrote: "Without any social criticism but joyfully presenting the miseries of the proletariat, "Beijo 2348/72" thus benefits from a peculiar comic lightness."
