= Belém, Paraíba =

Belém
- Municipality
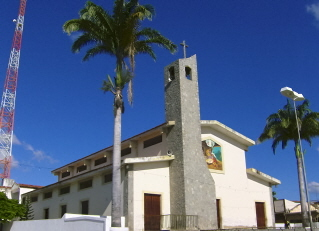

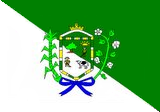
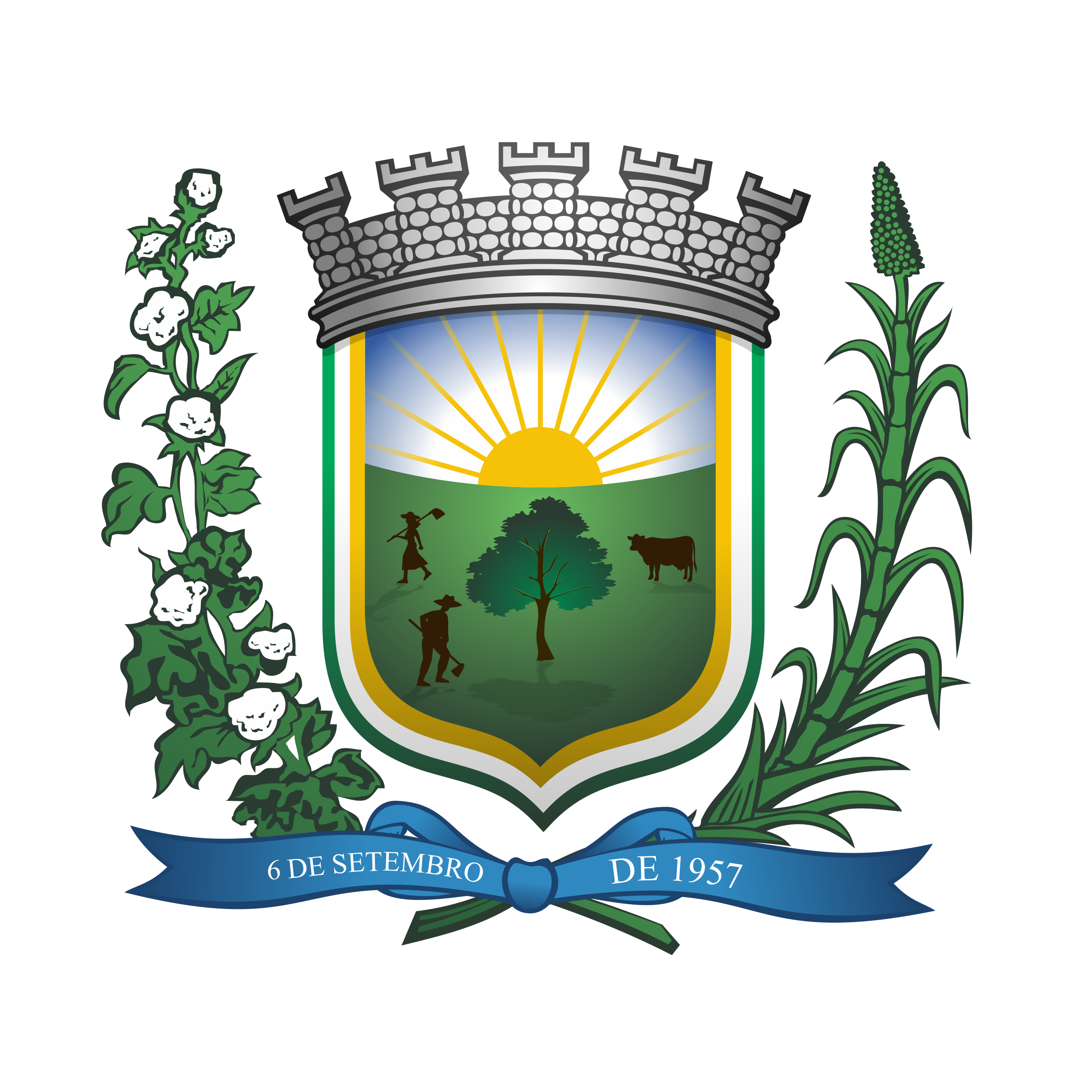
- Flag Coat of arms

- Location in Paraíba state

- Location in Brazil
- Coordinates: 6°44′05″S 35°31′01″W
- Country: Brazil
- Region: Northeast
- State: Paraíba

Population (2020)
  - Total: 17,705
- Time zone: UTC−3 (BRT)

Belém (Central northeastern portuguese pronunciation: [bɛˈlẽj]) is a municipality in Paraíba state in the Northeast Region of Brazil.
