= The Cambridge Squatter =

Cambridge Squatter
- Official release poster
- Era o Hotel Cambridge
- Directed by: Eliane Caffé
- Starring: José Dumont, Suely Franco, Carmen Silva
- Release date: 2016
- Running time: 99 minutes
- Country: Brazil
- Language: Brazilian Portuguese

The Cambridge Squatter (Brazilian Portuguese: Era o Hotel Cambridge) is a 2016 Brazilian film directed by Eliane Caffé. It tells a fictionalised version of the occupation of the Cambridge Hotel in innercity São Paulo. Filmed mainly in the building, actual squatters act alongside well-known Brazilian actors such as José Dumont and Suely Franco.

== Synopsis ==
The film tracks the occupation of the Cambridge Hotel by low-paid workers and refugees. It is a large 15 storey building in the innercity of São Paulo. The squatters include people from the Congo, Haiti, Syria and Palestine as well as from Brazil. From the established actors, José Dumont plays Apolo, who in a film within the film is workshopping a documentary set in the building and Suely Franco is Gilda, an elderly circus performer. A charismatic housing activist is played by Carmen Silva (who is in real life a campaigner with Frente de Luta por Moradia (FLM, or the Front for Housing Struggle)). Filming mostly inside the squat, the camera follows the different characters as they go about their daily routines of cooking food, skyping family members, attending meetings and interacting with each other. The threat of eviction is seen off after Silva encourages everyone to throw coconuts at the police on the street.

== Production ==
In order to get everyone on the same level, Caffé ran a series of workshops for a year with the actors and the squatters. After the film was completed, the art director (and sister of the director) Carla Caffé produced a book about the production process which was called The Cambridge Squatter. The book explains that the film-makers helped to build a vegetable garden and taught camera workshops.

== Reviews ==
The film received generally positive reviews. Cineuropa said that Caffé reveals "with a brutal candour tempered by humour and affection, a glimpse of the everyday lives of the protagonists". FIPRESCI commented that the film was not perfect but "the essence is a timely film, global and urgent". Hollywood Reporter concluded that "this uneven film delivers a potent combination of empathy and food for thought, not unlike a coconut thrown at the establishment's head".

== Accolades ==
At the Rio de Janeiro International Film Festival, the film won Best Film (Audience), Best Brazilian Film and Best Editing.
