= Richard Woolley (filmmaker) =

British filmmaker (born 1948)

- Born: 1948 (age 77–78)
- Occupation: Film director
- Years active: 1973–1988

Richard Woolley (born 1948) is a British filmmaker, whose films received recognition in the 1970s and 1980s. Since 1990 he has primarily concentrated on film-related educational activities, and script and novel writing.

== Life ==
He was educated at London University, where he co-directed a documentary on attitudes to homosexuality in the aftermath of the UK's Sexual Offences Act 1967, and at the Royal College of Art, where he made a series of experimental shorts. He further developed his cinematic skills whilst on a DAAD artist's bursary in West Berlin, and his two Berlin films – along with a further UK-based film – looked at the relationship of sound and image and the nature of cinematic manipulation in the contexts of 70s Germany (East and West) and 70s Britain. Moving on, in 1978, to incorporate a more conventional narrative style, he made Telling Tales, a film that centred on two couples with opposing interests in an industrial strike. His next film, Brothers and Sisters, made in 1980, at the time of the Yorkshire Ripper investigation, centred on the murder of a prostitute and looked at male attitudes to women across the social spectrum. The film was entered into the 12th Moscow International Film Festival.

He made two further films, Girl from the South and Waiting for Alan, before retiring as a film director to concentrate on educational activities and writing. In 1990 he set up the Northern School of Film & Television at Leeds Metropolitan University, and in 1992 became the first non-Dutch director of the Netherlands's national film school, the Netherlands Film and Television Academy. In 1997 he went to Hong Kong to set up a new School of Film & Television for the Hong Kong Academy for Performing Arts. He remained in Hong Kong for eight years as the first Dean of the new school, with just one year back in the Netherlands to set up – and briefly hold – the post of script commissioner or Intendant for the Netherlands Film Fund, when his commissions included scripts for two successful Dutch feature films Minoes (Undercover Kitty) and De Storm. In September 2005 he became inaugural holder of the Greg Dyke Chair of Film & Television at the University of York and the university's first Professor of Film & Television. In the early 80s he presented film reviews on Yorkshire Television's Calendar Carousel arts programme, and between 1997 and 2000 was a contributor to the Dutch Film Magazine Skrien where his column 'Hong Kong Post' appeared on a monthly basis. He has written three published novels – with particular interest being shown in his novel Back in 1984 – and released two CDs of songs. In the 1970s, in addition to filmmaking, he worked as a performer and musician with the Red Ladder Theatre Company in Leeds.

== Reception ==
Writing in 1977 about the early films, American critic Deke Dusinberre said: "A serious and thorough artist, Woolley’s films collectively encompass all those issues which are at the centre of current critical debate". Reviewing Telling Tales in Time Out magazine for a 1986 National Film Theatre retrospective, Nigel Pollitt wrote: "A rare chance to see this ambitious and often hilarious drama of class relations and the relative power of narrative forms". Opinions of Brothers and Sisters ranged from Virginia Dignam's enthusiasm in the UK's Morning Star newspaper ("[this] is the radical answer to exploitive shock horror films about women and proves that a man can make a truly feminist film"), through Philip French's approval in The Observer ("Merging Priestley’s 'An Inspector Calls' with Bertolucci’s 'The Grim Reaper', it is a continuously interesting picture, formally adroit and persuasively acted"), to the more reticent tone of Andrew Tudor in New Society weekly ("I don’t think he has entirely succeeded, but [it] is a far more interesting film than most of what is pumped through our local Odeons.") The film Girl from the South won the CIFEJ Award (Centre International du Film pour l' Enfant et la Jeunesse) at the Laon International Film Festival for Young People in 1989, and, in 2011, the British Film Institute issued a DVD boxset of Woolley's key work under the title An Unflinching Eye, stating, "this collection offers the long-overdue opportunity to experience first hand the power of [his] extraordinary and unique films".

== Works ==
=== Films ===
- We who have Friends (1970)
- A Prison Should be Dark (1971)
- In Between Peace (1972)
- Chromatic (1972)
- Ten Shots (1973)
- Propaganda (1973)
- Freedom (1973)
- Kniephofstrasse (1973)
- Drinnen und Draussen (Inside and Outside, 1974)
- Illusive Crime (1976)
- Telling Tales (1978)
- Brothers and Sisters (1980)
- Waiting for Alan (1984)
- Girl from the South (1988)

=== Books ===
- Back in 1984 (2010)
- Sad-eyed Lady of the Lowlands (2009)
- Friends & Enemies (2009)

=== CDs ===
- Double Dutch (2010)
- Back in 1984 (2009)
