= Prestes Maia (building) =

Squatted highrise building in São Paulo, Brazil

Coordinates: 23°32′6.26″S 46°38′1.32″W

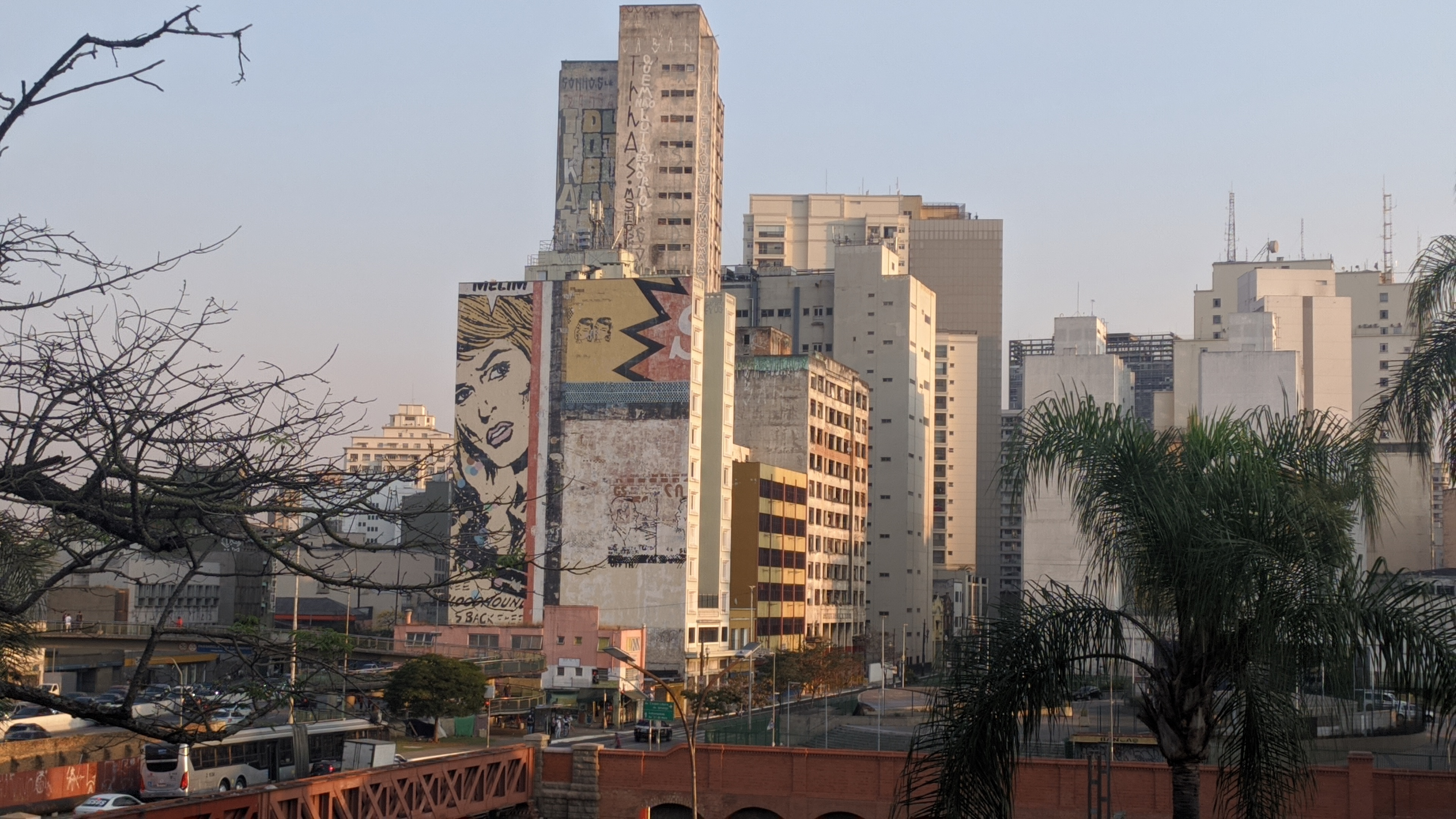
Prestes Maia building

The Prestes Maia building, or sometimes simply Prestes Maia (Portuguese pronunciation: [ˈpɾɛstʃiz ˈmajjɐ]), is believed to be the largest squatted highrise building in South America, with an estimated 2000 inhabitants. The complex is made up of two tower blocks, Bloco A and Bloco B, the latter of which has the address Avenida Prestes Maia, 911 near Luz Station in downtown São Paulo. Businessman Jorge Nacle Hamuche purchased the building at auction in 1993 and co-owns it with his business partner, Eduardo Amorim. The building remains registered to the previous owner, the bankrupt National Cloth Company (Companhia Nacional de Tecidos in Portuguese), where Hamuche had been employed.

468 families, united through the Downtown Roofless Movement (Movimento Sem Teto do Centro or MSTC) of São Paulo, have lived in the 22-storey highrise since 2002.

The building had been closed and left in a rundown condition for years. The new residents cleaned out rubbish and litter, organized it, and expelled drug and other criminal bosses. It contained a free library, workshops, and hosted autonomous educational, social and other cultural activities. In the last few years of the squat, it was an experiment in organizing a real human renewal of downtown São Paulo.

The building was to be returned to its legal owner, who in the previous 15 years had accumulated a debt in municipal taxes of some 5.5 million reais (approximately US$2.2 million or 1.4 million euros), which is close to the amount the building is worth (near R$7 million).

== Occupation timeline ==
Demonstration against the eviction

- January 27, 2006 — Representatives met with the police authorities in charge of the forthcoming eviction. During the meeting, it was made clear that the eviction would take place somewhere between the 15th and 21st of February (an exact date was not given for 'strategic' reasons). The families were advised to leave the building before the eviction to avoid "unpleasant encounters", and when they asked where they were supposed to go, the answer was: 'to the streets or elsewhere'.
- February 7, 2006 — The residents of the Prestes Maia building staged a street blockade for almost 2 hours to draw attention to their plight.
- February 13–14th, 2006 — About 200 people congregated at Prestes Maia anxious for the news and information. They were told that repossession of ownership had been postponed for an indeterminate period. The residents celebrated and thanked the support of the groups, individuals, lawyers and others who had helped the campaign.

The residents succeeded in gaining some concessions for relocation from the government, such as financial aid for rental and credit plans.

A gradual removal of the residents to other locations in downtown São Paulo was undertaken, with varying degrees of government promises and assistance, and since July 2007 the building has been closed.

- October 2008 — The building was still closed and barricaded with concrete blocks.
- October 2010 — The occupation was resumed with an estimated 300 families living inside the building.
- April 2015 - the local governments buys the building from its past owner.

== Films ==
- Prestes Maia - freedom in concrete. Documentary by Levin Peter, Jonas Ginter, Marla Fee Wilke. 52 min, in coproduction with ZDF/Arte. A production of gebrueder beetz filmproduktion (www.gebrueder-beetz.de). Germany 2008.
- Tower of Babel (2007) with subtitles. A Brazilian documentary written and directed by Felipe Seffrin and Dirceu Neto, orientation: Fernando Crocomo. Federal University of Santa Catarina Department of Journalism.
- The Magic Carriage Hero (O Herói da Carruagem Mágica) – Independent ‘Cordel’-documentary that tells the story of the creators of Prestes Maia Community Library. By Philippe Bertrand. 15 min. Brazil 2007.

== See also ==
- Landless Workers' Movement (Movimento dos Trabalhadores Sem Terra (MST) in Portuguese)
- favela
- Rocinha
