= Pagu (disambiguation) =

Patrícia Rehder Galvão, known by her pseudonym Pagu (1910-1962) was a Brazilian writer.

Pagu may also refer to:

- Eternamente Pagú, a film about Patrícia Rehder Galvão
- PAGU, an acronym of Projektions-AG Union, a German film company
- Pagu language of Indonesia
- Pågu, the historical settlement at Pago Bay, Guam
- Cadernos Pagu, a Brazilian academic journal
