= Pirate Jenny =

1928 song by Bertolt Brecht and Kurt Weill

Song
- Language: German
- English title: Pirate Jenny
- Published: 1928
- Genre: Cabaret
- Composer: Kurt Weill
- Lyricist: Bertolt Brecht

"Pirate Jenny" (German: "Seeräuber-Jenny") is a song from The Threepenny Opera (1928) by Kurt Weill, with lyrics by Bertolt Brecht. The English lyrics are by Marc Blitzstein. It is one of the best known songs in the opera, along with "Mack the Knife".

== Content and context ==
The song depicts Low-Dive Jenny (German: Spelunken-Jenny), a character borrowed from John Gay's The Beggar's Opera, and he in turn based that character on the historical person of Jenny Diver (1700–1741). Low-Dive Jenny is a lowly maid at a "crummy old hotel", imagining avenging herself for the contempt she endures from the townspeople. A pirate ship – with eight sails, and with 50 cannons – enters the harbor, fires on the city and flattens every building except the hotel. The pirates come ashore, chain up all the townspeople, and present them to Jenny, who orders the pirates to kill them all. She then sails away with the pirates.

The song was originally placed in the first act and sung by Mackie's bride, Polly Peachum, who resents her parents' opposition to her trying her luck with Mackie and is fantasizing about avenging herself on the constraints of her family. However, the song is frequently moved to the second act and given to the prostitute Jenny. Jenny has given Mackie, her former lover, shelter from the police but is jealous of his wife, Polly. Eventually, she tips off the police, who catch Mackie and take him to his hanging. Her song suggests that she likes the idea of having Mackie's fate in her hands.

== Cover versions ==
Many notable artists have covered this song independently of the stage show: Lotte Lenya (who originated the role of Jenny), Nina Simone in a highly dramatic live performance, Ute Lemper, Milva, Hildegard Knef, The Dresden Dolls, Judy Collins, Marc Almond, Marianne Faithfull, Steeleye Span, and Bea Arthur. Esther & Abi Ofarim recorded the song for their album 2 In 3 (1967). The Young Gods covered the song in their tribute album The Young Gods Play Kurt Weill (1991). Xiu Xiu covered the song in their Nina Simone tribute album Nina (2013). Shilpa Ray covered the song with Nick Cave and Warren Ellis on Son of Rogues Gallery: Pirate Ballads, Sea Songs & Chanteys (2013).

== In popular culture ==
- The song was an inspiration for Bob Dylan's "When the Ship Comes In". As a tribute to Lotte Lenya, Dylan later put the artwork for one of her albums on display on the cover of his 1965 album Bringing It All Back Home. In his 2004 memoir, Dylan described the enormous influence that "Pirate Jenny" had on his songwriting development.
- John Darnielle of the American indie-rock/indie-folk/erstwhile lo-fi band the Mountain Goats has mentioned the 'explicit connection' between Pirate Jenny and his song character "Jenny" who appeared in songs from his albums All Hail West Texas, Jenny from Thebes and some other specific Mountain Goats songs.
- Clifford Harper drew a graphic adaptation of the song, entitled "The Black Freighter" in the magazine Anarchy No. 2.
- Comic-book writer Alan Moore cited this song as one of the inspirations for the Black Freighter pirate material in Watchmen. The Nina Simone version also appears on the soundtrack for the motion picture, and during the credits of the direct-to-video animated feature Tales of the Black Freighter. In the 2019 TV series, Jessica Camacho portrays "Pirate Jenny", a member of the Tulsa police.
- In The League of Extraordinary Gentlemen, also written by Alan Moore, Jenny's revenge fantasy is taken as a literal event in which "Janni", who is Captain Nemo's daughter, is gang raped and summons the crew of the Nautilus to slaughter her rapists and the indifferent spectators alike.
- The song was inspiration for Lars von Trier's Dogville (2003), a film about a mistreated woman who seeks revenge on the residents of the titular town who, having first sheltered her from pursuit, have enslaved her.
- The song is paraphrased on Chico Buarque's "Geni e o Zepelim". This song is a number from his musical play Ópera do Malandro, which is based on Brecht's The Threepenny Opera. In Chico's version, Jenny (Geni) ends up saving the city, just to be despised (again) immediately after.
- Sasha Velour performed a version of the song, with lyrics altered to be about drag, in their short film Pirate Jenny, the first of their 2018 anthology One Dollar Drags.
- The title is referenced in the song "U (Man Like)" by Wisconsin-based band Bon Iver on their fourth studio album I, I.
- The lyrics of the song "Working for the Men" by Drab City paraphrase the story of Pirate Jenny.
- The 1999 song "Ich erinnere mich an die Weimarer Republik" by The World/Inferno Friendship Society references Pirate Jenny as a character who runs a bar and is introduced with the line "Pirate Jenny, she got her revenge, hey boys hats off to her."
