= O Olho Mágico do Amor =

1981 film directed by José Antônio Garcia, Ícaro Martins

- Directed by: José Antonio Garcia; Ícaro Martins
- Written by: José Antonio Garcia; Ícaro Martins
- Produced by: Adone Fragano
- Starring: Carla Camurati; Tânia Alves
- Cinematography: Antonio Meliande
- Edited by: Jair Garcia Duarte
- Production company: Olympus Filmes
- Release date: March 8, 1982 (Brazil)
- Running time: 95 minutes
- Country: Brazil
- Language: Portuguese

O Olho Mágico do Amor is a 1982 Brazilian film directed by José Antônio Garcia and Ícaro Martins.

== Cast ==
- Carla Camurati ... Vera / secretary
- Tânia Alves ... Penélope / prostitute
- Ênio Gonçalves ... Átila / Penélope's gigolo
- Sérgio Mamberti ... Prolíxenes / Vera's boss
- Tito Alencastro ... Nelson
- Walter Casagrande ... Himself
