= Miskolci =

Miskolci may refer to

- Miskolc, a city in Hungary
  - Miskolci AK, a Hungarian football club based in Miskolc
  - Miskolci VSC, a Hungarian football club based in Miskolc
  - Miskolci VLC, a Hungarian water polo club based in Miskolc
- Richard Miskolci, Brazilian sociologist
