= O Corpo =

1991 film by José Antônio de Barros Garcia

- Directed by: José Antonio Garcia
- Written by: Alfredo Oroz; José Antonio Garcia
- Story by: Clarice Lispector
- Produced by: Adone Fragano; Anibal Massaini Neto
- Starring: Antônio Fagundes; Marieta Severo; Cláudia Jimenez
- Cinematography: Antonio Meliande
- Edited by: Eder Mazzini; Danilo Tadeu
- Production companies: Cinearte; Olympus Filmes
- Distributed by: Riofilme; Paris Vídeo
- Release date: 3 May 1996
- Running time: 80 minutes
- Country: Brazil
- Language: Portuguese

O Corpo is a 1991 Brazilian comedy film directed by José Antônio de Barros Garcia, based on the adaptation of Clarice Lispector's eponymous tale. It stars Antônio Fagundes, Marieta Severo, Cláudia Jimenez and Carla Camurati.

== Cast ==
- Antônio Fagundes… Xavier
- Marieta Severo… Carmem
- Cláudia Jimenez… Beatriz (Bia)
- Sérgio Mamberti… delegado
- Carla Camurati… Monique
- Maria Alice Vergueiro… delegate's wife
- Arrigo Barnabé
- Guilherme de Almeida Prado
- Daniel Filho
- Carlos Reichenbach

== Awards ==
1991: Festival de Brasília (Brasília Festival of Brazilian Cinema) 1991

1. Best Film (won)
2. Best Actress (Marieta Severo and Cláudia Jimenez) (won)
3. Best Screenplay (Alfredo Oroz) (won)
4. Best Art Direction (Felipe Crescenti) (won)
5. Best Music (Paulo Barnabé) (won)
6. Best Editing (Danilo Tadeu and Eder Mazzini) (won)

1993: Cartagena Film Festival

1. Best Film (won)
2. Best Actor (Antônio Fagundes) (won)
3. Best Screenplay (José Antonio Garcia and Alfredo Oroz) (won)

1997: São Paulo Association of Art Critics Awards

1. Best Actress (Marieta Severo) (won)
2. Best Screenplay (José Antonio Garcia and Alfredo Oroz) (won)
