= Asian Journal of Women's Studies =

- Discipline: Women's studies
- Language: English
- Edited by: Pilwha Chang

Publication details
- History: 1995–present
- Publisher: Ewha Womans University Press (South Korea)
- Frequency: Quarterly
- Impact factor: 0.214 (2015)

Standard abbreviations
- ISO 4: Asian J. Women's Stud.

Indexing
- ISSN: 1225-9276 (print); 2377-004X (web)
- LCCN: 99110935
- OCLC no.: 60630333

Links
- Journal homepage; Online archive; Taylor and Francis (volume 21 onwards)

Asian Journal of Women's Studies is a quarterly peer-reviewed academic journal published by Ewha Womans University Press. Its articles have a theoretical focus, and its country reports provide information on specific subjects and countries. The journal also publishes research notes and book reviews containing information on recent publications on women in Asia and elsewhere. The editor-in-chief is Pilwha Chang (The Halle Institute, Emory University).

From January 2015 the journal began to also be published by Taylor and Francis.

== Abstracting and indexing ==
The journal is abstracted and indexed in:

- Social Sciences Citation Index
- Current Contents/Social & Behavioral Sciences
- ProQuest databases

According to the Journal Citation Reports, the journal has a 2015 impact factor of 0.214, ranking it =37th out of 40 journals in the category "Women's Studies".

== See also ==
- List of women's studies journals
