= List of women's studies journals =

This is a list of peer-reviewed, academic journals in the field of women's studies.

Note: there are many important academic magazines that are not true peer-reviewed journals. They are not listed here.

== A ==
- Affilia
- Asian Journal of Women's Studies
- Asian Women
- Australian Feminist Studies

== C ==
- Cadernos Pagu
- Clio. Femmes, genre, histoire

== D ==
- Differences

== E ==
- European Journal of Women's Studies

== F ==
- Feminism & Psychology
- Feminist Economics
- Feminist Formations
- Feminist Legal Studies
- Feminist Review
- Feminist Studies
- Feminist Theory
- Feministische Studien
- Frontiers: A Journal of Women Studies

== G ==
- Gender and Language
- Gender & Society
- Gender, Place & Culture: A Journal of Feminist Geography
- Gender, Technology and Development
- Gender, Work and Organization

== H ==
- Health Care for Women International
- Hypatia: A Journal of Feminist Philosophy

== I ==
- Indian Journal of Gender Studies
- International Feminist Journal of Politics
- International Journal of Feminist Approaches to Bioethics

== J ==
- Journal of Gender Studies
- Journal of Middle East Women's Studies
- Journal of Women & Aging
- Journal of Women, Politics & Policy
- Journal of Women's Health
- Journal of Women's History

== P ==
- PhiloSOPHIA
- Politics & Gender
- Psychology of Women Quarterly

== R ==
- Radical Philosophy

== S ==
- Sex Roles
- Signs: Journal of Women in Culture and Society
- Social Politics

== V ==
- Violence Against Women

== W ==
- Women & Health
- Women & Therapy
- Women's Health Issues
- Women's Studies in Communication
- Women's Studies International Forum
- Women's Studies Quarterly
