= Mamberti =

Mamberti is a surname. Notable people with the surname include:

- Dominique Mamberti (born 1952), French Catholic prelate
- Sérgio Mamberti (1939–2021), Brazilian actor
