= Norma Bengell =

Brazilian actress (1935–2013)

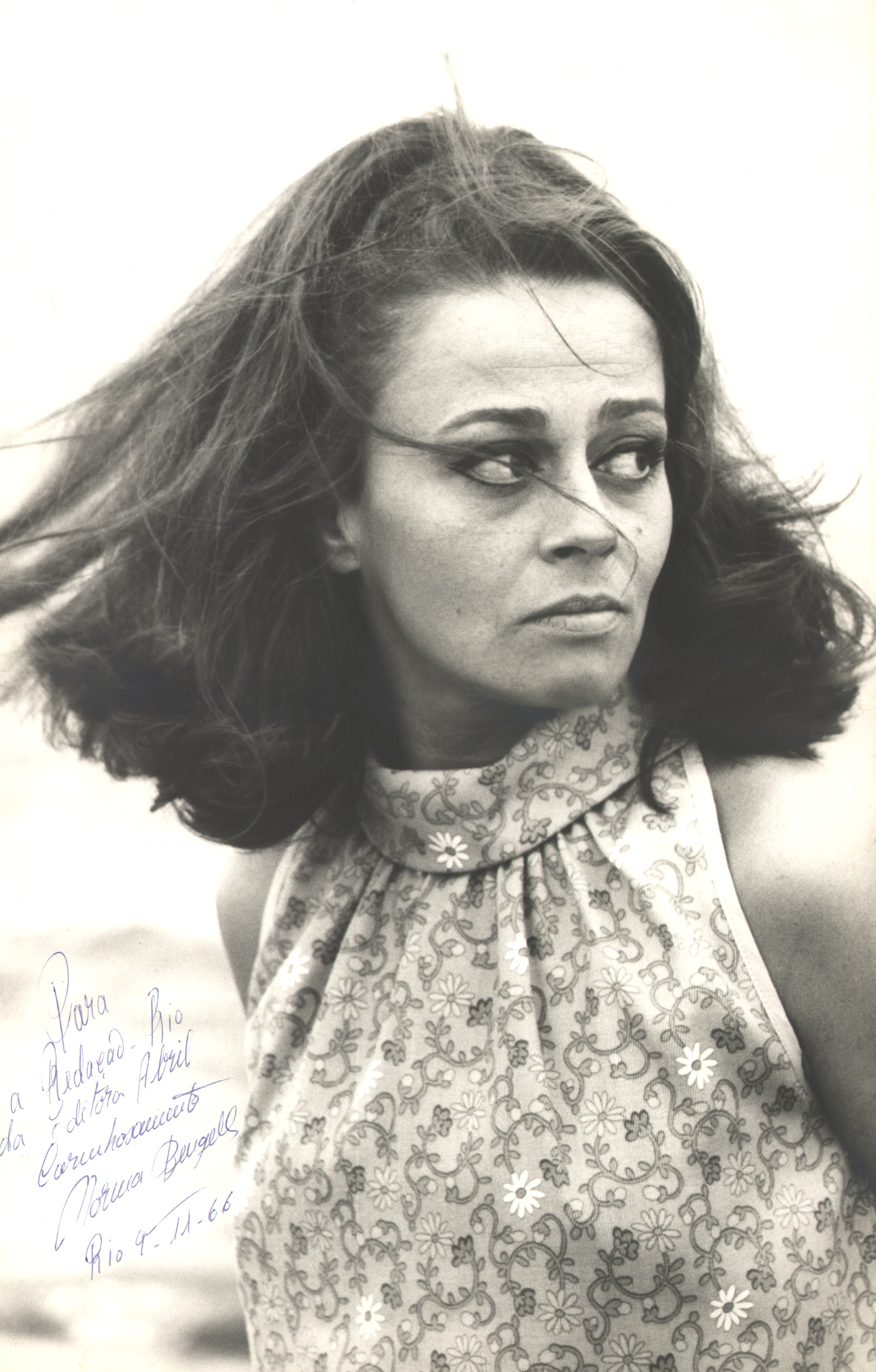
- Bengell in 1966
- Born: 21 February 1935; Rio de Janeiro, Brazil
- Died: 9 October 2013 (aged 78); Rio de Janeiro, Brazil
- Occupations: Actress; film director; screenwriter; singer-songwriter
- Years active: 1959–2010

Norma Aparecida Almeida Pinto Guimarães d'Áurea Bengell (21 February 1935 – 9 October 2013) was a Brazilian film, stage and television actress, singer-songwriter, screenwriter and director. She appeared in several episodes of T.H.E. Cat, the first being in 1966 episode "To Kill a Priest".

== Early life ==
Bengell was born in Rio de Janeiro, Brazil.

== Career ==
Bengell appeared in numerous international productions, including an extended period during the mid-1960s co-starring in Italian productions, in which she was usually cast as the protagonist's romantic interest. She is possibly best known for starring with Alberto Sordi in Alberto Lattuada's Mafioso (1962) and in Sergio Corbucci's The Hellbenders (1967). She had a major role as a prostitute in Anselmo Duarte's Keeper of Promises (1962), a Brazilian drama that was nominated for the Academy Award for Best Foreign Language Film in 1963 and won the Golden Palm at Cannes Film Festival in 1962. Earlier that same year, she caused major controversy after appearing nude in a scene of the Ruy Guerra film Os Cafajestes.

In 1987, she directed her first film, Eternamente Pagu, a biography of Patrícia Galvão. In 1996, she directed an adaptation of José de Alencar's novel The Guarani, also titled The Guarani.

== Filmography ==
=== Film ===
Year	Title	Role	Notes	Ref.
1959	O Homem do Sputnik	B.B	Performing a parody of Brigitte Bardot	
1960	Conceição	Dalva		
1961	Mulheres e Milhões	Nora Martins		
1962	Mafioso	Marta		
1962	Keeper of Promises (Portuguese: O Pagador de Promessas)	Marli		
1962	The Unscrupulous Ones (Portuguese: Os Cafajestes)	Leda		
1962	Carnival of Crime	Milly		
1963	The Broken Hearts (Italian: I cuori infranti)	Milena	Segment: "E vissero felici"	
1963	Il mito	Anna	Second segment	
1963	La ballata dei mariti	The Countess		
1964	La costanza della ragione	Ivana		
1964	Men and Women (Portuguese: Noite Vazia)	Mara		
1965	Mar Corrente	The Singer		
1965	Planet of the Vampires (Italian: Terrore nello spazio)	Sanya		
1965	The Reckless (Italian: Una bella grinta)	Luciana		
1966	As Cariocas	Paula Ribeiro de Castro	First story: "A grã-fina de Copacabana"	
1966	The Hellbenders (Italian: I crudeli)	Claire		
1966	Captain from Toledo (Italian: L'uomo di Toledo)	Myriam		
1967	A Espiã Que Entrou em Fria	—N/a		
1968	Antes, o Verão	Maria Clara		
1968	Desesperato	Rodrigo's wife		
1968	Edu, Coração de Ouro	Matilde	Cameo	
1968	Ballad of a Bounty Hunter (Italian: Io non perdono... uccido)	Fedra/Wanda		
1968	Juventude e Ternura	—N/a		
1969	O Anjo Nasceu	Housewife		
1969	OSS 117 Takes a Vacation	Anne		
1969	Verão de Fogo	Olga		
1970	The Palace of Angels (Portuguese: O Palácio dos Anjos)	Dorothy		
1970	Of Gods and the Undead (Portuguese: Os Deuses e os Mortos)	Soledade		
1971	A Casa Assassinada	Nina		
1971	As Confissões de Frei Abóbora	Paula		
1971	O Capitão Bandeira contra o Dr. Moura Brasil	Messenger		
1971	Paixão na Praia	Débora		
1972	O Demiurgo	—N/a		
1973	Défense de savoir	—N/a		
1973	Les soleils de l'île de Pâques	Norma		
1975	Assim Era a Atlântida	Herself	Documentary	
1976	Paranoia	Sílvia Riccelli		
1977	Maria Bonita	—N/a		
1977	Barra Pesada	—N/a		
1977	The Abyss	Madame Zero		
1978	Mar de Rosas	Felicidade		
1978	Na Boca do Mundo	Clarisse		
1978	Mulheres de Cinema	Herself	Short film	
1980	The Age of the Earth (Portuguese: A Idade da Terra)	Amazonas Queen		
1981	Abrigo Nuclear	Lix/Professor		
1981	Eros, o Deus do Amor	Ada		
1982	Tabu	Madame Xavier		
1982	Rio Babilônia	Madame Solange		
1982	Tensão no Rio	Dona Dolores		
1984	O Filho Adotivo	Maria Rosa		
1986	A Cor do Seu Destino	Laura		
1986	Fonte da Saudade	Mother		
1987	Running Out of Luck	Lola		
1987	A Mulher Fatal Encontra o Homem Ideal	Elegant actress		
1988	Eternamente Pagú	Elsie Houston		
1988	Fronteiras	—N/a		
1992	Floresta da Tijuca	Narrator	Short film	
1993	Vagas para Moças de Fino Trato	Gertrudes		
2002	Banquete	Beggar	Short film	
2003	Glauber, o filme – Labirinto do Brasil	Herself	Documentary	
2007	Anabazys	Herself	Documentary	
2009	Dzi Croquettes	Herself	Documentary	

=== Director ===
Year	Title
1979	Maria Gladys, uma atriz brasileira
1980	Maria da Penha
1980	O Barco de Iansã
1988	Eternamente Pagu
1996	O Guarani
2003	Infinitivamente Guiomar Novaes
2003	Antonietta Rudge: O Êxtase em Movimento
2004	Magda Tagliaferro: O Mundo Dentro de um Piano

=== Television ===
Year	Title	Role	Notes	Ref.
1966	Festival em Shell Maior	Herself / Host	1966–1967	
1966	Noite de Gala	Herself / Host		
1967	A Sombra de Rebecca	Diana		
1981	Os Imigrantes	Nena		
1981	Os Adolescentes	Paula		
1982	Memórias do Medo	Mona		
1983	Parabéns pra Você	Mara		
1984	Partido Alto	Irene Bessa		
1984	Betty Faria Especial	—N/a		
1989	O Sexo dos Anjos	Vera Nogueira		
1993	Você Decide	—N/a	Season 2 Episode: "O Porteiro"	
1993	Você Decide	—N/a	Season 2 Episode: "Paixão Mortal"	
2006	Alta Estação	Yolanda		
2008-09	Toma Lá, Dá Cá	Deise Coturno	Lead role (season 2–3; 48 episodes)	

== Death ==
Bengell died from lung cancer aged 78 in Rio de Janeiro on 9 October 2013.
