= Beatriz Bandeira =

Brazilian human rights activist

- Born: Beatriz Vicencia Bandeira; November 8, 1909; Méier, Rio de Janeiro, Brazil
- Died: January 2, 2012 (aged 102); Rio de Janeiro, Brazil
- Other names: Beatriz Vicência Bandeira Ryff
- Occupations: Poet and writer
- Known for: Opposition to Brazilian dictatorships
- Spouse: Raul Ryff

Beatriz Vicência Bandeira Ryff (November 8, 1909 – January 2, 2012) was a Brazilian communist, human rights activist, poet and writer, who spent two periods in exile from Brazil in the 1930s and 1960s.

== Early life ==
Beatriz Vicência Bandeira Ryff was born in the northern Rio de Janeiro neighbourhood of Méier, on 8 November 1909, to the abolitionists Alípio Abdulino Pinto Bandeira and Rosalia Nansi Bagueira Bandeira. From her maternal grandfather, who taught her to read and write and also taught her French, she inherited a passion for letters, and from her mother, a taste for music. She wrote her first verses at the age of nine, and graduated in piano from the National Music School.

== Activism ==
In the 1930s, she joined the Brazilian Communist Party, through which she met her future husband, journalist Raul Ryff, with whom she had three sons. In 1936, she was arrested for her opposition to the Estado Novo dictatorship and her role in the failed Communist uprising of 1935. She was held in what became the infamous "Room 4" in the Casa de Detenção, in Rio de Janeiro, together with Nise da Silveira, Maria Werneck de Castro, Olga Benário Prestes, Eneida de Moraes and Eugênia Álvaro Moreyra. After her detention, Bandeira was exiled to Uruguay, together with her husband, returning in 1937.

Returning to Brazil, Bandeira wrote for various newspapers and for the magazine Momento Feminino. From 1949 to 1957 she was involved with the Federação de Mulheres do Brasil (Women's Federation of Brazil), an organization promoted by the Communist Party. She worked as a professor of vocal technique at the National Theatre Conservatory in Rio de Janeiro, but in 1964, after the coup that established the military dictatorship, she was fired. She asked for political asylum from Yugoslavia, spending three months at the Yugoslav Embassy in Rio de Janeiro, before travelling to the country, together with her husband and other opponents of the regime. Later, the two moved to France where her husband worked for French TV and Bandeira covered fashion shows for a Brazilian news agency.

Bandeira returned to Brazil in 1967, as a result of a government amnesty, helping to found the Women's Movement for Amnesty and Democratic Liberties. She continued to write poetry and published a biography of her father, together with her sister, and memoirs from her time in exile in Yugoslavia.

== Death ==
Beatriz Bandeira died in Rio de Janeiro on 2 January 2012. Her husband predeceased her. She was buried at the São João Batista Cemetery, in Botafogo.
