= Mafioso (film) =

1962 Italian film by Alberto Lattuada

- The Spanish movie poster.
- Directed by: Alberto Lattuada
- Written by: Rafael Azcona; Bruno Caruso; Marco Ferreri; Agenore Incrocci; Furio Scarpelli
- Produced by: Tonino Cervi; Dino De Laurentiis
- Starring: Alberto Sordi; Norma Bengell
- Cinematography: Armando Nannuzzi
- Edited by: Nino Baragli
- Music by: Piero Piccioni; Nino Rota
- Distributed by: Rialto Pictures; Zenith International Films
- Release date: 25 October 1962 (Italy)
- Running time: 100 minutes
- Country: Italy
- Language: Italian

Mafioso is a 1962 Italian Mafia black comedy film directed by Alberto Lattuada. The film stars Alberto Sordi as a factory manager who visits his hometown in Sicily and is tasked with performing a hit for the Mafia. It was awarded Best Film at the San Sebastian Film Festival. In 2008, the film was included on the Italian Ministry of Cultural Heritage’s 100 Italian films to be saved, a list of 100 films that "have changed the collective memory of the country between 1942 and 1978."

== Plot ==
Antonio Badalamenti, a Sicilian, who has settled for many years in Northern Italy and is employed in a car factory in Milan, takes a vacation with his family. He leaves behind the modern conveniences of his home in Northern Italy, to visit his childhood village in Sicily and introduces his blond, northern-Italian wife, Marta, to his mother, father and other relatives back home.

While his wife suffers in the comparatively rustic conditions of her husband's hometown and has trouble adapting to the culture of Sicily, Antonio becomes reacquainted with his childhood friends. He also pays a visit to the local don, Don Vincenzo, who is a crime boss. The don smooths over some problems Antonio had with a deal to buy some property on the island, and in return, Antonio is tasked with carrying out a hit for the mob. As an outsider with no strings attached and a crack shot, Antonio is seen as a perfect candidate.

While his wife is sleeping one night, Antonio leaves for what is purportedly a hunting trip with his friends. In reality, he is put inside a wooden crate and smuggled aboard an airplane into the United States, where he goes to New York City to carry out his task. The job done, he is returned to Sicily in the same manner and arrives back at home as if from the hunting trip. Plagued by what he has done, he goes back to his efficient job at the car factory.

== Cast ==
- Alberto Sordi as Antonio Badalamenti
- Norma Bengell as Marta
- Gabriella Conti as Rosalia
- Ugo Attanasio as Don Vincenzo
- Cinzia Bruno as Donatella
- Katiusca Piretti as Patrizia
- Armando Tine as Dr. Zanchi
- Lilly Bistrattin as Dr. Zanchi's Secretary
- Michèle Bailly as Young Baroness
- Francesco Lo Briglio as Don Calogero
- Carmelo Oliviero as Don Liborio

== Home media ==
It was released in the US by The Criterion Collection, but as of March 31, 2013, the title is out of print.
