= Sole nudo =

1984 film directed by Tonino Cervi

- Directed by: Tonino Cervi
- Written by: Tonino Cervi
- Starring: David Brandon; Tânia Alves; Paolo Bonacelli
- Release dates: 30 October 1984 (Italy); 1984 (Brazil)
- Running time: 107 minutes
- Countries: Italy; Brazil
- Languages: Italian; Portuguese

Sole nudo (Naked Sun) is a 1984 Italian-Brazilian film written and directed by Tonino Cervi.

The film is about Luca Adami who, after troubles at work, escapes from Rome to Rio de Janeiro and is helped by a friend to find a new job there. He has disappointing results, and wants to commit suicide.

In Rio he meets a beautiful girl from the favelas (slums) who takes him to visit the most secret and mystical places of the city. He is also encouraged by an enigmatic waiter and regains the will to live.

The film ends with the two performers dancing on Copacabana beach at dawn.

== Cast ==
- David Brandon as Luca Adami
- Tânia Alves as Regina
- Paolo Bonacelli as the waiter
- Eliana Araujo as the mulatto girl
- Isaura De Assis
- Bebeto Alves
- Carlos de Carvalho as the director
- Dennis Carvalho as De Bernardi
- Antonio Maimone as Giovanni
- Girolamo Marzano as Fabio
