= Journal of Women & Aging =

- Discipline: Women's studies
- Language: English
- Edited by: Francine Conway

Publication details
- History: 1989–present
- Publisher: Routledge
- Frequency: Quarterly
- Impact factor: 0.846 (2015)

Standard abbreviations
- ISO 4: J. Women Aging

Indexing
- CODEN: JWAGE5
- ISSN: 0895-2841 (print); 1540-7322 (web)
- LCCN: 89656519
- OCLC no.: 50120652

Links
- Journal homepage; Online access; Online archive

The Journal of Women & Aging is a quarterly peer-reviewed healthcare journal focusing on health challenges facing women in their later years. The journal was established in 1989 and is published by Routledge. The editor-in-chief is Francine Conway (of Rutgers University).

== Abstracting and indexing ==
The journal is abstracted and indexed in:

- Current Contents/Social & Behavioral Sciences
- Index Medicus/MEDLINE/PubMed
- PsycINFO
- Social Sciences Citation Index

According to the Journal Citation Reports, the journal has a 2015 impact factor of 0.846, ranking it 22nd out of 40 journals in the category "Women's Studies".

== See also ==
- List of women's studies journals
