= Sérgio Mamberti =

Brazilian actor (1939–2021)

Sérgio Mamberti OMC
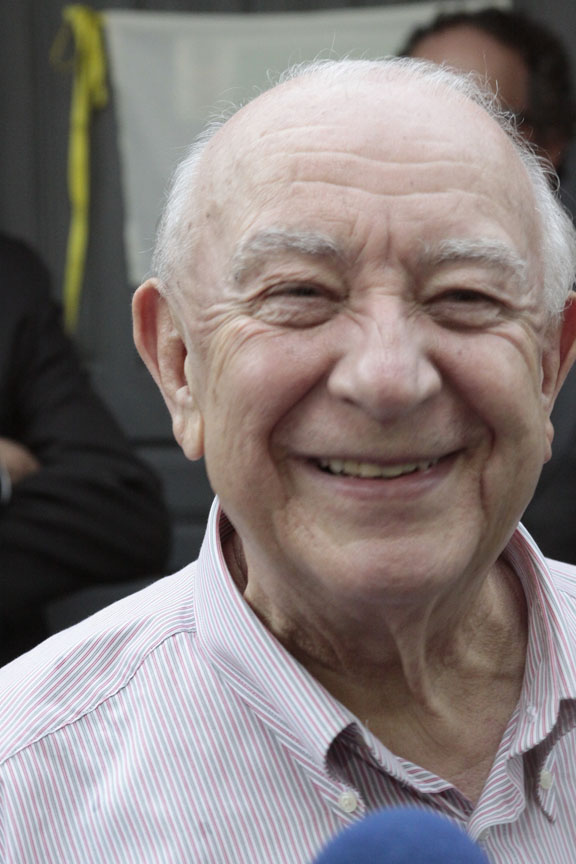
- Mamberti in 2010
- Born: Sérgio Duarte Mamberti; 22 April 1939; Santos, São Paulo, Brazil
- Died: 3 September 2021 (aged 82); São Paulo, Brazil
- Occupations: Actor; filmmaker; painter; writer; politician
- Years active: 1964–2021
- Political party: PT (1980–2021)
- Spouse: Vivian Mehr (m. 1964; died 1980)
- Partner: Ednardo Torquarto (1982–2019, Torquarto's death)
- Children: 3
- Awards: Order of Cultural Merit (Grand Cross)

Sérgio Duarte Mamberti (22 April 1939 – 3 September 2021) was a Brazilian actor, filmmaker, painter, writer, and politician.

== Biography ==
Sérgio Mamberti was born in Santos, São Paulo. He was a graduate of the School of Dramatic Arts of São Paulo, and went on to a career as a playwright which lasted more than 50 years. He was the brother of the actor Cláudio Mamberti.

Affiliated to the Workers' Party (PT), Mamberti occupied several positions during the Lula and Dilma Governments, within the Brazilian Ministry of Culture:

- Secretary of Music and Performing Arts
- Secretary of Identity and Cultural Diversity
- President of the National Arts Foundation (FUNARTE)
- Secretary of Cultural Policies

Mamberti died on 3 September 2021 due to multiple organ dysfunction syndrome.

== Filmography ==
=== Movies ===
Year	Title	Role	Notes
1966	Nudista à força		
1969	O Bandido da Luz Vermelha	Taxi Driver	
1972	O Jogo da Vida e da Morte	Marcelo	
1973	Toda Nudez Será Castigada	Gay man at bordello	
1976	À Flor da Pele	Jorge	
1977	Parada 88 - O Limite de Alerta	Santana	
1979	Maldita Coincidência		
1982	O Olho Mágico do Amor	Prolíxenes / Vera's boss	
1982	Rio Babilônia		
1982	O Homem do Pau-brasil		
1982	Noites Paraguaias		
1984	O Baiano Fantasma	Fortunato	
1985	Avaeté - Semente da Vingança	Senator	
1985	Made in Brazil		(segment "Um Milagre Brasileiro")
1985	Sonho sem Fim		
1987	Brasa Adormecida	Priest	
1987	Anjos da Noite	Apresentador	
1987	A Mulher Fatal Encontra o Homem Ideal		Short
1987	A Menina do Lado	Paulo Maurício	
1987	A Dama do Cine Shanghai	Stan	
1988	Romance		
1988	O Mentiroso		
1988	Fogo e Paixão		
1990	Beijo 2348/72	Judge	
1991	Olímpicos		
1991	O Corpo	Police chief	
1992	Perfume de Gardênia		
1992	Oswaldianas		(segment "Uma Noite com Oswald")
1992	Dudu Nasceu		Video short
1994	O Efeito Ilha	The cardinal	
1994	Mil e Uma		
1994	Dente por Dente		Short
1997	Doces Poderes	Bob	
1999	Hans Staden	Jacó	
1999	Castelo Rá-Tim-Bum, o filme	Dr. Victor	
2000	Tônica Dominante		
2000	Brava Gente Brasileira	Priest	
2001	3 Histórias da Bahia	Teixeirinha	
2003	Xuxa Abracadabra	Tio Nicolas / Merlino	
2006	O Cavaleiro Didi e a Princesa Lili	Sacerdote	
2007	O Homem que Desafiou o Diabo	Coronel Rusevelt	
2008	Bodas de Papel	Sr. Nonato	
2010	Luz nas Trevas: A Volta do Bandido da Luz Vermelha	Neném Jr	
2012	O Inventor de Sonhos	Duque de Alva	
2013	Jogo das Decapitações	Siqueira	

=== Television ===
Year	Telenovelas & Series	Role	Notes
1968	Ana	Tenório	
1969	Algemas de Ouro	Miro	
1970	As Pupilas do Senhor Reitor	João Semana	
1971	Os Deuses Estão Mortos	Padre Antenor	
1971	Quarenta Anos Depois	Padre Antenor	
1979	Meu Nome É Villa-Lobos		
1979	Dinheiro Vivo	Pacheco	
1981	Brilhante	Galeno Sampaio	
1984	Transas e Caretas	Antônio	
1986	Dona Beija	cel. Elias Felizardo	
1987	Helena	Amílcar	
1988	Vale Tudo	Eugênio	
1989	Cortina de Vidro	Cristóvão	
1990	Ana Raio e Zé Trovão	Pupo Valdez	
1990	Pantanal	dr. Arnoud	
1992	As Noivas de Copacabana	dono de boate	
1993	Agosto	senador Freitas	
1993	Olho no Olho	Napoleão "Popô"	
1994	Castelo Rá-Tim-Bum	dr. Victor Stradivarius	
1995	Engraçadinha: Seus Amores e Seus Pecados	tio Nonô	
1996	Dona Anja	pe. Antônio	
1996	O Campeão	Porfírio	
1997	Anjo Mau	Otávio Ferraz	
1998	Labirinto	Geraldo	
2000	A Muralha	Cristóvão	
2001	Estrela-Guia	Alaor Pimenta	
2001	O Clone	Dr. Vilela	
2002	Sabor da Paixão	Silvano	
2004	Da Cor do Pecado	Desembargador Luís Caldeira	
2005	Essas Mulheres	Vigário Lourenço Camargo	
2006	O Profeta	Josias	
2007	Desejo Proibido	frei Domingos	
2011	O Astro	Padre Laurindo	
2013	Flor do Caribe	Dionísio Albuquerque / Klaus Vagner	
2016	Sol Nascente	Dom Manfredo Giulinne	
2016	3%	Matheus	

=== Stage plays ===
Year	Play	Direction
1964	The Caretaker Harold Pinter	Antônio Abujamra
1968	Navalha na Carne Plínio Marcos	Jairo Arco and Flexa
1969	The Balcony Jean Genet	Victor Garcia
1975	Réveillon Flávio Márcio	Paulo José
1980	Calabar Chico Buarque	Fernando Peixoto
1984	Hamlet Shakespeare	Márcio Aurélio
1985	Tartuffe Molière	José Possi Neto
1995	Pérola Mauro Rasi	Mauro Rasi
2001	O Evangelho Segundo Jesus Cristo José Saramago	José Possi Neto
2015	Visiting Mr. Green Jeff Baron	Cássio Scapin
