= Feminist Legal Studies =

- Discipline: Women's studies
- Language: English
- Edited by: Yvette Russell

Publication details
- History: 1993–present
- Publisher: Springer (United Kingdom)
- Frequency: Triannually
- Impact factor: 2.259 (2020)

Standard abbreviations
- ISO 4: Fem. Leg. Stud.

Indexing
- CODEN: FLSTED
- ISSN: 0966-3622 (print); 1572-8455 (web)
- LCCN: 2007233919
- OCLC no.: 44506960

Links
- Journal homepage; Online archive

Feminist Legal Studies is a triannual peer-reviewed legal journal with an international perspective that focuses on feminist work in all areas of law, particularly legal theory and practice. The feminist legal theory is further explored in the journal by generating analyzes and debates on women's rights through varying critical perspectives and theories. The journal offers content in a variety of formats, including observations on current legal developments, interviews, essays, articles, and book reviews. The editorial board welcomes submissions of articles from scholars in any field as well as professionals outside of academia.

== Background on Feminist Legal Studies ==
Feminist Legal Studies was established in 1993 by a group of women working at the University of Kent. The journal gave feminist work a platform at a time when it was difficult to get it published in reputable mainstream legal publications. The journal has supported the advancement of the field of feminist legal studies both in the United Kingdom and abroad. According to the Journal Citation Reports, the journal has a 2020 impact factor of 2.259, ranking it 28th out of 144 journals in the category "Gender Studies".

In the beginning of it publication, the journal focused on areas such as abortion, gender equality in law, and critical examinations of notable Supreme Court cases such as Planned Parenthood v. Casey.

Recently, the journal is focused on areas such as racism in America criminalizing African American youth, worldwide construct theories about gender's ontology, and how COVID-19 exposed the fragility of supply chains.

== Legacy ==
Due to this popularity, the journal has been drawn into the multinational publishing industry. The first publisher of the journal was Deborah Charles Publishing, then was sold to Kluwer, and currently, the journal is published under Springer. While under Springer, the publication has moved from print to online, archiving all of the volumes published since its foundation.

On May 18, 2013, the Editorial Board of Feminist Legal Studies hosted a roundtable discussion at the University of Kent to celebrate the journal's twentieth anniversary. One speaker at the discussion, Rosemary Hunter, claimed that one major change since the 1930s is that there are now many more feminist legal journals where feminists and legal scholars can publish their work. The journal has contributed to increasing awareness around inclusivity on feminist legal perspectives from women of color and queer women. However, the speakers discussed concerns on the lack of teaching in law schools on feminist perspectives of tort law.

== History of Feminist Legal Theory ==
Women's first recognition into legal studies began in the 1970s and 1980s as female student representation and faculty began to increase. In the beginning, it was a struggle for women to fully immerse themselves as both students and faculty members to be considered equally to their male peers. Despite the numerous strides made in achieving gender equality throughout the world, there are many issues that women still face including wage gaps, lack of representation in leadership and governmental positions, and vulnerability to uncontrolled sexual harassment in the workforce.

The contrast between sex and gender offered a way to challenge the ideological presumption that the biological differences between men's and women's sexual orientation justified treating them differently. In general, many of the social structures around the world value and reward masculine traits and behaviors at the expense of feminine ones.

In the 1990s and 2000s, feminism was strengthened by the emergence of critical race feminism that focuses on understanding an intersectional approach to include women of color and lesbians as part of the model for comprehending patriarchy and directing feminism reform. Feminist legal theory faces challenges today, not only from postmodernism, sex positivism, or antifeminist zeal, but also from the fact that it represents a type of normative legal scholarship that is continuously attacked both inside and beyond the legal academia.

== Notable Contributors to the Journal ==
The current editor-in-chief of the journal is Katie Cruz. In addition to being a notable contributor to the journal, Cruz is also a professor at the University of Bristol Law School. Cruz's main research interests include regulation of sex work, labor law, and sex trafficking for labor.

Coordinating Editors

- Kay Lalor
- Kimberley Brayson
- Julia Chryssostalis
- Máiréad Enright
- Laura Graham
- Daniel Grey
- Zainab Naqvi
- Harriet Samuels
- Tanya Serisier
- Leila Ullrich

Book Review Editors

- Kathryn McNeilly
- Flora Renz

Creative Content Editors

- Farnush Ghadery
- Loveday Hodson
- Senthorun Raj

Editorial Board

- Jennifer Aston
- Miriam Bak McKenna
- Yassin Brunger
- Hasret Cetinkaya
- Nadine El-Enany, Birkbeck
- Ruth Fletcher
- Nikki Godden-Rasul
- Lynsey Mitchell
- Emily Jones
- Sheelagh McGuinness
- Patricia Tuitt

International Advisory Board

- Doris Buss
- Margaret Davies
- Kalpana Kannabiran
- Sarah Keenan
- Ambreena Manji
- Karin van Marle
- Vasuki Nesiah

== Abstracting and indexing ==
The journal is abstracted and indexed in:

- Social Sciences Citation Index
- Journal Citation Reports/Social Sciences Edition
- SCOPUS
- EBSCO
- CSA
- ProQuest
- Academic OneFile
- Academic Search
- ANVUR
- Australian Domestic and Family Violence Clearinghouse
- BFI List
- Criminal Justice Abstracts
- CSA Environmental Sciences
- Current Contents / Social & Behavioral Sciences
- CLOCKSS
- CNKI
- CNPIEC
- Current Law Index
- Dimension
- Elsevier BV
- ERIH PLUS
- Gale
- Google Scholar
- Naver
- Norwegian Register for Scientific Journals and Series
- PhilPapers
- Portico
- International Bibliography of Book Reviews (IBR)
- International Bibliography of Periodical Literature (IBZ)
- International Bibliography of the Social Sciences (IBSS)
- Legal Journals Index
- OCLC
- OmniFile
- Religious & Theological Abstracts
- SCImago
- TD Net Discovery Service
- UGC-CARE List (India)

== See also ==
- List of women's studies journals
- Feminist legal theory
- Women in law
