= Eugênia Álvaro Moreyra =

Brazilian journalist, actress and theater director

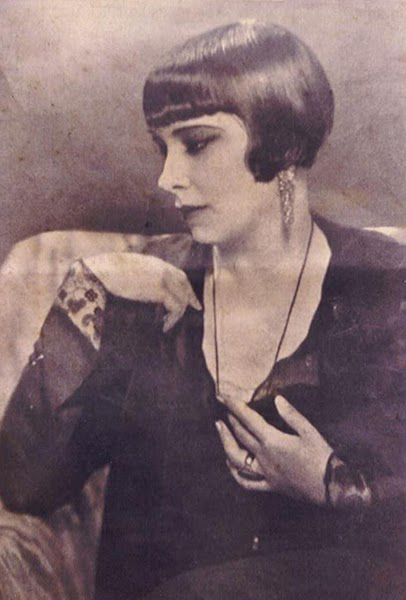
- Eugênia Álvaro Moreyra (1920)
- Born: March 6, 1898; Juiz de Fora
- Died: June 16, 1948 (aged 50); Rio de Janeiro
- Other name: Eugênia Brandão
- Occupation: Journalist
- Known for: Pioneering

Eugênia Álvaro Moreyra (née Eugênia Brandão; March 6, 1898 – June 16, 1948) was a Brazilian journalist, actress and theater director, who became president of the professional theater union. A feminist pioneer, she was a leader of the suffrage campaign in Brazil. She was also linked to the Brazilian modernist movement and was a staunch defender of Communist ideals. She was married to the poet and writer Álvaro Moreyra, who played a major role in the renewal of the Brazilian theater, organizing cultural popularization campaigns and working as an actress, director, translator, declaimer and later president of the union of theater professionals.

== Biography ==
=== Early life and career ===
Eugênia Brandão was born in Juiz de Fora in 1898. Daughter of Dr. Armindo Gomes Brandão and Marie Antoinette Armond Brandão, and granddaughter of Baron Pitangui, she had a comfortable childhood in her hometown, but with the death of Armindo, her family began to face financial difficulties. As her mother could not claim the inheritance left by her husband, which by law should be under the responsibility of her sons, she moved with Eugênia to Rio de Janeiro in the mid-1910s in search of employment. She found work at a branch of the Post Office nearby Lapa, while her daughter, autodidact, learned to read and write in Portuguese and French while reading newspapers, books and dictionaries.

Eugênia got her first job at fifteen as seller of male and female articles at Magazin Parc Royal store, downtown Rio. Shortly after, she began working as clerk at Freitas Bastos, a bookstore located at Largo da Carioca. It is there, amongst the works of national and international authors, that she became fond of theater and literature.

At sixteen, she was fully integrated into the Bohemian life of the city, including behavior and costumes - smoking cigarillos, she walked by the streets dressed in a suit, tie, and fedora. It is like this that she introduced herself at the newspaper Última Hora, looking for a job as journalist. Hired by her well-written text and daring attitude, her recruitment caused bewilderment and admiration in a society hitherto accustomed to seeing females presented by the media only as poetesses, feuilletists, and columnists. A woman practicing journalism was even more unusual, up to the point that even the term "reportess" had to be coined to describe her role.

Shortly after, the journal prematurely reported the end of her career as a young journalist, who had decided to seek refuge in a boarding school for girls in an orphanage called Asilo Bom Pastor. The mystery and the reason for such decision were unraveled only months later, when a report signed by her was published on the front page of the Journal A Rua. As a matter of fact, Eugenia asked to be interned with the sole intention of interviewing Albertina do Nascimento Silva, the sister of a murdered woman in a widely reported crime which became known as "The Tragedy of Dr. Januzzi Street, 13." The woman, however, had already been removed from the asylum, but Eugênia continued living on the site in an attempt to obtain information from other inmates. Not being successful, she took the opportunity to report the everyday life of those people in their restrictive confinement. The resulting series of articles, published in chapters for five days in a row, snatched a large number of readers, yielding to the author the deserved recognition from colleagues, competitors and the general public, which would come to nickname her as "the first reporter of Brazil". Before getting married and temporarily abandon her profession, Eugênia circulated by the newsroom of two other famous newspapers of that time, A Notícia and O País.

=== Marriage and political and cultural life ===
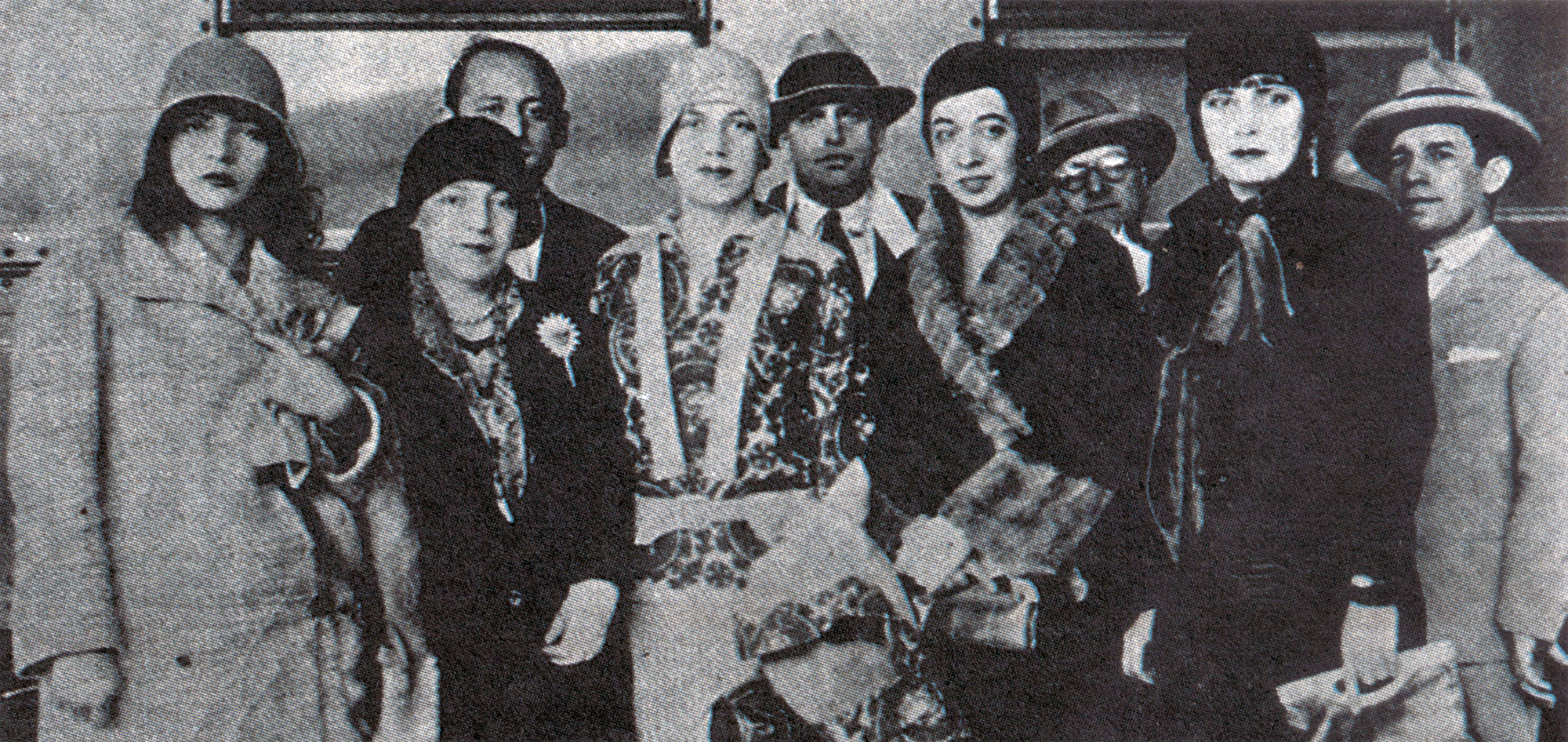
From left to right: Pagu, Elsie Lessa, Tarsila do Amaral, Anita Malfatti and Eugênia Álvaro Moreyra at the Modern Art Week of 1922.

At the height of her career as a street reporter, Eugênia met the poet Álvaro Moreyra, who attended the same intellectual and bohemian circles. In love, they got married in 1914. Eugênia then adopted her husband's name and surname, and left her journalistic career on hold to devote to her new family life. The couple had eight children, four of which survived infancy: Sandro Luciano, João Paulo, Álvaro Samuel and Rosa Marina. She participated in the Modern Art Week of 1922, and founded with him in 1927 the Teatro de Brinquedo (Toy Theatre Group), whose intent was to manifest modernist ideas. Between 1928 and 1932, she made several excursions to the countryside and outskirts of Rio de Janeiro, introducing the public to modern European authors.

With the fragmentation of the Brazilian modernist movement after the Revolution of 1930, Eugênia went on to defend along with Alvaro Moreyra, Pagú and Oswald de Andrade, leftist positions, actively participating in the Aliança Nacional Libertadora (National Liberation Alliance), consequently being persecuted by the Vargas government. Influenced by Carlos Lacerda, Eugênia and Alvaro affiliate themselves to the Communist Party of Brazil (PCB), and in May 1935 she joined the group of founders of the União Feminina do Brasil (Women's Union of Brazil), an organization promoted by women members or sympathizers of the PCB. Her house at that time had become a meeting place for bohemians and intellectuals, and among the many attendees were Di Cavalcanti, Vinicius de Morais, Carlos Drummond de Andrade, Graciliano Ramos and Jorge Amado.

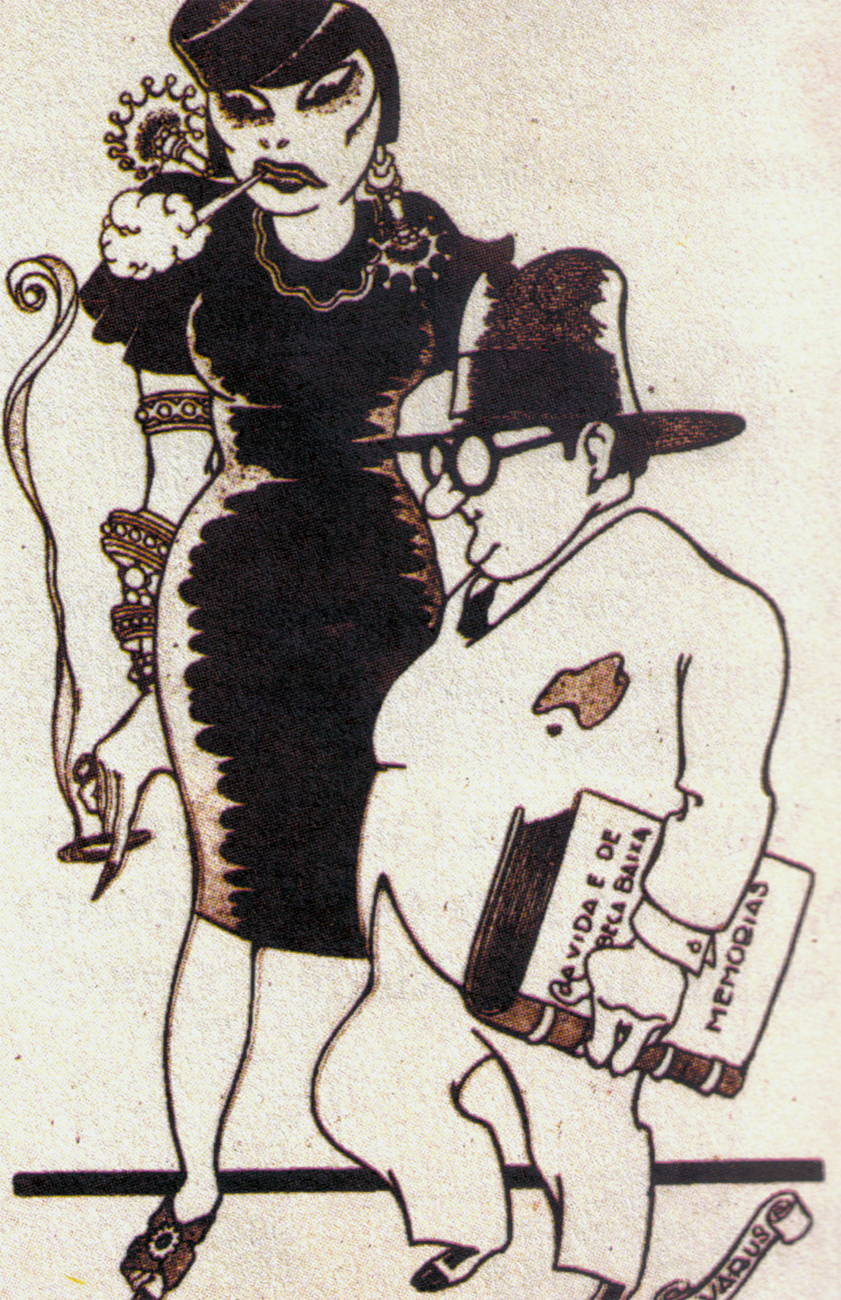
The Moreyra couple, in a caricature of Brazilian artist Alvarus (1920).

In November 1935, after the Communist Conspiracy movement, Eugênia was detained and accused of involvement with the PCB. She remained about four months in the House of Detention on Frei Caneca street, where she shared the cell no. 4 with communist militant Olga Benário Prestes, Maria Werneck de Castro, Nise da Silveira, Beatriz Bandeira, Armanda Álvaro Alberto and Eneida de Moraes. She was released for lack of evidence on the morning of February 1, 1936. She then returned to political activism, engaging herself, among other activities, in a campaign for the release of Anita Leocadia, Olga Benário's baby, who was born after her deportation to a concentration camp in Adolf Hitler's Nazi Germany. In 1937, Álvaro presented to the theater department commission of the Ministry of Education and Culture his plan for the organization of a "Brazilian Dramatic Company", which was approved. He and his wife then toured the states of Rio de Janeiro and Rio Grande do Sul, subsequently performing a three-month season at Teatro Regina, in Rio de Janeiro.

=== Unionist activity and death ===
Between 1936 and 1938, Eugênia was president of Casa dos Artista, the union of the theatrical class in São Paulo. Elected for a new term in February 1939, she was prevented from taking office by Filinto Müller, who filled to the Ministry of Labour and Employment a complaint that she was a "communist person mentioned at the Police Department of Security and Social Policy". The election was overruled by direct order of Minister Valdemar Falcão. She even ran for congresswoman in the general elections of 1945, but at the time no woman could be elected to represent women's interests during the drafting of the Brazilian Constitution of 1946.

On June 16, 1948, Eugênia was home in Rio playing cards when she felt sick. She died shortly after in her bedroom, next to her children, as a result of a stroke. She was then 50 years old.

== Legacy ==
In a statement published in the newspaper Correio da Manhã after Eugênia's death, the writer Oswald de Andrade said that "what is due to her one day will be calculated". In reality, however, is that over the years the important and disruptive activities of Eugênia in a hitherto male-dominated society, specially in places such as the political and unionist sectors, became increasingly underestimated, and like this she remains a character still out of the history books — remembered, if at all, only by her pioneering altruism. After Alvaro's death in 1964, a significant number of photographs and clippings from newspapers and magazines about his wife were found in his personnel files. The collection was partly used by him as a reference in the composition of the autobiographical book As Amargas, Não subsequently donated by his relatives to the Fundação Casa de Rui Barbosa (House of Rui Barbosa Foundation).

== Bibliography ==
- Moreyra, Álvaro. 2007. As amargas, não.... Biblioteca da Academia Brasileira de Letras. ISBN 9788574401126
- Almeida, Lara Monique de Oliveira. 2007. Eugênia Brandão: A Primeira Repórter do Brasil
- Santucci, Jane. 2005. Os pavilhões do Passeio Público: Theatro Casino e Casino Beira-Mar. Casa da Palavra. ISBN 9788587220998
- Sodré, Nelson Werneck. 1999. História da Imprensa no Brasil. 4ª edição. Rio de Janeiro. Mauad. ISBN 9788585756888
- Lobo, Eulália Maria Lahmeyer. 1994. Portugueses en Brasil en el siglo XX. Volumen 5 de Colección Portugal y el mundo, ilustrada. Ed. MAPFRE. ISBN 8471006162
- Gonçalves, Augusto de Freitas Lopes. 1982. Dicionário histórico e literário do teatro no Brasil. Volume 4. Livraria Editora Cátedra
