= Cláudia Jimenez =

Brazilian actress (1958–2022)

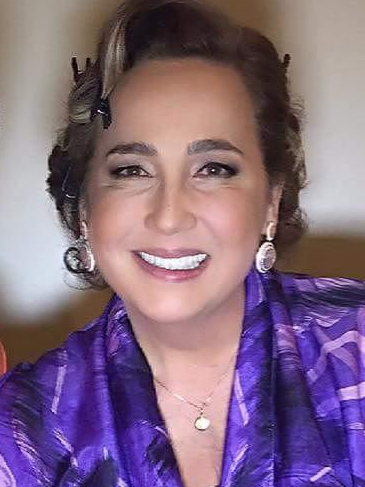
Jimenez in 2016

Cláudia Maria Patitucci Jimenez (18 November 1958 – 20 August 2022) was a Brazilian actress, comedienne and screenwriter. She started her career in 1979 in the TV show Malu Mulher, but it was from the 1980s onwards that she began to stand out, working with humour in shows such as Os Trapalhões, Viva O Gordo and Chico Anysio Show.

In the 1990s, she stood out in the film O Corpo, playing Bia, a character that won her Best Actress at the Brasilia Film Festival. In the same period, she had a prominent role in the humorous Escolinha do Professor Raimundo as Cacilda. Later, she joined the cast of Sai de Baixo to play Edileuza; as well, she gave life to the character Glorinha in Zorra Total. In 2004, she was the protagonist of Sitcom.br, a feature of Fantástico until she stood out in the TV show Sete Pecados, in which she received two nominations for the Contigo! Award 2008 in the categories of Best Supporting Actress and Best Romantic Couple.

== Biography ==
=== Education ===
Born in Rio de Janeiro on 18 November 1958, Jimenez graduated from a normal school with a kindergarten degree and studied amateur theatre at Tijuca Tênis Clube.

=== Career ===
In 1978, she made her professional theatre debut, playing the prostitute Mimi Bibelô in the first production of Ópera do Malandro, by Chico Buarque, alongside Ary Fontoura and Marieta Severo. Producer Maurício Shermann saw her in the play and invited her to go to TV Globo. Cláudia was invited to participate in the opening of the program Viva o Gordo and soon joined the cast of the program, where she remained for four years. Simultaneously, she also participated in the program Os Trapalhões. Her comic performance caught the attention of Chico Anysio, who invited her to act in several of his programs, such as Chico Anysio Show and Escolinha do Professor Raimundo. Alongside Chico, she played several characters, such as the nymphomaniac Pureza, the sadistic nurse Alda and the flirtatious student Dona Cacilda, a parody of the presenter Xuxa, with the catchphrase Beijinho-Beijinho Pau-Pau!.

=== Death ===
Jimenez died on 20 August 2022, at the age of 63.

== Selected filmography ==
Year	Title	Role	Notes
1983	Gabriela	Olga	
1988	The Story of Fausta		
1990	Escolinha do Professor Raimundo	Cacilda	
1991	O Corpo	Bia	
1996	Você Decide		
1996	Sai de Baixo	Edileuza	
1998	Torre de Babel	Bina Colombo	
2001	As Filhas da Mãe	Dagmar Cerqueira	
2002	Os Normais	Sara	
2005	América	Consuelo	
2007	Sete Pecados	Custódia	
2008	Negócio da China	Violante Gonçalves	
2011	Aquele Beijo	Mãe Iara	
2012	As Brasileiras	Augusta Ramil	
2013	Além do Horizonte	Zélia	
2016	Haja Coração	Lucrécia Abdala Varela	
