= Feminist Theory (journal) =

- Discipline: Gender studies
- Language: English
- Edited by: Stacy Gillis, Celia Roberts, Carolyn Pedwell, Sarah Kember

Publication details
- History: 2000–present
- Publisher: SAGE Publications
- Frequency: Triannually
- Impact factor: 1.268 (2015)

Standard abbreviations
- ISO 4: Fem. Theory

Indexing
- ISSN: 1464-7001 (print); 1741-2773 (web)
- LCCN: 00233878
- OCLC no.: 439137540

Links
- Journal homepage; Online access; Online archive

Feminist Theory is a peer-reviewed academic journal that covers the field of women's studies. The journal's editors-in-chief are Stacy Gillis (Newcastle University), Celia Roberts (Lancaster University), Carolyn Pedwell (Newcastle University), and Sarah Kember (Goldsmith's College). It was established in 2000 and is currently published by SAGE Publications.

== Abstracting and indexing ==
Feminist Theory is abstracted and indexed in Scopus and the Social Sciences Citation Index. According to the Journal Citation Reports, its 2015 impact factor is 1.268, ranking it 12th out of 40 journals in the category "Women's Studies".

== See also ==
- List of women's studies journals
