= Ópera do Malandro =

Brazilian musical play by Chico Buarque

- Written by: Chico Buarque
- Based on: The Beggar's Opera by John Gay; The Threepenny Opera by Bertolt Brecht and Kurt Weill

Premiere
- Directed by: Luiz Antônio Martinez Corrêa

Ópera do Malandro (transl. The Scoundrel's Opera) is a 1979 Brazilian musical play written by Chico Buarque and directed by Luiz Antônio Martinez Corrêa. It is inspired by John Gay’s The Beggar's Opera and Bertolt Brecht and Kurt Weill’s The Threepenny Opera. The play is a tribute to Paulo Pontes, who died in 1976.

== Synopsis and analysis ==
The play takes place in the 1940s.

Duran, a pimp, disguises himself as a successful salesman. Vitória is a madam who makes a living as a prostitute. Her daughter, Teresinha, falls in love with an upper-class citizen, Max Overseas, who works in international business and benefits from collusion with a pimp and the chief police officer, Chaves. The other characters are prostitutes, presented as saleswomen in a clothing store, and the transvestite Geni, who is frequently attacked with rocks and considered “useful” for such.

The overture, Geni e o Zepelim, tells about a transvestite who is a "whipping-post" for the neighborhood, a fact only told to the audience. When the captain of a zeppelin who intends to bombard the city accepts to change his mind if he has a one night stand with her, the citizens ask her to consent to his desires.

Ópera do Malandro is about persisting elements of Brazilian culture and black market activities, including gambling prohibition, prostitution and smuggling.

All of the songs are composed by Buarque, who harmonizes the music with the lyrics. The songs follow the pattern of rhymed and metrical verses, according to the intellectual tradition of the author's family.

== Technical staff (first performance) ==
Crew:

- General director: Luiz Antônio Martinez Corrêa
- Assistant to the general director: João Carlos Motta
- Scenography: Maurício Sette
- Scenography assistant: Rita Murtinho
- Musical director: John Neschling
- Assistant to the musical director: Paulo Sauer
- Arrangement: John Neschling, Paulo Sauer
- Interpretative vocal director: Glorinha Beutenmuller
- Corporal director: Fernando Pinto
- Lighting: Jorge Carvalho
- Script: Maurício Arraes

Cast - in order of appearance:

- The producer: Ary Fontoura
- The matriarch: Maria Alice Vergueiro
- João Alegre: Nadinho Da Ilha
- Duran: Ary Fontoura
- Vitória: Maria Alice Vergueiro
- Teresinha: Marieta Severo
- Max: Otávio Augusto
- Lúcia: Elba Ramalho
- Geni: Emiliano Queirós
- Barrabás: Ivens Godinho
- Johnny Walker: Vander De Castro
- Phillip Morris: Paschoal Villamboim
- Big Bem: Ivan De Almeida
- General Electric: Vicente Barcelos
- Dóris Pelanca: Ilva Nino
- Fichinha: Cidinha Milan
- Dorinha Tubão: Elza De Andrade
- Shirley Paquete: Neusa Borges
- Jussara Pé De Anjo: Maria Alves
- Mimi Bibelô: Cláudia Jimenez

== Tracklist ==
- O malandro (Mack the Knife) (Bertolt Brecht, Kurt Weill)
- Hino de Duran (Chico Buarque)
- Viver de amor (Buarque)
- Uma canção desnaturada (Buarque)
- Tango do Covil (Buarque)
- Dez anos (Buarque)
- O casamento dos pequenos burgueses (Buarque)
- Teresinha (Buarque)
- Homenagem ao malandro (Buarque)
- Folhetim (Buarque)
- Ai, se eles me pegam agora (Buarque)
- O meu amor (Buarque)
- Se eu fosse o teu patrão (Buarque)
- Geni e o Zepelim (Buarque)
- Pedaço de mim (Buarque)
- Ópera do Malandro (Buarque, based on excerpts from Rigoletto by Verdi, Carmen by Bizet, Aida by Verdi, La Traviata by Verdi, and Taunhauser by Wagner)
- O malandro nº 2 (Mack the Knife) (Buarque)

== Reception ==
Reviews of the play were positive, with critics complimenting the veracity of its portrayal of Brazilian society in the mid-20th century.

== See also ==
- Ópera do Malandro (movie) (in Portuguese)
- Ópera do Malandro (opera soundtrack) (in Portuguese)
