= Richard Miskolci =

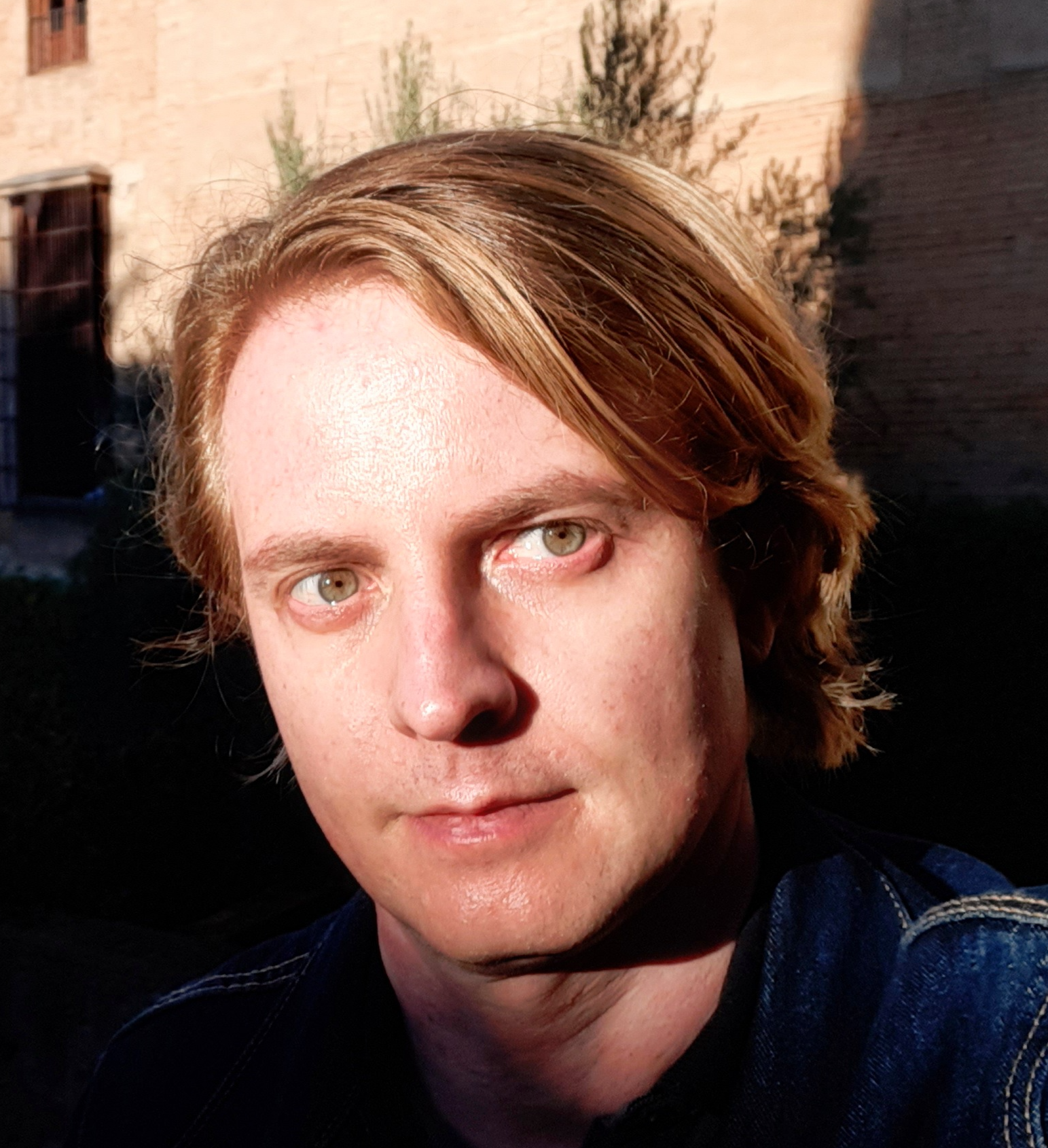
- Richard Miskolci in 2021
- Education: University of Chicago; University of São Paulo (Ph.D)
- Occupation: Sociologist
- Employer: Federal University of São Paulo
- Title: Full Professor of Sociology

Richard Miskolci is a Brazilian sociologist. He is Full Professor of Sociology at UNIFESP (Federal University of São Paulo) (Federal University of São Paulo), Brazil, a researcher of CNPq (National Council for Scientific and Technological Development), and President of the Working Group Digital Sociology at the International Sociological Association (ISA).

== Career ==
Graduated in Economics, Miskolci turned to Sociology in his postgraduate studies. His education was shaped by Critical Theory, the articulation between sociology, psychoanalysis, and history. He has researched in Germany and was a Student-at-large in the humanities at the University of Chicago before receiving his PhD in Sociology from University of São Paulo (2001).

He taught at the Federal University of São Carlos (UFSCar) between 2004 and 2018, where he established himself as one of the main national references in digital sociology and studies on differences. He co-organized, with Júlio Assis Simões, the compilation Sexualidades Disparatadas (2007), the first on queer studies published in Brazil, awarded the Citizenship Prize in Respect for Diversity (2008). In this line of studies, his work was characterized by a critical perspective on identity politics, emphasizing the role of historical and cultural structures in shaping individual desires and self-understandings.

In Digital Sociology, he supervised and developed research on the impacts of the use of information and communication technologies (ICTs) on social relations, from intimate to political ones. In 2016, he organized the first Brazilian dossier in this investigative line and, in 2017, founded the Digital Sociology Working Group of the Brazilian Sociological Society, later promoted to a Research Committee under his coordination.

Since 2018, he has been a professor at the Federal University of São Paulo (UNIFESP), where he works in the Graduate Program in Public Health, serves as the program’s deputy coordinator, and is a member of its communications committee. He has conducted research and supervised work on health misinformation and related issues involving the use of communication and information technologies.

== Intellectual production ==
As a researcher, Miskolci initially stood out for empirical investigations into the role of emotions in collective life, in particular the ghosts and fears shaping social conflicts. In Thomas Mann, o Artista Mestiço (2003), he explored fears of racial and sexual degeneration shaping the contradictions and conflicts between the artist and bourgeois society. In O Desejo da Nação: masculinidade e branquitude no Brasil de fins do XIX (2012), he analyzed how Brazilian elites formulated a national project marked by ideals of whiteness and masculinity in the context of the First Republic.

From the 2010s onwards, Miskolci fully dedicated himself to studying the uses of information and communication technologies (ICTs) and their impact on social relations. He organized the first Brazilian collection on digital sociology (2016) and published Desejos Digitais: uma análise sociológica da busca por parceiros on-line (2017), in which he examines the dynamics of sociability and desire mediated by digital platforms.

In Batalhas Morais: política identitária na esfera pública técnico-midiatizada (2021), Miskolci critically analyzes the moral framing that shapes both identity politics and its opponents in Brazilian society, highlighting its impacts on the erosion of democratic debate.

In subsequent years, he took part in international projects on political polarization in Latin America and published a chapter on political conflict in Brazil in the book La Era del Hartazgo (2025). He also conducted comparative research on misinformation during the COVID-19 pandemic in Brazil and Spain, as a Senior Visiting Professor at the Complutense University of Madrid.

== Recent Work ==
His current research focuses on misinformation understood as an informational dispute in the new media ecology, dominated by social networks and messaging apps. He continues to coordinate the Digital Sociology Committee of the Brazilian Sociological Society (SBS) and, in 2025, was elected president of the ISA Working Group on Digital Sociology, consolidating his international leadership in the field.

== Publication list ==
- Miskolci, Richard. Thomas Mann, o Artista Mestiço. São Paulo: Annablume/FAPESP, 2003.
- _________________. (editor) Normalidade, Desvio, Differenças In: Teoria & Pesquisa. São Carlos: PPGCS, 2005.
- Miskolci, Richard. O desejo da nação: masculinidade e branquitude no Brasil de fins do XIX. São Paulo: Annablume/FAPESP, 2012.
- _________________. Scavone, Lucila; Alvarez, M. C. (editors) O Legado de Foucault. São Paulo: Editora Unesp/FAPESP, 2006.
- _________________. Simões, Júlio Assis. (editors) "Sexualidades Disparatadas" In: Cadernos Pagu Campinas: Pagu-UNICAMP, 2007.
- Miskolci, Richard. (editor) "Marcas da Diferença no Ensino Escolar". São Carlos: EdUFSCar, 2010.
- Miskolci, Richard & Pelúcio, Larissa. Discursos fora da ordem: sexualidades, saberes e direitos. São Paulo: FAPESP/Annablume, 2012.
- Miskolci, Richard. Teoria Queer: um aprendizado pelas diferenças. Belo Horizonte: Autêntica, 2012.
- Miskolci, Richard & Leite Júnior, Jorge. Diferenças na Educação: outros aprendizados. São Carlos: Edufscar, 2014.
- Miskolci, Richard (June 2015). "'Discreet and out of the gay scene' - notes on contemporary sexual visibility". Cadernos Pagu (44): 61–90. doi:10.1590/1809-4449201500440061.
- "Dossiê Sociologia Digital organizado por Richard Miskolci" [Digital Sociology Dossier organized by Richard Miskolci]. Contemporânea (in Portuguese).
- Miskolci, Richard. Desejos Digitais: uma análise sociológica da busca por parceiros online. Belo Horizonte: Autêntica, 2017.
- Miskolci, Richard (17 December 2019). "The Moral Crusade on 'Gender Ideology': notes on conservative political alliances in Latin America". Sociologies in Dialogue. 4 (2): 45–59. doi:10.20336/sid.v4i2.99 (inactive 12 July 2025). Archived from the original on 1 June 2020.
- Machado, Jorge; Miskolci, Richard (December 2019). "Das Jornadas de junho à cruzada moral: o papel das redes sociais na polarização política brasileira" [From the June demonstrations to the moral crusade: the role of social media networks in political polarization]. Sociologia & Antropologia (in Spanish). 9 (3): 945–970. doi:10.1590/2238-38752019v9310.
- Miskolci, Richard. Batalhas morais: política identitária na esfera pública técnico-midiatizada. Belo Horizonte: Autêntica, 2021.
- Miskolci, Richard. Beyond science denialism: disinformation during the Covid-19 pandemic. Sociologias, v.25, 2023.https://doi.org/10.1590/18070337-123090EN
- Miskolci, Richard & Balieiro, Fernando F. The Moralization of Politics in Brazil. International Sociology, v.38, n.4, 2023. https://doi.org/10.1177/02685809231180879
- Kessler, Gabriel; Miskolci, Richard; Vommaro, Gabriel. The Ideology of Bolsonaro Voters. Sociologia & Antropologia, v.14, n.1, 2024. https://doi.org/10.1590/2238-38752024V14110
