= Onda Nova =

- Directed by: Ícaro (Francisco C) Martins; José Antonio Garcia
- Written by: Ícaro (Francisco C) Martins; José Antonio Garcia
- Produced by: Adone Fragano; José Augusto Pereira de Queiroz
- Starring: Carla Camurati; Cristina Mutarelli
- Cinematography: Antonio Meliande
- Edited by: Eder Mazini
- Music by: Laura Finochiaro; Cristina Santeiro; Luiz Lopes
- Production company: Olympus Filmes
- Release date: 1983
- Running time: 103 minutes
- Country: Brazil
- Language: Portuguese

Onda Nova (English: New Wave) is a 1983 Brazilian film directed by Ícaro (Francisco C) Martins and José Antonio Garcia. It is an "erotic and anarchic comedy" that portrays a women's soccer team formed in the midst of the Brazilian military dictatorship—in the first year the sport was permitted after 40 years of prohibition. The film was banned before its release and restored in 4K in 2024.

== Plot ==
The film Onda Nova brings together the stories of the young players of the Gayvotas Futebol Clube, a newly-formed women's soccer team in Brazil. Until 1979 amid the military dictatorship, women's football was banned in Brazil, with women only being permitted to form official teams again in 1983, when the film was produced. It follows the players through struggles with the prejudices of conservative society, as well as their experiences navigating personal and family issues while preparing for a symbolic international match. The film was supported by well-known players, and it features cameos from such players as Walter Casagrande, Pita and Wladimir who were involved in the Brazilian struggle for democracy.

== Cast ==
- Carla Camurati as Rita
- Cristina Mutarelli as Lili
- Tânia Alves as Helena
- Regina Casé as Rubi
- Pita as a footballer
- Vera Zimmermann as Vera
- Caetano Veloso as a singer
- Wladimir as a footballer
- Osmar Santos as a sports commentator
- Walter Casagrande as a footballer
- Sérgio Hingst as President of the Football Club
- Edla Van Steen

== Analysis ==
Production company Olympus Filmes notes that, while the film is comedic, it does not fall under the genre of contemporary pornochanchadas films combining pornography and light comedy. This is because "it is a movie in which desire takes center stage, defining and driving the characters and the narrative ... by placing desire as an affirmation of identity and life, Onda Nova is the very negation of the dictatorship in force at the time".

== Release and reception ==
The film was presented at the 7th São Paulo International Film Festival in 1983. The military regime banned the film soon after, thus the film was only able to be released almost one year later. Rather than being censored for one scene or another, the entire film was banned on the alleged grounds of being "amoral" as a whole.

Despite initially being banned, Onda Nova became "cult" among other reasons due to its anti-sexist and inclusive vision and is considered a forerunner of the inclusion of queer identities in Brazilian cinema. The film was selected for the “Histoire(s) du Cinéma” section of the 77th edition of the renowned Locarno Film Festival in 2024, for which the film was restored in 4K.

Onda Nova currently has a 5.5/10 on IMDB.
