= Indian Journal of Gender Studies =

- Discipline: Gender studies
- Language: English
- Edited by: Malavika Karlekar; Leela Kasturi

Publication details
- History: 1994–present
- Publisher: Sage Publications on behalf of the Indian Council of Social Science Research (India)
- Frequency: Triannual
- Impact factor: 0.5 (2023)

Standard abbreviations
- ISO 4: Indian J. Gend. Stud.

Indexing
- CODEN: IJGSF4
- ISSN: 0971-5215 (print); 0973-0672 (web)
- LCCN: 94904841
- OCLC no.: 60628369

Links
- Journal homepage; Online access; Online archive

The Indian Journal of Gender Studies is a triannual peer-reviewed academic journal with a focus on a holistic understanding of gender. The editors-in-chief are Malavika Karlekar and Leela Kasturi (Indian Council of Social Science Research). The journal is published thrice a year by Sage on behalf of the Indian Council of Social Science Research.

== Abstracting and indexing ==
The journal is abstracted and indexed in:

- EBSCOhost
- EconLit
- Indian Citation Index
- International Bibliography of the Social Sciences
- ProQuest databases
- Research Papers in Economics
- Scopus
- Social Sciences Citation Index

According to the Journal Citation Reports, the journal has a 2023 impact factor of 0.5.

== See also ==
- List of women's studies journals
