= Journal of Women's History =

- Discipline: Gender studies, history, women's studies
- Language: English
- Edited by: Sandie Holguín; Jennifer J. Davis

Publication details
- History: 1989-present
- Publisher: Johns Hopkins University Press (United States)
- Frequency: Quarterly
- Impact factor: 0.06 (2023)

Standard abbreviations
- ISO 4: J. Women's Hist.

Indexing
- ISSN: 1042-7961 (print); 1527-2036 (web)
- LCCN: 89656516
- OCLC no.: 19219902

Links
- Journal homepage; Online access at Project MUSE

The Journal of Women's History is a quarterly peer-reviewed academic journal established in 1989 covering women's history. It explores multiple perspectives of feminism rather than promoting a single unifying form. Articles published in this journal showcase the dynamic international field of women's history. It is published by the Johns Hopkins University Press. The editors-in-chief from June 2020 are Sandie Holguín and Jennifer J. Davis (University of Oklahoma).

According to the Journal Citation Reports, the journal has a 2023 impact factor of 0.06, ranking it 47th out of 66 journals in the category "Women's Studies".

== See also ==
- List of women's studies journals
