= The Hellbenders =

1967 film directed by Sergio Corbucci

- Italian film poster
- Directed by: Sergio Corbucci
- Screenplay by: Albert Band; Ugo Liberatore; José Gutiérrez Maesso
- Story by: Virgil C. Gerlach
- Produced by: Albert Band
- Starring: Joseph Cotten; Norma Bengell; Julián Mateos; Gino Pernice; Ángel Aranda
- Cinematography: Enzo Barboni
- Edited by: Nino Baragli; Alberto Gallitti
- Music by: Ennio Morricone
- Production companies: Alba Cinematografica; Tecisa Film
- Release dates: February 1967 (Italy); November 1967 (Spain)
- Running time: 88 minutes
- Countries: Italy; Spain

The Hellbenders (Italian: I crudeli, lit. 'The Cruel Ones') is a 1967 Spaghetti Western film directed by Sergio Corbucci and starring Joseph Cotten, Norma Bengell, Julián Mateos, Gino Pernice and Ángel Aranda.

== Plot ==
In 1865, Colonel Jonas is a fanatical and unrepentant Confederate who led a regiment called the Hellbenders in the recently ended Civil War. He is determined to reorganize the Confederate Army and defeat the Union. With his sons Ben, greedy Nat, and rapist Jeff, he massacres Union soldiers transporting a consignment of banknotes and conceals the loot in a coffin supposedly belonging to a deceased Confederate officer, Captain Ambrose Allen, who was killed in the Battle of Nashville.

A drunken prostitute, Kitty, pretends to be the officer's widow. When Kitty is killed attempting a double-cross, Ben persuades Claire, a combination saloon hostess and professional gambler, to take Kitty's place—and then they fall in love. They consummate their love while Jonas is in a gunfight with a local bounty hunter.

The cool Claire proves her worth when feigning grief to a sheriff's posse who stop the wagon and wish to search the coffin suspecting the party may have been responsible for the theft and massacre. The party has another close shave when they stop in a town where the local minister who knew the late Captain Allen forces the party to stay for a memorial service where the town can pay their respects. Tension arises when the minister produces a man, Sergeant Tolt, who knew Allen's wife as well, but it turns out that he is blind (and so cannot identify Claire as a fraud). Tolt mentions possessing photographs of Captain Allen and his wife, so Jonas decides that Tolt must be secretly murdered and the photographs stolen.

Later the party is attacked by Mexican bandidos but is rescued by the U.S. cavalry who capture several of the bandidos. Heeding Claire's wishes, the soldiers escort the wagon to the fort where Captain Allen was a former commander.

Claire, resentful of Jonas' fanaticism, arranges for the coffin to be buried in 'her' husband's fort. Jonas orders his sons to sneak back into the Union fort, dig up the coffin, and return the money to the wagon; in the meantime, he whips Claire and makes her stay outside of the cave where the group takes shelter in the storm, leading Claire to become gravely ill from pneumonia.

The group moves on—but their horses are killed by what appears to be a mad beggar but is a thief who wishes to rob them. After killing the thief they later fall afoul of Indians who are thought to be friendly and willing to selling horses to the Hellbenders. The chief demands that Jeff (who raped and murdered his daughter with a bayonet when he should have been buying horses) be handed over to him. Ben denounces his family's fanaticism and offers the Indians all the money in the coffin, only to be caught in the crossfire between his arguing brothers, who shoot each other over the money; satisfied, the Indians ride away. The mortally wounded Jonas discovers that his sons dug up the wrong coffin that contains the remains of Pedro the head bandido, who promised Jonas they would meet again. As Ben and Claire watch on, Jonas crawls away and dies by the edge of the river, as the flag of the Hellbenders regiment sinks to the bottom of the river.

== Cast ==
- Joseph Cotten as Colonel Jonas
- Norma Bengell as Claire
- Julián Mateos as Ben
- Gino Pernice as Jeff
- Ángel Aranda as Nat
- Claudio Gora as Reverend Pierce
- María Martín as Kitty
- Aldo Sambrell as Pedro
- Al Mulock as The Beggar
- Enio Girolami as Lieutenant Soublette
- Julio Peña as Sergeant Tolt
- José Nieto as The Sheriff
- Claudio Scarchilli as Indian Chief
- Álvaro de Luna as Bixby
- Rafael Vaquero as Tyler
- Giovanni Ivan Scratuglia as Gambler in Denton Saloon
- Gene Collins as Union Soldier counting money
- William Conroy as Union Soldier
- Gonzalo de Esquiroz
- Martín Díaz as Search Party Lieutenant
- Rocco Lerro as Denton Saloon Brawler
- Mimmo Poli as Man in Saloon
- Benito Stefanelli as Slim the Gambler

== Release ==
The Hellbenders was released in Italy in February 1967. It was released in Spain in November 1967.

== Reception ==
In a contemporary review, Stuart Byron of Variety felt the film was not superior to the majority of other European Western films due to "indifferent direction, uneven color quality, and heavy-handed acting" and that Joseph Cotten gave "one of his weakest performances of his career." The Monthly Film Bulletin stated the film was "quite efficiently made but with the usual quota of gratuitous violence" and that the film's script was "more ingenious than most"
