= Eternamente Pagú =

1988 film directed by Norma Bengell

- Theatrical release poster
- Directed by: Norma Bengell
- Written by: Norma Bengell; Márcia de Almeida; Geraldo Carneiro
- Produced by: Jayme Del Cueto; Agostinho Janequine
- Starring: Carla Camurati
- Cinematography: Antônio Luiz Mendes Soares
- Edited by: Dominique Paris
- Music by: Turibio Santos; Roberto Gnattali
- Production companies: Flai Cinematográfica; Sky Light Cinema; Maksoud Plaza; Embrafilme
- Distributed by: Embrafilme
- Release date: May 12, 1988
- Running time: 100 minutes
- Country: Brazil
- Language: Portuguese

Eternamente Pagú is a 1988 biopic about Patrícia Galvão, directed by Norma Bengell and starring Carla Camurati.

== Plot ==
Eternamente Pagú is a biographical film about Patrícia Galvão, best known as Pagu, a Brazilian political, literary and artistic activist. An important figure of the Brazilian Modernism, Pagu was also a militant for the Brazilian Communist Party after she married writer Oswald de Andrade. She broke up with Andrade and, as a journalist was arrested by the Dictatorship of Getúlio Vargas. After she left prison, she abandoned Communism in favor of Trotskyist Socialism, married Geraldo Ferraz, and started a career as theatre director.

== Cast ==
- Carla Camurati as Patrícia "Pagu" Galvão
- Antônio Fagundes as Oswald de Andrade
- Esther Góes as Tarsila do Amaral
- Nina de Pádua as Sideria
- Otávio Augusto as Geraldo Ferraz
- Paulo Villaça as Pagu's father
- Norma Bengell as Elsie Houston
- Antonio Pitanga
- Breno Moroni
- Kito Junqueira
- Maria Sílvia
- Suzana Faini
- Beth Goulart
- Marcelo Picchi
- Carlos Gregório
- Eduardo Lago
- Ariel Coelho

== Reception ==
At the 16th Festival de Gramado, it received the Best Actress Award (Camurati) and the Best Adapted Score Award.
