= Tânia Alves =

Brazilian actress, dancer, singer and businesswoman

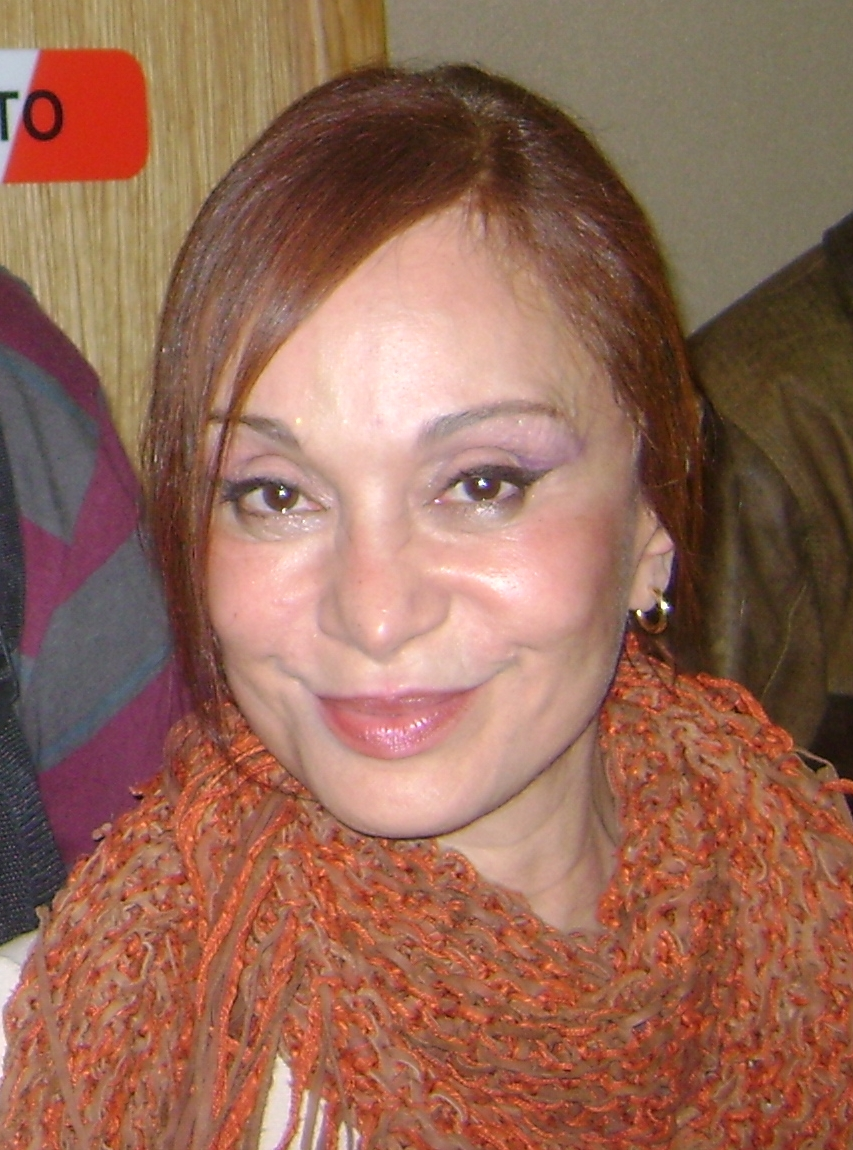
- Tânia Alves in October 2011
- Born: Tânia Maria Rego Alves; September 12, 1953 (age 72); Bonito de Santa Fé, Brazil
- Occupations: Actress; dancer; singer; businesswoman
- Children: 2

Tânia Maria Rego Alves (born September 12, 1953 in Bonito de Santa Fé) is a Brazilian actress, dancer, singer and businesswoman.

Her most recent work was the telenovela Araguaia, Walther Negrão, Rede Globo.

She also acts as an entrepreneur since 1999 and is the mother of actress Gabriela Alves, with whom he shares the administration of a spa in Nova Friburgo.

== Career ==
=== In television ===
- 1981 – Morte e Vida Severina – dam
- 1982 – Estúdio A... Gildo
- 1982 – Lampião e Maria Bonita – Maria Bonita
- 1983 – Bandidos da Falange – Glória
- 1985 – Tenda dos Milagres – Ana Mercedes
- 1985 – Ti Ti Ti – Clotilde
- 1990 – Pantanal – Filó
- 1992 – Pedra sobre Pedra – Lola
- 1993 – Você Decide (episode: Chofer de Táxi)
- 1995 – Tocaia Grande – Julia Saruê
- 1997 – Mandacaru – Severina Dantas
- 1998 – Brida – Mercedes
- 2000 – Marcas da Paixão – Zefinha
- 2001 – A Grande Família (episode: A Desquitada da Freguesia) – Terezinha
- 2001 – O Clone – Norma
- 2005 – Essas Mulheres – Firmina Mascarenhas
- 2007 – Amazônia, de Galvez a Chico Mendes – Dos Anjos
- 2010 – Araguaia – Pérola
- 2011 – Laços de Sangue

=== At the movies ===
- 1976 – Trem Fantasma
- 1977 – Morte e Vida Severina
- 1977 – Emanuelle Tropical
- 1979 – Bachianas Brasileiras: Meu Nome É Villa-Lobos
- 1979 – Loucuras, o Bumbum de Ouro
- 1981 – O Olho Mágico do Amor – Penélope
- 1982 – Cabaret Mineiro
- 1983 – Onda Nova - Helena
- 1983 – O Cangaceiro Trapalhão – Maria Bonita
- 1983 – Parahyba Mulher Macho – Anayde Beiriz
- 1983 – O Mágico e o Delegado – Paloma
- 1984 – Sole nudo – Regina
- 1985 – Ópera do Malandro
- 1990 – Lambada
- 1991 – A República dos Anjos
- 1998 – A Hora Mágica – Lília Cantarelli
