= Ewha Womans University Press =

Korean book publisher

- Parent company: Ewha Womans University
- Status: Active
- Founded: 1949
- Country of origin: South Korea
- Headquarters location: Seoul
- Nonfiction topics: Various
- Official website: EUP official website (in Korean); (in English)

Ewha Womans University Press (Korean: 이화여자대학교출판부) is a book publisher founded in 1949.

== History ==
The Ewha Womans University Press (EUP), the nation's first university press, was founded in 1949. The EUP's mission has been the advancement of academic communities and enlightenment of Korean society by publishing scholarly writings of Korean professors and books for university students, and translating and publishing prominent writings by foreign scholars.

The EUP has firmly established itself as Korea's most prestigious university press in terms of both scope and quality of publications. So far EUP has published more than 1,200 titles, of which 600 are currently available at bookstore across Korea.

In order to contribute to maintaining and enhancing the quality of academic publishing, EUP is a member of the following Korean and international publishers organizations:

- Association of Korean University Presses.
- Korean Publishers Association.
- International Association of Scholarly Publishers.

Although associated with the university, EUP operates independently in a regulatory context established by the Ministry of Culture and Tourism.
