= Women & Health =

- Discipline: Women's health
- Language: English
- Edited by: Ellen B. Gold

Publication details
- History: 1976–present
- Publisher: Taylor & Francis
- Frequency: 8/year
- Impact factor: 1.377 (2015)

Standard abbreviations
- ISO 4: Women Health

Indexing
- CODEN: WOHEDI
- ISSN: 0363-0242 (print); 1541-0331 (web)
- LCCN: 76648355
- OCLC no.: 02337206

Links
- Journal homepage; Online access; Online archive

Women & Health is a peer-reviewed healthcare journal established in 1976. It covers research in the field of women's health. The editor-in-chief is Ellen B. Gold (University of California, Davis).

According to the Journal Citation Reports, the journal has a 2015 impact factor of 1.377, ranking it 9th out of 40 journals in the category "Women's Studies" and 86th in the category "Public, Environmental & Occupational Health".

== See also ==
- List of women's studies journals
