= Korean Publishers Association =

Workers' association in South Korea

Korean Publishers Association 대한출판문화협회
- Type: Association
- Industry: Printing and distribution of literature
- Founded: 1947
- Headquarters: 105-2, Sagan-Dong, Jongno-Gu, Seoul,110-190, Korea
- Key people: Noh Kyung-tae
- Website: http://eng.kpa21.or.kr/main/index.htm

The Korean Publishers Association has a membership of 620 publishers in Korea and is the main voice of the nation's publishing industry and organizes the Seoul International Book Fair as well as Korean collective stands in the various international book fairs including the 2014 London Book Fair. It also publishes the "Korean Publishing Journal" and "Korean Publication Yearbook".

== Work ==
The KPA organizes the five-day Seoul International Book Fair, which celebrates its 20th anniversary on June 18 to coincide with the opening. Aside from raising awareness about the importance of reading among Koreans and promoting the Korean publishing industry to the world, the fair aims to facilitate the international book trade. Last year, over 25 countries, 610 exhibitors and 129,210 visitors attended the fair.

== History ==
June 2006 Official inauguration of the Organization Committee of the 2008 IPA Publisher Congress, Seoul. Opening of the Books from Korea website (www.koreabooks.net)
The 12th Seoul International Book Fair
May 2006 Na Choon-ho renewed his term as Presidency of the Asian Pacific Publishers Association
April 2006 Formation of the Organizing Committee and the executive committee of the 2008 IPA Publishers Congress, Seoul
November 2005 Forum on the prospectus of the foundation of the Korea Publishing Council was opened
October 2005 South Korea became the Guest of Honour at the 2005 Frankfurt Book Fair
June 2005 The 11th Seoul International Book Fair
February 2005 Korea, the Guest of Honour at the 2005 Taipei International Book Fair. Park Maeng-ho elected as the 45th President of the Korean Publishers Association
October 2004 Launch of the Korean Publishing Culture Awards
June 2004 Formal announcement of the 2008 IPA Congress to be held in Seoul, Korea
The 10th Seoul International Book Fair
March 2004 Korea, the Guest of Honour at the 2004 Bangkok International Book Fair
October 2003 Official inauguration of the Korean Organizing Committee for the Guest of Honour at the 2005 Frankfurt Book Fair
February 2003 Monthly magazine Publishing Journal was re-launched
Enactment of the Publishing and Printing Industry Promotion Act”
August 26, 2002 Promulgation of the “Publishing and Printing Industry Promotion Act”
October 2001 Became a member of the executive committee of the International Publishers Association
May 30, 2001 Hosted the Annual General Meeting of the Asian Pacific Publishers Association
January 2001 Launch of the Modernization of the Book Distribution System (three-year project)
August 2000 Mr. NA, Choon-ho elected as the president of the Asian Pacific Publishers Association
June 2000 Establishment of the Korea Reprographic & Translation Rights Center
June 25, 1999 Launch of the Homepage of the Korean Publishers Association at www.kpa21.or.kr
October 1999: "Books from Korea" published
September 1998: "50 Years of History of the Korean Publishers Association"published
May 17, 1995: Launch of the Seoul International Book Fair
January 26, 1994: Became a member of the Asian Pacific Publishers Association
August 25, 1992: 1993 designated as the Book of the Year
October 11, 1987 designated as National Book Day
December 1987: 40 Years History of the Korean Publishers Association was published
June 1984: Launch of The Selection of This Month's Books for Youth
February 1983: Launch of The Korea Science & Technology Book Awards
March 1980: Launch of The Korea Children's Book Awards
June 1975: Establishment of the Publishing Culture Hall
January 1962: KPA commissioned as an agency for the legal deposit of books
April 1957: Became a member of the International Publishers Association
March 26, 1952: KPA approved as a corporate juridical person by the Government
February 1948: Launch of the monthly magazine Chulpan-Munhwa (Publishing Culture)
March 15, 1947: Foundation of the Korean Publishers Association
