= Plínio Marcos =

Brazilian writer & actor (1935–1999)

- Plínio Marcos de Barros
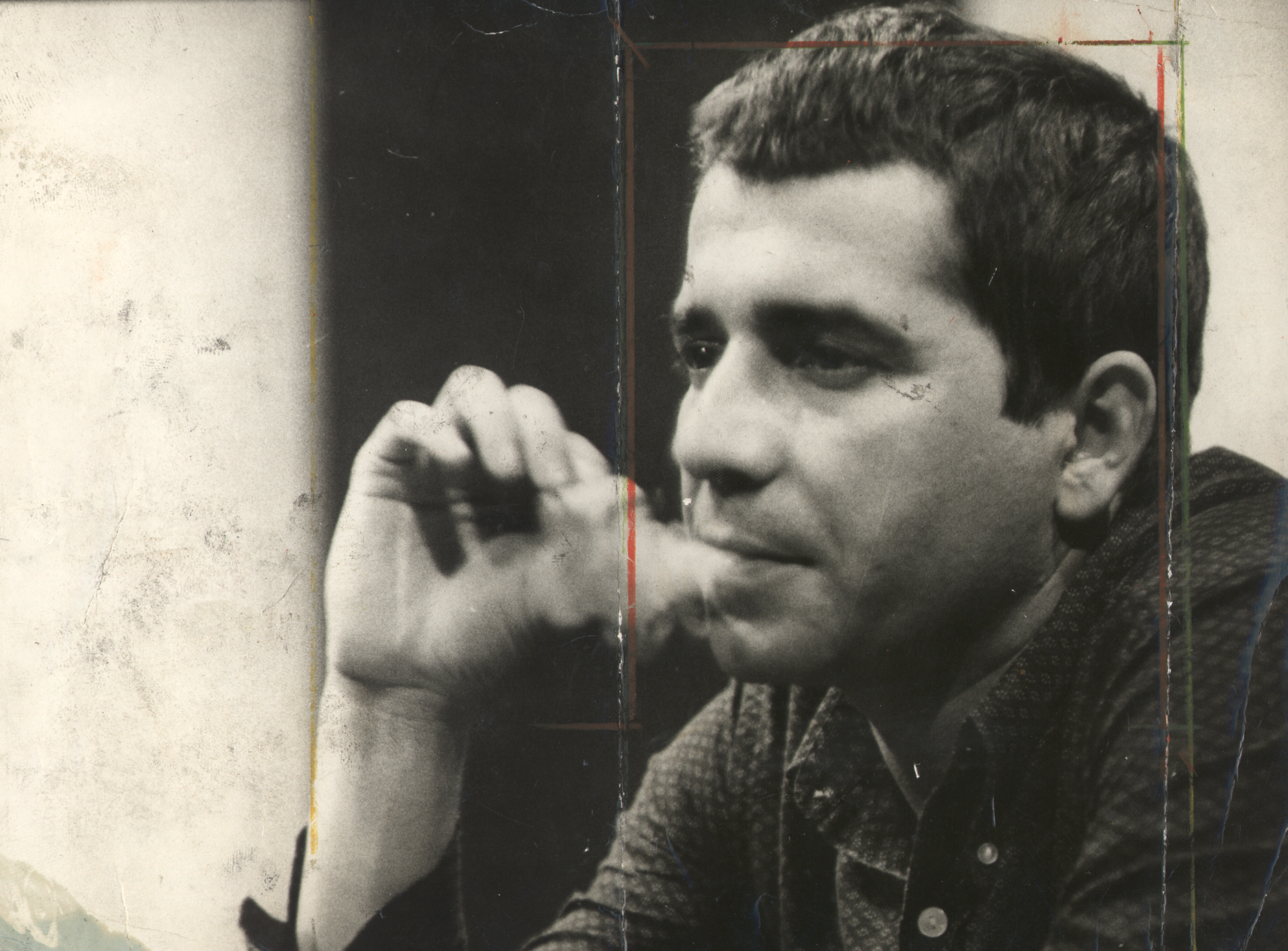
- Marcos in 1970
- Born: September 29, 1935; Santos, São Paulo, Brazil
- Died: November 19, 1999 (aged 64); São Paulo
- Occupations: Actor, journalist, playwright

Plínio Marcos de Barros (29 September 1935 — 19 November 1999) was a Brazilian writer, actor, journalist and playwright, author of several stage plays adapted into film. Called a "Poète maudit" by some, his work features the life and struggles of underground characters, touching themes such as violence, prostitution and homosexuality, and was censored by the military government.

== Early life ==
Marcos was born in 1935, in Santos, into a poor family. He finished only the primary school before dropping out. Marcos worked as coppersmith, served the Brazilian Air Force and played football for Portuguesa Santista, but he found his way into acting working as a circus clown when he was 17 years old. He also acted in the radio and television, in Santos.

In 1958, influenced by the writer and journalist Pagu, he got into a Santos amateur theater company. That same year, impressed by the true story of a young man gang-raped in prison, he wrote his first play, Barrela. Because of its crude language, the play was prohibited from being staged for 21 years.

In 1960, at the age of 25, he went to São Paulo, where he initially worked as a street vendor. Later, he worked in theater, as an actor (appearing in the TV Tupi series O Falcão Negro), administrator and handyman, in theater companies like Arena, Cacilda Becker and Nydia Lycia. From 1963, he produced texts for the TV Tupi show TV de Vanguarda, where he also worked as a technician. In 1964, year of the military coup, he made the script for the show Nossa gente, Nossa Música. In 1965, he managed to stage Reportagem de um tempo mau, a collage of texts by several authors, and that was only one day in the theaters.

In 1968, he participated as an actor in the telenovela Beto Rockfeller, as the driver Vitório. He reprised that role in the movies and also in the 1973 telenovela, A Volta de Beto Rockfeller, with less success. Still in the cinema, during the movement of the cinema marginal, the director Braz Chediak adapted two of its plays, Navalha na Carne (1969) and Dois Perdidos Numa Noite Suja (1970), both with the actor Emiliano Queiroz. In the 1970s, Plinio Marcos returned to the stage, getting himself to sell tickets at the theaters entrance. At the end of the play, he would take the stage and chat personally with the audience.

Marcos also wrote for newspapers such as Folha de S. Paulo, Última Hora and O Pasquim.

== Death ==
Marcos died on 19 November 1999, after suffering two strokes and having the left side of his body paralyzed. His body was cremated and the ashes were scattered to the ocean in Santos.

== Personal life ==
Marcos was married to the actress Walderez de Barros, with whom he had three children, and with the journalist Vera Artaxo.

== Works ==
=== Adult plays ===
- Barrela, 1958
- Os fantoches, 1960
- Jornada de um imbecil até o entendimento (1ª version)
- Enquanto os navios atracam, 1963
- Quando as máquinas param (1ª version)
- Chapéu sobre paralelepípedo para alguém chutar (2ª version of Os fantoches)
- Reportagem de um tempo mau, 1965
- Dois perdidos numa noite suja, 1966
- Dia virá (1ª version of Jesus-homem), 1967
- Navalha na carne, 1967
- Quando as máquinas param (2ª version of Enquanto os navios atracam), 1963
- Homens de papel, 1968
- Jornada de um imbecil até o entendimento (3ª version of Os fantoches)
- O abajur lilás, 1969
- Oração de um pé-de-chinelo, 1969
- Balbina de Iansã (musical), 1970
- Feira livre (opereta), 1976
- Noel Rosa, o poeta da Vila e seus amores (musical), 1977
- Jesus-homem, 1978 (2ª version of Dia virá, 1967)
- Sob o signo da discothèque, 1979
- Querô, uma reportagem maldita (adaptation of the 1976 novel of same name), 1979
- Madame Blavatski, 1985
- Balada de um palhaço, 1986
- A mancha roxa, 1988
- A dança final, 1993
- O assassinato do anão do caralho grande (adaptation of the novella with the same name), 1995
- O homem do caminho (monologue, originally titled Sempre em Frente), 1996
- O bote da loba, 1997
- Chico Viola (unfinished), 1997

=== Children's plays ===
- As aventuras do coelho Gabriel, 1965
- O coelho e a onça (história dos bichos brasileiros), 1998
- Assembléia dos ratos, 1989
- Seja você mesmo (unfinished)

== Books ==
- Navalha na carne (play), 1968
- Quando as máquinas param (play), 1971
- Histórias das quebradas do mundaréu (short stories), 1973
- Barrela (play) (1976)
- Uma Reportagem Maldita - Querô (novel), 1976
- Inútil canto e inútil pranto pelos anjos caídos (short story), 1977
- Dois perdidos numa noite suja (teatro), 1978
- Oração para um pé-de-chinelo (teatro), s/data
- Jesus-homem (teatro), 1981
- Prisioneiro de uma canção (contos autobiográficos), 1982
- Novas histórias da Barra do Catimbó (contos), s/d
- Madame Blavatski (teatro), 1985
- A figurinha e os soldados da minha rua - histórias populares (relatos autobiográficos), 1986
- Canções e reflexões de um palhaço (textos curtos), 1987
- A mancha roxa (teatro), 1988
- Teatro maldito teatro (contém as peças Barrela, Dois Perdidos Numa Noite Suja e O Abajur Lilás), 1992
- A dança final (teatro), 1994
- Ns triha dos saltimbancos (conto), data imprecisa
- O assassinato do anão do caralho grande (noveleta policial e peça teatral), 1996
- Figurinha difícil - Pornografando e subvertendo (relatos autobiográficos), 1996
- O truque dos espelhos (contos autobiográficos), 1999
- Coleção melhor teatro (com as peças Barrela, Dois perdidos numa noite suja, Navalha na carne, Abajur lilás, Querô), 2003
