= Bonito de Santa Fé =

Coordinates: 7°19′S 38°31′W

- Municipality
- Flag
- Interactive map of Bonito de Santa Fé
- Country: Brazil
- Region: Northeast
- State: Paraíba
- Mesoregion: Sertao Paraibana

Population (2020)
  - Total: 12,022
- Time zone: UTC−3 (BRT)

Bonito de Santa Fé is a municipality in the state of Paraíba in the Northeast Region of Brazil.

== See also ==
- List of municipalities in Paraíba
