= Carla Camurati =

Brazilian actress and filmmaker

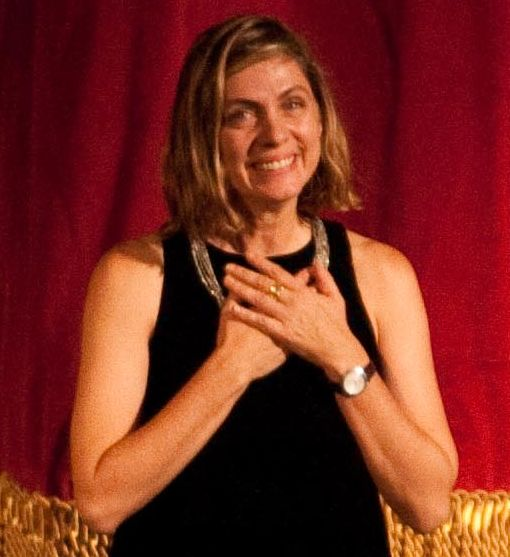
- Carla Camurati in 2010
- Born: Carla de Andrade Camurati; October 14, 1960 (age 65); Rio de Janeiro, Brazil
- Occupations: Actress, filmmaker
- Years active: 1981–present

Carla Camurati (born October 14, 1960) is a Brazilian actress and filmmaker. She became famous for acting in several Rede Globo telenovelas in the 1980s. She also acted in children's theater, starred in films—including Eternamente Pagú for which she won the Best Actress Award of Festival de Gramado—and was the cover of the Brazilian edition of Playboy. In 1995, she debuted as a director with Carlota Joaquina, Princess of Brazil, an important mark in the period of cinema of Brazil known as "Retomada". She was the director of Fundação Theatro Municipal do Rio de Janeiro that administers the Teatro Municipal from 2007 to 2014.

== Selected filmography ==
- Brilhante (1981; actress)
- O Olho Mágico do Amor (1982; actress)
- Sol de Verão (1982; actress)
- Champagne (1983; actress)
- Onda Nova (1983; actress)
- Eternamente Pagú (1986; actress)
- Fera Radical (1988; actress)
- Brasileiras e Brasileiros (1990; actress)
- O Corpo (1991; actress)
- Carlota Joaquina, Princess of Brazil (1995; director, actress)
