= Geni e o Zepelim =

Song by Chico Buarque

from the album Ópera do Malandro
- Language: Brazilian Portuguese
- Released: 1978
- Recorded: 1978
- Genre: MPB
- Length: 6:24
- Songwriter: Chico Buarque

"Geni e o Zepelim" (English: Jenny and Zeppelin) is a Brazilian MPB song, composed and recorded by Chico Buarque for his 1978 album Ópera do Malandro, something to the effect of "Street Smart Opera", or "Smooth Hustler Opera", though Malandro is a culture-specific icon, the soundtrack to the eponymous musical play, in which the song's plot is set; it is also part of its soundtrack. A film adaptation was released in 1986.

The song has become relevant enough that the refrain "joga pedra na Geni [casta a stone at Jenny!,figuratively, casting aspersions upon someone or /Throw a stone at Jenny!/, literally meaning to physically harm a woman who helps the poor and the oppressed through her warmth and willingness to share her body]" has been referenced in situations where people are victims of moral persecution.

In the play, the song is sung by a character who is a travesti.

== Inspiration ==
Some sources suggest Geni could have been inspired by the homonymous character from Nelson Rodrigues's 1965 play Toda Nudez Será Castigada (later adapted into the 1973 drama film All Nudity Shall Be Punished).

== Meaning ==
Various sources believe the song to be critical of colonialism, imperialism and capitalism, and that Geni is a personification of the oppressed groups and peoples.

João Marcos Mateus Kogawa, of Revista Urutágua wrote about "Geni e o Zepelim":

Geni symbolizes silence, submission and non-voice, in the context of a system which prevents her from talking. Nevertheless, her other subject talks through the voice of the author, who portrays her as a martyr or heroine, who attacks her inquisitors' values.

== Cover versions ==
Several artists have covered the song:

- Célia Rabelo
- Cida Moreira
- Elba Ramalho
- Letícia Sabatella
- Maria Eugênia
