= Elsie Houston =

Brazilian singer (1902–1943)

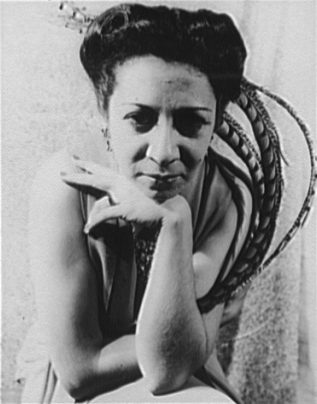
- Born: 22 April 1902; Rio de Janeiro, Brazil
- Died: 20 February 1943 (aged 40); New York City, NY, U.S.
- Occupation: Singer

Elsie Houston (22 April 1902 – 20 February 1943) was a Brazilian singer.

== Biography ==
Elsie Houston was born in Rio de Janeiro in 1902. She was the descendant of confederados, southern plantation owners that had come to Brazil after the American Civil War. Her father was James Franklin Houston, an American dentist from Tennessee who settled in Rio de Janeiro in 1892, and Arinda Galdo, a Brazilian descendant of Portuguese from Madeira Island.

== Career ==
Houston figured in the Brazilian literary/art/music scene during a critical time in its history. It was an era of tremendous creative energy. In addition to Mário de Andrade and Pagu, Houston knew others famous members of this artists movement, including the composer Heitor Villa-Lobos, the painters Flavio de Carvalho, Anita Malfatti and Tarsila do Amaral, and the leader of Brazilian modernism, Oswald de Andrade.

Houston moved to Germany and studied with Lilli Lehmann, a renowned voice teacher. She then studied with another famed soprano, Ninon Vallin, first in Argentina and then in Paris. Houston's relationship with Heitor Villa Lobos began in her teens. Houston was definitely a soloist at Villa Lobos's 1927 Paris concerts. In 1928 she married Benjamin Péret, French surrealist poet, with whom she lived in Brazil from 1929 to 1931. Their son, Geyser, was born in Rio de Janeiro in 1931.

By the late 1930s, Houston had moved to New York City. She was a brilliant singer, particularly skilled in the interpretation of Brazilian songs. The New York Times during this era praised for her performances. She was also an active supporter of young Latin American composers, performing early pieces by composers such as Jayme Ovalle and Camargo Guarnieri.

== Death ==
Houston died in 1943. Her death was reported as an apparent suicide.
