= Maria Werneck de Castro =

Brazilian lawyer

- Born: October 8, 1909; Rio de Janeiro, Brazil
- Died: April 6, 1994 (aged 84); Rio de Janeiro, Brazil
- Occupation: Attorney
- Spouse: Luis Werneck de Castro

Maria Moraes Werneck de Castro (Rio de Janeiro, 1909 - Rio de Janeiro, 1994) was a Brazilian lawyer, militant communist, and feminist.

== Life ==
Castro was born on October 8, 1909 in barrio Laranjeiras, the daughter of attorney Justo de Moraes and Herminia Cresta Mendes de Moraes. Her paternal grandfather was Luiz Mendes de Moraes, who was Minister of War in 1909. In school, she studied law. She married the communist militant Luis Werneck de Castro, also a lawyer.

Castro was a communist activist who fought for women's suffrage rights, from 1930 onwards. She participated in the Federación Brasileña por el Progreso Femenino, and in the Liga Antifascista. Castro was a close friend of Luís Carlos Prestes and his sister, Clotilde Prestes, as well as a companion to Nise da Silveira and Olga Benário Prestes, the latter having been accused of being one of the leaders of the Communist Revolt of 1935. With Mary Mercio and Eugênia Álvaro Moreyra, she co-founded the União Feminina do Brasil, also serving as its director. Castro went into exile in Argentina. She became a member of the Brazilian Communist Party in 1947, serving in the Movimiento Unitario de los Trabajadores e Intelectuales. Towards the end of her life, Castro became devoted to education, being a professor of Portuguese and history.

Castro died on April 6, 1994, in Rio de Janeiro.

== Selected works ==
- Aquarelas : espécies vegetais em extinção (1987) (in Portuguese)
- Sala 4 : primeira prisão política feminina (1988) (in Portuguese)
- No tempo dos barões : histórias do apogeu e decadência de uma família fluminense no ciclo do café (with Moacir Werneck de Castro; 2004) (in Portuguese)
- Natureza viva : memórias, carreira e obra de uma pioneira do desenho científico no Brasil (with Moacir Werneck de Castro; 2004) (in Portuguese)

== See also ==
- List of suffragists and suffragettes

== Bibliography ==
- Assunção, Moacir (2007). Luiz Carlos Prestes: um revolucionário brasileiro (in Portuguese). Lazuli Editora. ISBN 978-85-04-01009-1.
- Dulles, John W. F. (3 July 2014). Brazilian Communism, 1935-1945: Repression during World Upheaval. University of Texas Press. ISBN 978-0-292-77166-6.
- Dulles, John W. F. (5 July 2010). Carlos Lacerda, Brazilian Crusader: Volume I: The Years 1914-1960. University of Texas Press. ISBN 978-0-292-78936-4.
- Executive Secretariat (1987). Tricontinental. Executive Secretariat of the Organization of Solidarity of the Peoples of Africa, Asia, and Latin America.
- Schumaher, Schuma; Brazil, Erico Vital (2000). Dicion‡rio mulheres do Brasil: de 1500 até a atualidade : com 270 ilustrações (in Portuguese). J. Zahar. ISBN 978-85-7110-573-7.
