= Maria Alice Vergueiro =

Brazilian actress (1935–2020)

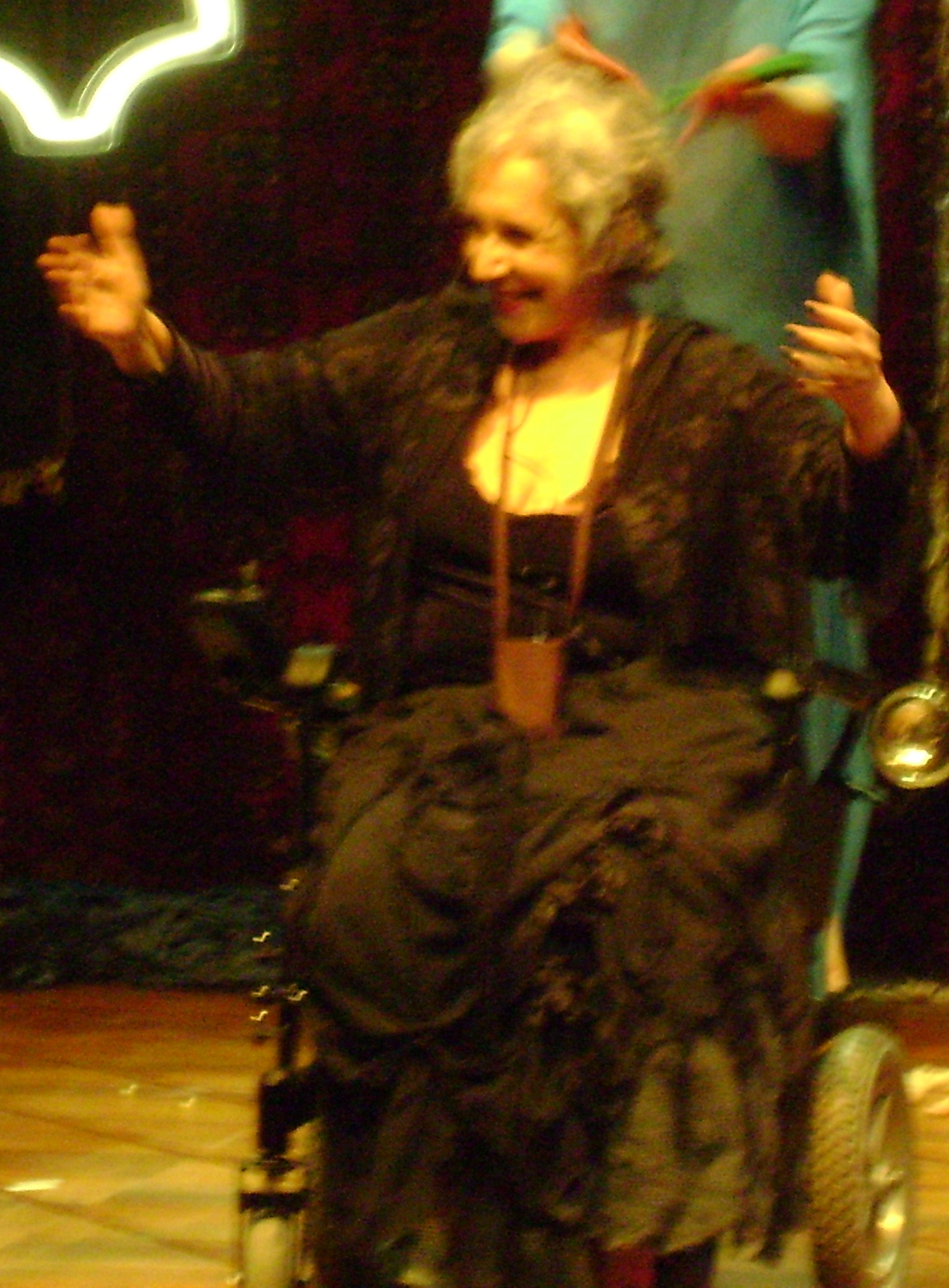
- Born: Maria Alice Monteiro de Campos Vergueiro; January 19, 1935; São Paulo, São Paulo, Brazil
- Died: June 3, 2020 (aged 85); São Paulo, São Paulo, Brazil
- Occupation: Actress
- Years active: 1962 - 2006

Maria Alice Monteiro de Campos Vergueiro (19 January 1935 – 3 June 2020) was a Brazilian actress and professor with an extensive career on stage, cinema, and television.

== Career ==
Born in São Paulo, her theatrical debut was in 1962 in the show The Mandrake ("A Mandrágora") under the direction of Augusto Boal. Later, she began working with the Teatro Oficina, where she appeared in the historical setting of O Rei da Vela (by Oswald de Andrade), under the direction of José Celso Martinez Corrêa, which was later made into a film. She worked with the Living Theatre. She was the founder, along with Luiz Roberto Galízia and Cacá Rosset, of the Teatro do Ornitorrinco where she has appeared in various shows.

In 2006 she gained renewed fame for the short film Tapa na Pantera, directed by Esmir Filho, Mariana Bastos and Rafael Gomes, in which she plays a woman who has smoked marijuana for 30 years and talks about her experiences with the drug, a character based on the actress' own experiences. The short became a success in less than a week when it was posted on YouTube without the permission of the authors.

In the theater scene of São Paulo, she is known as "Dama do Underground" or "Velha Dama Indigna." She taught at the School of Communications and Arts of the University of São Paulo.

Vergueiro died from pneumonia and COVID-19 on 3 June 2020, in São Paulo.

== Works ==
=== For theater ===
- Vigília Literária (2005)
- O Clássico da Vanguarda: documentação e história (2005)
- Temporada de Gripe (2003)
- Mãe Coragem e Seus Filhos (2002)
- Sabah das Bruxas (1999)
- O Avarento (1998)
- No Alvo (1996)
- A Comédia dos Erros (1994)
- O Amor de Dom Perlimplim com Belisa em seu Jardim (acted and directed, 1992)
- O Doente Imaginário (1989)
- E Ponha o Tédio no...Ó (1989)
- A Velha Dama Indigna (1988)
- Katastrophé (1986)
- Eletra Com Creta (1986)
- O Gosto da Própria Carne (1985)
- O Belo Indiferente (1983)
- Mahagonny Songspiel (1983)
- O Lírio do Inferno (1982)
- O Percevejo (1981)
- A Ópera do Malandro (1978)
- Teatro do Ornitorrinco Canta Brecht e Weill (1977)
- Os Mais Fortes (1977)
- Delírio Tropical (1977)
- Galileu Galilei (1975)
- O Casamento do Pequeno Burguês (1973)
- Gracias, Señor (1972)
- O Rei da Vela (1967)
- A Grande Chantagem (1965)
- A Ópera dos Três Vinténs (1964)
- A Mandrágora (1962)

=== For cinema ===
- Tapa na Pantera - Pantera (2006)
- Ato II Cena 5 - Actress (2004)
- Cronicamente Inviável (2000)
- A Grande Noitada (1997)
- Perfume de Gardênia (1992)
- O Corpo – Wife of the chief of police (1991)
- Romance (1988)
- Urubus e Papagaios (1985)
- O Rei da Vela (1983)
- Maldita Coincidência (1979)
- Amor e Medo (1974)

== For television ==
- Brava Gente - Márcia (2000)
- Sassaricando - Lucrécia (1987)
