= Cadernos Pagu =

Brazilian academic journal

Cadernos Pagu is a Brazilian academic journal on gender studies and sexuality. It was established in 1993 at the Universidade Estadual de Campinas. Pagu was the nickname of Patrícia Galvão, an iconic Brazilian feminist. The journal is published in Portuguese and the editor-in-chief is Leila Mezan Algranti (Universidade Estadual de Campinas).

== Abstracting and indexing ==
The journal is abstracted and indexed in:

- Sociological Abstracts
- MLA International Bibliography
- International Bibliography of Periodical Literature
- International Bibliography of Book Reviews of Scholarly Literature
