= Pagu =

Brazilian writer (1910–1962)

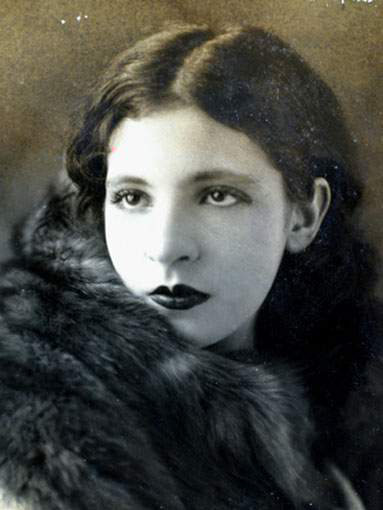
- Pagu in the late 1920s
- Born: Patrícia Rehder Galvão; 9 June 1910; São João da Boa Vista
- Died: 12 December 1962 (aged 52); Santos
- Spouse(s): Oswald de Andrade (1930-1935); Geraldo Ferraz (1941-1962)
- Children: Rudá de Andrade; Geraldo Galvão de Andrade
- Writing career
- Language: Portuguese
- Literary movement: Modernism

Patrícia Rehder Galvão, known by her pseudonym Pagu (June 9, 1910 – December 12, 1962) was a Brazilian writer, poet, playwright, journalist, and translator who had a large role in the Brazilian Modernist movement. Pagu was also politically active, being associated to the Brazilian Communist Party during the 1930s.

== Biography ==
Born in a family of Portuguese, Spanish, and German descent, Galvão was an "advanced" woman for the moral and social standards of the time. When she was 15 years old, she collaborated with the Brás Jornal newspaper, using the pen name Patsy.

She completed secondary education at the São Paulo Normal School in 1928, and joined the Movimento Antropofágico, influenced by Oswald de Andrade and Tarsila do Amaral. The nickname "Pagu" was given to her by the poet Raul Bopp, who dedicated a poem to her (Coco de Pagu). In 1930, Pagu married Oswald de Andrade, who recently had left Tarsila, then his wife. In the same year, Rudá de Andrade, her first and Andrade's second son is born. Both became militants of the Brazilian Communist Party and together they founded the political newspaper O Homem do Povo (The People's Man), which lasted for eight issues before being closed by São Paulo police. There, Pagu wrote the column "A Mulher do Povo" (The People's Woman) and drew the comic strip "Malakabeça, Fanika e Kabeluda".

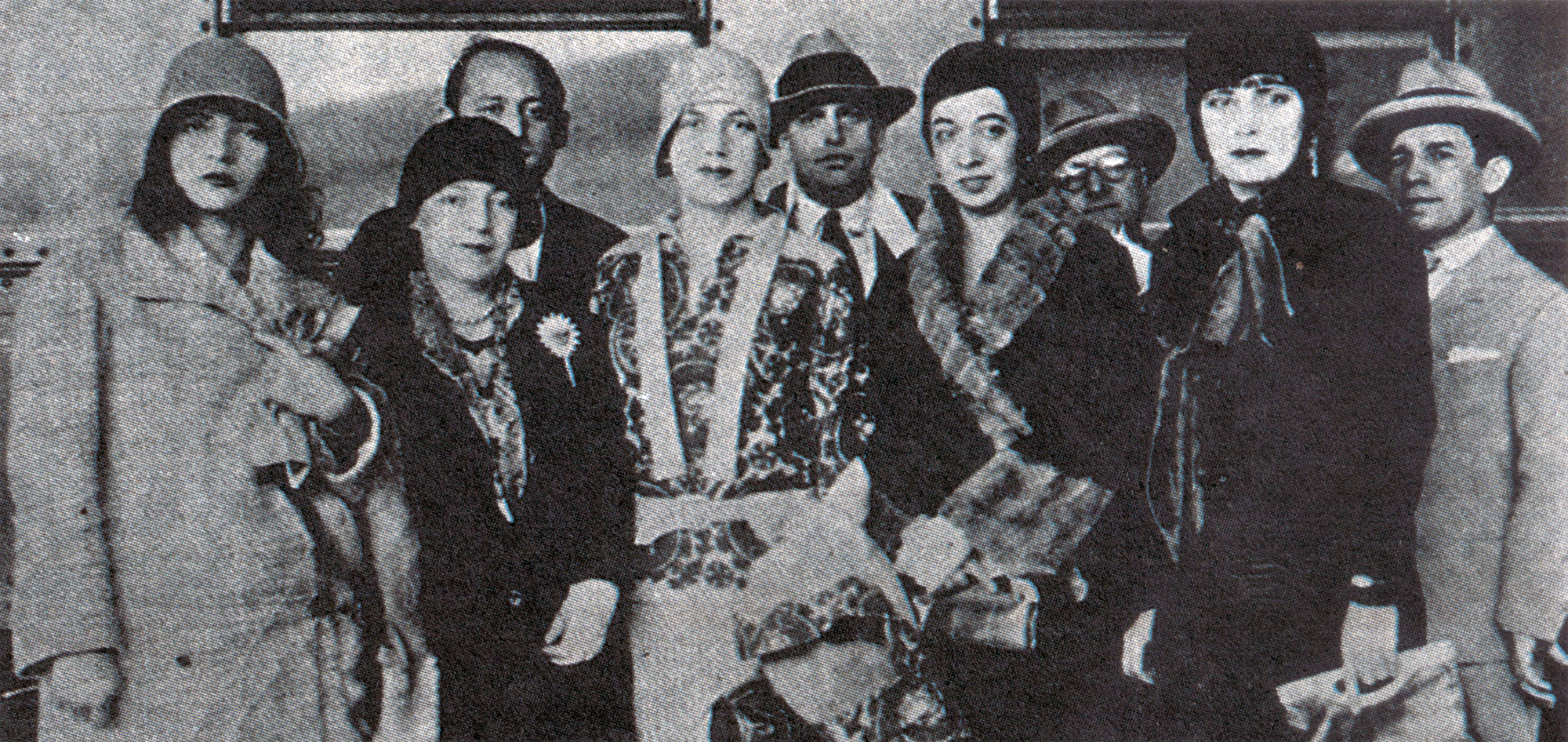
From left to right: Pagu, Elsie Lessa, Tarsila do Amaral, Anita Malfatti & Eugênia Álvaro Moreyra circa 1928

Pagu was arrested in 1931 by participating in a harbor workers' strike in Santos, the first in a series of 23 detentions in her life. After her arrest she published the novel Parque Industrial (Industrial Park), under the pseudonym Mara Lobo.

In 1935 she was arrested in Paris as a foreign communist using a false identity, and was repatriated to Brazil. She broke up with Andrade, after many quarrels. Pagu then resumed her journalistic activity, but was again arrested and tortured by the forces of the Getúlio Vargas dictatorship, and was jailed for five years. During those five years her son was raised by Andrade. Upon leaving prison in 1940, she broke away from the Communist Party, choosing to follow a socialism of Trotskyist line instead. She joined the newspaper A Vanguarda Socialista along with Geraldo Ferraz, art critic Mário Pedrosa, Hilcar Leite and Edmundo Moniz.

She married Geraldo Ferraz and from this union her second son was born, Geraldo Galvão Ferraz, on June 18, 1941. She moved in with her two children and her husband. Around the same time she travelled to China, obtaining there the first soybean seeds that were introduced in Brazil.

In 1945 Pagu launched a new novel, A Famosa Revista, written with her husband Geraldo Ferraz. She unsuccessfully attempted a run for state representative in the 1950 elections.

In 1952 she attended the School of Dramatic Art in São Paulo, taking their shows to Santos. Linked to the avant-garde theater, they presented her translation of Ionesco's The Bald Singer. She translated and directed Fando et Lis by Fernando Arrabal, an amateur montage in which the young artist Plínio Marcos debuted. She also translated poems by authors such as Guillaume Apollinaire. Known as a major cultural influence in Santos, Pagu encouraged young talents such as actor and playwright Plinio Marcos and composer Gilberto Mendes. She devoted herself particularly to the stage, especially in encouraging amateur groups.

While still working as an art critic, she was stricken with cancer. She traveled to Paris to undergo surgery, but without positive results. Disappointed and desperately sick, Pagu attempted suicide, but did not succeed. Of this episode, she wrote the pamphlet "Truth and Freedom": "A bullet got behind, between gauze pads and shattered memories." She returned to Brazil and died on December 12, 1962, due to the disease.

== Literature ==
Pagu published the novels Industrial Park (the author's edition, 1933), under the pseudonym Mara Lobo, considered the first Brazilian proletarian novel, and A Famosa Revista (The Famous Magazine) (Americ-Edit, 1945), in collaboration with Geraldo Ferraz. Industrial Park was published in the United States in translation of Kenneth David Jackson in 1994 by the University of Nebraska Press. A version in Spanish of this novel was published in 2016 and translated by Martín Camps, Professor at the University of the Pacific in Stockton, California. She has also written detective stories under the pseudonym King Shelter, originally published in Detective magazine, directed by playwright Nelson Rodrigues, and then gathered in Safra Macabra (Livraria José Olympio Editora, 1998).

In her work, along with theater groups, she revealed and translated great authors hitherto unpublished in Brazil, such as James Joyce, Eugène Ionesco, Fernando Arrabal and Octavio Paz.

One of Pagu’s most famous pieces is her book, Parque Industrial, which was published in 1933 and offers insight into the social and economic issues that Brazil faced during the post-World War period. The book follows three young women during the 1930s, a time when the workforce was misogynistic. Marxism is a major theme throughout this novel, its significance reflected in the time period. The book depicts real hardships faced by women, not shying from depicting gruesome events. The perspectives of the novel's three major characters offers a holistic view of life in Sao Paulo, Brazil during the 1930s.

== Cultural depictions ==
In 1988, the life of Pagu was told in the film Eternamente Pagu, the first movie directed by Norma Bengell. Carla Camurati played the title role.

A song titled "Pagu" was composed by Rita Lee and Zélia Duncan.
