= Ninho da Serpente =

Brazilian telenovela

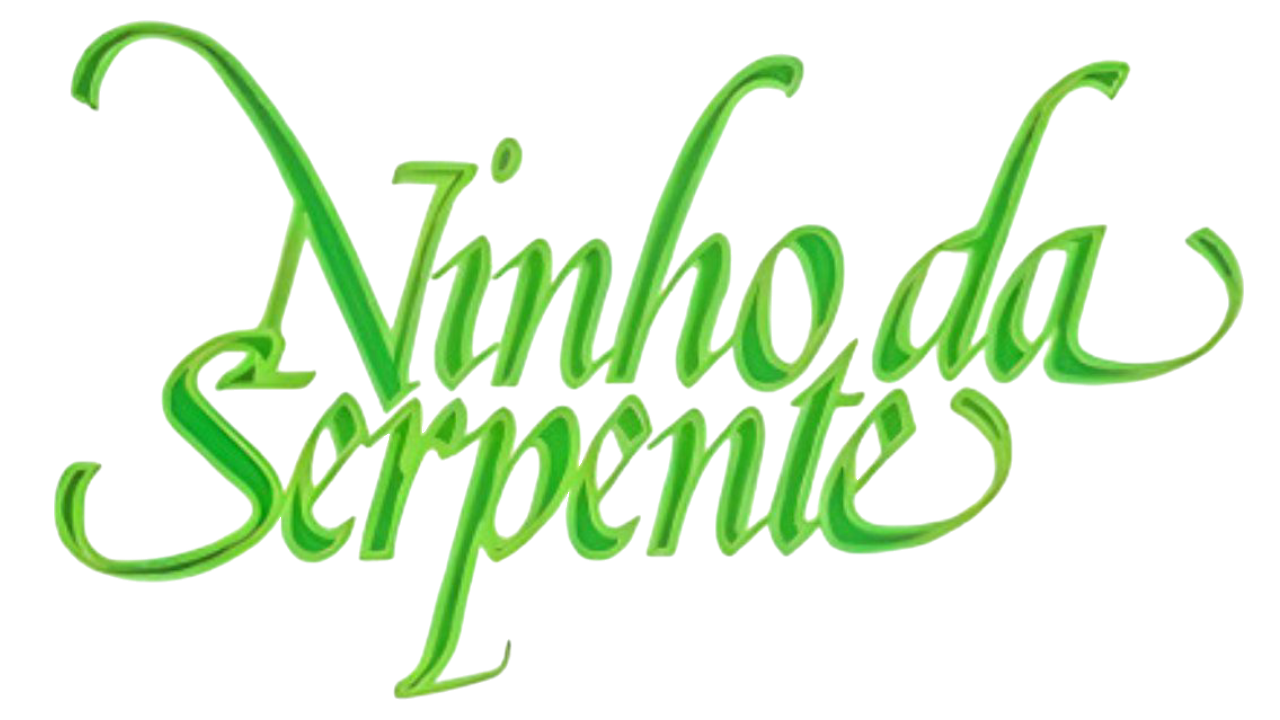
- Genre: Telenovela; Drama; Suspense; Mystery
- Created by: Jorge Andrade
- Directed by: Henrique Martins
- Starring: Main cast: Cleyde Yáconis; Kito Junqueira; Eliane Giardini; Laura Cardoso; Beatriz Segall; Juca de Oliveira; Selma Egrei; Othon Bastos; Júlia Lemmertz; Carmem Silva; Antônio Petrin; Márcia de Windsor; Luiz Carlos de Moraes; Imara Reis; Jairo Arco e Flexa (See more)
- Opening theme: "Yosaku", James Last
- Ending theme: "Yosaku", James Last
- Composer: Kiminori Nanasawa
- Country of origin: Brazil
- Original language: Portuguese
- No. of episodes: 120

Production
- Executive producer: José Vivaldo Reis
- Producer: Osório Miranda
- Production location: São Paulo
- Editor: Jorge Darmaros
- Running time: 45 minutes
- Production company: Band

Original release
- Network: Band
- Release: 5 April – 27 August 1982

Ninho da Serpente is a Brazilian telenovela produced and aired by Band between April 5 and August 27, 1982, in 120 chapters. It was written by Jorge Andrade, supervised by Antonio Abujamra, under the direction of Henrique Martins.

It features Cleyde Yáconis, Kito Junqueira, Eliane Giardini, Laura Cardoso, Beatriz Segall, Juca de Oliveira, Selma Egrei and Othon Bastos in the main roles.

== Plot ==
The traditional Taques Penteado clan is closely linked to the history of São Paulo itself and is regarded as a significant representative of the São Paulo business world. Ailing, Cândido Taques, brother of matriarch Guilhermina Taques Penteado, lived isolated from everyone on the third floor of the family mansion in the elegant Jardim Europa neighborhood. Cândido's death puts the clan members on alert, as they await his inheritance—a vast fortune in cash, jewelry, and stocks.

The dispute over the inheritance, in the environment dominated by Guilhermina, and the interplay of interests among the heirs trigger numerous conflicts, creating a climate of oppression. The characters reveal themselves through their greater or lesser efforts to gain access to the fortune. Some show no qualms about obtaining it, while others, more skillful and diplomatic, resort to less petty means: for example, they seek to capitalize on a close relationship with the matriarch.

At the center of it all is the all-powerful Guilhermina, for whom it matters little where the money comes from as long as her family remains in power. However, inexplicably, the nurse Mateus, who cared for Cândido until his death, ends up being one of the main beneficiaries of the fortune. Mateus also becomes involved with one of the heiresses, Lídia, giving rise to social prejudice. The climax is the mysterious murder of the maid Marinalda, whose perpetrator is linked to Guilhermina's past.

== Cast ==
Actor/Actress	Character
Cleyde Yáconis	Guilhermina Taques Penteado
Kito Junqueira	Mateus Barroso
Eliane Giardini	Lídia Taques Penteado de Andrade
Laura Cardoso	Eugênia Barroso
Beatriz Segall	Noêmia Taques Penteado de Andrade
Juca de Oliveira	Dr. Almeida Prado
Selma Egrei	Consuelo Taques Penteado
Othon Bastos	Samuel Razuk
Júlia Lemmertz	Mariana Taques Penteado Reis
Carmem Silva	Maria Clara Taques Penteado
Antônio Petrin	Joaquim
Márcia de Windsor	Jerusa Taques Penteado Torres
Luiz Carlos de Moraes	Luís Eulálio Torres
Imara Reis	Norma Taques Penteado Reis
Jairo Arco e Flexa	Márcio Reis
Raymundo de Souza	Eduardo Taques Penteado
Danúbia Machado	Lia Barroso
Mayara Magri	Marinalda
Paulo César Grande	Karl Taques Penteado de Andrade
Giuseppe Oristânio	André Taques Penteado de Andrade
Flávio Guarnieri	Rogério Taques Penteado Torres
Hugo Della Santa	Alex Taques Penteado Reis
Déborah Seabra	Bernarda Taques Penteado Torres
Edgard Franco	Delegado Romeu
Valdir Fernandes	Dr. Mário
Lúcia Mello	Rosalina
Jairo Arco e Flexa	Márcio
Denise Stoklos	Oriana
Geny Prado	Gabi
Sônia Oiticica	Júlia
Emílio di Biasi	Cassiano
Alexandre Raymundo	Ronald Taques Penteado Reis

=== Special appearances ===
Actor/Actress	Character
Kate Lyra	Pietra
Nydia Lícia	Olímpia

== Production ==
=== Start ===
Production of Ninho da Serpente began in March 1982, when writer Jorge Andrade, after completing Os Adolescentes, began developing a new telenovela for Band (then known as Rede Bandeirantes). The working title was Ninho de Serpente, and the series was conceived as a replacement for Ivani Ribeiro's telenovela. Henrique Martins was initially the director, responsible for the first 20 episodes, filmed in the mansion that served as the central setting, under the supervision of Antônio Abujamra. Later, Antonino Seabra was hired to co-direct, taking charge of the exterior filming, which took place in locations such as nightclubs, industrial plants, cemeteries, and bus stations.

Set among the upper-middle-class São Paulo, the plot blended reality and fiction. According to the author, well-known society figures, such as Chiquinho Scarpa, played themselves alongside the fictional characters.

The main setting was a 30-room mansion at 193 Guatemala Street in Jardins, São Paulo, treated as a central character in the story. Built by Count Francisco Matarazzo for his son Eduardo, the house was rented by the network and previously lived in by Zulmirinha Lunardelli, who served as inspiration for the author.

The plot revolved around matriarch Guilhermina Taques Penteado (Cleyde Yáconis) and the dispute over the inheritance left by her brother Cândido, an eccentric millionaire compared to Howard Hughes, who never appeared in the plot. With no direct heirs, Cândido left only siblings and nephews, and his will, worth 10 billion cruzeiros, was the center of the conflict, introduced in the very first chapter. The narrative, with a detective novel feel, explored betrayal, selfishness, greed, and murder. Jorge Andrade emphasized that the struggle in the plot took place within the very social class that held power and wealth, in contrast to Os Ossos do Barão, whose clash was between the upper bourgeoisie and the immigrant class. Initially planned for around 80 episodes, the telenovela was extended to 120 after the author agreed to write 40 more.

=== Casting ===
The cast featured a large number of actors. Leading lady Cleyde Yáconis played Guilhermina Taques Penteado, a 70-year-old matriarch who controlled the family and its fortune. She wore long dresses to disguise a defect in her leg and carried a cane with a silver handle shaped like a greyhound's head. Her older sister was Maria Clara (Carmem Silva).

Her five children were: Noêmia (Beatriz Segal), objective and business-oriented; Jerusa (Márcia de Windsor), the romantic; Norma (Imara Reis), a casino-goer; Consuelo (Selma Egrei), a rebel and a fan of casual dress; and Eduardo (Raimundo de Souza). Consuelo was Guilhermina's illegitimate daughter with driver Joaquim (Antônio Petrin). Jerusa and Norma's husbands were Luís Eulálio (Luiz Carlos de Moraes) and Márcio (Jairo Arco e Flexa), respectively. Actress Márcia de Windsor died on August 4, 1982, a natural, sudden death due to a coronary accident, three weeks after the end of the soap opera, this being her last appearance in soap operas.

Among the grandchildren and other characters, Noêmia's children stood out: Lídia (Eliane Giardini), André (Giuseppe Oristânio) and Karl (Paulo César Grande). Karl was a young surfer, averse to social conventions, who preferred sportswear and brighter colors. Eliane Giardini played Lídia, a traditionalist who clashed with her grandmother because of her immorality. Lídia was attracted to the nurse Mateus, which unbalanced her emotionally. Jerusa's children were Bernarda (Deborah Seabra) and Rogério (Flávio Guarnieri). Norma's children were Alex (Hugo Della Santa), Mariana (Júlia Lemmertz), and Ronald (Alexandre Raymundo). Alex was an ambitious and cold young man who inherited the family's bourgeois values. During the final sequence of Cândido's will reading, Alex, played by Hugo Della Santa, was found sleeping in Guilhermina's room. That same week, Alex (Hugo Della Santa) and Bernarda (Deborah Seabra) left the series. Alex moved to England, while Bernarda went to Paris to take a secretarial course at Mateus's request.

The cast also included nurse Mateus (Kito Junqueira), who cared for Cândido Taques until his death. Mateus was Cândido's biological son with Olímpia (Nídia Lycia) and the main beneficiary of the inheritance. Actress Laura Cardoso was hired by Band to play Eugênia, Mateus's adoptive mother. Danúbia Machado played Lia de Andrade, Mateus's sister and Eugênia's daughter. Nídia Lycia played Olímpia Sampaio, Mateus's biological mother, who had an affair with Cândido. Kate Lyra was also hired by Band, playing Pietra, an American descendant of Russian immigrants who came to sway Mateus's heart. Police Chief Maurício (Edgard Franco), inspired by Police Chief Romeu Tuma, was investigating the murder of waitress Marinalda (Mayara Magri) and Ronald's kidnapping. Initially, the character was to be called Romeu. In June, Maurício and the psychoanalyst Mário (Waldir Fernandes) entered the scene, responsible for sessions with family members, with Rogério as a regular patient.

Other characters included Rosalina (Lúcia Mello), an ostracized actress and family friend, who leaves the plot to accompany Bernarda to Paris; Samuel Razuk (Othon Bastos), a lawyer whose role was originally played by Flávio Galvão; and Dr. Almeida Prado (Juca de Oliveira), as well as Emílio Di Biasi (Cassiano), Júlia Lemmertz (Mariana) and Denise Stoklos (the mysterious Oriana).

=== Premiere and broadcast ===
Ninho da Serpente premiered on April 5, 1982, at 9:15 PM, on Band. Starting on May 10, the telenovela was moved to 8:00 PM, specifically 8:15 PM, to make room for the program Boa Noite Brasil, starring Flávio Cavalcanti. The time change was intended to boost the telenovela's ratings.

=== Filming in Rio de Janeiro ===
In June 1982, Band went to Rio de Janeiro to film scenes for the soap opera, but the project was considered a "failure" and several takes had to be relocated. Despite this, a sequence of scenes filmed in the city would be presented in chapter 55, showing the characters Mateus (Kito Junqueira), Eduardo (Raymundo de Souza), Consuelo (Selma Egrei) and Mariana (Júlia Lemmertz) on a trip to Guanabara Bay aboard João Flávio Lemos de Moraes' yacht, the "late Lourdes".

=== End of filming ===
Filming for Ninho da Serpente ended in August 1982. The telenovela, which was initially scheduled for 80 episodes, had its total increased to 120 after Jorge Andrade agreed to write 40 more episodes, delaying the final episode until August. The final recording went off without a hitch, as reported by Selma Egrei, with Andrade having already completed the final 119 episodes. There were only a few scenes left and five episodes remaining, and the impasse would be resolved through editing, according to Band.

== Music ==
=== Ninho da Serpente – Trilha Sonora Original Nacional ===
Ninho da Serpente – Trilha Sonora Original Nacional

Soundtrack album by Various artists
- Released: June 1982
- Genre: MPB
- Length: 42:37
- Language: Portuguese
- Label: Philips · Disco Ban
- Producer: Elvio Bombardi

Ninho da Serpente chronology
Ninho da Serpente – Trilha Sonora Original Nacional (1982)	Ninho da Serpente – Trilha Sonora Original Internacional (1982)

Ninho da Serpente – Trilha Sonora Original Nacional is the soundtrack to the Brazilian telenovela of the same name broadcast by Band, released in June 1982 by Philips under the Disco Ban label (the network's own record label) and distributed by PolyGram. It features music production by Elvio Bombardi.

The soundtrack features songs by MPB artists such as Elis Regina, Emílio Santiago, Chico Buarque, Gal Costa, Caetano Veloso, Claudette Soares, Chico da Silva, Fafá de Belém, Jair Rodrigues, Tunai and Wando. The songs complement the telenovela's narrative, evoking themes of mystery, suspense, betrayal, drama, love and heartbreak.

=== Track listing ===
Side A
No.	Title	Writer(s)	Artist(s)	Length
1.	"Atrás da Porta"	Chico Buarque de Holanda; Francis Hime	Elis Regina	2:49
2.	"Outra Vez"	Isolda	Emílio Santiago	3:52
3.	"Vida"	Chico Buarque	Chico Buarque	3:24
4.	"Baby"	Caetano Veloso	Gal Costa and Caetano Veloso	3:32
5.	"Como é Grande Meu Amor por Você"	Roberto Carlos	Claudette Soares	3:10
6.	"Tudo Mudou"	Chico da Silva; Venâncio	Chico da Silva	4:31

Side B
No.	Title	Writer(s)	Artist(s)	Length
7.	"Bilhete"	Ivan Lins; Vítor Martins	Fafá de Belém	4:42
8.	"As Rosas não Falam"	Cartola	Emílio Santiago	2:47
9.	"Chuvas de Verão"	Fernando Lobo	Caetano Veloso	2:51
10.	"Pra Não Dizer Que Não Falei de Flores"	Geraldo Vandré	Jair Rodrigues	3:20
11.	"Às Aparências Enganam"	Tunai; Sérgio Natureza	Tunai	3:58
12.	"Maior Desejo"	Wando	Wando	3:20

=== Ninho da Serpente – Trilha Sonora Original Internacional ===
Ninho da Serpente – Trilha Sonora Original Internacional

Soundtrack album by Various artists
- Released: July 1982
- Genres: Pop; rock; new wave; reggae; romantic; instrumental
- Length: 42:20
- Language: English
- Label: Epic · Disco Ban

Ninho da Serpente chronology
Ninho da Serpente – Trilha Sonora Original Nacional (1982)	Ninho da Serpente – Trilha Sonora Original Internacional (1982)

Ninho da Serpente – Trilha Sonora Original Internacional is the second soundtrack of the Brazilian telenovela of the same name broadcast by Band, released in July 1982 by Epic Records under the Disco Ban label (the network's own record label) and distribution by CBS.

The album is composed mostly of songs in English, featuring performances by renowned artists such as John Denver, Plácido Domingo, Barbra Streisand, Elkie Brooks, Bertie Higgins, French pianist Richard Clayderman, Tom Tom Club, Jamaican group Third World, Booker T. Jones, Miguel Bosé, and the musical group Happy. The songs complement the telenovela's narrative, evoking themes of conflict, love, disillusionment, and the complexity of human relationships, aligning with the drama and disappointments that permeate the telenovela's plot.

=== Track listing ===
Side A
No.	Title	Writer(s)	Artist(s)	Length
1.	"Perhaps Love"	John Denver	Plácido Domingo & John Denver	2:56
2.	"Shine On"	George Duke	George Duke	3:44
3.	"If You Break My Heart"	D. Essex; S. Colyer	Miguel Bosé	3:26
4.	"Fool If You Think It's Over"	C. Rea	Elkie Brooks	4:58
5.	"Key Largo"	B. Higgins; S. Limbo	Bertie Higgins	2:59
6.	"Inna Time Like This"	K. Michael Cooper	Third World	4:31

Side B
No.	Title	Writer(s)	Artist(s)	Length
7.	"L'Espoir" (Instrumental)	O. Toussaint	Richard Clayderman	3:12
8.	"Wordy Rappinghood"	Tom Tom Club	Tom Tom Club	3:44
9.	"Memory"	A. L. Weber; T. S. Eliot; T. Nunn	Barbra Streisand	3:52
10.	"I Want You"	Booker T. Jones; Michael Stokes	Booker T. Jones	4:36
11.	"Annie's Song"	John Denver	Plácido Domingo	3:00
12.	"Viva America"	Louis Rodríguez; Larry Zanga Heney	Happy	3:55
