= Cultura Artística =

Cultura Artística may refer to:

- Sociedade de Cultura Artística, a Brazilian cultural organization
- Teatro Cultura Artística, a theater in São Paulo, Brazil
