= Mayara Magri =

Mayara Magri may refer to:

- Mayara Magri (actress), Brazilian actress
- Mayara Magri (dancer), Brazilian dancer
