= Architecture of Brazil =

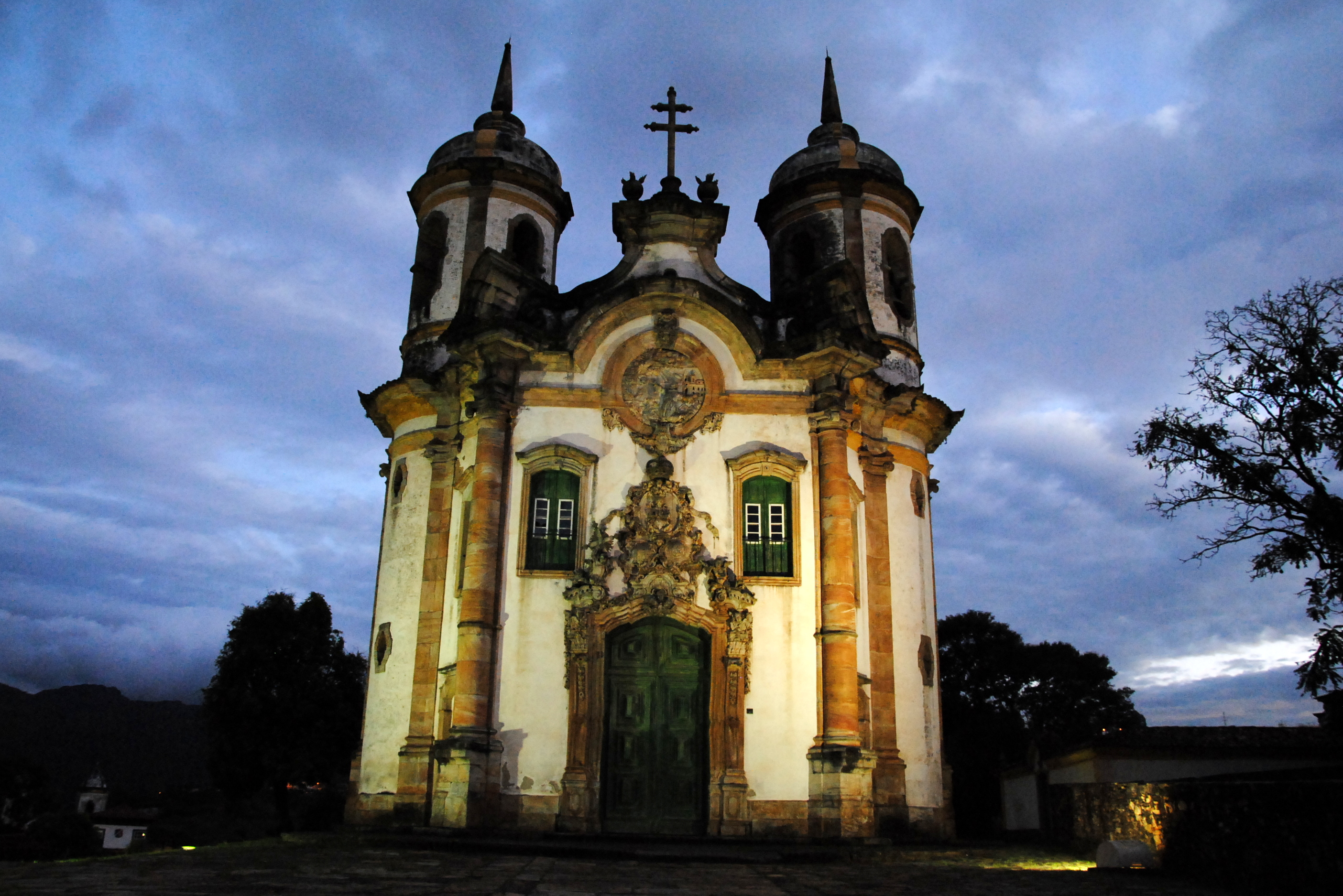
The Church of São Francisco de Assis in Ouro Preto, one of the best known architectural icons of Baroque architecture in Brazil

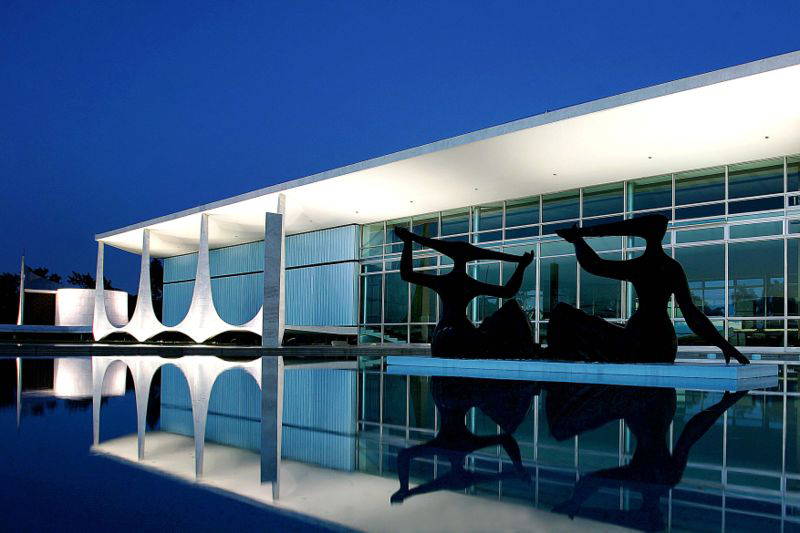
The Palácio da Alvorada in Brasília, listed as a National Historic Heritage Site

The architecture of Brazil is influenced by Europe, especially Portugal. It has a history that goes back 500 years to the time when Pedro Cabral arrived in Brazil in 1500. Portuguese colonial architecture was the first wave of architecture to go to Brazil.

In the 18th century, during the time of the Empire, Brazil followed European trends and adopted Neoclassical, Baroque, and Gothic Revival architecture. Then, in the 20th century especially in Brasília, Brazil experimented with Modernist architecture. The modernist approach was named as minimalism without the need for excessive frills or decoration. Instead, the architecture became more simplistic, with clean lines and a functional form. This style became more popular around the end of World War II, when function was more important than form. During this time, Oscar Niemeyer, who became and remains one of the world's greatest modernists, began to present a style that was to become Brazil's very own style.

== Indigenous architecture ==
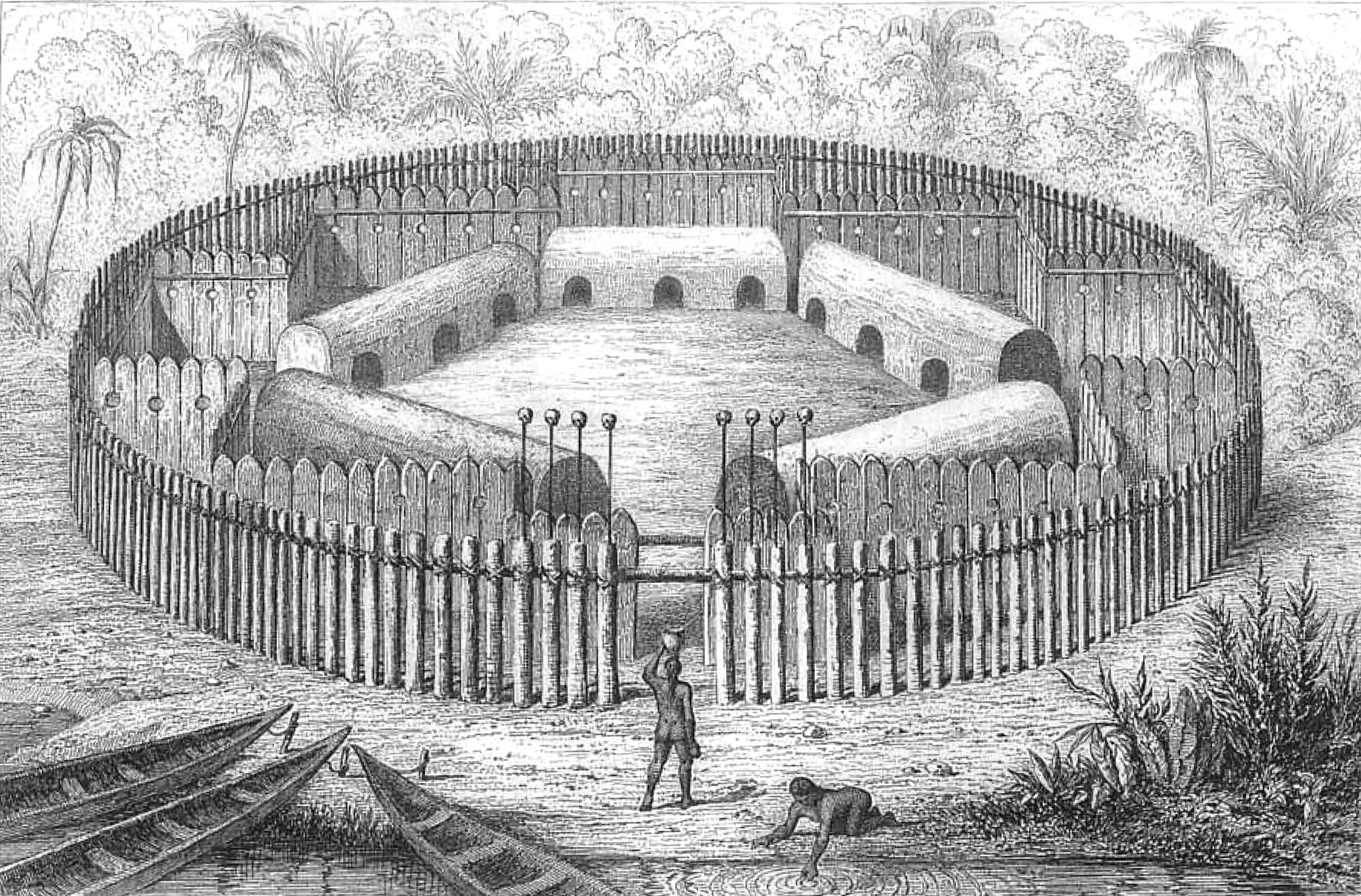
An 1854 depiction of an indigenous village (taba) showing a group of ocas arranged in a circle surrounded by a wooden palisade

The diverse groups of Indigenous Brazilians developed architectural styles that varied by region and available materials. An important style of dwelling is the so-called oca. A wooden structure covered with straw or palm leaves, that was for collective use and had no internal divisions. Several ocas could be organized around a circular plaza. They could reach up to 30 m in length and 10 m in height.

Another example is the Maloca, a type of large, communal cabin used by some indigenous people in the Amazon regions of northern Brazil and southern Colombia.

This vernacular architecture is still common among contemporary indigenous peoples in northern Brazil. Historically this type of architecture did not have widespread use among non-indigenous Brazilians. Recently, however, these architectural models, reinterpreted with current techniques and materials, have received attention from some architects as an ecological alternative to address modern housing problem.

== Portuguese colonial architecture in the 16th century ==
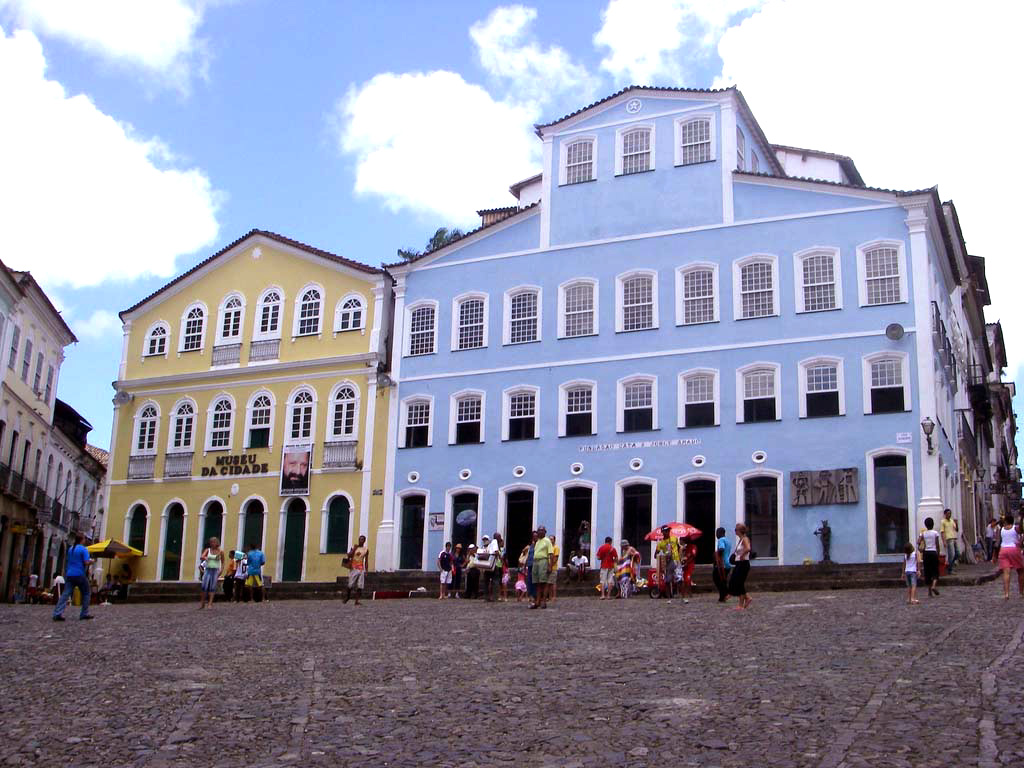
Portuguese colonial architecture, Salvador.

The colonial architecture of Brazil dates to the early 16th century when Brazil was first explored, created and settled by the Portuguese, who created an architecture familiar to them in Europe. They built sacred and secular buildings, including houses and forts in Brazilian cities and the countryside. They founded Recife, São Paulo, Rio de Janeiro, Salvador in the colonial period; these cities saw the best expression of Brazilian architecture.

Buildings of this period were distinct because they followed similar rules such as:

- symmetry
- box-like structure
- alcoves and recessed windows
- constructed from stone and mortar
- covered with plaster for a smooth finish

The best examples are in the city of Salvador, with its multi-colored colonial buildings that outline the streets and depict Salvador's history.

=== Salvador ===
Founded in the 1500s, Salvador is one of the oldest cities in Brazil and home to impressive colonial and baroque architecture. The city was Brazil's first capital until 1763 and is known for its spectacular colonial and baroque styles. After defeating the Dutch in the 17th century, Portuguese settlers built and refurbished several forts along the Bay, including São Marcelo Fort. The port stands perfectly round on a small reef bank about 1,000 feet off the coast. Brazilian writer Jorge Amado described it as the "Belly button of Bahia.".

One of the most well-known pieces of architecture in Salvador is the Lacerda Elevator. Built around 1872, this structure linked both upper and lower cities with four elevators, with air conditioning and offering views of the bay. Furthermore, the city has numerous buildings with meaningful cultural and historical significance.

== 18th-19th century Brazilian architecture ==
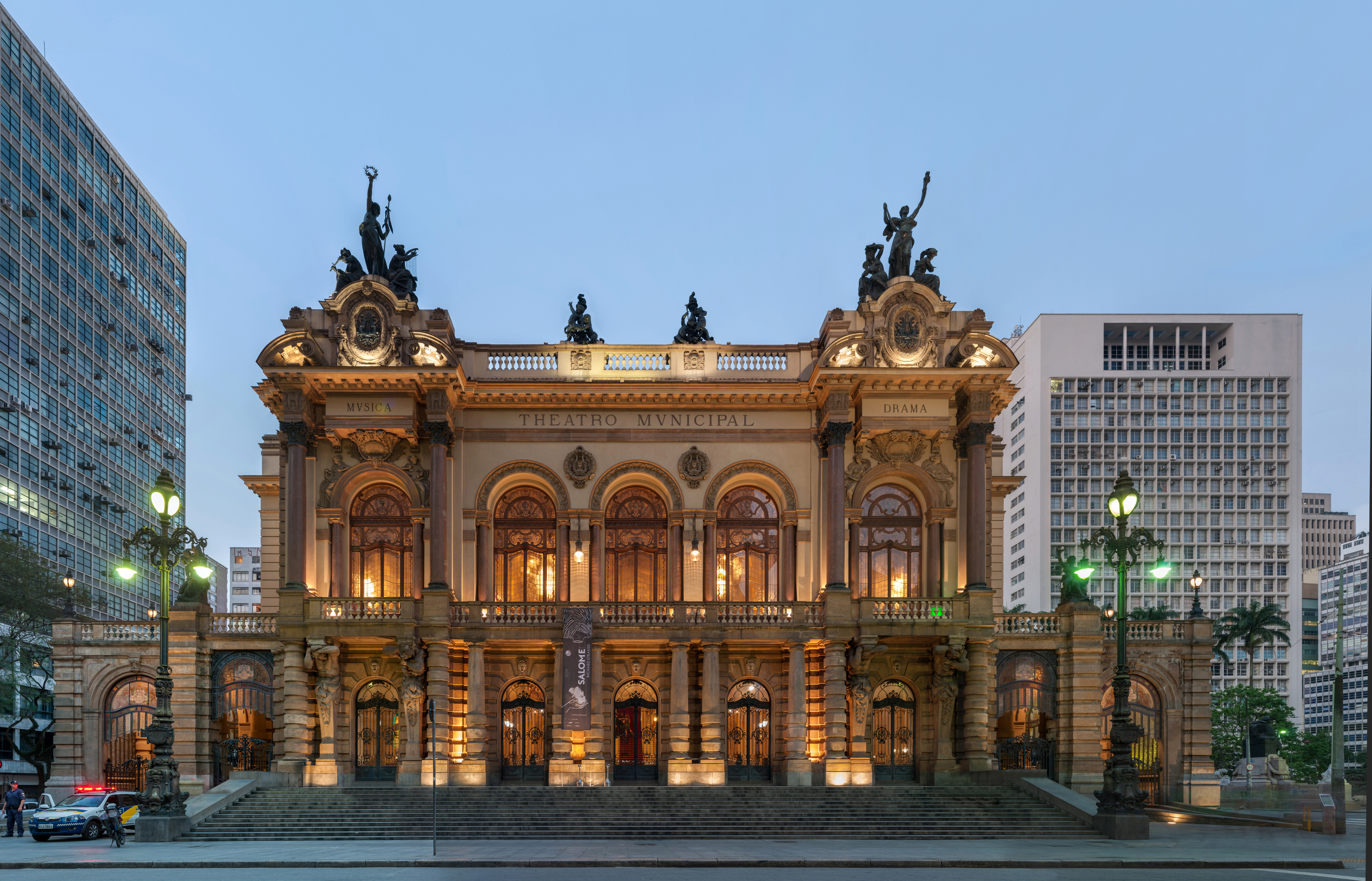
Municipal Theatre of São Paulo shows Neoclassical architecture in Brazil.

Between the 18th and 19th Century Brazilian architecture is a period that saw the introduction of more European styles to Brazil such as Neoclassical and Baroque architecture. This was usually mixed with Brazilian influences from their own heritage which produced a unique form of Brazilian architecture.

=== Baroque ===
The best examples of Baroque architecture in Brazil are found in the city of Ouro Preto where buildings start to take more ornate forms and rounded corners. Certain structures also depict painting which are incorporated into the walls. In 1980, Unesco declared the city a “world monument” with 13 churches, 11 chapels, major museums, ancient bridges, and well-preserved houses. The best preserved residence is the Casa dos Contos, built in 1780. A beige and white three-story building with a stone watering trough for horses in the back yard as well as dark flagstone cubicles where slaves lived. Today the structure is served as the office of the city's postal authorities while depicting the city's history and simplistic styles.

=== Neoclassicism ===
Neoclassicism refers back to ancient Rome and Greece by adopting their large multi story columns and grand triangular roofs. The liberal use of white soapstone, limestone, or marble are also indicators of Neoclassical buildings. Great examples lay in the city of Manaus, specifically the Theatro Amazonas . By the turn of the 20th century, the Amazonian region of Brazil began to prosper. The increasing amounts of money from exports from its rubber plantations region flourished particularly the capital city of Manaus. Wealthy rubber barons tried to recreate lavish lifestyle of European elites. In order to do so, an Opera House, the Teatro Amazonas, was built in the middle of the rainforest. The construction began in 1884 under the supervision of an Italian Architect. The roofing came from Alsace, the furniture from Paris, marble from Italy and the steel from England. The entire dome is wonderfully covered with 36,000 decorated ceramic tiles painted in the colors of the Brazilian national flag: Blue, yellow, and green.

== 20th century Brazilian architecture ==
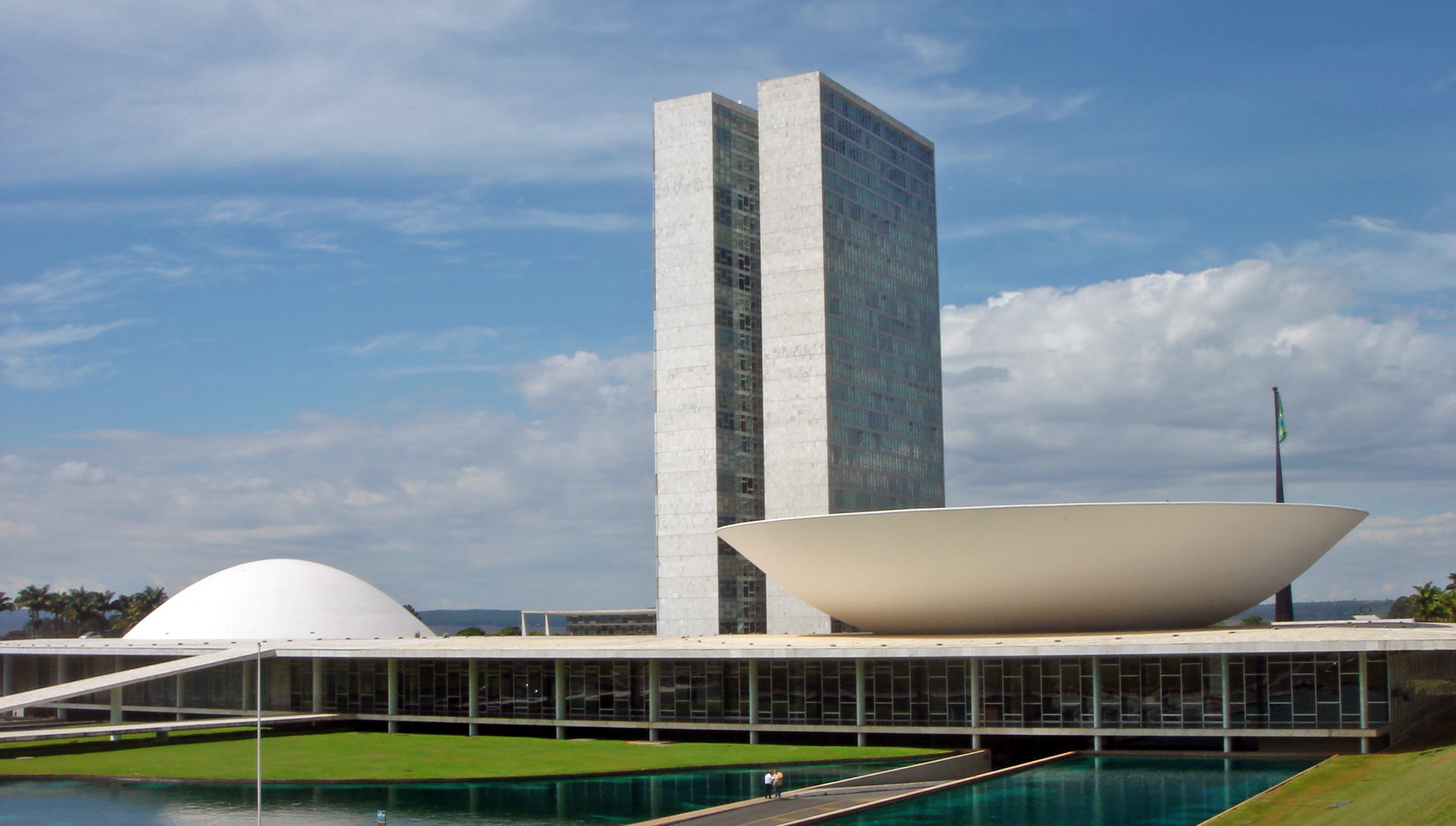
Brasília National Congress, an example of Modernist architecture.

In the 1950s Brazil decided to found a new capital city in the interior of Brazil to help develop Brazil's interior. The city was Brasília and it would see a great experiment in modernist architecture. Government buildings, churches and civic buildings would be constructed in the modernist style. Throughout the modern age, Brazil began to define itself as a county in its architecture. This was done so with the help of Brazil's most famous architect and designer, Oscar Niemeyer. He designed the Edificio Copan in São Paulo, one of Brazil's biggest cities, and the entire city of Brasília. His buildings were characterized by the use of concrete and free-flowing curves.

=== Oscar Niemeyer ===
Oscar Niemeyer in 1958

As a young man, Niemeyer worked for his father as a typographer before entering the Escola Nacional de Belas Artes. After his graduation, Niemeyer went off to work for Lúcio Costa, who was an architect from the Modernist school. In 1941, Niemeyer launched his solo career by designing multiple buildings called the Pampulha Architectural Complex in the city of Belo Horizonte. This was when Niemeyer began developing some of his well-known design trademarks such as the heavy uses of solid and an inclination towards curves. Niemeyer stated: "I consciously ignored the highly praised right angle and the rational architecture of T-squares and triangles, in order to wholeheartedly enter the world of curves and new shapes made possible by the introduction of concrete into the building process".

Interesting enough, Niemeyer was introduced in the Brazilian Communist Party during his youth years and officially joined in 1945. This became an issue for him in 1964 as the Brazilian military removed the government and viewed Niemeyer as a dangerous individual, thus ransacking his office as well. Shocked, he decided to leave the country for good and move to France, furthering his career and designs there.

Nevertheless, Niemeyer redefined architecture in Brazil by leaning away from old and European-influenced styles and creating new and aesthetic designs instead. Particularly in cities such as Brasília, where he obtained a structural solution that would distinct the city's architecture. In order to do so, he made the structures very different, where the columns became more narrow at a point where the structures would seem to barely touch the ground. As a result, Niemeyer remains one of the most well-known architects in Brazil as his structures are visited by many worldwide.

=== Presidential Palace (Palácio da Alvorada) ===
One of Niemeyer's greatest successes was the Palácio da Alvorada in Brasília. A two-story glass and concrete structure with curved supports forming the façade on all of the four walls. These walls are stretched between the supports are translucent walls of tinted glass. The nave is entered by an impressive subterranean passage rather than a conventional doorway. Thus, the Presidential Palace, along with many other of Oscar's designs drew attention to the architecture in Brazil and created a modern style for Brazil as well.

== See also ==
- Paulista School
- List of architecture schools in Brazil
- Architecture of Porto Alegre
