= Paulista School =

Modernist architectural movement in Brazil

The Paulista School (Escola Paulista, São Paulo School) , also known as Paulista Brutalism, is a movement in modern Brazilian architecture associated with architects working in São Paulo from the mid-1950s to the mid-1970s. Its principal figures include João Batista Vilanova Artigas and Paulo Mendes da Rocha.

Recurring features include exposed reinforced concrete, an emphasis on structural design, and continuous interior spaces arranged around courtyards or large central voids. The movement encompassed houses, educational buildings, recreational facilities and transport infrastructure.

== History ==
The school's development was closely connected to public building commissions and architectural education. The Action Plan of Governor Carvalho Pinto (1959-1963) commissioned schools, courthouses and other public facilities throughout São Paulo state, creating opportunities for independent architects. At the University of São Paulo, changes in architectural teaching coincided with plans for a new building for its Faculty of Architecture and Urbanism. Artigas contributed to these developments through his work as an architect, teacher and participant in professional institutions.

Residential design was another important field of experimentation. Modern houses in São Paulo's garden suburbs formed a substantial part of the work of Artigas, Mendes da Rocha, Rino Levi, Oswaldo Bratke, Carlos Millan and Joaquim Guedes. Large plots, required setbacks and landscaped open areas provided opportunities to explore the relationship between houses, gardens and sloping terrain.

== Characteristics ==
Paulista architecture frequently uses the load-bearing structure to determine a building's form. Characteristic elements include large spans, compact volumes, roofs admitting light from above, and extensive exterior walls with few openings. Inside, ramps, courtyards, gardens and interconnected levels create spatial continuity. These devices were applied across different building types, including private houses and public institutions.

The school is often contrasted with the Rio de Janeiro-based architecture associated with Oscar Niemeyer. Artigas placed particular emphasis on structural experimentation, simplified construction and open internal spaces. His concern with collective life and the social role of architecture informed the provision of spaces for meeting and interaction.

== Representative buildings ==
An early example is the gymnasium for Club Athletico Paulistano, designed in 1958 by Mendes da Rocha and João de Gennaro. Other projects associated with the movement include the Zezinho Magalhães Prado housing complex in Guarulhos, designed in 1967 by Artigas, Fábio Penteado and Mendes da Rocha.

The Faculty of Architecture and Urbanism of the University of São Paulo building, designed by Artigas with Carlos Cascaldi, became a central example of the school's architectural approach. Designed in 1961 and completed in 1969, it brought together exposed concrete construction, spatial continuity and the expression of structural form. Its architecture also embodied Artigas's ideas about architectural education.

== Terminology ==
The scope of the term Paulista School remains debated. Architectural historian Ruth Verde Zein distinguishes between Paulista Brutalist architecture and the school associated with particular architects and ideas. The categories overlap, but neither encompasses all modern architecture produced in São Paulo. Some architects whose work has been included under the label also rejected the association. The term therefore requires attention to differences between individual buildings, architects' stated positions and later historical interpretations.

== See also ==
- Architecture of Brazil
- Brutalist architecture
