= Vera Nunes =

Brazilian actress (1928–2021)

- Born: Isaura Nunes Martins Henriques; 12 August 1928; Rio de Janeiro, Brazil
- Died: 2 February 2021 (aged 92); Campinas, São Paulo, Brazil
- Occupation: Actress
- Years active: 1947–2008

Vera Nunes, stage name of Isaura Nunes Martins Henriques (12 August 1928 – 2 February 2021), was a Brazilian actress.

== Biography ==
Henriques studied accounting in her youth, although she had a passion for the arts. She became a radiographer at the age of 13 for the Ministry of Education, working alongside José Vasconcelos and Fernanda Montenegro. She spent some time in Argentina to film *No me digas adiós*, and later returned to Brazil to shoot *Falta alguém no manicômio*. She also founded a theatre company at the Teatro Cultura Artística in São Paulo.

Nunes was hired by TV Paulista in 1951, which would soon end her film career. She last appeared in a film in the 1957 flick Dorinha no soçaite, and subsequently focused on television. She married actor Altamiro Martins in 1961, who died in 2005.

Vera Nunes died in Campinas on 2 February 2021, at the age of 92.

== Filmography ==
=== Cinema ===
- Não Me Digas Adeus (1948)
- Falta Alguém no Manicômio (1948)
- Uma Luz na Estrada (1948)
- Mãe (1948)
- Também Somos Irmãos (1949)
- Pinguinho de Gente (1949)
- Garota Mineira (1950)
- Um Beijo Roubado (1950)
- Susana e o Presidente (1951)
- Presença de Anita (1951)
- Custa Pouco a Felicidade (1952)
- Armas da Vingança (1955)
- Dorinha no Soçaite (1957)
- A Quarta Parada (2003)
- Tal Pai Tal Filho (2004)
- Autofagia (2007)
- O Profeta (2008)

=== Television ===
- Grande Teatro Tupi (1952)
- Helena (1952)
- As Aventuras de Suzana (1953)
- O Casal Mais Feliz do Mundo (1955)
- Estúdio 13 (1959)
- A Ponte de Waterloo (1959)
- O Pintor e a Florista (1964)
- As minas de prata (1966)
- Os Fantoches (1967)
- Legião dos Esquecidos (1968)
- A Menina do Veleiro Azul (1969)
- Os Estranhos (1969)
- Dez Vidas (1969)
- O Meu Pé de Laranja Lima (1970)
- Um Dia, o Amor (1975)
- O Meu Pé de Laranja Lima (1980)
- Avenida Paulista (1982)
- Jogo do Amor (1985)
