= Rino Levi =

- Born: December 31, 1901; São Paulo
- Died: September 29, 1965 (aged 63); Morro do Chapéu, Bahia

Rino Levi (São Paulo, 1901 – Bahia, 1965) was a Brazilian architect important to the development of modernism in Brazil.

Levi was born to Italian Jewish parents on December 31, 1901, in São Paulo, Brazil. After graduating from Colégio Dante Alighieri in São Paulo, Levi studied in Milan and Rome under Marcello Piacentini.

Following his return to São Paulo, Levi established the firm Rino Levi Arquitetos Associados.

Levi was known for an architectural practice particularly dissociated from the construction process for his era.

In the early 1930s, Levi designed a number of modernist houses in São Paulo for Italian clients. Towards the end of the decade, Levi's practice shifted to the design of theaters, including the Cine Ufa Palace and Teatro Cultura Artistic.

Levi died on a trip to Bahia in September 1965.

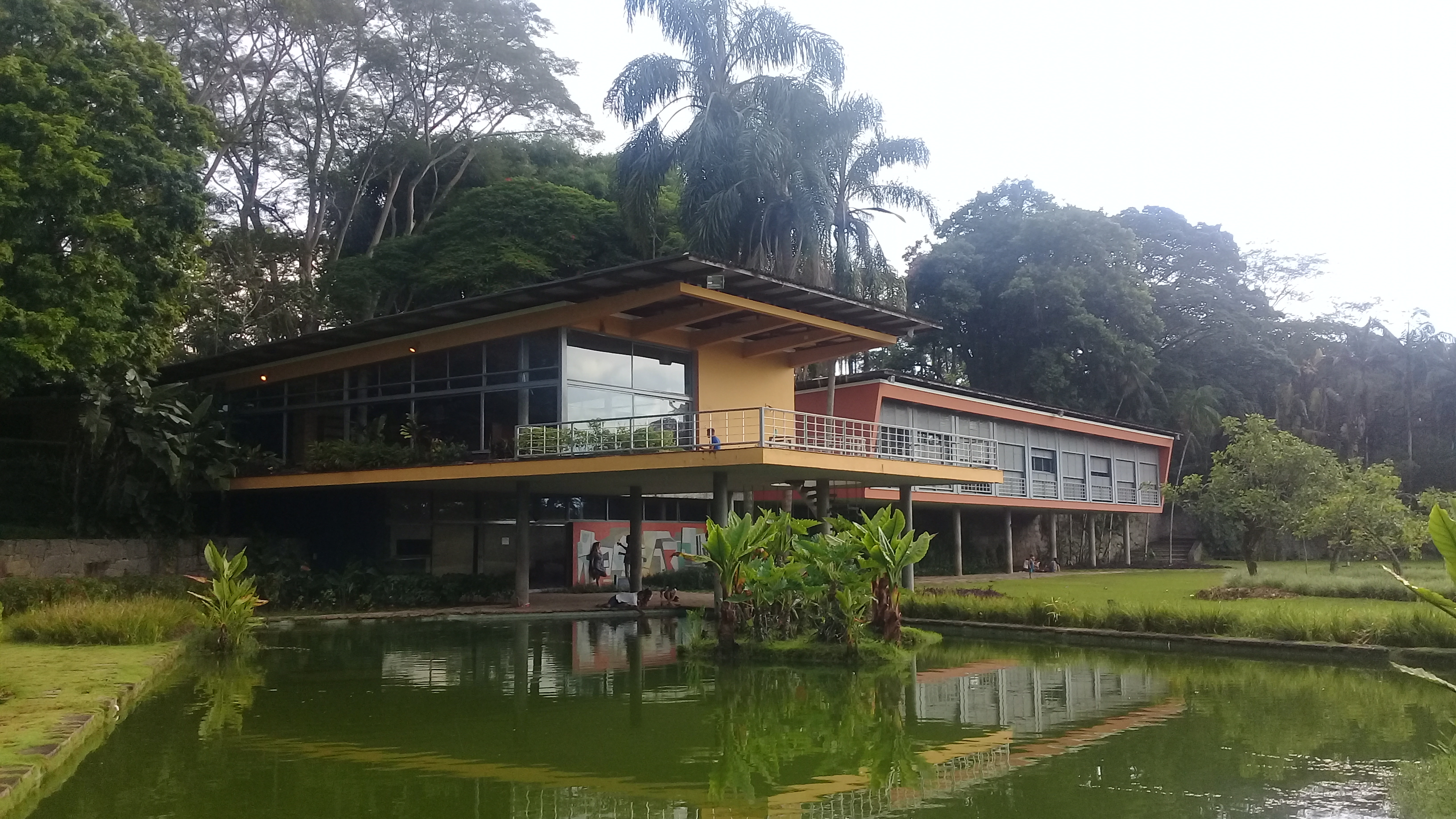
Casa Olívio Gomes, São José dos Campos (1949)

== Notable buildings ==
- Columbus building (São Paulo, 1932)
- Hotel Excelsior (São Paulo, 1943)
- Teatro Cultura Artística (São Paulo, 1947)
- Edifício Sul-Americano (São Paulo, 1961)
- Albert Einstein Israelite Hospital (1958)
