= Oca (structure) =

Brazilian indigenous housing

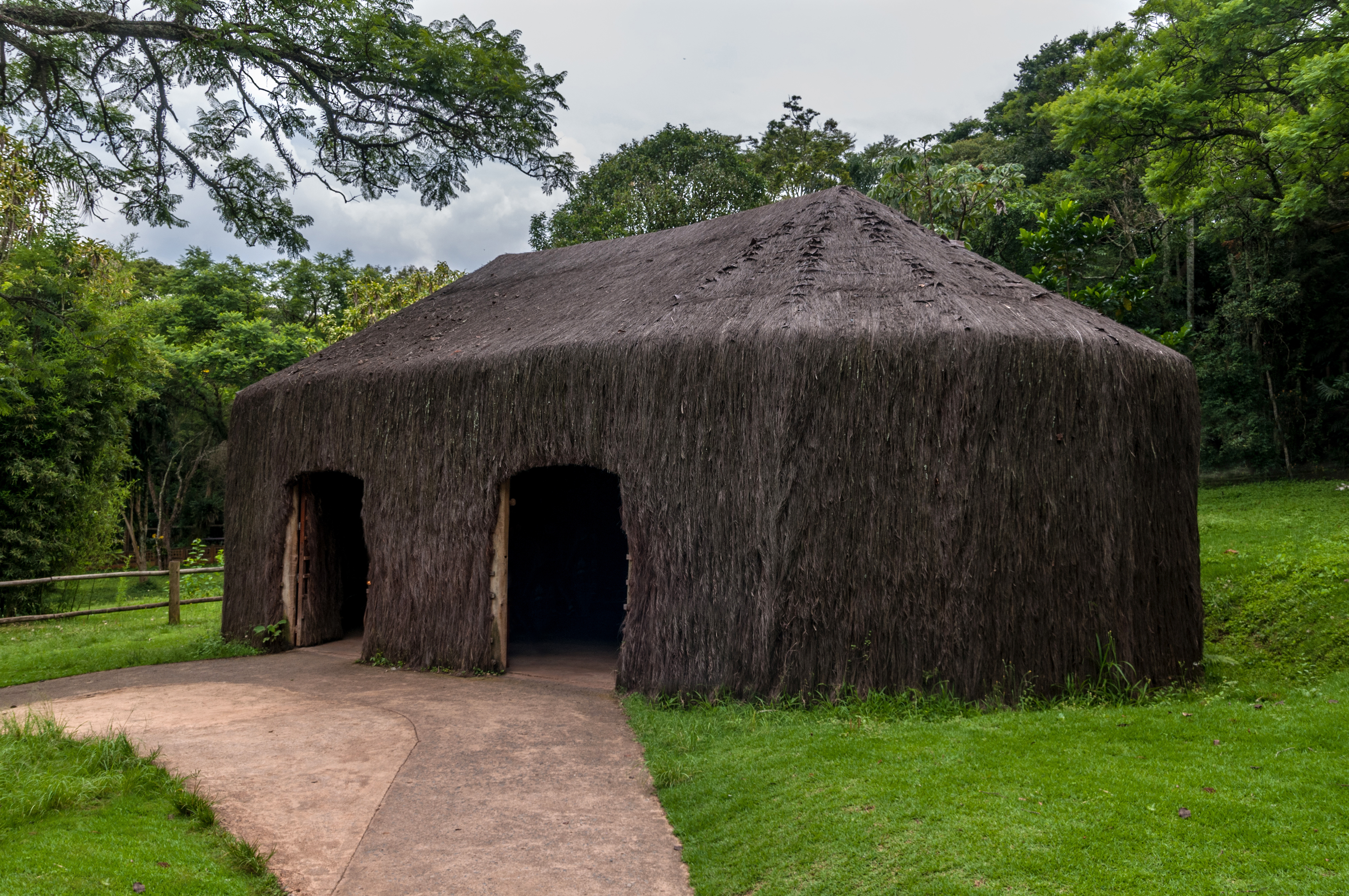
Kamaiurá oca

Oca is the name given to the typical Brazilian indigenous housing. The term comes from the Tupi-Guarani language family.

They are large buildings, serving as collective housing for several families, and may reach 40 m (130 ft) in length. They are built through joint effort over one week, with a wooden structure and bamboo and straw cover or palm leaves. They can last up to 15 years. They have no internal divisions or windows, only a few doors.

== See also ==
- Maloca
- Vernacular architecture

== References and notes ==
General

- COP8/MOP3, 16 March 2003. Amanhã, cerimônia ao pôr do sol inaugura ocas Xavante, by Marina Koçouski.
- Arte Indígena

Citations
