= Márcia de Windsor =

- Born: Márcia Couto Barreto; 3 October 1933; Ouro Preto, Minas Gerais, Brazil
- Died: 4 August 1982 (aged 48); São Paulo, Brazil
- Occupations: Actress, vedette
- Spouse(s): Arlindo Assis Montanha de Andrade (1950–1955); Jardel Filho (1964–1965)
- Children: Arlindo Barreto

Márcia Couto Barreto (3 October 1933 – 4 August 1982), better known by her stage name Márcia de Windsor, was a Brazilian actress and vedette.

== Biography ==
Windsor was born on 3 October 1933 in Ouro Preto, Minas Gerais. She is a descendent of traditional families from Ouro Preto and Diamantina. She resolved to break from family tradition at 17 years old when she decided to marry a farmer 25 years her senior in Ilhéus, Bahia. While married, she had two children: Arlindo (an actor as well, known for his role as Bozo the Clown) and Gilberto Márcio. The marriage lasted only 5 years. She would later marry actor Jardel Filho. She decided, at the end of the 1950s, to pursue an acting career after she had already moved to Rio de Janeiro.

Windsor made her debut as a vedette at a show during the reopening of Copacabana Palace in 1958 alongside Elizeth Cardoso and Consuelo Leandro. Her artistic name was adopted as a suggestion by journalist Stanislaw Ponte Preta as he mentioned to her that she reminded him of the Duchess of Windsor. On TV, she began presenting the program "Acumulada musical" alongside comedian Renato Corte Real on Record. She became known nationally for being a jury member on shows hosted by Flávio Cavalcanti and Silvio Santos, and for her work on 15 novelas that she was part of the cast.

Windsor died on 4 August 1982, the victim of a heart attack while at the Hotel San Raphael in São Paulo. She was in São Paulo to record the last episodes of the telenovela Ninho da Serpente on Band, where she played Jerusa. The night before, she took part in an episode of the program Boa Noite Brasil, where she had a weekly section titled "Meu netinho é uma graça". Her body was taken to Rio de Janeiro, where she was buried at Cemitério de São João Batista in Botafogo.

== Tributes ==
In the Santíssimo neighborhood of Rio de Janeiro, there is a plaza that bears her name.

== Filmography ==
=== Film ===
Year	Title	Role
1958	Comercial Toddy	
1962	As Sete Evas	Marlene
1964	Sangue na Madrugada	
1964	Crônica da Cidade Amada	
1967	O Mundo Alegre de Helô	Renata
1969	A um Pulo da Morte	Denise
1972	Um Crime no... Verão!	Helena
1978	A Força do Sexo	Ester

=== Television ===
Year	Title	Role
1964	O Acusador	
1965	22-2000 Cidade Aberta	
1965	TNT	Nara
1966	O Sheik de Agadir	Frieda
1967	A Sombra de Rebecca	Josui
1967	Os Fantoches	Consuelo
1968	A Última Testemunha	Estela
1969	A Menina do Veleiro Azul	Dinah
1969	Os Estranhos	Valquíria Galvão
1970	E Nós, Aonde Vamos?	Laura
1972	Bel-Ami	Lucinha
1972	Na Idade do Lobo	Consuelo
1973	Venha Ver o Sol na Estrada	Milena
1977	O Profeta	Maria Luiza
1979	Cara a Cara	Belinha
1980	Cavalo Amarelo	Joana
1981	Os Adolescentes	Raquel
1982	Ninho da Serpente	Jerusa
