= Imara Reis =

Brazilian stage, television and film actress

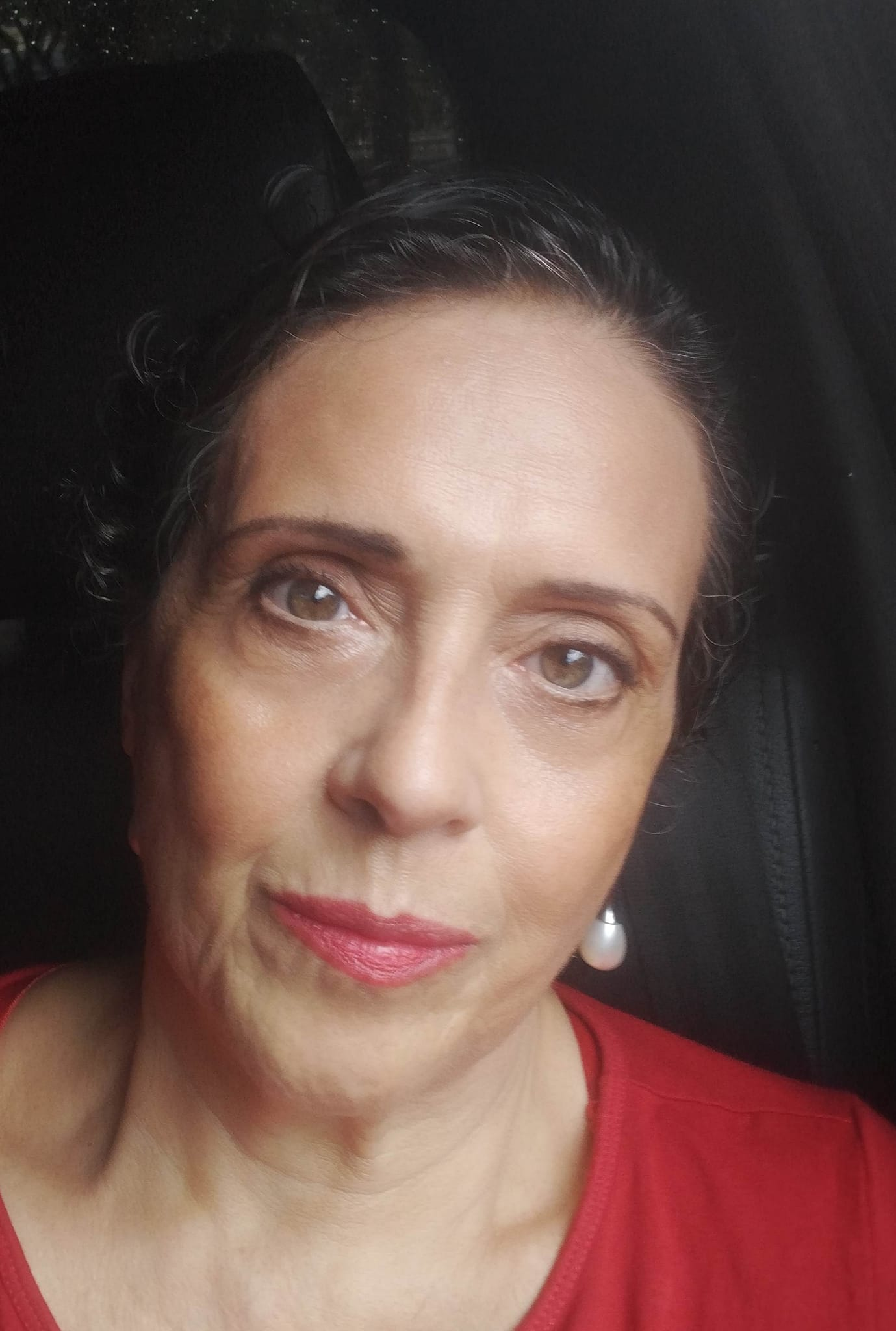
- Born: Imara dos Reis Ferreira; February 14, 1948 (age 78); Rio de Janeiro, Brazil
- Years active: 1969–present

Imara dos Reis Ferreira (born February 14, 1948) better known as Imara Reis, is a Brazilian stage, television and film actress.

== Biography ==
Imara Reis began acting on stage at Colégio Santa Marcelina. She graduated in Theater at the Universidade Federal Fluminense, where she was part of the Grupo Laboratório alongside Tonico Pereira and José Carlos Gondim.

In 1973, invited by Tonico Pereira, she became a member of Grupo Chegança, which included notable members such as Ilva Niño, Elba Ramalho, Cátia de França, and Tânia Alves.

In the late 1970s, during a trip to France, she played the role of Sílvia in her first short film of the same name, directed by Helena Rocha.

In 2010, her biography, written by Thiago Sogayar Bechara, was published by the Imprensa Oficial of the State of São Paulo.

== Filmography ==
=== Film ===
Year	Title	Role	Note
2022	O Segundo Homem	Marluce	
2018	Fica Mais Escuro Antes do Amanhecer	Neide	
2017	Magal e os Formigas	Mary	
2011	Amanhã Nunca Mais	Confeiteira	
2011	Família Vende Tudo	Eunice	
2011	Luna		short film
2009	Bodas de Papel	Dedé	
2009	A Mais Forte	Mariana	short film
2008	Onde Andará Lúcia Veiga?	Teresinha	
2008	Remissão	Dona Antônia	
2005	Impar Par		short film
2004	O Sequestro		short film
2001	Minha vida em suas mãos	Flor	
1998	A Hora Mágica	Angelita Alves	
1996	O Guarani	Laureana	
1996	Piccola Crônica		short film
1994	A Resignação		short film
1993	A Voz do Morto		short film
1991	Manobra Radical	Eunice	
1991	Mano a Mano		short film
1989	O Grande Mentecapto	Dona Pietrolina	
1989	Faca de Dois Gumes		
1988	Romance	Regina	
1988	Jardim de Alah	Neuza	
1988	Jorge, um brasileiro	Helena	
1988	Três Moedas na Fonte		short film
1987	Vera	Helena Truberg	
1987	The Lady from the Shanghai Cinema	Lili Van/Carmen/Sabrina	
1986	Filme Demência	Doris	
1986	Obscenidades	Helena	
1985	Sonho Sem Fim	Flora	
1983	Doce Delírio		
1983	Flor do Desejo	Sabrina	
1982	Retrato de uma mulher sem pudor	Ana Maria	
1981	P.S. Post Scriptum		
1979	Inquietações de uma Mulher Casada	Vera	
1978	Sílvia	Sílvia	short film

=== Television ===
Year	Title	Role	Note
2011	Força Tarefa	Maria Eduarda	1 episode
2001	O Direito de Nascer	Mercedes	
1999	Mulher		1 episode
1998	Você Decide		1 episode
1998	Chiquititas	Helena Kruger	1998–1999
1997	Os Ossos do Barão	Guilhermina	
1996	Você Decide		3 episodes
1995	A Idade da Loba	Eleonora	
1993	Contos de Verão		
1991	Salomé	Santa	
1991	Meu Marido	Carmen	
1989	Les Cavaliers aux yeux verts	Kathy	TV French MOVIE
1987	Mandala	Vera	
1982	Ninho da Serpente	Norma	
1981	Os Adolescentes	Marilu	
1979	Dinheiro Vivo	Marilu	
