= Os Fantoches =

Brazilian telenovela

- Genre: Telenovela
- Written by: Ivani Ribeiro
- Directed by: Walter Avancini
- Starring: Átila Iório; Dina Sfat; Nicette Bruno; Paulo Goulart
- Country of origin: Brazil
- Original language: Portuguese

Original release
- Network: TV Excelsior
- Release: 10 July 1966 – 26 January 1968

Os Fantoches (English: The Puppets) is a 1967 Brazilian telenovela created by Ivani Ribeiro, and starring Átila Iório.

== Plot ==
Aníbal (Átila Iório) is a millionaire, knowing that he is going to die, invites a group of relatives and friends to stay at his luxury hotel. They are all linked to a mystery of their past. Some will be rewarded with inclusion in the will; others will be punished. To know who was his real friend and who harmed him, Aníbal starts to manipulate everyone, as if they were puppets.

== Cast ==
- Átila Iório .... Aníbal
- Dina Sfat .... Laura
- Nicette Bruno .... Estela
- Paulo Goulart .... Marcos
- Flora Geny .... Nazaré
- Ivan de Albuquerque .... Gilberto
- Regina Duarte .... Bete
- Mauro Mendonça
- Elizabeth Gasper .... Simone
- Renato Master .... Victor
- Rogério Márcico
- Stênio Garcia .... Torquato
- Márcia de Windsor .... Consuelo
- Yara Lins .... Guiomar
- Lídia Costa .... Odila
- Silvio Rocha .... Nicanor
- Edgard Franco .... Joel
- Estela Gomes .... Zezé
- Vera Nunes .... Julieta
- Ayres Pinto .... Nando
- Tereza Campos .... Luisa
- Noira Mello
- Renato Júnior
