= Vilanova Artigas =

Brazilian architect

João Batista Vilanova Artigas
- Born: June 23, 1915; Curitiba, Brazil
- Died: January 12, 1985; São Paulo
- Occupation: Architect
- Practice: Vilanova Artigas
- Projects: Morumbi Stadium

João Batista Vilanova Artigas (June 23, 1915 – January 12, 1985) was a Brazilian modernist architect. Born in Curitiba, Artigas is considered one of the most important names in the architectural history of São Paulo, and the founding figure of the Paulista School.

== Life ==
Artigas attended the Polytechnic School of the University of São Paulo and after his graduation in 1937, he worked with Russian-Brazilian architect Gregori Warchavchik on the remodeling of Praça da República. From 1941 through 1947 he served as professor of aesthetics, architecture and planning, and was awarded a Guggenheim Fellowship in 1946.

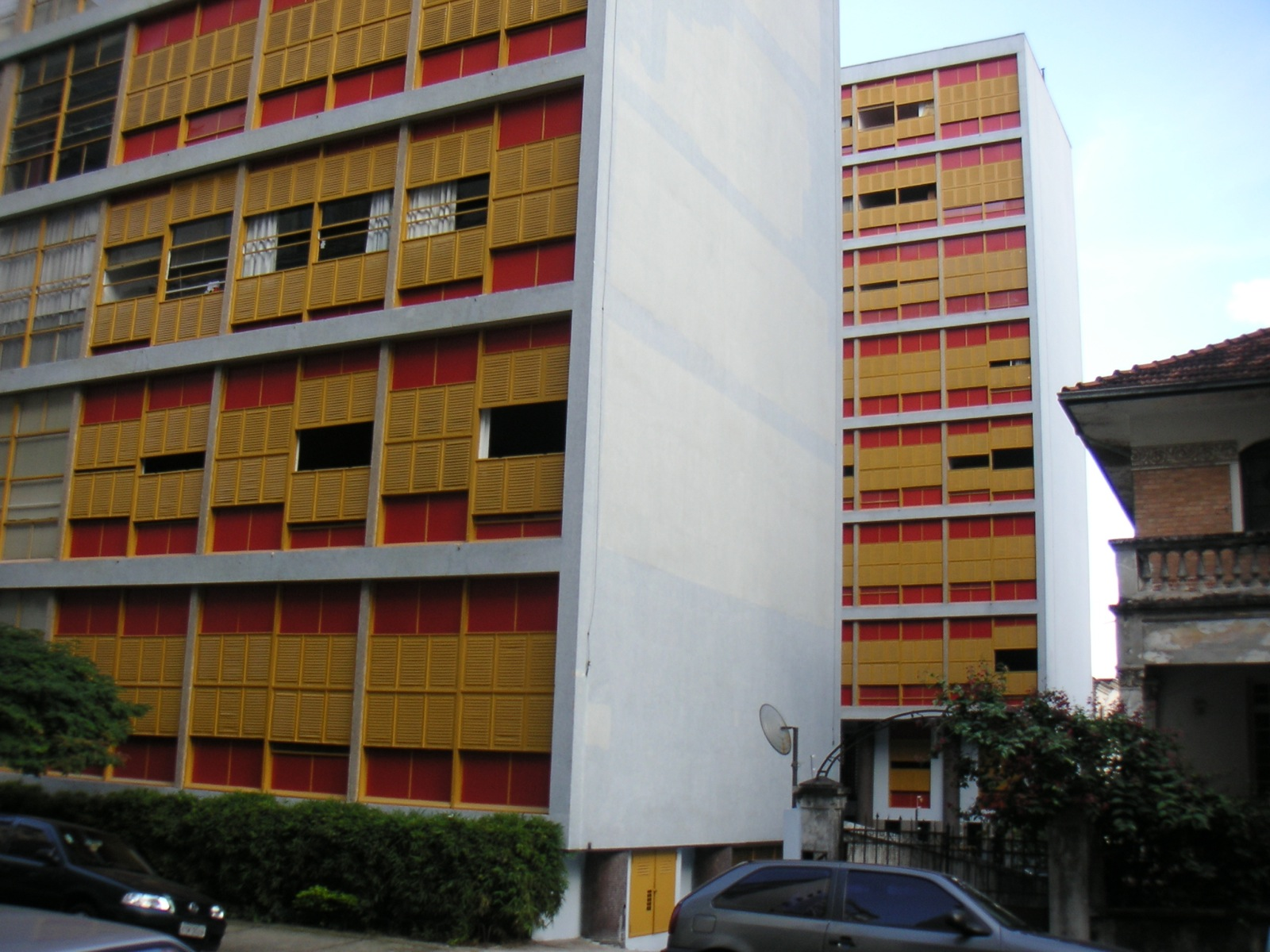
Louveira Residential Complex

Along with Paulo Mendes da Rocha, Artigas's membership in the Brazilian Communist Party resulted in his removal from his teaching position in 1969. Both were reinstated in the 1980s.

Artigas' work is common viewed in three phases. The first phrase, from 1937 through about 1945, shows an obvious influence from Frank Lloyd Wright in residential design; from 1945 through the mid-1950s there's a transitional phase adopting an International Style grammar (curtain walls, pilotis) for larger projects; and from the 1960s and 1970s his personal, dramatic style linked to Brutalism for large-scale public buildings. Artigas was one of the main figures of the Paulista School of the 1950s, characterized by expressed reinforced concrete structure.

== Significant work ==
- Benedito Levi House, São Paulo, 1945
- Artigas House, São Paulo, 1948–1949
- Louveira Residential Complex, São Paulo, 1946–1949
- Bus Station (now Art Museum), Londrina, 1951
- Estádio do Morumbi, São Paulo, 1952–1960
- Professor Jon Teodoresco State School, Itanhaém, 1960–1961
- Faculty of Architecture and Urban Planning (FAU) Center at University São Paulo, 1969

== Gallery ==
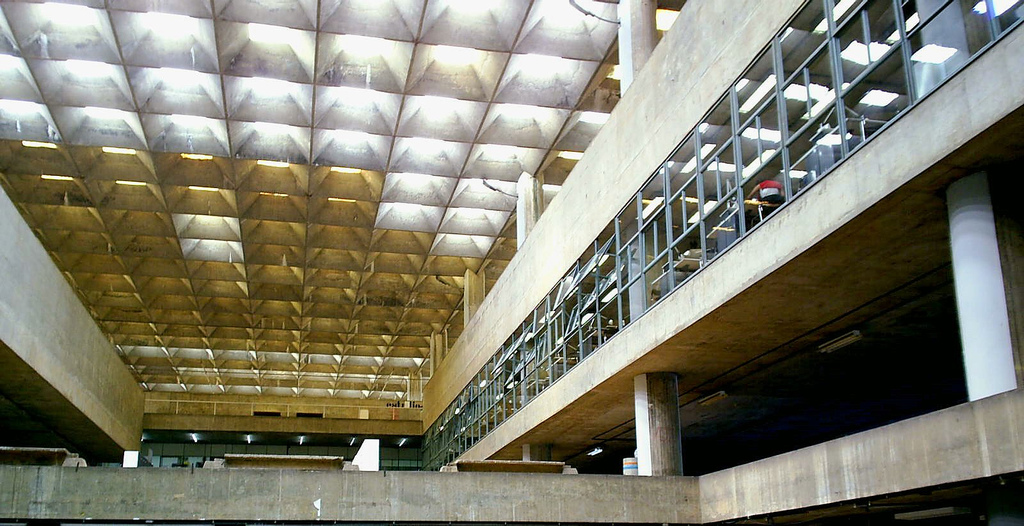
FAU Center at University São Paulo, 1969, interior

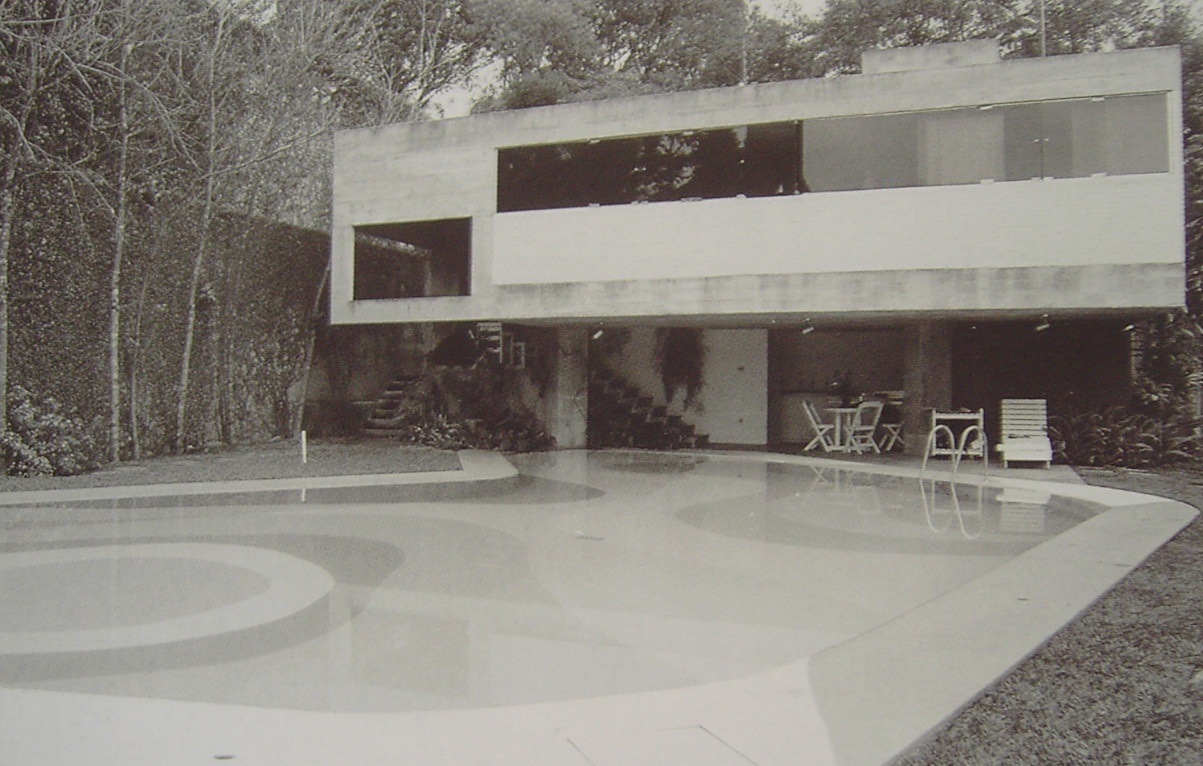
Casa Elza Berquo
