= Denise Stoklos =

Brazilian playwright (born 1950)

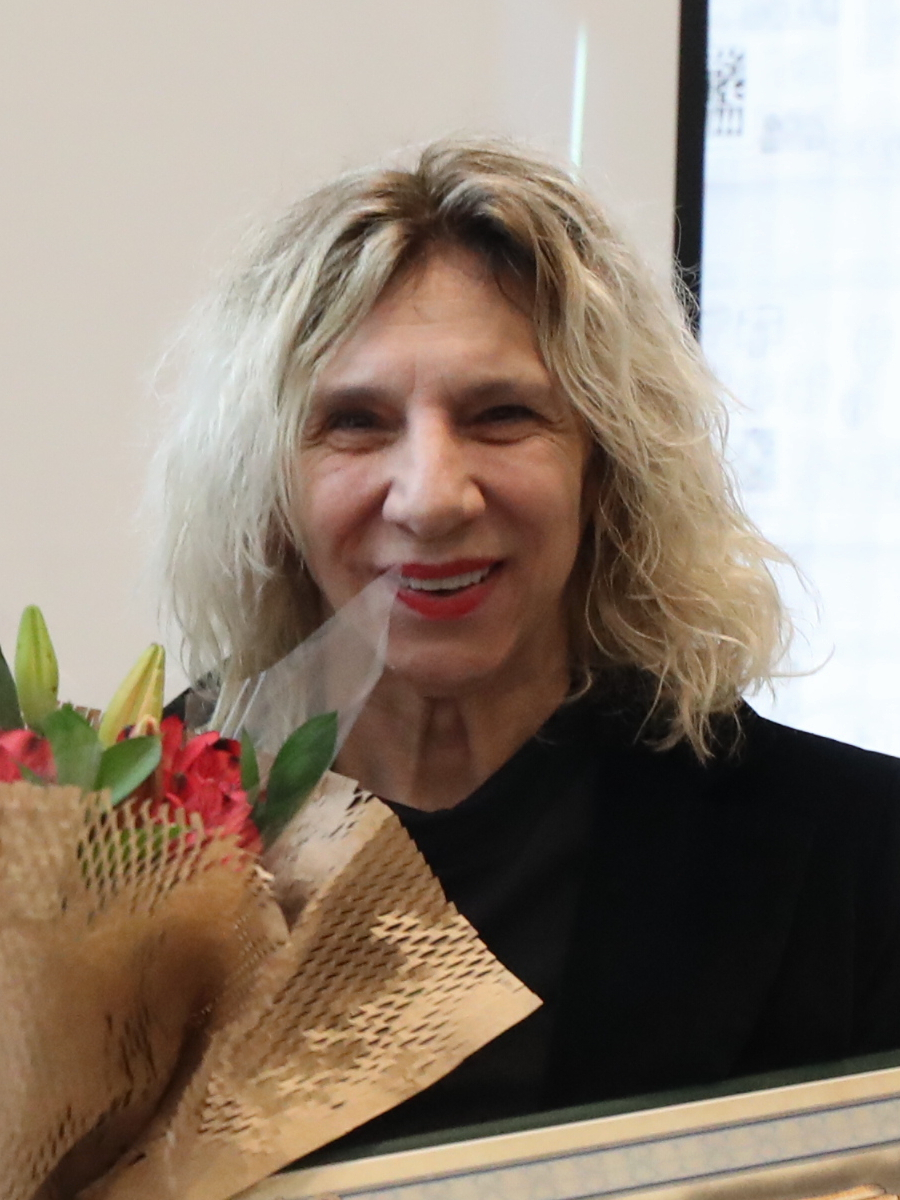
- Denise Stoklos in 2025
- Born: 14 July 1950 (age 76); Irati, Paraná, Brazil
- Education: Federal University of Paraná; Pontifical Catholic University of Paraná
- Occupations: Playwright; actress
- Children: 2
- Awards: Guggenheim Fellowship (1993)

Denise Stoklos (born 14 July 1950) is a Brazilian playwright and actress. She was awarded a Guggenheim Fellowship in 1993. She has written more than a dozen plays, most of them minimalist.

== Biography ==
Denise Stoklos was born on 14 July 1950 in Irati, Paraná. Her father worked as a film projector and film poster designer, and her paternal grandfather emigrated to the country from Ukraine. In 1971, she obtained a licentiate in social sciences from the Federal University of Paraná and a baccalaureate in journalism from the Pontifical Catholic University of Paraná.

Stoklos made her debut as a playwright with Círculo na Lua, Lama na Rua (1968). After appearing as a replacement in Arena Conta Tiradentes and Arena Conta Zumbi, she continued stage acting after moving to Rio de Janeiro in 1973, before she fled to the United Kingdom due to the military dictatorship in Brazil. Her experiences with studying acrobatics, clown performance and mime in London (Note: Her teachers were Eugenio Barba, Franki Anderson, and Desmond Jones respectively.) inspired her to produce and perform her next work Three Women in High Heels (1979) throughout Europe. In 1980, she became president of Denise Stoklos Artistic Productions. She then created Denise Stoklos: One Woman Show (1980) and Elis Regina (1982), before appearing in Um Orgasmo Adulto Escapa do Zoológico (1983), winning her the APETESP Award for Best Actress. She portrayed Oriana in the Rede Bandeirantes telenovela Ninho da Serpente.

In February 1987, she premiered her one-woman show Mary Stuart, inspired by the epoynmous Queen of Scots, at La MaMa Experimental Theatre Club in Manhattan. This brought her to international attention, and she later started holding her works' world premieres in the city. In 1993, she was awarded a Guggenheim Fellowship in playwriting. Since the 1990s, her work has shifted towards socio-political subject matter, as well as tributes to previous artists; her inspirations for such works include Jorge Luis Borges, Louise Bourgeois, Gertrude Stein, and Henry David Thoreau. She was awarded the State Order of the Pine Tree in 2012.

== Analysis ==
Diana Taylor and Roselyn Costantino called Stoklos "Brazil's most important solo performer", though they also noted that she works "at the periphery of the theatrical establishment" due to her limited acknowledgement in Brazilian theatrical histories. Stoklos self-describes her work as "essential theatre", in turn defining it as "that which has the minimum possible gestures, movements, words, wardrobe, scenery and accessories and effects. And which contains the maximum power of drama in itself". Stoklos also attributed her political critique to her intersectional experiences as a Global South woman.

== Personal life ==
She has two children, both of whom have appeared together with her in her work. She has three siblings, including the mayor of her birthplace Sérgio Stoklos.

== Credits ==
=== Playwriting ===
- Círculo na Lua, Lama na Rua (1968; as screenwriter, director, and set designer)
- Three Women in High Heels (1979)
- Elis Regina (1982)
- Mary Stuart (1987)
- Hamlet in Irati (1988)
- Casa (1990)
- 500 Years: A Fax from Denise Stoklos to Christopher Columbus (1992)
- Amanhã Será Tarde (1994)
- Elogio (1995)
- Civil Disobedience (1997)
- Vozes Dissonantes (1999)
- I Do, I Undo, I Redo: Louise Bourgeoise (2000)
- Stone Calendar

=== Acting ===
- Missa Leiga (1973, produced by Ademar Guerra
- Bonitinha, mas Ordinária (1974, directed by Antunes Filho)
- Sai de Mim Tinhoso (1976, written by Bertolt Brecht and directed by Luís Antônio Martinez Corrêa)
- Um ponto de luz (1977, by Fauzi Arap)
- Um Orgasmo Adulto Escapa do Zoológico (1983, directed by Antônio Abujamra and written by Dario Fo and Franca Rame)
