= Joaquim Guedes =

Brazilian architect

- Born: June 18, 1932; São Paulo, Brazil
- Died: July 27, 2008 (aged 76); São Paulo, Brazil
- Occupation: Architect
- Projects: Single-family houses in Caraíba, Bahia

Joaquim Manoel Guedes Sobrinho (Brazilian Portuguese pronunciation: [ʒoaˈkĩ mɐnuˈɛw ˈɡɛdʒis soˈbɾĩɲu]; June 18, 1932 – July 27, 2008) was a Brazilian architect and urban planner. Praised as one of the most important architects of his generation, he was known for rejecting formalism in favor of an architecture that responds to the needs of everyday life. Although usually associated with the Paulista School, Guedes was a critic of Oscar Niemeyer and mainstream Brazilian architecture and thus considered an 'enfant terrible' among many of his colleagues.

He inaugurated his practice in São Paulo in 1955 and worked on over 400 projects. He is best known for his single-family houses and urban projects, among them the new town of Caraíba in the State of Bahia, Brazil.

== Bibliography ==
- Junqueira, M. Joaquim Guedes. São Paulo: Cosac & Naify, 2000.
- Brazil's Modern Architecture, Edited by Elisabetta Andreoli and Adrian Fort. London: Phaidon Press, 2004.
