= Flávio Cavalcanti =

Brazilian TV presenter and journalist (1923–1986)

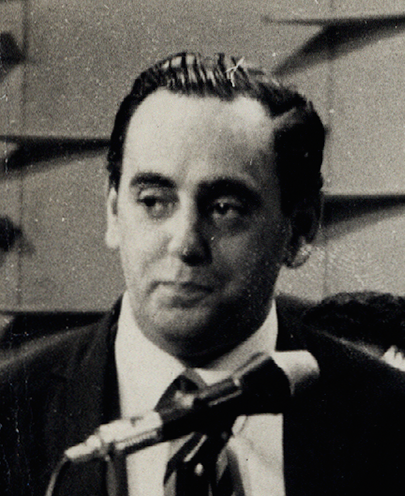
- Born: Flávio Antônio Barbosa Nogueira Cavalcanti; 15 January 1923; Rio de Janeiro, Brazil
- Died: 26 May 1986 (aged 63); São Paulo, Brazil
- Occupation: Television presenter · journalist · songwriter · music critic
- Years active: 1945–1986

Flávio Antônio Barbosa Nogueira Cavalcanti (15 January 1923 — 26 May 1986) was a Brazilian radio and television presenter, journalist, songwriter and music critic. One of the most famous and controversial Brazilian media personalities, he was successful in hosting several radio and television programs in the 1960s and 1970s, such as Programa Flávio Cavalcanti, Um Instante, Maestro! and A Grande Chance. During his life he was considered Silvio Santos' biggest rival.

Pedro Alexandre Sanches, on the Brazilian culture website Farofafá, said that Cavalcanti "was the TV presenter who represented the status quo par excellence, a role that in the following decades would be inherited by eternally youthful people like Fausto Silva, Gugu Liberato, Luciano Huck, etc. Publicly considered a reactionary and much more controversial than his successors, Flavio had a touch of the anti-Huck, as he came from journalism and not advertising, did not consider running for public office, did not live with a perpetual smile on his face and confronted the military in power after having supported the coup d'état carried out by them in 1964."

== Biography and career ==
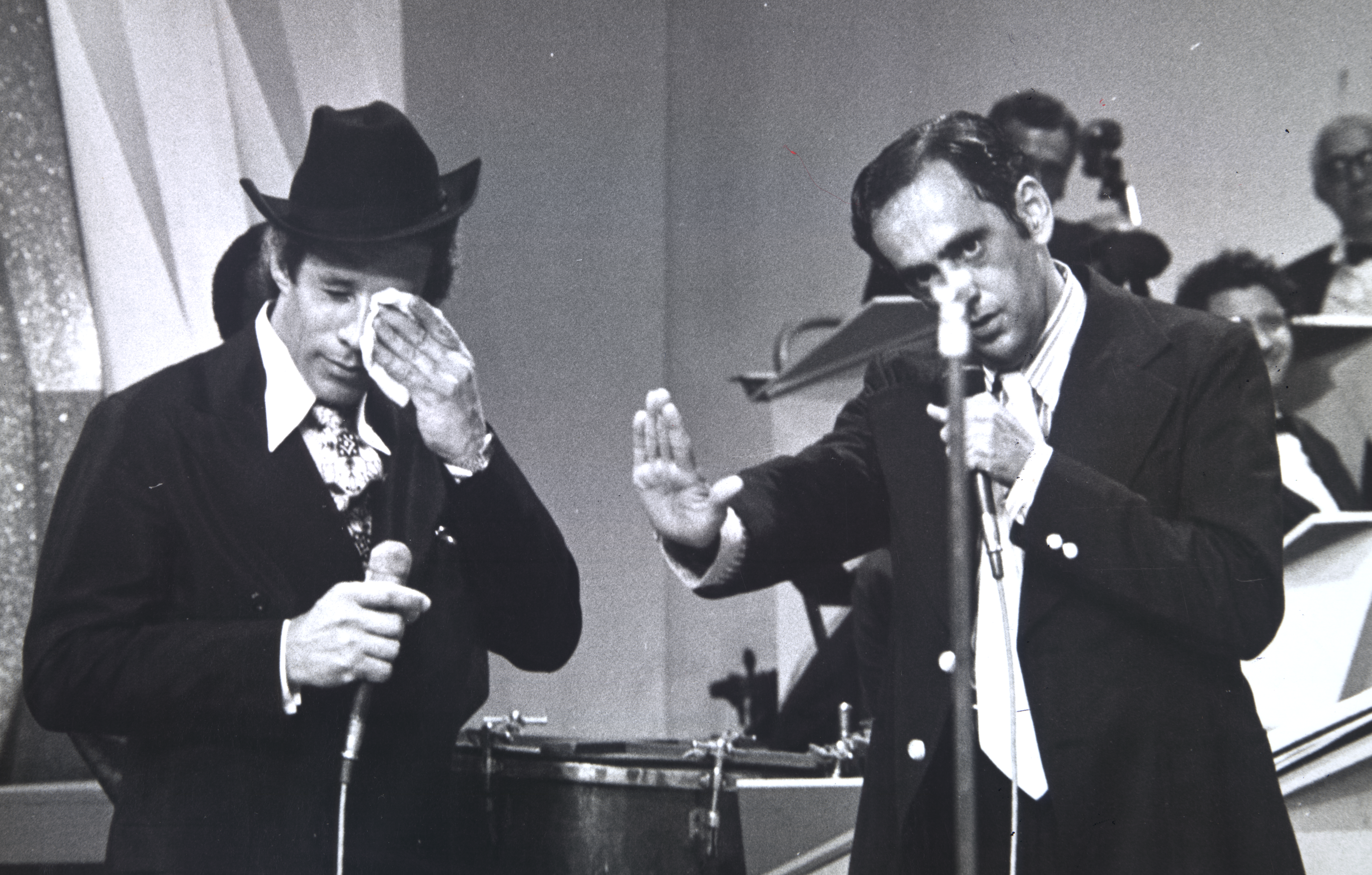
Flávio Cavalcanti (right), in the 70s, with Waldick Soriano

At the age of 22, Flávio worked at Banco do Brasil and, at the same time, as a reporter for the Rio de Janeiro newspaper A Manhã. He then worked at the Rio de Janeiro Customs Office, where he left in 1964.

In 1951, he composed his first song, "Mancha de Batom", in partnership with his brother Celso Cavalcanti, recorded by the vocal group Os Cariocas.

His first radio program was Discos Impossíveis, on Rádio Tupi, in Rio de Janeiro, which in 1952 began to be broadcast by Rádio Mayrink Veiga. At the same time, he began a friendship with Dolores Duran, who years later recorded her most famous song, "Manias", also composed by Flávio in partnership with his brother Celso Cavalcanti. Still on Rádio Mayrink Veiga, Flávio also produced, together with Jacinto de Thormes, the program Nós os Gatos, in 1955.

Flávio Cavalcanti's career in television began in 1957, with the program Um Instante, Maestro!, on TV Tupi. Shortly thereafter, he transferred to Noite de Gala, on TV Rio. At the same time, Flávio was in the United States and interviewed President John F. Kennedy at the White House in Washington, D.C.

In 1965, he moved to TV Excelsior, where he returned with his program Um Instante, Maestro!, which was re-released on TV Tupi the following year, launching two more programs on the same channel: A Grande Chance and Sua Majestade é a Lei.

In 1970, Flávio Cavalcanti debuted the Programa Flávio Cavalcanti on Rede Tupi, aired on Sundays at 6:00 p.m. It was one of the first programs to be broadcast nationwide using the satellite channel provided by Embratel, a state-owned company responsible for satellite communications in Brazil.

With financial problems already affecting Tupi, in 1976, Flávio transferred to TVS, where he once again re-edited his acclaimed program Um Instante, Maestro!. In 1978, he returned to Tupi with the Programa Flávio Cavalcanti, but on a new day, with his program being broadcast on Saturdays. Flávio remained at Tupi until the network closed in 1980.

In 1982, he went to Rede Bandeirantes to present the program Boa Noite Brasil. From 1983 until his death in 1986, he began presenting Programa Flávio Cavalcanti on SBT. His programs featured renowned names such as Osvaldo Sargentelli, Marisa Urban, Érlon Chaves, Márcia de Windsor, among others.

=== Style and opinions ===
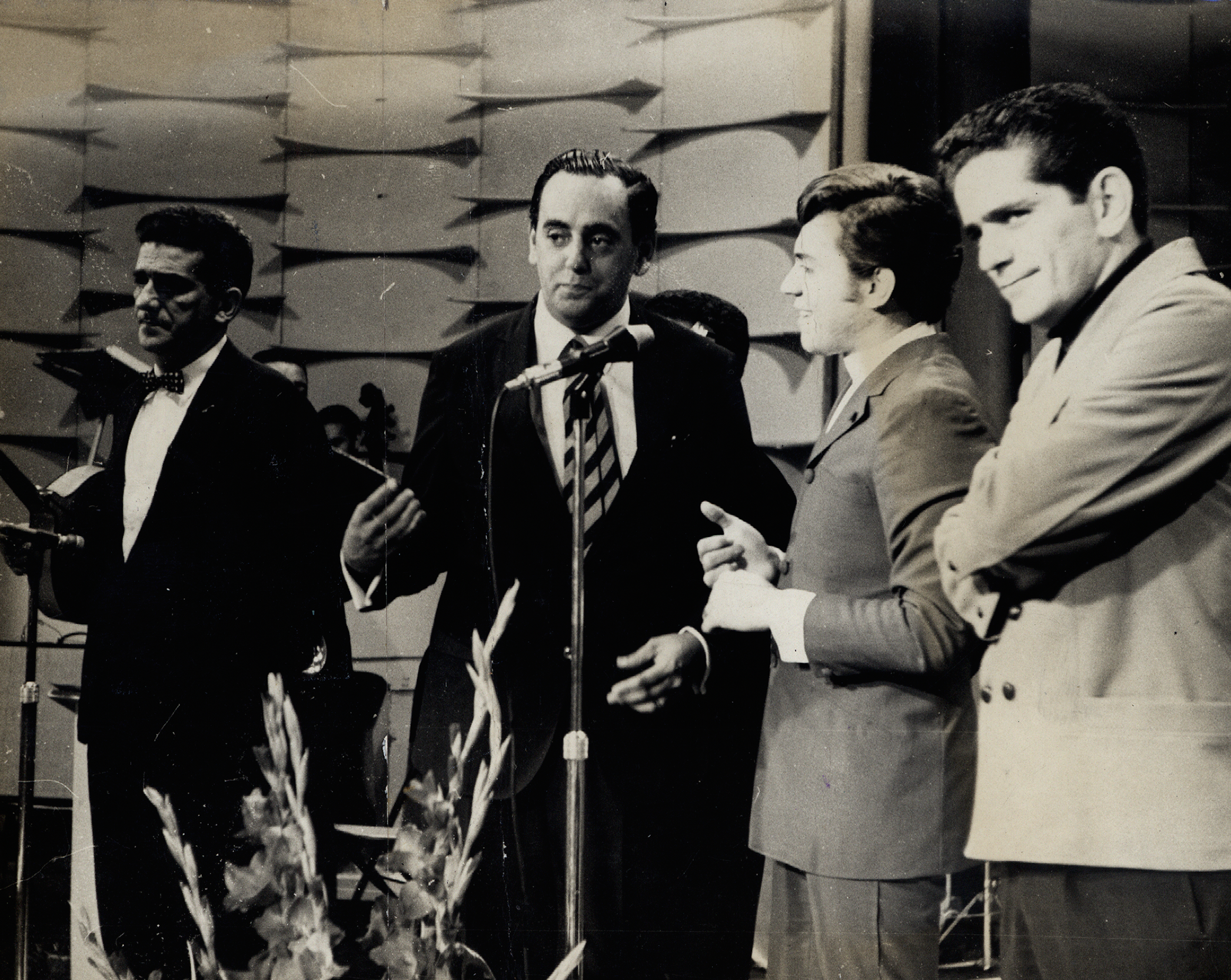
Cavalcanti on his show, with Jacob do Bandolim, Taiguara and Sérgio Bittencourt (1960s)

Flávio Cavalcanti was known for harshly criticizing artists he considered bad or whose songs were mediocre or weak on his show, even breaking their records live on air. He created striking gestures, such as his right hand extended upwards and the catchphrase "Our commercials, please!" ("Nossos comerciais, por favor!") when calling the break. He was one of the creators of the first talent show with a jury on Brazilian television, which featured names such as Chiquinho Scarpa, Jorge Kajuru and Conrado. Many famous Brazilian artists, such as Alcione, Emílio Santiago and Fafá de Belém, began their careers on Flávio Cavalcanti's programs.

Known for his conservatism, Cavalcanti supported the military coup of 1964. He even harshly criticized British musician John Lennon, believing that the then Beatles lead singer was a negative influence on young people. He was strongly against homosexuality and same-sex marriage. In 1973, Flávio had his program on Rede Tupi suspended for sixty days by federal censorship, after presenting the story of an invalid man who had "lent" his wife to his neighbor, a fact that culminated in a history of previous problems with the program's content.

=== Death ===
On 22 May 1986, Flávio Cavalcanti did a quick interview on his program and threw his index finger up in the air with his catchphrase "Nossos comerciais, por favor!". After the break, Wagner Montes replaced Flávio, announcing that he would return in the next program, which did not happen. Flávio had suffered myocardial ischemia. He died four days later, on 26 May 1986, and was buried in Petrópolis. The day after his death, SBT was off the air until the presenter's burial.
