= Emílio Santiago =

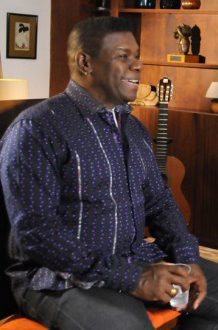

Background information
- Born: Emílio Vitalino Santiago; 6 December 1946; Rio de Janeiro, Brazil
- Died: 20 March 2013 (aged 66) Rio de Janeiro, Brazil
- Genres: Samba, Música popular brasileira, bossa nova
- Occupations: Singer, musician
- Instrument: Vocals
- Years active: 1973–2013
- Labels: CID, Philips, PolyGram, Som Livre, Sony Music Entertainment
- Website: web.archive.org/web/20241220144832/https://emiliosantiago.net//

Emílio Vitalino Santiago (6 December 1946 – 20 March 2013), known as Emílio Santiago, was a Brazilian singer.

== Biography ==
=== Early years ===
Attending college at Federal University of Rio de Janeiro Law School in the 1970s, where he graduated at the insistence of his parents, he began to sing in college festivals that same decade and participated in a program, reaching a final program Flávio Cavalcanti, in defunct TV Tupi. He worked as a crooner at Ed Lincoln orchestra, and in many performances in nightclubs and concert halls nightly.

=== Music career ===
In 1973 he released the first single for Polydor Records, with songs "Transa de amor" and "Saravá Nega", which caused major interests in radio and television programs.

The first record was released by CID in 1975, with forgotten songs of enshrined composers as Ivan Lins, João Donato, Jorge Benjor, Nelson Cavaquinho, Guilherme de Brito, Marcos Valle and Paulo Sérgio Valle, among others. He moved the following year to the Philips/Polygram, staying on this label until 1984, by which released ten albums – all with little effect. In 1985, he was chosen as the best performer in the "Festival of Festivals", TV Globo with the song "Elis, Elis".

His success actually came in 1988, when he released the LP Brazilian "Aquarela Brasileira" (Brazilian Watercolor) by Som Livre, a special project of seven volumes devoted exclusively to the repertoire of Brazilian music, the project surpassed four million copies sold. At that time, also released other special projects, as a tribute to singer Dick Farney ("Perdido de Amor" (Lost Love), 1995) or rewriting classics of Hispanic Bolero ("Dias de Luna", 1996).

He represented Brazil at the OTI Festival 1993 with the song "Essa fase do amor", placing second.

In 2000, he signed with Sony Music. The album that marks the debut on the new label is "Bossa Nova", which brought many classics of the genre and also yielded a DVD. Continued with a "Um sorriso nos lábios" (2001), a tribute to Gonzaguinha and another to João Donato in 2003.

His latest album was "O melhor das aquarelas ao vivo" (The best of watercolors live) where he revised the repertoire of Brazilian music that he recorded since the album " Aquarela Brasileira" (Brazilian Watercolour (1988). That was the first live album and second DVD of Emilio's career after "Bossa Nova" (2000).

== Death ==
Santiago suffered a stroke on March 7, 2013. At first he seemed to be responding to treatment, but his health worsened and on 20 March 2013, at 6:30 in the morning, the singer died at the age of 66 in Samaritan Hospital, Rio de Janeiro. Emílio Santiago was laid in state at the Rio de Janeiro Chamber of Councilors and was buried in the Memorial do Carmo, Rio de Janeiro, Caju, Brazil. (Port Area of Rio de Janeiro)

== Discography ==
- 1975 – Emílio Santiago
- 1976 – Brasileiríssimas
- 1977 – Comigo é assim
- 1977 – Feito pra ouvir
- 1978 – Emílio
- 1979 – O canto crescente de Emílio Santiago
- 1980 – Guerreiro coração
- 1981 – Amor de lua
- 1982 – Ensaios de amor
- 1983 – Mais que um momento
- 1984 – Tá na hora
- 1988 – Aquarela Brasileira
- 1989 – Aquarela Brasileira 2
- 1990 – Aquarela Brasileira 3
- 1991 – Aquarela Brasileira 4
- 1992 – Aquarela Brasileira 5
- 1993 – Aquarela Brasileira 6
- 1995 – Aquarela Brasileira 7
- 1995 – Perdido de amor
- 1996 – Dias de luna
- 1997 – Emílio Santiago
- 1998 – Emílio Santiago
- 1998 – Preciso dizer que te amo
- 2000 – Bossa nova
- 2001 – Um sorriso nos lábios
- 2003 – Emílio Santiago encontra João Donato
- 2005 – O melhor das Aquarelas – ao vivo
- 2007 – De um jeito differente
- 2010 – Só Danço Samba
- 2011 – Personalidade
