= Mayara Magri (actress) =

Brazilian actress

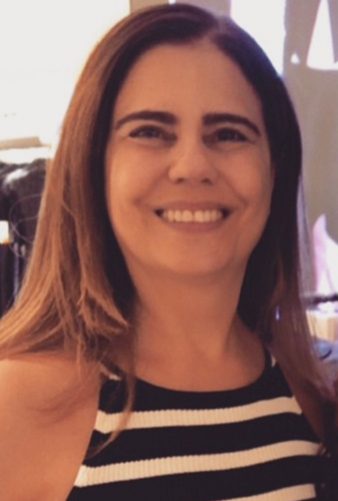
- Magri in 2015
- Born: 2 May 1962 (age 63); Mogi Guaçu, Brazil
- Occupation: Actress
- Spouse: Herval Rossano (m. 2005; died 2007)

Mayara Magri (born May 2, 1962) is a Brazilian actress.

== Personal life ==
She was married to actor and director Herval Rossano until his death in 2007. She dated actor Flávio Galvão for four years.

== Filmography ==
=== Television ===
| Year | Title | Role | Notes |
|---|---|---|---|
| 1981 | Os Adolescentes | | |
| 1982 | Ninho da Serpente | Marinalva | |
| 1983 | Sabor de Mel | Terezinha | |
| 1984 | Casal 80 | Béa | |
| 1984 | Amor com Amor Se Paga | Rosemary (Rose) | |
| 1985 | A Gata Comeu | Beatriz Penaforte (Babi) | |
| 1986 | Dona Beija | Maria Sampaio | |
| 1986 | Roda de Fogo | Helena D'Ávila Villar | |
| 1987 | Helena | Eugênia | |
| 1989 | O Salvador da Pátria | Camila Sintra | |
| 1990 | Delegacia de Mulheres | Belinha | |
| 1991 | Salomé | Mônica | |
| 1991 | O Portador | Jacira | |
| 1994 | Você Decide | Nicinha | Episode: "A Qualquer Preço" |
| 1994 | Éramos Seis | Justina | |
| 1996 | Razão de Viver | Olga | |
| 1997 | Os Ossos do Barão | Lourdes Camargo Parente Rendon Pompeo e Taques | |
| 1997 | Uma Janela para o Céu | Ângela | |
| 1997 | O Desafio de Elias | Safira | |
| 1998 | Mulher | | Special participation |
| 2004 | A Escrava Isaura | Tomásia Albuquerque (Condessa de Campos) | |
| 2009 | Toma Lá Dá Cá | Murici Chaveia | Episode: "A Bicharada em Festa" |

=== Films ===
| Year | Title | Role |
|---|---|---|
| 1983 | A Próxima Vítima | Luna |
| 1983 | Shock: Diversão Diabólica | |
| 1986 | Quero Ser Feliz | |
| 1997 | Átimo | Drica |
| 2007 | Sonho de Valsa | Stella |

=== Theater ===
- 1984 - Hamlet
- 1985 - Louco Circo do Desejo
- 1987 - Black Out
- 1992 - Luar em Preto e Branco
- 1994 - A Gaivota
- 1996 - Brasil S/A
- 1999/2000 - SOS Brasil
- 2002 - A Lista
- 2004 - Tributo a Bidu Sayão
- 2011 - As Pontes de Madison
- 2015 - Elza & Fred
