= Sociedade de Cultura Artística =

In 1912, a group of poets, journalists, musicians, lawyers, professors and businessmen founded a society to provide high culture to support São Paulo's (and Brazil's) economic development, with the promotion of evenings of music and literature.

In the beginning, there was a predominance readings and lectures by the mostrelevant writers and intellectuals of the time but later music became the focus of its activities.

Today the Sociedade de Cultura Artística promotes one of the most important classical music seasons in Brazil, with artists such as Daniel Barenboim, Yo-Yo Ma and Zubin Mehta.

Sociedade de Cultura Artística owns a venue in São Paulo, Teatro Cultura Artística, with two theatres/concert halls: Sala Esther Mesquita and Sala Rubens Sverner which was almost completely destroyed by fire in August 2008. The Society is now raising funds to complete its rebuilding, which started in March 2010.
