= Kito Junqueira =

Brazilian actor and politician (1948–2019)

Member of the Legislative Assembly of São Paulo

Personal details
- Born: Kito Junqueira; May 15, 1948 São Paulo, Brazil
- Died: August 23, 2019 (aged 71) Curitiba, Brazil
- Party: Progressistas
- Education: University of São Paulo; New York University
- Occupation: Actor; Politician

Heráclito Gomes Pizano, better known by the stage name Kito Junqueira (15 May 1948 – 23 August 2019), was a Brazilian actor and politician who served in the Legislative Assembly of São Paulo.

== Biography ==
He was born in São Paulo on 15 May 1948 and was an alumnus of University of São Paulo and New York University.

Kito Junqueira started his acting career in several telenovelas broadcast by TV Tupi, starting in 1973. Additionally he also acted in Espelho Mágico, Vereda Tropical, Pantanal, Por Amor, A Lei e o Crime, and Chamas da Vida. He also appeared several times as a guest on Você Decide. He also starred in the film Eternamente Pagú and won several awards for his performance in Bent.

Junqueira died in Curitiba of a myocardial infarction during the early hours of 23 August 2019. At the time of his death, he was preparing to rehearse for a stage production of À Flor da Pele in São Paulo. His widow, Maria Santos Pizano, hopes that Junqueira's body will be cremated.

=== Politics ===
He was elected to the Legislative Assembly of São Paulo in 1994. He was a Progressistas candidate for Parana federal deputy in 2018 Brazilian general election. He only had 706 votes in the election and was not elected.
