= Teatro Cultura Artística =

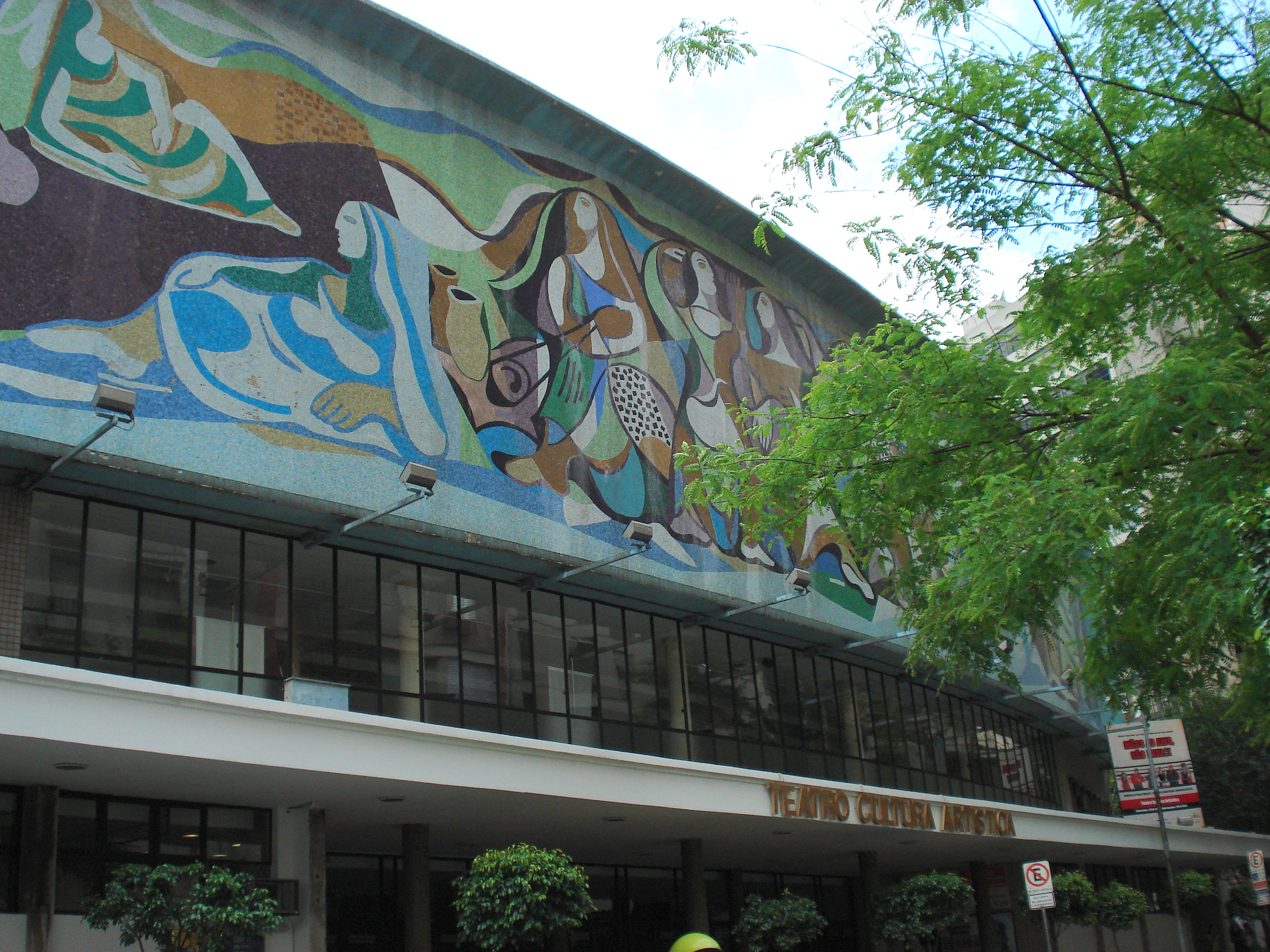
- Interactive map of Teatro Cultura Artística
- Location: São Paulo, Brazil
- Coordinates: 23°32′57″S 46°38′45″W

Since 1919, Sociedade de Cultura Artística nurtured the dream of having its own theatre in São Paulo, Brazil.

== Overview ==
This was only made possible in the late 1940s. The construction of the theatre, between the years 1947 and 1950, was a period of enormous enthusiasm. The theatre was designed by leading architects Rino Levi, Roberto Cerqueira César and Fa Pestalozzi.

The inauguration was on 8 and 9 March 1950, and was headed by two of the most important Brazilian conductors and composers. Heitor Villa-Lobos and Camargo Guarnieri led the concerts which also opened that year's season of concerts, conducting the São Paulo Symphony Orchestra and presenting their own musical creations. At that time, there were already 2500 subscribers to the season and even the large concert hall could not accommodate all subscribers in one night.

The theatre has two superposed concert halls, the first one named Sala Esther Mesquita, with 1156 seats, and the second one named Sala Rubens Sverner, with 339 seats.

== The fire ==
During the morning of August 17, 2008, a fire, started by unknown causes, burnt the theatre to ashes. Most of its installations were consumed by the fire, that lasted for about 4 hours. Esther Mesquita, the main stage, was totally destroyed. Di Cavalcanti's façade survived the incident. The rebuilding of the theatre started on 20 March 2010 and the venue is scheduled to reopen in 2012. Meanwhile, concerts and plays have been transferred to other venues.
