= Maloca =

Indigenous architecture of the Amazon, Brazil and Colombia

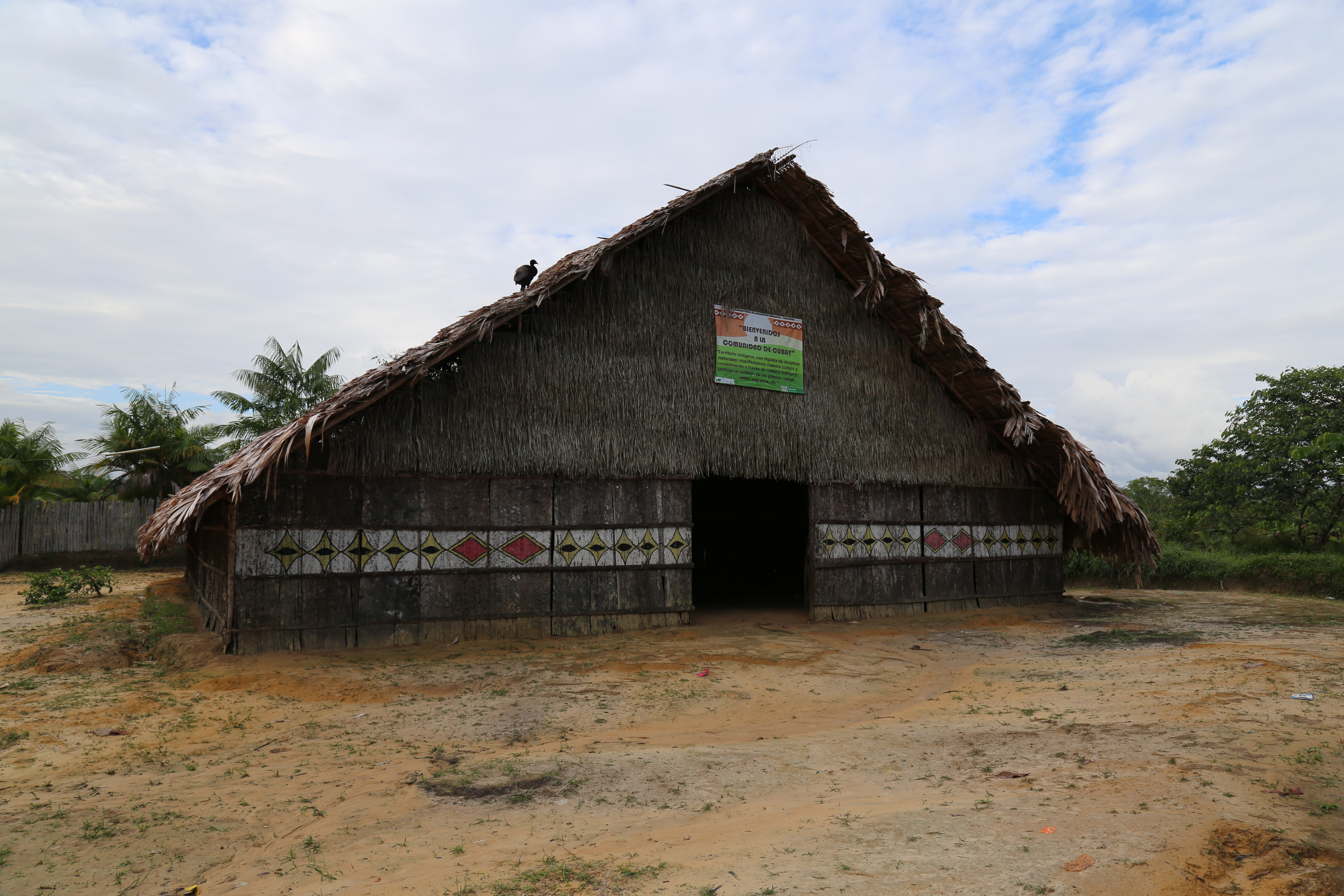
Maloca

A maloca is an ancestral long house built by Indigenous people of the Amazon, notably in Colombia and Brazil. Each community has a single maloca with its distinct characteristics.

Several families with patrilineal or matrilineal relations live together in a maloca, distributed around the long house in different compartments. In general, the chief of the local descent group lives in the compartment nearest to the back wall of the long house. As well, each family has its own hearth.

During festivals and in formal ceremonies, which involve dances for males, the long house space is rearranged; the centre of the long house is the most important area where the dance takes place. Each maloca has two entrances, one for men and one for women. Married men and women sleep together, and unmarried men and women sleep separately. A maloca is traditionally surrounded by two gardens: the inner called the kitchen gardens (growing plants such as bananas, papaya, mango, and pineapple) and the manioc gardens growing manioc (yuca).

== See also ==
- Maloca is also a synonym for malón, a Mapuche raid.
- Jesuit Missions of Chiquitos, partly inspired by indigenous architecture
