= Hugo Restrepo =

Colombian film producer, cultural critic and writer

Hugo Restrepo (1950-2026)
- Born: Medellín, Colombia
- Education: Universidad Nacional de Colombia
- Occupations: Film producer, cultural critic, writer
- Spouse: Patricia Schild (m.1992)
- Children: 1 daughter

Hugo Restrepo (1950–2026) was a Colombian film producer, writer, and cultural critic. He was known for producing the films Addictions and Subtractions (2004) and Que pase el aserrador (1984), works associated with the development of neorealism in Colombian cinema. His career spanned several decades and encompassed contributions to film production, cultural criticism, and literary writing.

Among his most acclaimed productions are Sumas y restas, Rodrigo D No Futuro, and La Vendedora de Rosas, the latter two being among the first Colombian films screened at the Cannes Film Festival. The films portrayed urban life and social marginalization and are regarded as significant works of Colombian cinema. Their themes and dialogue have had a lasting influence on Colombian popular culture.

== Biography ==
Hugo Restrepo was born on March 15, 1950, in Medellín, Colombia as one of 10 children. His father, Hugo Restrepo Sr., was a known figure in the country's public and commercial transport industry, which he helped establish in the early 20th century. His mother, Fanny, was a homemaker.

Restrepo completed his primary and secondary education at the Pontifical Bolivarian University before earning a degree in Geological Sciences and Geological Engineering from the Universidad Nacional de Colombia in Medellín. Despite his academic focus on geology, Restrepo nurtured a passion for cinema, which he shared with friends who would gather to watch, discuss, and later create films together.

After completing his studies, Restrepo faced the harsh realities of working in geology during a period marked by significant violent unrest in Colombia. In the 1980s, fieldwork in the country’s rural areas was particularly dangerous due to threats from guerrilla and insurgent groups. This environment prompted Restrepo to shift his focus from geology to cinema, a field he saw as a safer and more fulfilling career path.

His journey into film production became inseparable from his collaboration with the Colombian filmmaker Victor Gaviria. They met through a mutual friend, and at the time, Gaviria had already gained recognition for his award-winning writing. Together with Jorge Mario Vélez, Restrepo and Gaviria founded Tiempos Modernos in 1983, one of Medellín's first independent film production companies. After the sale of Tiempos Modernos, the partners went on to establish La Ducha Fría Producciones, continuing their work in Colombian cinema.

In 1992, Restrepo married lawyer Patricia Schild, and the following year, the couple welcomed their daughter. While Restrepo had long been involved in writing short stories and collaborating on the screenplays of his films, it wasn't until Sumas y restas that he officially co-authored a screenplay with Víctor Gaviria, solidifying his role as both a producer and writer in Colombian cinema.

== Audiovisual and film productions ==
Hugo Restrepo's filmography showcases his focus on social realism and urban narratives that have influenced the country's cultural landscape. His productions, many of which have received national and international acclaim, reflect his commitment to portraying the realities of life in Colombia.

=== Selected filmography and awards ===
- Sumas y Restas (2004, 35mm) This film stands as one of Restrepo’s most celebrated works, earning numerous awards, including:
  - Best Ibero-American Film, Ariel Award, Mexico (2006) (Mejor Película Iberoamericana, Premio Ariel)
  - IX Latin Film Festival, Miami, United States
  - Best Screenplay, Ibermedia, Spain
  - India Catalina, Cartagena Film Festival, Colombia
  - Premio Ópera Mayor de Cinematografía, Colombia
- La Vendedora de Rosas (1998) A powerful depiction of street life in Medellín, this film is widely regarded as a masterpiece of Colombian Neorealism.
- Rodrigo D: No Futuro (1987) One of Restrepo’s most influential films, Rodrigo D: No Futuro received the following accolades:
  - Best Film, New York Film Festival (1990)
  - Glauber Rocha Prize (International Press), Havana Film Festival (1990), Cuba
- Habitantes de la Noche (1983, 35mm) A reflective exploration of urban life, marking one of Restrepo’s earlier contributions to Colombian cinema.
- La Vieja Guardia (1985, 16mm) An evocative look at Medellín's working class, demonstrating Restrepo’s ability to blend personal and social themes.
- Que Pase el Aserrador (1985, ¾") A short yet impactful film that further solidified Restrepo’s reputation as a talented producer.
- Los Músicos (1986, 16mm) This film provides a vivid portrayal of Medellín's local musicians, blending documentary style with cinematic narrative.
- El Paseo (1988) A family-centered narrative exploring the complexities of Colombian social dynamics.
- Dario Lemus, un Retrato An intimate portrayal of the life and struggles of Dario Lemus, adding depth to Restrepo’s documentary work.
- Los Cuentos de Campo Valdés A touching exploration of folklore and tradition, highlighting Restrepo's range as a producer.
- Mamá Margarita A tribute to a key maternal figure, blending personal storytelling with larger societal themes.
- Lo que Dañaba mi Hermano era la Edad A contemplative work examining familial relationships, marked by its emotional depth.
- Los Polizones de Nueva Colonia A narrative focused on marginalized communities, continuing Restrepo’s interest in telling the stories of the overlooked.
- Mirar al Muerto por Favor A striking film that delves into mortality and human fragility, underscoring Restrepo’s thematic breadth.
- Yo te Tumbo, Tú me Tumbas A bold exploration of power dynamics and conflict, demonstrating Restrepo’s fearlessness in tackling complex subjects.

Restrepo’s body of work not only highlights his cinematic prowess but also his commitment to depicting the social and political challenges of Colombia. His films have become cultural landmarks, providing a voice to those often left out of mainstream narratives.

== Screenplays ==
- "Los músicos"
- "Sumas y restas"

== Short stories ==
- "El Ocio"
- "Los Amigos no se Compran"
- "Cucarachas en mi Cabeza"
