= 1998 Toronto International Film Festival =

Annual Canadian film festival

- Festival poster
- Opening film: The Red Violin
- Closing film: Antz
- Location: Toronto, Ontario, Canada
- Hosted by: Toronto International Film Festival Group
- No. of films: 311 films
- Festival date: September 10, 1998–September 19, 1998
- Language: English
- Website: tiff.net
- 1999 1997

The 23rd Toronto International Film Festival ran from September 10 to September 19, 1998. A total of 311 films were screened during the ten-day festival, commencing with the opening gala, The Red Violin.

== Awards ==
Award	Film	Director
People's Choice	Life Is Beautiful	Roberto Benigni
Metro Media Award	Happiness	Todd Solondz
Best Canadian Feature Film	Nô	Robert Lepage
Best Canadian First Feature Film	Last Night	Don McKellar
Best Canadian Short Film	When Ponds Freeze Over	Mary Lewis
FIPRESCI International Critics' Award	West Beirut	Ziad Doueiri
FIPRESCI International Critics' Award	Praise	John Curran

== Programme ==
=== Gala Opening Night ===
- The Red Violin by François Girard

=== Gala Closing Night ===
- Antz by Eric Darnell, Tim Johnson

=== Gala Presentations ===
- August 32nd on Earth by Denis Villeneuve
- Central Station by Walter Salles
- Dancing at Lughnasa by Pat O'Connor
- Dog Park by Bruce McCulloch
- Elizabeth by Shekhar Kapur
- Hilary and Jackie by Anand Tucker
- Judas Kiss by Sebastian Gutierrez
- The School of Flesh by Benoît Jacquot
- L.A. Without a Map by Mika Kaurismäki
- Lautrec by Roger Planchon
- Little Voice by Mark Herman
- Living Out Loud by Richard LaGravenese
- Pleasantville by Gary Ross
- A Simple Plan by Sam Raimi
- A Soldier's Sweetheart by Thomas Michael Donnelly
- Without Limits by Robert Towne

=== Special Presentations ===
- The Way We Laughed by Gianni Amelio
- Am I Beautiful? by Doris Dörrie
- Another Day in Paradise by Larry Clark
- Apt Pupil by Bryan Singer
- At Sachem Farm by John Huddles
- Down in the Delta by Maya Angelou
- Earth by Deepa Mehta
- Finding Graceland by David Winkler
- Life Is Beautiful by Roberto Benigni
- Pecker by John Waters
- Permanent Midnight by David Veloz
- Rushmore by Wes Anderson
- A Soldier's Daughter Never Cries by James Ivory
- Such a Long Journey by Sturla Gunnarsson
- Summer of the Monkeys by Michael Anderson
- The Giraffe by Dani Levy
- The Mighty by Peter Chelsom
- The Theory of Flight by Paul Greengrass
- Touch of Evil by Orson Welles
- Voleur de vie by Yves Angelo
- Wide Prairie by Oscar Grillo

=== Masters ===
- Besieged by Bernardo Bertolucci
- April by Nanni Moretti
- Clouds by Fernando E. Solanas
- Conte d'automne by Éric Rohmer
- Divine by Arturo Ripstein
- Dr. Akagi by Shōhei Imamura
- Eternity and a Day by Theo Angelopoulos
- Flowers of Shanghai by Hou Hsiao-hsien
- The General by John Boorman
- Anxiety by Manoel de Oliveira
- My Name Is Joe by Ken Loach
- Cabaret Balkan by Goran Paskaljević
- The Silence by Mohsen Makhmalbaf
- Tango by Carlos Saura
- You Laugh by Paolo and Vittorio Taviani

=== Perspective Canada ===
- 2 secondes by Manon Briand
- L'Amour L'Amour Shut the Door Por Favor by Valerie Buhagiar
- Angel Walk by Mitchell Gabourie
- Beauty Crowds Me by Julie Trimingham
- Boy Meets Girl by Jerry Ciccoritti
- Brakhage by Jim Shedden
- Bridal Path by Cynthia Roberts
- Clutch by Chris Grismer
- Cold Feet by James Allodi
- Crickets by Jane Eun-Hee Kim
- Cupid by Wrik Mead
- Les Dames du 9 by Catherine Martin
- Death Threat by Zarqa Nawaz
- Destroying Angel by Wayne Salazar, Philip Hoffman
- Dirty by Bruce Sweeney
- Echoes in the Rink: The Willie O'Ree Story by Errol Williams
- Elimination Dance by Bruce McDonald
- Elysian Fields by Leonardo Salvo
- Eve-Olve! by Sandra Law
- Extraordinary Visitor by John W. Doyle
- The Falling by Raul Sanchez Inglis
- Faultlines by Gary Popovich
- Fish Bait by Anthony Seck
- The Fisherman and His Wife by Jochen Schliessler
- The Fishing Trip by Amnon Buchbinder
- From Morning on I Waited Yesterday by Wiebke von Carolsfeld
- God Comes as a Child by Jeremiah Hayes
- Great Expectations (Not What You're Thinking) by Ann Marie Fleming
- Harlan and Fiona by Gary Yates
- The Herd by Peter Lynch
- Hustle My Crush by Heidi Gerber
- In the Future by Mike Hoolboom
- Jack and Jill by John Kalangis
- John Scott - Art & Justice by Michael McNamara
- The Last Split Second by Judith Doyle
- Last Night by Don McKellar
- Leda and the Swan by Alexandra Gill
- Le Lépidoptère by Chloë Mercier
- Let It Come Down: The Life of Paul Bowles by Jennifer Baichwal
- Mr. Aiello (La Déroute) by Paul Tana
- Michel in the Suête by Neal Livingston
- Moving Day by Chris Deacon
- Nô by Robert Lepage
- Now or Never (Aujourd'hui ou jamais) by Jean Pierre Lefebvre
- Phil Touches Flo by David Birdsell
- A Place Called Chiapas by Nettie Wild
- Rain, Drizzle and Fog by Rosemary House
- Reaction Stick by John May
- The Rogers' Cable by Jennifer Kierans
- Rupert's Land by Jonathan Tammuz
- Shoes Off! by Mark Sawers
- Shrink by Tim Hamilton
- The Sickroom by Serge Marcotte
- Sploosh by Nathan Garfinkel
- Streetheart (Le cœur au poing) by Charles Binamé
- Le Succédané by Nicolas Frichot
- Sway by Paul Carrière
- Swell by Carolynne Hew
- Under Chad Valley by Jeff Erbach
- Until I Hear From You by Daniel MacIvor
- When I Will Be Gone (L'Âge de braise) by Jacques Leduc
- When Ponds Freeze Over by Mary Lewis

=== Contemporary World Cinema ===
- À Vendre by Laetitia Masson
- All the Little Animals by Jeremy Thomas
- Bishonen by Yonfan
- Bedrooms and Hallways by Rose Troche
- The Book Of Life by Hal Hartley
- Buttoners by Petr Zelenka
- Caresses by Ventura Pons
- The Celebration by Thomas Vinterberg
- Those Who Love Me Can Take the Train by Patrice Chéreau
- Christmas in August by Hur Jin-ho
- The City by David Riker
- Claire Dolan by Lodge Kerrigan
- Clay Pigeons by David Dobkin
- Curacha - A Woman Without Rest by Chito S. Roño
- The Dance by Ágúst Guðmundsson
- Dance of Dust by Abolfazl Jalili
- Delivery of a Nation by Momir Matovic
- Desert Blue by Morgan J. Freeman
- Le Dîner de Cons by Francis Veber
- F. est un salaud by Marcel Gisler
- Fated Vocation by Nguyen Vu Chau
- Fin août, début septembre by Olivier Assayas
- Fiona by Amos Kollek
- Fire-Eater by Pirjo Honkasalo
- Full Moon Den by Karen Shakhnazarov
- Gangland by Peque Gallaga, Lore Reyes
- Happiness by Todd Solondz
- Home Fries by Dean Parisot
- The Hole by Tsai Ming-liang
- I'm Losing You by Bruce Wagner
- The Impostors by Stanley Tucci
- In That Land by Lidia Bobrova
- In the Navel of the Sea by Marilou Diaz-Abaya
- Island, Alicia by Ken Yunome
- The Inheritors by Stefan Ruzowitzky
- J'Aimerais Pas Crever Un Dimanche by Didier Le Pêcheur
- Jeanne Et Le Garçon Formidable by Olivier Ducastel, Jacques Martineau
- Jerry and Tom by Saul Rubinek
- Just One Time by Lane Janger
- The Last Contract by Kjell Sundvall
- Little Thieves, Big Thieves by Alejandro Saderman
- Little Tropikana by Daniel Díaz Torres
- Love Go Go by Chen Yu-hsun
- Love Is the Devil by John Maybury
- The Lovers of the Arctic Circle by Julio Médem
- Lucia by Don Boyd
- Luminous Motion by Bette Gordon
- The Man with Rain in His Shoes by María Ripoll
- Midnight by Walter Salles, Daniela Thomas
- Motel Erotica by Ho Ping
- My Rice Noodle Shop by Yang Xie
- Night Train by John Lynch
- No Support by Rene Castillo Rivera, Antonio Urrutia
- Notes of Love by Mimmo Calopresti
- Our Troubles Will Soon Be Over by Jorge Ramírez-Suárez
- Passion by György Fehér
- The Patriot by Paulo Thiago
- The Poet by Casey L.Y. Chan
- Rehearsal For War by Mario Martone
- The Rose Seller by Víctor Gaviria
- Run Lola Run by Tom Tykwer
- Seul Contre Tous by Gaspar Noé
- Shattered Image by Raúl Ruiz
- Snow by Eric Tretbar
- Spanish Fly by Daphna Kastner
- The Stolen Years by Fernando Colomo
- Sweet Degeneration by Lin Cheng-sheng
- This Is My Father by Paul Quinn
- Three by Carlos Siguion-Reyna
- Thursday by Skip Woods
- Titanic Town by Roger Michell
- Traffic by João Botelho
- Trance by Michael Almereyda
- Un Grand Cri D'amour by Josiane Balasko
- Under A Spell by Carlos Carrera
- Very Bad Things by Peter Berg
- La Vie Rêvée Des Anges by Erick Zonca
- Vigo by Julien Temple
- Waking Ned Devine by Kirk Jones
- Water Easy Reach by Bent Hamer
- What Farocki Taught by Jill Godmilow
- When Love Comes by Garth Maxwell
- Where the Heart Is (À la place du cœur) by Robert Guédiguian
- The Wounds by Srdjan Dragojevic

=== Discovery ===
- The Apple by Samira Makhmalbaf
- 23 by Hans-Christian Schmid
- The Adopted Son by Aktan Abdikalikov
- The Adventures of Sebastian Cole by Tod Williams
- Bombay Boys by Kaizad Gustad
- Broken Vessels by Scott Ziehl
- Following by Christopher Nolan
- Georgica by Sulev Keedus
- Get Real by Simon Shore
- Getting Off by Julie A. Lynch
- Hair Shirt by Dean Paras
- Hell's Kitchen by Tony Cinciripini
- In the Winter Dark by James Bogle
- Kenoma by Eliane Caffé
- L'arrière Pays by Jacques Nolot
- Long Time Since by Jay Anania
- Mensaka by Salvador García Ruiz
- The Pianist by Mario Gas
- Porkkaalam by Cheran
- Praise by John Curran
- Radiance by Rachel Perkins
- Rosie: The Devil In My Head by Patrice Toye
- The Shoe by Laila Pakalniņa
- The Sleepwalker by Fernando Spiner
- Sombre by Philippe Grandrieux
- Sweety Barrett by Stephen Bradley
- The Terrorist by Santosh Sivan
- Trans by Julian L. Goldberger
- Une Minute De Silence by Florent Emilio Siri
- West Beirut by Ziad Doueiri
- Windhorse by Paul Wagner

=== Planet Africa ===
- Ainsi Soit Il So Be It by Joseph Gaye Ramaka
- Babymother by Julian Henriques
- Bent Familia by Nouri Bouzid
- Corps Plongés by Raoul Peck
- Dr. Endesha Ida Mae Holland by Charles Burnett
- La Vie Sur Terre by Abderrahmane Sissako
- L'Onzième Commandement by Mama Keïta
- Mixing Nia by Alison Swan
- On The Edge by Newton I. Aduaka
- Pièces D'indentités by Mwezé Ngangura
- Secrets by Sheryl Lee Ralph
- Silmande Tourbillon by S. Pierre Yameogo
- Slam by Marc Levin
- Souko Camera Box by Issiaka Konaté
- Speak Like A Child by John Akomfrah
- Take Your Bags by Camille Billops

=== Real to Reel ===
- Angel On My Shoulder by Donna Deitch
- The Cruise by Bennett Miller
- Donald Cammell: The Ultimate Performance by Kevin Macdonald, Chris Rodley
- The Filmmaker Of The Amazon by Aurélio Michiles
- Fragments*Jerusalem by Ron Havilio
- God Said, "Ha!" by Julia Sweeney
- Megacities by Michael Glawogger
- Richard Lester! by Stacy Cochran
- State of Dogs by Peter Brosens, Dorjkhandyn Turmunkh

=== Dialogues: Talking with Pictures ===
- Gone with the Wind by Victor Fleming
- Boom! by Joseph Losey
- Charulata by Satyajit Ray
- Forty Guns by Samuel Fuller
- The Four Feathers by Zoltan Korda
- The Life and Death of Colonel Blimp by Michael Powell, Emeric Pressburger
- Nazarín by Luis Buñuel
- Othello by Orson Welles

=== New Beat of Japan ===
- After Life by Hirokazu Kore-Eda
- April Story by Shunji Iwai
- Battles Without Honor and Humanity by Kinji Fukasaku
- Beautiful Sunday by Tetsuya Nakashima
- Bullet Ballet by Shinya Tsukamoto
- Cure by Kiyoshi Kurosawa
- Detective Riko by Satoshi Isaka
- Hadashi no pikunikku by Shinobu Yaguchi
- The Goofball by Junji Sakamoto
- Happy Go Lucky by Tetsuya Nakashima
- Ikinai by Hiroshi Shimizu
- Kichiku by Kazuyoshi Kumakiri
- Muscle Influenza by Keiji Ichikawa, Ken Arima
- Paradise Sea by Koji Hagiuda
- Ping Pong Bath Station by Gen Yamakawa
- Shark Skin Man and Peach Hip Girl by Katsuhito Ishii
- Sunday Drive by Hisashi Saito
- Unlucky Monkey by Sabu
- Welcome Back, Mr. McDonald by Kōki Mitani

=== Spotlight: Darezhan Omirbaev ===
- Cardiogram by Darezhan Omirbaev
- July by Darezhan Omirbaev
- Kairat by Darezhan Omirbaev
- Killer by Darezhan Omirbaev
- Life by Darezhan Omirbaev

=== Canadian Film Centre at 10 ===
- Blood & Donuts by Holly Dale
- Dead Meat by Holly Dale
- The Feeler by Colleen Murphy
- House by Laurie Lynd
- The Making of Monsters by John Greyson
- Save My Lost Nigga Soul by Clement Virgo
- Shoemaker by Colleen Murphy
- Thirty Two Short Films About Glenn Gould by François Girard
- Zero Patience by John Greyson

=== Canadian Open Vault ===
- Goin' Down the Road by Donald Shebib

=== Midnight Madness ===
- The Acid House by Paul McGuigan
- The Bystander From Hell by Matthew Harrison
- Cascadeur - The Amber Chamber by Hardy Martins
- Hang the DJ by Marco La Villa, Mauro La Villa
- Heaven by Scott Reynolds
- I Woke Up Early The Day I Died by Arlis Iliopulos
- Mighty Peking Man by Ho Meng Hua
- Night Time by Peter Fratzscher
- Perdita Durango by Álex de la Iglesia
- Six-String Samurai by Lance Mungia
