= The Rose Seller =

- Spanish: La vendedora de rosas
- Directed by: Víctor Gaviria
- Written by: Víctor Gaviria
- Produced by: Erwin Goggel
- Starring: Lady Tabares
- Edited by: Marta Correa
- Release date: August 28, 1998 (Colombia)
- Country: Colombia
- Language: Spanish
- Budget: COP 35 million

The Rose Seller (Spanish: La vendedora de rosas) is a 1998 Colombian drama film directed by Víctor Gaviria and starring Lady Tabares. It is based both on Hans Christian Andersen's short story "The Little Match Girl" and on the life of Mónica Rodríguez, a girl the director met on the streets of Medellín and on whom he based the protagonist. The film premiered in 1998 and was part of the official selection of the 1998 Cannes Film Festival. It is considered one of the most important films of Colombian cinema and has become embedded in the country's popular culture.

== Plot ==
The film follows several young people in Medellín over two days, from the night of 23 December to the morning of 25 December. Andrea is a girl who lives with her family in Miramar, a poor neighborhood of the city. After a fight with her mother, she runs away from home to find Mónica, a girl who used to live in the neighborhood but left after her grandmother's death and now sells roses in the city center. Mónica lives surrounded by drug use and prostitution with three other girls—Diana "Cachetona", Yudy and Claudia—in a room in a boarding house. As they sell roses and roam the streets at night, the city celebrates the novena of Christmas carols.

In Miramar, a gang led by Don Héctor—including El Zarco and El Enano—robs and murders a drug user, angering Don Héctor. In the center, a drunk gives Mónica a watch, which she treasures as a gift from her late grandmother. The following day the girls return to Miramar; Andrea, facing renewed abuse at home, steals her sister's roller skates and leaves again. El Zarco tricks Mónica out of the watch, swapping it for a lesser one; when she protests he threatens her. Mónica, repeatedly confronted with attempted abuse by relatives, trades the swapped watch for fireworks.

As police close in on Don Héctor's gang over El Zarco's killings, El Zarco demands the original watch back from Mónica; unable to return it, she is beaten and threatened. That night, high on Sacol (a glue brand used as inhalant drug), Mónica returns to the ruins of her old home and hallucinates being in her grandmother's arms. There El Zarco finds and fatally stabs her; Mónica dies imagining herself embraced by her grandmother. El Zarco is in turn wounded by Don Héctor's gang and dies in a gutter.

== Cast ==
- Lady Tabares as Mónica
- Marta Correa as Yudy
- Mileider Gil as Andrea
- Diana Murillo as Diana "Cachetona"
- Liliana Giraldo as Claudia
- Álex Bedoya as Milton
- Giovanni Quiroz as Norman "El Zarco"
- Elkin "Murdoc" Vargas as Anderson
- William Blandón as "El Enano"
- John Fredy Ríos as "Choco"
- Elkin Giovanny Rodríguez as Don Héctor

== Production ==
The idea originated from Gaviria's encounter with a girl named Mónica Rodríguez at a rehabilitation institute for street children; she became the inspiration for the protagonist. After reading Andersen's "The Little Match Girl", Gaviria decided to make "an adaptation of her life and of the life of Andersen's heroine". By the time production began years later, Rodríguez was too old for the role and was made an assistant director, while her friend Lady Tabares took the lead; Rodríguez was murdered in Medellín in early 1996, aged 17, before filming began.

As in Gaviria's first feature, Rodrigo D. No Futuro, the cast were all non-professionals drawn from backgrounds similar to their characters, in pursuit of a realist tone. The film was shot over 16 weeks beginning in March 1996 on a budget of COP 35 million. During filming the production experienced violence mirroring the film's; on one occasion militia members protecting the crew were killed, and the team was temporarily expelled from the neighborhood where they were shooting.

== Aftermath of the cast ==
Several cast members later died or were imprisoned. Giovanni Quiroz ("El Zarco") was murdered in Medellín in February 2000, about a year and a half after the premiere, under circumstances that were never clarified, shortly after Gaviria had arranged a scholarship for him to study acting in Spain. Lead actress Lady Tabares was convicted in connection with a 2002 murder and sentenced to 26 years; after twelve years she was granted house arrest on 8 May 2014 and has since lived in Bello, Antioquia. Elkin Vargas was killed in a fight at 17; Álex Bedoya died of cancer before the premiere; and by 2017 John Fredy Ríos was living on the street in a wheelchair after a shooting.

== Reception and legacy ==
The Rose Seller appears on numerous lists of the most important Colombian films. In a 2015 survey of 65 film critics by Semana magazine it was chosen the third most significant film of Colombian cinema, behind The Strategy of the Snail and Confesión a Laura. Several of its lines—such as "Me la mecatié en cositas" and "Pa' qué zapatos si no hay casa"—have entered popular speech and become Internet memes.

In 2015 the real-life story of Lady Tabares was adapted into the telenovela Lady, la vendedora de rosas, broadcast by Canal RCN and starring Natalia Reyes, based on journalist Édgar Domínguez's book Lady Tabares, la niña que vendía rosas (2001). In 2017 the behind-the-scenes documentary Poner a actuar pájaros, directed by original producer Erwin Goggel, was released.

== Awards ==
The film received 14 international awards, including recognition at the Havana Film Festival (1998), Best Actress at the Cartagena Film Festival (1999), best director at the Miami Hispanic Festival (1999), the Bogotá Film Festival (1998) and the Viña del Mar Film Festival (1998). It was nominated for the Palme d'Or at the 1998 Cannes Film Festival and for the Silver Ariel for Best Ibero-American Film at the Ariel Awards (2000).
