= Hang the DJ (disambiguation) =

"Hang the DJ" is a 2017 episode of the television series Black Mirror.

Hang the DJ may also refer to:

- Hang the DJ (film), a 1998 music documentary
- The Sound of The Smiths or Hang the DJ: The Very Best of The Smiths, a 2008 compilation album

== See also ==
- "Panic" (The Smiths song), a 1986 song that features the phrase "Hang the DJ" in its lyrics
