= Television awards in Latin America =

Television awards in Latin America are or were given by several organizations for contributions in various fields of television in Latin America.

== General ==
- Platino Awards, Ibero-America's annual film awards presented by Federación Iberoamericana de Productores Cinematográficos y Audiovisuales (FIPCA), established in 2013. Includes awards for Best Miniseries or TV series, Best Actor in a Miniseries or TV series and Best Actress in a Miniseries or TV series. See Category:Platino Awards.
  - Platino Award for Best Director
  - Platino Award for Best Ibero-American Film
  - Platino Honorary Award
  - Platino Award for Best Actor
  - Platino Award for Best Actress
- Premios Aura. Annual television awards for original Spanish-language series premiered on streaming platforms. The first ceremony was held in 2024.

== Argentina ==
- Clarín Awards. Sponsored since 1998 by the Argentine newspaper Clarín. Honors Argentine achievements in entertainment, sports, literature, and advertising.
- Martín Fierro Awards. Given since 1959 by the Association of Argentine Television and Radio Journalists (APTRA).
- Tato Awards. Released since 2009 by the Cámara Argentina de Productoras Independientes de Televisión (CAPIT). The award is named after the late Tato Bores.

== Brazil ==
- Meus Prêmios Nick. Presented since 2000 by Nickelodeon (Brazil), a local version of Nickelodeon Kids' Choice Awards.
- Prêmio Extra de Televisão de melhor telenovela. Presented since 1998 by Jornal Extra, a category of the Prêmio Extra de Televisão, awarded to the best telenovela on Brazilian television.
- Troféu Imprensa. Presented annually since 1958 by Sistema Brasileiro de Televisão (SBT) to honor the best Brazilian television productions, including telenovelas.

== Chile ==
- Caleuche Awards. For the best acting performances in movies, television serials, series and miniseries, and comedies. Organized by the Corporation of Actors of Chile (Chileactores), in conjunction with VTR (telecom company).

== Colombia ==
- Cartagena Film Festival (Festival Internacional de Cine de Cartagena de Indias: FICCI). Held in Cartagena, Colombia. Promotes Colombian television series, Latin American films and short films. Founded in 1959 by Victor Nieto.
- Premios Nuestra Tierra (Our Country Award). Since 2007. Similar to the Latin Grammy Award for music, but restricted to Colombia. Includes "Best Music for TV".
- Macondo Awards

== Mexico ==
- Premios TVyNovelas. Presented since 1983 by Televisa and the magazine TVyNovelas to honor the best Mexican television productions, including telenovelas. See Category:TVyNovelas Awards.

== Paraguay ==
- Luis Alberto del Paraná Award. Presented by media business JCA Producciones for achievements in Paraguayan radio and television.

== United States ==
- Premios Juventud. Presented by the Univision television network. For young Spanish-speaking celebrities in the areas of film, music, sports, fashion, and pop culture.

== Uruguay ==
- Iris Award (Uruguay). Presented by the newspaper El País for achievements in Uruguayan radio and television.

== See also ==
- List of television awards
