= Alina Orlov =

Artist and filmmaker

- Born: Alina
- Occupations: Filmmaker, artist
- Notable work: The Cavalry
- Website: https://alinaorlov.com

Alina Orlov is an artist and filmmaker whose work spans documentary cinema and multimedia installation art. Her short film The Cavalry (2024) premiered at the Locarno Film Festival and was subsequently screened at MoMA Doc Fortnight, the Vancouver International Film Festival , Buenos Aires International Festival of Independent Cinema, and Cartagena Film Festival, among others. The film received critical attention in international media.

Orlov’s visual and installation art has been exhibited in museums and galleries internationally, including Yarat Contemporary Art Space, the Eretz Israel Museum Biennale, and Rosenfeld Gallery. Her work has been reviewed in publications such as Haaretz and TimeOut Tel Aviv. She was featured in the opening exhibition of Modi’in Visual Arts Gallery and her work has been discussed by international platforms including e-flux and Altiba9.
