= David Franzoni =

American screenwriter and film producer (born 1947)

- Born: March 4, 1947 (age 79)
- Education: University of Vermont
- Occupations: Screenwriter, producer
- Years active: 1980–present
- Awards: Academy Award for Best Picture; Gladiator (2000); BAFTA Award for Best Film; Gladiator (2000)

David Harold Franzoni (born March 4, 1947) is an American screenwriter and film producer. He conceived the story for, co-wrote and co-produced the 2000 film Gladiator, for which he was nominated for the Academy Award for Best Original Screenplay and won the Academy Award for Best Picture. His other screenplays include King Arthur (2004), Amistad (1997), and Jumpin’ Jack Flash (1986).

== Career ==
Franzoni's script for Gladiator was a revival of the sword-and-sandal genre, using characters very different from the original and drawing upon available historic and archaeological sources. He started to write the story in the 1970s, after reading the 1958 non-fiction book Those About to Die by Daniel P. Mannix, which detailed the Roman gladiatorial games.

For Amistad, Franzoni decided not to use a standard narrative, explaining, "the typical slant in this sort of film is to have the poor, chained black man arrive in the presence of the white guy, who has a good soul and fights the good faith to liberate the black man." Franzoni was also the one who convinced Steven Spielberg to direct the film.

Franzoni stated that the screenplay of King Arthur "aims more for history than myth," and again relied upon archaeological evidence in an attempt to create a more realistic human and political interpretation of the character.

== Filmography ==
| Year | Title | Writer | Producer | Director(s) | Notes |
|---|---|---|---|---|---|
| 1986 | Jumpin' Jack Flash | Yes | No | Penny Marshall | co-written with Charles Shyer, Nancy Meyers and Chris Thompson |
| 1992 | Citizen Cohn | Yes | No | Frank Pierson | television film |
| 1997 | Amistad | Yes | No | Steven Spielberg | |
| 2000 | Gladiator | Yes | Yes | Ridley Scott | co-written with John Logan and William Nicholson |
| 2004 | King Arthur | Yes | No | Antoine Fuqua | |
| 2018 | Black and White Stripes: The Juventus Story | No | Executive | La Villa Brothers | documentary film |
| 2024 | Gladiator II | No | Yes | Ridley Scott | based on characters created by |
| TBA | JSA | Yes | No | Himself | directorial debut |

== Bibliography ==
- Godawa, Brian (2011). Hollywood Worldviews: Watching Films with Wisdom & Discernment. InterVarsity Press. p. 261. ISBN 9780830869534.
- Indick, William (2004). Psychology for Screenwriters. Michael Wiese Productions. p. 304. ISBN 9781615930456.
- Raw, Laurence (28 September 2009). The Ridley Scott Encyclopedia. Scarecrow Press. p. 336. ISBN 9780810869523.
- Santas, Constantine; Wilson, James M.; Colavito, Maria; Baker, Djoymi (2014). The Encyclopedia of Epic Films. Scarecrow Press. p. 712. ISBN 9780810882485.
