= Fabio Restrepo =

Colombian actor (1959–2022)

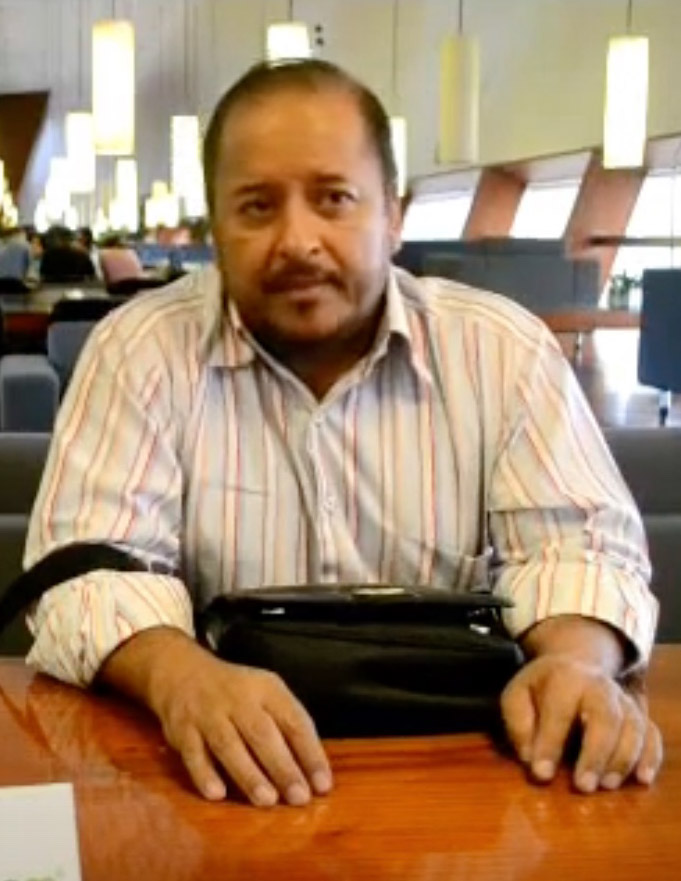
- Born: 15 August 1959; Apía, Risaralda, Colombia
- Died: 13 February 2022 (aged 62); Medellín, Colombia
- Occupation: Actor

Fabio Iván Restrepo (15 August 1959 – 13 February 2022) was a Colombian actor, known mainly for playing Gerardo in the film Sumas y restas by Víctor Gaviria and for his extensive career in film and television in Colombia.

== Career ==
Restrepo worked as a taxi driver in the city of Medellín when he was discovered by director Víctor Gaviria, who offered him a leading role in his film Sumas y restas. In the 2004 film, he played a drug trafficker named Gerardo. His role earned him the recognition of specialized critics, who praised his naturalness when acting. This fact led him to be selected in a similar role in the TV series Sin tetas no hay paraíso, where he played a drug trafficker named Marcial. From then on, the actor became a recognized face of Colombian television, acting in numerous productions such as Rosario Tijeras (2010), Pablo Escobar, The Drug Lord (2012), Lady, la vendedora de rosas (2015) and Anónima (2015). He also appeared in film productions such as Satanás (2007), Garcia (2010), Edificio Royal (2012) and Talento millonario (2017).

== Illness and death ==
Restrepo was hospitalized in the ICU of the Sagrado Corazón Clinic in Medellín on 23 December 2021, after testing positive for COVID-19, a disease that worsened because he was diabetic and hypertensive, causing pneumonia. This led to his death on 13 February 2022, at the age of 62. His son, actor Andrés Restrepo, also died on 23 January from COVID-19.

== Filmography ==
=== Television ===
- Enfermeras (2019)
- HKO 1947 La popular (2019) — Cipriano Mejía
- Surviving Escobar: Alias JJ (2017) — Alirio Sandoval
- Blanca (2016) — Don Gerardo
- Anónima (2016)
- Lady, la vendedora de rosas (2015) — Don Elmer
- En la boca del lobo (2014) — Flavio Escolar
- La selección (2013) — Juan Alberto Higuita
- Pablo Escobar, The Drug Lord (2012) — Javier Ortiz (Jairo Ortega Ramírez)
- La ruta blanca (2012) — Fermin
- La bruja (2011) — Alcalde
- Rosario Tijeras (2010)
- Tiempo final (2008)
- Plan América (2008) — Wilson Maldonado
- Sin tetas no hay paraíso (2006) — Marcial

=== Film ===
- Caballo de acero (2018) — Carlos Santamaria
- Talento millonario (2017) — Francisco Reyes
- ¿En dónde están los ladrones? (2017) — Tenorio
- Usted no sabe quién soy yo Parte II (2017) — Justo
- Revenge Strategy (2016) — Miguel
- Edificio Royal (2012)
- Chocó (2012) — Ramiro
- García (2010) — Gomez
- Sin tetas no hay paraíso (2010) — Marcial
- Satanás (2007) — Compinche taxista
- Rosario Tijeras (2005) — Taxista
- Sumas y restas (2004) — Gerardo "Reblujo"
