= Prêmio Extra de Televisão de melhor telenovela =

- Awarded for: Best Telenovela
- Country: Brazil
- Presented by: Jornal Extra
- First award: 1998
- Currently held by: Êta Mundo Bom! (2016)

The Prêmio Extra de Televisão de melhor telenovela (English: Extra Television Awards for Best Telenovela) is a category of the Prêmio Extra de Televisão, awarded to the best telenovela on Brazilian television.

== Winner ==
=== 1998–2008 ===
- 1998 – Torre de Babel, by Silvio de Abreu
- 1999 – Terra Nostra, by Benedito Ruy Barbosa
- 2000 – Laços de Família, by Manoel Carlos
- 2001 – Presença de Anita, by Manoel Carlos
- 2002 – O Clone, by Glória Perez
- 2003 – Mulheres Apaixonadas, by Manoel Carlos
- 2004 – Celebridade, by Gilberto Braga
- 2005 – América, by Glória Perez
- 2006 – Páginas da Vida, by Manoel Carlos
- 2007 – Paraíso Tropical, by Gilberto Braga and Ricardo Linhares
- 2008 – A Favorita, by João Emanuel Carneiro

=== 2009–present ===
- 2009 – Caminho das Índias, by Glória Perez
  - Bela, a Feia, by Gisele Joras
  - Caras & Bocas, by Walcyr Carrasco
  - Paraíso, by Edmara Barbosa
  - Poder Paralelo, by Lauro César Muniz
  - Três Irmãs, by Antônio Calmon
- 2010 – Passione, by Sílvio de Abreu
  - Ti Ti Ti, by Maria Adelaide Amaral
  - Viver a Vida, by Manoel Carlos
  - Escrito nas Estrelas, by Elizabeth Jhin
  - Cama de Gato, by Duca Rachid and Thelma Guedes
  - Ribeirão do Tempo, by Marcílio Moraes
- 2011 – Cordel Encantado, by Duca Rachid and Thelma Guedes
  - Araguaia, by Walther Negrão
  - Insensato Coração, by Gilberto Braga and Ricardo Linhares
  - Morde & Assopra, by Walcyr Carrasco
  - O Astro, by Alcides Nogueira and Geraldo Carneiro
  - Rebelde, by Margareth Boury
- 2012 – Avenida Brasil, by João Emanuel Carneiro
  - Amor Eterno Amor, by Elizabeth Jhin
  - A Vida da Gente, by Lícia Manzo
  - Cheias de Charme, by Filipe Miguez and Izabel de Oliveira
  - Fina Estampa, by Aguinaldo Silva
  - Gabriela, by Walcyr Carrasco
- 2013 – Amor à Vida, by Walcyr Carrasco
  - Flor do Caribe, by Walther Negrão
  - Lado a Lado, by João Ximenes Braga and Claudia Lage
  - Salve Jorge, by Glória Perez
  - Sangue Bom, by Maria Adelaide Amaral and Vincent Villari
  - Saramandaia, by Ricardo Linhares
- 2014 – Império, by Aguinaldo Silva
  - Boogie Oogie, by Rui Vilhena
  - Em Família, by Manoel Carlos
  - Joia Rara, by Duca Rachid and Thelma Guedes
  - Meu Pedacinho de Chão, by Benedito Ruy Barbosa
  - O Rebu, by George Moura and Sérgio Goldenberg
- 2015 – Verdades Secretas, by Walcyr Carrasco
  - Além do Tempo, by Elizabeth Jhin
  - A Regra do Jogo, by João Emanuel Carneiro
  - Babilônia, by Gilberto Braga, Ricardo Linhares and João Ximenes Braga
  - Os Dez Mandamentos, by Vívian de Oliveira
  - Sete Vidas, by Lícia Manzo
- 2016 – Êta Mundo Bom!, by Walcyr Carrasco
  - Escrava Mãe, by Gustavo Reiz
  - Haja Coração, by Daniel Ortiz
  - Liberdade, Liberdade, by Mário Teixeira
  - Totalmente Demais, by Rosane Svartman and Paulo Halm
  - Velho Chico, by Benedito Ruy Barbosa and Edmara Barbosa

== See also ==
- Latin American television awards
