= Sumas y restas =

Sumas y Restas
- Theatrical release poster
- Directed by: Víctor Gaviria
- Screenplay by: Víctor Gaviria; Hugo Restrepo
- Produced by: Coproducción Colombia-España; Latin Cinema Group / La Ducha Fría Producciones / Latino Films / A. T. P. P. Producciones
- Starring: Juan Uribe; Fabio Restrepo; Alonso Arias; María Isabel Gaviria; Fredy York Monsalve; Ana María Naranjo; José Rincón
- Cinematography: Rodrigo Lalinde
- Edited by: Victor Garcia; Raúl Arango; Víctor Gaviria; Hugo Restrepo
- Music by: Víctor García
- Distributed by: Latino Films
- Release date: 23 September 2004
- Running time: 108 minutes
- Country: Colombia
- Language: Spanish

Sumas y Restas (English: Additions and Subtractions) is a 2004 Colombian drama film directed and co-written by Víctor Gaviria. The plot follows a young real estate developer who ventures into cocaine trafficking lured by the opportunity of making quick money, but his life descends in a spiral of drugs and violence. As he did in his previous films, Víctor Gaviria opted to cast non-professional actors.

== Plot ==
Santiago is a young engineer who owns a prosperous company as a real estate developer. With a wife who loves him and a baby boy, Santiago enjoys a comfortable life between an apartment in Medellin and a large recreational farmhouse in the countryside. In 1984, cocaine trafficking is rampant and many of those who buy the properties built by Santiago are drug dealers laundering money. Facing a shortage of cash needed to complete his latest building project, Santiago asks for a loan form his father, owner of a transport company, but his old man cannot provide any financial help then due to a case of land piracy in his company. During a party with friends at his farmhouse, Santiago is lured to get the money he needs from one of his friends who is a wealthy drug dealer. Although enamored by the heavy partying, money and drugs that come with the business, Santiago is initially reluctant to get involved in dealing with drugs.

One of Santiago's childhood friends, nicknamed 'El Duende' (the goblin), introduces Santiago to Gerardo, a humble, but increasingly wealthy man whose front business is a mechanic's shop and son of one of the former employees of his father. In reality, Gerardo is making a fortune with a secret laboratory preparing cocaine's paste. Gerardo has many contacts in the rural region of Frontino, Antioquia were the authorities turn a blind eye to his rustic laboratory to process cocaine.

Gerardo takes Santiago to his laboratory and makes him business partner. He not only can use Santiago's trucks to transport the chemicals needed to process cocaine, but wants to sell the drug to Santiago's drug-dealers friends who transport the drug to the United States. Lured to the temptation of easy money and heavy partying, Santiago gets increasingly involved in cocaine tracking. Gerardo, a man with no education and of cultural background with little in common with Santiago is nevertheless charismatic and offers him a warm friendship, money, decadent parties, easy women, alcohol and drugs. However, all this weakens the relationship between Santiago and his family

Santiago involvement in drug-trafficking increases. One of his contacts, a powerful drug dealer, nicknamed 'El Primo', buys the cocaine produced by Gerardo to send it to the US in a deal in which Santiago has heavily invested. The transaction fails miserably. Once in the USA the cocaine is revealed to be of very low quality. Santiago is made responsible for the failure by both parties, El Primo and Gerardo, who also blame each other.

Gerardo also experiences a personal tragedy. He always had a soft spot for his younger brother, Alberto nicknamed 'Petroleum', an aimless young man and drug addict. While buying milk with his wife for their baby, he has an argument with some neighborhood hitmen who follow Alberto and kill him while he tries to change a flat tire.

Santiago's wife, Paula, worries about her husband with his frequent absences from home and incremental alcohol and drug use. Paula confronts Santiago and he promises her to put his act together and put an end to his dark dealings. This makes Santiago avoid going to Alberto's funeral which Gerardo resents. As he faces increasingly pressure from Gerardo, who has lost his drug laboratory, Santiago tries to get to an agreement with the drug dealers since the drug shipment had arrived in poor condition to United States for its low purity, but he is kidnapped and he is only released when his family pays a big ransom for his freedom.

Free, but with his own personal fortune lost, Santiago, in secret compliance with El Primo, visits Gerardo for a last time. Santiago asks Gerardo for money still owed to him and for the truck he loaned him. They meet at a restaurant. Gerardo abruptly dismisses Santiago's claims. As Santiago leaves the restaurant humiliated by Gerardo's diatribe, Gerardo is killed inside the restaurant by hit men hired by el primo. Knowing as Gerardo was behind Santiago's kidnapping, Santiago lured him to his death.

== Cast ==
- Juan Carlos Uribe as Santiago Restrepo
- Fabio Restrepo as Gerardo
- María Isabel Gaviria as Paula
- Fredy York Monsalve as El Duende
- José Roberto Rincón as Leopoldo
- Juan Felipe Jiménez as El Peludo
- Carlos Arturo Valencia as El Primo

== Awards ==
- Cartagena Film Festival: Best film, best director and best supporting actor (Fabio Restrepo).
- Miami International Film Festival: Best film and best actor (Fabio Restrepo).

== DVD release ==
Sumas y restas is available in Region 4 DVD, it can also play in region 1. The film is available on DVD in the USA under the name Medellin in Spanish with English subtitles.
