= Gladiator (2000 film) =

Film by Ridley Scott

- Theatrical release poster
- Directed by: Ridley Scott
- Screenplay by: David Franzoni; John Logan; William Nicholson
- Story by: David Franzoni
- Produced by: Douglas Wick; David Franzoni; Branko Lustig
- Starring: Russell Crowe; Joaquin Phoenix; Connie Nielsen; Oliver Reed; Derek Jacobi; Djimon Hounsou; Richard Harris
- Cinematography: John Mathieson
- Edited by: Pietro Scalia
- Music by: Hans Zimmer; Lisa Gerrard
- Production companies: DreamWorks Pictures; Universal Pictures; Scott Free Productions; Red Wagon Entertainment
- Distributed by: DreamWorks Distribution LLC (United States, Canada and South Korea); Universal Pictures (International; through United International Pictures)
- Release dates: May 1, 2000 (Los Angeles); May 5, 2000 (United States); May 12, 2000 (United Kingdom)
- Running time: 155 minutes
- Countries: United States; United Kingdom
- Language: English
- Budget: $103 million
- Box office: $466 million

Gladiator is a 2000 epic action adventure drama film (Note: Attributed to multiple references:) directed by Ridley Scott and written by David Franzoni, John Logan, and William Nicholson from a story by Franzoni. It stars Russell Crowe, Joaquin Phoenix, Connie Nielsen, Oliver Reed, Derek Jacobi, Djimon Hounsou, and Richard Harris. Crowe portrays Maximus Decimus Meridius, a Roman general who is betrayed when Commodus, the ambitious son of Emperor Marcus Aurelius, murders his father and seizes the throne. Reduced to a slave, Maximus becomes a gladiator and rises through the ranks of the arena, determined to avenge the murders of his family and the emperor.

The screenplay, initially written by Franzoni, was inspired by the 1958 Daniel P. Mannix novel Those About to Die. The script was acquired by DreamWorks Pictures, and Scott signed on to direct the film. Principal photography began in January 1999 and wrapped in May of that year. Production was complicated by the script being rewritten multiple times and by the death of Oliver Reed before production was finished.

Gladiator had its world premiere in Los Angeles, California, on May 1, 2000. The film was released in the United States on May 5, 2000 by DreamWorks Distribution LLC, and internationally on May 12, 2000, by Universal Pictures through United International Pictures. The film grossed $466 million worldwide, becoming the second-highest-grossing film of 2000, and won five Academy Awards, including Best Picture and Best Actor for Crowe. A sequel, Gladiator II, was released in 2024.

== Plot ==
In 180 AD, the Roman general Maximus Decimus Meridius intends to return home after he leads the Roman army to victory against Germanic tribes near Vindobona. Emperor Marcus Aurelius tells Maximus that his own son, Commodus, is unfit to rule and that he wishes Maximus to succeed him, as regent, to restore the Roman Republic. Angered by this decision, Commodus secretly assassinates his father.

Commodus proclaims himself the new emperor and requests loyalty from Maximus, who refuses. Maximus is arrested by Praetorian Guards led by Quintus, who tells Maximus that he and his family will die. Maximus kills his captors and, wounded, rides for his home near Turgalium, where he finds his wife and son murdered. Maximus buries them, then collapses from his injuries. He is found by slave traders, who take him to Zuccabar and sell him to the gladiator trainer Proximo.

Maximus fights in local tournaments, his combat skills helping him win matches and gain popularity. He earns the nickname "the Spaniard" and befriends Juba, a gladiator from Carthage, and Hagen, a gladiator from Germania. In Rome, Commodus organizes 150 days of gladiatorial games to commemorate his father and win the approval of the Roman public. Upon hearing this, Proximo reveals to Maximus that he was once a gladiator who was freed by Marcus Aurelius, and advises him to "win the crowd" to gain his freedom.

Proximo takes his gladiators to fight in Rome's Colosseum. Disguised in a masked helmet, Maximus debuts in the arena as a Carthaginian in a re-enactment of the Battle of Zama. Unexpectedly, he leads his side to victory and wins the crowd's support. Commodus and his young nephew, Lucius, enter the Colosseum to offer congratulations. Seeing Lucius, Maximus refrains from attacking Commodus, who orders him to reveal his identity. Maximus removes his helmet and declares he will seek vengeance on Commodus, who is compelled by the crowd to let Maximus live. That evening, Maximus is visited by Lucilla, his former lover and Commodus' sister. Distrusting her, Maximus refuses her help.

Commodus arranges a duel between Maximus and Tigris of Gaul, an undefeated gladiator. Several tigers are set upon Maximus, but he prevails. At the crowd's desire, Commodus orders Maximus to kill Tigris, but Maximus spares his life in defiance. In response, the crowd chants "Maximus the Merciful", which angers Commodus. To provoke Maximus, Commodus taunts him about the murder of his family, but Maximus resists the urge to strike him. Increasingly paranoid, Commodus instructs his advisor, Falco, to have every senator followed, and refuses to have Maximus killed for fear he will become a martyr.

Maximus discovers from Cicero, his ex-orderly, that his former legions remain loyal to him. He secretly meets with Lucilla and Gracchus, an influential senator. They agree to help Maximus escape from Rome to join his legions in Ostia, which will enable him to oust Commodus and hand power back to the Roman Senate. Soon after, the Praetorians arrest Gracchus. Lucilla meets Maximus at night to arrange his escape and they share a kiss. Lucius accidentally hints at the conspiracy, and Commodus threatens him and Lucilla. Commodus sends the Praetorians to attack the gladiators' barracks, and Proximo and his men sacrifice themselves to enable Maximus to flee. Maximus makes it to the rendezvous point with Cicero, but Commodus' soldiers are waiting, killing Cicero and capturing Maximus.

Commodus demands that Lucilla provide him with an heir. He challenges Maximus to a duel in the Colosseum to win back public approval, and stabs him before the match to gain an advantage. Despite his injury, Maximus disarms Commodus during the duel. After Quintus and the Praetorians refuse to help Commodus, he unsheathes a hidden knife, but Maximus overpowers and kills him. Before Maximus succumbs to his injuries, he asks for political reforms, the emancipation of his gladiator allies, and the reinstatement of Gracchus as a senator. As he dies, Maximus envisions reuniting with his wife and son in the afterlife. His friends and allies honor him as "a soldier of Rome" and carry his body out of the arena, leaving the corpse of Commodus behind. That night, Juba visits the Colosseum and buries figurines of Maximus' wife and son at the spot where Maximus died.

== Cast ==
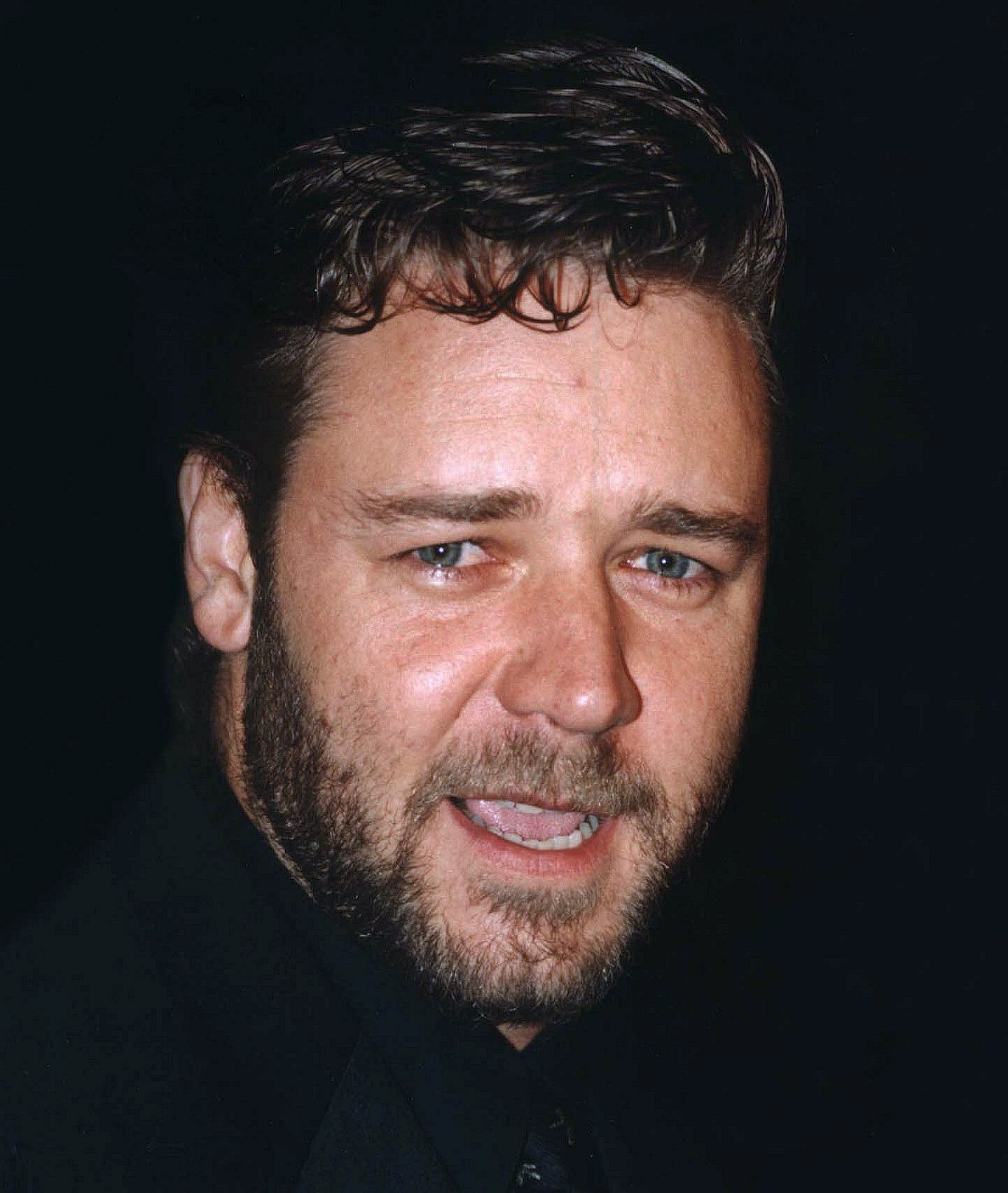
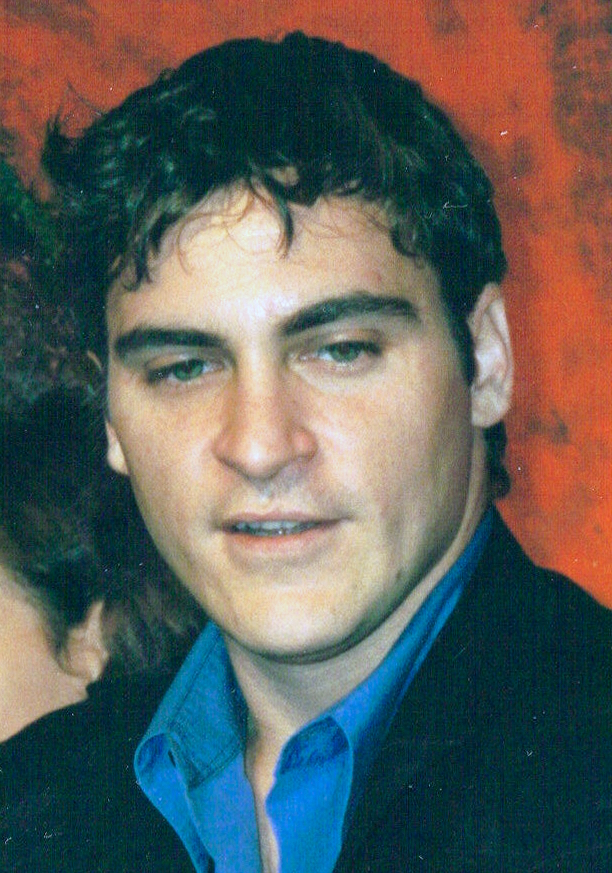
Russell Crowe (left, pictured in 1999) and Joaquin Phoenix (2000)
- Russell Crowe as Maximus Decimus Meridius: A Roman general forced into slavery who seeks revenge against Emperor Commodus for the murder of his family and the previous emperor, Marcus Aurelius.
- Joaquin Phoenix as Commodus: The power-hungry son of Marcus Aurelius who murders his father to become emperor.
- Connie Nielsen as Lucilla: Maximus' former lover and the sister of Commodus.
- Oliver Reed as Antonius Proximo: A gladiator trainer who buys Maximus in North Africa.
- Derek Jacobi as Senator Gracchus: A Roman senator who opposes Commodus' rule.
- Djimon Hounsou as Juba: A Numidian gladiator who befriends Maximus.
- Richard Harris as Marcus Aurelius: The elderly emperor of Rome who appoints Maximus to be his successor, with the ultimate aim of returning Rome to a republican form of government. He is murdered by his son Commodus before his wish can be fulfilled.
- David Hemmings as Cassius: The master of ceremonies for the gladiatorial games in Rome.
- David Schofield as Senator Falco: A patrician senator who helps Commodus consolidate power.
- John Shrapnel as Senator Gaius: A Roman senator allied with Gracchus, Lucilla, and Maximus against Commodus.
- Tomas Arana as Quintus: The commander of the Praetorian Guard who betrays Maximus by allying with Commodus.
- Ralf Möller as Hagen: A Germanic gladiator.
- Spencer Treat Clark as Lucius Verus: The young son of Lucilla.
- Tommy Flanagan as Cicero: The loyal aide of Maximus.
- Sven-Ole Thorsen as Tigris of Gaul: An undefeated gladiator brought out of retirement to kill Maximus.
- Omid Djalili as a slave trader.
- Giannina Facio as Maximus' wife.
- Giorgio Cantarini as Maximus' son.
- John Quinn as Valerius, a Roman general in the army of Maximus.

== Production ==
=== Development ===
David Franzoni, who wrote the first draft of the Gladiator screenplay, traveled across Eastern Europe and the Middle East by motorcycle in 1972. "Everywhere I went in Europe, there were arenas", Franzoni recalled. "Even as I went east, going through Turkey, I began to think to myself this must have been a hell of a franchise." During a stop in Baghdad, Iraq, he started reading the 1958 Daniel P. Mannix novel Those About to Die, (Note: Subsequently titled The Way of the Gladiator) which gave him the idea for Gladiator.

Twenty-five years later, Franzoni wrote the screenplay for Steven Spielberg's Amistad, which was Spielberg's first film for DreamWorks Pictures. Though Amistad was only a moderate commercial success, DreamWorks was impressed with Franzoni's screenplay and gave him a three-picture deal as writer and co-producer. Remembering his 1972 trip, Franzoni pitched his gladiator story idea to Spielberg, who immediately told him to write the script. After reading the ancient Roman text Historia Augusta, Franzoni chose to center the story on Commodus. The protagonist was Narcissus, a wrestler who, according to the ancient historians Herodian and Cassius Dio, strangled Commodus to death.

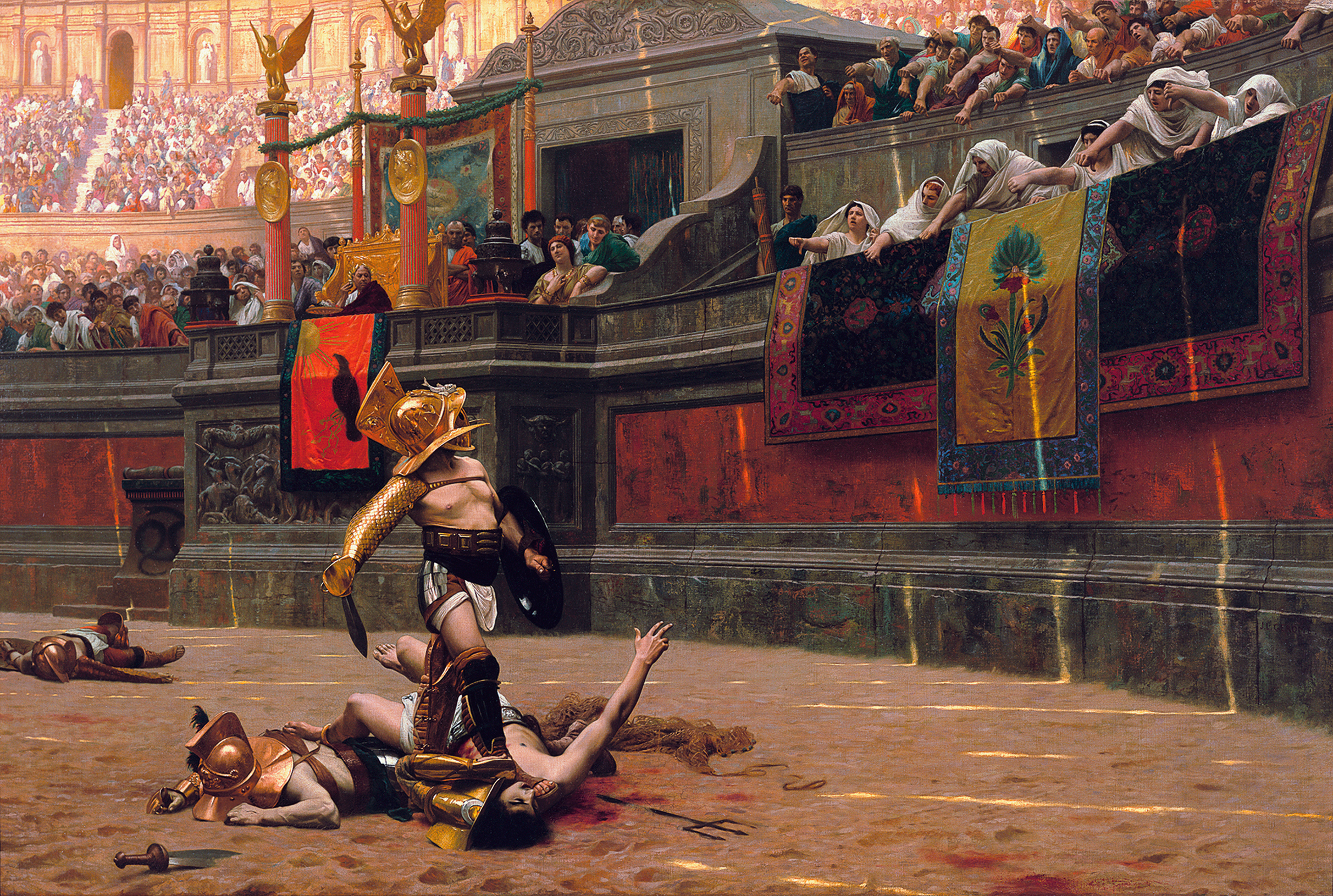
Pollice Verso by Jean-Léon Gérôme

DreamWorks producers Walter F. Parkes and Douglas Wick felt that Ridley Scott would be the ideal director to bring Franzoni's story to life. They showed him a copy of Jean-Léon Gérôme's 1872 painting Pollice Verso, which Scott said portrays the Roman Empire "in all its glory and wickedness". He was so captivated by the image that he immediately agreed to direct the film. When Parkes pointed out that Scott did not know anything about the story, Scott replied, "I don’t care, I’ll do it".

Once Scott was on board, he and Franzoni discussed films that could influence Gladiator, such as One Flew Over the Cuckoo's Nest, La Dolce Vita, and The Conformist. However, Scott felt Franzoni's dialogue lacked subtlety, and he hired John Logan to rewrite the script. Logan rewrote much of the first act and made the decision to kill off Maximus' family to increase the character's desire for revenge. In November 1998, DreamWorks reached a deal with Universal Pictures to help finance the film: DreamWorks would distribute the film in North America, while Universal Pictures would distribute it internationally.

=== Casting ===
Before Russell Crowe was cast as Maximus, several other actors were considered for the role, including Antonio Banderas, Tom Cruise and Mel Gibson, who turned down the role as he was already committed to The Patriot (2000). The producers of Gladiator had Crowe at the top of their list after his breakout performance in L.A. Confidential (1997). Jude Law auditioned for Commodus, but Joaquin Phoenix was offered the part after sending in a "knockout" audition tape. Jennifer Lopez reportedly auditioned for Lucilla, but the role went to Connie Nielsen. Lou Ferrigno was offered the role of Tigris of Gaul, but it ultimately went to Sven-Ole Thorsen. While portraying Commodus, Phoenix used a British accent associated with aristocratic Roman status, while Crowe used a mixed Australian and British-inflected accent for Maximus.

=== Filming ===
The film was shot at three main locations between January and May 1999. The opening battle scene set in the forests of Germania was shot at Bourne Wood, near Farnham, Surrey, in England. When Scott learned that the Forestry Commission was planning to remove a section of the forest, he obtained permission to burn it down for the scene. The scenes of slavery, desert travel, and the gladiatorial training school were shot in Ouarzazate, Morocco. The scenes set in Rome were shot in Malta, where the crew built a replica of about one-third of the Colosseum to a height of 52 feet (16 meters). The other two-thirds and remaining height were added digitally. The scenes of Maximus' farm were filmed in Val d'Orcia, Italy.

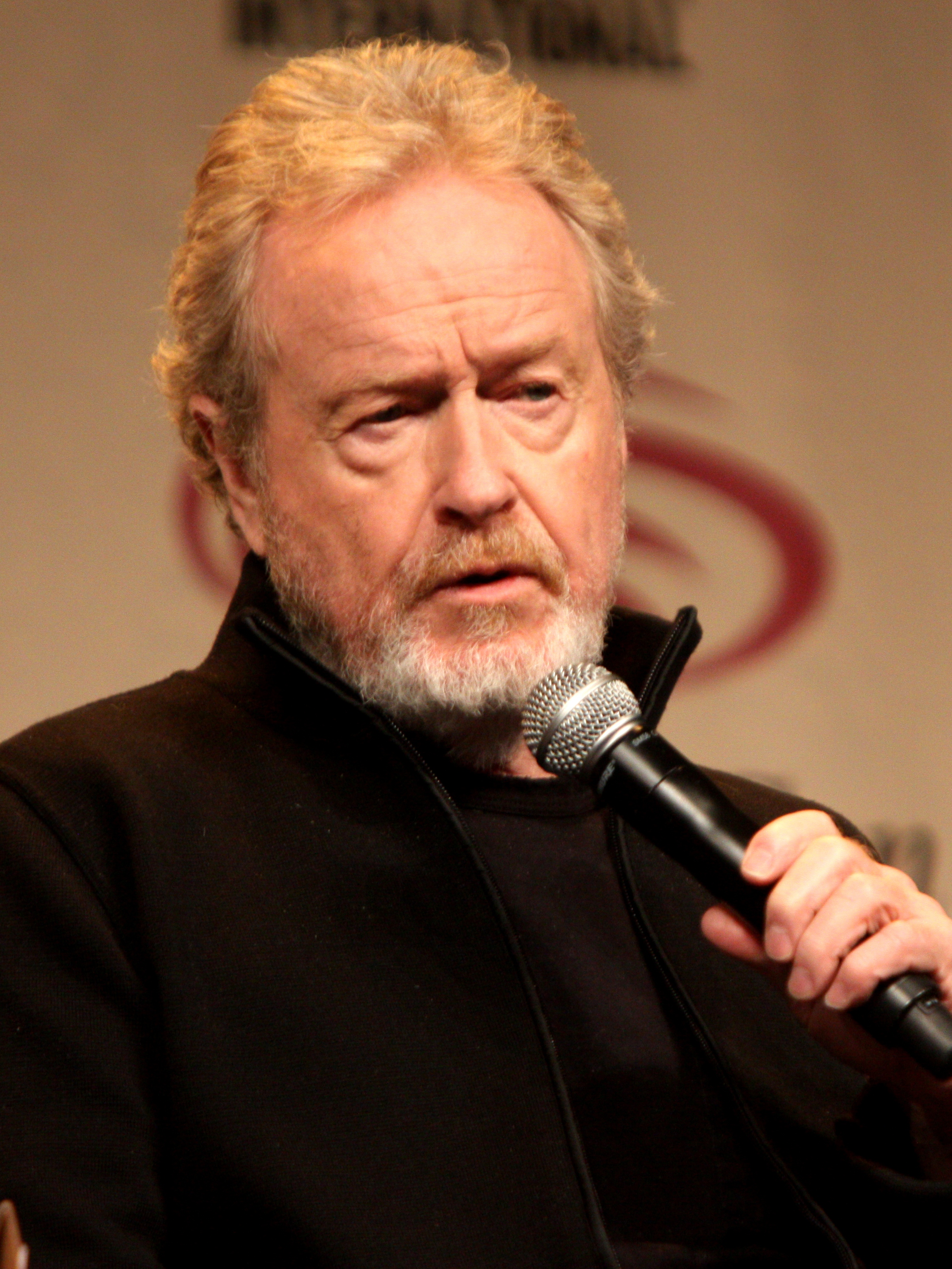
Director Ridley Scott, pictured in 2012

When filming battle scenes, Scott and cinematographer John Mathieson used multiple cameras filming at various frame rates and used a 45-degree shutter, which resulted in stylized visuals similar to those found in Saving Private Ryan. For the fight sequence involving tigers, both real tigers and a dummy tiger were used. Some of the live animals were filmed on set with the actors, and some were filmed against a bluescreen and then digitally composited into the scene.

Crowe experienced multiple injuries during filming, including a lower back injury resulting from falls during fight sequences. In the years following the production, Crowe has had problems with his knees, shoulders, and Achilles tendons, all of which he attributes to Gladiator. Oliver Reed, who plays Proximo, died of a heart attack on May 2, before all his scenes had been filmed. His character was meant to survive, but after Reed's death the script was revised to include Proximo's death at the hands of the Praetorian Guard. To make it appear that Reed had performed the entirety of Proximo's scenes, a body double was used, and Reed's face was digitally attached to the body of the double in post-production. (Note: Attributed to multiple references:) The film is dedicated to Reed.

=== Script complaints and revisions ===
Although Franzoni and Logan completed a second draft of the screenplay in October 1998, Crowe has claimed that the script was "substantially underdone" when filming began three months later. In an interview with Inside the Actors Studio, Crowe said the crew "started shooting with about 32 pages and went through them in the first couple of weeks." The script was constantly changing throughout principal photography, with Scott soliciting input from writers, producers and actors. Some dialogue was created on the spot, such as Commodus' line "Am I not merciful?", which was ad-libbed by Phoenix. Crowe invented the phrase "Strength and Honor", which is a modified version of the Latin motto of his high school, "Veritate et Virtute", which translates as "Truth and Virtue". Crowe also improvised part of the scene in which Maximus describes his home to Marcus Aurelius. Instead of recounting the details of a fictional place, Crowe described his own home in Australia.

At one point, William Nicholson was hired to rewrite the script to make Maximus a more sensitive character. He reworked Maximus' friendship with Juba and developed the afterlife plot thread. He said he "did not want to see a film about a man who wanted to kill somebody". Crowe, however, was unhappy with some of Nicholson's dialogue. Allegedly, he called the dialogue "garbage", but claimed he was such a talented actor that he could make it sound good. According to a DreamWorks executive, Crowe tried to rewrite "the entire script" during shooting, and initially refused to say the line "In this life or the next, I will have my vengeance."

=== Music ===
The musical score for Gladiator was composed by Hans Zimmer and Lisa Gerrard, and conducted by Gavin Greenaway. The original soundtrack for the film was produced by Decca Records and released on April 25, 2000. Decca later released three follow-up albums: Gladiator: More Music From the Motion Picture (2001), Gladiator: Special Anniversary Edition (2005), and Gladiator: 20th Anniversary Edition (2020).

In 2006, the Holst Foundation sued Hans Zimmer, accusing him of copying the work of the late Gustav Holst in the Gladiator score. The case was settled out of court.

== Release ==
=== Box office ===
Gladiator had its world premiere in Los Angeles, California, on May 1, 2000. It was released in the United States and Canada on May 5, 2000. It earned $34.8 million during its opening weekend, making it the third-highest for an R-rated film, after Air Force One ($37.1 million) and Interview with the Vampire ($36.4 million), and the number one film of the weekend. The film remained number one in its second weekend, collecting $24.6 million and beating out newcomer Battlefield Earth ($11.5 million). During its third weekend, Gladiator fell to second place with $19.7 million, behind Dinosaur ($38.9 million). The film spent a total of ten weeks in the top ten at the box office, and was in theaters for over a year, finishing its theatrical run on May 10, 2001. Its total gross in the United States and Canada was $187.7 million.

In the United Kingdom, Gladiator opened on May 12, 2000, and grossed £3.5 million in its opening weekend. It spent seven weeks at number one, and its total gross surpassed $43 million. (Note: Attributed to multiple references:) The film was also number one for seven weeks in Italy, and for five weeks in France. (Note: Attributed to multiple references:) Outside of the United States and Canada, Gladiator grossed $277.8 million, for a total worldwide gross of $465.5 million against a budget of $103 million. It was the second-highest-grossing film worldwide in 2000, behind Mission: Impossible 2 ($546.3 million).

=== Theatrical re-releases ===
In 2020, Gladiator was re-released in Australia and the Netherlands to commemorate its 20th anniversary. This limited release grossed $4.8 million. The following year, it was re-released in the United Kingdom, earning a gross of $16,257. In 2024, it was released again the UK, this time earning $125,898.

=== Home media and rights ===
Gladiator was first released on DVD and VHS on November 21, 2000, and generated $60 million in sales within the first week. (Note: Attributed to multiple references:)

In September 2009, Gladiator was released by Paramount Home Entertainment on Blu-ray. It was re-released in August 2010 in a higher quality transfer, and in May 2018 it was released on Ultra HD Blu-ray. An extended version of the film, with 16 extra minutes of footage, is also available on Blu-ray, DVD and VHS. (Note: Attributed to multiple references:) In March 2021, Paramount Home Entertainment included Gladiator as part of a ten-film Blu-ray set.

== Reception ==
=== Critical response ===
On the review aggregator website Rotten Tomatoes, 80% of 260 critics' reviews are positive, with an average rating of 7.1/10. The website's consensus reads: "While not everyone will be entertained by Gladiator's glum revenge story, Russell Crowe thunderously wins the crowd with a star-making turn that provides Ridley Scott's opulent resurrection of Rome its bruised heart." On Metacritic, the film has a score of 67 out of 100, based on 46 critics. Audiences polled on Gladiator's opening day by the market research firm CinemaScore gave the film an average grade of "A" on an A+ to F scale.

Gladiator was called "magnificent", "compelling", and "richly enjoyable" by some critics. (Note: Attributed to multiple references:) Crowe's performance in particular received praise. Writing for The Wall Street Journal, Joe Morgensten said that Crowe "doesn't use tricks in this role to court our approval. He earns it the old-fashioned way, by daring to be quiet, if not silent, and intensely, implacably strong." Kenneth Turan of the Los Angeles Times wrote that Crowe brings an "essential physical and psychological reality to the role", while Kirk Honeycutt of The Hollywood Reporter said that Crowe uses "his burly frame and expressive face to give dimension to what might otherwise have been comic book heroics." Variety called Crowe's performance "simply splendid".

Several critics also praised Scott's directing and the visual style of the film. Manohla Dargis of LA Weekly commended Scott's state-of-the-art filmmaking and expressed admiration for the film's "breathtaking, brutal lyricism". Entertainment Weekly called the opening battle sequence "extraordinary", and described Scott as a "visual artist at his most deluxe." Michael Wilmington of The Chicago Tribune called Gladiator "visually electrifying". In addition to Crowe's acting and Scott's directing, some reviewers also applauded John Mathieson's cinematography, Arthur Max's production design, and the musical score composed by Hans Zimmer and Lisa Gerrard. (Note: Attributed to multiple references:)

Although critics lauded many aspects of Gladiator, some derided the screenplay. Ian Nathan of Empire magazine called the dialogue "pompous", "overwritten", and "prone to plain silliness". Roger Ebert said the script "employs depression as a substitute for personality, and believes that if characters are bitter and morose enough, we won't notice how dull they are." Manohla Dargis called the story predictable and formulaic.

In his 2004 book The Assassination of Julius Caesar, the political scientist Michael Parenti described Gladiator as "unencumbered by any trace of artistic merit". He also criticized the film's depiction of Roman citizens, claiming that it portrays them as bloodthirsty savages. Brandon Zachary of ScreenRant and others have noted that the plot of Gladiator borrows heavily from the 1964 film The Fall of the Roman Empire, which is also about the transition of power from Marcus Aurelius to Commodus and the latter's downfall.

=== Accolades ===
Gladiator won various awards, including the Academy Award for Best Picture, the BAFTA Award for Best Film and the Golden Globe Award for Best Motion Picture – Drama. (Note: Attributed to multiple references:)

Award	Category	Recipients	Result
Academy Awards	Best Picture	David Franzoni, Branko Lustig and Douglas Wick	Won
Academy Awards	Best Director	Ridley Scott	Nominated
Academy Awards	Best Actor	Russell Crowe	Won
Academy Awards	Best Supporting Actor	Joaquin Phoenix	Nominated
Academy Awards	Best Original Screenplay	David Franzoni, John Logan and William Nicholson	Nominated
Academy Awards	Best Art Direction	Art Direction: Arthur Max; Set Decoration: Crispian Sallis	Nominated
Academy Awards	Best Cinematography	John Mathieson	Nominated
Academy Awards	Best Costume Design	Janty Yates	Won
Academy Awards	Best Film Editing	Pietro Scalia	Nominated
Academy Awards	Best Original Score	Hans Zimmer	Nominated
Academy Awards	Best Sound	Bob Beemer, Scott Millan and Ken Weston	Won
Academy Awards	Best Visual Effects	Tim Burke, Neil Corbould, Rob Harvey and John Nelson	Won
American Cinema Editors Eddie Awards	Best Edited Feature Film — Dramatic	Pietro Scalia	Won
Art Directors Guild Awards	Excellence in Production Design Award — Period Feature Film	Arthur Max	Won
BAFTA Awards	Best Film	David Franzoni, Branko Lustig and Douglas Wick	Won
BAFTA Awards	Best Direction	Ridley Scott	Nominated
BAFTA Awards	Best Original Screenplay	David Franzoni, John Logan, and William Nicholson	Nominated
BAFTA Awards	Best Actor in a Leading Role	Russell Crowe	Nominated
BAFTA Awards	Best Actor in a Supporting Role	Joaquin Phoenix	Nominated
BAFTA Awards	Best Actor in a Supporting Role	Oliver Reed (posthumous)	Nominated
BAFTA Awards	Best Cinematography	John Mathieson	Won
BAFTA Awards	Best Production Design	Arthur Max	Won
BAFTA Awards	Best Costume Design	Janty Yates	Nominated
BAFTA Awards	Best Film Music	Lisa Gerrard and Hans Zimmer	Nominated
BAFTA Awards	Best Makeup & Hair	Paul Engelen and Graham Johnston	Nominated
BAFTA Awards	Best Editing	Pietro Scalia	Won
BAFTA Awards	Best Sound	Bob Beemer, Per Hallberg, Scott Millan, and Ken Weston	Nominated
BAFTA Awards	Best Special Visual Effects	Tim Burke, Neil Corbould, Rob Harvey, and John Nelson	Nominated
Critics' Choice Awards	Best Picture		Won
Critics' Choice Awards	Best Director	Ridley Scott	Nominated
Critics' Choice Awards	Best Actor	Russell Crowe	Won
Critics' Choice Awards	Best Supporting Actor	Joaquin Phoenix	Won
Critics' Choice Awards	Best Cinematography	John Mathieson	Won
Critics' Choice Awards	Best Production Design	Arthur Max	Won
Critics' Choice Awards	Best Score	Hans Zimmer	Won
Directors Guild of America Awards	Outstanding Directing – Feature Film	Ridley Scott	Nominated
Golden Globe Awards	Best Motion Picture – Drama		Won
Golden Globe Awards	Best Director	Ridley Scott	Nominated
Golden Globe Awards	Best Actor – Motion Picture Drama	Russell Crowe	Nominated
Golden Globe Awards	Best Supporting Actor – Motion Picture	Joaquin Phoenix	Nominated
Golden Globe Awards	Best Original Score	Lisa Gerrard and Hans Zimmer	Won
London Film Critics Circle	Actor of the Year	Russell Crowe	Won
National Board of Review Awards	Top 10 Films		7th Place
National Board of Review Awards	Best Supporting Actor	Joaquin Phoenix (also for Quills and The Yards)	Won
Producers Guild of America Awards	Best Theatrical Motion Picture	Branko Lustig and Douglas Wick	Won
Saturn Awards	Best Action/Adventure/Thriller Film		Nominated
Saturn Awards	Best Director	Ridley Scott	Nominated
Saturn Awards	Best Writing	David Franzoni, John Logan, William Nicholson	Nominated
Saturn Awards	Best Actor	Russell Crowe	Nominated
Saturn Awards	Best Costume	Janty Yates	Nominated
Saturn Awards	Best Music	Lisa Gerrard and Hans Zimmer	Nominated
Screen Actors Guild Awards	Outstanding Performance by a Cast in a Motion Picture	Russell Crowe, Richard Harris, Djimon Hounsou, Derek Jacobi, Connie Nielsen, Joaquin Phoenix, and Oliver Reed	Nominated
Screen Actors Guild Awards	Outstanding Performance by a Male Actor in a Leading Role	Russell Crowe	Nominated
Screen Actors Guild Awards	Outstanding Performance by a Male Actor in a Supporting Role	Joaquin Phoenix	Nominated

In 2021, Empire magazine ranked Gladiator 39th on its "100 Best Movies Of All Time" list, and declared it the 22nd best film of the 21st century. Rotten Tomatoes included the film on its list of "140 Essential 2000s Movies". The character Maximus was ranked as the 50th best hero on AFI's 100 Years...100 Heroes and Villains list, and placed 95th on Empire's list of 100 Greatest Movie Characters. In 2021, members of Writers Guild of America West (WGAW) and Writers Guild of America East (WGAE) voted its screenplay 47th in WGA’s 101 Greatest Screenplays of the 21st Century (So Far). In 2025, Gladiator ranked number 92 on The New York Times list of "The 100 Best Movies of the 21st Century" and number 33 on the "Readers' Choice" edition of the list.

== Historical accuracy ==
Gladiator is loosely based on real events that occurred within the Roman Empire in the latter half of the 2nd century AD. Scott intended to portray Roman culture more accurately than previous films, so he hired several historians as advisors. Nevertheless, multiple deviations from historical accuracy were made to increase interest, maintain narrative continuity, and for practical or safety reasons. At least one historical advisor resigned due to these changes. Another asked not to be mentioned in the credits. Allen Ward, a historian at the University of Connecticut, believed that a higher level of historical accuracy would not have made Gladiator less interesting or exciting. He asserted that filmmakers must be granted some artistic license when adapting historical events, but this license should not be employed to completely disregard facts.

=== Fictionalization ===
A number of events in the film are presented in a way that directly contradicts historical fact.

- Marcus Aurelius was not murdered by his son Commodus, as shown in the film; he died at Vindobona (modern Vienna) in 180 AD from the Antonine Plague. The epidemic, believed to be either smallpox or measles, swept through the Roman Empire during his reign.
- There is no indication that Marcus Aurelius wished to return the Empire to a republican form of government, as depicted in Gladiator. Moreover, Aurelius shared the rule of the Empire with Commodus for three years before his own death. Commodus then ruled alone until his death in 192 AD.
- The film depicts Aurelius seizing victory in the Marcomannic Wars. In reality, the wars were ongoing when he died. Commodus secured peace with the two Germanic tribes allied against Rome, the Marcomanni and the Quadi, immediately after his father's death.
- The character Maximus is fictional, although in some respects he resembles Spartacus, who led a slave revolt in 73-71 BCE, and Marcus Nonius Macrinus, a general and friend of Marcus Aurelius. (Note: Attributed to multiple references:)
- Although Commodus engaged in show combat in the Colosseum, he was not killed in the arena; he was strangled while taking a bath by the wrestler Narcissus. Commodus reigned for over twelve years, unlike the shorter period portrayed in the film.
- In Gladiator, Lucilla is depicted as the widow of Lucius Verus. She has one son, also named Lucius Verus. In reality, Lucilla's son died long before the reign of Commodus, and she remarried Claudius Pompeianus soon after Verus' death. She had been married to Claudius for 11 years by the time her brother became Emperor, and her only living son during this time was Aurelius Pompeianus.
- The real-life Lucilla was implicated in a plot to assassinate her brother Commodus in 182 AD, along with several others. She was first exiled to the island of Capri by Commodus, then executed on his orders later in the year.
- In the film, Marcus Aurelius bans gladiatorial games in Rome. The real Aurelius, however, banned games only in Antioch. No games were ever banned in Rome.

=== Anachronisms ===
Some costumes and weapons are depicted inaccurately in Gladiator.

- Although Gladiator takes place in the 2nd century AD, the Imperial Gallic armor and the helmets worn by the legionaries are from AD 75, a century earlier. The centurions, cavalry, standard bearers, and auxiliaries would have worn scale armor, known as lorica squamata.
- The Praetorian Guards wear Tyrian purple in the film, but this wardrobe is not corroborated by historical evidence. On campaign, they usually wore standard legionary equipment with some unique decorative elements.
- Gladiator depicts Germanic tribes inaccurately wearing clothing from the Stone Age.
- The film shows the Roman cavalry using stirrups. In reality, the cavalry used a two-horned saddle without stirrups. The stirrups were employed during filming because riding with a Roman saddle requires additional training and skill.
- According to the classical scholar Martin Winkler, catapults and ballistae would not have been used in a forest, as they were reserved primarily for sieges and were rarely used in open battles.
- There is no documentation of the use of flaming arrows or flaming catapult canisters in ancient history.

== Sequels ==
A sequel to Gladiator, titled Gladiator II, was released in November 2024. It is directed by Ridley Scott, written by David Scarpa, and produced by Scott Free Productions for Paramount Pictures. It stars Paul Mescal, Denzel Washington, Joseph Quinn, Fred Hechinger, Pedro Pascal, Connie Nielsen, and Derek Jacobi, the last two reprising their roles from Gladiator. In addition to directing the film, Scott served as a producer alongside Michael Pruss, Douglas Wick and Lucy Fisher. The costume designer Janty Yates and the production designer Arthur Max—both of whom worked on Gladiator—returned for the sequel. The story of the film centers on Lucilla's son, Lucius, who is now a grown man and is revealed to be the son of Maximus. A third film is also in the works. (Note: Attributed to multiple references:)

== See also ==
- List of films set in ancient Rome
