= Hang the DJ (film) =

- Directed by: Marco La Villa; Mauro La Villa
- Produced by: Marco La Villa; Mauro La Villa; Henrique Vera Villanueva; Andrea Kragaris (Executive Producer); Carlos Orengo (Executive Producer); Rafael Rodriguez (Executive Producer); Diego Briceno (Associate Producer); Solieman Mellali (Associate Producer); Vincenzo Scanzano (Associate Producer)
- Starring: Roger Sanchez; Junior Vasquez; DJ Qbert; Mix Master Mike; John "Jellybean" Benitez; Carl Cox; Claudio Coccoluto; Kool DJ Red Alert
- Cinematography: Stephen Reizes; Steve Beasse; Bill St. John
- Edited by: Jules Collette
- Distributed by: Pony Canyon
- Release date: 18 September 1998 (Canada)
- Running time: 90 minutes
- Language: English
- Budget: $900,000

Hang The DJ is a 1998 music documentary film debut by identical twin brothers Marco and Mauro La Villa. The idea for this documentary came to them in 1992 while they were working at their uncle's pizza store on St-Laurent Boulevard in Montreal to help pay tuition for a degree in Film Studies at Concordia University. The brothers originally had no interest in DJs or documentaries but became interested in the scene after working late nights and meeting the regular neighborhood club crowd. Mauro has said, "we heard a lot about the gossip and conflicts of the DJ world", which gave the brothers the idea to make a documentary by following disc jockeys around the world to get a sense of what being a DJ really was. Featuring Roger Sanchez, Junior Vasquez, DJ Qbert and A-Trak, the film presents the cult of DJs in the era that catapulted them into superstars from the underground. The documentary contains a mix of DJ sets from around the globe counterbalanced with commentary from fans and interviews with the DJs.

The film's name comes from the lyrics of the 1986 song "Panic" by The Smiths, which Mauro described as "the anthem of our high school years".

== Production ==
The film was shot over a period of two years throughout 1996 and 1997. The shooting locations encompassed many cultural hubs from around the world, including Amsterdam, Cannes, Essen, Liverpool, London, Las Vegas, Los Angeles, Madrid, Miami, Montreal, New York City, Nottingham, Paris, San Francisco, Tokyo, and Washington, D.C.

== Release ==
=== Locations ===
Hang the DJ premiered at the 1998 Toronto International Film Festival in September 1998 and also screened at the International Documentary Film Festival Amsterdam, the Stockholm International Film Festival, the Melbourne International Film Festival and the New Zealand International Film Festival previous to its theatrical release. The film was later released in a select 13 Canadian cities and lasted four weeks in Cineplex Odeon theaters through the month of January in 2001; continuing to run in select second-run cinemas until March.

=== Merchandise ===
To promote the film the La Villa brothers partnered with an array of different companies releasing an arrange of products, including posters, postcards, an Austrian-based energy drink with Power Horse and a clothing collaboration with Tommy Hilfiger.

== Soundtrack ==
No.	Title	Music	Length
1.	"The Exorcist"	A-Trak
2.	"No Sex on the Dance Floor"	Alien Broadcast System
3.	"Calling America"	Alien Broadcast System
4.	"Sonic Boom"	Desert
5.	"The Feeling is Good"	Nicola Torriero feat. Chancelle
6.	"Time to Stop"	Roger Sanchez
7.	"Me and My Baby"	Taishisha Grant
8.	"This Joy"	Junior Vasquez feat. Vernessa
9.	"Full Circle"	Mimi Summers
10.	"Sometimes"	Eric Kupper feat. Mimi Summers
11.	"We Can Do It"	Claudio Cocoluto & Savino

== Critical reception ==
Hang the DJ opened to relatively positive reviews from fans. Many critics found the movie to not have a central theme and felt that the documentary tried to cover too much information without having any real outcome. Wesley Morris wrote for the San Francisco Chronicle stating that "the film doesn't present a particularly persuasive case for any of its turntablist subjects".

=== Accolades ===
Award	Date of ceremony	Category	Recipients	Result
1998 Gijón International Film Festival	November 27, 1998	Best Feature	Marco La Villa and Mauro La Villa	Nominated

== See also ==
Hang the DJ (Black Mirror)
