= Cartagena International Film Festival =

Film festival held in Colombia

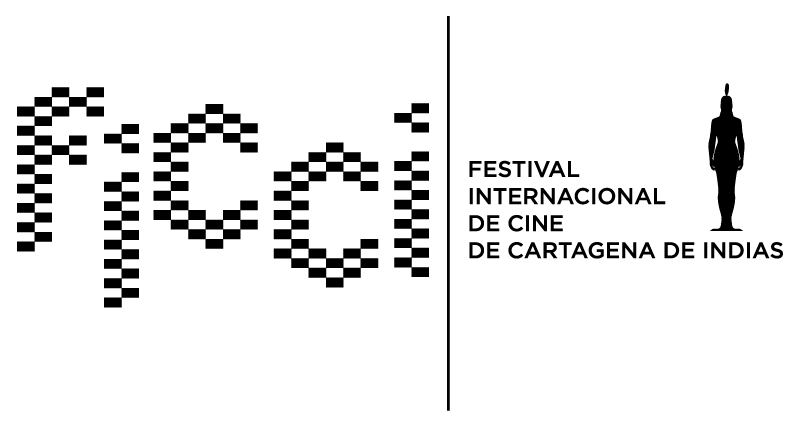

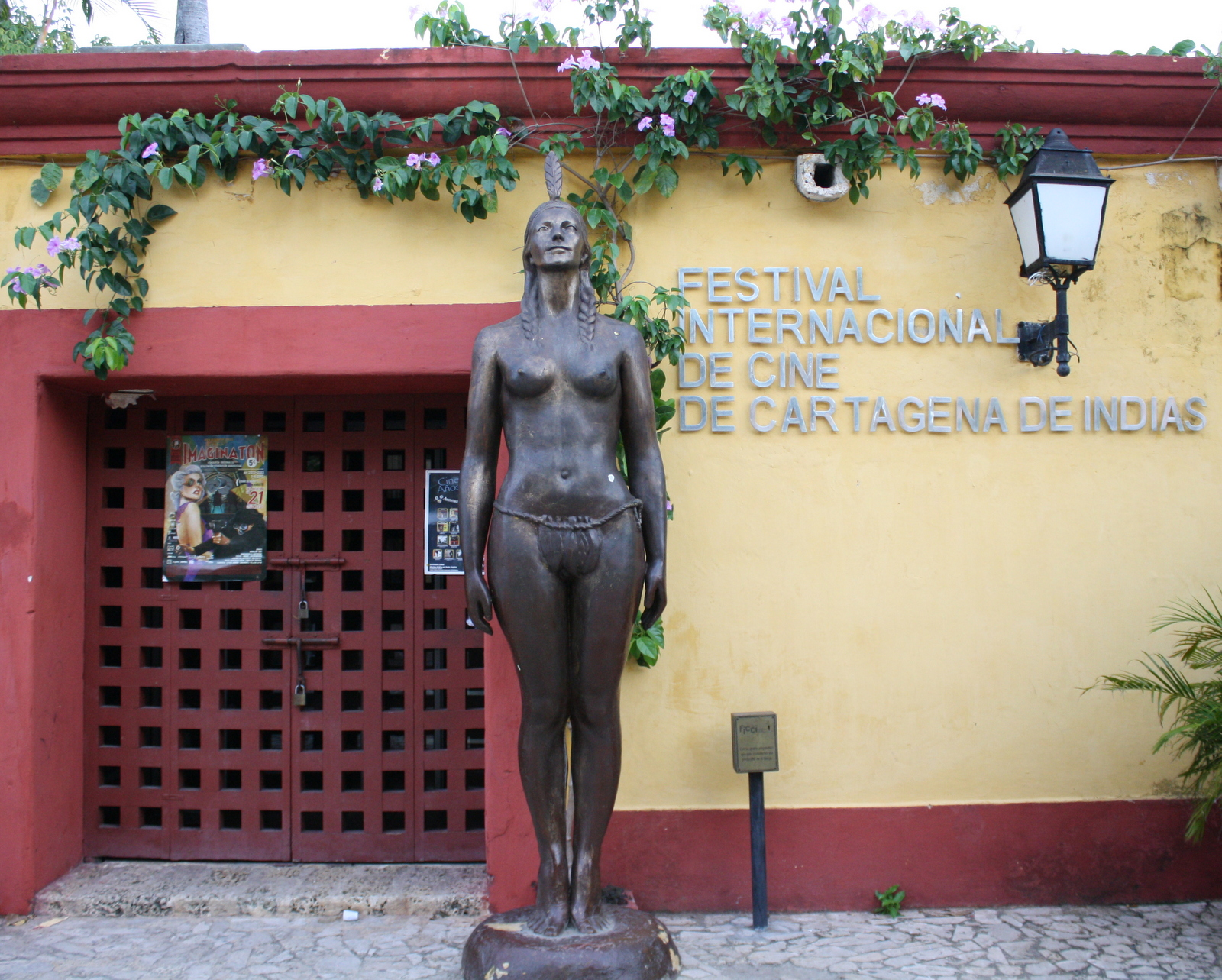
- Cartagena International Film Festival office
- Location: Cartagena, Colombia
- Founded: 1959
- Founded by: Víctor Nieto
- Awards: Golden India Catalina
- Language: Spanish
- Website: www.ficcifestival.com

The Cartagena International Film Festival (Spanish: Festival Internacional de Cine de Cartagena de Indias), or FICCI, is a film festival held in Cartagena, Colombia, which focuses mainly on the promotion of Colombian television series, Latin American films and short films. It is held every March, and is the oldest film festival in Latin America.

The Cartagena International Film Festival was founded 1959 by Víctor Nieto. Nieto remained the director of the film festival for 48 years, his last being in 2008. Nieto died at the age of 92 in November 2008. Lina Paola Rodriguez was appointed manager by Nieto in 2007 and 2008, and became acting director following Nieto's death.

== Directors ==
Term start	Term end	Name	Ref.
1959	2008	Víctor Nieto	
2008 (acting)	-	Lina Paola Rodriguez	
2018	-	Felipe Aljure	

== Best Film winners ==
Year	Film	Director	Country	Ref.
1961	La Cucaracha	Ismael Rodríguez	Mexico	
1962	O Pagador de Promessas	Anselmo Duarte	Brazil	
1969	El dependiente	Leonardo Favio	Argentina	
1972	Juan Lamaglia y señora	Raúl de la Torre	Argentina	
1973	Espejismo	Armando Robles Godoy	Peru	
1974	Los siete locos	Leopoldo Torre Nilsson	Argentina	
1976	Furtivos	José Luis Borau	Spain	
1977	Cantata de Chile	Humberto Solás	Cuba	
1979	El pez que fuma	Román Chalbaud	Venezuela	
1980	El otro Francisco	Sergio Giral	Cuba	
1985	Oriana	Fina Torres	Venezuela, France	
1986	Visa USA	Lisandro Duque Naranjo	Colombia, Cuba	
1989	The Mouth of the Wolf	Francisco José Lombardi	Peru	
1990	La Tigra	Camilo Luzuriaga	Ecuador	
1991	Yo, la peor de todas	María Luisa Bemberg	Argentina	
1992	Tacones lejanos	Pedro Almodóvar	Spain, France	
1993	O Corpo	José Antonio Garcia	Brazil	
1994	La madre muerta	Ana Álvarez	Spain	
1998	Bajo bandera	Juan José Jusid	Argentina, Italy	
2000	Garage Olimpo	Marco Bechis	Argentina, Italy, France	
2000	Orfeu	Carlos Diegues	Brazil	
2001	Eu Tu Eles	Andrucha Waddington	Brazil	
2002	Lavoura Arcaica	Luiz Fernando Carvalho	Brazil	
2003	Cidade de Deus	Fernando Meirelles	Brazil	
2004	Carandiru	Héctor Babenco	Brazil, Argentina, Italy	
2005	Sumas y restas	Víctor Gaviria	Colombia, Spain	
2006	La última luna	Miguel Littín	Mexico, Spain, Chile	
2007	La edad de la peseta	Pavel Giroud	Cuba, Spain, Venezuela	
2008	Maldeamores	Carlitos Ruiz Ruiz, Mariem Pérez Riera	Puerto Rico, USA	
2009	Lake Tahoe	Fernando Eimbcke	Mexico, Japan, USA	
2010	Gigante	Adrián Biniez	Uruguay, Argentina, Germany, Spain, Netherlands	
2011	Post Mortem	Pablo Larraín	Chile, Germany, Mexico	
2012	El estudiante	Santiago Mitre	Argentina	
2013	Tabu	Miguel Gomes	Portugal	
2014	Tierra en la lengua	Rubén Mendoza	Colombia	
2015	Ixcanul	Jayro Bustamante	Guatemala	
2016	Neon Bull	Gabriel Mascaro	Brazil	
2017	Aquarius	Kleber Mendonça Filho	Brazil	
2018	Cocote	Nelson Carlo de los Santos Arias	Dominican Republic	

== See also ==
- Latin American television awards
