= Víctor Nieto =

Víctor Nieto Nuñez (1916 – November 28, 2008) was the Colombian founder and director of the Cartagena Film Festival, the oldest film festival in Latin America.

Nieto was born in Cartagena, Colombia. He began his career as a radio broadcaster. In 1939, Nieto launched a regional radio news program called Sintesis. He opened a series of radio stations beginning in 1946. For example, in 1949 Nieto opened both the Radio Centro Miramar station and the Cine Miramar theater in Cartagena.

In 1960 he founded the Cartagena International Film Festival, in the company of a group of businessmen and personalities from the cultural world of Cartagena, by initiating a series of contacts with the International Federation of Film Producers Associations through the Colombian Embassy in Paris. France. To organize the Film Festival, he made the most of the historical, tourist and natural advantages that the Caribbean city offered, with the support of the Colombian government.

He served as director of the Cartagena Film Festival for 48 years, despite failing health during his later life. Due to ill health, Nieto hired appointed managers to run the basic operations and preparations for the festival. Lina Paola Rodriguez became manager in 2007 under Nieto. Nieto's last film festival was in 2008.

Nieto also worked as a journalist, writing for several Colombian publications including the El Espectador, El Universal and the El Tiempo.

Victor Nieto died of a stroke on November 28, 2008, at the age of 92. He is survived by his wife, Mary Luz Milanes de Nieto, two sons, Martín and Gerardo, and several grandchildren
