= La vendedora de rosas =

- Theatrical release poster
- Directed by: Víctor Gaviria
- Written by: Víctor Gaviria; Carlos Henao
- Based on: The Little Match Girl by Hans Christian Andersen
- Produced by: Erwin Goggel
- Starring: Lady Tabares; Marta Correa; Mileider Gil; Diana Murillo; Giovanny Quiroz
- Cinematography: Rodrigo Lalinde
- Music by: Luis Franco
- Release date: 28 August 1998
- Running time: 120 minutes
- Country: Colombia
- Language: Spanish

La vendedora de rosas (The Rose Seller) is a 1998 Colombian film directed by Víctor Gaviria, who also co-wrote the script. The film is loosely based on the 1845 fairy tale "The Little Match Girl" by Hans Christian Andersen; it was entered into the 1998 Cannes Film Festival. The film was selected as the Colombian entry for the Best Foreign Language Film at the 71st Academy Awards, but was not accepted as a nominee. The film is notable for young children who never acted before, but lived on the streets of Medellin, Colombia, to portray the characters. It follows a young girl named Andrea (Mileider Gil), who after a fight with her mother, flees to stay with her best friend Monica (Leidy Tabares), an orphaned rose seller. While Andrea works alongside Monica, she realizes street life is not as easy as she believed. Monica must evade capture from the local gang, ruled by Don Hector (Elkin Rodriguez).

Many of the actors that starred in the film are now dead or in prison. Giovanni Quiroz was murdered in Medellín and Leidy Tabares was incarcerated for her involvement in the murder of a taxi driver in Medellín. Elkin Giovanny Rodriguez (Don Hector in the film) and Alex Bedoya (Milton) have also died. Some of them are still alive but living in tough conditions, such as Mileider Gil, who went on to play a small role in “Rosario Tijeras”.

== Plot ==
At Christmas time in Medellín, an impoverished teenager named Andrea runs away from her home after a family discussion and looks for Mónica, a rose seller who also ran away from her family after her grandmother died. In Barrio Triste, a poor and dangerous neighborhood, Mónica lives with a group of friends who are immersed in a life of drug use and prostitution. The group is composed of Diana, known as "Cachetona"; Judy, who prostitutes herself; and Claudia, who also sells roses. They live in a hostel for low-income individuals. At this time, Colombia is celebrating the Novena of aguinaldos, a Christmas Eve tradition.

A street gang led by Don Héctor discusses their next hits. After spotting a drug addict, the gang members Zarco and El Enano attack and rob him. However, Zarco returns with a gun and shoots him, an act that Don Héctor does not like at all.

In the city, Andrea starts selling roses like her friends while Judy prostitutes herself to buy clothes. While Mónica is selling her roses, a drunk man gives her a toy wristwatch; she thinks it is a gift from heaven sent by her mother. She plans to give it to her boyfriend Anderson, a young drug dealer. However, she breaks up with him after finding out that he was flirting with Marcela, Claudia's friend.

Andrea wanders the streets and is caught by a homeless man who tries to molest her. Choco and Zorro chase him away. They kill a homeless man who was dozing in a park after mistaking him for Andrea's attacker.

Mónica and Andrea return to Miramar; Andrea returns to her home but leaves again after stealing her sister's roller skates and picking up her clothes. Meanwhile, Don Héctor's gang are arguing about Zarco's behavior, which put the gang at risk. Mónica meets her cousin, El Enano, who asks her to show him the watch. Zarco arrives and sees the watch; he "exchanges" it for another of lower quality.

Mónica returns to her old home where she plans to spend Christmas Eve, but her aunt's husband tries to sexually abuse her while she takes a nap. She decides to leave again and spend Christmas Eve with her friends. Mónica contacts Chinga, a homeless boy, to steal some jewelry to get money for fireworks and clothing. Meanwhile, Andrea and Judy sell the roller skates, but Judy scams her, keeping more than half of the sale price. Andrea finds out about the trick and feels betrayed by Judy, but after Mónica confronts Judy, they talk, reach an amicable solution, and hug each other.

Meanwhile, the police are tracking Don Héctor's gang. Knowing that, they look for Zarco and tell him to hide, but he ignores the warning. Don Héctor threatens him and leaves. After that, Monica and Zarco meet again amidst the chaos of the neighborhood; she is frightened and runs away. However, he catches up to her and intimidates her. Zarco orders her to give him back the watch (which Mónica has already exchanged for some fireworks). Then he beats her and threatens to kill her later if she does not return it to him.

Later on, Diana's father comes to the hostel searching for her and convinces her to return home with him. She decides to leave and says goodbye to her friends, promising that if her parents beat her again, she will return to them.

Later on Christmas Eve night, Judy gets into the car of a hitman, who tries to sexually abuse her. She stabs him and runs away, but not before he injures her as well. Elsewhere, Anderson, Milton, Choco, and Zorro enjoy a party with Andrea. Anderson tries to seduce her while Choco's gang tries to steal a briefcase. They do not succeed, instead being shot at, with Milton ending up wounded in the encounter.

Mónica returns to Miramar with Judy and Andrea. They try to convince Mónica to spend Christmas with them, but Monica refuses to go with them; Judy and Andrea leave. When Andrea returns home, her mom tells her that she loves her and will treat her better and spend Christmas together.

Meanwhile, Zarco and El Enano rob a taxi driver who Zarco ends up stabbing, leaving him seriously injured. El Enano gets angry with Zarco, who responds by attacking him and cutting his hand. Wounded, he goes to Don Héctor and tells him what happened. Don Héctor thinks that El Zarco is a threat to the gang, and decides to go out looking for him and end his life.

Meanwhile, Mónica goes inside the house where she grew up, which is now in ruins, and starts hallucinating about her grandmother while under the influence of "Boxer", a brand of industrial glue. Zarco finds her and shoots her in the chest; she dies when her grandmother grabs Monica and takes her away from the pain. Afterwards, Zarco runs away from Don Hector's gang, but they find him and shoot him dead. The movie ends with a text that says: "This film is inspired by Hans Christian Andersen's story 'The Little Match-Seller' and the life of Mónica Rodríguez and the street children in Medellín."

== Cast ==
- Leidy Tabares — Mónica
- Marta Correa — Judy
- Mileider Gil — Andrea
- Diana Murillo — Cachetona
- Liliana Giraldo — Claudia
- Álex Bedoya — Milton
- Giovanni Quiroz — El Zarco

== Accolades ==
The movie won the Premio del Público award at the 39th Cartagena Film Festival, among other national prizes.

== See also ==
- Lady, la vendedora de rosas
- List of submissions to the 71st Academy Awards for Best Foreign Language Film
- List of Colombian submissions for the Academy Award for Best Foreign Language Film
