= La Villa brothers =

Marco and Mauro La Villa
- Born: December 27, 1971 (age 54)
- Occupation: Film directors
- Known for: Hang the DJ and Black and White Stripes: The Juventus Story
- Website: marcoandmaurolavilla.com easterncanal.com

Marco La Villa and Mauro La Villa are identical twin brothers who are directors and producers based in New York City.

Together, they co-directed and produced the 1998 music documentary Hang The DJ about the culture of DJs featuring Roger Sanchez, Junior Vasquez, DJ Qbert, Mix Master Mike, John "Jellybean" Benitez, Carl Cox, Kool DJ Red Alert and Claudio Coccoluto. It premiered at the 1998 Toronto International Film Festival in September 1998 and screened at multiple festivals including the International Documentary Film Festival Amsterdam.

They are known for their 2016 documentary film Black and White Stripes: The Juventus Story on Gianni Agnelli and the Italian football team Juventus FC "Trying to describe their subjects to the soccer-illiterate New York crowd, Marco La Villa said, "It would be like if the Kennedys owned the Yankees for 90 years."

== Filmography ==
- 2018 - Black and White Stripes: The Juventus Story
- 1998 - Hang the DJ
- 1995 - E Tutto Finito
- 1994 - Could'a Had Class
- 1994 - Sal the Barber: Framed
- 1993 - Headshot
- 1993 - Sleeping with the Fishes
- 1992 - Palookaville

== Bibliography ==
Books

- Molinari, Maurizio (2012). The Italians of New York (in Italian and English). Washington, D.C.: New Academia Publishing. ISBN 9780985569808.

Other Publications

- Sala, Giulio (November 2011). "La Juve in un film" (PDF). Hurrà Juventus (in Italian).
