= Rodrigo D: No Future =

1990 film

- Theatrical release poster
- Directed by: Víctor Gaviria
- Written by: Víctor Gaviria
- Produced by: Guillermo Calle; Ana María Trujillo
- Starring: Ramiro Meneses
- Cinematography: Rodrigo Lalinde
- Edited by: Alberto Restrepo
- Release date: May 1990
- Running time: 93 minutes
- Country: Colombia
- Language: Spanish

Rodrigo D: No Future (Spanish: Rodrigo D: no futuro) is a 1990 Colombian drama film written and directed by Víctor Gaviria. It was entered into the 1990 Cannes Film Festival.

== Cast ==
- Ramiro Meneses - Rodrigo D
- Carlos Mario Restrepo
- Jackson Idrian Gallego
- Vilma Díaz
- Óscar Hernández
- Irene de Galvis
- Wilson Blandón
- Leonardo Favio Sánchez
- Johana Hernández
- Oswaldo Ordoñez Carmona
