= Víctor Gaviria =

Colombian film director, writer and poet

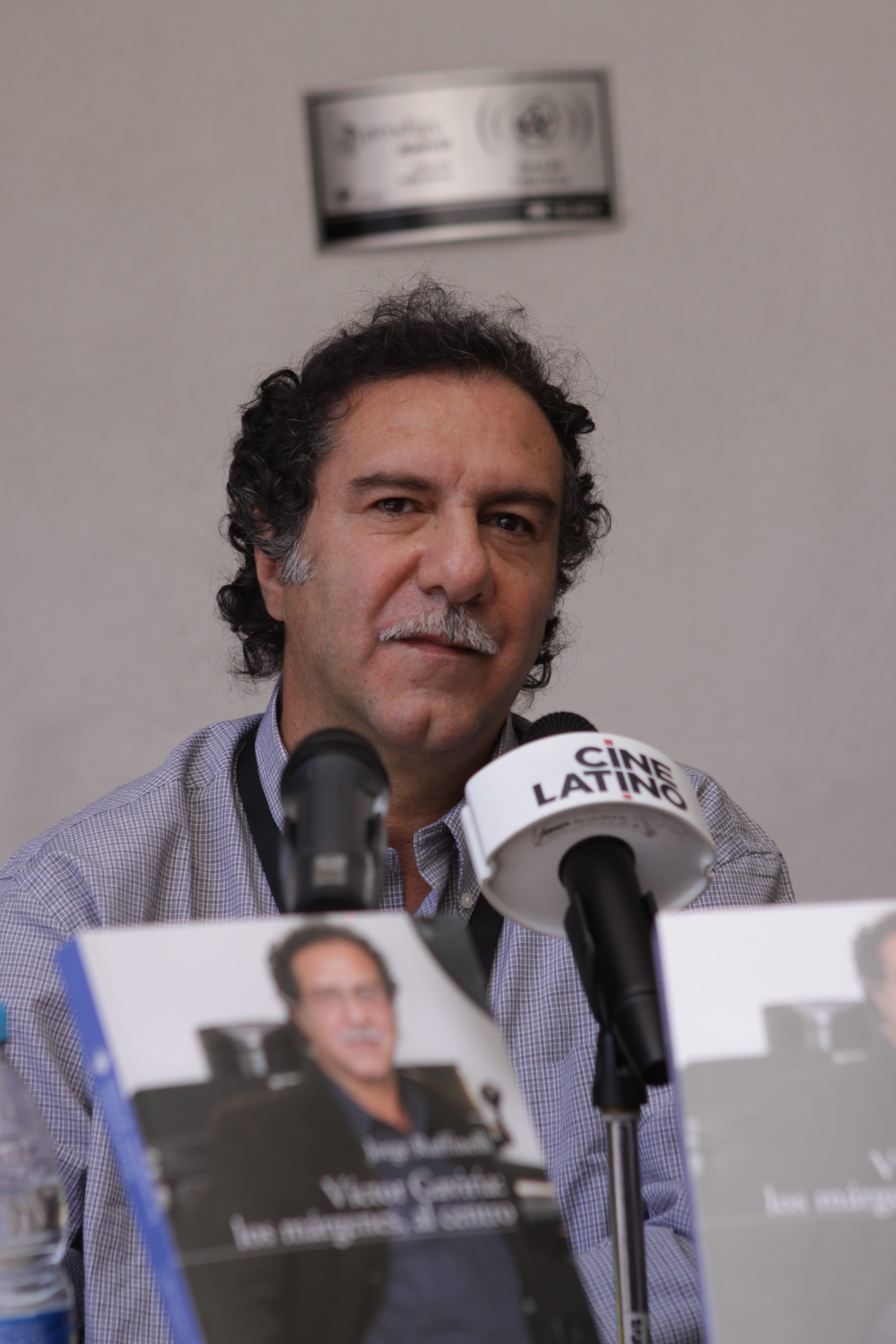
- Gaviria in 2009
- Born: Víctor Manuel Gaviria González; January 19, 1955 (age 71); Liborina, Antioquia, Colombia
- Education: University of Antioquia
- Occupations: Film director, writer, poet

Víctor Manuel Gaviria González (born January 19, 1955) is a Colombian film director, writer and poet. His four feature-length films are acclaimed and have won many international awards. He is the first Colombian filmmaker to be featured at the Cannes Film Festival.

== Early life ==
He was born on January 19, 1955 in the town of Liborina, Colombia, and raised in Medellín, the sixth of 8 siblings. He grew up during the beginning of the Colombian conflict; an ongoing civil war between the Colombian government and extremist groups and drug cartels, which led to immense violence and unrest throughout Medellín. He attended the University of Antioquia and earned a degree in psychology. Gaviria took interest in poetry, writing seven poetry books that won several awards.

He studied psychology at Antioquia University, but quit to pursue his film-making career. He joined several art collectives and met Catholic priest Luis Alberto Álvarez, who became a close friend and an important figure in his development.

== Career ==
He is known for his raw style in portraying social issues and exclusion. His method has influenced Colombian and Latin American cinema; presenting actors with no acting background, but who are natural storytellers and are actively involved in the development of the film.

== Films ==
Title	Year	Runtime
Buscando treboles	1980	8 min
Sueños sobre un mantel vacío	1980	9 min
La Lupa del Fin del Mundo	1981	20 min
El vagón rojo	1981	15 min
Los habitantes de la noche	1984	20 min
La vieja guardia	1984	25 min
Que pase el aserrador	1985	50 min
Los músicos 1986	1986	32 min
¿Quién escucha a Vieco?	1986	30 min
Los cuentos de Campo Valdés	1987	30 min
Urabá hoy: la recreación en Urabá	1988	48 min
Dario Lemos: Un retrato	1989	30 min
David y Roberto: Los polizones de Nueva Colonia	1989	27 min
Urabá hoy: Vereda La Balsa	1989	25 min
Lo que dañaba a mi hermano era la edad: La historia de Víctor Manuel Zúñiga	1989	31 min
Mamá Margarita	1990	30 min
El obispo llega el 15	1990	27 min
Yo te tumbo tu me tumbas	1990	60 min
Rodrigo D. No futuro	1990	90 min
El Paseo	1992	30 min
Los derechos del niño	1992	30 min
Mirar al muerto, por favor	1992	30 min
Simón el mago	1994	85 min
Muchachos a lo bien	1995	28 min
La mita - una vieja inolvidable	1995	22 min
La vendedora de rosas	1998	115 min
Poner a actuar pájaros	1998	90 min
Sumas y restas	2004	105 min
El gol que costó un muerto	2004	30 min
La marcha continúa	2013	78 min
La mujer del animal	2017	90 min

=== Awards ===
- Rodrigo D: No Future, 1990 (official selection at the 1990 Cannes Film Festival)
- La vendedora de rosas, 1998 (official selection at the 1998 Cannes Film Festival)
- Sumas y restas, 2004
- The Animal's Wife, 2016

== Books ==
Title	Year	Publisher
En la ciudad, alguien también perplejo	1978	Cúcuta: Instituto de Cultura y Bellas Artes
Con los que viajo sueño	1980	Universidad Externado de Colombia
La luna y la ducha fría	1980	Universidad de Antioquia
El campo al fin de cuentas no es tan verde	1982	Ediciones Acuarimántima: Ediciones Hombre Nuevo
El Pulso del cartógrafo	1986	Ediciones Autores Antioqueños
El pelaíto que no duró nada	1990/2020	Planeta / Seix Barral
El rey de los espantos	1993	Centro Editorial Universidad del Valle
El tío Miguel	1998	Norma
Los días del Olvidadizo	1998	Norma
La mañana del tiempo	2003	Hombre Nuevo Editores
Detrás de Cámara	2018	Pigmaleón
