= List of Narcos characters =

Narcos is an American crime drama television series about the Colombian drug cartels and the DEA's efforts to shut them down. It was created by Chris Brancato, Carlo Bernard and Doug Miro, and produced by Gaumont International Television and distributed by Netflix. Its companion series Narcos: Mexico was released after the original series ended.

The following list shows the characters who had appeared both series. Most of the cast of the first 2 seasons did not return in the third season, meanwhile Narcos: Mexico features a totally different cast, although some of the cast of the original series reprise their roles. Pedro Pascal is the only actor to have main appearance in all three seasons of the original series, while José María Yazpik and Alejandro Edda are the only actors to have main appearances in all three seasons of Narcos: Mexico. In addition, Alberto Ammann is the only actor to have appearances in all six seasons of both series combined.

== Overview ==
=== Main cast ===
= Main cast (credited)
= Recurring cast (3+)
= Guest cast (1-2)

Character	Portrayed by	Seasons					
Character	Portrayed by	Narcos			Narcos: Mexico		
Character	Portrayed by	1	2	3	1	2	3
Pablo Escobar	Wagner Moura	Main	Main		Guest		Guest
Steven Murphy	Boyd Holbrook	Main	Main				Guest
Javier Peña	Pedro Pascal	Main	Main	Main			
Connie Murphy	Joanna Christie	Main	Main				
Colonel Horacio Carrillo	Maurice Compte	Main	Recurring				
Jorge Ochoa	André Mattos	Main					
Fabio Ochoa	Robert Urbina	Main					
Juan Diego "La Quica" Díaz	Diego Cataño	Main	Recurring				
Roberto "Poison" Ramos	Jorge A. Jimenez	Main	Guest		Guest		
Tata Escobar	Paulina Gaitán	Main	Main				
Hermilda Gaviria	Paulina García	Main	Main				
Valeria Vélez	Stephanie Sigman	Main	Recurring				
Fernando Duque	Bruno Bichir	Main	Main				
César Gaviria	Raúl Méndez	Main	Main				
Eduardo Sandoval	Manolo Cardona	Main	Main				
Judy Moncada	Cristina Umaña	Guest	Main				
Bill Stechner	Eric Lange		Main	Main	Guest	Guest	
Claudia Messina	Florencia Lozano		Main				
Gilberto Rodriguez	Damián Alcázar		Main	Main			Guest
Helmer "Pacho" Herrera	Alberto Ammann	Recurring	Main	Main	Guest	Main	Main
Miguel Rodríguez Orejuela	Francisco Denis		Main	Main	Guest		
José "Chepe" Santacruz-Londoño	Pêpê Rapazote			Main	Guest		Guest
Jorge Salcedo Cabrera	Matias Varela			Main		Guest	
Guillermo Pallomari	Javier Cámara			Main			
David Rodríguez	Arturo Castro			Main			
María Salazar	Andrea Londo			Main			
Christina Jurado	Kerry Bishé			Main			
Chris Feistl	Michael Stahl-David			Main			
Daniel Van Ness	Matt Whelan			Main			
Amado Carrillo Fuentes	José María Yazpik			Main	Main	Main	Main
Kiki Camarena	Michael Peña				Main		
Miguel Ángel Félix Gallardo	Diego Luna				Main	Main	Guest
Rafael "Rafa" Caro Quintero	Tenoch Huerta				Main	Guest	
Mika Camarena	Alyssa Diaz				Main		
Ernesto "Don Neto" Fonseca Carrillo	Joaquín Cosío				Main	Guest	Recurring
James "Jaime" Kuykendall	Matt Letscher				Main	Guest	Main
Salvador Osuna Nava	Ernesto Alterio				Main		
Joaquín "El Chapo" Guzmán	Alejandro Edda				Main	Main	Main
Maria Elvira	Fernanda Urrejola				Main	Main	
Isabella Bautista	Teresa Ruiz				Main	Main	
Butch Sears	Aaron Staton				Main		
Roger Knapp	Lenny Jacobson				Main		
Pablo Acosta	Gerardo Taracena				Main	Main	
Guillermo González Calderoni	Julio Cesar Cedillo				Main	Main	
Walt Breslin	Scoot McNairy				Recurring	Main	Main
Benjamín Arellano Félix	Alfonso Dosal				Recurring	Main	Main
Enedina Arellano Félix	Mayra Hermosillo					Main	Main
Ramón Arellano Félix	Manuel Masalva				Recurring	Main	Main
Danilo Garza	Miguel Rodarte					Main	
Kenny Moss	Alex Knight				Guest	Main	
Sal Orozco	Jesse Garcia					Main	
Daryl Petsky	Matt Biedel					Main	
Ossie Mejía	Jero Medina					Main	
Amat Palacios	Alberto Zeni					Main	
Héctor Luis Palma Salazar	Gorka Lasaosa				Recurring	Main	Main
Enrique Clavel	Andres Londono					Main	
Juan García Abrego	Flavio Medina					Main	Main
Victor Tapia	Luis Gerardo Méndez						Main
Andrea Nuñez	Luisa Rubino						Main
Jesús Gutiérrez Rebollo	José Zúñiga						Main
Steve Sheridan	Beau Mirchoff						Main
Dani	Kristen Gutoskie						Main
David Barron Corona	Bobby Soto					Recurring	Main
Alex Hodoyan	Lorenzo Ferro						Main
Ramon Salgado	Alejandro Furth						Main
Ismael "El Mayo" Zambada	Alberto Guerra						Main

=== Recurring cast ===
= Recurring cast (3+)
= Guest cast (1-2)

Character	Portrayed by	Seasons					
Character	Portrayed by	Narcos			Narcos: Mexico		
Character	Portrayed by	1	2	3	1	2	3
Gonzalo Rodríguez Gacha	Luis Guzmán	Recurring					
Gustavo Gaviria	Juan Pablo Raba	Recurring	Guest				
Carlos Lehder	Juan Riedinger	Recurring					
CIA Officer	Richard T. Jones	Recurring	Guest				
Elisa Álvarez	Ana de la Reguera	Recurring					
Ambassador Noonan	Danielle Kennedy	Recurring					
Colonel Lou Wysession	Patrick St. Esprit	Recurring	Guest				
Diana Turbay	Gabriela de la Garza	Recurring					
Sureshot	Ariel Sierra	Recurring	Guest				
Nelson "El Negrito" Hernández	Julián Díaz	Recurring	Recurring		Guest		
Marta Ochoa	Carolina Gaitán	Recurring					
Agent Owen	Thaddeus Phillips	Recurring	Guest				
Juan Pablo Escobar	Juan Sebastian Murcia	Recurring	Recurring				
Trujillo	Jorge Monterrosa	Recurring	Recurring	Guest			
Alberto Suarez	Julián Beltrán	Recurring					
Fernando Galeano	Orlando Valenzuela	Recurring					
Kiko Moncada	Christian Tappan	Recurring					
Marina Ochoa	Laura Perico	Recurring					
Ana Gaviria	Vera Mercado	Recurring	Guest				
Navegante	Juan Sebastián Calero	Recurring	Recurring	Recurring		Recurring	
Limón	Leynar Gómez		Recurring				
Maritza	Martina García		Recurring				
Ambassador Arthur Crosby	Brett Cullen		Recurring	Recurring			
Edward Jacoby	Konstantin Melikhov		Recurring				
Velasco	Alejandro Buitrago	Guest	Recurring				
Jairo	Jairo Ordoñez	Guest	Recurring				
Diego "Don Berna" Murillo Bejarano	Mauricio Cujar		Recurring	Guest			
Ricardo Prisco	Federico Rivera		Recurring				
Manuela Escobar	María José Sanchez	Guest	Recurring				
Carlos Castaño Gil	Mauricio Mejía		Recurring	Guest			
Fidel Castaño	Gustavo Angarita Jr.		Recurring	Guest			
Gustavo de Greiff	Germán Jaramillo		Recurring				
Colonel Hugo Martínez	Juan Pablo Shuk		Recurring	Recurring			
Hugo Martinez Jr.	Sebastián Vega		Recurring				
General Diego Vargas	Álvaro García		Recurring	Recurring			
Franklin Jurado	Miguel Ángel Silvestre			Recurring			
Carlo Córdova	Andrés Crespo			Recurring			
Flaco	Arnold Cantillo			Recurring			
Orlando Henao Montoya	Julián Arango			Recurring		Guest	Guest
Enrique	Carrell Lasso			Recurring			
Claudio Salazar	Carlos Camacho			Recurring			
Dario	Roberto Cano			Recurring			
Manuel	Maurho Jimenez			Recurring			Guest
Agent Neil Stoddard	Raymond Ablack			Recurring			
Paola Salcedo	Taliana Vargas			Recurring			
Vera Salcedo	Juana Álvarez			Recurring			
Patricía Pallomari	Lina Castrillón			Recurring			
Wilber Varela	Girolly Gutiérrez			Recurring		Guest	
Carolina Álvarez	Margarita Rosa de Francisco			Recurring			
Alma Salcedo	Bella Barragán			Recurring			
Nicolas Rodriguez	Sebastián Eslava			Recurring			
Alvaro Herrera	Edgar Prada			Recurring			
Fernando Botero Zea	Luis Mesa			Recurring			
General Rosso José Serrano	Gastón Velandia			Recurring			
Juan José "El Azul" Esparragoza Moreno	Fermin Martinez				Recurring	Recurring	Recurring
Tomas Morlet	Horacio Garcia Rojas				Recurring		
Sammy Alvarez	Memo Villegas				Recurring		
Cochiloco	Andrés Almeida				Recurring	Recurring	
Governor Leopoldo Celis	Rodrigo Murray				Recurring		
Comandante Méndez	Edison Ruiz				Recurring		
Humberto Machaín	Emilio Guerrero				Recurring	Guest	
Kiki Camarena Jr.	Alessandro Borrelli				Recurring		
Miguel Gallardo Jr.	Jonathan Ochoa				Recurring	Recurring	
Abril Gallardo	Ivana Plantier				Recurring	Recurring	
Suzy	Natasha Esca				Recurring		
Falcón	Luis Roberto Guzmán				Recurring		
Cuco	Edmundo Vargas				Recurring		
Francisco Rafael Arellano Félix	Francisco Barreiro				Recurring	Recurring	Recurring
Sofia Conesa	Tessa Ía				Recurring		
Tony	Mark Kubr				Recurring		
Juan Matta-Ballesteros	Vladimir Cruz				Recurring	Guest	
Manuel Torres Félix	Joshua Okamoto				Recurring		
Ed Heath	Clark Freeman				Recurring	Recurring	
Thomas Buehl	Mike Doyle				Recurring		
Ana Kuykendall	Tania Arredondo				Recurring		
John Gavin	Yul Vazquez				Recurring		
Mr. X / Andrés	Alejandro Bracho				Recurring	Recurring	Guest
Ruben Zuno Arce	Milton Cortés				Guest	Recurring	
Guadalupe "Lupita" Leija Serrano	Viviana Serna					Recurring	
Juan Nepomuceno Guerra	Jesús Ochoa					Recurring	Guest
Mimi Webb Miller	Sosie Bacon					Recurring	
Javier Arellano Félix	José Julián					Recurring	Recurring
Eduardo Arellano Félix	Sebastián Buitrón					Recurring	Recurring
Daniela Gallardo	Alejandra Guilmant				Guest	Recurring	
Rafael Aguilar Guajardo	Noé Hernández					Recurring	Guest
Marco De Haro	Alfonso Borbolla					Recurring	
Isabel Arellano Félix	Luna Beltran					Recurring	Recurring
Alicia María Arellano Félix	Marilyn Uribe					Recurring	Recurring
Manny	Erick Israel Consuelo					Recurring	Recurring
Carlos Salinas de Gortari	Adolfo Madera					Recurring	Guest
Raúl Salinas de Gortari	Mauricio Isaac					Recurring	Guest
Cecilia Rosado	Mariana Treviño					Recurring	
Carlos Hank Gonzalez	Manuel Uriza						Recurring
Hortencia Tapia	Damayanti Quintanar						Recurring
Craig Mills	James Earl						Recurring
Everardo Arturo “Kitty” Paez	Benito Martínez Ocasio						Recurring
Marta Linares	Yessica Borroto						Recurring
Jack Dorian	Eric Etebari						Recurring
Rogelio	Markin López						Recurring
Ruth Arellano Félix	Adriana Llabrés					Guest	Recurring
Alfredo Hodoyan	Iván Aragón						Recurring
Marcos Santos	Francisco Rubio						Recurring
Claudio Vazquez	Claudio Lafarga						Recurring
Isabella	Ana Cecilia Azuela						Recurring
Isaac	Nicolás de Llaca						Recurring
Arturo Beltrán Leyva	Diego Calva						Recurring
Vicente Carrillo Fuentes	Fernando Bonilla						Recurring
Gerardo Corral	Eugenio Rubio						Recurring

== Main characters ==
=== Introduced in Narcos ===
==== Pablo Escobar ====
Pablo Escobar played by Wagner Moura (seasons 1-2), Colombian drug lord and head of the Medellín Cartel. He is married to Tata and has a close relationship with his mother and his cousin, Gustavo. Moura also made guest appearances in the first and third seasons of Narcos: Mexico.

==== Steven Murphy ====
Steven Murphy played by Boyd Holbrook (seasons 1-2), a DEA agent assigned to Colombia. He is married to Connie who has trouble adjusting to their life in Colombia. He serves as the narrator for the first two seasons of Narcos.

==== Javier Peña ====
Javier Peña played by Pedro Pascal (seasons 1-3), a DEA agent and Murphy’s partner. He serves as the narrator for the third season and final season of Narcos.

==== Connie Murphy ====
Connie Murphy played by Joanna Christie (seasons 1-2), Steve’s wife, a nurse who works at a local hospital in Colombia.

==== Colonel Carrillo ====
Colonel Horacio Carrillo played by Maurice Compte (season 1; recurring season 2), colonel of the Republic of Colombia and leader of the Search Bloc police unit.

==== Jorge Ochoa ====
Jorge Ochoa played by André Mattos (season 1), founding member and former leader of the Medellín cartel.

==== Fabio Ochoa ====
Fabio Ochoa played by Robert Urbina (season 1), a founding member and former leadership of the Medellín cartel and Jorge’s brother.

==== La Quica ====
Juan Diego "La Quica" Díaz played by Diego Cataño (season 1; recurring season 2), an assassin working for the Medellín cartel.

==== Poison ====
Roberto "Poison" Ramos played by Julian Diaz (season 1; guest season 2), a hit man hired by the Medellín cartel. Diaz also made a guest appearance in the first season of Narcos: Mexico.

==== Tata Escobar ====
Tata Escobar played by Paulina Gaitán (seasons 1-2), Pablo Escobar’s wife and mother of his two children.

==== Hermilda Gaviria ====
Hermilda Gaviria played by Paulina García (seasons 1-2), Pablo’s mother who he has a close relationship to.

==== Valeria Vélez ====
Valeria Vélez played by Stephanie Sigman (season 1; recurring season 2), a Colombian journalist who is Escobar’s mistress.

==== Fernando Duque ====
Fernando Duque played by Bruno Bichir (seasons 1-2), a Colombian lawyer representing Pablo Escobar.

==== César Gaviria ====
César Gaviria played by Raúl Méndez (seasons 1-2), a Colombian politician who becomes the 28th President of Colombia.

==== Eduardo Sandoval ====
Eduardo Sandoval played by Manolo Cardona (seasons 1-2), the Vice Minister of Justice for President Gaviria’s administration.

==== Judy Moncada ====
Judy Moncada played by Cristina Umaña (season 2; guest season 1), a former leader of the Medellín cartel who wants revenge on Pablo Escobar for the murder of her husband. She is a founding member of the Los Pepes hit squad, designed to destroy Escobar’s organization.

==== Bill Stechner ====
Bill Stechner played by Eric Lange (seasons 2-3), the CIA station chief in Colombia. Lange also made guest appearances in the first and second seasons of Narcos: Mexico.

==== Claudia Messina ====
Claudia Messina played by Florencia Lozano (season 2), a high-ranking DEA agent who acts as Murphy and Peña’s supervisor.

==== Gilberto Rodriguez ====
Gilberto Rodriguez played by Damián Alcázar (seasons 2-3), leader of the Cali cartel and one of Escobar’s primary rivals. Alcázar also made a guest appearance in the third season of Narcos: Mexico.

==== Pacho Herrera ====
Helmer "Pacho" Herrera played by Alberto Ammann (seasons 2-3; recurring season 1), a leader of the Cali cartel with connections to the Mexican drug trade. Ammann also made a guest appearance in the first season of Narcos: Mexico and was a series regular for seasons 2 and 3.

==== Miguel Rodriguez Orejuela ====
Miguel Rodriguez Orejuela played by Francisco Denis (seasons 2-3), a leader and founding member of the Cali cartel and Gilberto’s brother. Denis also made a guest appearance in the first season of Narcos: Mexico.

==== Chepe Santacruz ====
José "Chepe" Santacruz-Londoño played by Pêpê Rapazote (season 3), a leader and founding member of the Cali cartel who oversees their operation in New York. Rapazote also made guest appearances in first and third seasons of Narcos: Mexico.

==== Jorge Salcedo Cabrera ====
Jorge Salcedo Cabrera played by Matias Varela (season 3), head of security for the Cali cartel. Varela also made a guest appearance in the second season of Narcos: Mexico.

==== Guillermo Palomari ====
Guillermo Palomari played by Javier Cámara (season 3), the chief accountant for the Cali cartel.

==== David Rodríguez ====
David Rodríguez played by Arturo Castro (season 3), an enforcer for the Cali cartel and Miguel’s son.

==== María Salazar ====
María Salazar played by Andrea Londo (season 3), the wife of a Colombian drug lord affiliated with the North Valley cartel. She becomes romantically involved with Miguel.

==== Christina Jurado ====
Christina Jurado played by Kerry Bishé (season 3), the American wife of a banker associated with the Cali cartel who becomes a target for the DEA.

==== Chris Feistl ====
Chris Feistl played by Michael Stahl-David (season 3), a DEA agent working under Peña.

==== Daniel Van Ness ====
Daniel Van Ness played by Matt Whelan (season 3), a DEA agent partnered with Feistl.

==== Amado Carrillo Fuentes ====
Amado Carrillo Fuentes played by José María Yazpik (season 3), a Mexican drug lord known as the "Lord of the Skies". He is business partners with Pacho and Félix and is Don Neto’s nephew. Yazpik was also a series regular for all three seasons of Narcos: Mexico.

=== Introduced in Narcos: Mexico ===
==== Kiki Camarena ====
Enrique "Kiki" Camarena Salazar played by Michael Peña (season 1), a DEA agent who garners intel on Félix’s rising organization. He is married to Mika and together they have three children.

==== Miguel Ángel Félix Gallardo ====
Miguel Ángel Félix Gallardo played by Diego Luna (seasons 1-2; guest season 3), the leader and founder of the Guadalajara Cartel, who pioneered the modern Mexican drug trade.

==== Rafael Caro Quintero ====
Rafael "Rafa" Caro Quintero played by Tenoch Huerta (season 1; guest season 2), Félix’s friend and business partner, he is a founding member of the Guadalajara cartel.

==== Mika Camarena ====
Mika Camarena played by Alyssa Diaz (season 1), Kiki’s wife who is pregnant with their third child when he gets stationed to Guadalajara.

==== Don Neto ====
Ernesto "Don Neto" Fonseca Carrillo played by Joaquín Cosío (season 1; guest season 2; recurring season 3), Félix’s business partner and founding member of the Guadalajara cartel. He is Amado’s uncle and mentor.

==== Jaime Kuykendall ====
James "Jaime" Kuykendall played by Matt Letscher (seasons 1 & 3; guest season 2), head of the Guadalajara bureau of the DEA and Kiki’s supervisor.

==== Salvador Osuna Nava ====
Salvador Osuna Nava played by Ernesto Alterio (season 1), Director-General of the Mexican Dirección Federal de Seguridad who becomes associated with Félix.

==== El Chapo ====
Joaquín "El Chapo" Guzmán played by Alejandro Edda (seasons 1-3), a member of the Sinaloa cartel who begins rising the ranks of the drug trade.

==== Maria Elvira ====
Maria Elvira played by Fernanda Urrejola (seasons 1-2), Félix’s wife and the daughter of a Mexican drug lord.

==== Isabella Bautista ====
Isabella Bautista played by Teresa Ruiz (seasons 1-2), Félix’s friend and business associate.

==== Butch Sears ====
Butch Sears played by Aaron Staton (season 1), a DEA agent stationed in Guadalajara.

==== Roger Knapp ====
Roger Knapp played by Lenny Jacobson (season 1), a DEA agent stationed in Guadalajara.

==== Pablo Acosta ====
Pablo Acosta played by Gerardo Taracena (seasons 1-2), the leader of the Juarez Cartel.

==== Commander González Calderoni ====
Commander Guillermo González Calderoni played by Julio Cesar Cedillo (seasons 1-2), the commander of the Mexican Federal Judicial Police.

==== Walt Breslin ====
Walt Breslin played by Scoot McNairy (seasons 2-3; recurring season 1), a DEA agent and the leader of Operation Leyenda. He serves as the narrator of the first two seasons of Narcos: Mexico.

==== Benjamín Arellano Félix ====
Benjamín Arellano Félix played by Alfonso Dosal (seasons 2-3; recurring season 1), the leader of the Tijuana Cartel, Enedina and Ramón’s older brother.

==== Enedina Arellano Félix ====
Enedina Arellano Félix played by Mayra Hermosillo (seasons 2-3), a high-ranking member of the Tijuana cartel, Benjamín and Ramón’s sister. She initially begins an alliance with Isabella, before joining her family’s business.

==== Ramón Arellano Félix ====
Ramón Arellano Félix played by Manuel Masalva (seasons 2-3; recurring season 1), an enforcer and high-ranking member of the Tijuana cartel, Benjamín and Enedina’s younger brother.

==== Danilo Garza ====
Danilo Garza played by Miguel Rodarte (season 2), a Mexican police officer and member of Operation Leyenda.

==== Kenny Moss ====
Kenny Moss played by Alex Knight (season 2; guest season 1), a DEA agent and member of Operation Leyenda.

==== Sal Orozco ====
Sal Orozco played by Jesse Garcia (season 2), a DEA agent and member of Operation Leyenda.

==== Daryl Petsky ====
Daryl Petsky played by Matt Biedel (season 2), a DEA agent and member of Operation Leyenda.

==== Ossie Mejía ====
Ossie Mejía played by Jero Medina (season 2), a Mexican police officer and member of Operation Leyenda.

==== Amat Palacios ====
Amat Palacios played by Alberto Zeni (season 2), a Mexican police officer and member of Operation Leyenda.

==== Héctor Luis Palma Salazar ====
Héctor Luis "El Güero" Palma Salazar played by Gorka Lasaosa (seasons 2-3; recurring season 1), a high-ranking member and sometimes leader of the Sinaloa cartel.

==== Enrique Clavel ====
Enrique Clavel played by Andres Londono (season 2), Félix’s right-hand man who becomes involved with Guadalupe, Salazar’s wife.

==== Juan García Abrego ====
Juan García Abrego played by Flavio Medina (seasons 2-3), the leader of the Gulf cartel and Guerra’s nephew.

==== Victor Tapia ====
Victor Tapia played by Luis Gerardo Méndez (season 3), a Juarez police officer who becomes drawn to series of killings involving young women.

==== Andrea Nuñez ====
Andrea Nuñez played by Luisa Rubino (season 3), a young journalist investigating the activities of the cartels for "La Voz de Tijuana". She serves as the narrator for the third and final season of Narcos: Mexico.

==== General Rebollo ====
General Jesús Gutiérrez Rebollo played by Jose Zuniga (season 3), a Mexican military general working against the cartels.

==== Steve Sheridan ====
Steve Sheridan played by Beau Mirchoff (season 3), a DEA agent working under Kuykendall.

==== Dani ====
Dani played by Kristen Gutoskie (season 3), Walt’s girlfriend who is reluctant in their relationship.

==== David Barron Corona ====
David Barron Corona played by Bobby Soto (season 3; recurring season 2), a high-ranking member of the Logan Heights Gang and hit-man for the Tijuana cartel.

==== Alex Hodoyan ====
Alex Hodoyan played by Lorenzo Ferro (season 3), a member of Ramón's Narcojuniors gang, a group composed of young rich kids who act as enforcers for the Tijuana cartel.

==== Ramon Salgado ====
Ramon Salgado played by Alejandro Furth (season 3), co-founder of "La Voz de Tijuana" and Andrea's boss.

==== El Mayo ====
Ismael "El Mayo" Zambada played by Alberto Guerra (season 3), an independent drug trafficker who uses his fishing business as a front. His business becomes an asset to the competing cartels.

== Recurring characters ==
=== Introduced in Narcos ===
==== Recurring guest stars ====
- Gonzalo Rodriguez Gacha played by Luis Guzmán (season 1), a founding member and former leader of the Medellín cartel.
- Gustavo Gaviria played by Juan Pablo Raba (season 1; guest season 2), Pablo’s cousin and right-hand man. He is a founding member of the Medellín cartel.
- Carlos Lehder played by Juan Riedinger (season 1), a drug trafficker and high-ranking member of the Medellín cartel.
- CIA officer played by Richard T. Jones (season 1; guest season 2), a member of Murphy’s task force.
- Elisa Álvarez played by Ana de la Reguera (season 1), the co-leader of guerrilla faction 19th of April Movement (M-19).
- Ambassador Noonan played by Danielle Kennedy (season 1), the United States Ambassador deployed to Colombia under President Ronald Reagan.
- Colonel Lou Wysession played by Patrick St. Esprit (season 1; guest season 2), a U.S. Marine Corps colonel and leader of a military group in Colombia.
- Diana Turbay played by Gabriela de la Garza (season 1), a Colombian journalist kidnapped by the Medellín cartel.
- Limón played by Leynar Gómez (season 2), a taxi driver from Medellín who becomes Escobar's personal driver and one of his sicarios, based on Alvaro de Jesús Agudelo (El Limón).
- Maritza played by Martina García (season 2), a young mother and an old friend of Limón's who gets roped into unwittingly helping Escobar.
- Ambassador Arthur Crosby played by Brett Cullen (seasons 2-3), Noonan’s replacement as the American Ambassador in Colombia.
- Edward Jacoby played by Konstantin Melikhov (season 2), a U.S. intelligence officer attached to Centra Spike.
- Franklin Jurado played by Miguel Angel Silvestre (season 3), Christina’s husband and a banker associated with the Cali cartel.

==== Recurring co-stars ====
- Sureshot played by Ariel Sierra (season 1; guest season 2), a sicario for the Medellín cartel.
- Nelson "El Negrito" Hernández played by Julián Díaz (seasons 1-2), an enforcer for Pablo Escobar. He is also referred to as "Blackie" and is based on Jorge "El Negro" Pabón. Díaz also makes a guest appearance on the first season of Narcos: Mexico.
- Marta Ochoa played by Carolina Gaitán (season 1), Jorge and Fabio’s younger sister who is kidnapped by M-19.
- Agent Owen played by Thaddeus Phillips (season 1; guest season 2), a CIA agent and member of Murphy’s task force.
- Luis Carlos Galán played by Juan Pablo Espinosa (season 1), a Colombian politician who ran for the Presidency of Colombia.
- Juan Pablo Escobar played by Juan Sebastian Murcia (seasons 1-2), Pablo and Tata’s eldest son.
- Trujillo played by Jorge Monterrosa (seasons 1-2; guest season 3), a Colombian police officer who assists the task force.
- Alberto Suarez played by Julián Beltrán (season 1), a corrupt Colombian police officer.
- Fernando Galeano played by Orlando Valenzuela (season 1), a high-ranking member of the Medellín cartel in charge of distribution.
- Kiko Moncada played by Christian Tappan (season 1), Judy’s husband and a high-ranking member of the Medellín cartel partnered with Fernando.
- Marina Ochoa played by Laura Perico (season 1), Jorge and Fabio’s younger sister who becomes romantically involved with Gustavo.
- Ana Gaviria played by Vera Mercado (season 1; guest season 2), Cesar’s wife and First Lady of Colombia.
- Navegante played by Juan Sebastián Calero (seasons 1-3), a high-ranking member and assassin for the Cali cartel. Calero also has a recurring role in the second season of Narcos: Mexico.
- Velasco played by Alejandro Buitrago (season 2; guest season 1), a lieutenant for the Medellín cartel.
- Jairo played by Jairo Ordoñez (season 2; guest season 1), a sicario for the Medellín cartel.
- Diego "Don Berna" Murillo Bejarano played by Mauricio Cujar (season 2; guest season 3), a former associate of Pablo Escobar allied with Judy Moncada. He is a founding member of Los Pepes.
- Ricardo Prisco played by Federico Rivera (season 2), a Colombian doctor and leader of the Los Priscos criminal organization.
- Manuela Escobar played by María José Sanchez (season 2; guest season 1), Pablo and Tata’s youngest daughter.
- Carlos Castaño Gil played by Mauricio Mejía (season 2; guest season 3), a Colombian paramilitary leader and founding member of Los Pepes.
- Fidel Castaño played by Gustavo Angarita Jr. (season 2; guest season 3), a Colombian paramilitary leader, Carlos’ brother, and a founding member of Los Pepes.
- Gustavo de Greiff played by Germán Jaramillo (season 2), Attorney General of Colombia during Gaviria’s administration.
- Colonel Hugo Martínez played by Juan Pablo Shuk (seasons 2-3), a Colombian police colonel and new commander of the Search Bloc.
- Hugo Martinez Jr. played by Sebastián Vega (season 2), a Colombian police officer and Colonel Martinez’s son.
- General Diego Vargas played by Alvaro García (seasons 2-3), General of the Colombian National Police.
- Carlo Córdova played by Andrés Crespo (season 3), former head of security for the Cali cartel who employed Jorge Salcedo.
- Flaco played by Arnold Cantillo (season 3), an enforcer for the Cali cartel.
- Orlando Henao Montoya played by Julian Arango (season 3), leader of the North Valley cartel. Arango also makes guest appearances in the second and third seasons of Narcos: Mexico.
- Enrique played by Carrell Lasso (season 3), a member of the Cali cartel’s security team.
- Claudio Salazar played by Carlos Camacho (season 3), a high-ranking member of the North Valley cartel.
- Dario played by Roberto Cano (season 3), a sicario for the Cali cartel and David’s right-hand man.
- Manuel played by Maurho Jimenez (season 3), Pacho’s lover. Jimenez also makes a guest appearance in the third season of Narcos: Mexico.
- Agent Neil Stoddard played by Raymond Ablack (season 3), the DEA deputy country attaché stationed in Colombia.
- Paola Salcedo played by Taliana Vargas (season 3), Jorge Salcedo’s wife and a Colombian lawyer.
- Vera Salcedo played by Juana Álvarez (season 3), Jorge and Paola’s daughter.
- Patricía Pallomari played by Lina Castrillón (season 3), Guillermo’s wife who is unfaithful in their marriage.
- Wilber Varela played by Girolly Gutiérrez (season 3), a high-ranking member of the North Valley cartel and Orlando’s right-hand man. Gutiérrez also makes a guest appearance in the second season of Narcos: Mexico.
- Carolina Álvarez played by Margarita Rosa de Francisco (season 3), a Colombian journalist who assists Peña against the Cali cartel.
- Alma Salcedo played by Bella Barragán (season 3), Jorge and Paola’s daughter.
- Nicolas Rodriguez played by Sebastián Eslava (season 3), Gilberto’s son and a lawyer who works for the Cali cartel.
- Alvaro Herrera played by Edgar Prada (season 3), Pacho’s younger brother.
- Fernando Botero Zea played by Luis Mesa (season 3), Minister of Defense in Colombia under President Ernesto Samper.
- General Rosso José Serrano played by Gastón Velandia (season 3), a former Colombian police general and a Commander of the Search Bloc.

=== Introduced in Narcos: Mexico ===
==== Recurring guest stars ====
- Juan José "El Azul" Esparragoza Moreno played by Fermin Martinez (seasons 1-3), a co-founder of the Guadalajara cartel and a former Director-General of the DFS.
- Cochiloco played by Andrés Almeida (seasons 1-2), a Mexican drug trafficker working for the Guadalajara cartel.
- Francisco Rafael Arellano Félix played by Francisco Barreiro (seasons 1-3), the eldest brother of Arellano Felix family and a high-ranking member of the Tijuana cartel.
- Ed Heath played by Clark Freeman (seasons 1-2), Director of Operations of the DEA in Mexico.
- Humberto Álvarez Machaín / Doctor Delgado played by Emilio Guerrero (season 1; guest season 2), a Mexican physician involved in the torture of Agent Camarena.
- Juan Matta-Ballesteros played by Vladimir Cruz (season 1; guest season 2), a Honduran drug trafficker who connected the Colombian cocaine trade with the Mexican drug cartels.
- Mr. X / Andrés played by Alejandro Bracho (seasons 1-2; guest season 3), the Mexican Secretary of Defense who provided protection for the Guadalajara cartel.
- Ruben Zuno Arce played by Milton Cortés (season 2; guest season 1), a wealthy Mexican businessman and Andrés’ nephew. He is associated with the Guadalajara cartel and was involved in Agent Camarena’s murder.
- Guadalupe "Lupita" Leija Serrano played by Viviana Serna (season 2), Héctor’s wife and Enrique’s lover.
- Juan Nepomuceno Guerra played by Jesús Ochoa (season 2; guest season 3), the founder and co-leader of the Gulf cartel and Abrego’s uncle.
- Mimi Webb Miller played by Sosie Bacon (season 2), an American rancher and Pablo Acosta’s love interest.
- Javier Arellano Félix played by José Julián (seasons 2-3), the youngest of the Arellano Felix siblings and an enforcer for the Tijuana cartel.
- Eduardo Arellano Félix played by Sebastián Buitrón (seasons 2-3), a member of the Arellano Felix family and a high-ranking member of the Tijuana cartel.
- Carlos Hank Gonzalez played by Manuel Uriza (season 3), a Mexican politician and influential businessman.
- Hortencia Tapia played by Damayanti Quintanar (season 3), Victor’s wife who works in a factory.
- Craig Mills played by James Earl (season 3), a DEA agent and Sheridan’s partner.
- Everardo Arturo “Kitty” Paez played by Benito Antonio Martinez Ocasio (season 3), an enforcer for the Tijuana cartel and a member of Ramon’s "Narcojuniors" gang.
- Marta Linares played by Yessica Borroto (season 3), a Cuban nightclub performer and Amado’s love interest.
- Jack Dorian played by Eric Etebari (season 3), head of the Tijuana bureau of the DEA.

==== Recurring co-stars ====
- Tomas Morlet played by Horacio García Rojas (season 1), a corrupt Mexican DFS agent working under Nava.
- Sammy Alvarez played by Memo Villegas (season 1), a former Mexican police officer and Don Neto’s right-hand man.
- Governor Leopoldo Celis played by Rodrigo Murray (season 1), Governor of Sinaloa and a member of the PRI.
- Comandante Méndez played by Edison Ruiz (season 1), a Mexican Federal Judicial Police officer.
- Kiki Camarena Jr. played by Alessandro Borrelli (season 1), Kiki and Mika’s oldest son.
- Miguel Gallardo Jr. played by Jonathan Ochoa (seasons 1-2), Félix and Maria’s son.
- Abril Gallardo played by Ivana Plantier (seasons 1-2), Félix and Maria’s daughter.
- Suzy played by Natasha Esca (season 1), the receptionist at the DEA’s Guadalajara office.
- Falcón played by Luis Roberto Guzmán (season 1), a Cuban drug lord operating in Mexico and Félix’s rival.
- Cuco played by Edmundo Vargas (season 1), Rafa’s right-hand man and a member of the Guadalajara cartel.
- Sofia Conesa played by Tessa Ia (season 1), the daughter of the Mexican Secretary of Education and Rafa’s love interest.
- Tony played by Mark Kubr (season 1), an American Vietnam War veteran who works as a personal bodyguard for various drug lords.
- Manuel Torres Félix played by Joshua Okamoto (season 1), a high-ranking member of the Sinaloa cartel.
- Thomas Buehl played by Mike Doyle (season 1), an American accountant living in Texas who manages Félix’s finances.
- Ana Kuykendall played by Tania Arredondo (season 1), Jaime’s wife.
- John Gavin played by Yul Vazquez (season 1), the United States Ambassador to Mexico.
- Daniela Gallardo played by Alejandra Guilmant (season 2; guest season 1), Félix’s mistress. She later becomes his wife after his divorce from Maria.
- Rafael Aguilar Guajardo played by Noé Hernández (season 2; guest season 3), a founding member of the Juarez cartel.
- Marco De Haro played by Alfonso Borbolla (season 2), Pablo Acosta’s head of security.
- Isabel Arellano Félix played by Luna Beltran (seasons 2-3), a member of the Arellano Félix family and the Tijuana cartel.
- Alicia María Arellano Félix played by Marilyn Uribe (seasons 2-3), a member of the Arellano Félix family and money launderer for the Tijuana cartel.
- Manny played by Erick Israel Consuelo (seasons 2-3), Amado’s right-hand man and a member of the Juarez cartel.
- President Elect / Carlos Salinas de Gortari played by Adolfo Madera (season 2; guest season 3), President Elect of Mexico and a member of the PRI. Credited only as "President Elect".
- The Brother / Raúl Salinas de Gortari played by Mauricio Isaac (season 2; guest season 3), a Mexican businessman and the elder brother of the President Elect. Credited only as "The Brother".
- Cecilia Rosado played by Mariana Treviño (season 2), the President Elect’s campaign manager and a member of the PRI.
- Rogelio played by Markin López (season 3), a Juarez police officer and Victor’s partner.
- Ruth Arellano Félix played by Adriana Llabrés (season 3; guest season 2), Benjamín’s wife and mother to his children.
- Alfredo Hodoyan played by Iván Aragón (season 3), Alex’s older brother and a member of the Narcojuniors.
- Marcos Santos played by Francisco Rubio (season 3), Andrea’s coworker at La Voz de Tijuana.
- Claudio Vazquez played by Claudio Lafarga (season 3), Enedina’s husband.
- Isabella played by Ana Cecilia Azuela (season 3), Andrea’s coworker.
- Isaac played by Nicolás de Llaca (season 3), Andrea’s coworker.
- Arturo Beltran Leyva played by Diego Calva (season 3), a high-ranking member of the Sinaloa cartel and Chapo’s right-hand man.
- Vicente Carrillo Fuentes played by Fernando Bonilla (season 3), Amado’s older brother and a high-ranking member of the Juarez cartel.
- Gerardo Corral played by Eugenio Rubio (season 3), a Mexican accountant working for the Juarez cartel.

== Notable guests ==
=== Introduced in Narcos ===
- A.J. Buckley as Kevin Brady (season 1), a DEA agent and Steve Murphy’s partner.
- Luis Gnecco as Cucaracha or "Cockroach" (né Mateo Moreno) (season 1), the Chilean chemist who first introduced Escobar to cocaine trafficking.
- Jon-Michael Ecker as El León (seasons 1-2), a drug trafficker based in Miami who works for the Medellín cartel.
- Adria Arjona as Helena Sotomayor (season 1), a top-class prostitute from Bogotá who acts as a spy for the DEA and the Search Bloc.
- Rafael Cebrián as Alejandro Ayala (season 1), co-leader of M-19 and Elisa’s boyfriend.
- Adan Canto as Rodrigo Lara Bonilla (season 1), a Colombian lawyer and politician.
- Dylan Bruno as Barry Seal (season 1), an American drug smuggler working for the Medellín cartel who uses the alias "McPickle".
- Alfredo Castro as Abel Escobar (season 2), Pablo’s father.
- Matthew Glave as Mike Spencer (season 2), a high-ranking member of the DEA Operations division.
- Edward James Olmos as Chucho Peña (season 3), Javier’s father.
- Shea Whigham as Agent Duffy (season 3), a DEA agent tracking the Cali cartel.
- Nicholas Gonzalez as Agent Lopez (season 3), a DEA agent and Duffy’s partner.
- Gabriel Iglesias as a Dominican gangster (season 3), who fights with Chepe in New York.
- Glenn Morshower as Senator Martin (season 3), a United States Senator.
