= Narcos season 1 =

Season of television series

Narcos
- Season 1
- Blu-ray cover
- Starring: Wagner Moura; Boyd Holbrook; Pedro Pascal; Joanna Christie; Maurice Compte; André Mattos; Roberto Urbina; Diego Cataño; Jorge A. Jimenez; Paulina Gaitán; Paulina García; Stephanie Sigman; Bruno Bichir; Raúl Méndez; Manolo Cardona
- No. of episodes: 10

Release
- Original network: Netflix
- Original release: August 28, 2015

Season chronology
- Next → Season 2

The first season of Narcos, an American crime thriller drama web television series produced and created by Chris Brancato, Carlo Bernard, and Doug Miro, follows the story of notorious drug kingpin Pablo Escobar, who became a billionaire through the production and distribution of cocaine, while also focusing on Escobar's interactions with other drug lords, DEA agents, and various opposition entities.

It stars Wagner Moura as Pablo Escobar – a Colombian drug lord and the leader of the Medellín Cartel, with Boyd Holbrook, Pedro Pascal, Joanna Christie, Maurice Compte, André Mattos, Roberto Urbina, Diego Cataño, Jorge A. Jimenez, Paulina Gaitán, Paulina García, Stephanie Sigman, Bruno Bichir, Raúl Méndez and Manolo Cardona playing various real life based characters. The season was estimated to cost about $25 million, with $2.5 million per episode.

All 10 episodes of the season became available for streaming on Netflix on August 28, 2015, and were met with generally favorable critical reception. Wagner Moura's portrayal of Pablo Escobar earned him widespread critical acclaim including a Best Actor – Television Series Drama nomination at the 73rd Golden Globe Awards, while the season itself was nominated for Best Television Series – Drama at the ceremony and received Writers Guild of America Award for Television: Episodic Drama, British Academy Television Award for Best International Programme and three Primetime Emmy Award nominations. The series was renewed for a second season, which premiered on September 2, 2016, with 10 episodes.

== Cast and characters ==
=== Main ===
- Wagner Moura as Pablo Escobar – a Colombian drug lord and the leader of the Medellín Cartel
- Boyd Holbrook as Steve Murphy – a DEA agent tasked with bringing down Escobar
- Pedro Pascal as Javier Peña – a DEA agent, who is on Murphy's task force
- Joanna Christie as Connie Murphy – Steve's wife, a nurse who works in the local hospital
- Maurice Compte as Horacio Carrillo – a Colombian police chief, based on Colonel Hugo Martínez
- André Mattos as Jorge Ochoa – founding member and former leader of the Medellín Cartel
- Roberto Urbina as Fabio Ochoa – a high-ranking member of the Medellín Cartel
- Diego Cataño as Juan Diego "La Quica" Díaz – an assassin routinely hired by the Medellín, based on Dandeny Muñoz Mosquera
- Jorge A. Jiménez as Roberto "Poison" Ramos – a hitman hired by the Medellín Cartel, who often argues with Quica about personal death counts
- Paulina Gaitán as Tata Escobar – Escobar's wife, based on María Henao
- Paulina García as Hermilda Gaviria – Escobar's mother, a former Colombian schoolteacher
- Stephanie Sigman as Valeria Vélez – a Colombian journalist who also serves as Pablo Escobar's mistress, based on Virginia Vallejo
- Bruno Bichir as Fernando Duque – a Colombian lawyer who represents Pablo Escobar, acting as his liaison with the Colombian government, based on Guido Parra.
- Raúl Méndez as César Gaviria – a Colombian economist and politician and the 28th President of Colombia
- Manolo Cardona as Eduardo Sandoval – the Vice Minister of Justice in President Gaviria's administration

=== Recurring ===
- Luis Guzmán as Gonzalo Rodríguez Gacha – founding member and former leader of the Medellín Cartel
- Juan Pablo Raba as Gustavo Gaviria – Escobar's cousin and one of the founding members of the Medellín Cartel
- Richard T. Jones as CIA Officer – a CIA officer, also on Murphy's task force
- Ana de la Reguera as Elisa Álvarez – the co-leader of guerrilla faction 19th of April Movement (M-19)
- Patrick St. Esprit as Colonel Lou Wysession – a Marine officer fighting against communism
- Danielle Kennedy as Ambassador Noonan – a United States Ambassador deployed to Colombia under Ronald Reagan
- Alberto Ammann as Hélmer "Pacho" Herrera – a Colombian drug lord and high-ranking member of the Cali Cartel
- Gabriela de la Garza as Diana Turbay – a Colombian journalist who was kidnapped by the Medellín cartel
- Luis Gnecco as "La Cucaracha" or Mateo 'Cockroach' Moreno – a Chilean drug chemist who flees Chile and join forces with Pablo Escobar before being executed by Escobar for selling information due to personal dispute.
- Julián Díaz as El Negro or "Blackie" (né Nelson Hernández) – a member of the Medellín Cartel, who is frequently seen by Escobar's side (in real life, Escobar had a close friend named Jorge "El Negro" Pabón)
- Juan Sebastián Calero as Navegante – a violent associate of the Cali Cartel who works as their top henchman
- Jon-Michael Ecker as El León or "The Lion" – a childhood friend of Escobar's who becomes his first drug smuggler into Miami and subsequently runs Escobar's Miami operations
- Cristina Umaña as Judy Moncada – a former leader in the Medellín Cartel who, after Escobar murdered her husband Kiko, led a breakaway cartel and allied with the Cali Cartel and Los Pepes; she is based on the real-life Dolly Moncada
- Christian Tappan as Gerardo 'Kiko' Moncada, Escobar's business partner
- Orlando Valenzuela as Fernando Galeano, Escobar's business partner
- Juan Riedinger as Carlos Lehder – Lion's contact in the United States, tasked with distributing the cocaine
- Thaddeus Phillips as Agent Owen – a CIA agent on the Colombia task force
- Ariel Sierra as Sureshot – one of Escobar's sicarios
- Carolina Gaitán as Marta Ochoa – the Ochoas' sister, who is kidnapped by M-19
- Laura Perico as Marina Ochoa – the Ochoas' sister, who has an affair with Escobar's cousin Gustavo
- Vera Mercado as Ana Gaviria – the wife of César Gaviria and the First Lady of Colombia
- Juan Murcia as Juan Pablo Escobar, Escobar's young son
- Alejandro Buitrago as Velasco
- Jorge Monterosa as Trujillo
- Andres Felipe as General Jaramillo
- Luis Miguel Hurtado as El Paisa, an Escobar employee and truck driver
- Juan Pablo Espinosa as Luis Carlos Galán – a Colombian politician whom Gaviria works as a personal secretary, who runs for Presidency before getting assassinated.

== Episodes ==
No. overall	No. in season	Title	Directed by	Written by	Original release date
1	1	"Descenso"	José Padilha	Chris Brancato and Carlo Bernard & Doug Miro	August 28, 2015
Steve Murphy narrates: In Colombia, 1989, the Centra Spike, a US Army Special Ops unit tasked with gathering intelligence, observes a call by Pablo Escobar's sicario, Poison, about a party at La Dispensaria. A Search Bloc team, led by Colonel Carillo, executes everyone in the bar. During the 1973 Chilean coup d'état, several drug makers are lined up and shot; Chilean drug chemist Cockroach survives and brings his product to Colombian smuggler Pablo Escobar, who later executes him. Pablo and his cousin, Gustavo, start transporting cocaine to Miami using their friend the Lion and Carlos Lehder. Their business is booming and they form partners with Gacha and Ochoa brothers. DEA agent Steve Murphy joins the war on drugs in Bogota.
2	2	"The Sword of Simón Bolívar"	José Padilha	Chris Brancato	August 28, 2015
With time Pablo's business brings him in so much money that he buries the cash in his fields and employs an accountant, Blackbeard to track the buried cash. Steve Murphy and his wife Connie Murphy have trouble at airport security, who scans their passports to be faxed to Pablo's sicarios. Pablo makes moves to enter into politics and finds support from an upcoming journalist Valeria Velez, with whom he begins an affair. The Communist radical group M-19 kidnaps Marta Ochoa, which enrages the whole Medellín Cartel. Pablo calls a meeting to discuss about safety and operation of the cartel at Las Margaritas. Javier Peña, Steve Murphy's DEA partner, gathers intel about this meeting from his informant and sends her to gather more intel. She falls into trouble causing Javier and Carillo to come to her escape. Steve finds their cat murdered and hung in his apartment.
3	3	"The Men of Always"	Guillermo Navarro	Dana Calvo	August 28, 2015
To enter politics, Pablo with help of Valeria meets with lawyer of New Liberals party, Fernando Duque. They put forward a plan to bribe the Minister of Justice Rodrigo Lara Bonilla, to buy support for Pablo's campaign, who reluctantly agrees. Pablo's wife, Tata, dislikes Valeria. She later goes into labor and gives birth to a girl child. Pablo's campaigns win him the election by a good margin. Javier and Steve come up with plans to prove Pablo's drug trafficking background and find the mugshots taken earlier. Minister of Justice, Rodrigo publicly testifies in Congress about the bribe and asks Pablo to leave the congress. An enraged Pablo resigns from the position and orders the execution of Rodrigo.
4	4	"The Palace in Flames"	Guillermo Navarro	Chris Brancato	August 28, 2015
Despite a new extradition treaty and the anti-narco policy by presidential candidate Luis Carlos Galán, the U.S. puts more money into fighting communism. Javier and Steve bribe General Jaramillo to bring in Carrillo as head of Search Bloc. Search Bloc receives intel about Pablo's hideout fincas, while raiding Steve finds an address that lead them to Blackbeard and evidence to Pablo's drug trafficking. Some evidence among these prove a link between Communist-ruled Nicaragua and Pablo, leading the DEA receiving more resources. They catch Carlos Lehder and extradite him. Pablo teams up with M-19 guerrilla, Ivan offering him US$2 million to raid and destroy evidence against him at Palace of Justice. Elisa talks to Connie about Ivan's plans. She is hidden at Javier's. The infamous Palace of Justice Siege leaves many victims and no evidence against Pablo. Pablo later kills Ivan.
5	5	"There Will Be a Future"	Andi Baiz	Dana Ledoux Miller	August 28, 2015
Pablo's extreme methods put the narcos on the brink of war with Carillo and the government. Peña tries to protect his witness.
6	6	"Explosivos"	Andi Baiz	Andy Black	August 28, 2015
Peña and Carillo close in on Gacha. Murphy tries to protect pro-extradition candidate Gaviria from a notorious assassin connected to Pablo. Carillo manages to find Gacha with the help of an informant who is later killed by "Poison" as Pena leads an attack on Gacha's hideout resulting in both sides suffering heavy casualties (including Gacha's own son) before Gacha himself is killed. Pablo manipulates a young man to be a suicide bomber under the guise of recording Gaviria. At an airport Gaviria plans to board a plane for his next campaign speech but Murphy convinces him to postpone it unknowingly saving his life as the bomber then boards Avianca Flight 203 and activates the bomb.
7	7	"You Will Cry Tears of Blood"	Fernando Coimbra	Dana Calvo & Zach Calig	August 28, 2015
Pablo goes into hiding as the political tide turns against him, but he finds a way to strike back. Murphy and Peña finally get the CIA to help them.
8	8	"La Gran Mentira"	Fernando Coimbra	Allison Abner	August 28, 2015
A tragic mistake forces the government to change tactics in the fight against Pablo. But Pablo faces bigger threats from inside his empire.
9	9	"La Catedral"	Andi Baiz	Nick Schenk & Chris Brancato	August 28, 2015
The hunt for Pablo seems to be over after he makes a deal with the government, but Murphy and Peña - and the Cali Cartel - have other plans.
10	10	"Despegue"	Andi Baiz	Nick Schenk & Chris Brancato	August 28, 2015
Pablo's activities in prison provoke the government into taking extreme action. Murphy and Peña face a situation of their own.

== Reception ==
=== Critical response ===
The first season received generally favorable reviews from critics. Rotten Tomatoes a review aggregator surveyed 45 reviews and judged 78% to be positive. The site reads, "Narcos lacks sympathetic characters, but pulls in the viewer with solid acting and a story that's fast-paced enough to distract from its familiar outline." On Metacritic, Season 1 holds a score of 77 out of 100, based on 19 critics, indicating "generally favorable" reviews. IGN gave the first season a 7.8 out of 10 score calling it "Good" and reads "It's a true-to-life account, sometimes to a fault, of the rise of Pablo Escobar and the hunt that brought him down laced with stellar performances and tension-filled stand-offs. Its blend of archival footage reminds us that the horrors depicted really happened, but also manage to present an Escobar that is indefensible but frighteningly sympathetic."

The season received generally positive reviews from many media outlets. Writing for The Philadelphia Inquirer, Tirdad Derakhshani reviewed the season positively, calling it "Intense, enlightening, brilliant, unnerving, and addictive, Narcos is high-concept drama at its finest." The New York Post's, Robert Rorke said, "Catching Escobar then becomes an exciting and suspenseful story arc, and makes Narcos the first cool show of the new season." Joshua Alston of The A.V. Club judged "Narcos is frequently funny and just stylized enough to amplify the entertainment value without minimizing the gravity of the subject matter. It’s an eminently bingeable show even as it makes a strong case for moderate consumption." Television critic, Tim Goodman of The Hollywood Reporter also reviewed the series positively saying, "The series begins to find its pacing not long after, and we see the strength of Moura’s acting, which to his credit never races, in the early going, toward over-the-top menace or the drug-lord cliches we're all used to at this point. Credit also the fact that Padilha brings a documentary feel to Narcos."

Nancy deWolf Smith of The Wall Street Journal wrote, "The omniscient-narrator device works very well for a complex story spanning many years and varied sets of players." Critic Neil Genzlinger of The New York Times said, "It’s built on sharp writing and equally sharp acting, as any good series needs to be." The San Francisco Chronicle's David Wiegand wrote, "Virtually every performance is equal to the quality of the script, but Moura is especially compelling as he manipulates the seeming incongruities of Escobar’s character to heighten his aura of unpredictable menace.... Brancato does make one significant misstep by having the entire series heavily narrated by Murphy." Chief TV critic Brian Lowry of Variety also lauded the series saying, "The sparely told project weaves together a taut, gripping narrative, in stark contrast with the flatness of its characters and color scheme. All told, this Gaumont production is the kind of binge-worthy TV addiction that Netflix was born to import."

Some were more critical towards the show including chief television critic Mary McNamara of Los Angeles Times who wrote, "It's a grand if inconsistent experiment that, from the moment it opens with a definition of magic realism, wears its considerable ambitions on its sleeve." New York Daily News's David Hinckley, moderately reviewed the season and said, "One of the strengths of Narcos is its refusal to paint anyone as purely good or bad." Writing for IndieWire, Liz Shannon Miller said, "An unlikeable character, no matter the circumstances, remains unlikeable, but an unlikeable character trumps a bland blonde man whose position of authority appears to be his only really interesting character trait, no matter how much voice-over he utters." Josh Bell of Las Vegas Weekly quipped, "Mostly the show is a breezy tour through history, sometimes informative but rarely affecting."

=== Accolades ===
Year	Award	Category	Recipient(s)	Result	Ref.
2016	Writers Guild of America Awards	Episodic Drama	"Explosivos"	Nominated	
2016	Golden Globe Awards	Best Actor – Television Series Drama	Wagner Moura	Nominated	
2016	Golden Globe Awards	Best Television Series – Drama		Nominated	
2016	BAFTA TV Awards	Best International Programme		Nominated	
2016	Satellite Awards	Best Television Series – Drama		Nominated	
2016	Primetime Creative Arts Emmy Awards	Outstanding Main Title Design		Nominated	
2016	Primetime Creative Arts Emmy Awards	Outstanding Main Title Theme Music	Rodrigo Amarante	Nominated	
2016	Primetime Creative Arts Emmy Awards	Outstanding Single-Camera Picture Editing for a Drama Series	"Descenso"	Nominated	
