= Narcos season 2 =

Season of television series

Narcos
- Season 2
- Blu-ray cover
- Starring: Wagner Moura; Boyd Holbrook; Pedro Pascal; Paulina Gaitán; Cristina Umaña; Joanna Christie; Paulina García; Fernando Rodriguez; Raúl Méndez; Manolo Cardona; Bruno Bichir; Eric Lange; Florencia Lozano; Damián Alcázar; Alberto Ammann; Francisco Denis
- No. of episodes: 10

Release
- Original network: Netflix
- Original release: September 2, 2016

Season chronology
- ← Previous; Season 1 Next → Season 3

The second season of Narcos, an American crime thriller drama web television series produced and created by Chris Brancato, Carlo Bernard, and Doug Miro, follows the story of notorious drug kingpin Pablo Escobar, who became a billionaire through the production and distribution of cocaine, while also focusing on Escobar's interactions with drug lords, DEA agents, and various opposition entities.

It stars Wagner Moura as Pablo Escobar – a Colombian drug lord and the leader of the Medellín Cartel, with Boyd Holbrook, Pedro Pascal, Paulina Gaitán, Cristina Umaña, Joanna Christie, Paulina García, Raúl Méndez, Manolo Cardona, Bruno Bichir, Eric Lange, Florencia Lozano, Damián Alcázar, Alberto Ammann, and Francisco Denis playing various real life based characters.

All 10 episodes of the season became available for streaming on Netflix on September 2, 2016, and were met with more favorable critical reviews than the first season, with critics particularly praising the performance of Wagner Moura as Pablo Escobar. On September 6, 2016, Netflix renewed the series for a third and fourth season.

== Cast and characters ==
=== Main ===
- Wagner Moura as Pablo Escobar – a Colombian drug lord and the leader of the Medellín Cartel
- Boyd Holbrook as Steve Murphy – a DEA agent tasked with bringing down Escobar
- Pedro Pascal as Javier Peña – a DEA agent, who is on Murphy's task force
- Paulina Gaitán as Tata Escobar – Escobar's wife, based on María Henao
- Cristina Umaña as Judy Moncada – a former leader in the Medellín Cartel who, after Escobar murdered her husband Kiko, led a breakaway cartel and allied with the Cali Cartel and Los Pepes; she is based on the real-life Dolly Moncada
- Joanna Christie as Connie Murphy – Steve's wife, a nurse who works in the local hospital
- Paulina García as Hermilda Gaviria – Escobar's mother, a former Colombian schoolteacher
- Raúl Méndez as César Gaviria – a Colombian economist and politician and the 28th President of Colombia
- Manolo Cardona as Eduardo Sandoval – the Vice Minister of Justice in President Gaviria's administration
- Bruno Bichir as Fernando Duque – a Colombian lawyer who represents Pablo Escobar, acting as his liaison with the Colombian government
- Eric Lange as Bill Stechner – the CIA Station Chief in Colombia
- Florencia Lozano as Claudia Messina - DEA agent and Murphy and Peña's supervisor
- Damián Alcázar as Gilberto Rodríguez Orejuela – the Leader of the Cali Cartel and one of Pablo Escobar's primary rivals
- Alberto Ammann as Hélmer "Pacho" Herrera – a Colombian drug lord and high-ranking member of the Cali Cartel
- Francisco Denis as Miguel Rodríguez Orejuela – a high-ranking member of the Cali cartel and Gilberto's younger brother

=== Recurring ===
- Diego Cataño as Juan Diego "La Quica" Díaz – an assassin routinely hired by the Medellín, based on Dandeny Muñoz Mosquera
- Leynar Gómez as Limón – a pimp and taxi driver from Medellín who becomes one of Escobar's sicarios, based on Alvaro de Jesús Agudelo (a.k.a. "El Limón")
- Martina García as Maritza – an old friend of Limon's roped into unwittingly helping Escobar
- Brett Cullen as Ambassador Arthur Crosby – A former Navy officer sent as US Ambassador to Colombia by George H. W. Bush in 1992, replacing Noonan
- Konstantin Melikhov as Edward Jacoby - A U.S. intelligence officer attached to Centra Spike
- Stephanie Sigman as Valeria Vélez – a Colombian journalist who also serves as Pablo Escobar's mistress, based on Virginia Vallejo
- Maurice Compte as Horacio Carrillo – a Colombian police chief, based on Colonel Hugo Martínez
- Julián Díaz as El Negro or "Blackie" (né Nelson Hernández) – a member of the Medellín Cartel, who is frequently seen by Escobar's side
- Juan Sebastián Calero as Navegante – a violent associate of the Cali Cartel who works as their top henchman
- Jon-Michael Ecker as El León or "The Lion" – a childhood friend of Escobar's who becomes his first drug smuggler into Miami and subsequently runs Escobar's Miami operations
- Germán Jaramillo as Gustavo de Greiff, Colombia's Attorney General and vehement critic of President Gaviria's drug policy
- Juan Pablo Shuk as Colonel Hugo Martínez – Carrillo's successor as the commander of Search Bloc
- Alfredo Castro as Abel Escobar, Pablo's father
- Carolina Acevedo as Gabriela, a prostitute who introduces Maritza to Agent Peña

== Episodes ==
| No. overall | No. in season | Title | Directed by | Written by | Original release date |
|---|---|---|---|---|---|
| 11 | 1 | "Free at Last" | Gerardo Naranjo | Adam Fierro | September 2, 2016 |
In the aftermath of a massive military effort to take Pablo into custody, the family reunites while enemies worry. Steve and Connie fight about safety.
| 12 | 2 | "Cambalache" | Gerardo Naranjo | Zachary Reiter | September 2, 2016 |
Tata gets impatient with life on the run. Pablo responds to President Gaviria's reward offer. Steve and Javier meet their new boss.
| 13 | 3 | "Our Man in Madrid" | Andrés Baiz | Zachary Reiter and Steve Lightfoot | September 2, 2016 |
President Gaviria has a new job for an old colleague Carrillo. The Search Bloc's new tactics shake up Pablo, but also unsettle Steve and Javier.
| 14 | 4 | "The Good, the Bad, and the Dead" | Andrés Baiz | Teleplay by : Zachary Reiter and Carlo Bernard & Doug Miro; Story by : T.J. Brady & Rasheed Newson and Steve Lightfoot | September 2, 2016 |
The Cali cartel discusses moving in on Pablo's territory. Limón proposes a plan to Maritza. Tata gets a gun for protection.
| 15 | 5 | "The Enemies of My Enemy" | Josef Wladyka | Teleplay by : T.J. Brady & Rasheed Newson and Carlo Bernard & Doug Miro; Story by : T.J. Brady & Rasheed Newson | September 2, 2016 |
The Search Bloc gets a new leader following the death of Carrillo. Javier loses faith in the system. Pablo brings Tata's brother Carlos down from Miami to cheer her up.
| 16 | 6 | "Los Pepes" | Josef Wladyka | Julie Siege | September 2, 2016 |
The newly-formed Los Pepes want to destroy Pablo and his empire. Tata's brother urges her to leave and seek safety with her children.
| 17 | 7 | "Deutschland 93" | Josef Wladyka | Carlo Bernand and Doug Miro | September 2, 2016 |
As the danger intensifies for the Escobars, Pablo sends his family to another country. Gaviria weighs the opportunity to use them as leverage.
| 18 | 8 | "Exit El Patrón" | Gerardo Naranjo | Teleplay by : Gideon Yago & Curtis Gwinn; Story by : Gideon Yago | September 2, 2016 |
Colombia begins to turn on Escobar after his latest terrorist attack. Tata receives help from an unlikely ally. Quica gets increasingly anxious.
| 19 | 9 | "Nuestra Finca" | Andrés Baiz | Julie Siege & Clayton Trussell | September 2, 2016 |
Pablo is reunited with an estranged family member. Judy Moncada's life is put in danger. The DEA and CIA clash over how to handle Los Pepes.
| 20 | 10 | "Al Fin Cayó!" | Andrés Baiz | Carlo Bernard & Doug Miro | September 2, 2016 |
Javier deals with the repercussions from Judy's interview. Tata tries to convince Pablo to surrender for the sake of his children.

== Reception ==
The second season of Narcos received more favorable reviews than the first with critics particularly praising the performance of Wagner Moura as Pablo Escobar. Rotten Tomatoes gives it a score of 92% positive, based on 16 critic revies: "Narcos' sophomore season manages to elevate the stakes to a gut-wrenching degree in what continues to be a magnificent account of Pablo Escobar's life." On Metacritic, Season 2 holds a score of 76 out of 100, based on 13 critics, indicating "generally favorable" reviews. IGN gave the second season a score of 7.4 out of 10 saying it "Good" and reads "It may go overboard with its love of Pablo Escobar, but I can't truly fault the show for taking advantage of its best performer and character – or for scrambling to find an emotional core on a show that can feel rather clinical."

Season two received generally positive reviews from many media outlets. Joshua Alston of The A.V. Club lauded the performance of Moura's and said, "While the show never soft-pedals the havoc Escobar created, it makes him surprisingly sympathetic, thanks in part to Moura’s shrewd, affecting performance." Mark A. Perigard of Boston Herald said, "Moura’s performance anchors this show." Critic Neil Genzlinger of New York Times said, "Mr. Moura is inscrutably brilliant at the center of it all." Writing for IndieWire, Liz Shannon Miller said, "The show has figured out how to balance its ostensible heroes. The buddy cop energy between Peña and Murphy was one of Season 2’s most enjoyable side dishes--enough to make one hope for more." The New York Post's, Robert Rorke said, "Without [Escobar] there’s a gaping hole. So allow yourself to be mesmerized and appalled at one of the most outrageous true crime dramas ever filmed." Emily VanDerWerff of Vox said, "The second season of Narcos, Netflix’s historical drama about drug lord Pablo Escobar and the law enforcement officers who worked to bring him down, is a marked improvement over the first."

Entertainment Weekly's Jeff Jensen also reviewed the series positively saying, "Where season 1 spanned 10 years, season 2 captures Escobar's last days on the loose. Each tightly packed episode moves quickly without sacrificing richness, chronicling the uneasy alliances and gross tactics employed to snare Escobar." Television critic, Tim Goodman of The Hollywood Reporter said, "What works in the early going of season two is that the fall is almost always more thrilling, if not engaging, than the buildup. Escobar senses the loss of power and Moura does some of his best work as viewers read the worry and interior thinking on his face." John Anderson of Wall Street Journal wrote, "The sense of desperation among all the characters is heightened; the stakes are higher; the politics more sordid. Other aspects of the series, however, have remained disappointingly the same." However, Writing for Collider Chris Cabin expressed that, "There are potent and provocative ideas that lie frustratingly dormant throughout this series, which seems to be just happy to play a competent but only occasionally compelling Michael Mann riff.
