= Guillermo González Calderoni =

Commander of the Mexican Federal Judicial Police

- Born: March 26, 1948; Reynosa, Mexico
- Died: February 5, 2003 (aged 54); McAllen, Texas
- Occupation: Police officer

Guillermo González Calderoni (26 March 1948 – 5 February 2003) was a commander of the Mexican Federal Judicial Police, and one of the strongmen of the Attorney General of Mexico, who went on to accuse Raul Salinas de Gortari, the brother of former president Carlos Salinas de Gortari, of being involved in drug trafficking.

== Biography ==
Calderoni was born in Reynosa, Tamaulipas, Mexico, in a well-off family. His father held an important post at Pemex, the state-owned petroleum company. His mother was Italian-American. Besides his native Spanish, he was fluent in English and French. In contrast to Spanish naming customs, he is often referred to by his mother's last name, rather than his father's more common last name.

In the early 1980s, he enrolled as a federal officer on the United States-Mexico border and rose quickly to the rank of commander. Calderoni expressed contempt for Americans and Drug Enforcement Administration agents, and admitted to smuggling cocaine across the border into El Paso, Texas.

He was murdered by an unknown shooter on 5 February 2003, in McAllen, Texas.

== In popular culture ==
In the 2018 Netflix drama, Narcos: Mexico, Calderoni is played by actor Julio Cesar Cedillo.

== Sources ==
Articles

- Bowden, C. (September 10, 2014). "Lord of the Drug Ring". GQ (published November 2003). ISSN 0016-6979.

Books

- Bowden, C. (2002). Down by the River: Drugs, Money, Murder, and Family. New York: Simon & Schuster. ISBN 9780684853437.
- Poppa, T. (1998). Drug Lord: The Life and Death of a Mexican Kingpin. Seattle: Demand Publications. ISBN 9780966443004.
