= Rasheed Newson =

Television drama writer

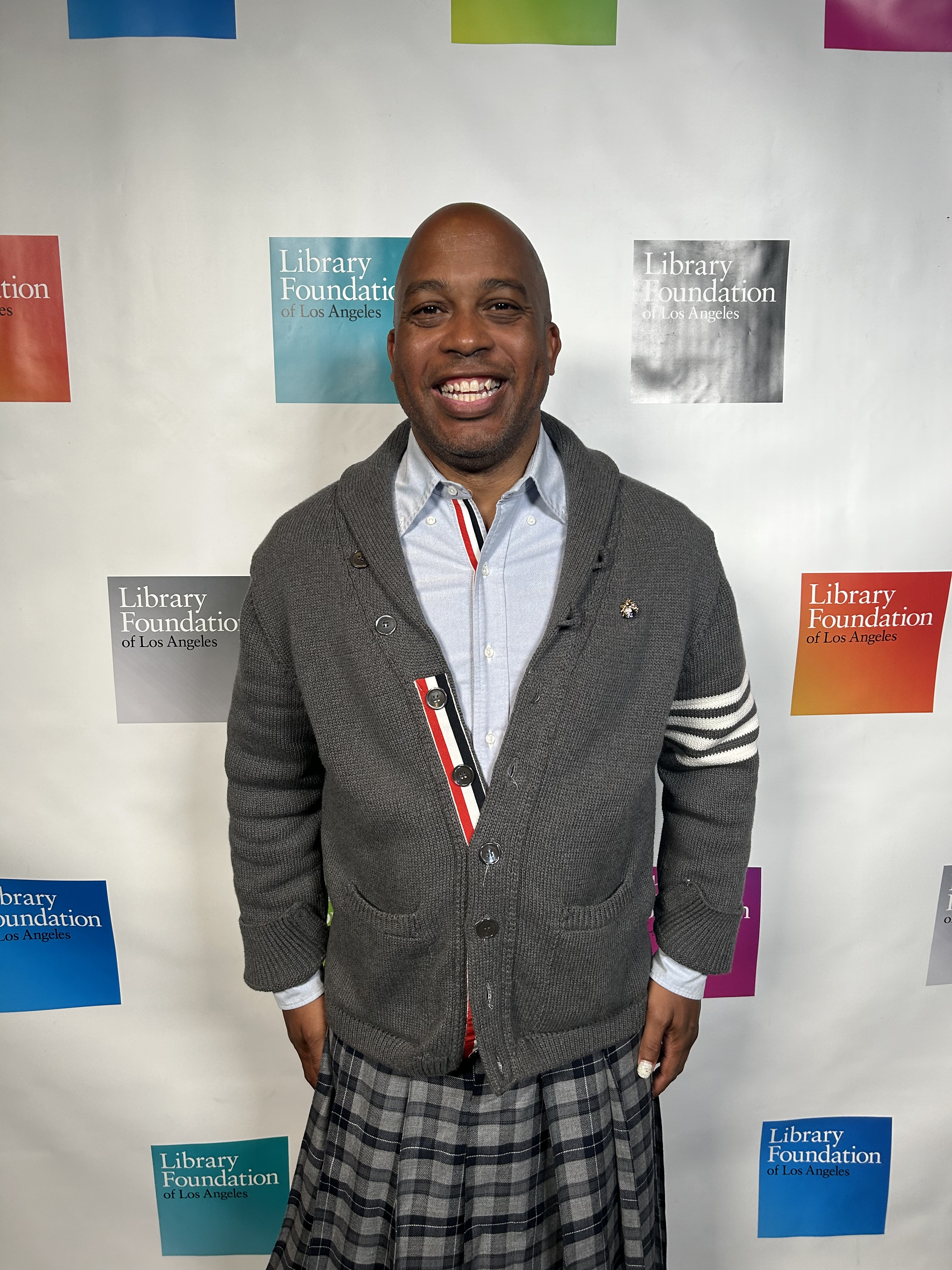
- Born: May 27, 1979 (age 47)
- Citizenship: American
- Education: Georgetown University
- Occupations: Author television drama writer producer novelist
- Known for: Authoring My Government Means to Kill Me
- Notable work: Bel-Air; The Chi; Narcos
- Website: rasheednewson.com

Rasheed Newson (born May 27, 1979) is an American television drama writer, producer, and novelist. He co-developed and is an executive producer of the drama series Bel-Air. His debut novel, "My Government Means to Kill Me," was a 2023 Lambda Literary finalist for Gay Fiction and was named one of "The 100 Notable Books of 2022" by The New York Times.

== Education ==
Rasheed grew up in Indianapolis, Indiana. He attended Georgetown University and graduated in 2001. At Georgetown University, Rasheed was a movie reviewer for the student newspaper, The Hoya.

== Personal life ==
Rasheed identifies himself as gay. He and his husband live in Pasadena with their two children.

== Career ==
In 2008, Rasheed and T.J. Brady were hired as a television writing team to serve as staff writers on the drama series Lie to Me.

In 2020, Rasheed and Brady wrote pilot script to reboot the movie Finding Forrester into a television drama series for NBC.

In 2021, Rasheed co-developed Bel-Air along with Morgan Cooper and Malcolm Spellman. Bel-Air, a retooling of the comedy series The Fresh Prince of Bel-Air, premiered on Peacock on February 13, 2022. Rasheed and T.J. were executive producers and the showrunners for Season 1 of Bel-Air.

Rasheed worked as co-writer and co-producer on Army Wives; as co-writer and co-producer on The 100; as co-writer and co-supervising producers on Narcos; as co-writer and co-supervising producer on Animal Kingdom; as co-writer and co-executive producers Shooter; as co-writer and consulting producer on The Fix; and as co-writer and co-executive producers on Bel-Air.

Rasheed's debut novel, "My Government Means to Kill Me," was published on August 23, 2022, by Flatiron Books. Set in New York during the height of the AIDS crisis in the 1980s, the book centered on a Black, gay protagonist. The novel garnered reviews from the Washington Post and New York Times. The Philadelphia Inquirer named "My Government Means to Kill Me" one of the best books of 2022. The novel was also a finalist for the 2023 Lambda Literary Award for Gay Fiction.

His second novel, "There's Only One Sin in Hollywood," was released on June 2, 2026, by Flatiron Books. The novel follows a Hollywood backlot fixer determined to expose those responsible for the death of a closeted Black actor in the late 1950s.
