= Manolo Cardona =

Colombian film and television actor

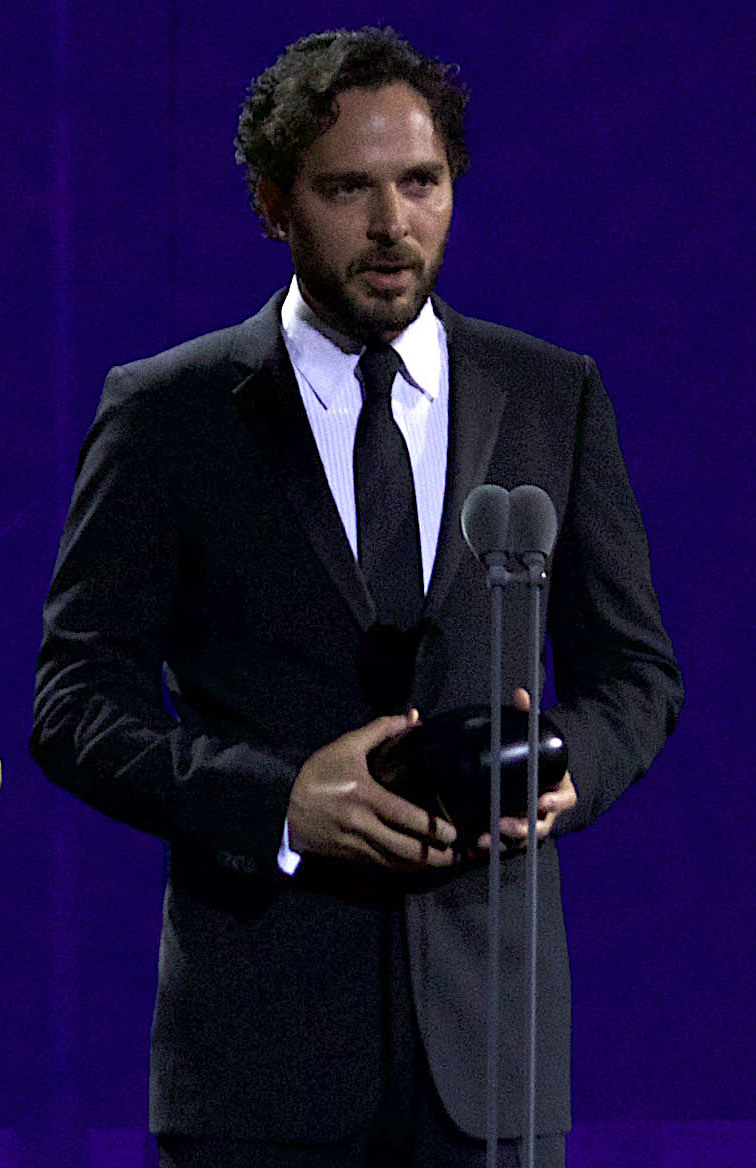
- Cardona in 2018
- Born: Manuel Julián Cardona Molano; 25 April 1977 (age 49); Popayán, Cauca, Colombia
- Occupation: Actor

Manuel "Manolo" Julián Cardona Molano (born April 25, 1977) is a Colombian actor.

== Personal life ==
Cardona was born in Popayán, Cauca, Colombia on April 25, 1977. At the age of seven, Cardona's family nicknamed him "Manolo," which later became his stage name. He moved to Cali, Colombia when he was eighteen to study finance and international relations, but later moved to Spain to study film. Manolo's mother, Nancy Molano, is a psychologist, merchant, and astrologer. His father, Enrique Javier Cardona, was a politician and was the mayor of Popayán. Cardona has three brothers and one sister.

After completing his studies in finance and international relations in Cali, Colombia, Cardona decided to further his artistic education abroad. He relocated to Spain to pursue a degree in film.

In addition to his successful acting career, Cardona is also recognized for his philanthropic efforts and advocacy work. He has been involved in several charitable initiatives, particularly those focused on supporting children's education and well-being.

== Career ==
Cardona began modeling at an early age after his elder brother introduced him to the modeling agency where he signed his first contract. At the age of fourteen he shot his first television commercial and began modeling professionally for TV commercials, photography, and runways for several agencies in Colombia. In 1995, at the age of 18, he began his acting career on a popular Colombian Television series called Padres e hijos in which he starred for three years. In 1998 he won his first lead role in the television telenovela Carolina Barrantes. A year later he starred in the telenovela ¿Por qué diablos?, portraying a young man who becomes part of a drug organization so he can avenge his friend's death. In 2001 he appeared in Amor a mil, another Colombian telenovela. In 2002 he signed an exclusive contract with Telemundo and Argos Comunicación, and a year later in 2003 he starred in his first Mexican telenovela, Ladrón de Corazones, where he portrayed Gustavo Velazco, a man who returns to his home town in Mexico after ten years to avenge his father's death and clear his name. He was the host of Telemundo's Spanish version of Temptation Island. He also played Sebastián on the Mexican telenovela Gitanas. Cardona made his film debut in 2005 with the film Rosario Tijeras, based on Jorge Franco's book of the same name. The film was nominated for a Goya Award for best foreign film. In 2005 the film had its North American premiere at the American Film Institute Festival, in Hollywood.

In 2005 he starred in the film La mujer de mi hermano opposite Bárbara Mori and Christian Meier which was released in the United States in 2006. In 2006 he finished filming Madrid-Mexico with director Enrique Renteria.

After a two-year absence, Cardona returned to work for Telemundo and Argos on the Telemundo production Marina, replacing Mauricio Ochmann as Ricardo. The telenovela was filmed in Acapulco, Mexico.

On September 27, 2007, Cardona was awarded the "Latin Pride Award" in the Back Bay Events Center in Boston. The award honors the accomplishments of Hispanics of different areas and is a production of the Latin Pride Magazine. Cardona appeared in the 2008 Disney film Beverly Hills Chihuahua.

In 2008, Cardona appeared in El Cartel de los Sapos for Caracol TV where he played a drug dealer. The series was filmed in Miami, New York, Colombia, Panamá and Madrid. The series was followed by a film of the same name. Both of which were based on a book written by Andres Lopes alias Florecita, who wrote the book while in prison. The series debuted on Caracol TV on June 5, 2008, continuing until October 2008. Since it premiered in July 2008, El Cartel was the highest rated show on Colombian television. When it premiered on Telemundo in December 2008, it was the highest rated show in the history of the network.

In November 2008, Cardona played a lead role in the film Undertow. Cardona plays the character of Santiago, a gay painter who arrives in a small town and falls in love with Miguel, a married fisherman played by Cristian Mercado who is torn between his love for Santiago and his love for his pregnant wife Mariela (Tatiana Astengo). The film is produced by Dynamo Capital (Colombia) and Calvo Films (Peru), and is directed by Javier Fuentes-León. Undertow also premiered at the San Sebastian Film Festival on September 23, 2010. The film had a great reception at the Sundance Film Festival, winning the Audience Award for World Cinema Drama.

Cardona appeared in an episode of Tiempo final titled "La entrega" in the second season of the series which also co-starred his girlfriend Katarina Sacht. Tiempo final was a remake of the Chilean series of the same name, and aired on Fox.

He acted in La Ultima Muerte alongside Kuno Becker, in 2009. The film premiered in Mexico in November 2009.

Cardona was in the third season of Spain's version of Sin tetas no hay paraíso, which aired on Telecinco. In the series, he played a policeman named Martin La Roca. The series premiered in Spain in fall 2010.

He produced and directed a short film called Risas Inocentes with his brother Juan. The short premiered in Colombia in 2009 and was produced by his film production company 11:11 FilmHe starred in Netflix's Who Killed Sara? as the main character Alex Guzmán. More recently, his 11:11 Films company struck a deal with Viacom International Studios.

== Filmography ==
=== Film ===
Year	Title	Role
2005	Rosario Tijeras	Emilio
2005	La mujer de mi hermano	Gonzalo / Rohan-Ignacio's brother
2008	Beverly Hills Chihuahua	Sam Cortez
2009	Contracorriente	Santiago
2011	Al acecho del leopardo	Eduardo
2011	La última muerte	David Tapia
2011	The Snitch Cartel	Martín González "El Fresita"
2012	La frontera del crimen	Roberto
2012	Restos	Luis
2014	Fort Bliss	Luis
2014	Love Film Festival	Adrián
2015	Corazón de León	Édgar
2016	Macho	La Karen
2016	Pacifico	Éber
2018	El cuaderno de Sara	Sergio
2023	Death's Roulette	Pablo Vega

=== Television ===
Year	Title	Role	Notes
1995–1998	Padres e hijos	Nicolás Franco	
1998–1999	Carolina Barrantes	David Molina Suárez	Main role; 66 episodes
1999	¿Por qué diablos?	Juan "Diablo" Cantor	Main role; 124 episodes
2001	Amor a mil	Jhon Héctor Afanador	Main role; 124 episodes
2003	Ladrón de corazones	Gustavo Velasco	Main role; 141 episodes
2004	Gitanas	Sebastián Domínguez	Main role; 162 episodes
2006	Marina	Ricardo Alarcón Morales #2	Main role; 168 episodes
2008	El cartel	Martín González "El Fresita"	Main role (season 1); 48 episodes
2008	Tiempo final	Pablo	Episode: "La entrega"
2009	Sin tetas no hay paraíso	Martín La Roca	Main role (season 3); 15 episodes
2011–2012	Aquele Beijo	Juan	Recurring role; 153 episodes
2013	Covert Affairs	Teo Braga	Recurring role (season 4); 6 episodes
2013	The Arrangement	Andrés García Vargas	Television film
2013	Reign	Tomás	Episodes: "Kissed" and "Hearts and Minds"
2014	Palabra de ladrón	Hernán López Mendoza	Main role; 13 episodes
2015–2016	Narcos	Eduardo Sandoval	Recurring role (seasons 1–2); 10 episodes
2016–2017	La Hermandad	Julio Kaczinski	Main role (seasons 1–2); 25 episodes
2016–2017	2091	Ferrán	Main role; 12 episodes
2018	Rubirosa	Porfirio Rubirosa	Main role; 12 episodes
2018–2019	María Magdalena	Jesus	Main role; 60 episodes
2021–2022	¿Quién mató a Sara?	Álex Guzmán	Main role
2026	Los encantos del sinvergüenza	Francisco Valiente	Main cast

== Awards ==
- 2000: "Best Actor of Colombia" from TV y Novelas.
- 2001: "The Best Colombian Leading Actor of the Year" in Houston; a tribute paid by the Hispanic community in the United States.
- 2008: "Best Supporting Actor" from Imagen Foundation Awards for Beverly Hills Chihuahua.
