= Gaumont International Television =

Television production company

Gaumont Television
- Type: Subsidiary
- Industry: Television
- Founded: September 12, 2011; 15 years ago
- Headquarters: West Hollywood, California, United States
- Key people: Nicolas Atlan (president, Gaumont U.S.)
- Parent: Gaumont

Gaumont Television (formerly known as Gaumont International Television) is the American television division of the French film studio Gaumont. It was launched on September 12, 2011 as an independent studio based in Los Angeles, designed to produce drama and comedy television programming for the U.S. and international markets.

== Productions ==
- Hemlock Grove on Netflix
- Narcos on Netflix
- Hannibal on NBC
- F Is for Family on Netflix.
- Narcos: Mexico on Netflix.

== Developing productions ==
- Barbarella
- Viva La Madness
