= Maurice Compte =

Cuban American actor

- Born: 1972 (age 53–54); New Orleans, Louisiana, U.S.
- Occupation: Actor

Maurice Compte (/mɔːrˈiːs ˈkɒmpti/; born in 1972) is an American actor known for his roles as Gaff in Breaking Bad, Santiago "Big Evil" Flores in End of Watch, and as Colonel Carrillo in Narcos.

== Early life ==
Born in Miami, Florida and raised in New Orleans, Compte is the son of Cuban migrants.

== Career ==
Compte has been active as an actor since 1996. He first appeared in series such as Chicago Hope and Pacific Blue. This was followed by minor roles in movies like Before Night Falls and Double Whammy. Compte's first recurring role was as Charlie Gutierrez in the series E-Ring from 2005. Other guest appearances as in Monk and NCIS: Los Angeles followed. In 2011 he portrayed cartel member Gaff in the hit television series Breaking Bad. A year later, he was seen in End of Watch. Other roles in series such as Bones followed, before playing the role of Danny Ortiz in 2014 alongside Liam Neeson in the movie A Walk Among the Tombstones. In 2015, he gained more prominence as Horacio Carrillo in the Netflix series Narcos.

He also starred as Diego Jimenez on the Starz drama Power (2014–2020) and later as Kevin Jimenez on Mayans M.C. (2018), the spinoff of the FX television series Sons of Anarchy.

== Filmography ==
=== Film ===
Year	Title	Role	Notes
1996	The Substitute	Tay	
1996	Illtown	Pep	
1999	The Dream Catcher	Freddy	
1999	Eastside	Toad	
2000	Before Night Falls	Nicolas Abreu	
2000	Dancing at the Blue Iguana	Drug Buyer	
2001	Double Whammy	Jo Jo	
2002	Showtime	Chili	
2002	Deuces Wild	Maurice	
2003	All the Real Girls	Bo	
2006	Big Top	Rico	
2007	Poet's War	Garcia	
2008	They Never Saw Us Coming	Waleed	
2009	Spoken Word	George	
2009	Civil Strife	Fallah	
2009	Tribal Negotiations	Fallah	
2009	After Action Review	Fallah	
2010	Guess Who's Coming to Dinner	Hakim	
2011	Yelling to the Sky	Junior Oriol	
2011	The Blue of Noon	Percival Blue	
2012	End of Watch	Big Evil	
2012	I Do	Mano Alfaro	
2014	Sabotage	Sapo	
2014	Echo Park	Mateo	
2014	A Walk Among the Tombstones	Danny Ortiz	
2014	Search Party	Pelon	
2015	There Is a New World Somewhere	Esteban	
2015	Clarity	Omar	
2016	True Memoirs of an International Assassin	Juan	
2017	Once Upon a Time in Venice	Oscar	
2018	Den of Thieves	Benny Magalon	
2018	Perfect	Dr. Price	
2019	Once Upon a Time in Hollywood	Land Pirate Maurice	
2021	Born a Champion	Rosco	
2021	American Sicario	Roberto Feliz	
2023	Little Dixie	Lalo Miguel Prado	
2023	Don't Suck	DJ Minky	
2026	Hellfire	Salvadore	
2026	The Odyssey	Steward of Menelaus	

=== Television ===
Year	Title	Role	Notes
1997	Chicago Hope	Lead Gang Kid	Episode: "The Son Also Rises"
1997, 1999	NYPD Blue	Justin Candell / Gangbanger #2	2 episodes
1997	Pacific Blue	Caesar Zamora	Episode: "Blood for Blood"
2000	Angel	Chain	Episode: "War Zone"
2001	The Practice	Manny Guzman	Episode: "Home of the Brave"
2001	UC: Undercover	Rafael Ortega	Episode: "Of Fathers and Sons"
2002	Fidel	Raúl Castro	Television film
2003	Boomtown	Pedro Aguilar / Jaime Aguilar	Episode: "Sinaloa Cowboys"
2003	24	Cole	3 episodes
2003	CSI: Miami	Guillermo Soriano	Episode: "Body Count"
2004	Karen Sisco	Aldo	Episode: "Dog Day Sisco"
2005	CSI: NY	Michael Armstrong	Episode: "On the Job"
2005	Line of Fire	FBI Informant	Episode: "Born to Run"
2005	Wanted	Alvarez Kelly	Episode: "Click, Click, Boom"
2005–2006	E-Ring	Charlie Gutierrez	11 episodes
2008	Moonlight	Bustos	Episode: "Love Lasts Forever"
2008	Burn Notice	Trevor	Episode: "Scatter Point"
2009	Without a Trace	Mario Castro	Episode: "Friends and Neighbors"
2009	Life	Len Lyle Hix	Episode: "3 Women"
2009	Monk	Luke Johnston	Episode: "Mr. Monk Goes Camping"
2010	NCIS: Los Angeles	Rafael Taro	Episode: "Missing"
2010	FutureStates	Oscar	Episode: "The Rise"
2010	CSI: Crime Scene Investigation	Chalo Arua	Episode: "Irradiator"
2010	Lie to Me	Juan Campos	Episode: "Headlock"
2010–2012	Choke.Kick.Girl: The Series	Chatto	8 episodes
2011	Southland	Officer Rodrigo Morales	2 episodes
2011	Breaking Bad	Gaff	4 episodes
2013	Bones	Alex Garcia	Episode: "The Fact in the Fiction"
2013	Criminal Minds	Detective Mark Reyes	Episode: "The Return"
2015–2016	Narcos	Horacio Carrillo	12 episodes
2016	Hawaii Five-0	Levi Sosa	Episode: "Kuleana"
2016	Rush Hour	Carlos	Episode: "Pilot"
2016	From Dusk till Dawn: The Series	Brassa	6 episodes
2017	APB	Marcos Cruz	Episode: "Above & Beyond"
2017	Kevin Can Wait	Domingo	2 episodes
2017–2018	Power	Diego Jiménez	9 episodes
2018	Erase	Valentino	Television film
2018	Mayans M.C.	Kevin Jimenez	9 episodes
2018	The Last Ship	Gustavo Barros	8 episodes
2020	Deputy	Cartel Boss	Episode: "10-8 Firestone"
2020	The Fugitive	Alfredo Mengiora	Episode: "When Mike Met Ronnie"
2020–2021	In the Dark	Josiah	10 episodes
2022–2023	Law & Order: Special Victims Unit	Mike Duarte	4 episodes
