= Stephen Murphy (civil servant) =

DEA agent

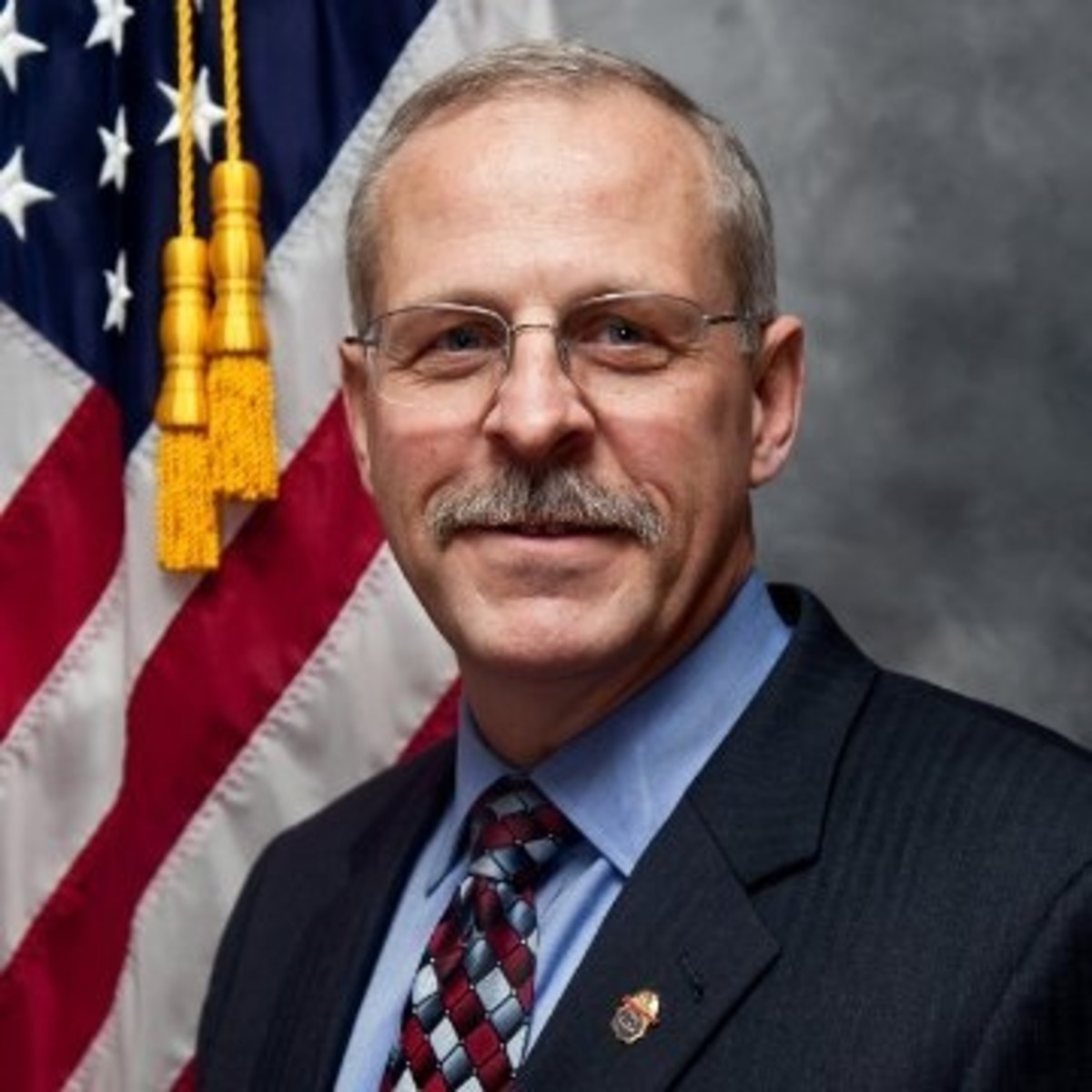
- Born: Stephen Murphy; 1957 (age 68–69); Tennessee, United States
- Occupation: DEA agent
- Years active: 1975–2013
- Known for: ex-DEA agent responsible for taking down Pablo Escobar
- Spouse: Donna Peters (Div.) Connie Murphy (m.)

Stephen E. Murphy (born 1957) is an American retired federal agent of the U.S. Drug Enforcement Administration (DEA) who, along with Javier Peña, was one of the lead investigators in the manhunt of Colombian drug lord and leader of the Medellín Cartel, Pablo Escobar. The story of this was told in the Netflix series Narcos, with actor Boyd Holbrook portraying Murphy. Murphy and Peña also worked on the show as consultants.

== Law enforcement career ==
Murphy began his law enforcement career at the age of 19 as an intern with the Bluefield, West Virginia Police Department. He subsequently joined the Bluefield PD as a uniform officer for 6 years, and later served as a police officer with the Norfolk Southern Railroad (formerly the Norfolk & Western Railroad) for approximately 6 years. He joined the DEA in 1987 and served until 2008.

== In popular culture ==
His character was played by actor Boyd Holbrook in the Netflix TV series Narcos. Murphy and Peña worked as consultants on the show and made a cameo appearance in the last episode of Season 2, "Al Fin Cayó!"

He was also portrayed by Peter Sarsgaard in Loving Pablo (2017), as DEA agent Shepherd.

In the 2013 TV series Alias El Mexicano, produced by Fox Telecolombia for RCN TV, he is portrayed by the actor Andrés Ogilvie Browne.

As of June 2021, Steve “Murph” Murphy has been the host of the “Game of Crimes” podcast.

== Books ==
Manhunters: How We Took Down Pablo Escobar co-written with Javier F. Peña.
