= Florencia Lozano =

American actress (born 1969)

- Born: December 16, 1969 (age 56); Princeton, New Jersey, U.S.
- Education: Brown University (BA); New York University (MFA)
- Occupation: Actress
- Years active: 1996–present

Florencia Lozano (born December 16, 1969) is an American actress of Argentine descent. She starred as Téa Delgado on the daytime series One Life to Live.

Lozano has guest-starred in several primetime television shows, as well as films.

== Early life ==
Florencia Lozano was born into an Argentine family in Princeton, New Jersey. Her father, Eduardo, is an architect, and her mother, Elizabeth, is a Spanish-language teacher. She grew up in Newton Centre, Massachusetts, and transferred out of Cornell University to receive her Bachelor of Arts from Brown University, before moving to New York City to earn her Master of Fine Arts degree at New York University's Graduate Acting Program at the Tisch School of the Arts. Lozano's regional theater credits include Yerma, Antigone, Hamlet, Caucasian Chalk Circle, among others.

== Career ==
Lozano landed the role of attorney Téa Delgado in December 1996 on the daytime drama One Life to Live, and first aired on January 27, 1997. The character became one of soap opera's most popular creations, and earned Lozano a loyal following. In 2002, almost two years after her departure from the series, Lozano was still receiving a significant amount of fan mail for her portrayal of the character. "I so appreciate that love coming at me," she said. "The response to Téa still overwhelms me." She further relayed, "I left because I wanted to try other things. I really want to do more theater, film and television other than the soap. When you're doing a soap, it is really hard to do other things. It just takes so much of your time."

During her tenure on One Life to Live, Lozano was in an Off Broadway play called Lick in June 1999; from August to September 2000, she appeared in Love's Labor Lost, a Shakespearean play produced out of Berkeley in Orinda, CA. In addition to her popularity with soap opera fans, Lozano was named one of "Daytime's Hardest Working Women" by About.com, and titled one of soap opera's "Most Beautiful Women" by magazine Soap Opera Update.

After leaving daytime, Lozano moved on to prime time television and film; some of her television credits are Law & Order: Criminal Intent, Law & Order: Special Victims Unit, Gossip Girl, and Lipstick Jungle. Of her prime time transition to film, Lozano stated, "I'm playing homicide detectives a lot," referring to her roles in Perfect Stranger and The Ministers. "I don't know why," she added, "but I love it!"

To prepare for the roles, Lozano – who had lived in Manhattan for 15 years – visited the homicide division of her local police precinct. "I've been hanging out with cops, and they've been so wonderful," she said. "One of them, Irma Rivera, and I have become friends. She introduced me to a firearms instructor who showed me how to shoot a machine gun, and she took me up to the NYPD training village." Prepared, Lozano portrayed Lieutenant Karen Tejada in the April 13, 2007 release, Perfect Stranger. "I interrogate Halle Berry and I end up arresting Bruce Willis," Lozano relayed. The storyline centers around Berry's character going undercover to solve a friend's murder, and engaging in an on-line romantic life. "It's very mysterious and full of intrigue," stated Lozano. Acting with prominent film stars was a "rewarding experience" for Lozano. "Halle is so gorgeous," she stated, "and she has a very beautiful energy about her. She was fun to play with, open to ideas, and willing to try new stuff and really excited." Lozano said, "Bruce was fun, too, in a different way. He let me push him around and manhandle him. I was surprised."

When Lozano acquired the lead role in The Ministers, opposite John Leguizamo and Harvey Keitel, she was again prepared. Filmed in February 2007, the crime thriller is about a female NYPD detective (Lozano) who tries to avenge the murder of her police officer father by what she presumed to be a cult. But unwittingly, she falls for one of the killers (Leguizamo) in the process. "Harvey plays my partner – he used to be my father's partner," Lozano stated. A fan of Leguizamo, Lozano was excited to work with him. "He was cracking jokes, and we were always busting on each other," said Lozano. "I felt really comfortable with him."

The opportunity to carry a film was a longtime goal for Lozano, who enjoyed the experience. "It's really a great feeling when your dreams come true. It may sound cheesy but I was like, 'Wow, I got what I wanted!'" she stated. "My training in theater and daytime really paid off – I have never appreciated being on a soap as much as I do now, because we moved very fast on this movie."

Lozano still looks to do more theater and is also pursuing television opportunities. Queried on whether she would ever reprise her role of Téa on One Life to Live, she stated, "I will never close any door, especially not a door that has been so wonderful for me to walk through."

In September 2008, Soap Opera Weekly reported Lozano's return to One Life to Live; she reprised her role as Téa in December 2008 and would play the character until the shows finale in January 2012. In the meantime, she guest-starred on Ugly Betty, portraying Penelope Del Rios in the episode "Filing for the Enemy". In March 2012, Soap Opera Digest reported that Lozano would be bringing her One Life to Live character to General Hospital the week of May 7, 2012. Her debut aired May 9, and she last appeared on December 3.

In 2016, Lozano was cast in a series regular role for the second season in the Netflix crime drama series Narcos playing agent Claudia Messina.

== Personal life ==
Lozano is a trained dancer, whose talents range from ballet to jazz, modern and flamenco. She became romantically involved with Christopher Welch in 1997, who was later featured in the 2002 Broadway revival of The Crucible. While New York theater plays kept Lozano and Welch busy, Lozano planned to stay on the East Coast. "I went to California, and I realized that while I could work out there, I could never live there," she stated. "There's just something that feels like home about New York. And there is something about theater that just feels so satisfying. [It] is really what I love to do."

== Filmography ==
Film
Year	Title	Role	Notes
2005	Bittersweet Place	Wendy	
2007	Perfect Stranger	Lieutenant Tejada	
2008	Deception	Clancey receptionist	
2009	2B	Vicky Borano	
2009	Veronika Decides to Die	Dr. Thompson	
2009	The Ministers	Celeste Santana	
2011	Remember	Elena	Short film
2013	Life of Crime	Anjelica	
2013	7E	Sadie	
2015	Amok	Lois	
2016	Amy Makes Three	Eileen Hubble	Unreleased
2022	My Love Affair with Marriage	Zelma's Mother	

Television
Year	Title	Role	Notes
1997–2000, 2002, 2008–2013	One Life to Live	Téa Delgado	Role held: January 27, 1997 – March 2, 2000; May 14 – September 17, 2002; December 5, 2008 – January 13, 2012; April 29 – August 19, 2013
2003	Law & Order: Criminal Intent	Octavia Ruiz	Episode: "The Gift"
2004	The Jury	Dr. Callie Zebula	Episode: "Too Jung to Die"
2007	Gossip Girl	Eleanor Waldorf	Episode: "Pilot"
2007	Law & Order: Special Victims Unit	Lauren Molby	Episode: "Avatar"
2007	Law & Order: Criminal Intent	Theresa Quinn	Episode: "Amends"
2008	Lipstick Jungle	Salesgirl	Episode: "Chapter Three: Pink Poison"
2008	Ugly Betty	Penelope Del Rios	Episode: "Filing for the Enemy"
2010	Royal Pains	Faith	Episode: "Keeping the Faith"
2010	Blue Bloods	Sophia Calso	Episode: "Privilege"
2012	General Hospital	Téa Delgado	Role held: May 9 – June 8, 2012; September 6 – October 17, 2012; November 29 – December 3, 2012
2014	The Mysteries of Laura	Dr. Lens	Episode: "The Mystery of the Fertility Fatality"
2016	Narcos	Claudia Messina	Series regular
2017	The Blacklist	Doctor	Episode: "Natalie Luca"
2017–2018	Kevin Can Wait	Wendy	2 episodes
2018	Madam Secretary	Dr. Ruth Hubbard	2 episodes
2019	The Enemy Within	Elizabeth Cordova	Recurring role

== Awards and nominations ==
Year	Award	Category	Work	Result
1998	Soap Opera Digest Award	Outstanding Female Newcomer	One Life to Live	Nominated
1998	ALMA Award	Outstanding Actress in a Daytime Soap Opera	One Life to Live	Nominated
1999	ALMA Award	Outstanding Actress in a Daytime Soap Opera	One Life to Live	Nominated
2000	ALMA Award	Outstanding Actress in a Daytime Soap Opera	One Life to Live	Nominated

== See also ==
- List of Argentines
