= Laura Perico =

Colombian actress (born 1989)

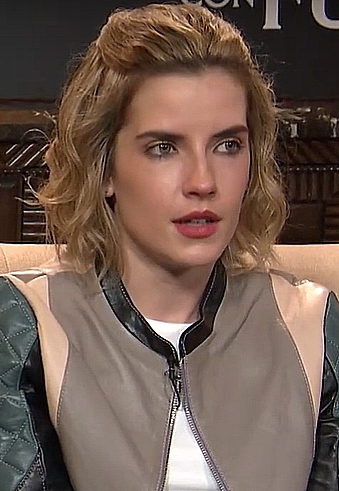
- Perico in 2019
- Born: Laura Perico Quintero; September 29, 1989 (age 37); Bogotá, Colombia
- Occupation: Actress
- Spouse: Domagoj Rózic (m. 2012)
- Children: 2

Laura Perico (born September 29, 1989) is a Colombian actress of Italian descent.

== Filmography ==
=== Telenovelas ===
Year	Title	Role
2003	Francisco el Matemático	Danae "La Mutante"
2004	Padres e Hijos	
2005	Juego Limpio	Cecilia Patricia "Patico" González
2005	Juegos Prohibidos	
2006	Amores de Mercado	Natalia Álamo
2007	Pocholo	Sara Larrea
2007	Pura Sangre	Young Irene Lagos
2007-2008	Victoria	Mariana Mendoza Santiesteban
2009	El Penúltimo Beso	Clara de Luna Izquierdo Preciado
2010	Rosario Tijeras	Leticia de Bedout
2010	El clon	Natalia Ferrer Antonelli
2012	¿Dónde está Elisa?	Elisa León Jiménez
2014	Dr. Mata	Elvira Ferro
2014	La suegra	Carolina López de Burgos
2015	Narcos	Marina Ochoa
2016	La niña	Juliana Montealegre
2018	Garzón vive	Tatiana Saénz Santamaría
2018	El Rey del Valle	Anabel del Valle
2019	Bolívar	Elsa Gonzáles
2019	Juego con Fuego	Andrea Jaramillo
2020	Los Internacionales	Mafe García
