= Patrick St. Esprit =

American actor

- Born: May 18, 1954 (age 72); California, U.S.
- Other name: Patrick Lincoln
- Occupation: Actor
- Years active: 1982–present
- Spouse(s): Valerie Leigh Bixler-Young (m. 1980; div. 1982) Tawny Moyer

Patrick St. Esprit (born May 18, 1954) is an American character actor, best known for playing tough, authoritative roles such as Romulus Thread in The Hunger Games: Catching Fire, Elliot Oswald in Sons of Anarchy and LAPD Commander Robert Hicks in S.W.A.T.

== Partial filmography ==
=== Film ===
Year	Title	Role	Notes
1986	Fire in the Night	Mike Swanson	
1997	The Protector	Security Guard	
2001	Not Another Teen Movie	Austin's Father	
2002	We Were Soldiers	General in hall	
2003	King of the Ants	Sgt. Moorse	
2005	Crash Landing	Pilot Craig	
2006	United 93	Major Kevin Nasypany	
2006	Smokin' Aces	Moustache	
2010	Chain letter	Dean Jones	
2010	Green Zone	Military Intel 2 Star (Hayes)	
2011	Super 8	Weapons Commander	
2012	Blue Lagoon: The Awakening	Jack McMullen	
2013	The Hunger Games: Catching Fire	Commander Romulus Thread	
2013	The Last of Robin Hood	Herb Aadland	
2014	Draft Day	Tom Michaels	
2015	Truth	General Buck Standt	
2016	Independence Day: Resurgence	Secretary of Defense Reese Tanner	
2016	I Am Wrath	Governor John Meserve	
2016	War Dogs	Captain Phillip Santos	
2017	The Fate of the Furious	DS Allan	
2018	Acts of Violence	Hemland	

=== Television ===
Year	Title	Role	Notes
1982	Police Squad!	Buddy Briggs	Episode: "Ring of Fear (A Dangerous Assignment)"
1985	Knight Rider	Tommy-Lee Burgess	Episode: "Knight by a Nose"
1988–1991	Hunter	Dino Morelli, Jack Coldfax	Episodes: "Ring of Honor" (season 5), "All that Glitters" (season 7)
1990	Matlock	Rick Allen	Episode: "The Witness"
1993	Raven	Junior Allen (uncredited)	Episode: "Death Games"
1993–2001	Walker, Texas Ranger	Lester Rawlins/Quint/Brad Furnell/Darby & Jack Garret	5 episodes
1994	Dr. Quinn, Medicine Woman	Carl	Episode: "Ladies Night"
2002	Angel	Jenoff	Episode: "Double or Nothing"
2003	George Lopez	Special Agent Saunders	Episode: "Dubya Dad and Dating"
2004	Monk	Lody	Episode: "Monk Goes to Jail"
1999–2005	JAG	Colonel	4 episodes
2007	Desperate Housewives	Detective Berry	Episode: "Distant Past"
2007	Cold Case	Porter Rawley (2007)	Episode: "Blood on the Tracks"
2007–2010	Saving Grace	Leo Hanadarko	
2008	Criminal Minds	Sheriff Merrill Dobson	Episode: "The Angel Maker"
2008–2014	Sons of Anarchy	Elliott Oswald	
2009	NCIS	Ship Commander	Episode: "South by Southwest"
2010	Castle	Special Agent Forrest	Episode: "Sucker Punch"
2010	House	Keith Tannenbaum	Episode: "5 to 9"
2010	The Mentalist	Frank Lockhardt	Episode: "The Red Ponies"
2011	The Chicago Code	Hugh Killian	4 episodes
2011–2017	NCIS: Los Angeles	LAPD Lieutenant Roger Bates	4 episodes
2012	CSI: NY	Gerald Branson	Episode: "Brooklyn 'Til I Die"
2012	Body of Proof	Leonard Waxman	Episode: "Falling for You"
2012	Rizzoli & Isles	Detective Artie McMurphy	Episode: "Welcome to the Dollhouse"
2013	Scandal	Peter Foster	Episode: "Mrs. Smith Goes to Washington"
2013	Revolution	Commander Ramsey	3 episodes
2014	Hawaii Five-0	Vice Admiral Graham Rhodes	2 episodes
2014	Homeland	Aaron	Episode: "The Drone Queen"
2014	Scorpion	Captain Pike	Episode: "Pilot"
2015–2016	Narcos	Colonel Louis Wysession	8 episodes
2016	Killing Reagan	Alexander Haig	TV movie
2016	The Last Ship	Colonel Witt	2 episodes
2017–2025	S.W.A.T.	LAPD Commander Robert Hicks	Recurring (season 1); Regular (season 2 – 8)
2018	Unsolved	Chief William Bratton	3 episodes
2026	S.W.A.T. Exiles	LAPD Commander Robert Hicks	1 episode

=== Video games ===
Year	Title	Role	Notes
2013	Battlefield 4	Captain Roland Garrison	
