= Chris Brancato =

American screenwriter and film producer

- Born: July 24, 1962 (age 64); Teaneck, New Jersey, U.S.
- Occupations: Screenwriter, film producer

Chris Brancato (born July 24, 1962) is an American television and film writer and producer.

== Early life ==
Brancato grew up in Teaneck, New Jersey and graduated in 1980 from Teaneck High School. He subsequently attended and graduated from Brown University.

== Career ==
Brancato wrote or was story editor for several episodes of the 1992 season of Beverly Hills, 90210. He co-wrote the X-Files episode ”Eve“, which first aired on December 10, 1993. Brancato created and wrote Space Channel's First Wave, which aired from 1998 to 2001, and also wrote the 1998 film Species II.

Brancato wrote the 1997 film Hoodlum set in crime-ridden 1930s New York City.

Brancato was executive producer of the 2002 film Stealing Harvard. Brancato was also a writer/producer for the critically acclaimed 2002–2003 television series Boomtown.

Brancato wrote two episodes during season 12 of the long-running NBC legal drama, Law & Order: Special Victims Unit, titled "Branded" and "Spectacle". Brancato moved on to be executive producer/show runner/head writer for the tenth season of the USA Network police-procedural Law & Order: Criminal Intent, a show that is related to Law & Order: SVU. Brancato did a police-procedural pilot for NBC titled Blue Tilt, where he was creator/executive producer with Vincent D'Onofrio (Law & Order: Criminal Intent) and Ethan Hawke, who were also set to star in the project as well. On May 11, 2012, NBC decided not to bring it, and other pilots, to series. He created the Netflix series Narcos and Narcos: Mexico with Carlo Bernard and Doug Miro.

Brancato was credited as a co-screenwriter for third Sherlock Holmes film along with Joel Silver, Susan Downey and Lionel Wigram returning as producers, and Village Roadshow returning as co-producer. Warner Bros confirmed the third film will include Robert Downey, Jr. and Jude Law. The film had an expected release date December 22, 2021 but is currently undated.

Brancato is an executive producer, writer, and creator of the three MGM+ series Godfather of Harlem, Hotel Cocaine and The Westies.

== Filmography ==
=== Television ===
Year	Title	Writer	Producer	Creator	Notes
1992	Beverly Hills, 90210	Yes	No	No	4 episodes
1993	The X-Files	Yes	No	No	1 episode
1995	Robin's Hoods	Yes	No	No	1 episode
1995	Burke's Law	Yes	No	No	2 episodes
1996-1998	The Outer Limits	Yes	No	No	4 episodes
1998-2001	First Wave	Yes	Executive	Yes	66 episodes
2002	Crossing Jordan	No	Consulting	No	2 episodes
2002-2003	Boomtown	Yes	Co-executive	No	2 episodes
2003	Miracles	Yes	No	No	1 episode
2003	Tru Calling	Yes	Consulting	No	1 episode, consulted for production of 12 episodes
2004	North Shore	Yes	Executive	No	1 episode
2006	Secrets of a Small Town	No	Yes	No	1 episode
2007	Football Wives	No	Yes	No	TV short
2010-2011	Law & Order: Special Victims Unit	Yes	No	No	2 episodes
2011	Law & Order: Criminal Intent	Yes	Yes	No	2 episodes, executive produced 8 episodes
2011	Terra Nova	No	Consulting	No	2 episodes
2012	The Firm	No	Executive	No	12 episodes
2013-2014	Hannibal	Yes	Executive	No	4 episodes, executive produced 26 episodes
2015-2017	Narcos	Yes	Executive	Yes	30 episodes, consulted or produced 12 episodes
2016	Of Kings and Prophets	No	Executive	Yes	9 episodes
2018-2021	Narcos: Mexico	Yes	No	Yes	21 episodes
2019-2025	Godfather of Harlem	Yes	Executive	Yes	36 episodes
2020	By Whatever Means Necessary: The Times of Godfather of Harlem	No	Co-executive	No	Miniseries
2024	Hotel Cocaine	Yes	Executive	Yes	8 episodes
2026–present	The Westies	Yes	Executive	Yes	8 episodes

TV movies

Year	Title	Writer	Executive producer
2002	Flashpoint	Yes	Yes
2003	Then Came Jones	No	Yes
2003	The Break	No	Yes
2005	Murder Book	Yes	Yes
2006	Sixty Minute Man	Yes	Yes
2006	Drift	No	Yes
2008	The Prince of Motor City	No	Yes
2010	True Blue	Yes	Yes
2017	Las Reinas	No	Yes

=== Feature film ===
Writer

- Hoodlum (1997) (Also co-producer)
- Species II (1998)

Executive producer

- Stealing Harvard (2002)
