= Hugo Martínez (police officer) =

Colombian police officer (1941–2020)

- Born: October 16, 1941; Moniquirá, Boyacá, Colombia.
- Died: March 22, 2020 (aged 78); Hospital de la policia, Medellín
- Military career
- Allegiance: Colombia
- Branch: Policía Nacional de Colombia
- Service years: 1964–1999
- Rank: General
- Commands: Search Bloc
- Conflicts: Death of Pablo Escobar; Colombian conflict

General Hugo Rafael Martínez Poveda (16 October 1941 – 22 March 2020) was a Colombian police general. He was assigned the new commander of the Search Bloc, a unit of the National Police of Colombia assembled by President Virgilio Barco Vargas in 1986; he was tasked with the sole objective of the apprehension of drug lord Pablo Escobar and his associates.

His son, Lieutenant Hugo Martínez Bolivar, Jr. (1969–2003), was involved in Escobar's death by locating his hideout in the Los Olivos neighborhood and leading the troops alongside Police Lt. Col. Hugo Aguilar. The younger Martínez had announced that Escobar was shot three times in the back, leg, and right temple from an AR-15 fired by Sgt. Jorge Armando Guerrero Pasichana (who was killed in 1995).

Martínez retired to the city of Bogotá in 1999 after 40 years of service with the National Police of Colombia. His son, Martínez Jr., was killed in a traffic accident in 2003. On 22 March 2020, Martínez died, suffering a heart attack while hospitalized.

== In fiction ==
- In TV Series Pablo Escobar, The Drug Lord is portrayed by the Colombian actor Jimmy Vásquez as the character of Martín Pabón.
- In TV series Alias El Mexicano is portrayed by Juan Carlos Serrano as the character of Diego Erazo 'Radar'.
- In the Netflix series Narcos, Hugo Martínez served as inspiration for the character Colonel Horacio Carrillo portrayed by Maurice Compte. Later in the series, Martínez was introduced as a separate character, portrayed by Juan Pablo Shuk.
