= Joanna Christie =

British actress (born 1982)

- Born: Joanna Lauren Christie; 10 April 1982 (age 44); Huddersfield, West Yorkshire, England
- Education: Mountview Academy of Theatre Arts
- Occupation: Actress
- Years active: 2006–present
- Height: 5 ft 7 in (170 cm)

Joanna Lauren Christie (born 10 April 1982) is an English actress and singer. She is noted for her work in the play Equus (2007) alongside Daniel Radcliffe, but is best known for her role as Girl in the Broadway musical Once. Christie played Connie Murphy, one of the lead female characters, in the hit Netflix television series Narcos.

== Early life ==
Christie was born and raised in Huddersfield, in West Yorkshire until the age of 13, when she was awarded a music scholarship to study flute, piano, and voice at Oundle School in Northamptonshire. Five years later, she moved to London to attend drama school at Mountview Academy of Theatre Arts.

Christie joined the National Youth Theatre at 17, where she made her breakthrough stage role in Immaculate Conceit, a play about a stripper who is pregnant with the next messiah. She then found small roles in television, before joining Kevin Spacey's Old Vic, New Voices collective for a year in 2005. She was delighted to be part of the collective of actors taking part in the 24-hour plays at The Old Vic. The group received its name because Spacey, who selected the actors, believed them to be the best new actors around.

After a five-month tour of India performing Shakespeare's A Midsummer Night's Dream in Jaipur in 2006, she returned to Britain, but endured a lean year and nearly gave up acting altogether when she landed the role of Jill Mason in her West End debut in Equus at the Gielgud Theatre. She beat over 300 other actresses to the role opposite Harry Potter star Daniel Radcliffe in Thea Sharrock's high-profile revival of Peter Shaffer's award-winning play.

== Personal life ==
Christie has lived in New York since April 2013 and her hobbies include yoga, running, kickboxing, and scuba diving. She used to be part of her brother's band called Luke J Christie & The Held Breath until she moved to New York City to star as Girl in Once.

== Road to Broadway ==
Christie said that being on Broadway is "every dream [she's] ever had come true." However, right before she landed the role in Once, she was about to give up. "I felt like I was at my lowest, and I decided to go back to university to do anthropology," she said in an interview with broadway.com. Her audition process was rather strenuous, having to learn two full songs on the piano and three scenes in a Czech accent in a mere 24 hours.

== Music projects ==
Christie recorded a song called "This Gift" with Glen Hansard, who composed many of the songs in Once. The song was released on his solo album, Rhythm and Repose. She says that it is "one of the biggest honours of my life so far...I still can't quite believe it!"

On 20 April 2014, she collaborated with her Once cast members and contributed her piano and vocal talents for a live-album recording of the Adam Brown and Friends performance at the Bowery Poetry Club.

== Family ==
Christie's mother, Sue, in addition to conducting for the Millhouse Green Male Voice choir in Penistone, sings with The Mastersingers. Her father Paul, who died in 2012, was a property developer. Her brother Luke is also a musician, singer, and songwriter. The pair have a band together called Luke J Christie & The Held Breath. She was inspired by her parents, who taught her that she "could do anything [she] wanted in life and to always be [her]self and follow [her] own path." She has been highly influenced by her parents her whole life. "I owe all my success to my parents for giving me the opportunities to get to this point in my career and I would like to pay tribute to them...I'm just so grateful to my mum for giving me the gift of music and to both her and my dad for always supporting and encouraging me," she explained in a 2013 interview with the Huddersfield Daily Examiner.

== Filmography ==
=== Television ===
Year	Title	Role	Notes
2005	Holby City	Victoria Walsh	
2005	No Angels	Kirsty Lanning	
2008	Lewis	Sarah Kriel	
2008	Star	Star	
2008	Small Dark Places	Christine Welling	
2011	Misfits	Jo	
2012	Doctors	Kerry Longley	
2012	Starlings	Nurse Trudy	
2013	Mr Selfridge	Young Suffragette	
2015–2016	Narcos	Connie Murphy	Main Cast; 14 episodes
2017	Elementary	May	2 episodes
2018	Hawaii Five-0	Brooke Gardner	1 episode
2019	The Blacklist	Olivia Olson	1 episode

=== Theatre ===
Year	Title	Role	Notes
1999	Immaculate Conceit	Sofia	Lyric Hammersmith
2005	A Course in A Restaurant	Julie	The Old Vic
2005	Carsinoma	Collette	The Old Vic
2006	Alice's Midsummer Night's Dream	Alice	City Palace
2007	Equus	Jill Mason	Gielgud Theatre
2008	One Night in November	Katie Stanley	Belgrade Theatre
2009	School For Scandal	Maria	Greenwich Theatre
2009	Doctor Faustus	Evil Angel/Helen of Troy	Greenwich Theatre
2012	Bloody Poetry	Claire Clairmont	Jermyn Street Theatre
2013	Once	Girl	Bernard B. Jacobs Theatre
