= Pedro Pascal on screen and stage =

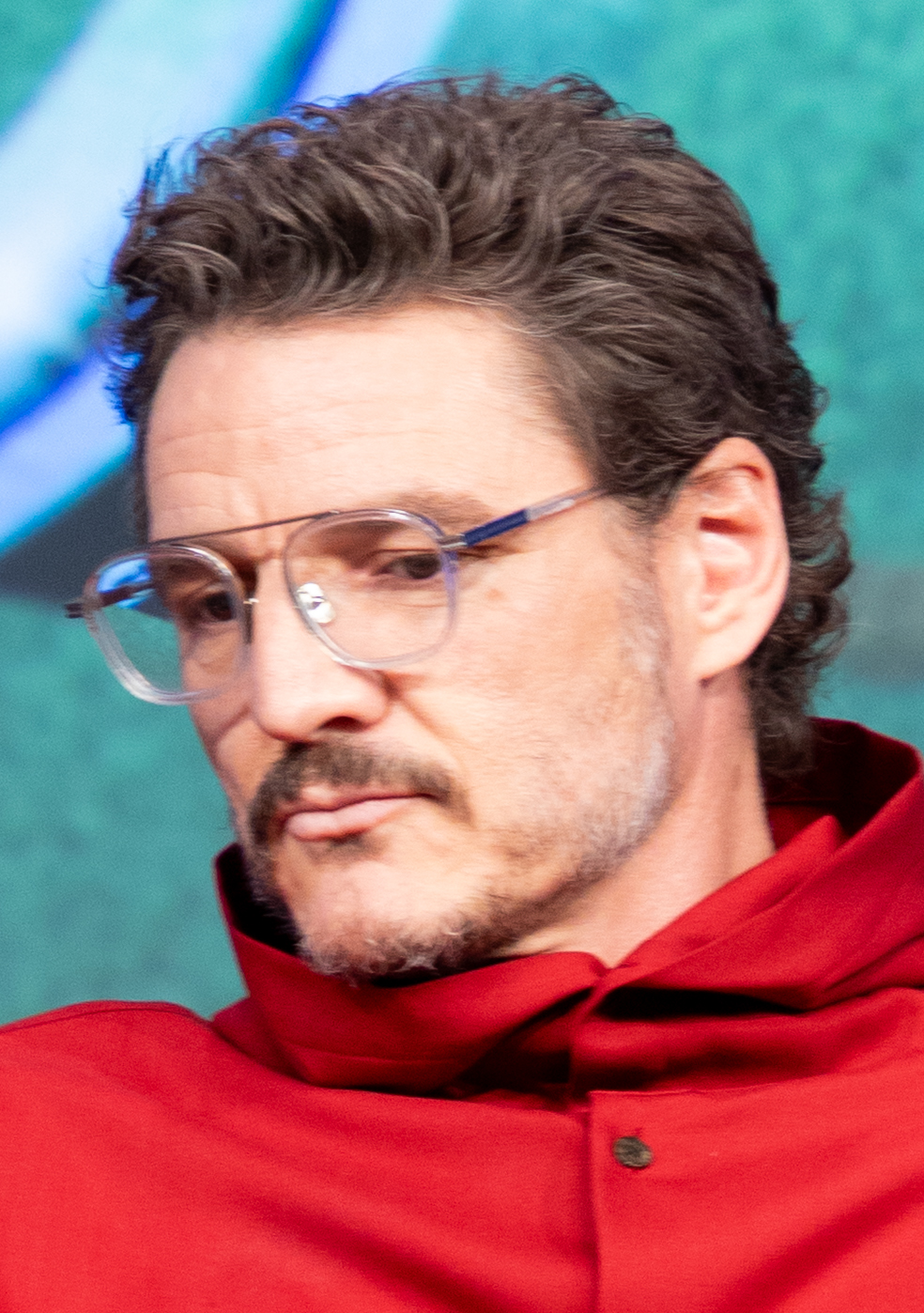
Pascal in 2025

Pedro Pascal is a Chilean and American actor who has appeared on stage and screen. Beginning his career with theatre and small television roles, Pascal rose to prominence for portraying Oberyn Martell in the fourth season of the HBO fantasy series Game of Thrones (2014) and Javier Peña in the Netflix crime series Narcos (2015–2017). He appeared in the 2017 film Kingsman: The Golden Circle and starred as Dave York in the action-thriller film The Equalizer 2 (2018) and as Francisco "Catfish" Morales in the action-adventure film Triple Frontier (2019).

Pascal achieved worldwide fame with his leading roles as Din Djarin in the Disney+ Star Wars series The Mandalorian (2019–present) and Joel Miller in the HBO post-apocalyptic drama series The Last of Us (2023–present), after which he became recognized for his portrayals of adoptive father figures to gifted children. He received several accolades for the latter performance, including winning a Screen Actors Guild Award and a People's Choice Award, and receiving nominations for a Primetime Emmy Award and a Golden Globe Award.

Pascal has also appeared in the superhero films Wonder Woman 1984 and We Can Be Heroes (both 2020), the action-comedy film The Unbearable Weight of Massive Talent (2022), the television series The Mentalist (2014) and Animal (2021), and made a guest appearance on the Fox animated sitcom HouseBroken in 2023. He co-starred with Temuera Morrison in the miniseries The Book of Boba Fett (2022), reprising his role from The Mandalorian. In American theatre, Pascal has had roles in several Shakespearean plays. He wrote one original play and has directed four performances in his career. He made his Broadway debut as Edmund in a 2019 production of King Lear at the James Earl Jones Theatre.

== Film ==
Key
†	Denotes films that have not yet been released

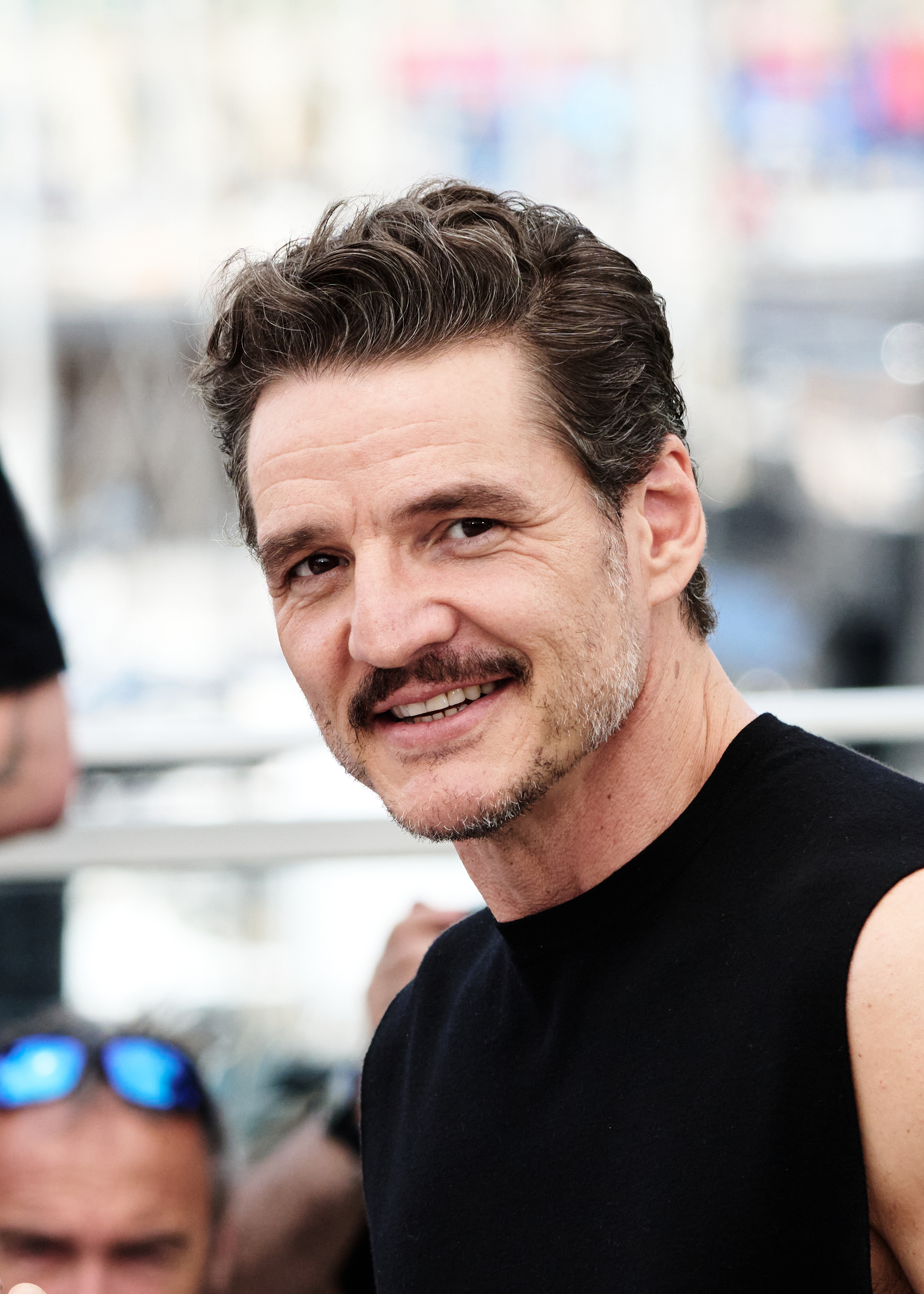
Pascal in 2025 Cannes Film Festival

Year	Title	Role	Notes	Ref.
1996	Burning Bridges	Alex	Short film; credited as Pedro Balmaceda	
1997	Window Shopping	David	Short film; credited as Pedro Balmaceda	
2005	Sisters	Steve		
2008	I Am That Girl	Noah		
2009	Iris	Billy	Short film	
2011	The Adjustment Bureau	Maitre D' Paul De Santo		
2011	Sweet Little Lies	Paulino		
2015	Bloodsucking Bastards	Max		
2015	Sweets	Twin Peter		
2016	The Great Wall	Pero Tovar		
2017	Kingsman: The Golden Circle	Jack Daniels / Agent Whiskey		
2018	Prospect	Ezra		
2018	The Equalizer 2	Dave York		
2018	If Beale Street Could Talk	Pietro Alvarez		
2019	Triple Frontier	Francisco "Catfish" Morales		
2020	Wonder Woman 1984	Maxwell Lord		
2020	We Can Be Heroes	Marcus Moreno		
2022	The Unbearable Weight of Massive Talent	Javi Gutierrez		
2022	The Bubble	Dieter Bravo		
2022	House Comes with a Bird	Nico	Short film	
2023	Strange Way of Life	Silva	Short film	
2024	Freaky Tales	Clint		
2024	Drive-Away Dolls	Santos	Cameo	
2024	The Uninvited	Lucien Flores		
2024	The Wild Robot	Fink	Voice role	
2024	Gladiator II	General Marcus Acacius		
2025	Eddington	Mayor Ted Garcia		
2025	Materialists	Harry Castillo		
2025	The Fantastic Four: First Steps	Reed Richards / Mister Fantastic		
2026	The Mandalorian and Grogu	The Mandalorian / Din Djarin		
2026	Behemoth!	Alex Serian		
2026	Avengers: Doomsday †	Reed Richards / Mister Fantastic	Post-production	
TBA	De Noche †	Richard Rent	Post-production	

== Television ==
Year	Title	Role	Notes	Ref.
1999	Good vs Evil	Gregor New	Episode: "Gee Your Hair Smells Evil"	
1999	Downtown	Raver Guy	Voice role; Episode: "Hot Spot"	
1999	Undressed	Greg	Recurring role; 3 episodes (season one)	
1999	Buffy the Vampire Slayer	Eddie	Episode: "The Freshman"	
2000	Touched by an Angel	Ricky	Episode: "Stealing Hope"	
2001	NYPD Blue	Shane "Dio" Morrissey	Episode: "Oh Golly Goth"	
2001	Earth vs. the Spider	Goth Guy	Television film	
2006, 2009	Law & Order: Criminal Intent	Reggie Luckman	Episode: "Weeping Willow"	
2006, 2009	Law & Order: Criminal Intent	Kevin "Kip" Green	Episode: "The Glory That Was..."	
2006	Without a Trace	Kyle Wilson	Episode: "Candy"	
2008	Law & Order	Tito Cabassa	Episode: "Tango"	
2009–2011	The Good Wife	Nathan Landry	Recurring role; 6 episodes (seasons 1–2)	
2010	Nurse Jackie	Steve	Episode: "Twitter"	
2011	Lights Out	Omar Assarian	Recurring role; 4 episodes	
2011	Brothers & Sisters	Zach Wellison	Episodes: "Brody" and "Home is Where the Fort Is"	
2011	Law & Order: Special Victims Unit	Special Agent Greer	Episode: "Smoked"	
2011	Charlie's Angels	Fredrick Mercer	Episode: "Angels in Paradise"	
2011	Wonder Woman	Ed Indelicato	Unsold television pilot	
2011	Burn Notice: The Fall of Sam Axe	Comandante Veracruz	Television film	
2012	Body of Proof	Zack Groffman	Episode: "Falling for You"	
2012	CSI: Crime Scene Investigation	Kyle Hartley	Episode: "Malice in Wonderland"	
2013	Nikita	Liam	Episode: "Aftermath"	
2013	Red Widow	Jay Castillo	Recurring role; 4 episodes	
2013	Homeland	David Portillo	Episode: "Tin Man Is Down"	
2013	The Sixth Gun	Special Agent Ortega	Unsold television pilot	
2013–2014	Graceland	Juan Badillo	Recurring role; 11 episodes (seasons 1–2)	
2014	The Mentalist	Marcus Pike	Recurring role (season 6), Guest star (season 7); 7 episodes	
2014	Game of Thrones	Oberyn Martell	Recurring role; 7 episodes (season 4)	
2015	Exposed	Oscar Castro Vargas	Unsold television pilot	
2015–2017	Narcos	Javier Peña	Main role; 30 episodes	
2019–2023	The Mandalorian	The Mandalorian / Din Djarin	Lead role; 24 episodes	
2020	Home Movie: The Princess Bride	Inigo Montoya	Episode: "Chapter Two: The Shrieking Eels"	
2021	Calls	Pedro	Voice role; Episode: "Pedro Across the Street"	
2021	Amend: The Fight for America	Himself	Episodes: "Citizen" and "Resistance"	
2021	Animal	Narrator	Episode: "Octopus"	
2022	The Book of Boba Fett	The Mandalorian / Din Djarin	Main role; 3 episodes	
2022	Patagonia: Life on the Edge of the World	Narrator	Documentary miniseries	
2023–2025	The Last of Us	Joel Miller	Lead role; 13 episodes	
2023	Saturday Night Live	Himself (host)	Episode: "Pedro Pascal / Coldplay"	
2023	HouseBroken	Claude	Voice role; Episode: "Who’s a Homeowner?"	
2025	Saturday Night Live 50th Anniversary Special	Renaldo / Kermit	Television special	

== Theater ==
Year	Title	Role	Venue	Notes	Ref.
1999	Orphans	Phillip	International City Theatre		
2002	Fallen	Pascal	Liberty Hall Lowell		
2003	Lobby Hero	Jeff	WHAT Harbor Stage		
2003	Ghosts	Oswald Alving	Shakespeare Theater		
2004	Gizmo Love	Ralph	WHAT Harbor Stage		
2004	Anna in the Tropics	Juan Julian	Portland Center Stage		
2005	Lorenzaccio	Piero Strozzi	The Lansburgh Theatre		
2005	Troilus and Cressida	Thersites	Tectonic Theater Project		
2005	Hamlet	Horatio	Boston Common Parade Ground		
2006	Beauty of the Father	Karim	Manhattan Theatre Club	Off-Broadway	
2006	Based on a Totally True Story	Michael Sullivan	Manhattan Theatre Club	Off-Broadway	
2006	Macbeth	Ensemble / Bloody Sergeant / Murderer 2	Delacorte Theater	Off-Broadway	
2006	The Cartells	Emanuel	Comix NY		
2007	Some Men	Fritz / Mendy / David Goldman / RandyHunk / Zach / Lewis / Mel / Nurse Jack	Second Stage Theater	Off-Broadway	
2007	Hamlet	Horatio	The Lansburgh Theatre		
2008	Sand	Performer	Women’s Project Theater		
2008	Old Comedy After Aristophane's Frogs	Dionysus	Classic Stage Company	Off-Broadway	
2009	The Miracle at Naples	Tristano	The Virginia Wimberly Theatre		
2010	Killing Play	—N/a	Rattlestick Playwrights Theatre	Director	
2010	Flaca Loves Bone	—N/a	Rattlestick Playwrights Theatre	Writer	
2010	Yosemite	—N/a	Rattlestick Playwrights Theatre	Director	
2010	underneathmybed	—N/a	Rattlestick Playwrights Theatre	Director	
2011	Dark Matters	Enamorado	The Blank's 2nd Stage Theatre		
2011	Maple and Vine	Roger	Playwrights Horizons	Off-Broadway	
2012	Black Lace	—N/a	New Ohio Theatre	Director	
2014	Much Ado About Nothing	Don John	Public Theater	Off-Broadway	
2019	King Lear	Edmund	James Earl Jones Theatre	Broadway debut	

== Music videos ==
Music videos
Year	Artist	Song	Ref.
2015	Sia	"Fire Meet Gasoline"	
2020	Gal Gadot	"Imagine"	

== Video games ==
Video games
Year	Title	Role	Notes	Ref.
2016	Dishonored 2	Paolo		
2025	Fortnite Battle Royale	Reed Richards / Mister Fantastic	Likeness	
