= Moving Picture Institute =

Coordinates: 40.7195°N 74.0101°W

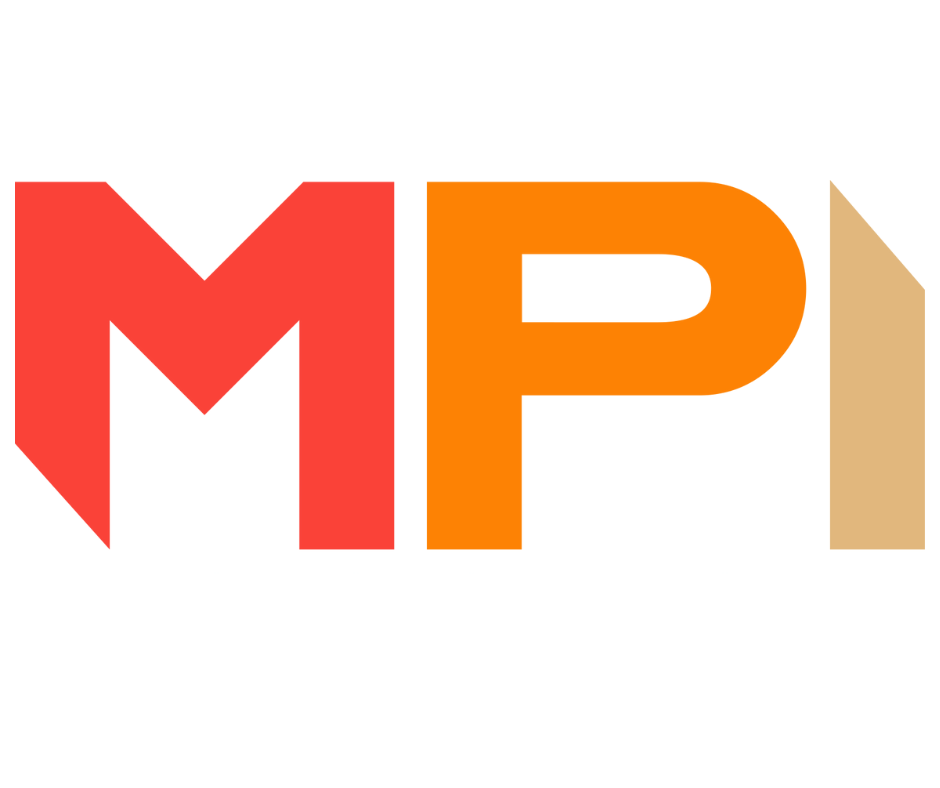
- Founded: 2005
- Founder: Thor Halvorssen
- Headquarters: New York, New York
- Region served: Worldwide, focusing on the United States
- Method: Filmmaking
- Revenue: $8.6 million (2024)
- Website: thempi.org

The Moving Picture Institute (MPI) is an American non-profit organization and film production company founded in 2005 by Thor Halvorssen. MPI's films focus on human freedoms. The organization's president is Rob Pfaltzgraff.

== Mission and purpose ==
MPI describes itself as "a production company and talent incubator that creates high-impact films designed to entertain, inspire, and educate audiences with captivating stories about human freedom."

It operates two main programs: the Rising Filmmaker Program, which supports emerging writers, directors, and producers through internships and mentoring, practical training, and a growing network of filmmakers; and MPI Original Films, which develops and distributes films that explore topics such as free speech, human rights, and government overreach.

MPI states its films typically center on concepts such as human rights and individual freedoms, and governmental waste and corruption. Halvorssen said to The New York Times "A film can reach a lot more people than a white paper [...] What Sideways did for Pinot noir, I want to do for freedom."

According to a June 2025 article in The Wall Street Journal, MPI "has produced a string of successful indie movies." Pinball: The Man Who Saved the Game (2022) is based on the true story of a journalist-turned-pinball player who in 1976 helped overturn New York City's 35-year ban on pinball. The film, which starred Mike Faist, won several film festival awards and was well received by critics. MPI also produced Freedom Hair, a true story about a woman whose hair braiding studio in Mississippi runs into trouble due to state licensing laws.

In 2025, MPI Original Films’ feature Motherland was cited in the The New York Times list of Five Science Fiction Movies to Stream Now, and they attached Josh Holloway (Lost) to star in their latest production One Second After. According to Variety, One Second After will be in theaters April 30, 2027.

== Rising Filmmaker Program ==
The Rising Filmmaker Program is the MPI's talent development initiative and the umbrella under which MPI’s Hollywood Career Launch Program, Short Film Lab, Documentary Storytelling Workshop, Production Lab, and Filmmaker Network function. Each year, the program invests in emerging writers, directors, producers, and executives. As of 2025, the Rising Filmmaker Program had distributed 960 fellowships.

=== Hollywood Career Launch Program ===
Launched in 2006, the Hollywood Career Launch Program provides paid internships for college students and recent graduates on the sets of MPI Original films and with partner production companies. Interns receive mentorship, training, and living stipends. Past cohorts have been placed at companies such as Skybound Entertainment, Millennium Media, and Bold Films.

=== Short Film Lab ===
The MPI Short Film Lab provides filmmakers with training to develop narrative film concepts into scripts for production. Participants receive fellowship grants and take part in screenwriting and directing workshops that teach storytelling, collaboration, and on-set leadership skills. Each year, the lab issues a call for applications, and one official selection receives a $10,000 prize, with promising projects considered for further development in the MPI Production Lab. In 2025, the Academy Award-qualifying Indy Shorts International Film Festival featured a special Spotlight: MPI Original Films Short Film Lab showcase, which premiered four MPI Originals developed through the program.

=== MPI Production Lab ===
The MPI Production Lab advances select projects from MPI’s Short Film Lab and Documentary Storytelling Workshop into full production as MPI Original Films. The lab provides participants with practical training and mentorship throughout the entire filmmaking process, from production to post-production, and prepares films for distribution and festival release. It has acquired multiple projects for development, including shorts such as A Piece of Cake, which was produced through the program and went on to screen at the Tribeca Film Festival.

=== Documentary Storytelling Workshop ===
The MPI Documentary Storytelling Workshop is designed for documentary filmmakers seeking to learn how to develop characters, craft compelling arcs, and balance narrative with argument. Participants receive a fellowship stipend and attend sessions where they share footage, exchange feedback with peers, and gain guidance from experienced documentarians. According to MPI, the strongest projects may advance into the Production Lab, where they are acquired for production as MPI Original films.

=== First Feature Lab ===
The MPI First Feature Lab is designed to support emerging writer-directors in developing and producing their first feature-length films. The lab involves working with early-career filmmakers on debut features. Participants begin with a Script Development Fellowship focused on completing a production-ready screenplay under professional mentorship and guidance from MPI producers. Select projects receive funding and are produced as MPI Original films.

=== Filmmaker Network ===
The MPI network connects like-minded professionals in the film industry in order to create and maintain a talent pipeline. MPI's programming targets two audiences: storytellers working as creatives and aspiring industry executives. With two decades of connection and work in the industry, this network has 200 active participants. MPI hosts a Rising Executive Summit, an Advanced Filmmaker Summit, a Producer’s Playbook seminar, and masterclasses as part of the Filmmaker Network.

== MPI Original Films ==
In its early years, MPI provided grants to filmmakers and supported independently produced films by emerging directors. During this period, MPI produced and released ten feature-length documentaries, three documentary shorts, three narrative shorts, and an educational series. The institute also created a dozen short documentaries and nearly 400 short-form videos for a digital platform.

In 2018, with the development of the production company MPI Original Films, MPI expanded into producing original content in-house. The 2019 release of Miss Virginia was the institute’s first internally produced narrative feature film. Since then, MPI Original Films has produced and distributed four additional narrative feature films and one feature documentary.

Through distribution deals with independent film companies like Vertical Entertainment, MPI films have theatrical releases and are distributed on streaming platforms including Netflix, Apple TV, Amazon Prime Video, Google Play, BET+, Starz, Tubi, and Fandango at Home. As of January 2026, in addition to feature films, MPI has also released 13 narrative shorts, four documentary shorts, and a series under the banner of MPI Original Films.

MPI Originals have been distributed internationally by companies including High Fliers, M-Net, and Espresso Media. For example, Miss Virginia was released in more than 90 countries including the United Kingdom, Ireland, Australia, New Zealand, and much of Africa. MPI Original Films projects have featured actors such as Josh Holloway, Hannah John-Kamen, Miriam Silverman, Holland Taylor, Nestor Carbonell, Sofia Bush, Nesta Cooper, Mike Faist, Crystal Reed, and Uzo Aduba.

Festival screenings for MPI Original films have included the Hamptons International Film Festival (Pinball: The Man Who Saved the Game), South by Southwest (the series We’re Doing Good), and the Tribeca Film Festival (A Piece of Cake).

Stories about MPI Original films have been featured in major news outlets such as Miss Virginia in Forbes, Pinball in the The New Yorker, Kemba on CNN’s Laura Coates Live, and One Second After in Esquire.

== Major productions ==
MPI is involved in the production and promotion of the following narrative and documentary films:

Title	Release Date	Synopsis	Notes
One Second After	2027	In a small North Carolina town, a former military officer must protect his family and community after an electromagnetic pulse disables all technology, plunging the world into chaos exposing the fragility of civilization.	MPI Original Film. Scott Rogers attached to direct and J. Michael Straczynski to write.
Motherland	2025	In an alternate society where the government frees parents from the burden of raising children, one woman learns a shocking truth that sparks her rebellion.	MPI Original Film
Kemba	2024	Based on the true story of criminal justice advocate Kemba Smith. In the film, a college student falls in love with a man, only to learn he is a drug kingpin who leads her down a path of abuse and manipulation, placing her in the middle of the government's "war on drugs", and ultimately landing her in federal prison.	BET Original Film and MPI Original Film. Christine Swanson attached to write and direct.
Freedom Hair	2024	Based on thetrue story of Melony Armstrong. In the film, a mother who works at a shelter for battered women decides to start a natural hair braiding business to achieve financial independence for herself and others. To do so she must overcome unexpected obstacles imposed by a powerful cartel and the state of Mississippi.	MPI Original Film
Pinball: The Man Who Saved the Game	2023	A feature-length dramedy based on the true story of Roger Sharpe, the young Midwesterner who overturned New York City's 35 year-old ban on pinball machines.	MPI Original Film
The Perfect One	2020	A young painter revives his family's failing business by taking an innovative risk.	MPI Original Film
A Piece of Cake	2020	A California father turns to illicit means to get dragées for his daughter's birthday cake after discovering that the bite-sized silver confections are banned in the state.	MPI Original Film. It was nominated for Best Narrative Short at Tribeca, won Best Comedy and the Audience Choice Award in Comedy at Indy Shorts, won Best Comedy at the Chesapeake Film Festival, and won Best Short at the New Hope Film Festival where it was also nominated for Best Overall Short and Best Director.
Miss Virginia	October 18, 2019	When an inner-city school erupts in violence, a struggling single mother makes sacrifices to enroll her at-risk son in a safe school where he can learn. Soon her lonely fight for her child's future becomes a monumental battle to change the system itself. Inspired by a true story, Miss Virginia raises big questions about educational opportunity in America.	MPI Original Film
Regulation	2019	In the near future, a young social worker named Mia travels through a small town community to administer behavior-modifying "patches" that guarantee happiness for the wearers. She must decide what to do when Kaleigh, a precocious 10-year-old girl, refuses to accept the patch, and takes Mia on a tour of the imagination that her unregulated feelings bring.	MPI Original Film
The Conqueror	July 26, 2018	Maintenance worker by day, pro-boxer by night, Jerome Conquest lives in the city of Rocky and comes from one of Philadelphia's most dangerous neighborhoods, Strawberry Mansion. When Conquest loses his best friend, Calvin, to street violence, he turns to boxing as a way to improve his life. Despite his struggles, Jerome doesn't see himself as a victim—he works hard, pursuing his dream of becoming a professional boxer and inspiring others with the belief that the same freedom resides in the hearts of all people.	MPI-supported film
Gringa	2018	Vanessa, a Cuban-American woman, has a foot in two worlds. When she rushes home to pack for a trip to Cuba, she doesn't expect what's waiting for her: a mission from her eccentric Abuelo. Based loosely on the filmmakers' real-life experiences, Gringa is a heartfelt take on family, culture, and identity as Vanessa reevaluates what really matters most to her.	MPI Original Film directed by Claudia Murray.
Moving Violation	2018	Moving Violation follows a young woman who is determined to "think positive" after a devastating breakup with her fiancé. But when the newly installed speed camera on her street won't stop surveilling her, it becomes the unwitting lightning rod for Tara's pent-up wrath and positive thinking quickly turns to getting even.	MPI Original Film
Mama Rwanda	2016	Mama Rwanda tells the story of two mothers using entrepreneurship to overcome extreme poverty. Drocella, a village wife, and Christine, a city widow, represent a new generation of women business-owners transforming post-genocide Rwanda into one of the ten fastest growing economies in the world.	MPI-supported film
Corrections	2017	Corrections is a near-future science fiction film about crime and punishment. The setting is a next-generation prison where inmates are tested through simulations that evaluate their moral resolve in their most intimate moments. In this dystopian institution, prisoners aren't rehabilitated; they're corrected.	MPI-supported film
Dreaming Against the World	2014	This haunting documentary short tells the story of Mu Xin, an artist who was imprisoned during China's bloody Cultural Revolution. While in captivity, Mu Xin risked his life to write and paint—work that in turn helped him survive.	MPI-supported film directed by Francisco Bello and Tim Sternberg.
How Jack Became Black	July 2018	By the year 2050, at least 20% of all Americans will self-identify as two or more races. Will this change the future of race relations and identity politics? Filmmaker Eli Steele seeks to answer these questions in How Jack Became Black. This subject is personal for the filmmaker, who was born to a black father and Jewish mother. His children are even more racially diverse, but were denied admission by their local public school for failing to name a "primary race".	MPI-supported film
What We Started	February 23, 2018	What We Started delves into the highly popular world of electronic dance music, providing backdoor access to a widely misunderstood, self-driven, and well-insulated industry. Following the journeys of industry pioneers, like Carl Cox, and today's biggest superstar, Martin Garrix, this feature documentary explores freedom of expression, freedom of association, and the liberatory impact of electronic music around the world.	MPI-supported film directed by Cyrus Saidi.
Incarcerating US	September 8, 2016	The United States has the highest incarceration rate in the world. Over 2 million Americans are currently in prison, many for nonviolent offenses. This staggering fact carries enormous human and economic costs, sparking debates among policy experts and ordinary citizens: When should the state have the authority to take away an individual's freedom? Incarcerating US presents a compelling argument that the criminal justice system needs urgent reform.	MPI-supported film
State of Control	January 1, 2016	State of Control follows two American filmmakers as they travel undercover, documenting Tibetan activists' human rights struggle against the Chinese government's police state. During a full-scale media shut down, a dangerous cat-and-mouse game quickly unfolds—secret police maintain 24-hour surveillance of the filmmakers, leading to hotel break-ins, theft, and cyber-hacking. Working with a team of cyber security experts, the filmmakers realize they are but one small piece of a global cyber crime wave that has impacted the likes of Google, the New York Times, the Washington Post, the Wall Street Journal, a number of Fortune 100 companies, and even the White House.	MPI-supported film
The Immortalists	March 8, 2014	This character-driven documentary follows three scientists who share one goal: to develop medical technologies that will vastly increase life expectancy. Bill Andrews, founder of a biotech company and a 60-year-old ultra-marathoner; Terry Grossman, a top anti-aging physician catering to patients who want to live forever; and Aubrey de Grey, a Cambridge-educated biogerontologist, have dedicated their lives to creating an infinite future for humanity. But is life extension even possible? And if it is, what are the political, ethical, and economic implications of it?	MPI-supported film directed by Jason Sussberg and David Alvarado.
Dog Days	October 26, 2013	Dog Days is a captivating portrait of American entrepreneurship. When Coite Manuel, a first-time entrepreneur, enters the street food business, he enlists the help of two unlikely women: Deane, his harp-playing aunt, and Siyone, an East African hotdog vendor and single mother of four. Coite stakes his meager life savings on a vision to revive Washington, D.C.'s, dwindling street vending community. Along the way, he faces bewildering challenges, including hostile city regulations and an entrenched local monopoly. Even though success doesn't come easily, Coite and Siyone fight to maintain hope in the face of adversity. Dog Days explores themes of immigration, vocation, and the power of perseverance.	MPI-supported film
Honor Flight	August 11, 2012	Honor Flight is a heartwarming documentary about four World War II veterans and a Midwest community coming together to give them the trip of a lifetime. Volunteers race against the clock to fly thousands of these heroes to Washington, D.C., to see the memorials constructed in their honor. The trips are called "Honor Flights" and for the veterans, who are in their late 80s, it's often the first time they've been thanked and the last trip of their lives.	MPI-supported film
L1ttl3 Br0th3r	2012	A political thriller with a sci-fi twist, L1ttl3 Br0th3r follows a fictional Nobel laureate who risks everything to challenge the status quo. Exploring how technology has become a powerful tool for oppressors and freedom fighters alike, the film makes a timely contribution to current debates over state surveillance, technological activism, and government control.	MPI-supported film directed by Cyrus Saidi and Gautam Pinto.
Chosin	September 10, 2010	At the height of the Korean War, 15,000 U.S. troops were trapped and outnumbered 10-to-1. In a harrowing battle, these soldiers fought 78-miles to freedom and saved the lives of 98,000 refugees. After 60 years of silence, the survivors of the Chosin Reservoir Campaign take us on a heart-pounding journey through one of the most savage battles in American history.	MPI-supported film
Battle for Brooklyn	July 9, 2010	Battle for Brooklyn follows the activists who fought to save people's homes and property rights during the development of a professional basketball arena in Brooklyn. Widely known as the Atlantic Yards project, the undertaking was a major source of contention as local residents resisted a developer's attempt to use eminent domain to seize their homes and businesses.	MPI-supported film
Good Fortune	June 2009	Through intimate portraits of three individuals living in the poorest areas of Kenya, Good Fortune explores how massive, international efforts to alleviate poverty in Africa may be undermining the very communities they aim to benefit.	MPI-supported film
2081	May 29, 2009	2081 is a star-studded adaptation of Kurt Vonnegut's short story "Harrison Bergeron". The film is set in a dystopian future where everyone is "equal every which way." In this stifling world, a Handicapper General goes to enormous lengths to punish individualism.	MPI Original Film directed by Chandler Tuttle.
Freedom's Fury	August 25, 2006	Freedom's Fury centers on the 1956 Olympic semifinal water polo match between Hungary and Russia. This so-called "Blood in the Water Match" took place in Melbourne, Australia, weeks after Soviet forces brutally suppressed the 1956 Hungarian Revolution. The film is narrated by Olympic gold medalist Mark Spitz.	MPI-supported film
The Singing Revolution	June 26, 2007	Music was the weapon of choice for Estonians who sought to free themselves from decades of Soviet occupation. Between 1987 and 1991, hundreds of thousands gathered in fields to sing forbidden patriotic songs and rally for independence. The Singing Revolution documents how the Estonian people sang their way to freedom while helping topple an empire.	MPI-supported film
Hammer & Tickle	April 30, 2006	George Orwell observed that, under repressive political regimes, jokes are "tiny revolutions." Hammer & Tickle expands on that statement, showing how jokes enabled people in the Soviet Bloc to defy state authority. In 2006, Lewis's documentary won the Zurich Film Festival's award for "Best New Documentary Film". It has been broadcast by the BBC in Britain and by ARTE in France, and has inspired an accompanying book.	MPI-supported film
