= Scott Ehrlich =

US real estate developer, businessman & filmmaker (b. 1965)

- Ehrlich in 2014
- Born: Scott Michael Ehrlich; Los Angeles, California, U.S.
- Education: University of Arizona
- Occupations: Real estate developer, businessman, filmmaker
- Years active: 1986–present
- Board member of: InSite Development
- Awards: Navigating Change Award (2012)

Scott Ehrlich is an American real estate developer, independent filmmaker, and businessman.

== Early life and education ==
Ehrlich was born in Los Angeles, California. He earned his bachelor's degree from the University of Arizona.

== Career ==
=== Real estate ===
Ehrlich's career in real estate began in 1986 and focused on financing and developing affordable housing projects supported by government funding programs.

Ehrlich's Arbor Artist Lofts in downtown Lancaster, California were completed in August 2009. The Arbor Artist Lofts went on to win the 2010 AIA HUD Secretary's Housing and Community Design Award.

In 2010, Ehrlich began the Lancaster Boulevard project with the intent to transform the boulevard from a four-lane, automobile-dominated thoroughfare into a pedestrian-friendly boulevard. In the same year, he founded the BeX Bar & Grill in Lancaster, which has since closed.

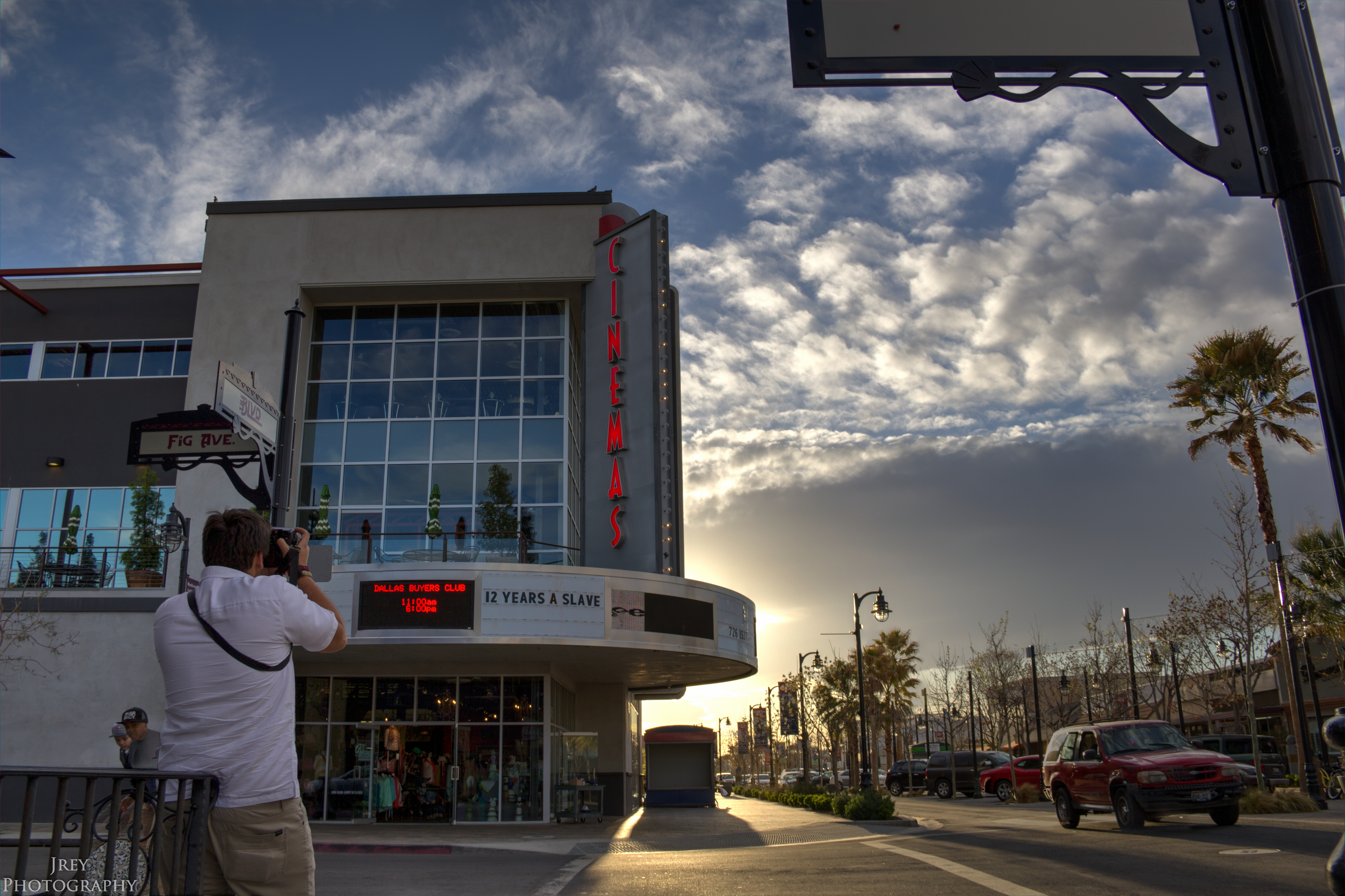
The Laemmle BLVD Cinema

In 2011, Ehrlich developed The Laemmle BLVD Cinemas, a luxury cinema in the Antelope Valley area. It opened to the public on August 14, 2011. Ehrlich later helped with the development of The BLVD's Renaissance Center. In 2011, The BLVD won the APA Planning Excellence in Implementation Award of Merit, In 2012, the National Award for Smart Growth Achievement, the 2012 California Redevelopment Association Award of Excellence, the 2012 California Downtown Association Award, the 2013 International Downtown Association Pinnacle Award, and the 2014 San Fernando Valley Business Journal's Commercial Real Estate Awards.

Ehrlich would go on to develop the Kinetic Brewing Company in Lancaster, which has since closed. The brewery won two bronze medals at the Great American Beer Festival in 2013.

In 2012, Ehrlich's InSite Development in Lancaster, with assistance from the city's Commercial Property Improvement Program (CPIP), established the eatery 1800 Restaurant on The BLVD. In the same year, Ehrlich renovated the "Woolworth Building" into an 8,000-square-foot (743.22 m^{2}), two-story complex on the BLVD. Later in 2012, InSite Development constructed a museum of art history (MOAH) for the city.

=== Filmmaking ===
Ehrlich co-authored an original musical stage play, Pearly Gates: the Musical, with Penny Orloff. The stage play raised approximately $20,000 from four performances. In 2015, Ehrlich released an independent film of the same name, the cast of which includes Scott Grimes, Uzo Aduba, and Lainie Kazan. Sheri Linden of The Hollywood Reporter described it as "an ostensible comedy" with "banal observations about what it means to be remembered."

== Awards and honours ==
In September 2010, the Lancaster City Council considered a proposal to rename a portion of Elm Ave as "Ehrlich Avenue" to honor Ehrlich's development of the downtown. Then-mayor, R. Rex Parris, commented: "We are privileged to recognize [Ehrlich] for his truly extraordinary work."

- Antelope Valley Board of Trade – Navigating Change Award 2012
