= Shorty McShorts' Shorts =

2006 American TV series

- Genre: Anthology; Comedy
- Created by: Barry Blumberg; John Solomon
- Starring: Various
- Composer: Various
- Country of origin: United States
- Original language: English
- No. of seasons: 2
- No. of episodes: 13

Production
- Running time: 4–5 minutes
- Production company: Walt Disney Television Animation

Original release
- Network: Disney Channel
- Release: July 28, 2006 – May 25, 2007

Shorty McShorts' Shorts is an American animated anthology short series, which consisted of 4-5-minute shorts. It aired from July 28, 2006, to May 25, 2007.

== Summary ==
The series was initially conceived as a shorts/pilot program for Disney Television Animation (making this show, to date their only anthology/shorts program), produced by John Solomon and Carolyn Suzuki. The host of the show is Shorty McShorts. His name is often shortened to "Shorty" or "SMS", which appears on the hat that he wears. He is also the train conductor for his own Short Line. He appeared in advertisements for the show and the introduction, and conclusion of each short, but never appears in any short.

The show takes the form of a Saturday-morning cartoon, as the shorts that are shown could very well be installments of their own mini-series. The Boyz on Da Run shorts appear in a certain order and have three episodes attached as a miniseries, with a fourth one that never appeared on TV. The other episodes do belong to their own miniseries, but the way the shorts are set up suggests that more installments under the same name could be produced.

The series finale, "Flip-Flopped", was scored by Robert Schneider of The Apples in Stereo.

== Broadcast history ==
The series mainly received mixed reviews. Episodes premiered week after week until the 6th episode. The third part of the Boyz on Da Run miniseries was the last episode of Season 1, having aired on September 29, 2006.

The show went into hiatus until April 2007. During the meantime, another short series, Minuscule, filled in as a substitute for Shorty McShorts' Shorts during its hiatus. The second season was on air for only a limited time, as it aired new episodes only for one month straight (April 20, 2007 – May 25, 2007).

Shorty McShorts' Shorts was last shown in May 2007, before being completely cancelled. Reruns were rarely shown and were used mainly as time slot fillers until they stopped airing altogether. Although approximately 25 shorts were produced, only 13 were aired with the remaining 12 shorts being aired in other territories and/or leaked online.

The unaired short Fish Tale would later be reworked into Fish Hooks in 2010, while the short SheZow!, which marked the show's 10th episode, was later revived as a TV series on Hub Network.

== Series overview ==
| Season | Episodes | Originally aired | |
| Season | Episodes | First aired | Last aired |
|---|---|---|---|
| 1 | 7 | July 28, 2006 | September 29, 2006 |
| 2 | 6 | April 20, 2007 | May 25, 2007 |

== Episodes ==
=== Season 1 (2006) ===
| No. in series | No. in season | Title | Created by | First aired | Plot |
|---|---|---|---|---|---|
| 1 | 1 | "Dudley and Nestor Do Nothing" | Stephen Holman and Josephine T. Huang | July 28, 2006 | Dudley (voiced by Richard Steven Horvitz) and Nestor (voiced by Wilmer Valderrama) go on a field trip to a space center and accidentally launch into space on their way to the bathroom, which leads to them indirectly saving the world from an oncoming asteroid that would've collided with Earth. Also starring Zach Ewing, Howard Hoffman, Tom Kenny, and Dionne Quan. |
| 2 | 2 | "My Mom Married a Yeti" | Dennis Messner | August 4, 2006 | April and Izzy (voiced by Lara Jill Miller and Tara Strong), the children of a scientist (voiced by Lauren Martin) who married a Yeti named Og (voiced by Jim Gaffigan), fear their parents embarrassing them at a school dance. They both end up with popular kids, but things take a turn for the worse when Og goes berserk and climbs onto the roof of the school, in an attempt to "protect" his children from "predators." Also starring Tom Kenny. |
| 3 | 3 | "Bozzlebags' Zip" | David P. Smith (credited as Dave Smith) | August 11, 2006 | After his father Fred Mailman (voiced by Tom Kenny) changes jobs and becomes the mailman for children's show host Admiral Bozzelbags (voiced by Kevin Michael Richardson), a disgruntled 12-year-old boy named Collin (voiced by Axel Alba) and his family, including his mother (voiced by Lisa Tamashiro), and sister (voiced by Lexi Jourdan) move to Bozzlebags' Zip, much to Colin's frustration once they arrive. Though Admiral Bozzlebags and his parrot Doug (voiced by David P. Smith) help set Collin straight. |
| 4 | 4 | "The Phabulizers" | Van Partible | August 18, 2006 | Okie-Dokee (voiced by Kari Wahlgren), Boomer (voiced by Derek Stephen Prince), Jimbob (voiced by John DiMaggio), and Hunky-D the Beaver (voiced by John Schneider) are members of a group that makes people fabulous with one of their targets being a dorky kid (voiced by Greg Cipes). |
| 5 | 5 | "Boyz on Da Run" | Rob Reger and Brian Brooks | August 25, 2006 (Part 1) | Donny (voiced by Scott Menville), Frankie (voiced by Jeff Bennett), Ricky (voiced by Joey Fatone), Skylar (voiced by Mikey Kelley), and Cameron (voiced by Wayne Brady) are members of a hit boy band called Da Boys From Yo Cul-De-Sac. They are ordered to do some lip synching during their upcoming concert by their manager Stu, who interrupts the wisdom of their wise choreographer Cory (voiced by James Sie). When it all goes wrong, they have to go into hiding. Also starring Maria Bamford, Grey DeLisle, Tom Kenny, Kent Osborne, and Henry Rollins. |
| 6 | 6 | "Boyz on Da Run" | Rob Reger and Brian Brooks | September 8, 2006 (Part 2) | After being thrown off the train they escaped on for not being hobos, the boys run into a little diner and decide that they will work there in order to get food. They pull it all off when Cory speaks to them through floating pickles, forming the shape of his head. Also starring Maria Bamford, Grey DeLisle, Tom Kenny, Kent Osborne, and Henry Rollins. |
| 7 | 7 | "Boyz on Da Run" | Rob Reger and Brian Brooks | September 29, 2006 (Part 3) | The boys run into Canada where their pursuers are unable to follow them. They make use of garbage to disguise themselves, are welcomed by the mounties, and get thrown in prison when the Canadian leaf is disrespected by Ricky. With wisdom from Cory in the form of a rat, they get out with help from a lumberjack prisoner (voiced by Tom Kenny) that is a fan of them. Also starring Maria Bamford, Grey DeLisle, Kent Osborne, and Henry Rollins. |

=== Season 2 (2007) ===
| No. in series | No. in season | Title | Created by | First aired | Plot |
|---|---|---|---|---|---|
| 8 | 1 | "Too Many Robots!" | Attaboy | April 20, 2007 | Digit (voiced by Kelly Stables) is a sweet country girl who earned a scholarship to study in a city school and has been sent to live with her mad scientist uncle (voiced by Brian Stepanek), his wife (voiced by Iris Bahr), and his robot inventions. She isn't very happy about this, especially after a pair of self-dancing robotic shoes ruin her school dance. After a transforming robot (voiced by Brian Stepanek) turns into a DJ and she dances with her crush Matt (voiced by Greg Cipes), she starts to warm up to them a bit. Also starring Thomas Pistore and Shane R. Robinson. |
| 9 | 2 | "Troy Ride" | Brumby Boylston and Bucky Fukumoto | April 27, 2007 | Three tiny aliens named Monte Cosmo (voiced by Carlos Alazraqui), Shapiro (voiced by Sean Marquette), and Duley (voiced by Brumby Boylston) from space have crashed on earth. Their spaceship is destroyed, so they create a robot boy to try to get to a space station. Unfortunately, they are forced to attend school by Truant Officer Fabian (voiced by Kurtwood Smith) because they built Troy to resemble a short kid. They try to get moon shoes from a comic book so they can get back home with help from their friend (voiced by Pamela Adlon), but run into trouble with a school bully (voiced by Kent Osborne), the principal, Truant Officer Fabian, and a broken "nerve" (a rope). |
| 10 | 3 | "SheZow!" | Obie Scott Wade | May 4, 2007 | Guy (voiced by Jason Earles) becomes a superhero when he puts on his Aunt Agnes' magic ring. He then turns into a female superhero named SheZow, much to the amusement of his sister Kelly (voiced by Emily Osment). To make matters worse, by putting on the ring he has chosen to be SheZow, and it cannot be removed. As SheZow, he saves his friend Jose (voiced by Marcus Toji) from bullies, though Jose develops a crush on his female form. Also starring Tyler Posey and Obie Scott Wade. |
| 11 | 4 | "Mascot Prep" | Chip Wass | May 11, 2007 | A freshman named Kevin (voiced by Mitchel Musso) tries to fit in at a school of mascots run by Mr. Hoffenfoffer (voiced by John DiMaggio) and find his jingle. He starts to befriend a blob-like student named Germ (voiced by Jordan David) and put up with the insults from two skunks (voiced by Emily Osment and Grey DeLisle). Also starring Cindy Williams. |
| 12 | 5 | "The Imperfect Duplicates of Dodger Dare" | Andy Suriano | May 18, 2007 | Dodger Dare (voiced by Andy Suriano) finds a photocopier that makes duplicates of him. However, the duplicates are imperfect in some way and can be destroyed by water. Unaware that his best friend Beauty (voiced by Lisa Loeb) has a crush on him, he clones himself so he doesn't have to talk to his date Amber Van Owen (voiced by Sherrie Jackson). |
| 13 | 6 | "Flip-Flopped" | Jill Mazursky | May 25, 2007 | Set in a world where humans age backwards, child parents Andy (voiced by Cameron Monaghan) and Taffy (voiced by Ariel Winter) try to leave their adult children Duke (voiced by Jeff Garlin) and Danielle (voiced by Amy Yasbeck) home alone for a night. However, paranoia between the children about robbers and adults about the house being destroyed leads to Duke calling the police, and Taffy knocking out her husband after mistaking him for an intruder. Series Finale |

=== Unreleased (2006-2007) ===
| Title | Created by | Unofficial release date | Plot |
|---|---|---|---|
| Catch One Up! | Gabe Swarr and Ricky Garduno | February 2, 2013 | A boy named Scoops (voiced by Carlos Alazraqui) tries to stand up for his little sister Tina (voiced by Tara Strong) who is constantly being bullied by their neighbor Shep (voiced by Tom Kenny) for an ice cream machine. Later that night, their mischievous video game companion, One Up, keeps stealing toys from Shep's house and it's up to Scoops and Tina to return the toys back before Shep wakes up. |
| Fish Tale | Noah Z. Jones | N/A | The plot for this pilot is unknown as it is believed lost, but it does feature the voices of Kyle Massey, Chelsea Kane, Noah Z. Jones and Alex Hirsch. The pilot would later be reworked into Fish Hooks, which premiered in 2010. |
| Horace & Boris in Got Your Nose! | Brandon Ragnar Johnson | March 12, 2025 | Boris (voiced by Richard Steven Horvitz) takes the nose of his brother Horace (voiced by Dee Bradley Baker) and takes it around town to torture it. Also starring Alan Oppenheimer. |
| Grungy McGee | Anna Chambers | July 20, 2014 _{(Dutch)} | A three-eyed monster named Grungy gets invited to a party, but then runs into trouble with some bees after he destroys their hive, so he tries to find a new home for them. Starring the voices of Lacey Chabert, Anna Chambers, Charlie Schlatter and Richard Tatum. |
| Intergredients | Roque Ballesteros, Alan Lau and Brad Rau | July 20, 2014 _{(Dutch)} | Taking place in a futuristic setting, a brother and sister enter a contest to find a peanut for a chef. Starring the voices of Mae Whitman, Bobby Lee, Matt Kaminsky and Roger L. Jackson. |
| Bad Hair Daze | Noel Tolentino | November 19, 2010 | A love triangle happens between Kathy (voiced by Selena Gomez), Dustin (voiced by Jason Dolley), Moose (voiced by Scott Menville) and Ivy (voiced by Mae Whitman). |
| Knights of Now | Rex Crowle | N/A | |
| Sunny County | N/A | N/A | |
| Hiding Hiccups | Darin McGowan | N/A | |
| Deer Mike | Obie Scott Wade | October 16, 2009 | An inflatable deer named Mike (voiced by Jason Earles) moves into the forest to become a real deer, accompanied by his best friend, a porcupine named Harry (voiced by Jorge Garcia). Mike then runs into trouble with a buck named Jab (voiced by John DiMaggio) after he catches Mike talking to his girlfriend Trillaquent (voiced by Melissa Disney). Also starring Jeff Bennett. |
| Lumber Jacksons | Ricardo Curtis | February 6, 2025 | A family consisting of a father (voiced by Wayne Brady), a brother (also voiced by Brady) and a sister (voiced by Masasa Moyo) move from Detroit to a snowy rural city in Canada. The sister doesn't like the changes at first, until her family and the townsfolk throw her a Detroit-styled party to make her feel welcome. Also starring James Sie. |
| Little Man Dan With a Big Fat Hand | Mitch Schauer and Richard Steven Horvitz | February 5, 2025 | Born with a gigantic hand that has a mind of its own connected to a long arm that stretches to infinity, a middle school student named Dan Littleman (voiced by Richard Steven Horvitz) is invited to a prom, but the hand wants to tag along, much to Dan's dismay. So, the hand disguises as a cheerleader to get into the prom, since cheerleaders get in free. Also starring Lauren Tom, James Arnold Taylor and Vicki Lewis. |

== See also ==
- What a Cartoon! (Cartoon Network)
- Oh Yeah! Cartoons (Nickelodeon)
- KaBlam! (Nickelodeon)
- Random! Cartoons (Nicktoons)
- The Cartoonstitute (Cartoon Network Video)
- Liquid Television (MTV)
- Raw Toonage (CBS)
- Wedgies (Cartoon Network)
- DC Nation Shorts (Cartoon Network)
