= Incarcerating US =

- Directed by: Regan Hines
- Produced by: Vincent Vittorio
- Starring: Neill Franklin, Julie Stewart, Eric Sterling, Tim Lynch, Richard Wener, Marc Mauer
- Cinematography: Jonathan Baudoin
- Edited by: Asher Emmanuel
- Music by: Brandon Hickey
- Distributed by: Life is My Movie Entertainment
- Release date: September 8, 2016
- Running time: 84 minutes
- Country: United States
- Language: English

Incarcerating US is a 2016 documentary film produced by Life Is My Movie Entertainment. The film explores the history of the prison system in the United States and the ramifications of mass incarceration.

== Synopsis ==
Incarcerating US examines the current state of U.S. prisons and the policies that lead to unprecedented over-incarceration. Incarcerating US focuses on two major initiatives; the war on drugs and mandatory minimum sentences. The film presents interviews from current and former inmates, lawyers, lawmakers, and family members to argue that these initiatives failed. Notable consultants interviewed in the film include: Neill Franklin, Julie Stewart, Eric Sterling, Tim Lynch, Richard Wener and Marc Mauer.

Incarcerating Us was officially released on September 8, 2016, with the world premier in Washington D.C. followed by a panel discussion.

== See also ==
- Mass incarceration
- Prison reform
- Drugs in the United States
- Innocence Project
