= Pinball: The Man Who Saved the Game =

2022 biographical film

- Directed by: Austin Bragg; Meredith Bragg
- Written by: Austin Bragg; Meredith Bragg
- Produced by: Rob Pfaltzgraff; Lana Link; Stacey Park; Summer Crockett Moore; Tony Glazer
- Starring: Mike Faist; Crystal Reed; Dennis Boutsikaris
- Cinematography: Jon Keng
- Edited by: Michelle Botticelli
- Music by: Rob Barbato
- Production company: MPI Original Films
- Distributed by: MPI Original Films
- Release dates: October 8, 2022 (Hamptons); March 17, 2023 (United States)
- Running time: 95 minutes
- Country: United States
- Language: English

Pinball: The Man Who Saved the Game is a 2022 biographical comedy drama film directed and written by the Bragg brothers. The film stars Mike Faist, Crystal Reed, and Dennis Boutsikaris. It is based on true events around the story of Roger Sharpe, GQ journalist and real-life "pinball wizard" who in 1976 helped overturn New York City's 35-year ban on pinball.

Pinball: The Man Who Saved the Game made its world premiere at the 2022 Hamptons International Film Festival. It was released in select theaters and VOD on March 17, 2023. The film received generally positive reviews from critics.

== Plot ==
The film begins with an interview of the older Roger Sharpe, with flashbacks to 1971.

While a college student in Wisconsin, Roger Sharpe becomes a pinball wizard, a master of the game. He moves to New York City where he hopes to become a writer, and it's there that he has a chance encounter with a woman named Ellen, whom he eventually marries. Sharpe lands a job at GQ Magazine where he writes an article about the game of pinball. At the same time, Sharpe is shocked to discover that pinball has been banned in NYC for 35 years, as well as in many other major cities across the USA, because pinball machines were labeled as a form of gambling.

Sharpe's pinball article in GQ brings him to the attention of the Music and Amusement Association (MAA), an organization that oversees coin operated games in NYC. The MAA has been trying to get the ruling on pinball overturned for some time, and they approach Sharpe, asking for his help. He, however, turns them down because he is spending all of his time and energy on writing a book about pinball.

During this project, Roger writes and Ellen types the handwritten manuscript, and their relationship grows.

As part of his research, Sharpe travels across the country and meets with people who were instrumental in the development and popularization of pinball. Sharpe then agrees to help the MAA.

The head of the MAA and its legal team convince Sharpe to testify at a NYC City Council meeting where Sharpe will play pinball in an attempt to show the council that pinball is not a game of chance, but that it is, instead, a game of skill. His testimony and demonstration sways the council, and the ban is overturned.

When the narrator asks Sharpe if that game in front of the city council, and one shot in particular, was the greatest shot he ever took, Sharpe chuckles and tells them that it wasn't. His greatest shot comes when he asks Ellen's son for his permission to ask his mom to marry him.

== Cast ==
- Mike Faist as Roger Sharpe
- Dennis Boutsikaris as Mr. Sharpe
- Crystal Reed as Ellen
- Christopher Convery as Seth
- Mike Doyle as Jack Haber
- Damian Young as Ben Chikofsky
- Bryan Batt as Harry Coulianos
- Connor Ratliff as Jimmy
- Olivia Koukol as Judy
- Todd Susman as Sam Gensberg
- Kenneth Tigar as Irving Holzman
- Toby Regbo as James Hamilton
- Supriya Ganesh as Pamela
- Alexandre Bagot as The Guy
- Michael Kostroff as Chairman Warner

== Production ==
Initially conceived as a short documentary, after talking to Roger Sharpe in early 2020 Meredith Bragg decided it might be a film. Development of the script used information obtained from Sharpe over days of Zoom calls. Much of the footage of pinball playfields was recorded on the final day of shooting, with Sharpe playing the machines.

The film is the directorial debut of the Bragg brothers.

== Reception ==
On the review aggregator website Rotten Tomatoes, the film has a rating of 94% based on 17 reviews, with an average rating of 7.2/10. Metacritic, which uses a weighted average, assigned the film a score of 64 out of 100, based on four critics, indicating "generally favorable reviews".

The film won the Audience Award for Best Narrative Film at the Three Rivers Film Festival, the Overall Audience Choice Award and the Indiana Film Journalists Association Directorial Debut Award at the Heartland International Film Festival, and the Best Narrative Feature Award at the Savannah College of Art and Design Savannah Film Festival.
