= Miss Virginia (film) =

- Directed by: R.J. Daniel Hanna
- Written by: Erin O'Connor
- Produced by: Maurice Black; M. Elizabeth Hughes; Erin O'Connor; Stacey Parks; Rob Pfaltzgraff
- Starring: Uzo Aduba; Matthew Modine; Niles Fitch; Amirah Vann; Adina Porter; Aunjanue Ellis; Vanessa Williams
- Cinematography: Nancy Schreiber
- Edited by: Brian Scofield
- Music by: Laura Karpman
- Production company: Moving Picture Institute
- Distributed by: Vertical Entertainment
- Release date: October 18, 2019

Miss Virginia is a 2019 American drama film directed by R.J. Daniel Hanna and starring Uzo Aduba in a title role as a struggling inner-city mother who sacrifices everything to give her son a good education. Supporting cast include Matthew Modine, Niles Fitch, Amirah Vann, Adina Porter, Aunjanue Ellis, and Vanessa Williams. The film is based on a true story.

The film was released on October 18, 2019, by Vertical Entertainment.

== Cast ==
- Uzo Aduba as Virginia Walden
- Matthew Modine as Congressman Cliff Williams
- Niles Fitch as James Walden
- Amirah Vann as Shondae Smith
- Adina Porter as Annette Johnson
- Aunjanue Ellis as Congresswoman Lorraine Townsend
- Vanessa Williams as Sally Rae
- Samantha Sloyan as Mrs. Watson
- Kimberly Hébert Gregory as Tasha White
- Erik LaRay Harvey as Mayor Anthony Carver

== Production ==
Production began in November 2017, when Uzo Aduba was cast in a leading role. In April 2018, Matthew Modine, Aunjanue Ellis, Vanessa Williams and Kimberly Hébert Gregory joined the cast and filming began later that month in Los Angeles.

Miss Virginia was the first narrative production of the Moving Picture Institute, and one of several MPI films that push for school choice programs. MPI has received support from school choice supporter and Republican political donor Rebekah Mercer, who was also previously on its board.

== Reception ==
On review aggregator website Rotten Tomatoes, the film holds an approval rating of 50% based on 14 reviews.
