= Magicampers =

Animated preschool series

- Created by: Obie Scott Wade
- Directed by: Daniel Dubuis
- Starring: Cassie Glow; Benjamin Mackey; Mason Blomberg; Carlos Solórzano; Araceli Prasarttongosoth; Uzo Aduba
- Opening theme: "We're the Magicampers"
- Ending theme: Magicamper Marching Song
- Composer: Christophe Henrotte
- Country of origin: United States
- Original language: English
- No. of seasons: 1
- No. of episodes: 22

Production
- Executive producers: Ashley Mendoza; Sandrine Nguyen Tiet; Obie Scott Wade
- Production company: ObieCo (Note: Animation outsourced to Mikros Animation.)

Original release
- Network: Disney Jr.
- Release: March 23, 2026 – present

Magicampers is an American animated children's television series created by Obie Scott Wade. It premiered on Disney Jr. on March 23, 2026. The series was renewed for a second season in August 2026.

== Premise ==
Darly, a flying pig; and Loomis, a unicorn horned donkey are best friends who are attending a fantastical day camp on Magicamp Island that is filled with various other animals who are hybrids of mythical beings.

== Characters ==
=== Main ===
- Darly (voiced by Cassie Glow) is a "pig-asus"; a pig-Pegasus hybrid with the ability to fly. She sometimes has a rivalry with Dracoon that results in them butting heads a lot. She is Loomis' best friend.
- Loomis (voiced by Benjamin Mackey) is a "donkeycorn"; a unicorn horned donkey hybrid who performs magic via rhyming. However, he is hesitant to use his magic, which usually does not work right. He is Darly's best friend.
- Dracoon (voiced by Mason Blomberg) is a green raccoon with dragon-like features such as red wings, scales, and fangs. Like Darly, he can fly, but can also breathe fire which is green. He has an arrogant streak, seeing himself as the best of the campers, but will usually admit when he's done wrong, and has a fear of the dark.
- Bodhi (voiced by Carlos Solórzano) is a "skunktaur"; a skunk with the horns and lower half of a bull. He has superhuman strength, and can shoot out colorful clouds from his backside which can rocket him from one location to another.
- Fifi (voiced by Araceli Prasarttongosoth) is a white dog with flaming hair. Her magic ability is teleportation, which triggers whenever she's experiencing strong emotions or is stressed.
- Treena (voiced by Uzo Aduba) is a nature spirit and the camp's leader who resembles an anthropomorphic tree with a deer-like face. She presents and mentors the Magicampers on their many adventures. She is also able to generate a magical Book of Legends.

=== Recurring ===
- Chiffen (voiced by Bryan Chao) is a little chicken with a griffin's body and wings. He is able to shout out powerful sound waves. He also happens to be the youngest of the campers.
- Harper (voiced by Celestina Harris) is a cat with a mermaid's tail. She plays a harp that can create a variety of spells. Although she can swim gracefully, Harper uses a wheeled clamshell to move on land.
- Chauncey (voiced by Truman Eoff) is a large jackalope/centaur-like creature called a Bunnytaur and one of the many mentors. He plays a flute which is mostly used to levitate things.
- Merritt (voiced by Kelly Baskin) is part Lamia-part cat and another mentor who is Harper's older sister. Her duty is making and stating the rules of the camp.
- Critters (voiced by Daniel Ross and Shelby Young) are various assorted mythical beings on Magicamp Island.

== Episodes ==
All episodes are directed by Daniel Dubuis.

No.	Title	Written by	Original release date	Prod. code
1	"Enchanted Gardening"	Ashley Mendoza	March 23, 2026	104
1	"Gem Scouting"	Ashley Mendoza & Elizabeth Schub Kamir	March 23, 2026	104
Enchanted Gardening: When Dracoon eggs Loomis into using his magic on a seed, the campers struggle to stop a babaya berry bush from growing. Gem Scouting: The campers are tasked with finding a series of gems across the island, and Darly, Loomis, and Dracoon find the rare Gem of Power, but have trouble keeping it when they learn it can enhance magic powers.
2	"A Different Kind of Cloud"	Mike Kubat	March 23, 2026	101
2	"Magi-Sneezies"	Mike Kubat	March 23, 2026	101
A Different Kind of Cloud: The Magicampers are searching for special cloud shapes when Darly and Dracoon come across a dog-shaped one they believe is mean, while Loomis is unsure. Magi-Sneezies: Loomis catches a case of the Magi-Sneezies after sniffing some Casanoozle Cabbage, and he throws the campers magic out of whack, forcing Dracoon and Darly to partner up to find a cure.
3	"King Loomis"	Liam Farrell	March 23, 2026	106
3	"Double Dracoon"	Davey Moore	March 23, 2026	106
King Loomis: Loomis gets mistaken for a group of Froglins' lost king when an accident during a mural painting makes him green. Double Dracoon: Dracoon accidentally makes a second him when he breaks the Gem of Power, and uses this to cheat at a camp quest involving the campers finding flags across the island. However, when his double gets trapped, he must admit his deception to get help from the others.
4	"Flight of the Chiffen"	Mike Kubat	March 23, 2026	103
4	"Harper's Power"	Liam Farrell	March 23, 2026	103
Flight of the Chiffen: Loomis makes friends with Chiffen, unintentionally ignoring Darly when the campers are supposed to be making kites. Harper's Power: A new camper named Harper is sent on a quest to discover her magic power, aided by Loomis, Darly, and a special family harp.
5	"Snomes Galore"	Ashley Mendoza & Baljeet Rai	March 23, 2026	105
5	"Tricky Tune"	Simon Nicholson	March 23, 2026	105
Snomes Galore: Darly gets nervous when a bunch of Snomes start popping up around camp as the campers are tasked with planting special seeds. Tricky Tune: Due to Darly's advice, Harper quits trying to master her family's magic harp for an upcoming concert, but it starts making things around the camp fly.
6	"Darly's Messy Magical Map"	Story by : Jorjeana Marie; Written by : Ashley Mendoza	March 23, 2026	102
6	"Pixsqueaks"	Ashley Mendoza & Elizabeth Schub Kamir	March 23, 2026	102
Darly's Messy Magical Map: A blast from Loomis' horn hits Darly's map, leading to the two going on a treasure hunt. Pixsqueaks: A gang of Pixsqueaks disrupt the Magicampers' spring picnic after Darly opens a box of Candy Dandelions Chauncey was saving for a special dish.
7	"Bake Off and Away"	Liam Farrell	April 17, 2026	TBA
7	"Fierce or Fabulous"	Ashley Mendoza & Elizabeth Schub Kamir	April 17, 2026	TBA
Bake Off and Away: Loomis insists on doing everything himself to impress Chauncey when the campers participate in a bake off, but an accident involving a special ingredient makes him realize it’s better to ask for help when necessary. Fierce or Fabulous: Fifi and Dracoon argue about how to decorate the campers new racing car, and the latter unintentionally upsets the former. Meanwhile, the Pixsqueaks are also arguing about what to plant in the campers' garden.
8	"How Dracoon Lost His Fire"	Ashley Mendoza & Mike Kubat	April 24, 2026	TBA
8	"Rules Out"	Liam Farrell	April 24, 2026	TBA
How Dracoon Lost His Fire: A blast of magic from Loomis replaces Dracoon's fire breath with bubbles as the campers partake in a race towards the top of Melody Mountain, but Dracoon quickly discovers his new power has its own advantages. Rules Out: Darly and Loomis complain about the camp's rules when setting up a campfire, leading to Chiffen and Harper hiding the rule book in the woods, and they all chase a duo of Chipachauns to get it back before Merritt gets in trouble.
9	"Bodhi Rocks"	Davey Moore	May 1, 2026	TBA
9	"Pixsqueak Ball"	Simon Nicholson	May 1, 2026	TBA
Bodhi Rocks: On Favorites Day, Bodhi shows Loomis, Darly, and Fifi his love and knowledge of rocks, but gets in over his head when they find the Rock Garden and unintentionally awaken the Rock Guardian. Pixsqueak Ball: Darly and Loomis join the Pixsqueaks in a game of Pixsqueak Ball, but the former is struggling to understand the rules, which leads to them getting trapped in the Pixsqueaks Kingdom.
10	"Mystery in Magicamp"	Mike Kubat	May 8, 2026	TBA
10	"Pixsqueaky Clean"	Story by : Raffaella Della Donne; Written by : Liam Farrell	May 8, 2026	TBA
Mystery in Magicamp: When things go missing at camp, Darly searches for a suspect and ends up accusing her friends trying to solve the mystery, and it’s up to Loomis to find the culprit as well as soothe the hurt feelings among the campers. Pixsqueaky Clean: Darly, Loomis, and Dracoon try to speed up their cleaning of the camp for a singalong, but Loomis ends up attracting the Pixsqueaks instead.
11	"Babaya Berry Blizzard"	Liam Farrell	May 15, 2026	TBA
11	"Hats Off to Fifi"	Ciaran Murtagh & Andrew Jones	May 15, 2026	TBA
Babaya Berry Blizzard: When Loomis uses his magic to pick a bush full of Babaya Berries for a picnic, it flies into a magi-storm cloud and it starts storming over the camp. Hats Off to Fifi: Facing pressure to impress her friends in the upcoming talent show, Fifi finds a Wishing Hat to try and improve her act, but it keeps growing every time she says "fabulous", and ends up interfering with the other campers’ rehearsals.
12	"Chick and Chiffen"	Mike Kubat	May 22, 2026	TBA
12	"All For Little Gruffypants"	Elizabeth Schub Kamir & Josh Haber	May 22, 2026	TBA
Chick and Chiffen: Chiffen finds a Chirpacabra egg that soon hatches while trying to find something special for Circle Time, and ends up having to rescue Darly and Loomis from the distraught mother. All For Little Gruffypants: Dracoon causes trouble for the Magicampers when they hike to see a Butterflairy rainbow by bringing his stuffed toy Little Gruffypants on the trip, as he is so focused on protecting his doll that he ignores the others’ wellbeing.
13	"Truffaloves"	Mike Kubat	May 29, 2026	TBA
13	"The Donkeycorn Prince"	Simon Nicholson	May 29, 2026	TBA
Truffaloves: Darly gets the campers lost on a quest for Dazzleberries when she gets distracted by her favorite food, and when the others get trapped by a herd of Bansheep, Darly must sacrifice the treat to save her friends. The Donkeycorn Prince: Loomis makes Fifi go on a wild goose chase when his stage fright leads him to use his magic to get out of being the lead role in her play. However, when Fifi gets stuck on a cliff, Loomis uses his magic to save her and learns it’s best to tell your friends when you don’t like the choices they make for you.
14	"The Trollamander and the Purple Pumpkins"	Simon Nicholson	June 5, 2026	TBA
14	"Critter Spotting"	Simon Nicholson	June 5, 2026	TBA
The Trollamander and the Purple Pumpkins: On Halloween, Dracoon scares Darly and Loomis when they search for purple pumpkins to carve, only to run into the fabled Trollamander itself. Critter Spotting: Darly grows impatient when she and Loomis try drawing a Hydra-Fox for Circle Time, and keeps scaring it away.
15	"Follow That Froglin"	Ashley Mendoza & Mike Kubat	June 12, 2026	TBA
15	"Go With the Slow"	Written by : Raffaella Delle Donne; Story by : Ciaran Murtagh & Andrew Barnett Jones	June 12, 2026	TBA
Follow That Froglin: When Loomis’ magic attempt to make apples appear goes up in smoke, Bodhi flies away in the commotion, and a Froglin shows up, leading the others to believe that their skunkataur buddy has been morphed into the green critter. This leads to the campers chasing the Froglin all over the camp while the real Bodhi takes on the quest of finding and collecting colored minerals. Go With the Slow: Loomis, Darly, Dracoon, and Fifi gather their go-karts on top of Melody Mountain for a downhill ride where they could see numerous sights, but decide that a race would be more fun.
16	"The Little Magicool Pool"	David Witt	June 19, 2026	TBA
16	"Darly's Extra Wowzy Surprise"	Elizabeth Schub Kamir	June 19, 2026	TBA
The Little Magicool Pool: The usually no-nonsense Merritt suddenly develops a cutesy childish personality after tripping into an enchanted water pit while showing the Magicampers around, and Harper learns the hard way that being the older sister is harder than it looks. Darly's Extra Wowzy Surprise: Darly and her friends try to throw Loomis an ornate surprise birthday party, but when Darly goes overboard in her party planning, she starts disregarding the potential problems with her ideas.
17	"Zippity Snap"	Mike Kubat	June 26, 2026	TBA
17	"Chiffen Tells a Tale"	Jessica Kedward & Kirsty Peart	June 26, 2026	TBA
Zippity Snap: Dracoon gains Loomis’ magic when the latter magically messes up, but loses his own as a consequence, and Loomis must show him how to use the magic properly. Chiffen Tells a Tale: Chiffen pretends he can understand critters' speech like Loomis so that other Magicampers would see him as super-duper, but he ends up accidentally causing panic throughout the camp.
18	"My Friend Cloudimus"	Story by : Simon Nicholson; Written by : Davey Moore	July 3, 2026	TBA
18	"The Magicamp Treasure Hunt"	Liam Farrell	July 3, 2026	TBA
My Friend Cloudimus: When Loomis and Fifi both conceive a game as part of their camp activity, they vie for Cloudimus’ playmate. When the Bansheep abduct Cloudimus to play with him themselves, Loomis and Fifi must work together to rescue him. The Magicamp Treasure Hunt: When the campers partake in a treasure hunt, Dracoon puts the idea in Chiffen's head that they should do things on their own, leading to problems.
19	"A Sandy Situation"	Jim Nolan	July 10, 2026	TBA
19	"Big Bubble Trouble"	Davey Moore	July 10, 2026	TBA
A Sandy Situation: Loomis causes trouble during the campers sandcastle quest after Harper tells him about the fabled Pugness Monster, as his attempts to locate the legendary critter cause setbacks for the others. Big Bubble Trouble: When Loomis accidentally traps Chiffen in a magic bubble during a quest to find more Bramble Berries for a special jelly, the latter becomes scared of trying new things.
20	"The Pugness Monster"	Simon Nicholson	July 17, 2026	TBA
20	"Butterflairy Friends"	Elizabeth Schub Kamir	July 17, 2026	TBA
The Pugness Monster: During a quest to hunt for conch shells, Loomis finally discovers the legendary Pugness Monster, but his friends all want to see it too, and ignore Loomis’ warnings that the monster might be shy around land critters. Butterflairy Friends: Darly and Fifi get into an argument when they chase a purple Butterflairy during the species' yearly migration to a special place, and get both themselves and the Butterflairy trapped in the process.
21	"Snowy Loomis"	Story by : Simon Nicholson; Written by : Davey Moore	July 24, 2026	TBA
21	"Harmony Holiday"	Story by : Mike Kubat & Simon Nicholson; Written by : David Witt	July 24, 2026	TBA
Snowy Loomis: Loomis creates magic snowflakes with his powers for Harmony Holiday, but they start freezing the camp. Harmony Holiday: During the titular holiday, Chipa-Chauns steal the campers presents, and Darly tries making up for losing them on her own.
22	"Night on Melody Mountain"	Elizabeth Schub Kamir & Simon Nicholson	July 31, 2026	TBA
Darly and Loomis take charge during the campers first nighttime quest at the top of Melody Mountain, but they fear a critter named the Grizzle Ogre is after them, throwing the night into chaos.

== Production ==
=== Development ===
The idea for the series was conceived by creator Obie Scott Wade in 2015, with the working title of Mythfits. Wade was interested in the magic of nature as a child and longed to create an animated series with Disney.

Magicampers was greenlit in 2022, and was officially announced on June 13, 2023, at the Annecy International Animation Film Festival. Daniel Dubuis serves as the director, Sandrine Nguyen Tiet serves as the executive producer, and Ashley Mendoza, Simon Nicholson, Elizabeth Kamir serve as lead writers. The series premiered on March 23, 2026, but was previously expected to release in 2024 and 2025.

=== Casting ===
On the series' announcement, Uzo Aduba was reported to be on the voice cast.

=== Animation ===
The animation is produced by Mikros Animation.

== Reception ==
=== Critical response ===
Fernanda Camargo of Common Sense Media rated the series a 3 out of 5 stars, calling the series "colorful, funny, and full of charm." Tony Betti of Laughing Place rated the series a 2.5 out of 5, praising the animation and vibrancy, but criticizing the ambiguity of the series.
