= William T. Dwyer High School =

Coordinates: 26.8761111°N 80.1052778°W

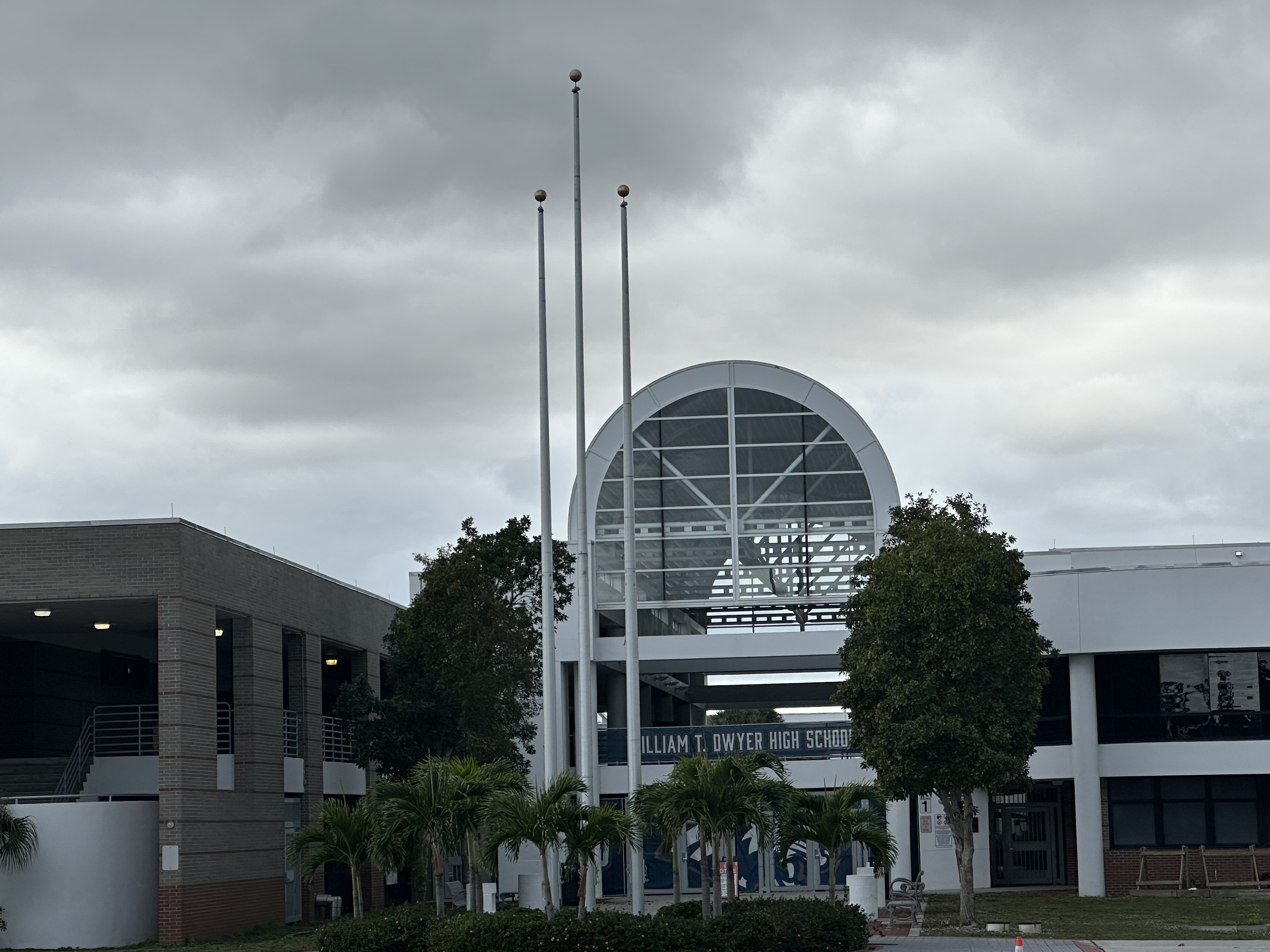

Location
- 13601 N Military Trail; Palm Beach Gardens, Florida 33418; United States

Information
- Type: Public (magnet) secondary
- Established: 1992
- School district: School District of Palm Beach County
- Principal: Corey Brooks
- Teaching staff: 121.00 (FTE)
- Grades: 9–12
- Enrollment: 2,163 (2024-2025)
- Student to teacher ratio: 17.88
- Campus: Suburban
- Colors: Navy Blue, Silver, Maroon
- Mascot: Panther
- Rival: Jupiter High School Palm Beach Gardens Community High School
- Yearbook: Panthera
- Slogan(s): We Are Dwyer, Panther Pride
- Band: Panther Regiment
- Stadium: Blum Stadium
- Website: Official Website

William T. Dwyer High School is a public high school for grades 9–12 in Palm Beach Gardens, Florida, United States. The school was named for William T. Dwyer, former vice president of Pratt & Whitney's Government Products Division and a community leader in Palm Beach County. It is best known for its Academy of Finance Program, which is part of the National Academy Foundation. It is also an International Baccalaureate school. Since its founding in 1991, William T. Dwyer High School competes for state championships in several of their varsity sports including football, basketball, baseball, cross country, track, and lacrosse.

== Notable alumni ==
- Daniel Berger – PGA Tour golfer attended Florida State University and finished 2nd in the 2013 NCAA Division 1 Men's Golf Championships
- Jacoby Brissett – NFL quarterback with the Cleveland Browns, Super Bowl champion with the New England Patriots, played college football at the University of Florida and NC State, 3rd round draft pick
- Rashad Butler – offensive lineman NFL free agent, played college football at the University of Miami
- Todd Centeio - professional football quarterback
- Ricardo Chambers – track and field runner at Florida State University who represented Jamaica in the 400 meter race at the 2008 Summer Olympics in Beijing
- Gerald Christian – tight end for Arizona Cardinals, Mr. Irrelevant in the 2015 NFL draft
- Matt Elam – safety for the Saskatchewan Roughriders, played collegiately at the University of Florida, 1st round draft pick
- Alonzo Gee – small forward/shooting guard for the Denver Nuggets
- Leemire Goldwire – shooting guard for the Charlotte 49ers
- Joel James - basketball player
- Hunter Jones – baseball player
- Tommylee Lewis – NFL wide receiver for New Orleans Saints
- Tim Lynch – baseball player
- Scott Maine – pitcher for the Arizona Diamondbacks, played collegiately for the University of Miami
- Nick O'Leary – tight end for the Buffalo Bills, grandson of Jack Nicklaus, 6th round draft pick
- Ode Osbourne - mixed martial artist in UFC
- Thomas Szapucki – baseball player

== Sports achievements ==
Basketball State Championships: 2004 (Class 5A), 2005 (Class 5A), 2011 (Class 5A) (Class 6A),2023

Bowling State Championships: 1995 (Boys), 2019 (Boys)

Flag Football State Championship: 2005 (Girls)

Football State Championships: 2009 (Class 5A), 2013 (Class 7A)

Lacrosse State Championship: 2009 (Boys)

Track and Field Regional Championship: 2021 (Girls)
