= SheZow =

Australian-Canadian-Malaysian animated comedy television series

- Genre: Superhero; Comedy
- Created by: Obie Scott Wade
- Directed by: Gillian Carr
- Starring: David Myles Brown; Taj Moore; Matt Hill; Diana Kaarina; Sam Vincent; Fantine Banulski; Trevor Devall; Damon Gameau; Maggie Blue O'Hara; Scott McNeil
- Theme music composer: Christopher Elves; Obie Scott Wade
- Opening theme: "SheZow", vocals by Jeff Gunn and Christopher Elves
- Composer: Christopher Elves
- Countries of origin: Australia; Canada; Malaysia
- Original language: English
- No. of seasons: 1
- No. of episodes: 26 (52 segments)

Production
- Executive producers: Obie Scott Wade; Loris Kramer Lunsford; Jason Netter; Gillian Carr; Huoi Seong Low; Brenda Wooding
- Producer: Gillian Carr
- Running time: 22 minutes
- Production companies: Vision Animation; Kickstart Productions; ObieCo; Film Victoria; Moody Street Kids; Network Ten Productions; DHX Media

Original release
- Network: Network Ten
- Release: 15 December 2012 – 2 November 2013

SheZow is an animated superhero comedy television series created by Obie Scott Wade. Inspired by Shazam!, the series features the adventures of a boy who inadvertently inherits the role of a superheroine, which imposes an explicitly feminine theme to his costumed appearance and equipment. It began airing on Network Ten in Australia on 15 December 2012. The series is aimed at children aged 6-11. Produced by Moody Street Kids and Kickstart Productions, it is distributed by DHX Media, and funded in part by Film Victoria. It was designed by Australian artist Kyla May.

As of December 2013, 52 eleven-minute episodes have been made, which are broadcast in pairs to make one season of 26 half-hour episodes. In a 2013 interview, Wade expressed interest in making a second season.

In a 2016 interview, Wade mentioned that he went on to start production of season 2 of SheZow at Hub Network with a bigger budget than the first season. However, after Hub Network went under a major rebranding to Discovery Family, Wade was informed that SheZow season 2's production came to a halt. However, Wade had mentioned that there would be a comic series of SheZow released under his own company, Obieco Entertainment. He released the debut Issue of the SheZow comic series sometime in 2015. Wade had also mentioned that the second issue would release the next year after Issue #1 on Christmas. As of April 2026, Issue #2 was never published.

== Synopsis ==
The series' protagonist, a 12-year-old boy named Guy Hamdon, discovers the superheroine SheZow's ring of power inherited from his late Aunt Agnes; then subsequently puts it on as a mocking lark, and finds himself transformed into a female costumed crime-fighter by uttering the phrase "You Go Girl!"

As it is now on his finger and cannot be removed, Guy uses the power ring to become SheZow; but while it does grant him superpowers, it was only meant to be worn by a girl, so Guy must wear a female superhero costume and pretend that he is a girl while fighting crime. His twin sister, Kelly, assists him primarily at the secret "She-Lair" through remote connection, and Guy's goofy best friend, Maz Kepler, tries to help in his ineffectual way.

== Voice cast ==
- Jacquie Brennan as Sheila, Tara, Grilla, Null, Madame Curiador
- Lyall Brooks as Brian Smirk, Tattoosalla, Cold Finger, Mocktopus, Officer Wackerman, Senior Yo-Yo, Count Pussenbite, Mister Cylinder, Mega Monkey, Caped Koala, Crash Thunder, Aristotle, Brouhaha, Dr. Frankenweather, Fibberachee, Major Attitude, Manny Ken, Void, Periwinkle, Spit Bubble, Moocher, Pushy Pirate Posse, Dudley, Kelli, Captain XL, Mayor Stanley, Link, Sarcazmo, Wishington, Tad, McSniff, Legal Cat
- David Myles Brown as Guy/SheZow (Australia & New Zealand only), Moocher, Pushy Pirate Posse
- Dan Hamill as Officer Boxter, Candy Rapper, Le Pigeon, Moocher, Freddie Fartonavich
- Matt Hill as Maz
- Diana Kaarina as Kelly
- Justin Kennedy as Big Chow Slim
- Elizabeth Nabben as Droosha, Aunt Agnes, Mrs. Creature, Baby Scarington, Uma Thermal
- Cecelia Ramsdale as Gal/DudePow, Wanda
- Sam Vincent as Guy/SheZow (outside Australia & New Zealand), SheZap

=== Crew ===
- Terry Klassen – voice supervisor
- Dale Warren – voice director / sound designer / sound mixer

== Development and production ==
The concept was originally created by Obie Scott Wade as a short film for Disney Channel's Shorty McShorts' Shorts in 2007, which in turn was based on a more adult-oriented short of his named SheeZaam.

In a 2013 interview, Wade stated that the inspiration for SheZow was based on his experiences of watching Saturday-morning cartoons and a general love for superheroes. "When I was a kid I watched a show on Saturday mornings called Shazam! […] it was Shazam and Isis and I just thought it would be interesting to see what would happen if he accidentally said 'SHE-zam,' would he get a different costume or become a different hero?" He added that a lot of the facets to SheZow's mythology came about from the women writers on his team. "I asked the women on my team […] what would be a good weakness for a woman superhero and they all said, 'Bad hair!' […] A lot of the gadgets and jokes [for 'SheZow'] came from women."

== Episodes ==
No.	Title	Written by	Original release date
1a	"SheZow Happens"	Obie Scott Wade	15 December 2012
Guy Hamdon and his family move into their Great Aunt Agnes' house that was handed down to the Hamdon's after her death. During the process of unpacking, Guy and his sister Kelly discover the power ring belonging to the city's current super heroine; SheZow. After jokingly wearing the ring, Guy mistakenly becomes the female super hero- upon discovery the main protagonists go through the process of discovering the hero's powers, super lair, and equipment that comes with said duties.
1b	"Cold Finger"	Lazar Saric	15 December 2012
Appearing at SheZow Con, SheZow pleases and answers a Q&A of SheZow Trivia; In the process of the con, Guy (SheZow) runs into a known nemesis of the super heroine formally known as Coldfinger.
2a	"Makin' Bank"	Obie Scott Wade	16 December 2012
After stopping a robbery taking place in Megadale's national savings, SheZow is caught on security footage making an illegal withdrawal from the bank that is later spent on a video game, SheZow and his sidekick have had their eyes on; it's up to Guy, Kelly, and Maz to get their hands on the security footage to decease Guy from shrinking to nonexistence under the noses of the Megadale Police.
2b	"Super Sidekick"	Brendan Luno	16 December 2012
After Maz saves the day, Guy resents an emotion of jealousy towards his former sidekick; causing the friendship between the two to split apart.
3a	"Glamageddon"	Tania Lacy & Obie Scott Wade	21 December 2012
SheZow appears on the famous talk show of "Gideon Gushy", soon being (unknowingly) face-to-face with SheZow's old ex-crime fighter/best friend, Tara- who soon followed the foot steps of evil. After a moment of unknowing ignorance, SheZow is soon challenged to a glamour battle against the former villain- seeking advice from the only woman figure he knows.
3b	"SheZap"	Tania Lacy & Obie Scott Wade	21 December 2012
After discarding advice from his sister Kelly on keeping SheZow's appearance and hygiene at maintenance, Guy causes a discarded finger nail to become a new threat to Megadale; but this villain has a "green and nasty" twist to a certain super hero.
4a	"S.I.C.K. Day"	Lazar Saric	22 December 2012
One of SheZow's former villains known by Mega Monkey develops a plan to gather a gang of Megadale's most "threatening" villains, but instead of capturing SheZow to stop the inevitable from happening to him; they manage to embarrass and belittle one of Megadale's police force officers known as Guy and Kelly's father (Boxter Hamdon).
4b	"Stuck Up"	Josh Hamilton	22 December 2012
Guy's huge ego causes him to get Ego-itis; causing household objects and lair equipment to force-ably stick to him, giving his sister Kelly the opportunity to abuse the as she claims "cure" for her brother to do anything she demands for her. Will his head shrink down to size, or will everything blow up in his face?
5a	"SheZow Meets DudePow"	Keith Wagnar	23 December 2012
SheZow meets DudePow; the alternate reality version of SheZow, after a failed attempt to defeat SheZow's nemesis. They then must team up to defeat ColdFinger and the alternate reality's villain; Grilla. Although, they can't stand each other! Or is it the total opposite?
5b	"ShePhat"	Dennis Haley & Marcy Brown	23 December 2012
Guy's sponsorship with Fizzburp makes him fat. Can SheZow capture villains, or will crime roam free?
6a	"Guy and Doll"	Becky Overton	28 December 2012
Guy is caught in a dream. Or is it real?
6b	"Family Tree"	Ann Austen	28 December 2012
Guy travels through time to visit his ancestors and save them from Mega Monkey.
7a	"Babysitter Jitters"	John Hardman	29 December 2012
Kelly and Maz get younger with an anti-aging cream, with SheZow as a babysitter.
7b	"No Tattoo 4 U"	Obie Scott Wade	29 December 2012
SheZow faces off against Tattoozala and renews her super hero license.
8a	"A Walk in My Heels"	Kevin Sullivan	30 December 2012
After Guy's stunt, Kelly thinks she has superpowers.
8b	"She-T"	Brendan Luno	30 December 2012
SheZow has to stop aliens before they steal the Earth's oceans.
9a	"Brouhaha"	Dennis Haley & Marcy Brown	6 July 2013
SheZow has to stop a comedian called Brouhaha.
9b	"Shehicle Pickle"	Keith Wagnar	6 July 2013
SheZow has to get his glamrock for the shehicle.
10a	"Momnesia"	Josh Hamilton	13 July 2013
Droosha learns Guy is SheZow.
10b	"Facsimilady"	Denise Downer	13 July 2013
A cleaning robot gets out of control.
11a	"She-Pal"	Justin Kennedy	20 July 2013
Wanda interviews SheZow and Guy tries to keep his secret.
11b	"Le Pigeon"	Ray Boseley	20 July 2013
SheZow battles Le Pigeon, a bird fighting for bird rights.
12a	"In She-D"	Kate Knechtel	27 July 2013
After using expired vanishing cream, Guy starts to disappear.
12b	"Fibberachee"	Mark Fellows	27 July 2013
A jealous star hypnotizes his fans to destroy SheZow.
13a	"Sarcazmo the Great"	S. Armstrong & S. Krause	3 August 2013
A wacky reality TV show host builds a pool for the Hamdon family.
13b	"SheSquatch"	Carter Crocker	3 August 2013
SheZow rescues a SheSquatch from a park ranger.
14a	"Fortune Kooky"	Kevin Nemeth	10 August 2013
Guy gets great fortune from a fortune cookie.
14b	"Black Is the New Pink"	Chris Carter	10 August 2013
SheZow tries to get a graphic novel by trying a new look.
15a	"Mr. Nice Guy"	Eric Truehart	17 August 2013
SheZow gets super-empathy and doesn't fight his enemies.
15b	"Dental Breakdown"	Story by : Dan Reheuser; Teleplay by : Lazar Saric & Obie Scott Wade	17 August 2013
Guy loses a tooth and it corrupts a tooth fairy.
16a	"Crash Thunder"	Tommy Campbell	24 August 2013
A wrestler forfeits a match out of fear and Guy tries to get to the bottom of it.
16b	"Meet Dr. Frankenweather"	Story by : Dan Reheuser; Teleplay by : Ray Boseley	24 August 2013
An ex-weatherman makes crazy weather.
17a	"Maz Junior"	Story by : Dan Reheuser; Teleplay by : Becky Overton	31 August 2013
Maz and Guy save an endangered animal from a wealthy, illegal animal collector.
17b	"Uncommon Cold"	Brendan Luno	31 August 2013
SheZow gets a super cold.
18a	"Transformation Overload"	Carter Crocker	7 September 2013
Guy can't control his transformation and gets a new power.
18b	"Wishington"	Ray Boseley	7 September 2013
Guy goes overboard with wishing.
19a	"PSA-Lister"	Josh Hamilton	14 September 2013
SheZow becomes a PSA lister and more popular on the air waves.
19b	"Friend or Faux"	Story by : Josh Worth; Teleplay by : Carter Crocker, Obie Scott Wade & Josh Worth	14 September 2013
Anita Job takes Kelly's place as SheZow Club President, after Kelly argues with Shezow.
20a	"SheZow for a Day"	Brendan Luno	21 September 2013
Kelly gets to be SheZow for one day.
20b	"No Girls Allowed"	Ann Austen	21 September 2013
A male superhero chauvinist group rejects SheZow.
21a	"Unplugged"	Story by : Dan Reheuser; Teleplay by : Philip Dalkin	28 September 2013
Sheila goes away after Guy misuses her.
21b	"Lawn Gone Mad"	Obie Scott Wade	28 September 2013
Evil plants try to destroy SheZow.
22a	"Evil Villain's Day"	Brendan Luno	5 October 2013
Villains take over and it's illegal to stop them.
22b	"Vampire Cats in Zombie Town"	Eric Truehart	5 October 2013
Guy accidentally brings video game villain Count Pussenbite to life.
23a	"SheZon's Greetings"	Story by : Vivian Geffen; Teleplay by : Dan Reheuser, Obie Scott Wade & Merriwether Williams	12 October 2013
Santa Claus is being held captive by Tatooselah and SheZow comes to his rescue and helps him deliver Christmas presents.
23b	"Snow Way, Dude!"	Doug MacLeod	12 October 2013
Cold Finger is freed from his snow globe prison and plans to do the same to SheZow.
24a	"Hot Rocks"	Nate Knetchel	19 October 2013
While trying to prevent the Earth from exploding, SheZow and Maz meet a rock-n-roll loving lava monster.
24b	"SheZap is Whack"	Obie Scott Wade	19 October 2013
SheZap seals Guy in a glamrock in order to steal the Shehicle.
25a	"Missing Link"	Ray Boseley	26 October 2013
SheZow and Maz find Maz's long-lost uncle Link.
25b	"Null and Void"	Brendan Luno	26 October 2013
Foreign exchange students Null and Void come to Megadale to defeat SheZow.
26a	"Supernatural History"	Ann Austen	2 November 2013
Madame Curiador plans to steal SheZow's ring for a museum exhibit.
26b	"DudePow Returns"	Keith Wagner	2 November 2013
DudePow brings SheZow to her dimension to help fight Mega Monkey.

== Broadcast ==
In the United States, it was added to the schedule lineup of the Hub Network (now Discovery Family) on 1 June 2013 and aired on Discovery Family until 27 December 2015. In the United Kingdom, the series was on Kix in 2016 (later became Pop Max). It is shown on Eleven and 7TWO in Australia. Series 1 was streaming on Netflix from 2015 to 2017.

== Reception ==
The show was considered controversial by several Christian groups for using cross-dressing and transvestism as a source of humour, with One Million Moms, an affiliate of the American Family Association being one of the groups targeting it. In response, series creator Obie Scott Wade stated, "SheZow is not transgendered. He's a boy, his gender never changes, he's just trapped in a silly costume." He also added that he does not find it child-inappropriate at all, because the idea came to him in his youth.

=== Controversy ===
SheZow has a gender-bending character named Guy Hamdon, who transforms into the titular character. However, the show gained attention from anti-LGBT activists who claimed that Guy would "confuse children about gender." However, LGBT advocacy group GLAAD stated that the show is appropriate and that the concept of a superhero having a new persona to be a crime fighter is "very familiar to children." The creator of the show, Obie Scott Wade, denied claims by those such as Ben Shapiro on Breitbart News on the show, stating that there was no "political agenda," and that the critics were reading "a lot into it," saying that the show focuses more on the responsibility of the protagonist and "less about gender." He also said that gender issues were not explored much in the show, and stated in another interview that "SheZow is not transgendered" but is a boy whose gender "never changes" as he is trapped "in a silly costume."
