= Showing Roots =

- Directed by: Michael Wilson
- Written by: Susan Batten
- Produced by: Susan Batten; Michael Mailer; Nick Thurlow
- Starring: Maggie Grace; Elizabeth McGovern; Adam Brody; Uzo Aduba; Cicely Tyson
- Cinematography: Yaron Levy
- Edited by: Andrew Drazek
- Music by: John Gromada
- Production companies: Michael Mailer Films; Upload Films
- Distributed by: Lionsgate Home Entertainment
- Release date: April 23, 2016 (Newport Beach)
- Running time: 100 minutes
- Country: United States
- Language: English

Showing Roots is a 2016 American comedy drama film directed by Michael Wilson and starring Maggie Grace, Elizabeth McGovern, Adam Brody, Uzo Aduba and Cicely Tyson.

== Plot ==
In 1977, in the small town Whynot in the American South, two hairdressers, Violet and Pearl, one white, one African American, go into business for themselves by opening a hair salon named "Salt and Pepper." With hopes it entices clientele from both black and white backgrounds and brings to light Whynot's long standing prejudices.

== Cast ==
- Maggie Grace as Violet
- Uzo Aduba as Pearl
- Elizabeth McGovern as Shirley
- Adam Brody as Bud
- Cicely Tyson as Hattie

== Production ==
The film was shot in Baton Rouge, Louisiana.

== Reception ==
Renee Schonfeld of Common Sense Media awarded the film two stars out of five.

=== Accolades ===
The film won the Spirit of Freedom Narrative Award at the Bahamas Film Festival and the Best Feature Film Award at the Maryland International Film Festival.
