= Pearly Gates (film) =

- Directed by: Scott Ehrlich
- Written by: Scott Ehrlich; Penny Orloff
- Produced by: Scott Ehrlich
- Starring: Scott Grimes; Uzo Aduba; Lainie Kazan
- Cinematography: Denis Maloney
- Edited by: Michael Darrow
- Release date: April 26, 2015 (Newport Beach)
- Running time: 88 minutes
- Country: United States
- Language: English

Pearly Gates is a 2015 American drama film directed by Scott Ehrlich and starring Scott Grimes, Uzo Aduba (her film debut) and Lainie Kazan.

== Cast ==
- Scott Grimes as Richard Whiner
- Bonnie Somerville as Sharon
- Illeana Douglas as Karen
- Uzo Aduba as Corrie
- Hill Harper as Dave
- Lainie Kazan as Millie
- Sam McMurray as Sol
- Jack Noseworthy as Dan
- Peter Bogdanovich as Marty
- Larry Miller as Rabbi
- Vincent Spano as The Mayor / Satan
- Jason Gray-Stanford as The Assistant

== Production and Reception ==
The movie was based on a staged musical of the same name from 2011. It was filmed it 2015 in California. Sheri Linden of The Hollywood Reporter described it as, "an ostensible comedy," with "banal observations about what it means to be remembered."
