= One Second After (film) =

Upcoming American science fiction film

- Teaser poster
- Directed by: Scott Rogers
- Screenplay by: J. Michael Straczynski; Nicole Roewe
- Based on: One Second After by William R. Forstchen
- Produced by: Rob Pfaltzgraff; Nick Reid; Matt Kennedy
- Starring: Famke Janssen; Josh Holloway; Hannah John-Kamen; Mary McDonnell
- Cinematography: Brad Shield
- Edited by: Tim Murrell
- Music by: Jackson Greenberg
- Production companies: Moving Picture Institute; Startling Inc.
- Distributed by: Roadside Attractions
- Release date: April 30, 2027
- Country: United States
- Language: English

One Second After is an upcoming American science fiction thriller film directed by Scott Rogers from a script adaptation by J. Michael Straczynski and Nicole Roewe of the 2009 novel of the same name by William R. Forstchen. It stars Famke Janssen, Josh Holloway, Hannah John-Kamen, and Mary McDonnell.

The film is scheduled to be theatrically released in the United States on April 30, 2027, by Roadside Attractions.

== Premise ==
In a small North Carolina town, a former military officer must protect his family and community after North Korea sets off 3 electromagnetic pulse bombs 27 miles above the US, disabling all technology, plunging the North American Hemisphere into chaos exposing the fragility of civilization.

== Cast ==
- Famke Janssen as Mayor Kate Lindsey
- Josh Holloway as John Matherson
- Hannah John-Kamen as Makalya
- Mary McDonnell as Jen Matherson
- Johnna Dias-Watson as Elizabeth
- Kennedy Moyer as Jennifer
- John Eric Bentley as Pastor Dan
- Kaya Bayley-Hay as Cheryl

== Production ==
The option for the film rights to One Second After was initially sold to Warner Bros. Pictures but eventually expired. As of August 2011, a new option was being negotiated with another unknown studio.

In November 2021, the film rights for the book series were licensed to MPI Original Films. J. Michael Straczynski was to be involved with the production and would be writing the screenplay. Scott Rogers was hired to direct the film, and Famke Janssen, Josh Holloway, Hannah John-Kamen, Mary McDonnell, Johnna Dias-Watson, Kennedy Moyer, John Eric Bentley and Kaya Bayley-Hay joined the cast.

Principal photography began in September 2025, in Sofia, and wrapped in December 2025.

== Release ==
In November 2026, Roadside Attractions acquired U.S. distribution rights to the film, scheduling it for a theatrical release on April 30, 2027.
