= Michael Wilson (director) =

American stage director (born 1964)

- Born: 1964 (age 61–62); United States
- Occupation: Director

Michael Wilson (born 1964) is an American stage and screen director working extensively on Broadway, Off-Broadway, and at the nation's leading resident theaters.

He made his screen directorial debut with the 2014 Lifetime/Ostar television film adaptation of Horton Foote's The Trip to Bountiful, which was nominated for two 2014 Emmy Awards and six 2015 NAACP/Image Awards—including Outstanding Television Movie – as well as a DGA Award for Outstanding Direction of a Movie or Mini-Series for Television. The film won three 2015 NAACP/Image Awards.

Showing Roots was his first indie film produced by Michael Mailer Films in association with Bill Haber. It starred Uzo Aduba, Maggie Grace, Elizabeth McGovern, Adam Brody and Cicely Tyson. It won Best Narrative Film awards at the 2015 Bahamas and 2016 Maryland International Film (Hagerstown) Festivals, and was acquired by Lifetime for broadcast in May 2016.

On Broadway, Wilson directed the 2013 Tony Award-winning revival of The Trip to Bountiful starring Cicely Tyson, Cuba Gooding Jr, Vanessa Williams and Condola Rashad. Other Broadway productions include the 2012 Tony nominated revival of Gore Vidal’s The Best Man (starring James Earl Jones, Angela Lansbury, Candice Bergen, John Larroquette, Eric McCormack, John Stamos, Kristin Davis, and Michael McKean); the Tony nominated Best Plays Dividing the Estate (starring Elizabeth Ashley and Gerald McRaney); and Enchanted April (starring Jayne Atkinson and Molly Ringwald).

Off-Broadway, he directed the 2015 Signature revival of Arthur Miller's Incident at Vichy starring Richard Thomas, which was subsequently filmed for television and broadcast in 2016 on Theater Close-Up by WNET 13 and BroadwayHD. In 2010, he received Drama Desk and Outer Critics Circle Awards for his direction of Foote's three-part, nine-hour epic The Orphans’ Home Cycle.

Internationally, he directed both parts of Tony Kushner's Angels in America for the 1995 Venice Biennale.

Wilson directed the Los Angeles premiere of the musical Grey Gardens starring Betty Buckley and Rachel York for CTG/Ahmanson Theater at the Music Center.

== Career ==
In an interview in 2008, Wilson noted:

Like most directors, I want to show a variety of work. I've done Shakespeare, Chekhov, and O'Neill, as well as new work. Some people have defined my body of work as being dominated by female characters, and this play is no exception. I have collaborated many times with Elizabeth Ashley, who plays the matriarch in Dividing, I don't necessarily subscribe to the notion that I am "a woman's director." But I would say that I am drawn to plays that deal with family situations. In the plays I work on I want there to be a real moment of catharsis. I am always looking to let the audience have some kind of emotional connection. That's one of the reasons why I love Horton's [Foote] plays so much: they allow that connection.

=== Hartford Stage ===
As artistic director from 1998 to 2011, Wilson commissioned and developed numerous new works, including the 2012 Pulitzer Prize-winning play Water By the Spoonful by Quiara Alegria Hudes. He directed seventeen productions for Hartford Stage, including the premiere of Enchanted April (which subsequently transferred to Broadway, garnering a 2003 Best Play Tony Award nomination, and 9 Outer Critics Circle nominations, including Best Director). He directed the premieres of Horton Foote’s The Orphans' Home Cycle (2010 Drama Desk and Outer Critics Circle Awards); The Carpetbagger’s Children (2002 Best Play, American Theater Critics Award) and Eve Ensler’s Necessary Targets, all which subsequently transferred Off-Broadway; Williams's The Glass Menagerie (which subsequently toured to Houston and Boston where it won the 2002 Elliot Norton Award for Outstanding Visiting Production); O’Neill's Long Day’s Journey Into Night; and Shakespeare's Macbeth.

Under his leadership, in addition to the Tennessee Williams Marathon—the first national, multi-year retrospective of the American playwright—Hartford Stage focused on the development of new work, a vast expansion of its education and outreach programs, and helped raise 17 million dollars which accomplished among many things the company's first major renovation of its John W. Huntington Theater home since that facility opened in 1977.

Wilson also forged new collaborations with Houston's Alley Theatre, Harvard's American Repertory Theater, the Dallas Theater Center, the Guthrie Theater, The Shakespeare Theatre, and Chicago's Steppenwolf Theatre.

=== Broadway ===
- The Trip to Bountiful by Horton Foote, 2013 (Stephen Sondheim Theatre)
- The Best Man, by Gore Vidal, 2012 (Schoenfeld Theater)
- Dividing the Estate, by Horton Foote, 2008, (Lincoln Center Theater at the Booth)
- Old Acquaintances, by John Van Druten, 2007 (Roundabout Theatre at the American Airlines Theater)
- Enchanted April, by Matthew Barber, 2003 (Belasco Theatre)

=== Off-Broadway (selected) ===
Source: IOBDB

Arthur Miller's Incident at Vichy, 2015 (Signature Theater Company)

Horton Foote's The Old Friends, 2013 (STC)

Lanford Wilson's Talley's Folly 2013 (RTC)

Christopher Shinn's Picked 2011 (Vineyard Theater)

Tennessee Williams' The Milk Train Doesn't Stop Here Anymore 2011 (RTC)

- Horton Foote's The Orphans' Home Cycle, 2010 (STC)
- Horton Foote's Dividing The Estate, 2007 (Primary Stages)
- Horton Foote's The Day Emily Married, 2004 (Primary Stages)
- Horton Foote's The Carpetbagger’s Children, 2002 (Lincoln Center Theater)
- Christopher Shinn's What Didn’t Happen, 2002 (Playwrights Horizons)
- Necessary Targets, by Eve Ensler, 2002 (Variety Arts)
- Jane Anderson's Defying Gravity, 1997 (Laura Pels Theatre)
- Tennessee Williams's The Red Devil Battery Sign, 1996 (WPA Theatre)

=== Resident ===
- The Alley Theatre (associate director, 1990–98)
- American Repertory Theatre
- Berkeley Repertory Theatre
- Center Theater Group/Ahmanson
- Goodman Theatre
- Guthrie Theatre
- Huntington Theater
- La Jolla Playhouse
- Long Wharf Theatre
- New York Stage and Film
- Old Globe Theater
- Philadelphia Theatre Company
- PlayMakers Repertory Company
- Wallis

=== International ===
- Angels in America Parts I & II, 1995 Venice Biennale

== Personal ==
Wilson grew up in Winston-Salem, North Carolina and graduated from Richard J. Reynolds High School. He went on to attend the University of North Carolina at Chapel Hill, where he graduated a Morehead scholar in 1987. Since 2015, he has served as Treasurer of the Stage Directors and Choreographers Society (SDC).

=== Other ===
- 2001–2003, Connecticut Commission on the Arts
- 2003 Citizen of the Year by the Greater Hartford Civitan Club

== Honors and awards ==
Source for certain honors: American Theatre Wing

- 2010 Drama Desk and Outer Critics Circle Awards for his direction of Horton Foote's The Orphans' Home Cycle
- Daryl Roth 2002 Creative Spirit Award, Lincoln Center Theater
- Princess Grace Foundation, 2001 Statue Award and 1992 Theatre fellowship
- Edward Albee Foundation 1992 fellowship
- Connecticut Critics Circle (various), including the 2005 Tom Killen Award
