= Animal (TV series) =

Netflix american nature documentary series

- Film poster
- Genre: Nature documentary
- Narrated by: Anthony Mackie; Bryan Cranston; Rebel Wilson; Rashida Jones; Andy Serkis; David Harbour; Uzo Aduba; Pedro Pascal
- Composer: Jasha Klebe
- Country of origin: United States
- Original language: English
- No. of seasons: 2
- No. of episodes: 8

Production
- Producers: Bill Markham, Adrian Seymour, Anushka Schofield, Alex Minton, Rob Morgan
- Editors: Stef Watkins, Debs Williams, Paul Kiff, Tom Wright, Jack Roberts, Rupert Troskie
- Production company: Plimsoll Productions

Original release
- Network: Netflix
- Release: November 10, 2021 – March 18, 2022

Animal is a nature documentary series made for Netflix. Each episode is narrated by a different actor - Anthony Mackie, Bryan Cranston, Rebel Wilson, Rashida Jones, Andy Serkis, Uzo Aduba, David Harbour and Pedro Pascal. It follows the world's most magnificent creatures, capturing never-before-seen moments, both heartwarming and extreme. The series was released on Netflix on November 10, 2021. It was nominated for Outstanding Nature Documentary at the 2023 Emmys.

== Episodes ==
Series overview
| Season | Episodes | Originally released |
|---|---|---|
| 1 | 4 | November 10, 2021 |
| 2 | 4 | March 18, 2022 |

=== Season 1 (2021) ===
| No. overall | No. in season | Title | Directed by | Narrated by | Original release date |
|---|---|---|---|---|---|
| 1 | 1 | "Big Cats" | Bill Markham | Rashida Jones | November 10, 2021 |
Majestic, powerful and deadly, big cats were once thought to be solitary creatures. But we're now realizing just how collaborative they can be.
| 2 | 2 | "Dogs" | Adrian Seymour | Bryan Cranston | November 10, 2021 |
Be it foxes on city streets or wolves on the tundra, canines rely on sharp senses, athleticism and fierce determination to punch above their weight.
| 3 | 3 | "Marsupials" | Alex Minton | Rebel Wilson | November 10, 2021 |
It's not all about the pouches. These mammalian misfits are full of surprises, from flamboyant kangaroo showdowns to rattling koala mating calls.
| 4 | 4 | "Octopus" | Anuschka Schofield | Pedro Pascal | November 10, 2021 |
In changing seas and oceans, cephalopods like the cuttlefish and the giant Pacific octopus must rely on their remarkable intelligence to survive.

=== Season 2 (2022) ===
| No. overall | No. in season | Title | Directed by | Narrated by | Original release date |
|---|---|---|---|---|---|
| 5 | 1 | "Apes" | Adrian Seymour | Andy Serkis | March 18, 2022 |
Smart, sensitive and family-oriented, our wild ape relatives rely on each other to learn — and redefine — the secrets of survival.
| 6 | 2 | "Birds of Prey" | Rob Morgan | Anthony Mackie | March 18, 2022 |
Curved talons, hooked beaks, killer eyesight: these aerial assassins have the most sophisticated tools for hunting prey at their disposal.
| 7 | 3 | "Bears" | Alex Minton | David Harbour | March 18, 2022 |
To rule some of the planet's most hostile lands, bears can't lean solely on brute force: it takes both brains and brawn to reach the top.
| 8 | 4 | "Dolphins" | Anuschka Schofield | Uzo Aduba | March 18, 2022 |
Dolphins use their intelligence to form complex undersea societies, come up with resourceful hunting techniques — and indulge in their dark side.
