= Marc Mauer =

American advocate for criminal justice reform

- Education: Stony Brook University; University of Michigan School of Social Work
- Occupation: Executive director of the Sentencing Project

Marc Mauer was the executive director of the Sentencing Project, a group that advocates for criminal justice reform and addressing racial disparities in the United States criminal-justice system.

== Education ==
Mauer received his bachelor's degree from Stony Brook University and his Master of Social Work from the University of Michigan.

== Career ==
Mauer's career in criminal justice began with the American Friends Service Committee in 1975, where he served as the National Justice Communications Coordinator before joining the Sentencing Project in 1987. He became the Project's executive director in 2005.

== Views ==
Mauer has been highly critical of the very high rate at which America incarcerates both violent and nonviolent offenders in recent decades, and that "we're well past the point of diminishing returns for public safety." He has also encouraged Congress to pass sentencing reform to combat what he says are the adverse effects of the war on drugs.
