= Javier Peña =

American DEA agent

Javier F. Peña
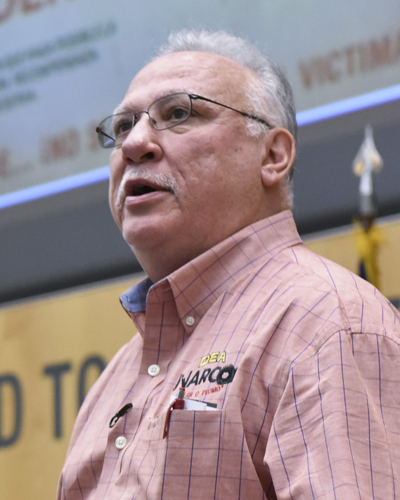
- Peña in 2018
- Born: 1958 (age 67–68); Kingsville, Texas, U.S.
- Education: Texas A&M University-Kingsville
- Known for: Hunt for Pablo Escobar
- Career
- Agency: Webb County Sheriff’s Office; Drug Enforcement Administration
- Service years: 1975–2014
- Status: Retired

Javier F. Peña (born 1958) is an American former Drug Enforcement Administration agent who investigated Pablo Escobar and the Medellín Cartel. Peña worked as a consultant on the Netflix series Narcos, in which he was played by Pedro Pascal.

== Biography ==
Peña was raised in Hebbronville, Texas, and graduated from Hebbronville High School. He attended Texas A&M University where he studied sociology and psychology. Peña served as a deputy sheriff for Webb County sheriff’s office in Laredo from 1975 to 1984, and then continued his service with the DEA until his retirement. He was involved in the 1985 capture of Mexican drug lord Rafael Caro Quintero.

Following the investigation of the Medellín Cartel, Peña worked for the DEA with additional assignments in Puerto Rico, Texas and Colombia. Peña was promoted to special agent in charge of the San Francisco office in 2004, the Caribbean office in 2008, and finally the Houston office in 2011, before retiring in 2014.

In 2019, he published Manhunters: How We Took Down Pablo Escobar with Stephen Murphy.

== In popular culture ==
Peña is one of the main characters in the three seasons of Netflix TV series Narcos, in which his character is portrayed by Pedro Pascal. Peña himself worked as a consultant on the show. He makes a cameo appearance in the last episode of Season 2, "Al Fin Cayó!", alongside Murphy.

In 2013, TV series Tres Caínes is portrayed by the Cuban actor Barbaro Marin as the character of Andrew Miller.
