= Tim Lynch =

American baseball player (born 1993)

- First baseman
- Born: June 3, 1993 (age 32); Jupiter, Florida, U.S.
- Bats: Left Throws: Right

Timothy Lynch (born June 3, 1993) is an American former professional baseball first baseman.

== Career ==
Lynch attended William T. Dwyer High School in Palm Beach Gardens, Florida. He enrolled at the University of Southern Mississippi to play college baseball for the Southern Miss Golden Eagles. After Lynch was not selected in the 2015 Major League Baseball draft, he received contract offers from the Los Angeles Dodgers and Cincinnati Reds, but opted to return to Southern Miss for his senior season.

As a senior, Lynch batted .365 with a 1.045 on-base plus slugging. He was named to the All-Conference USA team and the All-Tournament Team for the 2016 Conference USA baseball tournament. He was also named a third team All-American. The New York Yankees selected Lynch in the ninth round, with the 278th overall selection, of the 2016 Major League Baseball draft. He signed with the Yankees, receiving a $10,000 signing bonus. He began his professional career with the Pulaski Yankees of the Rookie-level Appalachian League., and was later assigned to the GCL Yankees; he posted a combined .248 batting average with 22 RBIs in 47 games between both clubs. He spent 2017 with the Tampa Yankees where he batted .310 with 13 home runs and 40 RBIs, along with a .940 OPS.

Lynch was released from his contract by the Tampa Tarpons on May 14, 2018.

== Personal life ==
Lynch is an autograph collector. Growing up near Roger Dean Stadium, he had season tickets to the Florida State League, and collected over 20,000 autographs from baseball players, including over 100 from Miguel Cabrera.
