= Obie Scott Wade =

American screenwriter and producer

Obie Scott Wade is an American producer, director, and screenwriter. He is known for creating SheZow and Magicampers.

== Career ==
Wade worked on Where in the World Is Carmen Sandiego? and Mister Rogers' Neighborhood. He co-wrote eight episodes of Baby Looney Tunes, a Warner Bros. show. He also worked on Al Roach: Private Insectigator; and Deer Mike, a Disney show.

In 2001, Wade was an executive at Zeroes and Ones, a production studio in Santa Monica, California. Wade was co-creator with Paul Frank of the animated series, Julius & Friends, what was launched on Sony's screenblast.com in 2002. He was also the show's producer and director. The "Yeti Set Go" episode was selected for the 2000 Sundance Film Festival. An episode of the show was selected again in 2001, the Sundance Film Festival said that "this good-humored tale explores such issues as friendship, fate, and hot chocolate." In 2001, Wade and Michael Adamo received a Certificate of Merit, a Children's Jury Prize, at the Chicago International Children's Film Festival for Julius & Friends: Hole in One.

In 2012, Wade created the show SheZow, an animated comedy about a boy who transforms into a super hero while clad in a female costume. SheZow was targeted to 6- to 11-year-old children. It was funded by Film Victoria and launched on Network Ten in Australia. There was backlash at the show's United States premiere on The Hub (now Discovery Family) when it was seen as a show about a transgender child. Romeo San Vicente states, "Technically that makes him a situational transvestite in the service of law and order and, clearly, young audiences are already understanding that it no more makes the character transgender (a word most of them have probably never encountered) than the Batman costume turns Bruce Wayne into an actual flying mammal of the order chiroptera." The show's critics included the Catholic League, American Family Association, and One Million Moms, who said the show was an "attempt by the gay, lesbian and transgender community to indoctrinate our children into accepting their lifestyles."

In 2013, Wade was listed among the "rising stars in animation" by Animation Magazine. Wade was co-author of the juvenile fiction book, Oddry, which was published in 2014.
