= Uzo Aduba =

American actress (born 1981)

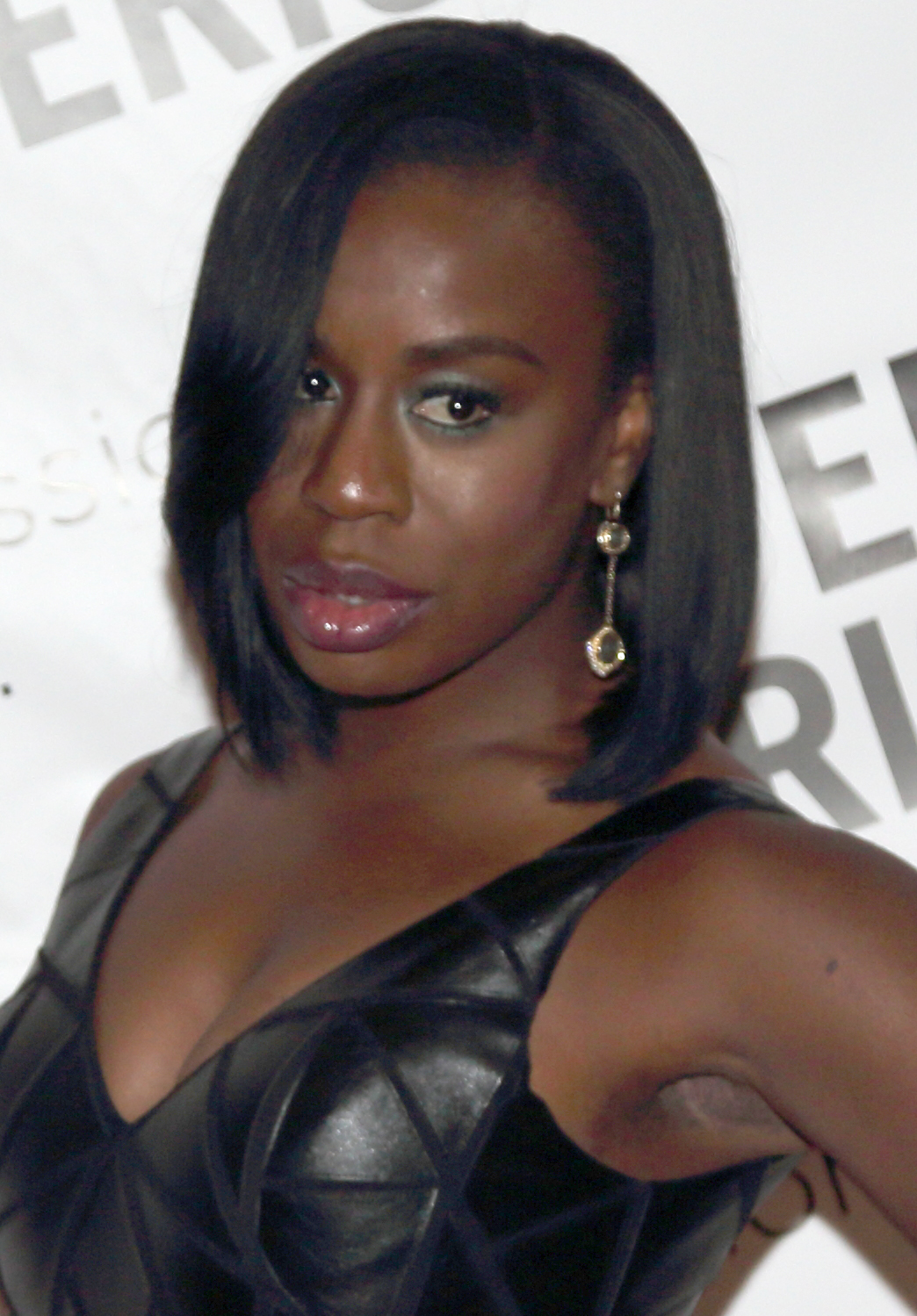
- Aduba in 2014
- Born: Uzoamaka Nwanneka Aduba; February 10, 1981 (age 45); Boston, Massachusetts, U.S.
- Education: Boston University (BM)
- Occupation: Actress
- Years active: 2003–present
- Spouse: Robert Sweeting (m. 2020)
- Children: 1

Uzoamaka Nwanneka "Uzo" Aduba ( /ˈuːzoʊ əˈduːbə/; born February 10, 1981) is an American actress. Her accolades include three Emmy Awards and five Screen Actors Guild Awards, in addition to nominations for three Golden Globe Awards and one Tony Award. She is one of only two actors to win an Emmy Award in both the comedy and drama categories for the same role, the other being Ed Asner.

Aduba has appeared in films including American Pastoral (2016), My Little Pony: The Movie (2017), Candy Jar (2018), Steven Universe: The Movie (2019), Miss Virginia (2019), National Champions (2021), and Lightyear (2022).

She gained wide recognition for her role as Suzanne "Crazy Eyes" Warren on the Netflix original series Orange Is the New Black (2013–2019). Her performance won an Emmy Award for Outstanding Guest Actress in a Comedy Series in 2014, an Emmy Award for Outstanding Supporting Actress in a Drama Series in 2015, and two SAG Awards for Outstanding Performance by a Female Actor in a Comedy Series in 2014 and 2015. In 2020, Aduba played Shirley Chisholm in the Hulu miniseries Mrs. America, for which she won an Emmy Award for Outstanding Supporting Actress in a Limited Series or Movie and the Critics' Choice Television Award for Best Supporting Actress in a Movie/Miniseries. In 2021, she starred in Lynn Nottage's play Clyde's on Broadway for which she was nominated for the Tony Award for Best Featured Actress in a Play. Aduba starred in the 2025 Netflix series The Residence, earning a nomination for Outstanding Lead Actress in a Comedy Series at the 77th Primetime Emmy Awards.

== Early life and education ==
Uzoamaka Nwanneka Aduba was born in Boston, Massachusetts, to Igbo parents from Nigeria and grew up in Medfield, Massachusetts. She graduated from Medfield High School in 1999. She attended Boston University, where she studied classical voice and competed in track and field. She has called her family a "sports family". As a child she was a promising figure skater. Her younger brother, Obi, played hockey at the University of Massachusetts Amherst and six seasons professionally.

== Career ==
=== Early roles ===
Marking one of her early significant achievements in acting, Uzo Aduba's performance in Translations of Xhosa at the Olney Theatre Center in 2003 earned her a nomination for the Helen Hayes Award for Outstanding Supporting Actress in a Resident Play. In 2006, she played Amphiarus in The Seven at New York Theatre Workshop and again in 2008 at La Jolla Playhouse. In 2007, she made her Broadway debut, portraying Toby in Helen Edmundson's adaptation of Coram Boy at the Imperial Theatre. In 2011–12, she sang "By My Side" as part of the original revival cast of Godspell at the Circle in the Square Theatre. Her first television appearance was as a nurse on Blue Bloods in 2012. Aduba also played Anna, the mother of the title character in Venice at The Public Theater in New York.

=== 2013–2019: Orange Is the New Black ===
In 2013, Aduba began portraying Suzanne "Crazy Eyes" Warren in the Netflix comedy-drama series Orange Is the New Black. On being cast, Aduba said:

I auditioned for the show back in late July or early August of [2012]. I had been auditioning that summer for more television and film [after doing much theater]. I'd read a lot of scripts and I remember reading Orange Is the New Black, and it was at the head of the pack. I remember thinking, 'Wow, that is really good, I would love to be a part of that.' I went in and auditioned for another part, and my representatives called me about a month later and they were like, "Hi, we have some really good news. You remember that audition you went on for Orange Is the New Black? You didn't get it." I go, "So… okay, what's the good news?" They said they wanted to offer me another part, Crazy Eyes. I was like, "What in my audition would make someone think I'd be right for a part called Crazy Eyes?" But to be honest, when I got the script for it, it felt like the right fit.

Casting director Jennifer Euston explains the selection of Aduba for the role thus: "Uzo Aduba...had her hair in those knots for the audition...They saw something amazing in her and were able to connect it to what they were looking for in Crazy Eyes." In joining the series, Aduba obtained her Screen Actors Guild card, of which she said, "I was just like, 'Wow, this means I'm a full actress now.' It was such a big deal, and I remember being so thankful and feeling so proud."

Aduba has been recognized for her performance as "Crazy Eyes", winning Outstanding Guest Actress in a Comedy Series at the 66th Primetime Creative Arts Emmy Awards and Best Guest Performer in a Comedy Series at the 4th Critics' Choice Television Awards. She was nominated for Best Supporting Actress – Series, Miniseries, or Television Film at the 18th Satellite Awards for her season one performance. Aduba's season two performance earned her the Outstanding Performance by a Female Actor in a Comedy Series at the 21st Screen Actors Guild Awards and a nomination for Best Supporting Actress – Series, Miniseries, or Television Film at the 72nd Golden Globe Awards.

Aduba won a second Primetime Emmy in 2015, taking home the award for Outstanding Supporting Actress in a Drama Series, making her one of only two actors to win both a drama and comedy Emmy for the same role (the other being Ed Asner). Her performance in the third season earned another Outstanding Performance by a Female Actor in a Comedy Series win at the 22nd Screen Actors Guild Awards. Aduba also earned a Best Supporting Actress – Series, Miniseries, or Television Film at the 73rd Golden Globe Awards.

In March 2014, Aduba performed at Broadway Backwards, the Broadway Cares/Equity Fights AIDS benefit concert. She teamed with Rachel Bay Jones for a rendition of the song "Lily's Eyes" from the musical The Secret Garden. In 2015, Aduba played Glinda the Good Witch in the NBC live musical event special The Wiz Live!, receiving positive reviews from critics.

Aduba made her film debut in the 2015 musical comedy-drama film Pearly Gates. The next year, she starred alongside Maggie Grace in the comedy-drama Showing Roots and played supporting roles in Tallulah, Steven Universe, and American Pastoral directed by Ewan McGregor. Aduba played a major role in the 2017 musical animated film My Little Pony: The Movie, voicing Queen Novo, leader of the hippogriffs/seaponies. She co-starred in two Netflix films; Candy Jar in 2018, and Beats in 2019. Also in 2019, Aduba played the title role in the film Miss Virginia.

=== 2020–present: Limited series and theatre work ===
After Orange Is the New Black ended, Aduba was cast as politician Shirley Chisholm in the Hulu miniseries Mrs. America (2020), opposite Cate Blanchett and Sarah Paulson. Chisholm was the first black candidate for a major party's nomination for President of the United States, the first woman to run for the Democratic Party's presidential nomination, and the first woman to appear in a United States presidential debate. The miniseries garnered critical acclaim and secured Aduba a Primetime Emmy Award for Outstanding Supporting Actress in a Limited Series or Movie.

She was cast to star opposite Lupita Nyong'o in the HBO Max miniseries Americanah written by Danai Gurira that was ultimately unproduced. Aduba also was set to star in the fourth season of FX series Fargo, but dropped out due to "some personal family issues". Aduba co-starred in the 2020 romantic drama film Really Love. In October 2020, she was cast as therapist Dr. Brooke Taylor in the fourth season of the HBO series In Treatment.

In 2021, Aduba appeared in the Broadway production of the Lynn Nottage play Clyde's, for which she received a Tony Award nomination. In 2023, she starred as Edie Flowers in Netflix's Painkiller, a limited series exploring the reasons behind the opioid epidemic in the United States. In 2024, her memoir, The Road is Good: How a Mother's strength became Her Daughter's Purpose, was published by Viking Books. Aduba stars as eccentric detective Cordelia Cupp in Shonda Rhimes's 2025 White House-set murder mystery series The Residence. Aduba provides the voice of Treena the magical talking tree in the Disney Junior tv show Magicampers.

== Advocacy ==
- In April 2017, Aduba received the Point Courage Award from the Point Foundation for her support of the LGBT community.
- In June 2018, Aduba became Heifer International's first-ever celebrity ambassador to Africa. She saw Heifer's impact firsthand on 2016 and 2018 field visits to Uganda.
- In July 2020, Aduba was announced as a minority investor in a then unnamed Los Angeles team, later unveiled as Angel City FC, that is scheduled to start play in the National Women's Soccer League in 2022.
- In 2025, Aduba narrated the PBS documentary “Caregiving”, executive produced by Bradley Cooper.

== Personal life ==
Growing up in an all-white neighborhood, Aduba often felt isolated, but her close relationship with her mother and their Nigerian identity and history helped her to develop her sense of self-worth.

On September 12, 2021, Aduba announced she had married filmmaker Robert Sweeting in 2020. The couple had had a secret ceremony in New York. On June 11, 2023, at the 2023 Tony Awards, Aduba announced the couple were expecting their first child. On November 12, 2023, Aduba welcomed a baby girl.

== Acting credits ==
Key
†	Denotes productions that have not yet been released

=== Film ===
Year	Title	Role	Notes
2015	Pearly Gates	Corrie	
2015	Alvin and the Chipmunks: The Road Chip	TSA Officer	Cameo
2016	Tallulah	Detective Louisa Kinnie	
2016	American Pastoral	Vicky	
2016	Showing Roots	Pearl	
2017	My Little Pony: The Movie	Queen Novo	Voice role
2018	Candy Jar	Julia Russell	
2018	We Are Boats	Sir	
2019	Beats	Carla Monroe	
2019	Steven Universe: The Movie	Bismuth	Voice role
2019	Miss Virginia	Virginia Walden	
2020	Really Love	Chenai Hungwe	
2021	National Champions	Katherine Poe	
2022	Lightyear	Alisha Hawthorne	Voice role
2024	The Supremes at Earl's All-You-Can-Eat	Clarice	
2024	Greedy People	Officer Murphy	
2025	Roofman	Eileen	

=== Television ===
Year	Title	Role	Notes
2012	Blue Bloods	Nurse	Episode: "Nightmares"
2013	How to Live Like a Lady	Acting Teacher	Television film
2013–2019	Orange Is the New Black	Suzanne "Crazy Eyes" Warren	Recurring role (season 1); main role (seasons 2–7)
2014	Saturday Night Live	Daughter Dudley	Episode: "Woody Harrelson/Kendrick Lamar"
2015	Comedy Bang! Bang!	Herself	Episode: "Uzo Aduba Wears a White Blouse and Royal Blue Heels"
2015	The Wiz Live!	Glinda the Good Witch	Television special
2016–2019	Steven Universe	Bismuth	Voice, 9 episodes
2018–2019	3Below: Tales of Arcadia	Officer Kubritz	Voice, 11 episodes
2020	Steven Universe Future	Bismuth, Khadijah	Voice, episode: "Bismuth Casual"
2020	Mrs. America	Shirley Chisholm	Miniseries
2021	In Treatment	Dr. Brooke Taylor	Main role
2021	Solos	Sasha	Episode: "Sasha"
2021	Last Week Tonight with John Oliver	Herself	Episode: "Hair"
2022	Animal	Narrator	Voice, episode: "Dolphins"
2022	Ada Twist, Scientist	Lifeguard	Voice, episode: "Swift The Waves"
2023	Painkiller	Edie Flowers	Netflix miniseries
2025	The Residence	Cordelia Cupp	Main role
2025	Caregiving	Narrator	Television film
2026–present	Magicampers	Treena	Voice, series regular

=== Theater ===
Year	Title	Role	Notes
2006	The Seven	Amphiarus	New York Theatre Workshop
2007	Coram Boy	Toby	Imperial Theatre, Broadway
2008	The Seven	Amphiarus	La Jolla Playhouse, Los Angeles
2009	Eclipsed	Helena	Woolly Mammoth Theatre Company
2009	A Civil War Christmas	Hannah	Huntington Theatre, Boston
2011	Godspell	Company	Circle in the Square Theatre, Broadway
2011	Prometheus Bound	Io	American Repertory Theater, Cambridge
2013	Venice	Anna Monroe	The Public Theater, Off-Broadway
2016	The Maids	Solange	Trafalgar Studios, West End
2021	Clyde's	Clyde	Hayes Theatre, Broadway

== Awards and nominations ==
Organizations	Year	Category	Work	Result	Ref.
Critics' Choice Television Award	2014	Best Guest Performer in a Comedy Series	Orange Is the New Black	Won	
Critics' Choice Television Award	2021	Best Supporting Actress in a Limited Series or Television Movie	Mrs. America	Won	
Critics' Choice Television Award	2022	Best Actress in a Drama Series	In Treatment	Nominated	
Glamour Awards	2016	Comedy Actress	Orange Is the New Black	Nominated	
Golden Globe Awards	2015	Best Supporting Actress – Series, Miniseries or Television Film	Orange is the New Black (season one)	Nominated	
Golden Globe Awards	2016	Best Supporting Actress – Series, Miniseries or Television Film	Orange is the New Black (season two)	Nominated	
Golden Globe Awards	2022	Best Actress – Television Series Drama	In Treatment	Nominated	
NAACP Image Awards	2015	Outstanding Actress in a Comedy Series	Orange Is the New Black	Nominated	
NAACP Image Awards	2016	Outstanding Actress in a Comedy Series	Orange Is the New Black	Nominated	
NAACP Image Awards	2017	Outstanding Actress in a Comedy Series	Orange Is the New Black	Nominated	
NAACP Image Awards	2018	Outstanding Actress in a Comedy Series	Orange Is the New Black	Nominated	
NAACP Image Awards	2019	Outstanding Actress in a Comedy Series	Orange Is the New Black	Nominated	
Primetime Emmy Awards	2014	Outstanding Guest Actress in a Comedy Series	Orange is the New Black (episode: "Lesbian Request Denied")	Won	
Primetime Emmy Awards	2015	Outstanding Supporting Actress in a Drama Series	Orange is the New Black (episode: "People Persons")	Won	
Primetime Emmy Awards	2017	Outstanding Supporting Actress in a Drama Series	Orange is the New Black (episode: "Hugs Can Be Deceiving")	Nominated	
Primetime Emmy Awards	2020	Outstanding Supporting Actress in a Limited Series or Movie	Mrs. America	Won	
Primetime Emmy Awards	2021	Outstanding Lead Actress in a Drama Series	In Treatment (episode: "Brooke — Week 5")	Nominated	
Primetime Emmy Awards	2025	Outstanding Lead Actress in a Comedy Series	The Residence	Nominated	
Screen Actors Guild Awards	2015	Outstanding Female Actor in a Comedy Series	Orange is the New Black	Won	
Screen Actors Guild Awards	2015	Outstanding Ensemble Cast in a Comedy Series	Orange is the New Black	Won	
Screen Actors Guild Awards	2016	Outstanding Female Actor in a Comedy Series	Orange is the New Black	Won	
Screen Actors Guild Awards	2016	Outstanding Ensemble Cast in a Comedy Series	Orange is the New Black	Won	
Screen Actors Guild Awards	2017	Outstanding Female Actor in a Comedy Series	Orange is the New Black	Nominated	
Screen Actors Guild Awards	2017	Outstanding Ensemble Cast in a Comedy Series	Orange is the New Black	Won	
Screen Actors Guild Awards	2018	Outstanding Female Actor in a Comedy Series	Orange is the New Black	Nominated	
Screen Actors Guild Awards	2018	Outstanding Ensemble Cast in a Comedy Series	Orange is the New Black	Nominated	
Screen Actors Guild Awards	2024	Outstanding Female Actor in a Miniseries or Television Movie	Painkiller	Nominated	
Tony Award	2022	Best Featured Actress in a Play	Clyde's	Nominated	
Outer Critics Circle Awards	2022	Outstanding Featured Actress in a Play	Clyde's	Won	
