= Moure =

Moure may refer to:

== Places ==
- Moure (Felgueiras), a parish in Felgueiras, Portugal
- Moure (Póvoa de Lanhoso), a parish in Póvoa de Lanhoso, Portugal
- Moure (Vila Verde), a parish in Vila Verde, Portugal
- Moure (Barcelos), a Portuguese parish

== People ==
- Erín Moure, Canadian poet of Galician descent
- Padre Jesus Santiago Moure, a Brazilian scientist who won the National Order of Scientific Merit for Biology
- Santiago Moure, a Colombian comedy actor
- Teresa Moure, a Galician writer
- Consuelo Moure, a Colombian actress from Pamplona
- Gloria Moure, a Spanish art historian, critic, curator and editor
- José María Cordovez Moure, a Colombian writer and historian

== See also ==
- LaMoure (disambiguation)
