= El Culebro: La historia de mi papá =

2017 documentary by Nicolás Casanova

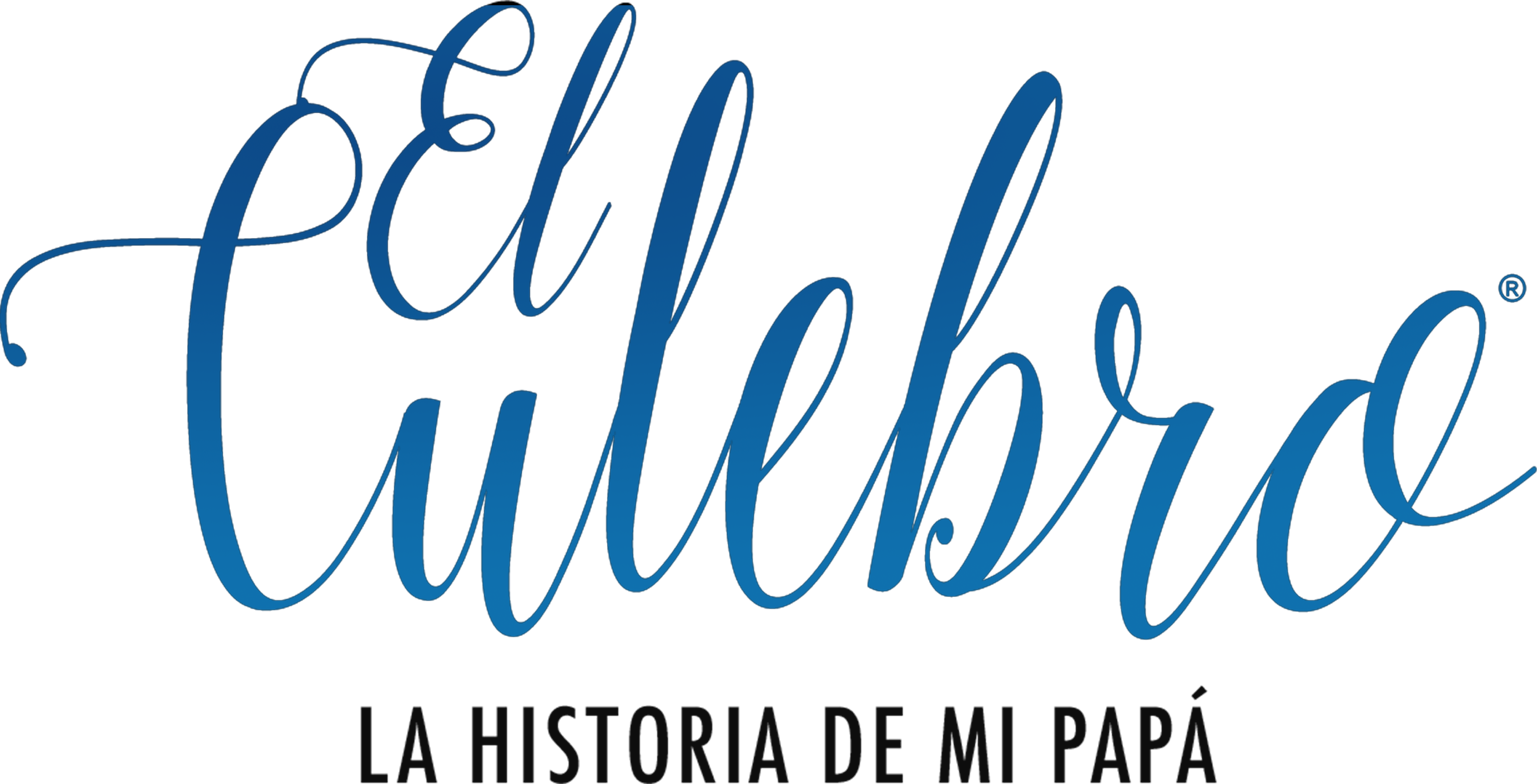
- Directed by: Nicolás Casanova
- Written by: Nicolás Casanova
- Produced by: Nicolás Casanova; Adriana Casanova; Rocío Casanova; María Margarita Casanova; Juan Sebastián Casanova; Gilma Sampayo
- Edited by: Nicolás Casanova
- Music by: Javier González Torrado
- Production company: Senic
- Release date: 2017
- Running time: 90 minutes
- Country: Colombia
- Language: Spanish

El Culebro: La historia de mi papá (English: El Culebro: My Father's story) is a Colombia documentary film written and directed by Nicolás Casanova. The film explores and re-build the life of actor Hernando Casanova in his early years, through to his years of success in perspective to his life as father. The film was produced by SENIC (Casanova's sons and daughters Production company). The film premiered on 20 September 2017, in Special Screenings section at the 2017 Festival Universitario Eureka.

== Synopsis ==
Hernando Casanova, a dreamer young man, travels to Bogotá following his dream: To become a TV star. He leaves behind his rough childhood spent in survive in a dysfunctional family. Three decades later, Nicolás, his youngest son, rebuild his father's legacy. He only has a few clues about Hernando: TV and movies footage, home movies, old family photos, newspapers, a diary and eight years lived with him.

== Contributors ==
The following are heavily contributed to the documentary throughout recorded interviews and archive footage;

- Hernando Casanova
- Pepe Sánchez, Film and TV Director.
- Héctor Ulloa, actor.
- Gloria Gómez, actress .
- Silvio Ángel, actor.
- Jimmy Salcedo, musician.
- Manolo Cardona, actor.
- Julián Román, actor.
- Harold Trompetero, Film and TV Director.
- Andrés Salgado, Writer and screenwriter.
- Martín de Francisco, Journalist..
- Santiago Moure, actor.
- Andrés López, comedian.
- Dago García, vice president production and content Canal Caracol.
- Carlos Benjumea, actor.
- Consuelo Luzardo, actress.
- Ligia Vidal Casanova, Sister.
- Eduardo Vidal Casanova, Brother.
- Gilma Sampayo, ex-Wife.
- Juan Sebastián Casanova, Son.
- Nicolás Casanova, Son.
- Elsa Ruíz, ex-Wife.
- Adriana Casanova, daughter.
- Rocío Casanova, daughter.
- María Margarita Casanova, daughter.
- Carlos Muñoz, actor.
- Carlos Sánchez, Film and TV director of photography.
- Javier Mejía, Film and TV Director.
- Claudio Soto, musician.
- Wilson Viveros, musician.
- Willy Newball, musician.

== Production ==
On 1 May 2015, it was announced that director Nicolás Casanova and Senic, were making a film about actor Hernando Casanova. It was revealed that the film would be with a lot of unseen footage and music of Casanova. Nicolás Casanova stated: "Everyone knows his life as an artist. But many people do not know his private life, and the idea is to tell how my dad, coming from a very humble family, came to Bogota, and managed to enter the television and be who was".

== Music ==
The documentary features various tracks Casanova had completed in 1982, during Romantico también LP.
