= List of universities in Bogotá =

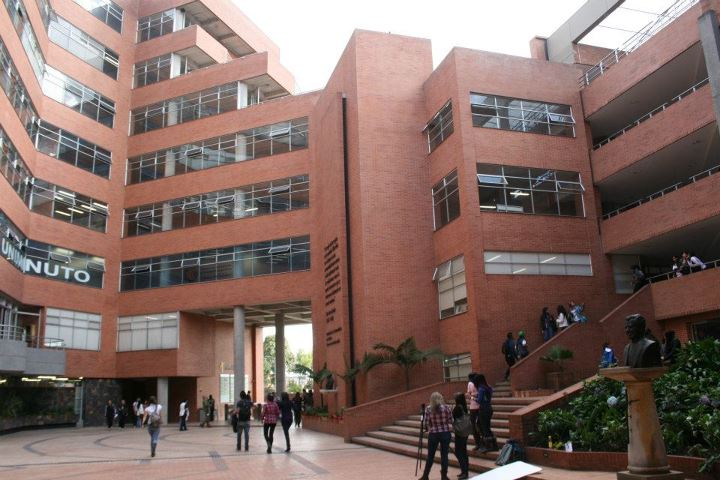
UNIMINUTO

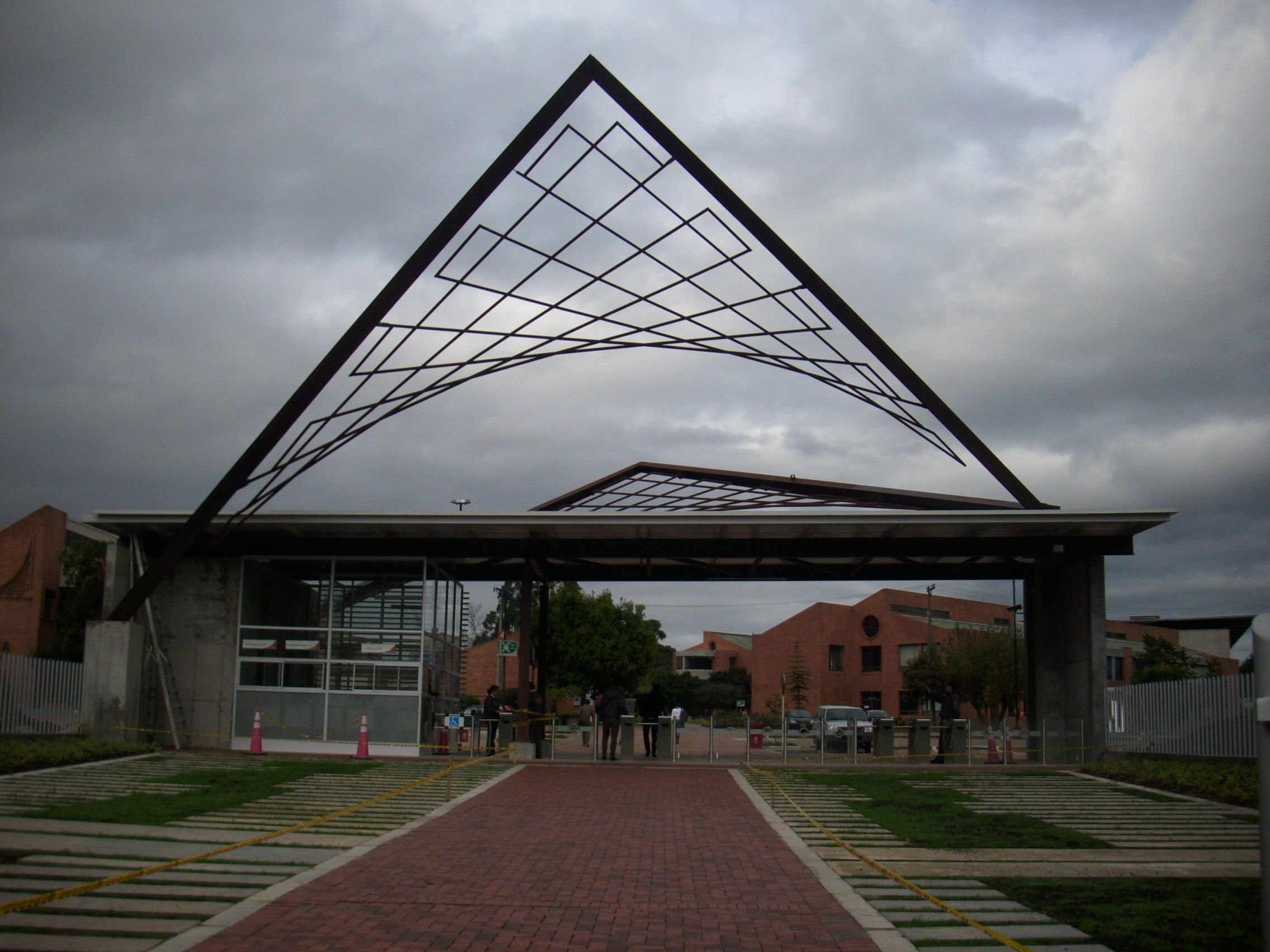
ECI

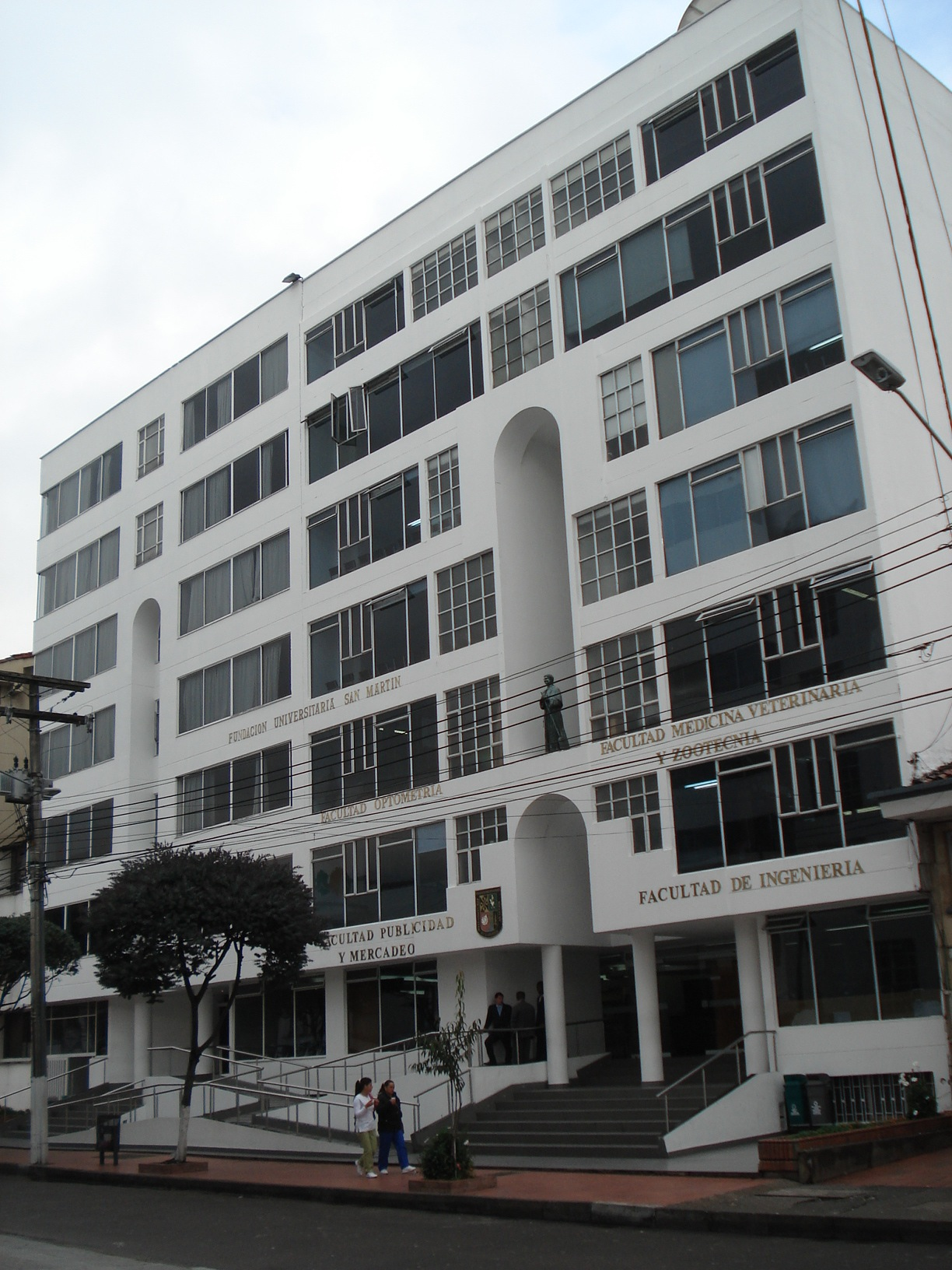
Universidad de San Martín

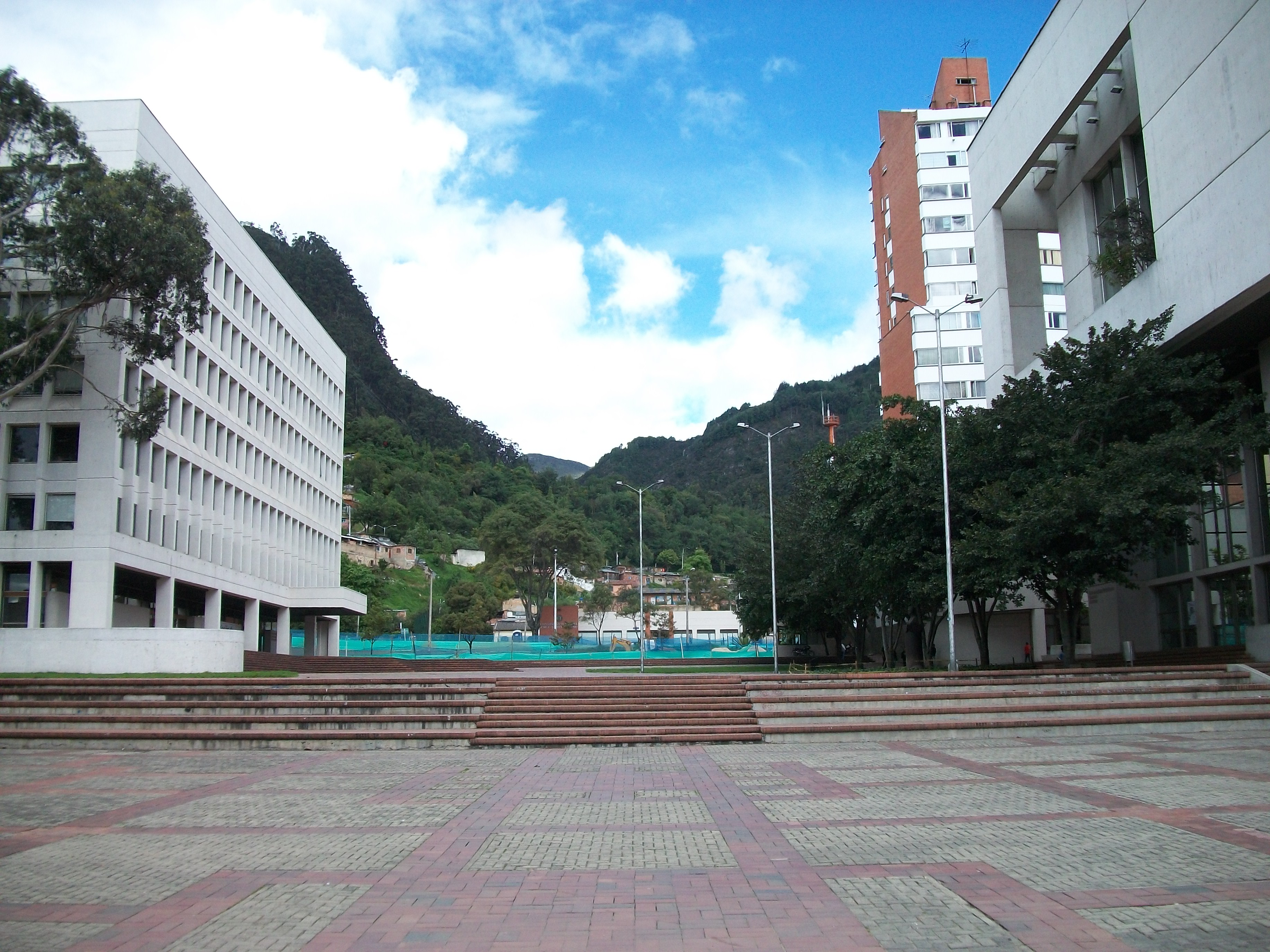
Universidad Jorge Tadeo Lozano

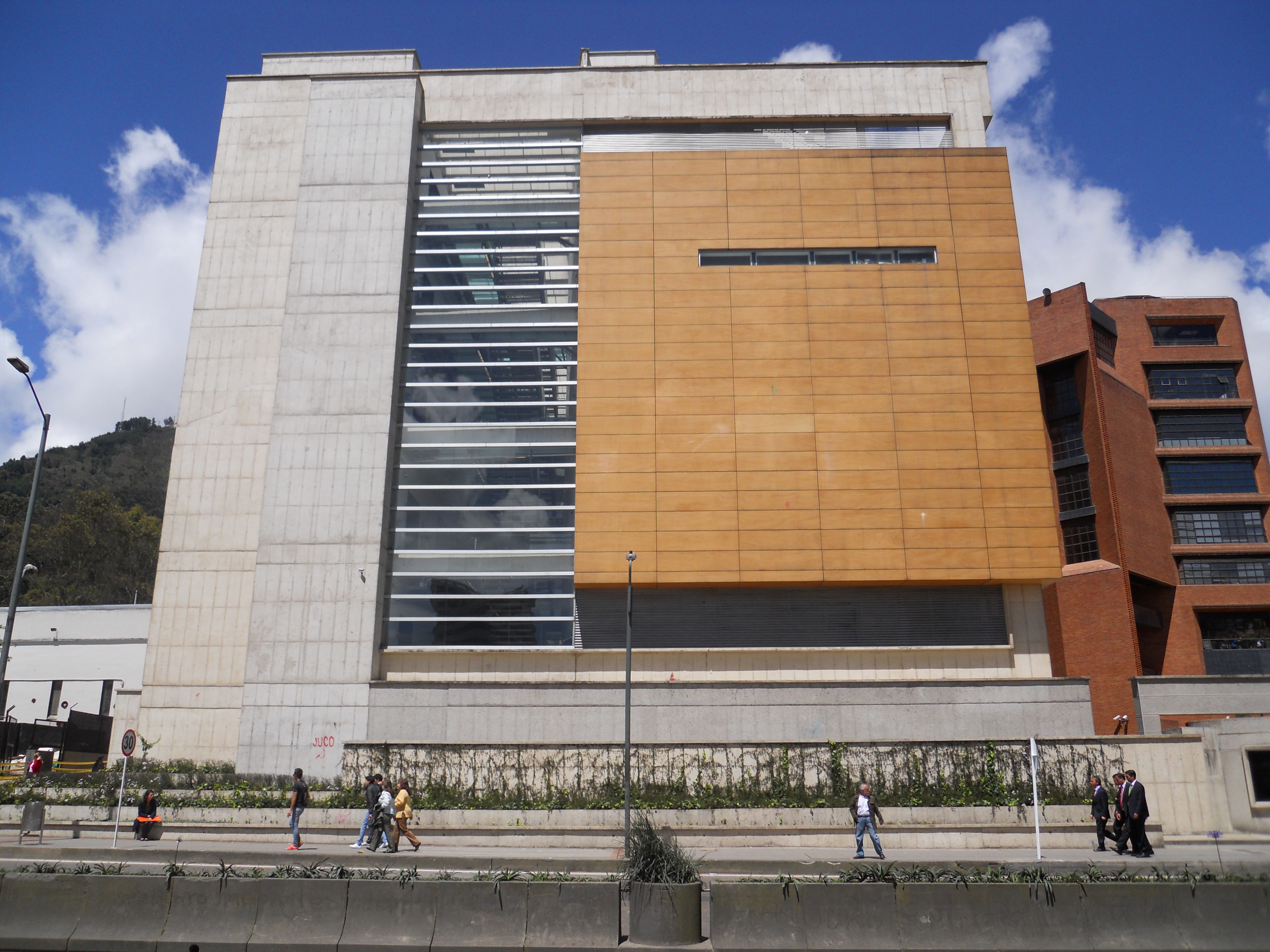
Universidad La Javeriana

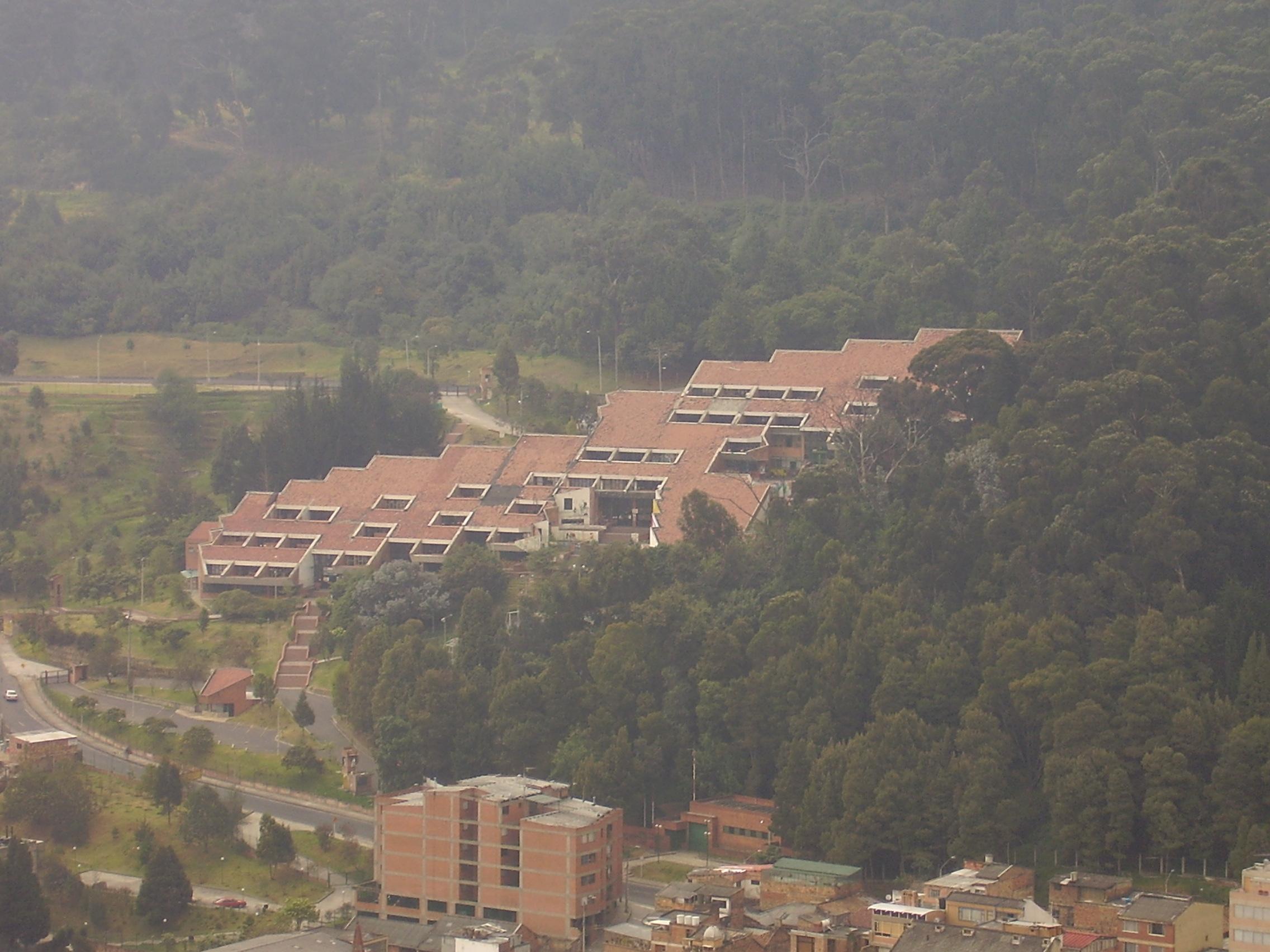
La Macarena Campus, Universidad Distrital Francisco José de Caldas

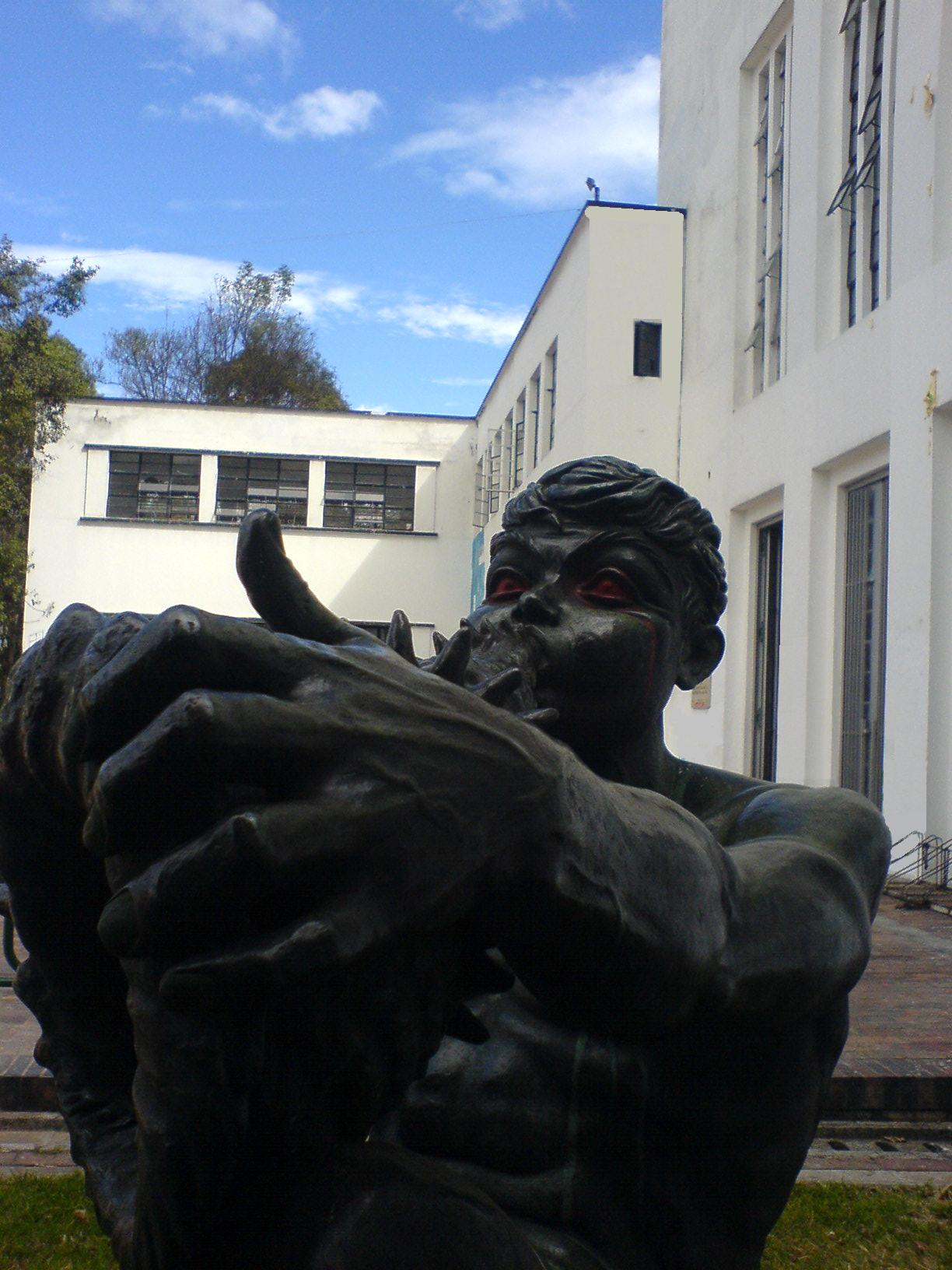
Beaux Arts Building at National University

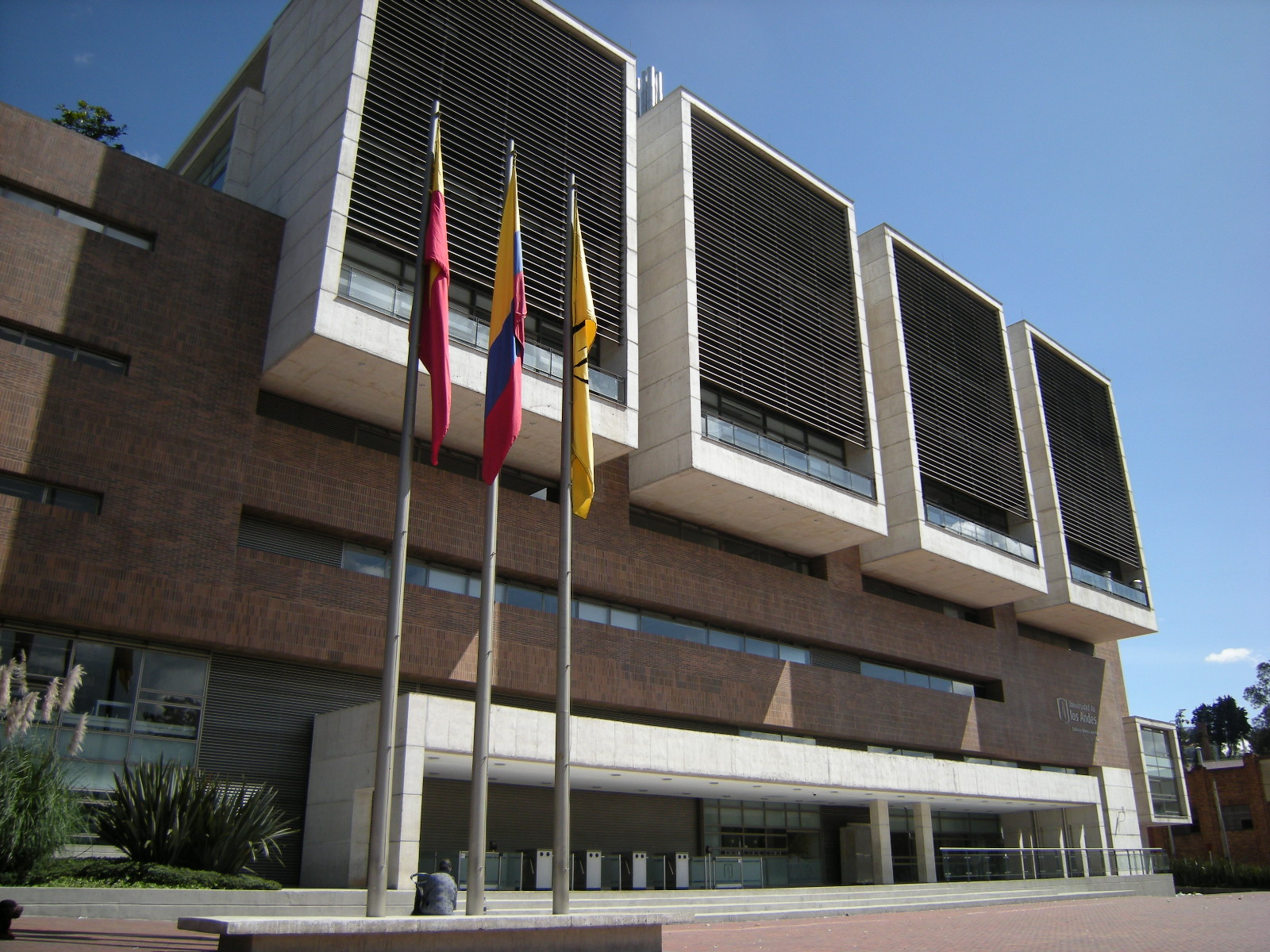
Universidad de Los Andes

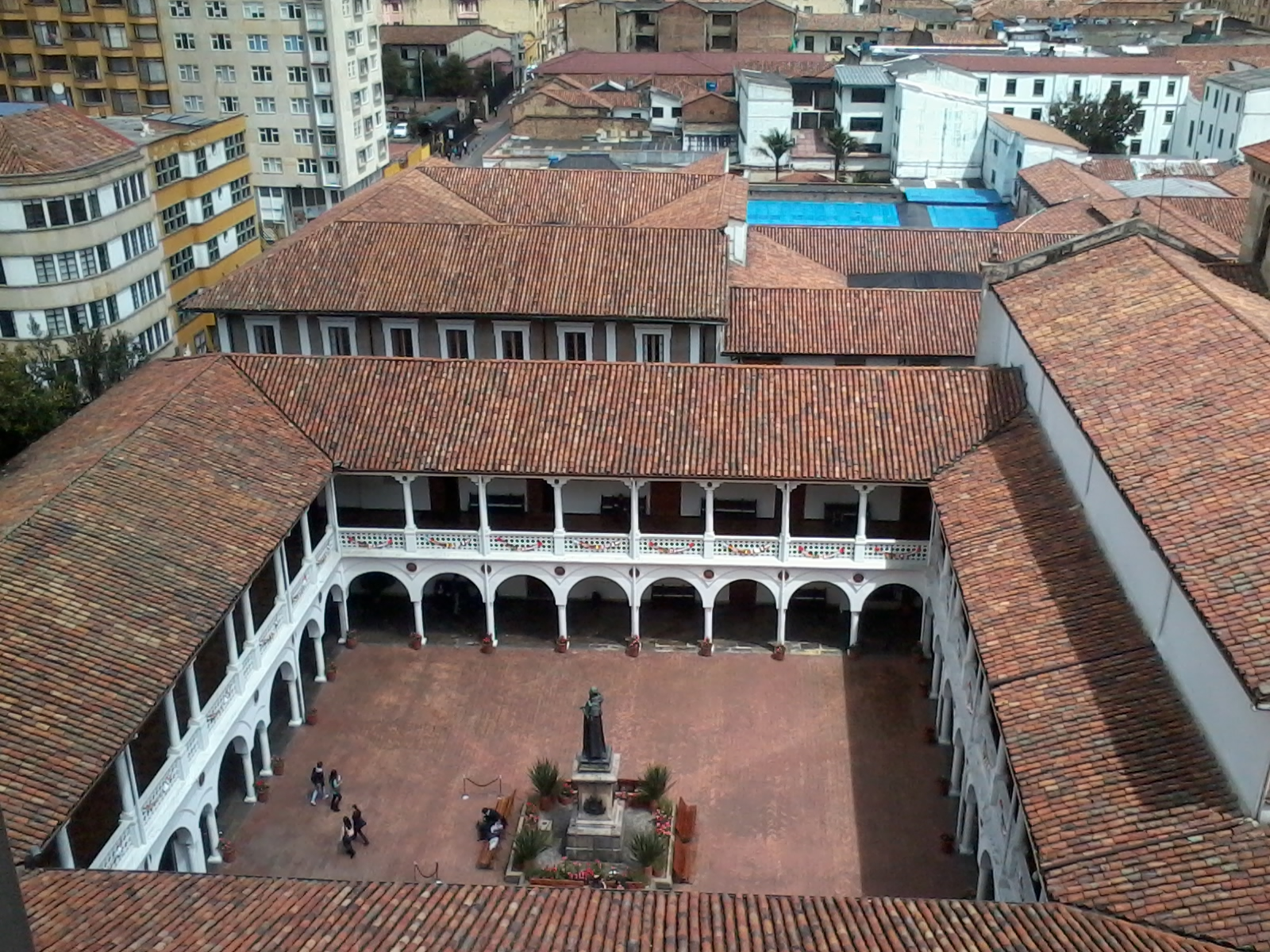
Universidad del Rosario

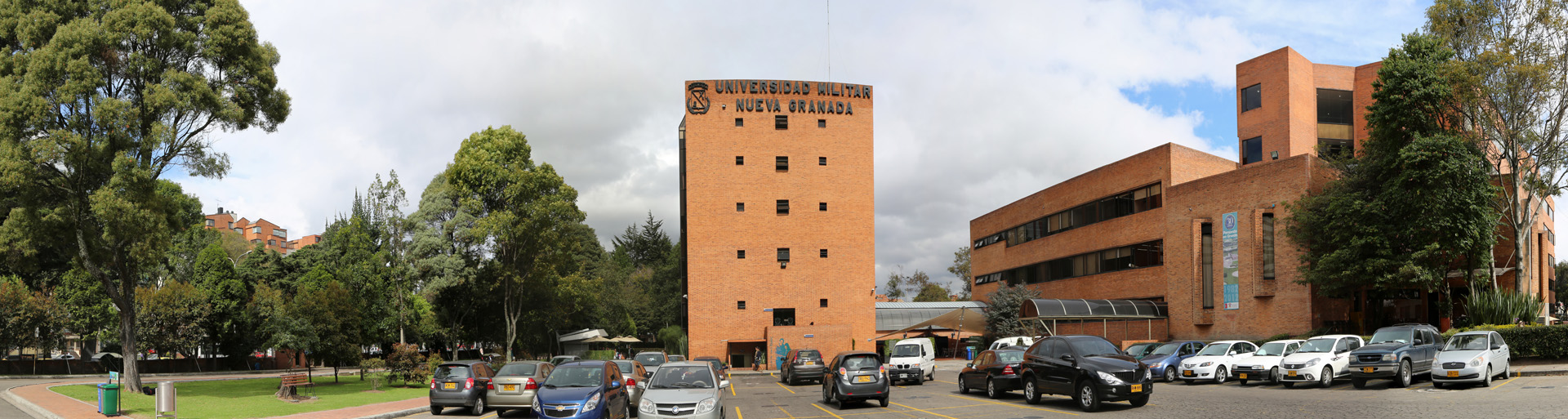
Universidad Militar Nueva Granada

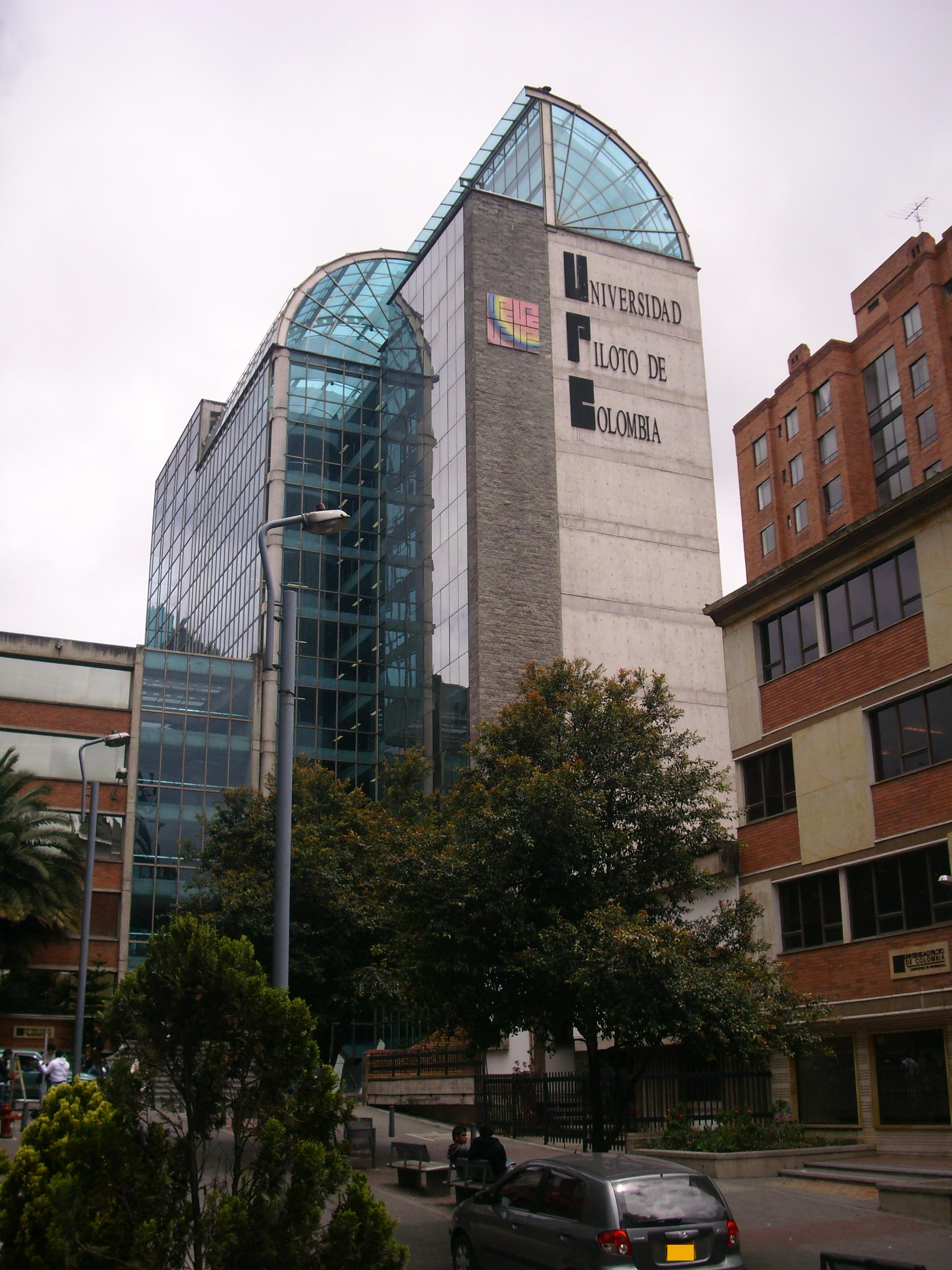
Universidad Piloto de Colombia

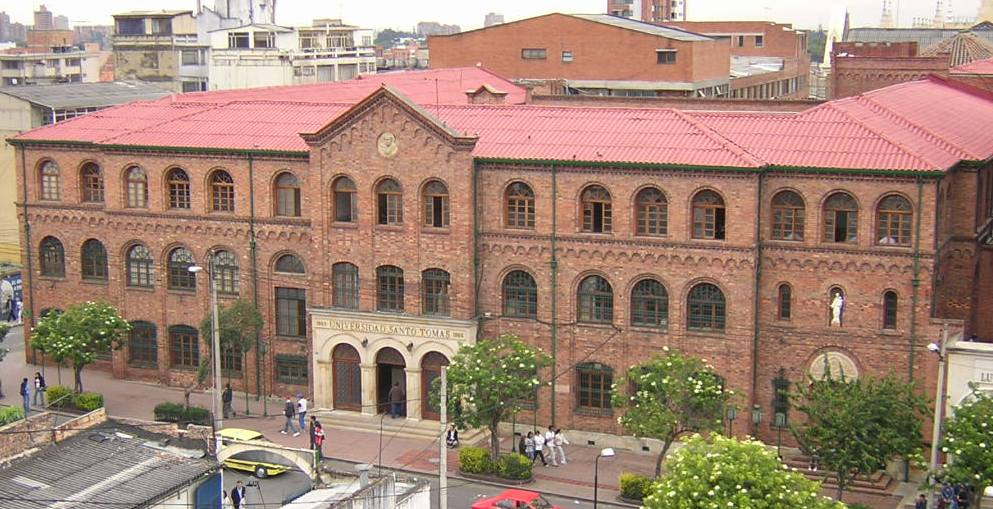
Universidad Santo Tomás

This list contains the universities and other institutions of tertiary education in Bogotá. The first university opened in Bogotá was Universidad Santo Tomás, on July 13, 1580, just 41 years after the Spanish foundation of the city. The Universidad Santo Tomás belongs to the religious Dominican order.

The second university of the city was opened on July 9, 1623, by the Jesuits with the name Universidad San Francisco Javier, which later on changed its name to Pontificia Universidad Javeriana. Its original facilities are part of the Museum of Colonial Art of Bogotá.

On December 31, 1651, the School of Our Lady of Rosary was founded by Fray Cristóbal de Torres. It still works today in its foundational site.

In 1867, the largest university of the country, the National University of Colombia is founded, consolidating Bogotá as the University Capital of Colombia.

On February 15, 1886, the Externado University of Colombia is founded by jurist and educator Nicolás Pinzón Warlosten.

On November 16, 1948; the first nonsectarian university in Colombia, the University of the Andes was founded by Mario Laserna Pinzón. In 2026, the University of the Andes was ranked the number one university in Colombia and the fourteenth in Latin America by U.S. News & World Report.

Bogotá's colleges and universities have had a major impact on the city and region's economy. Not only are they major employers, but they also attract national and international students. The large pool of professionals they graduate bring industries to the city and the surrounding region. Bogotá is Colombia's educational "Mecca"; it boasts more schools, colleges, and universities than any other city in Colombia.

== List of universities ==
There are more than one hundred tertiary education institutions in Bogotá alone. Following is a list of the most important ones:

1. Centro Bolivariano de Educación Superior - Corbes
2. Centro de Estudios COOTRADIAN
3. Colegio de Estudios Superiores de Administración - CESA
4. Colegio Mayor de Cundinamarca
5. Colegio Odontológico Colombiano
6. Colegio Superior de Telecomunicaciones
7. Corporación Centro de Estudios Artísticos y Ténicos - CEART
8. Corporación Centro de Nuestra Señora de las Mercedes
9. Corporación Universitaria Cenda - CENDA
10. Corporación de Educación Superior - UNITEC
11. Corporación Educativa AES
12. Corporación Escuela de Artes y Letras
13. Corporación Escuela de Diseños Industriales - ACADITEC
14. Corporación Instituto Superior de Educación Social - ISES
15. Corporación Instituto Tecnológico de la Seguridad - INTESEG
16. Corporación Internacional para el Desarrollo Educativo - CIDE
17. Corporación Instituto Colombo Alemán para la Formación Tecnológica - ICAFT
18. Corporación Educativa Taller 5 Centro de Diseño
19. Corporación John F. Kennedy
20. Corporación para el Desarrollo Social Antonio Nariño - CORPDESAN
21. Corporación Técnica de Colombia - CORPOTEC
22. Corporación Tecnológica Industrial Colombiana
23. Corporación Tecnológica de Bogotá
24. Corporación Unificada Nacional de Educación Superior - CUN
25. Corporación Universal de Investigación y Tecnología - CORUNIVERSITEC
26. Corporación Universitaria de Ciencia y Desarrollo
27. Corporación Universitaria de Ciencias Aplicadas y Ambientales - UDCA
28. Corporación Universitaria de Colombia Ideas
29. Corporación Universitaria Iberoamericana
30. Corporación Universitaria Minuto de Dios - UNIMINUTO
31. Corporación Universitaria Nueva Colombia
32. Corporación Universitaria Republicana
33. Escuela Colombiana de Carreras Industriales - ECCI
34. Escuela Colombiana de Diseño
35. Escuela Colombiana de Hotelería y Turismo - ECOTET
36. Escuela Colombiana de Ingeniería Julio Garavito - ECI
37. Escuela Colombiana de Rehabilitación
38. Escuela de Administración de Negocios - EAN
39. Escuela de Arte y Diseño de Arquitectura e Ingeniería
40. Escuela Internacional de Diseño y Comercio La Salle
41. Escuela Superior de Administración Pública - ESAP
1. Escuela Superior de Empresa,Ingenieria y Técnologia - ESEIT
1. Escuela Superior de Oftalmología, Instituto Barraquer de América
2. Fundación Centro de Educación Superior, Investigación y Profesionalización - CEDINPRO
3. Fundación Centro de Investigación, Docencia y Consultoría Administrativa - CIDCA
4. Fundación Centro de Investigación y Estudios Odontológicos - CIEO
5. Fundación de Educación Superior - ESATEC
6. Fundación de Educación Superior Nueva América
7. Fundación de Educación Superior San José - FESSANJOSE
8. Fundación Escuela Superior Profesional - INPAHU
9. Fundación Eurocolombiana de Educación Superior
10. Fundación Instituto Superior de Carreras Técnicas - INSUTEC
11. Fundación Interamericana Técnica - FIT
12. Fundación para la Educación Superior Real de Colombia
13. Fundación para la Educación Superior San Mateo
14. Fundación Tecnológica Autónoma de Bogotá - FABA
15. Fundación Tecnológica de Madrid, Cundinamarca
16. Fundación Tecnológica San Francisco de Asís
17. Fundación Universidad Central de Colombia
18. Fundación Universitaria Agraria de Colombia
19. Fundación Universitaria Ciencias de la Salud
20. Fundación Universitaria del Area Andina
21. Fundación Universitaria Empresarial de la Camara de Comercio de Bogotá
22. Fundación Universitaria Iberoamericana - FUNIBER
23. Fundacion Universitaria Juan N. Corpas
24. Fundación Universitaria Konrad Lorenz
25. Fundación Universitaria Los Libertadores
26. Fundación Universitaria Manuela Beltrán
27. Fundación Universitaria Monserrate
28. Fundación Universitaria Panamericana
29. Fundación Universitaria Sanitas
30. Fundación Universitaria San Alfonso
31. Fundación Universitaria San Martín
32. Improvisatec
33. Instituto de Ciencias de la Salud - CES
34. Instituto Nacional de Telecomunicaciones - INSTEL
35. Instituto Técnico Central La Salle
36. Institución Tecnológica de Educación Superior - ICSEF
37. Institucion Universitaria Colombo Americana - UNICA
38. Institucion Universitaria Unión Latina - UNILATINA
39. Jorge Tadeo Lozano University
40. Politécnico Colombo Andino
41. Institución Universitaria Politécnico Grancolombiano
42. Politécnico Internacional
43. Pontificia Universidad Javeriana
44. Servicio Nacional de Aprendizaje - SENA
45. Universidad de Bogotá Jorge Tadeo Lozano
46. Universidad de San Buenaventura
47. Universidad Distrital Francisco José de Caldas
48. Universidad Antonio Nariño
49. Universidad Autónoma de Colombia
50. Universidad Católica de Colombia
51. Universidad Central
52. Universidad Cooperativa de Colombia
53. Universidad de América
54. Universidad de Cundinamarca
55. Universidad de La Sabana
56. Universidad de La Salle
57. Universidad de Los Andes
58. Universidad del Bosque
59. Universidad Sergio Arboleda
60. Universidad del Rosario
61. Universidad Externado de Colombia
62. Universidad Incca de Colombia
63. Universidad La Gran Colombia
64. Universidad Libre
65. Universidad Manuela Beltrán
66. Universidad Militar Nueva Granada
67. Universidad Nacional Abierta y a Distancia - UNAD
68. Universidad Nacional de Colombia
69. Universidad Pedagógica Nacional
70. Universidad Pedagógica y Tecnológica de Colombia
71. Universidad Piloto de Colombia
72. Universidad Santo Tomás de Aquino

== See also ==
- List of universities in Colombia
