= Amor a mil =

- Created by: Natalia Ospina; Andrés Salgado
- Starring: Manolo Cardona; Patricia Vásquez; Luís Fernando Hoyos; Margarita Ortega; Hernando Casanova; Julio César Luna; Gloria Gómez
- Country of origin: Colombia
- Original language: Spanish
- No. of episodes: 124

Production
- Producer: Mauricio Ruíz
- Production location: Bogotá
- Running time: 45 minutes

Original release
- Network: Caracol TV
- Release: 2001

Amor a mil (Love to a Thousand) is a Colombian telenovela which starred Manolo Cardona, Patricia Vásquez, Luís Fernando Hoyos, Margarita Ortega, Hernando Casanova, Julio César Luna and Gloria Gómez. It was produced and broadcast on Caracol TV in 2001. This telenovela contains 124 episodes.

== Cast ==
- Manolo Cardona .... John Héctor Afanador
- Patricia Vásquez .... Alejandra Guerrero
- Margarita Ortega .... Magnolia Guzmán
- Luis Fernando Hoyos .... Gabriel Ferrara
- Carlos Humberto Camacho .... Enrique Guerrero
- Julio César Luna .... Augusto Guerrero
- Gloria Gómez .... Julia de Afanador
- Hernando Casanova .... Vicente Secretario
- Karen Martinez .... Diana McKenzie
- Fernando Arévalo .... Roberto Gordillo
- Patricia Polanco .... Mila de Ferrara
- Javier Gnneco .... Manuel Guzmán
- Consuelo Moure .... Miryam de Guerrero
- Julián Román .... Kevin Abelardo McKenzie
- Joavany Álvarez .... Camilo Yucatán
- Claudia Arroyave .... Isabel Afanador
- Alejandra Dominguez Jurado .... Laisa
- John Ceballos .... Gerardo "Geraldine"
- Julio Escallón .... Mario Francisco 'Pacho' Jaimes
- Álvaro Lemmon .... Jesús McKenizie
- Andrés Martínez .... Sebastián Yucatán
- Luis Alfredo Velasco .... Gustavo
- Felipe Galorfe
- Lincoln Palomeque
