= Antón Pulido =

- Born: 25 September 1944; San Paio de Bóveda de Amoeiro, Spain
- Died: 11 September 2026 (aged 81); Vigo, Spain
- Known for: painting and graphic art
- Awards: Trasalba Prize (2015)

Antón Pulido Novoa, (Born 25 September in Bóveda de Amoeiro, Amoeiro, died 11 September 2026) was a Spanish painter, engraver, and cultural manager.

== Biography ==
The son of a schoolteacher in Bóveda de Amoeiro, he began studying at the seminary in Orense before going to Barcelona, where he studied Fine Arts, specializing in painting and engraving. His first exhibition took place at the Ateneo of Orense (1971); later he published three portfolios of engravings in three series entitled O home, O abrazo and A espera (1978, 1979 and 1981, respectively). In the 1980s his career continued with various individual and collective exhibitions, while he also got a job as a secondary school drawing teacher, settling in Vigo. He continued his work as an engraver and book illustrator, especially designing the covers for books published by Ir Indo. During this time, he was appointed Director General of Culture for the Regional Government of Galicia. Years later, in the 1990s, he was the first director of the Galician Center of Contemporary Art (1993–1994), a position in which he was replaced by the art critic Gloria Moure.

Pulido died on 11 September 2026, at the age of 81.

== Awards ==
- He was named Favorite Son of Amoeiro (Spanish: Hijo Predilecto de Amoeiro) in 2008.
- Galicia Critics' Prize (Spanish: Premio de la Crítica de Galicia) in Plastic and Visual Arts. (2014, XXXVII edition)
- Trasalba Prize, in 2015.
- Vigués distinguido (transl. Distinguished Vigo Native) in 2006.

== Bibliography ==
- Vigo City Council and Distinguished Vigueses Foundation: Vigueses distinguidos. 1985-2011, 2012, Vigo: Ir Indo. p. 170. ISBN 978-84-7680-690-6
