= Mouret =

Mouret may refer to:

- Mouret, Aveyron, a town in France
- Le Mouret, a municipality in the canton of Fribourg, Switzerland
- Lissac-et-Mouret, a commune in the Lot department, France

== People with the surname ==
- Cédric Mouret (born 1978), French footballer
- Hélène Conway-Mouret (born 1960), French politician
- Jacques François Mouret (1780–1837), French chess player
- Jean-Joseph Mouret (1682-1738), French composer best known for his Fanfare-Rondeau used as the theme for the television series Masterpiece
- Roland Mouret (born 1962), French fashion designer

== See also ==
- Masterpiece (formerly Masterpiece Theatre)
- Moure (disambiguation)
