= Foundation University =

Foundation University may refer to:

- Foundation University (Philippines), in Dumaguete
- Foundation University Islamabad, Pakistan
- Foundation University of Health Sciences, Bogota, Colombia
