= Kuzmanić =

Kuzmanić is a surname. The Croatian census of 2011 listed it as one of the most common surnames in Okrug, Croatia.

Notable people with the surname include:

- Ante Kuzmanić, a Croatian physician and journalist
- Slavica Kuzmanić, a Croatian volleyball player

== See also ==
- Dunav Kuzmanich
