= Dunav Kuzmanich =

Colombian actor and director (1945–2002)

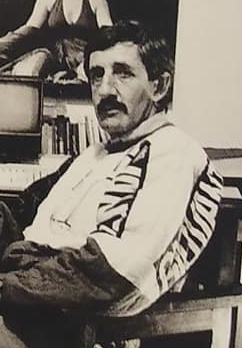
- Born: Dunav Kuzmanich Salinas; 4 July 1935; Santiago, Chile
- Died: 9 August 2008 (aged 63); Santa Fe de Antioquia, Colombia
- Occupations: Director, screenwriter
- Years active: 1963–2008
- Spouse: Isabel Sánchez Méndez (m. 1969, divorced)

Dunav Kuzmanich Salinas (4 July 1935 – 9 August 2008) was a Chilean filmmaker, screenwriter, and writer based in Colombia. His discreet way of life, almost in anonymity, coupled with the censorship his work faced, led him to become a cult director and one of the most important figures in Colombian cinema.

For nearly three decades, Kuzmanich's films attempted to depict the complex and violent historical events of the second half of the 20th century in Colombia. Some of his films stand out for their chronic storytelling, descriptive nature, and elements of protest, such as Canaguaro (1981), La Agonía del Difunto (1982), Ajuste de cuentas (1983), and El día de las Mercedes (1985). As a screenwriter, two of the films he wrote for (San Antoñito and A Man of Principle) made it to the Cannes Film Festival, with the latter being the first Colombian fiction film to achieve this feat. He also worked on television series like Don Chinche (1982), which was recognized as one of the most important of the 20th century in Colombia.

In his later years, he dedicated his time to teaching his methods at various universities in Colombia, particularly in Medellín, where he developed a significant body of cinematic work. After his death, the Dunav Kuzmanich Corporation was founded in Medellín to preserve his memory and disseminate his working methods. The corporation consists of more than thirty audiovisual creators, film and television professors, visual artists, actors, social communicators, and journalists.

== Filmography ==
All of Kuzmanich's films share several common elements: their themes, the stance he took towards them, the ideological commitment, his conception of the language of cinema, and the presence of Hernando Casanova, as his iconic actor, whom he regarded as a highly talented actor and a dear friend.

| Year | Title | Role | Notes |
|---|---|---|---|
| 1981 | Canaguaro | Director | —Best Film Nominee — Three Continents Festival (Nantes, Francia) —Special Mention — Festival Internacional de nuevo cine Latinoamericano (La habana, Cuba) — Official Selection - Cartagena Film Festival (Colombia) |
| 1982 | La Agonía del Difunto | Director | — Official Selection - Cartagena Film Festival (Colombia) — Honorable Mention - Thessaloniki International Film Festival (Greece) |
| 1984 | A Man of Principle | Writer | — Critics' Week / Cannes Film Festival (France) |
| 1983 | Ajuste de Cuentas | Director | |
| 1985 | El Día de las Mercedes | Director | |
| 1986 | Mariposas S.A. | Director | |
| 1986 | San Antoñito | Writer | — Bogotá Film Festival (Colombia) — Critics' Week / Cannes Film Festival (France) |
| 1996 | La Nave de los Sueños | Writer | — Jury Prize - Festival Andino de Cuzco (Peru) — Official Selection - Festival de los mundos Latinos de Arcachon (France) — Best Script - San Juan Cinemafest (San Juan, Puerto Rico) — Jury Prize - Oslo Film Festival |
