= Nicolás Casanova =

Colombian filmmaker

Nicolas Casanova
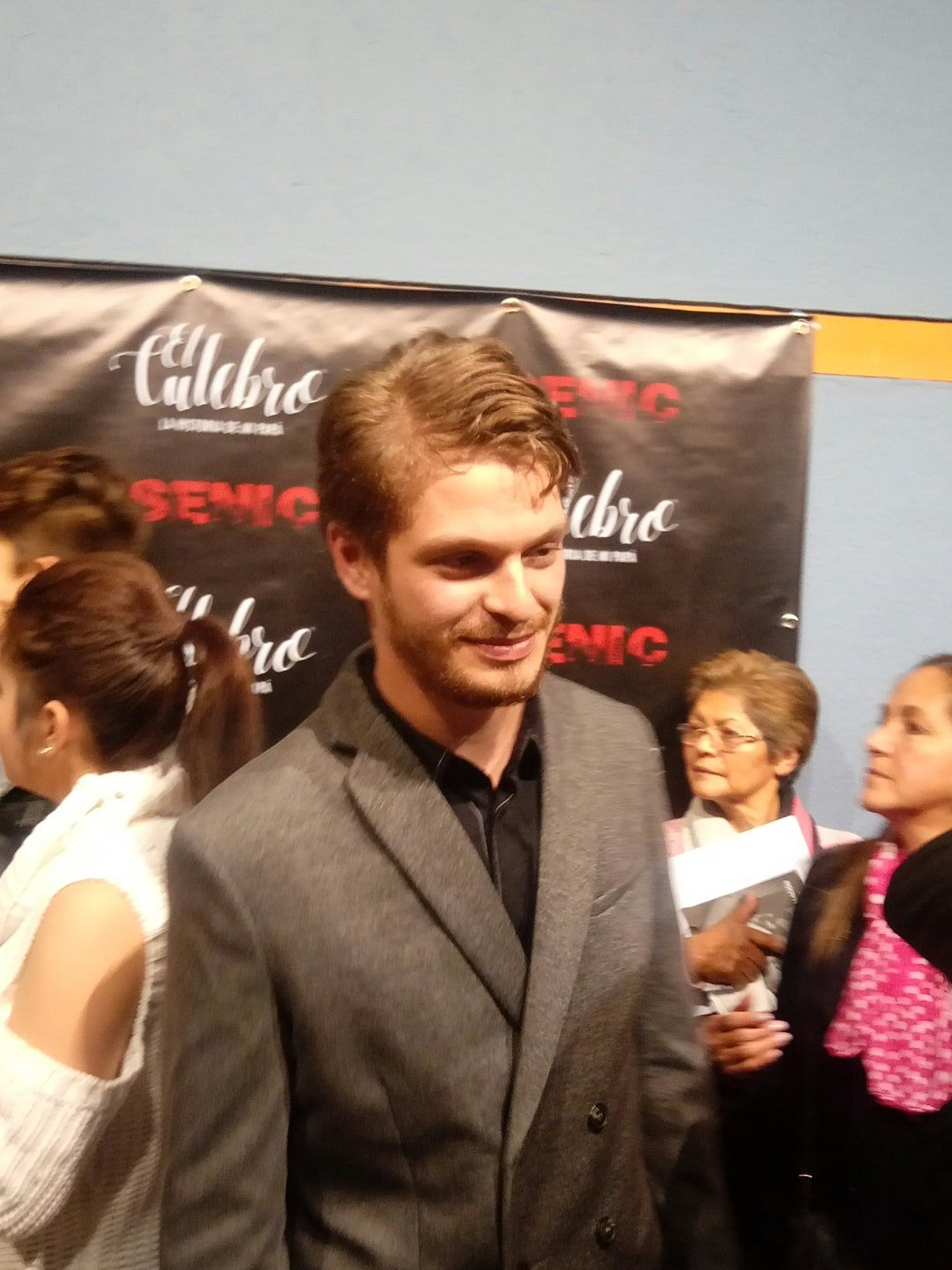
- Casanova in 2017
- Born: Javier Nicolás Casanova Sampayo; November 22, 1993; Bogotá, Colombia
- Education: Universidad Jorge Tadeo Lozano
- Occupation: Filmmaker
- Years active: 2017–present

Javier Nicolás Casanova Sampayo (born November 22, 1993) is a Colombian-American filmmaker. He has been member of the Colombian Academy of Cinematography Arts and Sciences since 2020.

His first feature-documentary, El Culebro: La historia de mi papá (2017), is a tribute to his father, actor Hernando Casanova. After several screenings, it premiered on Caracol Televisión, and become one of the most watched documentary that day in Colombia.

== Biography ==
Nicolás Casanova was born in 1993 in Bogotá, Colombia. He is the youngest son of Colombian actor Hernando Casanova and journalist Gilma Sampayo. He has four siblings: Juan Sebastián, Adriana (1970-2019), Rocío and Margarita. He studied Film and Television at the Jorge Tadeo Lozano University in Colombia.

== Career ==
Nicolas Casanova debuted in cinema producing, editing and directing the feature-documentary El Culebro: La historia de mi papá (2017). The film was called "A cornerstone to learn about the history of one of the most important figures on colombian television" and "A true and experienced work despite being produced by a young director" and "(Nicolas) is one of the outstanding directors from Bogotá".

== Filmography ==
- 2017 – El Culebro: La historia de mi papá (Documentary)

EUREKA Film Festival - World Premiere
Festival Villa del Cine - Out of Competition
XIX Festival de Cine de Santa Fe de Antioquia - Official Selection
Festival de Cine de Oriente - Official Selection

== Awards and recognitions ==
- Outstanding directors from Bogotá - Revista GO (2018)
