= Margarita Ortega (actress) =

Colombian television presenter and actress

Margarita Ortega Cadavid
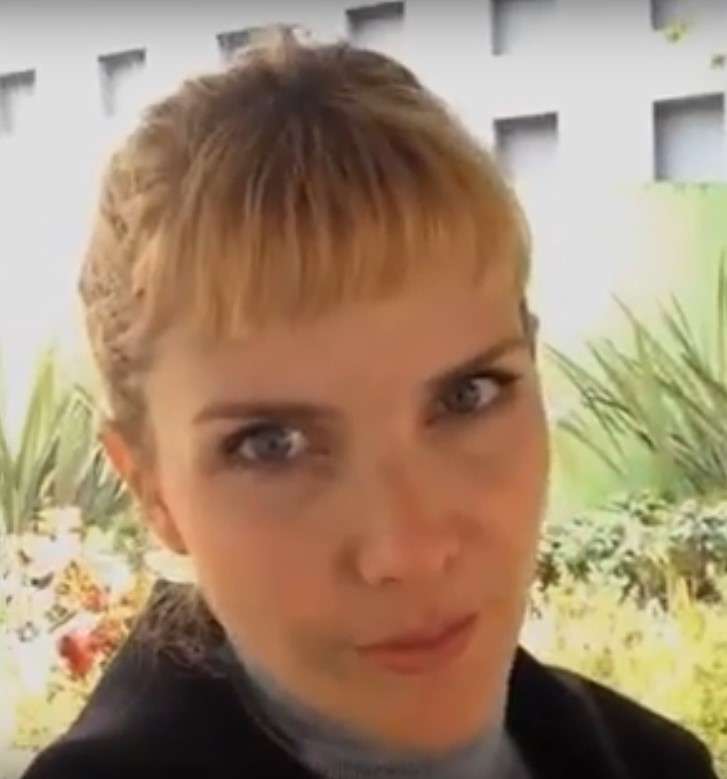
- Margarita Ortega in 2014
- Born: January 19, 1973 (age 53); Santiago de Cali, Colombia
- Occupations: television presenter, actress
- Years active: 1993—present
- Spouse: Ramiro Meneses (m. 2000; div. 2015)
- Partner: Joan Avellaneda
- Children: Emiliano (1996); Melibea (2004)
- Parents: Rodrigo Alonso Ortega (father); Marta Lucía Cadavid (mother)

Margarita Ortega (born January 19, 1973) is a Colombian television presenter and actress.

== Career ==
Ortega studied Social Communications and Journalism at the Liberators University in Bogotá. She made her debut as an actress in the 1993 soap opera Behind an Angel. Between 1995 and 1997 she was an anchor in the 7:30 p.m. news program on Caracol Televisión alongside María Lucía Fernández. Following this she appeared in several soap operas, movies, and plays. In 2002 she returned to Caracol news as the presenter of the entertainment section. In 2007 she presented the program Culturama on the state television channel Señal Colombia.

== Personal life ==
In 2010, she married actor Ramiro Meneses in a ceremony attended only by close family members and friends. The couple separated in 2015.

== Television ==
- The Santisimas (2015)
- Rosario Tijeras (2010)
- La quiero a morir (Love her to death) (2008–2009)
- Montecristo (2007)
- Without shame (2007)
- Deception (2006)
- Seven times beloved (2002)
- Lucifer is visiting (2001)
- Love thousand (2001)
- Not Love, Just Frenzy (2001)
- Man and wife (1999)
- God bless (1998)
- The calm waters (1994)
- Behind an angel (1993)

== Films ==
- Ceiba, the Hour of the devil (2002)
- The teacher (2002)
- Bolivar I am (2001)
- Before the rain (2000)
- Double standard (2000)
