= Colombian comedy =

Colombian Comedy is comedy made in Colombia or by Colombians outside of Colombia. Although Colombia does not have a tradition of comedy and comedians compared to other Spanish speaking countries such as Mexico or Spain, it still has important features that makes it distinctive.

== History ==
According to German Rey, a student of the subject, there are historically important defining moments in Colombian comedy.

=== 50s ===
Colombian comedy's original birthplace is the radio since this was the first original mass media with wide coverage of the national territory rendering radio a very important medium for the promotion of comedy. A distinctive representative of Colombian comedy on the radio and who was praised by generations even before television became popular was Colombian comedian Gullermo Zuluaga, better known by his stage name Montecristo. Although initially a man who intended to become a singer Montecristo decided to try his luck when he asked for an opportunity to tell a joke on the Colombian station Culture Radio Radio Cultura in the city of Cali during the show The Variety Hour, by telling the following joke:

A gringo says to a man from Antioquia "in my country there are people so fast that once a man threw a coin from the top of the Empire State building and went running downstairs and he was able to catch it with his hand" to what the man from Antioquia replies "that's a fast man, but I have a brother who is even faster. The other day he started running around a column so fast that he would poke himself in the back so he would get out of the way"

After this Montecristo became successful and was offered to work with Colombia's biggest station originally he worked for the station "The Voice of Antioquia" which later on would become Caracol Radio

=== 60s and early 70s ===
Colombia saw the birth of television in 1954. Colombian president, General Gustavo Rojas Pinilla, started the project of bringing television as a major media after a trip to Germany where he found the device almost by accident, since he had traveled to Europe to buy ammunition and weapons for Colombia, which at the time was involved in a war against Peru. Impressed by the technological advance, General Pinilla dreamed of having Colombians using the new device. Comedy appeared almost a decade later with the comedy Yo y Tú (I and You)

Yo y Tú became the starting point of comedy. Featuring Carlos Muñoz, Yo y Tú depicted a traditional family from Bogotá and the different relationships of family and friends. The comedy reflected the traditional life of Colombian women and to some degree the innocence of society in the late 1950s.

=== Late 70s and 80s ===
Colombian television has not been prolific in the production of comedy shows compared to developed countries with a strong tradition of comedy. Colombian media has usually provided itself with material by purchasing dubbed American comedies also known locally as "enlatados" (which means "canned", as in canned food).

During the late 1970s a new production called Don Chinche started to be broadcast on national television, which at the time was still wholly owned by the government.

Don Chinche (Which could be translated as "Mr. Crab Louse") depicted the traditional low-medium class family and its relationships to the "barrio" (neighbourhood). It relied on the use of odd circumstances in which the characters got involved. Don Chinche, represented by Héctor Ulloa, was the owner of a car shop where different situations occurred.

The show was the starting point of satiric comedy in Colombia. In many episodes the story represented social problems and it was used as a way to criticize the government.

Cast for Don Chinche (1985)

- Hernando Casanova
- Gloria Gomez
- Delfina Guido
- Paula Peña

Because of its regional isolation, Colombian comedy in the media did not properly portrayed people from backgrounds different from the Andean region.Don Chinche for instance did not depict people from other cities or with a different accents. Given the fact that this show was intended to have a national audience people in other cities of Colombia would reasonably expect to be portrayed too.

Stand-up comedy in Colombia has been promoted by the show Happy Saturdays Sabados Felices, produced by Caracol TV. The show which has been on the air for more than three decades has allowed stand-up comedians to show their skills during a segment called Los Cuentachistes. Although not real stand-up comedians in the current standards of today's stand-up comedy, the contestants participate weekly for prizes and the opportunity to continue being on stage for following weeks. A grand finale showing the best of them would usually come at the end of the season. This talent usually is adopted by Sabados Felices as part of their own actors for their sketches. Sabados Felices although a purely family oriented show, also lampoons Colombian society and Colombian politics.

=== Late 80s and early 90s ===
During the late 1980s a new comedy called Dejémonos de Vainas (understood locally as "Let's cut the crap") depicted a completely urban upper-middle-class family from Bogotá. However, it brought together people from different regions and in fact the show used this aspect as a subject matter in many episodes.

Radio comedy also contributed in many aspects of television based comedy. "El manicomio de Vargasvil" (The Vargasvil's madhouse), produced in Medellín, was broadcast by the Caracol Radio network. Its creator, Crisanto Alfonso Vargas (Vargasvil) used edgy humour and strong satire against Colombian politicians.

He leaped from radio to television by appearing in Sabados Felices where later on he would become a regular guest.

=== Late 90s and 2000 ===
By this time Colombian comedy started to create new variations and identities.

There was comedy based on the use of amateurs on the streets combined with professionals or semi-professionals stand up comedians.

A successful show that changed the way comedy was made was No Me Lo Cambie (an imperative sentence which means Don't you change it (the channel) on me). With new staff and new writers the show was determined to use local creativity combined with segments imported from American and European shows. It also used hidden camera situations with pedestrians being part of funny moments.

Well elaborated scripts started to be written and intellectuals started to contribute and in fact some of them used comedy to defend their ideological affiliations.

A good example is Jaime Garzón and his show Zoociedad (Zoociety) where a combination of talent and strong political satire made the show one of the most watched throughout Colombia. After Zoociedad, Jaime Garzón continued working in a new project called Quac El Noticero (translated as Quac The News, where Noticero is a combination of the words news and the number zero in Spanish) where he reinvented himself by creating new characters depicting the nation, middle-class people or intellectuals. The show was intended to be a comedy presented in a news format.

Jaime Garzón became a historical figure in Colombia by his depiction of a shoe-polisher who interviewed many local celebrities. However, because of his ideological affiliations and his openness and strong criticism to Colombia's government and politics, Jaime Garzón was shot to death on his way to the radio station where he worked.

Jaime Garzón's death marked a strong atmosphere of fear among Colombian comediants and even on the media itself which saw itself censored by the violence of the Colombian conflict. In fact, to this date there is not one Colombian comedian that can be thought as a Jaime Garzón's successor.

During the 1990s, actors Martin de Francisco and Santiago Moure influenced by Howard Stern developed a new style of humour.

Their comedy was based on aspects of comedy, new to Colombian society. With a skeptical and irreverent attitude towards the world, their country and even themselves, Moure and De Francisco developed a new style which included self-deprecation, toilet humor, and dark humor. Martin de Francisco and Santiago Moure originally started in a show called La Tele "The Tele" originally produced by Carlos Vives and intended to a mature audience.

Although Francisco and Moure themselves declared that the ratings were not good and that was the reason why the show did not last long, it is rumored that the show did well as far as ratings. Moure and Francisco did in reverse what Vargasvil had done earlier in his career. They leaped from television to radio. Despite their short lived show their material evolved into an animated series named The Next Show El Siguiente Programa. The series were successful and marked a generation. Because of its popularity and the widespread of segments on the show uploaded by fans to YouTube, De Francisco and Moure sought to revive it on a DVD collection and a new website.

=== 2000 to the present ===
During the late 1990s to the beginning of the new millennium Colombian comedian Jose Ordoñez became a national celebrity by setting a world record for the person with the longest time telling jokes on the radio.

He started in 1993 by telling jokes on national radio. First he did it for 24 hours and periodically he improved his record to 65 hours. With his profit José Ordóñez started his own production company where he created new comedy shows such as Lo Que Faltaba! (translated to English as 'Just what was missing!') and also "Ordóñese de la risa" (the word Ordóñez is similar in Spanish to the word ordeñar which is the act to milk the cow, and the words -de la risa- which means literally "of the laughter", so it is a combination that could be understood as milk yourself out of the laughter) The shows did not have a great audience and were cancelled.

Currently many of the comedians above are still working in new projects or are working in a different genre. One of the comedians most talked about at the present time in Colombia is Andrés López Forero, he is better known for his stand-up comedy.

López Forero can be thought as the pioneer of stand-up comedy in Colombia and he is in fact the first person that has publicly used the term stand-up to describe his show.

López's show "The Ball of Letters" - La Pelota de Letras consists of a subtle sociological analysis of life in Latin American countries between the 1960s and the 2000s. More than 2,500,000 people have attended his shows since his first appearance at the Hard Rock Cafe Bogotá in the beginning of 2004. In August 2005, when he opened a concert with 44,000 guests, he was given a standing ovation after the show.

In December 2005, in the Hard Rock Cafe Bogotá using the Universal Music Colombia label he launched La Pelota de Letras on DVD.

In 2005 he won the HOLA Award from the Hispanic Organization of Latin Actors for the "Outstanding Solo Performance" after his sold out shows in New York and Miami.

On March 2, 2006 Andrés López was presented with a Diamond DVD from Universal Music. Attending this celebration was the singer Wilfrido Vargas. By the end of 2006 López had sold more than 100,000 DVDs, and the Ball of Letters is now the best selling DVD in Colombia.

López began his international tour in July 2006 performing in eleven cities: Los Angeles at the Alex Theatre; Panamá at Teatro Balboa; Quito at Teatro Nacional; Toronto at the John Bassett Theater; New York at the Town Hall; Miami at James L Knight Center; Greenville at the Peace Center; Madrid at Teatro Gran Via and Palacio de Congresos de Madrid; Houston at Stafford Center; Orlando at Osceola Performing Arts Center and Atlanta at the Center Stage Theater. An average of 1,500 people attended these shows.

== See also ==
- Jaime Garzón
- Andrés López Forero
- Comedy
- Stand up comedy
- American humor
- British humour
