= Hernando Casanova =

Colombian actor and director (1945–2002)

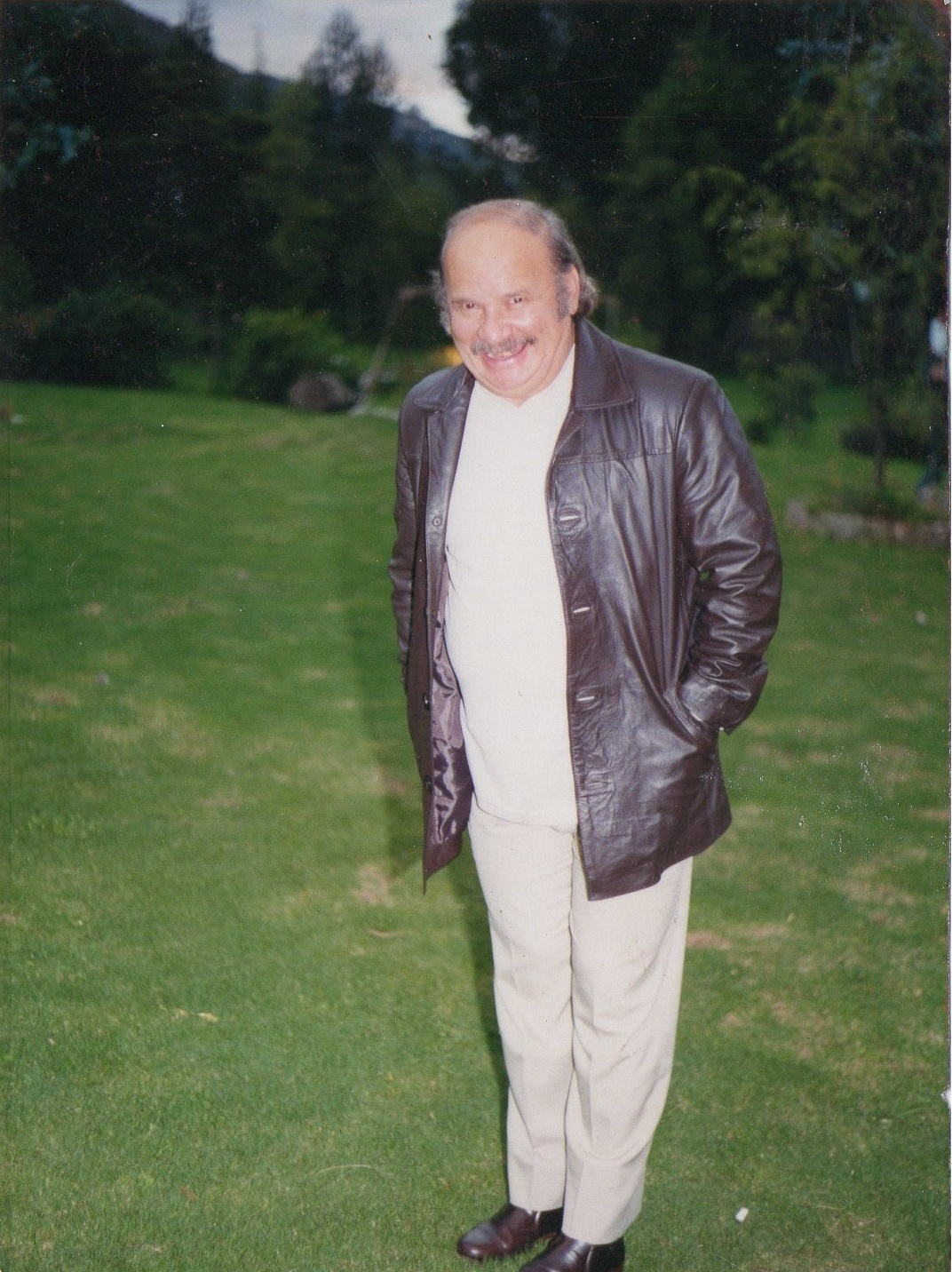
- Hernando in early 2000s
- Born: Hernando Casanova Escobar; April 21, 1945; Neiva, Huila, Colombia
- Died: October 24, 2002 (aged 57); Bogotá, Colombia
- Occupations: Actor, director, screenwriter, singer, composer
- Years active: 1965–2002
- Height: 5 ft 7 in (170 cm)
- Spouses: Elsa Ruiz (m. 1969; div. 1983) Gilma Sampayo (m. 1984; div. 2002)
- Children: 5

Hernando Casanova Escobar known as El Culebro Casanova (Neiva, Huila, April 21, 1945 - Bogotá D.C., October 24, 2002), was a Colombian actor, director, singer, and television presenter. He is considered one of the pioneers of comedy and one of the most important actors in the history of Colombia. His versatility as an actor led him to become not only an icon of humor but also of drama. He was regarded as the best actor in Colombia during the peak of his career. Throughout his career, he received multiple awards and recognitions for his artistic achievements, including his nomination as a revelation actor at the Ondra Awards in Spain and the award for best dramatic actor at the APE Awards.

Hernando Casanova began his career as a singer in the Club del Clan (1966), where he was part of the first generation of Colombian rock, and later made his acting debut with a brief role in the soap opera "Cartas a Beatriz" (1969). His career gained momentum, and he gained national recognition for his role as Hernando María de las Casas in the series "Yo y tú" (1975) by Alicia del Carpio. Later, he reached the peak of success with his character Eutimio Pastrana Polanía in the series "Don Chinche" (1982-1989) by Pepe Sánchez. His portrayal of the Huilense culture made him one of the most representative and influential figures in Colombian television history. Additionally, Casanova was a pioneer in sketch comedy, directing, writing, and acting in "Los Meros Recochan Boy's," a section of the successful show "El Show de Jimmy" (1976-1993) hosted by Jimmy Salcedo. Among his other notable roles are Salomón in "Embrujo Verde" (1977), the lead role in "Farzán" (1983), presenter in "El tiempo es oro, su pueblo gana" (1986), Wilson Rodríguez in "El pasado no perdona" (1991), Yardines Murillo in "Perro Amor" (1998), and Vicente Secretario in "Amor a mil" (2001). In the film industry, Casanova was the emblematic actor of Chilean filmmaker Dunav Kuzmanich, even being named "the greatest Colombian actor of all time." He acted in movies such as "Canaguaro" (1981), "La agonía del difunto" (1982), "Mariposas S.A" (1986), and "Apocalipsur" (2007).

In 2015, his children started the production of a documentary feature film about his life titled El Culebro: La historia de mi papá. The film narrates the actor's life from the perspective of his youngest son, Nicolás Casanova. It premiered on September 20, 2017, at the Eureka University Festival. The documentary received favorable reviews and was well-received by the Colombian audience, highlighting its historical importance. Later, the film was broadcast on the program "Entre Ojos" on Caracol Televisión, becoming the most-watched program in its time slot that day. It also premiered in the United States in October 2022. Additionally, "El Culebro: La exhibición," an exhibition of photographs, video clips, awards, and costumes of Casanova's characters, took place at the Huila House in Bogotá.

Casanova's controversial private life received significant attention. His parties, disorder, and excesses led him to experience periods of depression and anxiety. He was married twice and had five children. He died on October 24, 2002, due to a fulminant heart attack at the Cardioinfantil Foundation in Bogotá. His death was a national shock and considered an invaluable loss in the Colombian entertainment world.

== Early life ==
Hernando Casanova was born in Neiva, department of Huila, Colombia, on April 21, 1945, the only male of his parents Blanca Casanova and Guillermo Escobar. Her mother gave him her last name since his father did not legally recognize him. Casanova attended Santa Librada School in Neiva and he dropped out after ninth grade. At the age of sixteen he joined the National Army of Colombia in the Marine Corps. Besides his duties as a militar, he performed with the soldiers in several plays, musicals and fashion shows. However, two months later, while serving in Buenaventura, he deserted. Soon after, he turned himself in and was transferred to Bogotá to take a course for non-commissioned officers. During his time in the army, he became an Olympic wrestling and featherweight boxing champion in the military engineers unit. Later, he settled in Yaguará, Colombia, to work as a teacher for fifth-grade students.

From an early age, Casanova showed a fascination for the world of entertainment. He performed several plays at his school in Neiva, among them a play about Adam and Eve, where Casanova played the role of Eve. At the age of eleven, he would escape from school to join the circus or participate in RCN's Ondas del Huila radio show, where he sang in the evenings. He also participated in a radio show called El Mundo infantil where he dramatized stories based on real events. Later, Casanova joined Carlos Emilio Campos' theater company. His debut as an actor occurred in his native Neiva, in the middle of a dispute between an actor and Carlos Campos. The actor resigned and it was Casanova who replaced him. After this, he toured the country with the theater company. Hernando Casanova never took drama classes, but he was an avid consumer of cinema and was convinced that much could be learned about the craft in movie theaters.

== Filmography ==
=== Television ===
Year	Title	Rol	Notes
2020	República de Comedia	Himself	Archive Footage - Episode 03
2020	Yo, José Gabriel Inolvidable	Himself / Yardines Murillo	Archive Footage - Episode 40 Don Chinche, Laura Pausini, Gregorio Pernía
2019	Los Informantes	Himself	Archive Footage - Episode 292 'Todo por mi madre / Suso, el Dani / Las vidas del Culebro Casanova'
2019	Expediente Final	Himself	Archive footage
2016	Simplemente Pacheco	Himself	Archive footage
2015	Colombia en el espejo: 60 años de la Televisión	Himself	Archive footage
2002	Protagonistas de fuera de Lugar	Himself	Actuación Especial
2002	Historias de hombres, sólo para mujeres	Various	Actuación Especial - 3 episodios
2002	Y por qué no?	Himself	
2001 - 2002	Amor a mil	Vicente Secretario	
2001	Waku-Waku	Himself	
2000	Se armó la gorda	Justo Franco	
2000	Modestia aparte	Himself	
1999	Francotiradores	Himself	Guest
1999	Yo, José Gabriel	Himself / Yardines Murillo	
1999	Crónicas de Catre	Varios personajes	2 Episodes
1998	Perro Amor	Yardines Murillo	
1998	Gente	Himself	
1998	El siguiente programa	Himself	Archive Footage
1997	Fuego Verde	Tito	Special Guest
1996	Charlas con Pacheco	Himself	
1993–1995	Las Aventuras de Eutimio	Eutimio Pastrana Polanía	
1991	El pasado no perdona	Wilson Rodríguez	
1991	El Doctor Don Chinche	Eutimio Pastra Polanía	
1991	Nostalgia	Himself	
1989	Bendita Mentira		
1986–1988	Musiloquisimo	Various	
1987	Me río de los martes		
1985–1987	El Tiempo es oro, su pueblo gana	Himself	Host
1983	Farzán	Farzán	
1982-1989	Don Chinche	Eutimio Pastrana Polanía	
1976-1993	El show de Jimmy	Himself	Writer, actor and director "Los Recochan Boys"
1984	Sabariedades	Himself	
1982	El Esmeraldero	-	
1982	Cuánto vale su actuación	Himself (Jurado)	
1982	Juanita	-	
1981	La tía Julia y el escribidor	-	
1981	Revivamos nuestra historia: Bolívar, el hombre de las dificultades	Domingo Monteverde	
1981	La aldeana	-	
1980	Humor Imposible	-	
1980	Las dos huerfanitas	-	
1979	Mujercitas	-	
1979	El Cuento del domingo: Bola de sebo	-	Directed by Bernardo Romero and Based on Guy de Maupassant's Boule de Suif
1978	Manuelita Sáenz	Alcides de Mendoza	
1978	Los Pérez Somos así	-	-
1978	El caballero de Rauzán	Boris	-
1978	Teatro popular Caracol: Cachaco, Palomo y Gato	Gato	-
1977	Embrujo verde	Salomón	Won at the APE's an award for best drama actor
1977	Puerta Al Suspenso	-	-
1976	Las señoritas Gutiérrez	-	
1976	Teatro Popular Caracol: Después nos divorciamos		
1976	La Trampa	-	-
1976	Aroma de Secreto	Turco	-
1976	Memorias Fantásticas	-	-
1976	Una pareja con suerte	-	-
1976	El gran musical	Himself	
1975	La Mala Hora	-	
1975	La Suicida		
1973	Sábados felices	Various	
1973	La Herencia	-	-
1973	La Rosquilla	-	-
1973 - 1975	Yo y tú	Hernando María de las casas	
1972	Caso Juzgado	-	-
1971	Una vida para amarte		
1969	Cartas a Beatriz	-	
1969	Vespertina Dominical	Himself	
1966	El Club del Clan	Himself	

=== Films ===
Year	Title	Director	Character	Notes
1971	Taciturno	Jorge Gaitán Gómez	-	
1978	El candidato	Mario Mitrotti	-	
1978	El Patas	Pepe Sánchez	-	
1979	Tigre	Rodolfo de Anda	-	
1980	Cien años de infidelidad	Eduardo Sáenz	-	
1981	Canaguaro	Dunav Kuzmanich	Profesor	
1982	La agonía del difunto	Dunav Kuzmanich	Benigno Sampués	
1984	Ajuste de cuentas	Dunav Kuzmanich	Eliazar	
1985	El Día de las Mercedes	Dunav Kuzmanich	Santiago Rodríguez Las Mercedes	
1986	Mariposas S.A.	Dunav Kuzmanich	Serrano	-
2007	Apocalipsur	Javier Mejía	El Papíto	Cameo
2014	Duni	Javier Mejía	Himself	Archive footage
2017	El Culebro: La historia de mi papá	Nicolás Casanova	Himself	Archive footage
