= LaMoure =

LaMoure may refer to:

- LaMoure, North Dakota
- LaMoure County, North Dakota
- La Moure Township, North Dakota, in Pembina County
