= Foundation University of Health Sciences =

Private educational and health care university in Bogotá, Colombia

Health Sciences University Foundation
- Type: Private
- Established: 1937 (Bogotá)
- President: Dr. Jorge Gómez Cusnir (Bogotá)
- Rector: Dr. Sergio Agusto Parra Duarte (Bogotá)
- Dean: Dr. Oscar Eduardo Mora Hernández (Bogotá)
- Location: Carrera 52 Nº 67A-71 (Bogotá), Bogotá, Colombia
- Colors: Blue, yellow, and white
- Website: www.fucsalud.edu.co/(Bogotá)

The Health Sciences University Foundation (Spanish: Fundación Universitaria de Ciencias de la Salud - FUCS) is a private educational and health care university founded in 1976. It has two locations: the main hospital and one in the University Children's Hospital, San José, Bogotá, Colombia. It offers seven undergraduate programs: Business Administration, Nursing, Surgical technologist, Medicine, Psychology with clinical emphasis, Emergency medical technician (EMT) and Cytology.

== History ==
The University's history is closely linked to the birth of the Society for Surgery of the Hospital of Bogotá.

In 1902 after the Thousand Days' War the era of aseptic surgery began. That year a group of ten physicians joined to build a modern hospital. Guillermo Gomez and Jose Maria Montoya originated the idea of creating a society and described the idea on June 22, 1902 to Nicolás Buendia, Cuellar Zoilo Duran, Hipolito Machado, Juan Evangelista Manrique, Eliseo Montaña, Isaac Rodriguez, Diego Sanchez and Julio Z. Torres. This group of physicians gathered at Club Doctor and founded the Society. The Hospital of St. José. Starting operation on July 22, 1925, favoring the underprivileged inhabitants of Bogotá.

On March 3, 1937, teaching officially began with the founding of the School of Nursing. In 1939 the School of Nursing became part of the National University of Colombia.

In 1944 anesthesiology courses were initiated. The next year the hospital offered support for students at Javeriana University in the areas of pathology, internal medicine and specialties, surgery and obstetrics. In 1947, a prostate cancer faculty emerged.

In 1951 The Surgical Technician School was born, approved by Decree No. 402 of February 23, 1951, by the School of Hygiene, giving its graduates the title of Surgical Technicians. In the same year the first cohort of medical specialist started with cardiovascular surgery began to practice in the hospital.

In 1961 an agreement was reached with the Sena for nursing assistants to have classes and practices in the hospital. In 1965 the hospital partnered with the College of Our Lady of the Rosary to begin medical school classes, starting March 1, 1966 with 40 students. In 1966 Colombian Red Cross nurses joined and approved the formal ASCOFAME postgraduate program.

In 1977 nursing school programs included intensive care, nephrology, urology, emergency and health management.

In 1980 the Technology Foundation was established for allied healthcare professionals. In 1987 the reform of the Foundation Paramedic Technology Careers was approved by the ICFES in parallel with the school of Health Sciences to secure approval.

In 1993 the country's first Cytotechnolgy school was created. As of 2014 the program had graduated 274 Cytotechnologists. In 1994 the name changed to Health Sciences University Foundation. In 1997 ICFES issued an operating license for the medical school of the Health Sciences University Foundation. Nursing, Surgical and Medical Instruments were added to the existing 34 medical and surgical disciplines approved by the ICFES.

In 2005 the university acquired the former Lorencita Villegas de Santos to expand the training sites for its students becoming the University Children's Hospital of San Jose for its undergraduate and graduate programs. In 2010 the Faculty of Social Sciences, Management and Economics opened, offering undergraduate Business Administration and Psychology.

== Campus ==
The physical plant consists of the teaching building, the Hospital de San José de Bogota, University Children's Hospital of San José, non-profit character and academic assistance.

It also has practice settings, which help develop knowledge areas through teaching-service agreements.

The Foundation has four halls, three in the headquarters of the Hospital San Jose and the headquarters of the Children's Hospital.

=== San Jose Hospital ===
The Hospital has the necessary technology for highly specialized medical and surgical treatments for children and adults. It also has an ambulatory outpatient area, 242-bed inpatient wards, surgery rooms, automated clinical laboratory, diagnostic imaging, intensive care unit, adult renal unit.

=== San Jose University Children's Hospital ===
The remodel offers delivery rooms, operating rooms, emergency clinics, outpatient department and a large intensive care unit and intermediate care. It also offers a range of specialties in the areas of General Surgery, pediatrics, neurological sciences, internal medicine and outpatient care.

=== Laboratories ===
The Foundation offers laboratories in biology, biochemistry, anatomy, physiology, genetics, immunology, histology, microbiology and clinical simulation.

A modern Experimental Microsurgery Laboratory is located in San Jose Hospital, where students, doctors and teachers can learn and practice this discipline.

This laboratory was opened by the Faculty of Medicine, provides ENT benefit services, plastic surgery, ophthalmology, neurosurgery and vascular surgery.
