= Andrés López Forero =

Colombian comedian and actor

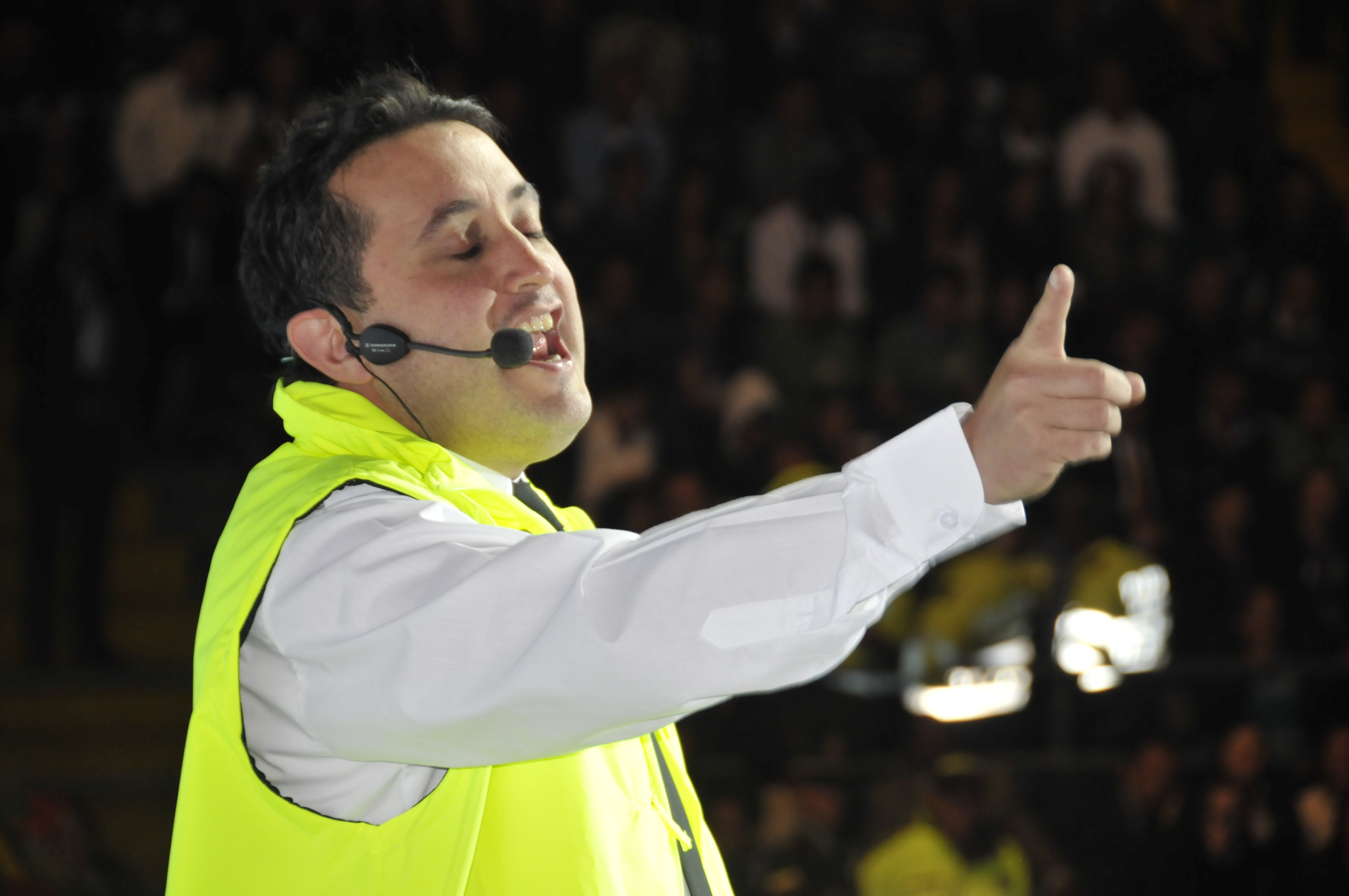
- Plan Integral Policial para la Seguridad del Ciudadano “Corazón Verde”
- Born: Andrés López Forero; June 25, 1971 (age 55); Bogotá, Colombia
- Website: http://www.andreslopez.com

Andrés López (born June 25, 1971) is a comedian and actor. He is considered a pioneer of stand-up comedy in Colombia. López gained notoriety in Colombia after releasing his show called La Pelota de Letras (The Ball of Letters) which earned him a Double Diamond award from Universal Music.

== Beginning of his career ==
As a student of Systems Engineering and Anthropology 1990 he started performing in the Universidad de los Andes in Bogotá. Later the University assigned a classroom for him to teach the art of stand-up comedy to people interested in performing dramatic and comedic theater. He also created the University Newspaper “El Mercurio” where there was room for people to express themselves artistically by placing their stories, paintings, poems and photographs.

Later he went to Toronto to study Experiential education and became a dedicated reader and a researcher of human behavior. Lopez returned to Colombia to work at "La Mega RCN". A pop-music radio station which was aimed mainly at young people. There he became a creative force by developing many comedy skits such as 'Tratame Suavemente' (Treat me Softly) better known as 'Catalina y mi Andy', 'Juan Bracitos' (Juan Little Arms), 'Jason Libardo' and many others for the morning show also known as El Mañanero. On 2008 he uploaded new material of those skits on iTunes.

Due to the rising popularity of the morning show it was given its own TV show by RCN TV. Pido La Parola, as this show was called was mainly based on sketches, spoofs and prank calls, many of which were led by Andrés López.

== Theater plays ==
López has also been performing in various venues as part of the cast. In 1998 he performed in the Colombian version of The Complete Works of William Shakespeare or “Las Obras de William Shakespeare” directed by Juan Angel and co-starred by David Guerrero and Fernando Solórzano. Andrés played Juliet Capulet, Desdemona, Lady Macbeth, Ophelia and other Shakespearian women on this work.

In 2003 the show changed its name to “The Royal Shakespeare Criollo” and later changed it again to “Shakespeare para locos”. The original version by the Reduced Shakespeare Company was first performed at the Edinburgh Fringe Festival in 1987 and is London's longest-running comedy.

== Recent career ==
López's most recognized show The Ball of Letters-La Pelota de Letras consists of a subtle sociological analysis of life in Colombian families between the 1960s and the 2000s (decade). More than 2,500,000 people attended his shows since his first appearance at the Hard Rock Cafe Bogota in the beginning of 2004.

As today he has been performing more than 1500 sold-out shows in Colombia and other countries, 5 tours around Colombia and more than 500 private shows for companies. Andres has performed in many cities in Colombia and internationally.

In December 2005, he launched, La Pelota de Letras on DVD in the Hard Rock Cafe Bogota under the Universal Music Colombia label .

López began his international tour in July 2006 performing in the cities: Los Angeles at the Alex Theatre; Panamá at Teatro Balboa; Quito at Teatro Nacional; Toronto at the John Bassett Theater; New York at the Town Hall; Miami at James L. Knight Center; Greenville at the Peace Center; Madrid at Teatro Gran Via and Palacio de Congresos de Madrid; Houston at Stafford Center; Orlando at Osceola Performing Arts Center and Atlanta at the Center Stage Theater. An average of 1,500 people attended these shows.

On April 23, 2007, Andrés launched a new DVD called Me Pido La Ventana (I have the Window!, as he translates it). On the same day Andrés López was presented with a Double Diamond DVD from Universal Music Group.

From May to June 2007 Andrés performed in Spain, the biggest Latin comedy tour after the famous Les Luthiers

In September 2007 Andrés toured USA with Me Pido la Ventana: Orlando, FL at Bob Carr Performing Art Center; Queens, NY at Colden Auditorium Queens College; Elizabeth, NJ at The Ritz Theatre and Performing Arts Center; Atlanta, GA at Center Stage; Houston, TX at Stafford Center Theatre and in Boston, MA at Symphony Hall where he performed "La Pelota de Letras".

Since the end of 2007, Andres is part of the agency William Morris. On January 19, 2008, for the first time a Colombian, Andrés López, performed on South Beach Comedy Festival sponsored by IMPROV, Comedy Central, The Miami Herald and others, at The Fillmore, The Jackie Gleason Theatre 7:30pm, January 16–19, 2008

Andrés performed with other comedians like Kathy Griffin, nominated to the Emmy Awards and famous for been the cast on the show Suddenly Susan, Brooke Shields. Other Comedians: Dave Attell, Jeff Dunham, Jeffrey Ross, Katt Williams, Kristina Wong, Louis C.K., Ralphie May and Stephen Lynch.

In January 2008 Andres toured Spain with Me Pido la Ventana, the cities were: Madrid, Barcelona, Pamplona, Valencia, Palma de Mallorca

At the end of 2007 and 2008 Andrés toured Colombia, Ecuador and Venezuela as a Soldier of the Happiness he decided to show the brotherhood between the people of those countries. The shows he has been performing are La Pelota de Letras, the conference "The Way to Happiness" and he has been part of the "Festival for a Better World"

In 2008 Andrés has been performing also in San José, Costa Rica and Toronto, Montreal and London, Canadá.

In December 2008 for the first time Andres is going to perform in Mexico City at Lunario.

25, November 2008, The Second Commission of the Senate of the Republic of Colombia presented Andres Lopez with the Order of Merit to the Democracy in the Degree of Great Gentlemen.

On October 16, 2008, Andrés López was part of the host at the MTV Latin American Awards 2008. Premios MTV Latinoamérica which took place in Guadalajara, Mexico.

== News 2010 ==
January to March 2010 season of “Frutica Picada” in Colombia, Pereira, Barranquilla and Armenia. March 2, 2010. Andrés performed to golfers at the Club Country de Bogota as a welcome to the Nationwide Tour after the Celebrity Pro-Am of Juan Pablo Montoya to the benefit of Formula Sonrisas and Camilo Villegas Fund. Andrés was invited by Connie Freydell to play golf at the Celebrity Pro-Am but Robert Gould played for him and Andrés was his caddie at the tournament. Andrés López is also the public image of the biggest Golf store in Bogotá, G.LF Store – Tienda de Golf. Since March 14, 2010, Andrés is the appointed messenger for the Prevention of Crime, a project led by United Nations in Colombia. On April 10, 2010, Andrés performs a Stand-Up Comedy show at the Plaza de Bolívar Bogotá for a Red Bull event, where David Coulthard did a show with his Formula 1 car.

Since April 2009, Andrés has been focused on entertaining his followers via Twitter and Facebook where he has more than 2,000,000 fans, making him one of the most followed Colombian celebrities. He has been creating series like #NiñaFresa, Insulto Subrepticio del Día #ISdD and #Divide2. Between May and June 2010 RCN, Colombian Television Network, aired "La Pelota de Letras". They received their highest ratings for the week. "Frutica Picada" was aired exclusivity on OnDIRECTV, from 11 to 14 of June to the countries: Argentina, Peru, Chile, Venezuela, Ecuador, Puerto Rico, Uruguay and the Caribbean. DirecTV officially published a document on its website that indicates that the show had the highest rating in Latinoamérica in June and July second only to the Opening of the World Cup FIFA 2010. 18 August 2010. López launches at the Book Fair in Bogotá his book "La Pelota de Letras, manuscrito original" with the editor Ediciones B, according to President of Ediciones B, Philippe Vergnaud, the book was the most sold book at the fair. September and October 2010 Andrés López was the host and performed his Stand-Up Comedy at the International Humor festival for Caracol Television, Colombian Televisión Network. This festival has been on air every year since 1982. At the Festival great performers, magicians, imitators, had been performing from countries like Venezuela, Cuba, Uruguay, Guatemala, the US, Canadá, Chile, Spain and England. September 2010 Andrés is part of the campaign “Sexuality with Sense” "Sexualidad con Sentido" lead and financed by Ministry of Social Protection and the Population Found of United Nations (UNFPA), Ministry of National Education Special Programs of the Presidency.

== News 2011 ==
In January 2011 DirecTV Latin America bought the rights from Caracol Televisión to air the International Humor Festival where Andrés was the host. The festival is currently airing on DirecTV throughout Argentina, the Caribbean, Chile, Colombia, Ecuador, Peru, Puerto Rico, Uruguay and Venezuela. In April and May 2011 Andrés López performed in Australia and Venezuela: Melbourne, Australia 29 April, "La Pelota de Letras 1000" at Athenaeum Theater. Brisbane, Australia 30 April, "La Pelota de Letras 1000" at The Trivoli. And Andrés López performed for The Sydney Comedy Festival in Sydney, Australia, 1 of May, La "Pelota de Letras 1000" Enmore Theatre Newtown May 13, 14 "La Pelota de Letras" and May 15 with "Frutica Picada" at Santa Rosa de Lima Theater, Caracas Venezuela

== DirecTV talk show host ==
On November 1, 2012 DirecTV Latin America launches the talk show "Andrés López de Noche". Hosted by Andrés López, every Thursday López interviews two Latin American celebrities. The show is transmitted in the channel OnDirecTV (201) to Colombia, Ecuador, Peru, Venezuela, Argentina, Chile, Uruguay, Puerto Rico (Channel 161) and the Caribbean: Trinidad & Tobago; Aruba y Curaçao; Barbados. Some of the guest the show will welcome are: Wilfrido Vargas, Ismael Cala, Andrés Cepeda, Fanny Lu, Carlos Ponce, Stephanie Cayo y John Paul Ospina

== Filmography ==
=== Films ===
Year	Title	Role	Notes
2005	La Pelota de Letras	Himself	Distributed by Universal Music in DVD format
2007	Me Pido La Ventana	Himself	Distributed by Universal Music in DVD format
2009	Me Pido La Ventana con Frutica Picada	Himself	Distributed by Universal Music in DVD format
2013	De Rolling por Colombia	Chucho	Directed by Harold Trompetero. With Andrés López, Natalia Duran, Jimmy Vasquez.
2016	De Rolling 2: Por el sueño mundialista	Chucho	Directed by Harold Trompetero.
2016	The adventures of Nuku	Nuku	Voice actor
2016	The Secret Life of Pets	Max	Latin-American version, voice
2018	Rolling Elvis	Elvis Antonio's Adult Voice	

=== Television ===
Year	Title	Role	Notes
2011	International Humor Festival	Host	Caracol Televisión and DirecTV Latin America
2012	Andrés López de Noche	Host	talk show DirecTV Latin America
2017	Protagonistas de Novela	Himself	Guest instructor

== Awards ==
In 2005 he won the Hispanic Organization of Latin Actors (HOLA) Award for the "Outstanding Solo Performance" after his sold-out shows in New York and Miami.

On March 2 of 2006 Andrés López was presented with a Diamond DVD from Universal Music Group. Attending this celebration was singer Wilfrido Vargas. By the end of 2006 Lopez had sold more than 100,000 DVDs, and the Ball of Letters is now the best selling DVD in Colombia.

On April 23, 2007, Andrés López was presented with a Double Diamond DVD from Universal Music Group for La Pelota de Letras DVD.

In July 2007 Andrés was presented with another Diamond DVD from Universal Music Group. Andrés López sold more than 70,000 DVDs of "Me Pido la Ventana", his second DVD, since its launching in April 2007.

December 5, 2006, was presented with the Premio Orquidea USA for best international talent 2006.

On January 1,.2008 Andrés was presented with the award "The 10 people of the culture" by El Tiempo Newspaper and the Ministry of Culture

In November 2008, The Second Commission of the Senate of the Republic of Colombia presented Andres López with the Order of Merit to the Democracy in the Degree of Great Gentlemen.

Other awards: "ON Award to the Creative Mind" by Universidad Autonoma de Occidente, Cali Colombia. Recognitions by Casa Militar de la Presidencia de la República de Colombia, Ministerio de Defensa Nacional de Colombia, Ejército Nacional, Base Aérea Palanquero, Dirección de Protección y Servicios Especiales de la Policía Nacional de Colombia, Escuela Naval de Suboficiales de Barranquilla, Cuarta Brigada de Medellín, Central de Inteligencia Militar, Comando de Apoyo Logístico de la Infantería de Marina.

== Media ==
According to Revista Semana, López is one of the 40 Most Influential People in Colombia under 40.

The most important newspaper in Colombia, El Tiempo, has also described his show The Ball of Letters-La Pelota de Letras as:

"The performance portrays the customs of recent generations of Colombians, which is better than any sociology study".

In December 2007, El Tiempo and the Ministry of Culture gave an award to the 10 most important artist of the last 10 years, Andrés was ranked fifth.

== Personal life ==
Andrés is son on Olga Forero Vargas an Industrial Engineer from Bucaramanga, Santander and Sebastián de Jesús López Agudelo a Civil Engineer from Medellín, Antioquia. His parents separated when he was six years old. Him and his sister stayed with their mother. On July 5, 2018, he and his wife welcomed their daughter Olivia.

Lopez is a Scientologist.

== Other activities ==
López has created a motivational speech product for employees which includes parts of his shows and these products have been used by businesses to bring about radical internal changes.

Companies using López include: Hewlett-Packard, Alquería, Oracle Corporation, Roche, Microsoft, Merck & Co., IBM, The Coca-Cola Company, BAT, Unilever, Grupo Santander, Porvenir, ETB, Intel Corporation, Nestlé Purina PetCare, Nestlé, Avantel, Alpina, Bavaria, Altria Group, Colsubsidio and more.

López has also taken part in numerous talk shows, hosting TV programs as well as a multitude of interviews on TV and radio; he has also written for newspapers and various magazines.

== The Way to Happiness ==
Andres performs conferences about The Way to Happiness

== See also ==
- List of comedians
- List of stand-up comedians
