= Consuelo Moure =

Colombian actress (1947–2014)

Consuelo Moure de Ramírez (1947 – 2 April 2014) was a Colombian actress from Pamplona, Norte de Santander, known for her roles in such films as Nochebuena, Pena máxima, La esquina, Tres hombres y tres mujeres, Es mejor ser rico que pobre, and Champagne.

She ran for the Colombian Senate several times, but was not elected.

Moure died on 2 April 2014 in Bogotá from lung cancer, aged 67.

== Other websites ==
- Consuelo Moure at IMDb
