= The Liberators University =

Los Libertadores
- Fundación Universitaria Los Libertadores
- Type: Privada
- Principal: Ángela María Merchán Basabe
- Students: 13.000
- Location: Bogotá Carrera 16 # 63 A - 68 - Cartagena Calle 31 No. 19 - 51 Barrio Pie de la Popa, Bogotá, D.C., Cundinamarca, Colombia
- Website: www.ulibertadores.edu.co

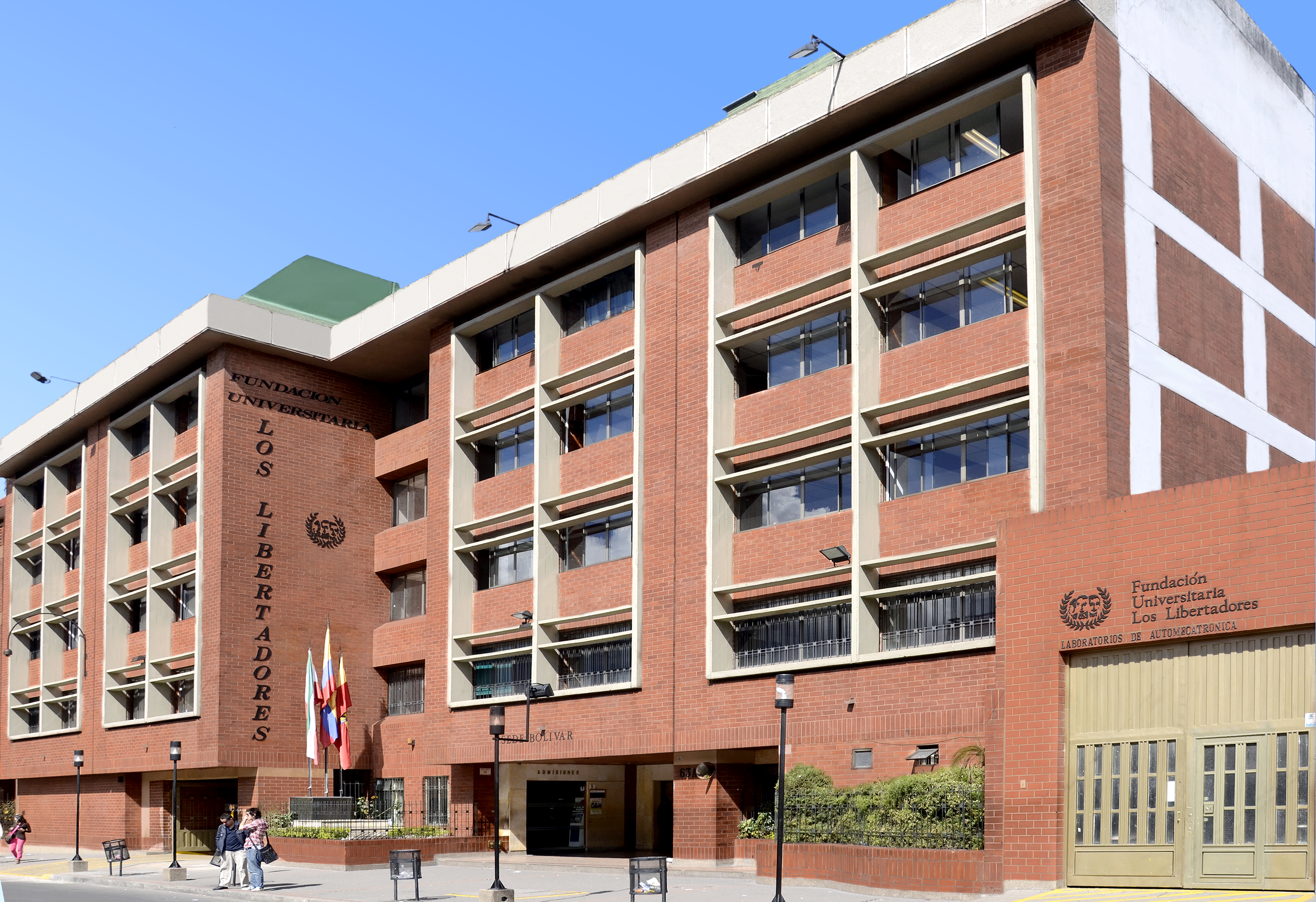
Facade of the Los Libertadores University Foundation.

Los Libertadores University is a university located in Bogotá, Colombia. It was founded in 1982.

Its history spans more than 40 years of achievements. It has trained more than 140,000 graduates in undergraduate and graduate programs, who have contributed to the development and social transformation of Colombia.

In 2004, the Hernando Santos Castillo Library and the Santander Building were inaugurated in the presence of the then Vice President of the Republic, Francisco Santos Calderón, and the founders of the Institution, Dr. Hernán Linares, Dr. Jaime Alberto Moreno and Dr. Pablo Oliveros Marmolejo.

Los Libertadores received High Quality Accreditation in 2014 for the Social Communication - Journalism, Tourism and Hotel Administration, and Psychology programs. A year later, the Ministry of National Education recognized the Advertising and Marketing program.
