= Gloria Moure =

Gloria Moure is a Spanish art historian, critic, curator and editor. She lives in Barcelona.

== Biography ==
Gloria Moure studied Art History at the Facultad de Filosofía y Letras of the Universitat de Barcelona, where she gained her doctorate with the thesis The contemporary discontinuity of modern art. Annotations to the work of Sigmar Polke. She began her career in 1977 as a freelance curator with the exhibition Richard Hamilton–Dieter Roth at the Fundació Joan Miró in Barcelona. In 1984, she curated a major Marcel Duchamp retrospective (Fundació Miró, Barcelona; la Caixa, Madrid, and Ludwig Museum, Cologne), the fifth after those at the Pasadena Art Museum (now Norton Simon Museum, 1963), the Tate Gallery (1966), the Philadelphia Museum of Art (1973), then travelling to the Museum of Modern Art of New York and the Art Institute of Chicago, and, finally, the Centre national d'art et de culture Georges Pompidou (1977).

She was director of the Fundació Espai Poblenou in Barcelona from its opening in 1989 until 1995 and curated the first exhibitions in Spain of renowned artists such as Lawrence Weiner, Rodney Graham, Sigmar Polke, Richard Long, John Cage, Bruce Nauman, Mario Merz and Jannis Kounellis, among others.

In 1994, she was appointed director of the Centro Galego de Arte Contemporánea (CGAC, Santiago de Compostela), a post she held until 1998. She set up the centre and was instrumental in making it an international benchmark for contemporary artistic trends, organizing major retrospectives of Dan Graham, Vito Acconci, Medardo Rosso, Ana Mendieta, Félix Gonzalez-Torres, Giovanni Anselmo and Christian Boltanski, and special projects of Anish Kapoor and Juan Muñoz, among others.

From 1993 to 1997, she was a member of the management advisory committee of the Museo Nacional Centro de Arte Reina Sofía in Madrid (MNCARS).

From 2002 to 2008, she was a member of the Urban Project Assessment Commission of Barcelona City Council.

She served as Executive Vice President and Member of the Board of the Barcelona Institute of Architecture (BIArch) from 2010 to 2012, where she also taught.

For public spaces she has curated permanent projects such as Urban Configurations (1992) with works by Lothar Baumgarten, Rebecca Horn, Jannis Kounellis, Mario Merz, Juan Muñoz, Jaume Plensa, Ulrich Rückriem and James Turrell, in the context of the Barcelona Olympic Games and later, Forum 2004, with works by Cristina Iglesias, Tony Oursler and Eulàlia Valldosera at the Forum site in Barcelona.

She is currently associate editor at Ediciones Polígrafa, where she directs "20/21 Collection", a series of monographs dedicated to contemporary artists, for which she has published Marcel Broodthaers: Collected Writings (2012) An Art of Limina. Gary Hill’s Works and Writings (2009), Dan Graham’s Works and Writings (2009), Jeff Wall (2007), Robert Wilson (2003) and Sigmar Polke (2005), among others.

== Published books ==
- Marcel Broodthaers: Collected Writings, Ediciones Poligrafa, Barcelona, 2013.
- Dan Graham: Works and Collected Writings, Ediciones Poligrafa, Barcelona, 2009.
- Marcel Duchamp: Works, Writings, Interviews, Ediciones Polígrafa, Barcelona, 2009.
- Gordon Matta-Clark: Works and Collected Writings, Museo Nacional Centro de Arte Reina Sofía, Madrid; Ediciones Polígrafa, Barcelona, 2006.
- Sigmar Polke: Paintings, Photographs and Films, Ediciones Polígrafa, Barcelona, 2005.
- Fundació Espai Poblenou, Ajuntament de Barcelona; Ediciones Polígrafa, 2003.
- Tony Oursler, Ediciones Polígrafa, Barcelona, 2001.
- Jannis Kounellis: Works, Writings 1958-2000, Ediciones Polígrafa, 2001.
- Vito Acconci: Writings, Works, Projects, Ediciones Polígrafa, Barcelona, 2001.
- Richard Long, Spanish Stones, Ediciones Polígrafa, Barcelona, 1998.
- Antoni Tàpies, Objetos del Tiempo, Ediciones Polígrafa, Barcelona, 1994; Cercle d’Arts, Paris, 1995.
- Jannis Kounellis, Fundació Espai Poblenou, Barcelona; Ediciones Polígrafa, Barcelona; Editorial Rizzoli, Nueva York, 1990; Cercle d'Arts, Paris, 1991.
- Jan Dibbets, Fundació Espai Poblenou, Barcelona; Ediciones Polígrafa, Barcelona; Editorial Rizzoli, Nueva York, 1990.
- Marcel Duchamp, Ediciones Polígrafa, Barcelona, 1988; Thames and Hudson, London, 1988.
