= I'm Fine =

I'm Fine may refer to:

- I'm Fine (album), a 1987 album by Patty Larkin, or its title song
- I'm Fine (Burning Man installation), 2024
- I'm Fine (Thanks for Asking), a 2021 American indie film
- "I'm Fine", a song by Ashe from Ashlyn, 2021
- "I'm Fine", a song by BTS from Love Yourself: Answer, 2018
