= Blindspotting (EPs) =

2018 soundtrack albums

Blindspotting: The Collin EP and Blindspotting: The Miles EP were two musical projects curated by Republic Records for the 2018 film Blindspotting directed by Carlos López Estrada in his feature directorial debut and starred Daveed Diggs and Rafael Casal. The EPs were released in lieu of an official soundtrack album for the film and featured licensed songs from musicians around Oakland and Bay Area. The Collin EP was released first on July 13, 2018, while The Miles EP released on November 23.

== Background ==
The film’s soundtrack features dozens of licensed songs from Bay Area artists. To Diggs and Casal, it was important that the music used in the film be from the city. According to Diggs, "The sound of the city was as important as anything else. For us, maybe even more important because we have real input. We can make a music choice that we thought will add to the humanity of everything." Diggs and Casal even picked musicians from the area to perform on the score to find a sound that was specific to Oakland. Musicians, including drummer John Mader from Oakland, The Regiment Horns from Berkeley, and bassist Josh Hari from Oakland performed on the score.

Michael Yezerski composed the score, writing 21 original pieces. The music was divided into two sections: "song cues and psychological darker more traumatic cues". Yezerski added that to capture the grittiness and the texture of Oakland, the production sound mixer recorded the sounds in Oakland, such as the BART trains, traffic and cityscape, and used all the location sound recordings of BART trains and traffic sounds in the music. He described the sound as musical textures being put through musical filters and being matched with tones and layers which resulting in being part of the musical wall of sound. Yezerski said "there are points in the film where the music had to swell through these moments of extreme tension or psychological trauma". Tracking the emotions has been considered a challenging part, as the film starts as a buddy comedy which provided a lighter, funk-based score with the horns in the band show variety of sound, and changes to darker tone at the later part. He set up around 10–20 layers of instruments in the first cue and within 45 minutes, around three layers of instruments were used by putting musical filters, messing and distorting them by watching the visuals.

In lieu of a soundtrack album, two EPs were released. The Collin EP and The Miles EP are meant to represent both characters' perspectives, with Casal saying "It really felt like a way for people to drop into the music environment of the film. ... The spirit of each project is driven by being in the head or environment of the character." Several of the tracks include features by notable Bay Area artists, including Too $hort and T-Pain, and much of Diggs' and Casals' lyrics come from spoken word pieces they have performed in the past. The opening tracks on both EPs, "Commander Smiley" and "Commander Miles," were recorded for the film, but were ultimately cut. The only original tracks featured in the film are "In My City," "Running to the Sky," and "Not a Game," with the rest being exclusive to the soundtrack EPs.

Blindspotting additionally features several rap performances by Diggs and Casal, which were not included in the EPs. The freestyle at the film's climax was entirely written by Casal, and the word choice remained mostly unchanged for years.

== Albums ==
=== The Collin EP ===
Blindspotting: The Collin EP

EP / soundtrack album by Daveed Diggs
- Released: July 13, 2018
- Genre: Hip hop
- Length: 24:43
- Label: Republic Records
- Producer: Tiffany Gouché; Avereaux; Jessie I. James; David Stokes; Matthew Furdge; Samuel Kent Waldo; Marc Bamuthi Joseph; Jeffrey Baranowski

Singles from Blindspotting: The Collin EP
- 1. "Easy Come, Easy Go" Released: July 30, 2018

The Collin EP is described by Casal as being "little more cerebral, it’s if Collin were to think out loud". It was released on July 13, 2018, through Republic Records.

Blindspotting: The Collin EP track listing
No.	Title	Writer(s)	Producer(s)	Length
1.	"Commander Smiley" (featuring Rafael Casal)	Rafael Casal; Daveed Diggs		1:15
2.	"Easy Come, Easy Go" (Performed by Daveed Diggs and Rafael Casal)	Casal; Diggs	Tiffany Gouché; Avereaux	3:22
3.	"In My City" (featuring Mistah F.A.B. and Rafael Casal)	Stanley P. Cox; Casal; Diggs	Jessie I. James; David Stokes; Matthew Furdge	3:40
4.	"Chopped" (featuring Rafael Casal)	Casal; Diggs	Avereaux	4:32
5.	"Running to the Sky" (featuring Moe Green and Kiana Ledé)	Gregory Carter; Diggs; Kiana Ledé; Romika Faniel	James; Stokes; Samuel Kent Waldo	3:33
6.	"Not a Game" (featuring E-40, Rafael Casal, and Moe Green)	Earl T. Stevens; Casal; Diggs; Carter	James; Stokes; Furdge	3:24
7.	"Stories for Freedom" (Performed by Marc Bamuthi Joseph)	Marc Bamuthi Joseph	Marc Bamuthi Joseph	1:00
8.	"Something in the Water" (featuring Emmy Raver-Lampman)	Diggs	James; Stokes; Jeffrey Baranowski	3:57
Total length:				24:43

Chart performance for The Collin EP
Chart (2018)	Peak position
UK Albums (OCC)	25
UK R&B Albums (OCC)	17
US Top R&B/Hip-Hop Albums (Billboard)	28
US Soundtrack Albums (Billboard)	12

=== The Miles EP ===
Blindspotting: The Miles EP

EP / soundtrack album by Rafael Casal
- Released: November 23, 2018
- Genre: Hip hop
- Length: 26:52
- Label: Republic Records
- Producer: Jessie I. James; David Stokes; Rafael Casal; Ruwanga Samath; Avereaux; DSEP

Casal described The Miles EP as "trappier, 808 kind of music that the Bay Area is also known for that I imagine is what Miles drives around listening to. I imagine he's a little stoned, it’s a little angrier, a little grittier." Republic Records initially intended to release the album on August 10, 2018, but was delayed due to licensing issues. Later, the album was released on November 23. The song "Time & Distance" was removed from the album after its release, owing to the difficulties in acquiring license for that song.

Blindspotting: The Miles EP track listing
No.	Title	Writer(s)	Producer(s)	Length
1.	"Commander Miles" (featuring Daveed Diggs)	Rafael Casal; Daveed Diggs		1:27
2.	"Dope" (featuring Daveed Diggs and Too $hort)	Casal; Diggs; Todd Shaw	Jessie I. James; David Stokes	3:47
3.	"Thug Tho" (featuring Daveed Diggs)	Casal; Diggs	James; Stokes; Casal	4:02
4.	"Drippin" (featuring Daveed Diggs and SOB x RBE)	Casal; Diggs; Ruwanga Samath; Jabbar Kingston Brown Jr.; Juwon Lee; Wayman Barrow; George Harris III	Ruwanga Samath	3:39
5.	"Regulators" (featuring Daveed Diggs and T-Pain)	Casal; Diggs; Faheem Rashad Najm	James; Stoke	3:56
6.	"Time & Distance" (featuring Samaria)	Casal; Samaria Boykin
7.	"Fresh Squeeze" (featuring Avereaux, DSEP, and P-Lo)	Casal; Marco Di Marco; Roland Vengo; Daniel Bonifacio; Paolo Rodriguez	Avereaux; DSEP	3:27
8.	"Goals" (featuring Clyde Carson and Daveed Diggs)	Clyde Carson; Casal; Diggs	Casal	2:34
9.	"Soul Takers (2012)" (featuring Daveed Diggs)	Casal; Diggs	Casal	4:00
Total length:				26:52

Chart performance for The Miles EP
Chart (2018)	Peak position
UK Albums (OCC)	29
UK R&B Albums (OCC)	23
US Top R&B/Hip-Hop Albums (Billboard)	24
US Soundtrack Albums (Billboard)	18

=== The Town EP ===
A third project, The Town EP, had a planned August 10 release date (along with the original release date of The Miles EP), and was described as being "more anthemic in trying to represent a little more sense of the timeless sense of the town." The project was never released, however.
