= No Fate (Burning Man installation) =

2025 Burning Man art installation

- No Fate displayed at Burning Man
- Artists: Vitaliy Deynega, Oleksiy Sai, and other members of Ukrainian Witness
- Year: 2025
- Completion date: September 1, 2025
- Medium: Sculpture

No Fate is a 2025 art installation created by Ukrainian artists Vitaliy Deynega, Oleksiy Sai, and other members of Ukrainian Witness, a media project aiming to document the 2022 Russo-Ukrainian War. It was displayed at the Burning Man festival in Nevada, United States. The installation spells out "NO FATE", in reference to the line "There is no fate but what we make" from Terminator 2: Judgment Day. It was created from black Oxford fabric from Ukrainian Witness's original 2025 sculpture, Black Cloud, after it was destroyed in a major dust storm. According to Deynega, No Fate represents being able to take control of the future if someone is determined to change it.

== Background ==
No Fate was created by Ukrainian artists Oleksiy Sai, Vitalii Deynega, and other members of Ukrainian Witness. The installation was made out of salvaged pieces of Black Cloud, Ukrainian Witness's previous sculpture that was displayed at Burning Man. Black Cloud was destroyed on August 24, 2025, by a dust storm a few hours after it was set up. Deynega recalled that "It held against the wind for the first fifteen minutes, and then tore apart in the middle—the storm burst inside and destroyed it completely." Since the artists couldn't remake Black Cloud, they began figuring out how to instead use the moment. The idea for No Fate came from when the artists continuously quoted the phrase "There is no fate but what we make" from Terminator 2: Judgment Day during festival preparations. Deynega wrote on Facebook: "In fact, when we were thinking about this year's work, the image of Sarah Connor shouting this phrase to the world to warn of the danger and the need to stop it came to us very often."

== Description ==
No Fate was displayed at the Ukrainian camp at Burning Man on the final day of the festival, September 1, 2025, eight days after Black Cloud was destroyed. The installation spelt out "NO FATE" using pieces of cut up pieces of black Oxford fabric that appeared shredded and sagging. Il Foglio described the words as pen strokes being written on top of each other over and over.

DJ Anatoly Tapolsky performed a DJ set in front of No Fate, despite having broken his leg in the dust storm that destroyed Black Cloud. This was his second time performing with Ukrainian Witness at Burning Man, first playing a set in front of Ukrainian Witness's previous sculpture I'm Fine in 2024.

== Concept and themes ==
According to Suspilne Culture, No Fate carries the main theme of Black Cloud, representing that if people are determined and have a sense of agency, they can take control of the future and reshape it to whatever they want, regardless of any hardships they may face. The Ukrainians Media also suggests that when Black Cloud was remade into No Fate after its destruction, "a symbol of resistance emerge[d], one where destruction becomes a new beginning."

Deynega says that No Fate is a "harsh response to the concept of fatalism", believing that if Western countries do not start developing weapons and their military technology, "they might also soon hear a rifle butt knocking on their doors." Deynega also described Tapolsky's willingness to perform despite his injuries as representing the idea that it is more important how many times one gets back up than how many times one falls.

== See also ==
- Ukrainian art
- War art
