= Dope Thief =

2025 American crime drama TV series

- Promotional poster
- Genre: Crime drama
- Created by: Peter Craig
- Based on: Dope Thief by Dennis Tafoya
- Written by: Peter Craig
- Starring: Brian Tyree Henry; Wagner Moura; Marin Ireland; Amir Arison; Nesta Cooper; Kate Mulgrew; Ving Rhames
- Music by: Dominic Lewis
- Opening theme: "Point and Kill" by Little Simz feat. Obongjayar
- Country of origin: United States
- Original language: English
- No. of episodes: 8

Production
- Executive producers: Brian Tyree Henry; Jennifer Wiley-Moxley; Tanya Hamilton; Clayton Krueger; Jordan Sheehan; Richard Heus; Ridley Scott; David W. Zucker; Peter Craig
- Producers: Debra Lovatelli; Raymond Kirk; Marjorie Chodorov
- Cinematography: Erik Messerschmidt; Yaron Orbach; Eduardo Enrique Mayén
- Editors: Billy Rich; Jennifer Barbot; J. Kathleen Gibson; Eric Litman
- Production companies: Night Owl Stories; Scott Free Productions; Apple Studios

Original release
- Network: Apple TV+
- Release: March 14 – April 25, 2025

Dope Thief is an American crime drama television miniseries created by Peter Craig, based on the 2009 novel by Dennis Tafoya. It premiered on Apple TV+ on March 14, 2025.

== Premise ==
Two Philadelphia friends who pose as DEA agents to rob drug dealers face the consequences of their actions when they steal from an organized narcotics operation under surveillance by the actual DEA.

== Cast ==
=== Main ===
- Brian Tyree Henry as Ray Driscoll, a recovering addict and former drug dealer. He and his friend Manny exploit their knowledge of "the game" to rob dealers and support themselves.
- Wagner Moura as Manny Carvalho, Ray's childhood friend and partner who plans to settle down with his girlfriend Sherry
- Marin Ireland as Mina, a veteran DEA agent posing as a drug cook who survives a bullet to the throat during Ray's botched robbery
- Amir Arison as Mark Nader, a DEA supervisor in the Philadelphia office assigned to track down Ray.
- Nesta Cooper as Michelle Taylor, an ex-prosecutor and defense attorney hired by Theresa to arrange Bart's release
- Kate Mulgrew as Theresa Bowers, Bart's girlfriend and Ray's adoptive mother
- Ving Rhames as Bart Driscoll, Ray's cancer-stricken father and a notorious dealer who went to prison when Ray was a boy

=== Recurring ===
- Gabriel Ebert as Jack, an undercover DEA agent killed during the botched robbery
- Liz Caribel Sierra as Sherry, Manny's girlfriend
- Will Pullen as Marchetti, an DEA agent who works with Mina
- Idris Debrand as Teenage Ray
- Kaci Walfall as Marletta, Ray's deceased girlfriend, who was killed in a car accident while he was driving under the influence
- Dustin Nguyen as Son Pham, the son of South Vietnamese refugees and a well-connected drug trafficker. He gives Ray information on rival dealers. In return, Son resells the drugs Ray steals from them and lets Ray keep everything else like money, guns.
- Kiều Chinh as Xuan "Grandma" Pham, Son's mother

== Episodes ==
No.	Title	Directed by	Written by	Original release date
1	"Jolly Ranchers"	Ridley Scott	Peter Craig	March 14, 2025
In 2021, childhood friends Ray and Manny support themselves by impersonating DEA agents to rob low-level stash houses in Philadelphia. Ray learns that his adoptive mother, Theresa, needs $10,000 while a soon-to-be wed Manny is desperate to leave his criminal past behind. They recruit a fellow ex-convict, Rick, who suggests they could nab a larger score by robbing a methamphetamine lab in Ottsville; against his better judgement, Ray agrees. The robbery goes off the rails when a nervous Rick opens fire, and he and two meth cooks are killed before the lab catches fire and explodes. Ray and Manny escape with a large amount of cash and unprocessed meth, but a mysterious caller threatens to hunt them down. Mina, a survivor of the robbery, is an undercover DEA agent and informs her colleagues about the imposters.
2	"Bat Out of Hell"	Jonathan van Tulleken	Peter Craig	March 14, 2025
Ray sends Theresa to Atlantic City to get her out of town and visits his incarcerated father, Bart, who admits that he told a recently paroled inmate about his son's activities. Delivering the drugs to trusted trafficker Son Pham to resell, Ray stashes the money in a storage locker. He and Manny find the inmate and his Amish associates brutally slaughtered, and they are ambushed by bikers but manage to kill them. Realizing they have been identified by the mysterious caller, Manny ditches Ray to make sure his girlfriend, Sherry, is safe. Ray flees from more bikers until one is hit by a truck, and reluctantly meets with Michelle Taylor, a lawyer hired by Theresa to seek a compassionate release for Bart under state COVID-19 guidelines. Michelle reveals Bart is dying of cancer and Ray, despite his hatred for his father, agrees to pay her retainer.
3	"Run, Die, or Relapse"	Tanya Hamilton	Peter Craig	March 21, 2025
The DEA recovers plates from Ray's burned van and a gun used in the robbery; by tracking down the dealer it was stolen from, they obtain a composite sketch of Ray's face. Son abandons Ray to protect his own family and urges him to skip town, while the bikers interrogate and kill Ray's associate Malik. Theresa returns home against Ray's wishes and he admits the truth about his robbery scheme, before finding Manny hiding in his attic. Ray is forced to accompany Theresa to visit Bart, who has been stabbed in prison, and realizes the bikers have set an ambush for him. Before they can kill Ray, the bikers are arrested by local police. Manny begs for help reconciling with Sherry, who has threatened to turn him in, and Ray stops her by revealing Manny intends to propose to her. Outside, he finds a box with a threatening note and Malik's severed head.
4	"Philadelphia Lawyer"	Marcela Said	Peter Craig	March 28, 2025
Mina grieves the death of her partner, Jack, who was killed in the robbery and with whom she was having an affair. Struggling to regain her voice, she is determined to continue Jack's investigation into an "alliance" between the drug-dealing bikers and a Mexican cartel. Laying low at a motel with Theresa and Manny, who is using heroin to cope with his guilt, Ray convinces Sherry to stay away, and tracks down the bikers' meeting place. Son puts Ray in touch with an associate, Cyrus, but is targeted by the cartel and arrested by the DEA, who pressure Michelle to turn Ray in. Manny and Ray narrowly escape when Cyrus and his Juggalo gang are killed launching an attack on the bikers, and Ray stops a traumatized Manny from committing suicide with a grenade. Agreeing to meet with Michelle, Ray realizes he is walking into a DEA trap and slips away.
5	"Fear of God"	Marcela Said	Peter Craig	April 4, 2025
Son is forced by the DEA to call Ray, but gives him a secret warning not to incriminate himself. Mina meets Jack's wife, who knew about their affair, and contacts one of his informants using a code he kept on a $2 bill. Learning that Jack was actually working with the alliance, a distraught Mina calls a suicide hotline. Ray and Michelle give in to their mutual attraction, and he and Manny recover another $2 bill used by the murdered Amish, who are connected to a cartel stash. Son is released but continues to be threatened by the cartel. When Theresa defiantly returns home, Ray arrives to keep watch but is shot in the leg by a cartel sicario who demands the $2 code. Bart, newly paroled on house arrest, kills the gunman and saves his son.
6	"Love Songs from Mars"	Jonathan van Tulleken	Peter Craig	April 11, 2025
Bart, Theresa, and Manny struggle to help a wounded Ray, much to the confusion of the DEA, who have limited use of a listening device hidden in Bart's ankle monitor. Butting heads with her supervisor, Mark Nader, over Jack's extralegal activities and Ray's significance to their investigation, Mina confides in fellow agent Marchetti about her teenage daughter's death from a fentanyl overdose. Son arrives with his mother Xuan, a South Vietnamese refugee and wartime medic, to treat Ray, and Sherry reunites with Manny. A delirious Ray is haunted by memories of his late girlfriend, Marletta, and a cartel sniper fires on the house. Ray is taken to the hospital but ambushed by the bikers in an intense shootout. Manny rushes Ray inside and the bikers flee as the police arrive, but Bart is shot dead.
7	"Mussolini"	Marcela Said	Peter Craig	April 18, 2025
Weeks later, Theresa assists the DEA in luring the bikers into a sting operation, while Manny, Son, and a recovering Ray are all in custody. Manny learns Sherry is pregnant, and accepts the cartel's protection after the bikers try to have him killed. Michelle is still representing Ray but ends their romance, and is approached by Mina, who is fixated on Ray's connection to the larger drug trafficking operation. After an argument on the prison bus, Ray and Manny separately send Theresa and Sherry to collect the money, but they surprise each other at the storage unit. Ray wakes in the night to find his hospital floor empty and a nurse dead, and is taunted over the intercom by the mysterious caller, the alliance's unseen leader. Son survives an attempt on his life, and Michelle informs Ray that Manny has died from heroin given to him by the cartel.
8	"Innocent People"	Peter Craig	Peter Craig	April 25, 2025
After Manny's funeral, Marchetti discovers Son was being protected by someone inside the DEA and Mina confronts Ray, both agreeing to uncover the truth. DEA Special Agent Bill McKinty convinces his colleagues to listen to Ray, who deduces that the robbery was a setup: the $2 bills reveal coordinates where Jack hid the cartel stash, and Rick was sent to arrange the robbery and kill Jack. The alliance's leader demands a meeting with Son and Ray, who visits Michelle to say goodbye. As Son and the DEA take their positions, Ray, Mina, and Marchetti follow Jack's coordinates to a nearby graveyard where they uncover his stash: evidence proving McKinty is the alliance's leader, supplying Son and other criminals with stash houses protected by DEA "deconfliction". Marchetti races to warn the others, but McKinty kills Nader and his fellow agents to allow Son to escape with Xuan. Trapped in Mina's RV by McKinty and his bikers, Ray rams McKinty with the burning vehicle, killing the attackers when it explodes. Son leaves an apologetic voicemail for Ray, who has escaped with Mina and made a clean getaway.

== Production ==
It was announced in August 2022 that Sinking Spring, a TV series written by Peter Craig based on Dennis Tafoya's novel Dope Thief, would be produced for Apple TV+, with Brian Tyree Henry starring. Ridley Scott was set to direct the pilot episode, in addition to executive producing. Craig was also set to direct an episode. The cast, including Michael Mando, Marin Ireland and Kate Mulgrew, were announced in the following months. In January 2023, Amir Arison was cast, with Ving Rhames, Dustin Nguyen and Nesta Cooper among additional castings the following month. Kiều Chinh was cast in March.

Filming began in February 2023 in Philadelphia. Following an on-set altercation with another actor, Mando was fired, with Wagner Moura cast to replace him. On May 9, filming was halted due to the ongoing Writers Guild of America strike.

In November 2024, it was reported that the series' title had been changed from Sinking Spring to Dope Thief, and that the first two episodes were set to premiere on March 14, 2025.

== Reception ==
=== Critical response ===
Professional ratings
Aggregate scores
Source	Rating
Metacritic	74/100
Rotten Tomatoes	86%
Review scores
Source	Rating
The A.V. Club	B−
TV Guide	7.6/10

On the review aggregator website Rotten Tomatoes, Dope Thief has an approval rating of 87% based on 52 reviews, with an average rating of 7.1/10. The website's critics consensus reads, "Brian Tyree Henry and Wagner Moura might be punching below their weight with Dope Thief's derivative story, but that doesn't stop them from making this thriller a riveting ride." Metacritic, which uses a weighted average, assigned a score of 73 out of 100 based on 27 critics, indicating "generally favorable" reviews.

=== Accolades ===
Year	Award	Category	Nominee(s)	Result	Ref.
2025	Astra TV Awards	Best Limited Series	Dope Thief	Nominated	
2025	Astra TV Awards	Best Actor in a Limited Series or TV Movie	Brian Tyree Henry	Nominated	
2025	Gotham TV Awards	Outstanding Lead Performance in a Limited Series	Brian Tyree Henry	Nominated	
2025	Black Reel Awards	Outstanding TV Movie or Limited Series	Peter Craig	Nominated	
2025	Black Reel Awards	Outstanding Lead Performance in a TV Movie/Limited Series	Brian Tyree Henry	Nominated	
2025	Black Reel Awards	Outstanding Directing in a TV Movie or Limited Series	Tanya Hamilton	Nominated	
2025	Primetime Emmy Awards	Outstanding Lead Actor in a Limited or Anthology Series or Movie	Brian Tyree Henry	Nominated	
2025	Critics' Choice Awards	Best Limited Series	Dope Thief	Nominated	
2025	Critics' Choice Awards	Best Actor in a Limited Series or Movie Made for Television	Brian Tyree Henry	Nominated	
2025	Critics' Choice Awards	Best Supporting Actor in a Limited Series or Movie Made for Television	Wagner Moura	Nominated	
