= See (TV series) =

American science fiction drama TV series

- Genre: Action-adventure; Drama; Science fiction; Thriller
- Created by: Steven Knight
- Starring: Jason Momoa; Sylvia Hoeks; Hera Hilmar; Christian Camargo; Archie Madekwe; Nesta Cooper; Yadira Guevara-Prip; Alfre Woodard; Eden Epstein; Olivia Cheng; Hoon Lee; Tom Mison; Dave Bautista; David Hewlett; Michael Raymond-James
- Composer: Bear McCreary
- Country of origin: United States
- Original language: English
- No. of seasons: 3
- No. of episodes: 24

Production
- Executive producers: Francis Lawrence; Steven Knight; Peter Chernin; Jenno Topping; Jonathan Tropper; Kristen Campo
- Production locations: British Columbia, Canada; Ontario, Canada
- Camera setup: Single-camera
- Running time: 42–62 minutes
- Production companies: about:blank; Quaker Moving Pictures; Tropper Ink Productions (season 2); Chernin Entertainment; Endeavor Content; Nebula Star

Original release
- Network: Apple TV+
- Release: November 1, 2019 – October 14, 2022

See is an American science fiction drama television series produced for Apple TV+ and starring Jason Momoa and Alfre Woodard in leading roles. Set in a post-apocalyptic dystopia in the distant future where humanity's descendants have lost their sight, and the ability to see is considered to be a myth, the plot is set in motion by the birth of twin sighted children in a mountain tribe.

See was created by Steven Knight. Anders Engström directed a majority of the episodes. It also stars Sylvia Hoeks, Hera Hilmar, Christian Camargo, Archie Madekwe, Nesta Cooper, and Yadira Guevara-Prip. Executive producers include Knight, Lawrence, Peter Chernin, Jenno Topping, and Kristen Campo.

The series premiered on November 1, 2019, with a second season premiering on August 27, 2021. The third and final season premiered on August 26, 2022, and concluded on October 14, 2022.

== Premise ==
In the 21st century, a virus wiped out most of humanity. Fewer than two million people survived, and all their descendants have lost their sense of sight. See takes place several centuries later, by which time society has found new ways to socially interact, build, hunt, and survive without vision, albeit at a much lower economic level; humanity has returned to tribal hunter-gatherer and medieval-type societies. Knowledge of the old, sighted world has become lost or distorted; it is believed that materials such as metal, concrete, and plastic were created supernaturally by gods. The concept of vision has become a myth, and any mention of it is considered heresy.

See's action takes place in an area contested by two rivals: the Payan Kingdom (capital city: Kanzua) and the Trivantian Republic (capital city: Trivantes). In the mountains, a pregnant woman named Maghra seeks shelter with the Alkenny tribe. The Chief of the Alkenny, Baba Voss, who has been unable to father children, marries her and adopts her children. Their biological father, Jerlamarel, is wanted by the Queen of the Payan Kingdom for the heresy of being "sighted" (the natural ability to see). Word spreads of Jerlamarel siring children, prompting a witch hunt for Jerlamarel and his offspring. Baba Voss must protect both his family and his tribe against the Queen's army.

=== Locations ===
Although filmed in the Canadian provinces of British Columbia and Ontario, the plot takes place in what was Western Pennsylvania. Some key names and locations from the show—despite differences due to language change—can be identified:

- Alkenny – Alleghany
- Kanzua – Kinzua Dam
- Pennsa – State College
- Trivantes – Pittsburgh

== Cast and characters ==
=== Main ===
- Jason Momoa as Baba Voss, a fearless warrior and the leader of the Alkenny Tribe. He is the husband of Maghra, older brother of Edo Voss, and the adopted father of Kofun and Haniwa, children born with the now-dormant sense of sight. He places the safety of his family, friends, and tribe as a top priority to protect them from the Witchfinders.
- Sylvia Hoeks as Queen Sibeth Kane, the ruler of the Payan Kingdom and Maghra's older sister. She exercises her power ruthlessly and murders anyone who spreads heresy about the sense of sight.
- Hera Hilmar as Maghra Kane, who joined the Alkenny Tribe as a stranger, soon marrying Baba Voss. She is the younger sister of Sibeth and the mother of Kofun and Haniwa. Fiercely protective of her family, Maghra will do whatever is necessary to keep them alive.
- Christian Camargo as Tamacti Jun, the royal tax collector and Witchfinder General of the Payan army. A brilliant and violent soldier, he is tasked with finding those with sight, specifically the children of Jerlamarel.
- Archie Madekwe as Kofun, the son of Baba Voss and Maghra, and the biological son of Jerlamarel, who has the ability to see. Composed, careful and intelligent, he grows to be more cautious than his twin sister Haniwa.
- Nesta Cooper as Haniwa, the daughter of Baba Voss and Maghra, and the biological daughter of Jerlamarel, who also has the ability to see. Proud, determined, and strong, she grows to be more rebellious than her twin brother Kofun, and more curious about their true origins.
- Yadira Guevara-Prip as Bow Lion (season 1; guest seasons 2–3), a fierce ally of Baba Voss and a member of the Alkenny Tribe. She is the daughter of The Dreamer and possesses the skills of a "Shadow Warrior", having the rare ability to move undetected by sound or smell.
- Alfre Woodard as Paris (seasons 1–2), a wise elder member of the Alkenny Tribe. Her innate wisdom guides Baba Voss, especially in times of crisis, and she acts as a mother figure to him. She also serves as the shaman of the tribe.
- Eden Epstein as Wren (seasons 2–3), a smart and ambitious lieutenant, later captain, of the Trivantian army, who has the ability to see and is a close confidant of Edo Voss.
- Olivia Cheng as Charlotte (seasons 2–3), a fierce warrior from The Compass, a tribe tasked with protecting sighted children. She has no filter and is not shy about saying whatever is on her mind.
- Hoon Lee as Toad (season 2), a skilled Witchfinder soldier. He believes sight is evil, which has been ingrained in him since birth.
- Tom Mison as Lord Harlan (seasons 2–3), the fast-talking, smart, and cunning ruler of the city of Pennsa. He is the older brother of Kerrigan and a childhood friend of Maghra.
- Dave Bautista as Edo Voss (season 2), the vengeful younger brother of Baba Voss and the Commander General of the Trivantian army, the rival kingdom of Payan.
- David Hewlett as Tormada (season 3; guest season 2), the chief science officer of the Trivantian army who develops a new and devastating form of sighted weaponry.
- Michael Raymond-James as Ranger (season 3), a childhood friend of Baba from Trivantes, now living as a nomad in the Northern Mountains.

=== Recurring ===
- Tantoo Cardinal as The Dreamer (season 1), an elder member of the Alkenny Tribe and the mother of Bow Lion.
- Mojean Aria as Gether Bax (season 1), an untrustworthy member of the Alkenny Tribe and the nephew of Souter Bax.
- Marilee Talkington as Souter Bax (season 1), a member of the Alkenny Tribe and the aunt of Gether Bax.
- Bree Klauser as Matal (season 1), a member of the Alkenny Tribe and a "Presage", someone with an extrasensory ability to feel emotions.
- Luc Roderique as Arca (season 1), the quartermaster of the Alkenny Tribe. Arca is loyal to Baba Voss.
- Peter James Bryant as Lord Dune (season 1), one of Sibeth Kane's advisors and a member of the ruling council of Payan.
- Hiro Kanagawa as Lord Unoa (season 1), the royal physician of Payan.
- Lauren Glazier as Nyrie (season 1), the loyal lady-in-waiting of Sibeth Kane.
- Franz Drameh as Boots (season 1; guest season 2), a mysterious former member of a scavenger tribe. He is also a son of Jerlamarel and has the ability to see.
- Timothy Webber as Cutter (season 1), a slave owner who controls a silk manufacturing operation that supplies the nobles of Payan.
- Jessica Harper as Cora (season 1; guest season 2), a slave who worked at Cutter's silk farms, until she later gains her freedom.
- Dayo Okeniyi as Oloman (season 2; guest seasons 1, 3), the oldest of Jerlamarel's sighted children and his right hand. He is also a proficient engineer.
- Alex Breaux as Dax (season 2), a Witchfinder serving under Toad.
- Adam Morse as Frye (season 2), a Witchfinder serving under Toad.
- Luke Humphrey as Kerrigan (season 2), Lord Harlan's younger brother and close advisor.
- Martin Roach as Captain Gosset (seasons 2–3), the commander of the military forces in Pennsa.
- Nina Kiri as Harmony (season 2; guest season 3), a servant in Pennsa who attends to both Sibeth & Maghra Kane.
- Adrian Groulx as Rockwell (season 2), a young child of Jerlamarel who was gifted to Edo Voss so he can take advantage of sight in combat.
- Joe Flanigan as The Military (season 2; guest season 3), a member of the triumvirate that rules The Trivantians who commands the army.
- Mainei Kinimaka as Belu (season 3; guest season 1), also known as Lu, she is a member of the Alkenny Tribe and a "Kill Dancer", an expert martial artist.
- Tamara Tunie as Nevla/ The Bank (season 3; guest season 2), a member of the triumvirate that rules The Trivantians who controls the finances and economics.
- Dean Jagger as Lucien Bray (season 3), a former Witchfinder with a strong hatred of the sighted who openly rebels against his Queen.
- Trieste Kelly Dunn as Ambassador Trovere (season 3), the new representative of The Trivantians, replacing Scopus, and a former lover of Lord Harlan.
- Murry Peeters as Shiloh (season 3), a former Witchfinder and Lucien's second-in-command.
- Matthew G. Taylor as Lieutenant Maddox (season 3), a high-ranking soldier in the Trivantian army who is loyal to Tormada.

=== Guest ===
- Sharon Taylor as Ilun (season 1), a member of the Alkenny Tribe and a "Ayura", someone with an enhanced sense of hearing.
- Brianna Clark as Sinjay (season 1), a member of the Alkenny Tribe and a midwife who helps Maghra give birth.
- Joshua Henry as Jerlamarel (seasons 1–2), a heretic and preacher of sight. He is the biological father of Kofun, Haniwa, Boots, and many other sighted children.
- Aleks Paunovic as Wech (season 1), a notorious slaver who preys upon vulnerable tribes.
- Gabrielle Rose as Lady An (season 1), one of Sibeth Kane's advisors and a member of the ruling council of Payan.
- Kyra Zagorsky as Delia (season 1), a former lover of Jerlamarel and Boot's mother.
- Damaris Lewis as Sheva, one of Jerlamarel's sighted children who acts as his advisor.
- Raven Scott as Nonni (seasons 1, 3), one of Jerlamarel's sighted children.
- Eddie McGee as Yakis (season 2), a blacksmith working in Trivantes and an old friend of Baba Voss.
- James Immekus as The People (seasons 2–3), a member of the triumvirate that rules The Trivantians who speaks for the civilians of the capital city, Trivantes.
- David Eisner as Ambassador Scopus (season 2), the representative of The Trivantians.

== Episodes ==
Season	Episodes	Originally released	
Season	Episodes	First released	Last released
1	8	November 1, 2019	December 6, 2019
2	8	August 27, 2021	October 15, 2021
3	8	August 26, 2022	October 14, 2022

=== Season 1 (2019) ===
No. overall	No. in season	Title	Directed by	Written by	Original release date
1	1	"Godflame"	Francis Lawrence	Steven Knight	November 1, 2019
In a dystopian future where humans have lost the sense of sight, two babies are born to Maghra—a newcomer to the Alkenny tribe, which lives in a lush forest landscape. Meanwhile, Queen Kane—the ruler of the city of Kanzua, has ordered Tamacti Jun, General of the Witchfinder army, to hunt down "witches"—those who promote the concept of vision or spread the knowledge of Jerlamarel, a man who can see. At the Alkenny settlement, tribe leader Baba Voss—the adopted father of the babies and Maghra's husband—prepares the village for battle against the Witchfinder army. Tribe member Gether Bax betrays the Alkenny by disclosing the location of the settlement to Tamacti Jun, and mentioning rumors that the babies' father is Jerlamarel. Baba Voss and the Alkenny engage in a bloody battle to defend the settlement. With their location compromised and the Witchfinder army now in pursuit, Baba Voss and Paris follow Jerlamarel's clues and lead the Alkenny to a newly discovered bridge which provides them passage out of the valley. Baba Voss destroys the bridge preventing their pursuers from following. After many days of travel, the Alkenny find a new area to create a settlement.
2	2	"Message in a Bottle"	Francis Lawrence	Steven Knight	November 1, 2019
While hunting in the forest, Baba Voss is attacked by a bear. He is saved by Jerlamarel, who asks Baba Voss to raise his children and keep them safe until they are old enough to receive a box containing "knowledge". Baba Voss retrieves the box, which contains dozens of books. Meanwhile, Gether Bax continues to stoke discontent towards Voss' leadership. He and his aunt Souter Bax secretly enlist another tribe member – Bow Lion, acting as a Shadow (a person skilled in obtaining information covertly), to spy on Paris. Maghra, Baba Voss and Paris discover that the babies—now named Kofun and Haniwa—can see and agree not to speak of the discovery again for twelve summers. Bow Lion tells Gether Bax that Paris and Baba Voss only talk of typical baby things. Gether thinks she may be lying to him, and sends a message in a bottle down river hoping it will reach the Witchfinder. Twelve summers later, Paris goes against Maghra's wishes and informs Kofun and Haniwa that Jerlamarel is their real father and provides them with the box of books.
3	3	"Fresh Blood"	Francis Lawrence	Steven Knight and Hadi Nicholas Deeb	November 1, 2019
After years of gaining knowledge and skills from Jerlamarel's books, Kofun and Haniwa reach the verge of adulthood. Over those years, Witchfinder General Tamacti Jun has failed to locate them. Returning to Queen Kane, he requests to kill himself and avoid execution as punishment for his failure. Queen Kane receives Gether Bax' message reporting the location of the Alkenny and decides to order Tamacti Jun to once again hunt down the children. At the Alkenny's settlement, Gether and Souter Bax' incestuous relationship results in a stillborn and disfigured child. In response, Baba Voss, Maghra and Paris along with several younger Alkenny seek out a nearby festival to encourage their people to seek partners from outside their tribe. Unknown to them, Kofun and Haniwa follow behind. At the festival, the group discover the Witchfinder's rumors of witches have spread and innocent people are being burned alive. After Kofun is captured by slave traders, the group track them to a former mining quarry. Ashamed, Baba Voss reveals he used to be a slaver, before carrying out a violent rescue of Kofun. The tribe return to the Alkenny settlement to discover the Witchfinder army on the verge of mounting an attack.
4	4	"The River"	Anders Engström	Steven Knight and Hadi Nicholas Deeb	November 8, 2019
As the Witchfinder army invades the Alkenny settlement, Baba Voss, Maghra, Paris, Kofun and Haniwa escape with Bow Lion. Baba Voss leads the group to a river and a raft he had secretly constructed. Gether Bax leads the Witchfinders to the river in pursuit of the group. In the ensuing fight, Haniwa kills Gether Bax and the tribe escape downriver. Meanwhile, Queen Kane's parliament convenes and expresses frustration at the number of resources being used to locate Jerlamarel's children. Shortly after, two parliament members—Lord Dune and Lady An, conspire to murder Queen Kane. The plot is overheard by the Queen's lady-in-waiting Nyrie who later discloses it. Back at the river, Paris reveals a final letter to Kofun and Haniwa from Jerlamarel. The letter provides directions to his location. The group vote in favor of following Jerlamarel's instructions but discover their belongings missing the next morning. Maghra frets over an item belonging to her father and instructs Baba to find it. With the help of Nyrie, Queen Kane executes Lord Dune and Lady An. With her followers rising up against her, Queen Kane destabilizes the Kanzua dam causing the structure to collapse and flooding the village.
5	5	"Plastic"	Anders Engström	Teleplay by : Steven Knight and Jonathan E. Steinberg; Story by : Steven Knight and Soo Hugh	November 15, 2019
As the valley floods, Queen Kane and Nyrie escape. Two Shadow Warriors later attack Queen Kane, Nyrie and her driver. Only Queen Kane survives; she is captured and taken to the City of Worms, a nearby silk manufacturing settlement. Unaware of her true identity, the settlement's leader, Cutter, forces Queen Kane into slavery. At the river, Baba Voss, Kofun and Haniwa search for the missing items and locate a scavenger settlement nearby. Haniwa enters it, finds the items and meets Boots, the lone occupant . Boots is another of Jerlamarel's young children and is able to see. He pledges his loyalty to Baba Voss on the condition that he can join the group in their journey. Haniwa returns the small bag to Maghra. The Witchfinder army locate the group once again. Forced to retreat into the forest, Maghra and Paris take shelter while Baba Voss and the rest of the group fight off their pursuers. Maghra comes out of hiding and confronts Tamacti Jun. The item inside Maghra's bag is revealed to be a ring worn only by royalty. Upon recognizing the sound of the ring's rattle, Tamacti Jun bows before Maghra, addressing her as Princess Maghra of House Kane.
6	6	"Silk"	Stephen Surjik	Steven Knight and Jonathan E. Steinberg & Dan Shotz	November 22, 2019
Years earlier, Maghra's dying father, the former King of House Kane, chose her as his successor over her older sister. Tamacti Jun's deciding vote saw Queen Kane emerge as monarch instead. At the City of Worms, a slave named Cora befriends Queen Kane, who reveals her royal status in confidence. Cora is actually acting on Cutter's orders to gain information. Cutter later removes a royal amulet embedded within Queen Kane's chest. At the river, Boots falsely claims that he witnessed Maghra's death and betrays the group by leading them to a cave where they are held in captivity. A woman claiming to be Boots' mother offers to help the group escape on the condition that Boots is killed due to his past actions. Baba Voss fights off their captors, allowing the others to reach the surface, before escaping himself. Nearby, Boots allows himself to be taken captive by the Witchfinder army and is taken to Maghra. Cutter sends a ransom note to Tamacti Jun mentioning the Queen's imprisonment, along with the royal amulet as proof of her identity. Boots requests that Maghra let him serve as her lieutenant and offers to track down her sister.
7	7	"The Lavender Road"	Frederick E.O. Toye	Steven Knight and Robert Levine	November 29, 2019
Tamacti Jun tortures the messengers from the City of Worms to reveal its location, having captured them with the help of Boots. Leaving behind soldiers to search for Maghra's family, Tamacti Jun takes Maghra, Boots, and the rest of his army to rescue Queen Kane. Locating the City of Worms, Tamacti Jun sends Boots to scout the area, then uses the information to infiltrate the site himself. After killing the guards, he finds the injured Queen, who has been helped by Cora during the commotion to overpower Cutter and strangle him with her chains. Maghra comes to aid her sister, who deduces her identity. Queen Kane reveals that she destroyed the dam at Kanzua as she fled to kill her opposers. Angry at her actions, Tamacti Jun considers whether Maghra would be a more suitable replacement as monarch. Meanwhile, the others locate the route to Jerlamarel's location. The group meet resistance whilst attempting to cross a mountain pass and Bow Lion is injured. Kofun and Haniwa reveal themselves as the children of Jerlamarel, but only they are permitted to pass through the bridge to the House of Enlightenment.
8	8	"House of Enlightenment"	Salli Richardson-Whitfield	Steven Knight and Jonathan Tropper	December 6, 2019
At the House of Enlightenment (a former prison converted into a settlement with electricity, hot water and an extensive library), Jerlamarel introduces the twins to their other siblings. Jerlamarel views himself as a savior of mankind, chosen by God to bring vision back to the world. Kofun eventually overhears Jerlamarel discussing the handover of the twins to a Colonel from the Trivantian tribe who acts on behalf of a General seeking Baba Voss's children. Jerlamarel agrees to only hand over Haniwa. Kofun is discovered and imprisoned. Jerlamarel later orders guards to execute Kofun, whom Baba Voss eventually saves. Kofun shuts down the generator, while Baba Voss discovers that Jerlamarel handed Haniwa over to General Edo Voss, his brother. Baba blinds Jerlamarel before escaping with Kofun and reuniting with Paris. At the City of Worms, aided by Boots, the Queen kills Tamacti Jun. Announcing that Tamacti Jun committed suicide, Maghra and Queen Kane address the Witchfinder army as joint rulers. Maghra orders that the army head to the Lavender Road to look for her family. Meanwhile, Baba Voss, Kofun and Paris come across a city and vow to save Haniwa.

=== Season 2 (2021) ===
No. overall	No. in season	Title	Directed by	Written by	Original release date
9	1	"Brothers and Sisters"	Simon Cellan-Jones	Jonathan Tropper	August 27, 2021
Edo Voss is holding Haniwa captive in Trivantes, Baba's former home. Wren, Edo's top lieutenant, is placed in charge of guarding Haniwa and, unbeknownst to others, is sighted. Baba sneaks into Trivantes and seeks help from an old friend, Yakis, to learn where Haniwa is being held. While attempting to rescue Haniwa, Baba is tricked by those helping him. He initially fights his way out of an ambush, but is seen by a sighted boy and then captured by Edo. In Pennsa, Queen Kane names the city as the new Payan capital, usurping Lord Harlan from his own home. Maghra who knew Harlan when they were children tries to quell his doubts about how Kanzua was destroyed. Queen Kane falsely proclaims that the Trivantian Republic destroyed Kanzua, and vows to go to war with Trivantes. She is pregnant and declares that the child will be sighted and that the prophesied "chosen one" will lead Payan to victory as the region's dominant kingdom. Consequently, she declares that sighted people are no longer witches, which upsets some of her subjects. Meanwhile, Witchfinder soldiers find Kofun and intend to return him to his mother, leaving Paris behind.
10	2	"Forever"	Frederick E.O. Toye & Anders Engström	Stephen Tolkin	September 3, 2021
Baba remains captured in the Trivantian capital and is being continuously whipped in the dungeon. In his cell, Baba encounters Tamacti Jun, also imprisoned in Trivantes after surviving the attack on him by Queen Kane and Boots. Tamacti Jun reveals that Princess Maghra lives and is with Queen Kane. Wren shows Haniwa around the city and takes Haniwa to her secret place filled with art and books. Baba is tortured by Edo's men and then paraded around the city before they plan to execute him. Haniwa is moved to another location. Wren decides to help Baba escape and they go searching for Haniwa. Wren frees Haniwa while Edo and Baba fight one another. In Pennsa, Queen Kane tells Maghra that she is to marry Lord Harlan. Maghra protests and says that she is married to Baba. Haniwa rescues Baba from Edo, who then frees Tamacti Jun to help them escape the city. Wren declines Haniwa's request to join them and stays behind. Boots discovers that Queen Kane has murdered Cora after being told she had a miscarriage. Queen Kane then kills Boots despite his pleas to let them try for another child.
11	3	"The Compass"	Frederick E.O. Toye & Anders Engström	Shelley Meals	September 10, 2021
The triumvirate calls Edo's leadership into question. Edo commands Wren to find the traitor who helped Baba, Tamacti Jun, and Haniwa escape. After escaping, the three continue to look for Kofun, and plan to reunite with Maghra. Lord Harlan, in the presence of Queen Kane, questions Palace Sentry Zechan about what happened to Kanzua. Zechan says that the Trivantians did not attack Kanzua and suspects that Queen Kane destroyed the city as the people were turning against her. Harlan then kills Zechan. Queen Kane tells Princess Maghra to marry Lord Harlan, claiming that her son, Kofun, will not be safe if she does not comply. Maghra agrees as long as Harlan understands that the marriage will not be consummated. Paris, along with people from The Compass (guardians sworn to save the sighted), save Haniwa, Baba and Tamacti Jun from Slavers. Paris tells Haniwa that she was a Compass Guardian. She was given the job of protecting a child - Jerlameral, Haniwa's birth father. Jerlameral fled from Paris with the books and coded ropes. Paris felt that she had failed The Compass and left them. Witch hunters Axe, Dax and Frye try to kill Kofun, but witch hunter Toad saves him.
12	4	"The Witchfinder"	Anders Engström	Jennifer Yale	September 17, 2021
Kofun and Toad arrive in Pennsa as Maghra's wedding day to marry Lord Harlan is to commence. Kofun begs his mother, Maghra, not to marry, but she tells him she will explain everything later and is doing this for their protection. Maghra instructs Kofun to remain in her room during the marriage ceremony, but he sneaks out to witness this travesty against his father, Baba Voss. After the wedding, Queen Kane approaches Kofun and makes flirtatious innuendos towards him. With Baba feverish, he Haniwa and Paris make their way to the village of Valier. Tamacti Jun remains behind as he had previously caused much harm to the village. Baba, Paris, and Haniwa run into trusted friend, Bow Lion, who is now practicing to be a healer. Meanwhile, not knowing that Haniwa is now with Baba, Princess Maghra seeks out Lord Harlan to hire his brother, Kerrigan, to go rescue Haniwa from Trivantes. Baba and his group head to Pennsa.
13	5	"The Dinner Party"	Anders Engström	Kirsa Rein	September 23, 2021
Queen Kane convenes her council to assess their army's strength against the Trivantians. Princess Maghra and Lord Harlan conspire for peace with the Trivantians, seeking an apology for the City of Kanzua's attack. Kofun seeks to be trained by Toad to protect his family. Lieutenant Wren, appointed as an ambassador, persuades Edo Voss to seek peace with the Payan people. Tamacti Jun locates Princess Maghra in the palace, while Baba's family reunites. Queen Kane feigns warmth, revealing plans to send Maghra as an ambassador to Trivantes. Lord Harlan warns of the consequences of their secret marriage. Maghra discovers Baba's scars, remnants of his efforts to rescue Haniwa. Tamacti Jun informs Toad of his survival. Paris overhears skepticism about the Queen's views on the sighted. Toad relays a message to Maghra, pledging to protect Kofun. Maghra, Baba, and Toad meet Tamacti Jun, instructing him to gather Witchhunters. Harlan receives Kerrigan's head, causing him to have a breakdown. Queen Kane shares her vulnerability with Kofun, aiming to gain his trust, and for him to impregnate her.
14	6	"The Truth About Unicorns"	Anders Engström	Nelson Greaves	October 1, 2021
Princess Maghra, Lord Harlan, and Baba embark on a peace summit with the Trivantians. Paris foresees betrayal and bloodshed. Edo Voss appoints Wren as a captain to influence the Payan delegation. Toad trains Kofun in combat and self-defense. Queen Kane bonds with Kofun during a horse ride, expressing gratitude for her newfound freedom. Haniwa catches up with the group, warning them about Paris' vision. Lord Harlan arranges a secret meeting with Trivantian Ambassador Scopus for peaceful negotiations. Queen Kane invites Kofun to a private dinner, introducing him to the hallucinatory Thornflower. Confused, Kofun has sex with the Queen. Queen Kane forges a secret pact with Kofun. Haniwa and Wren share a night of intimacy. Paris' vision unfolds with a Payan assassin attack, leaving Wren as the sole survivor—she accuses Haniwa of betrayal and leaves for Trivantes. Queen Kane, fearing impending danger, seeks solace with Kofun, spending the night in his bed. The next day, Maghra confronts the Queen upon her return, throwing a meal in anger.
15	7	"The Queen's Speech"	Anders Engström	Jamie Chan	October 8, 2021
Queen Kane's war declaration against the Trivante people prompts Maghra to act. Tamacti Jun exposes the Queen's atrocities, leading to calls for Maghra and Tamacti Jun's arrest. Harlan intervenes, revealing the Queen's deceit and rallying support against her. Tamacti Jun's plan to behead Kane is thwarted by Paris, who discloses the Queen's pregnancy. Kane is confined to house arrest. Wren, guided by her sight, aids the Trivantians in capturing Woodvale and advances towards Pennsa with sighted soldiers. Maghra, Captain Gosset, Baba, and Tamacti Jun strategize against the approaching Trivante army. Haniwa unveils Trivantes' use of sighted soldiers, leading to a plan to meet at the Greenhill Gap fortress. Kofun and Haniwa pledge to join the Payan army. Edo Voss hires an assassin. Maghra, preparing for battle, is stopped by Tamacti Jun, emphasizing her leadership role. Tamacti Jun leads the Payan army, with Harlan, Kofun, and Haniwa in tow. Paris invites Toad on a secret journey. An assassin targets Maghra, but Harlan intervenes, causing the assassin's demise. The Trivantian army, unexpectedly larger, approaches Greenhill Gap. Haniwa pleads for peace with Wren, to no avail.
16	8	"Rock-a-Bye"	Anders Engström	Jonathan Tropper	October 15, 2021
Haniwa rushes back to Greenhill Gap, securing the gates for battle. Tamacti Jun sends a rider to Queen Maghra, advising evacuation of the city. Paris joins other hidden tribes, pledging loyalty to Baba Voss. Maghra confronts Sibeth, learning that Kofun is the child's father. Determined to raise the child as her own, Maghra plans to take custody of it upon delivery. Baba delivers an inspiring speech before leading the Payan army to an epic battle, ultimately victorious despite Toad's sacrifice. Wren survives a frozen river trap and escapes. After the battle, Baba faces Edo in a final confrontation, achieving a form of reconciliation as he defeats him. Haniwa urges Wren to stay, but she chooses her Trivante family. Paris mourns Toad, and the successful Payan army returns to Pennsa. Reunited, Baba, Kofun, and Haniwa join Maghra. Queen Maghra releases the Witchfinder Army from service vows, appointing Tamacti Jun as High General of the Payan Army and former Witchfinders to Payan's Royal Guard. Oloman demonstrates his explosives to the Trivantian Commander. Baba bids a silent farewell to his sleeping family before leaving Pennsa. Paris checks on the pregnant Sibeth, who murders Paris, warning against any attempts to take her child.

=== Season 3 (2022) ===
No. overall	No. in season	Title	Directed by	Written by	Original release date
17	1	"Heavy Hangs the Head"	Anders Engström	Jonathan Tropper & Jennifer Yale	August 26, 2022
In a prolonged conflict at the Trivantian-Ganite border, Wren and a dwindling Trivantian company face overwhelming Ganite forces, leading to a strategic retreat to their base. Meanwhile, in Pennsa, Queen Kane undergoes a challenging birth attended by Maghra, with tensions escalating over the fate of the newborn. The Trivantes army contends with the Ganite invasion, with Tormada unveiling a devastating weapon. In Pennsa, societal tensions rise, and Haniwa witnesses an anti-sighted demonstration. In the mountains, Baba immerses himself in a lifestyle shaped by his surroundings.
18	2	"Watch Out for Wolves"	Anders Engström	Kate Erickson and Jennifer Yale	September 2, 2022
Following the tragic explosion, Baba mourns the loss of Bow Lion and resolves to journey to Pennsa to warn Maghra about the Trivantians' presence and their powerful weapons. Maghra and Tamacti Jun learn about the burning of Row Vano and the impending capture of Haniwa. Amidst political discussions, Tamacti Jun confronts the Witchfinders, defeating Lucien in a duel. Meanwhile, facing a fatal assault, Wren collaborates with Oloman to destroy Trivantian bombs, orchestrating a bold and audacious escape. In Pennsa, Kofun grapples with fatherhood, discovering Wolffe's blindness. Maghra faces emotional turmoil, promising Sibeth to Trovere, and Baba seeks justice for Paris, encountering unexpected challenges.
19	3	"This Land Is Your Land"	Anders Engström	Adam Stein and Jonathan Tropper	September 9, 2022
Fearing the peace treaty with Trivantes is in jeopardy, Maghra, Tamacti Jun, and Harlan strategize to discreetly capture Sibeth. The imprisoned Haniwa and Baba discuss recent events. Baba breaks out, while Lucien spreads propaganda about the Witchfinders. Kofun, Charlotte, and Baba confront personal challenges. Trovere and Harlan plan to expose Tormada's schemes. Wren reveals vital information about Tormada and the God Thunder weapons. A plan is devised to destroy the bombs, and tensions rise in Pennsa. Tamacti Jun makes another effort to suppress the insurgency led by the Witchfinders. Baba and Maghra contemplate their family's future. Sibeth escapes, resulting in a tragic confrontation that profoundly alters the dynamics.
20	4	"The Storm"	Anders Engström	Dagny Looper and Nelson Greaves	September 16, 2022
On the run, Sibeth evades Pennsa forces using clever tactics. Baba guides Charlotte, Kofun, Haniwa, and Wren to The House of Enlightenment with the intention of obliterating Tormada's arsenal. In Trivantes, Tormada unveils his latest weaponry before The Triangle; Harlan and Trovere plot against him. Baba reveals Ranger's past with Tormada, leading to a clash at the House of Enlightenment. Meanwhile, Sibeth faces challenges in the wilderness, hallucinating about Maghra. In Pennsa, Maghra mobilizes for the impending threat, facing resistance from the Council and Witchfinders. Sibeth's path takes an unexpected turn towards the Council.
21	5	"The House of Enlightenment"	Anders Engström	Adam Benic and Jennifer Yale	September 23, 2022
Looking for alliances, Sibeth endeavors to recruit the Witchfinders, leveraging her status as the Godflame's chosen Queen. Baba Voss and his group take refuge in the House of Enlightenment, where they confront the revelation that Harlan has pledged his allegiance to the Trivantian forces. Tormada discovers the absence of the sighted children, who are crucial for bomb production. The group opts to warn Pennsa rather than directly engage the Trivantian forces. Amidst confrontations and tactical moves, a betrayal occurs, leading to a fiery symbolic act.
22	6	"The Lowlands"	Anders Engström	Karl Taro Greenfeld and Nelson Greaves	September 30, 2022
Maghra and Tamacti Jun confront the Witchfinder threat after discovering dead Council members. Harlan proposes a risky plan to warn Maghra of Tormada's impending attack, leading Baba's group through the lowlands. In Trivantes, Tormada and Bank conspire to destroy Pennsa. Meanwhile, Sibeth and the Witchfinders ambush Tormada's forces, initiating discussions about the impending bomb threat. Harlan and Wren are kidnapped, setting off a chain of events that includes a brutal confrontation at a cannibal camp and Harlan sacrificing himself to ensure Pennsa's warning. Kofun faces danger while Sibeth and Tormada prepare for the assault.
23	7	"God Thunder"	Anders Engström	Jennifer Yale and Jonathan Tropper	October 7, 2022
Kofun is captured by Sibeth, objecting to her destructive plans. Maghra and Tamacti Jun discuss the Witchfinders and brace for the Trivantian attack. Tormada and Sibeth launch a devastating bomb attack on Pennsa, killing and wounding thousands. Maghra, knocked unconscious, dreams of her past with Baba. No rescues Maghra and Wolffe. Sibeth and Kofun share conflicted emotions. Tormada's attempt at an alliance with Kofun fails. Maghra, prioritizing the wounded, dreams of her Alkenny past. Haniwa reveals Harlan's death. Kofun warns Pennsa. Maghra discovers a map leading to tunnels that can be used to evacuate the city's most vulnerable. The family resolves to face the impending danger.
24	8	"I See You"	Anders Engström	Jonathan Tropper	October 14, 2022
Pennsa is devastated by Tormada's bombs, and Maghra, torn between aiding Baba or remaining in the tunnels, faces a crucial decision. Baba and Ranger infiltrate Sibeth's camp to eliminate the bombs, while tension rises in the tunnels. Kofun survives a cave-in, and the group contemplates fighting back. Baba and Ranger confront Trivantian forces, and Maghra reaches Sibeth. The sisters reminisce, but Maghra ultimately kills Sibeth. Tormada orders Maghra's execution, but Tamacti Jun intervenes. In a final heroic act, Baba sacrifices himself, destroying the bombs. Time passes, and Pennsa rebuilds. Maghra, now working for peace, contemplates Baba's sacrifice. The narrative extends to Haniwa's marriage, Kofun's potential kingship, and a reunion of Lu and Ranger, concluding with Haniwa and Wren leaving for a new life with other sighted individuals.

== Production ==
=== Development ===
On January 10, 2018, it was announced that Apple had given the production a series order for an eight-episode season. The series was written by Steven Knight and directed by Francis Lawrence, both of whom also executive produced alongside Peter Chernin, Jenno Topping, and Kristen Campo. Production companies involved with the series consisted of Chernin Entertainment and Endeavor Content.

Lawrence, Knight, the show's writers, and the art and prop departments worked with blindness consultants, an evolutionary biologist, and a survivalist on worldbuilding See, brainstorming about how societies would develop and function under such conditions.

On November 7, 2019, Apple ordered a second season of the series. In June 2021, Apple announced the show was to be renewed for a third season. In June 2022, it was announced that the third season consisting of eight episodes would conclude the series. The final season premiered on August 26, 2022, and concluded on October 14, 2022.

=== Casting and preproduction ===
A July 2018 announcement revealed that Jason Momoa and Alfre Woodard had been cast in series regular roles, followed by news that Yadira Guevara-Prip, Nesta Cooper, Sylvia Hoeks, and Archie Madekwe had joined the main cast a month later. On October 18, 2018, it was reported that Christian Camargo and Hera Hilmar had been cast in series regular roles.

Before filming began, the cast — which mostly consisted of sighted actors — underwent a month of rigorous "blindness training" with blindness coach Joe Strechay. (Strechay was promoted to a co-producer of the show in season 2.) The actors — sometimes wearing sleep shades — learning how to move sightlessly and to develop their other senses, including the rudimentary ability to echolocate. The goal was to also avoid common clichés of blindness, such as characters constantly feeling each other's faces. The actors were also trained by movement director Paradox Pollack.

A few blind and low-sighted actors were cast in supporting roles, including Bree Klauser and Marilee Talkington, with the goal to increase that number in later seasons. Blind actor Adam Morse had a small role in season 2 as Frye, a Witchfinder serving under the character Toad.

Oliver Rae Aleron and Spencer Prewett from Archspire appear in a cameo in the first episode.

In January 2020, it was announced that Dave Bautista would be joining the series for season 2, playing the brother of Baba Voss. In February 2020, news followed that Adrian Paul would also be joining the cast, playing a character named Lord Harlan, though Tom Mison would end up taking that role. In October 2020, it was announced that Jason Momoa's former Stargate Atlantis castmate, Joe Flanigan, had been cast in the second season of the show in a recurring role. In June 2021, it was announced Eden Epstein, Tom Mison, Hoon Lee and Olivia Cheng had joined Bautista as new series regulars for the second season whilst David Hewlett and Tamara Tunie would guest star.

In June 2022, it was announced that David Hewlett, who guest starred in the second season, was promoted to series regular for the third and final season and was joined by new series regular Michael Raymond-James whilst Trieste Kelly Dunn would guest star.

=== Filming ===
Principal and major photography for the first season commenced on September 17, 2018, in Vancouver, British Columbia, Canada and ended on February 8, 2019. In October 2018, filming was reported to be taking place in Coquitlam, Eagle Mountain, North Vancouver (water shed), Rutheford service road, Pemberton, Deroche, Delta at Boundary Bay, Mission, Squamish Valley, Youth Detention Center Burnaby, Allouette in Mapleridge and the Campbell River and Strathcona Provincial Park areas of Vancouver Island, British Columbia. Production costs for See rivaled that of HBO's Game of Thrones, though rumors that the budget for the first two seasons was $240 million, or $15 million per episode, were debunked by Lawrence.

Filming for the second season was expected to begin on February 3, 2020, and end on July 10, 2020. However, in March 2020, production was shut down due to the COVID-19 pandemic. In September 2020, it was reported that See would resume filming on October 14, 2020, in Toronto. The second season finished filming on March 18, 2021.

Prior to the premiere of season two, the show was renewed for a third season with filming beginning in May and wrapping in November 2021.

== Release ==
During Apple WWDC 2021, a sizzle reel included footage from the second season. A few days later, on June 10, 2021, a teaser for the second season was revealed along with the release of August 27, 2021.

=== Home media ===
Seasons 1 and 2 received Region 2 DVD and Blu-ray releases in late 2022. The complete series was released on Region 1 DVD and Blu-ray in July 2025.

== Reception ==
=== Critical response ===
The review aggregation website Rotten Tomatoes gave the first season a 44% approval rating based on 52 reviews, with an average rating of 5.30/10. The website's critical consensus reads, "Though its capable cast is clearly game, an over-reliance on gore and a grimly—and at times comically—convoluted narrative blurs See's bold vision." On Metacritic the series has a weighted average score of 40 out of 100 based on reviews from 25 critics, indicating "generally unfavorable reviews".

In November 2019, Variety's Daniel D'Addario was critical of the show, saying it: "Wastes the time of Jason Momoa and Alfre Woodard, among others, on a story that starts from a position of fun, giddy strangeness and drags itself forward at a lugubrious pace."

Ben Travers at IndieWire responded positively to the first season: "Steven Knight's action-drama is a strange-but-effective blend" and "the balance isn't quite there yet, as episodes don't exactly earn their hourlong run time. Momoa, meanwhile, fits the role well."

Rotten Tomatoes gave the second season an 83% approval rating based on 6 reviews, with an average rating of 7.10/10. Season 2 broke the viewership record for Apple TV, becoming the channel's most-watched drama series.

Collider, in reviewing the final season, wrote, "Season 3, which also serves as the conclusion of the show, continues this positive trajectory, arriving at an ending that offers plenty of well-staged action that also delves deeper into the characters nearing the end of their story."

=== Accolades ===
Year	Award	Category	Recipient(s)	Result	Ref.
2019	IGN's Best of 2019 Awards	Best Action TV Series	See	Nominated	
2020	The CAFTCAD Awards	Excellence in Crafts – Textiles	Lanny Campbell, Ellie Schultz, Samantha Stroman, Carolyn Bentley, Ciara Brady, & Gaye Gardiner	Won	
2020	The CAFTCAD Awards	Excellence in Crafts, Western Canada – Building	Kieu Nguyen, Tannis Hegan, Ying Quan, Roma Wnuk, Renee Hope Twaddle	Won	
2020	Directors Guild of Canada	Outstanding Directorial Achievement in Dramatic Series	Stephen Surjik (for "Silk")	Nominated	
2020	The Joey Awards	Best Actress in a Guest Role on a TV Series 11–16 years	Ava Sleeth	Won	
2020	Leo Awards	Best Make-Up in a Dramatic Series	Toby Lindala, Bree-Anna Lehto, Connie Parker, Matthew Aebig, Lanny C. Brown	Nominated	
2020	Location Managers Guild International Awards	Outstanding Locations in Period Television	Trevor Brokop, Nick Bergstedt, Michael Gazetas	Nominated	
2020	Ruderman Family Foundation Seal of Authentic Representation	Authentic Representation	See	Won	
2020	SXSW Film Festival	Excellence in Title Design	Karin Fong	Won	
2020	UBCP/ACTRA Awards	Best Supporting Performance, Female	Kyra Zagorsky (for "Silk")	Nominated	
2020	Visual Effects Society Awards	Outstanding Supporting Visual Effects in a Photoreal Episode	Adrian de Wet, Eve Fizzinoglia, Matthew Welford, Pedro Sabrosa, Tom Blacklock (for "Godflame")	Nominated	
2022	Visual Effects Society Awards	Outstanding Supporting Visual Effects in a Photoreal Episode	Chris Wright, Parker Chehak, Javier Roca, Tristan Zerafa, Tony Kenny (for "Rock-A-Bye")	Won	
2023	Visual Effects Society Awards	Outstanding Supporting Visual Effects in a Photoreal Episode	Chris Wright, Parker Chehak, Tristan Zerafa, Oscar Perea, Tony Kenny (for "I See You")	Nominated	
