= Kelley Kali =

American director, actor, writer, and producer

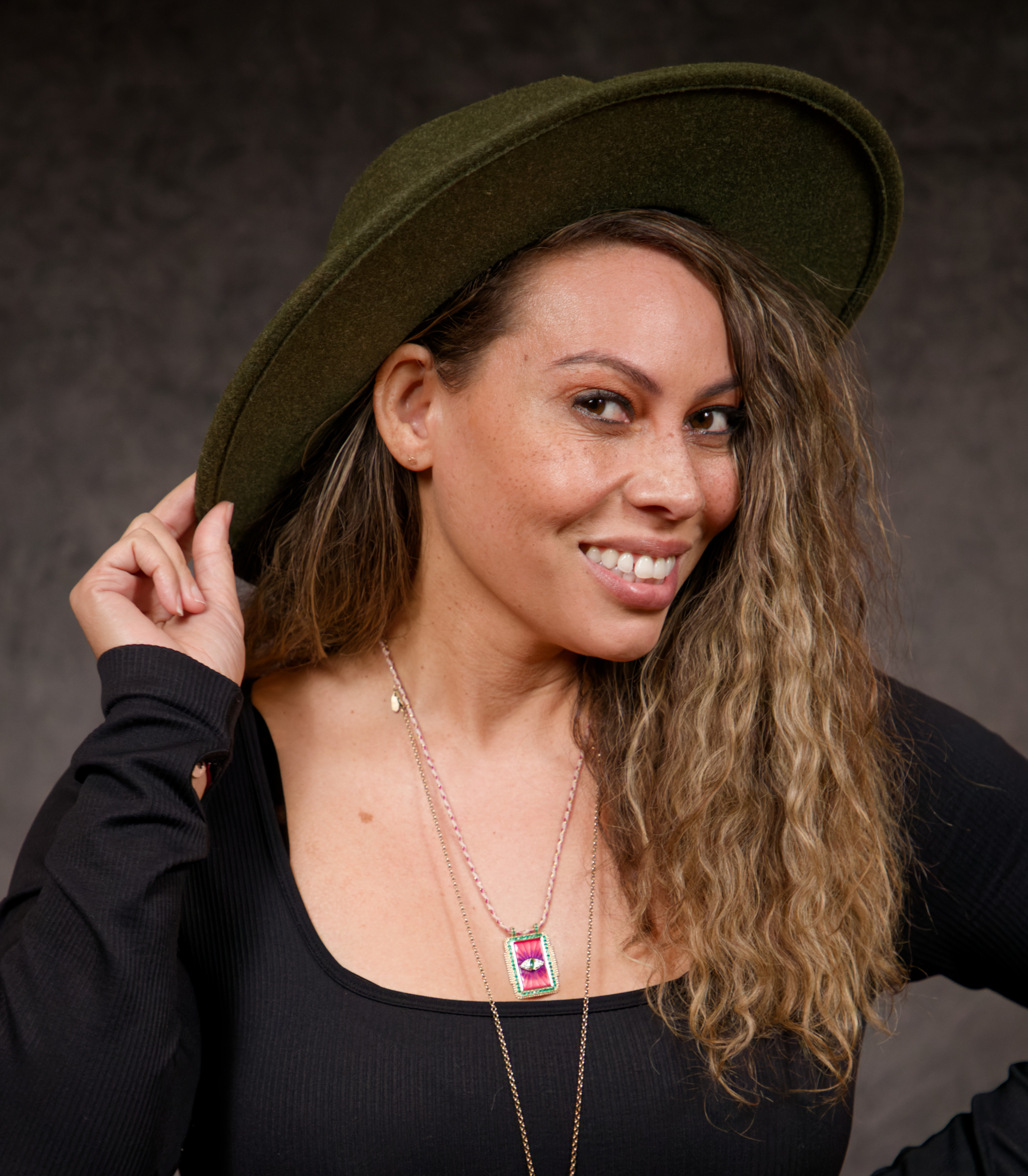
- Kali in 2025
- Born: Kelley Kali Chatman; Northridge, California, U.S.
- Education: Howard University; USC School of Cinematic Arts
- Occupations: Director, actor, writer, and producer
- Known for: I'M FINE (Thanks for Asking)

Kelley Kali is an American director, actor, writer, and producer. She is the creator of the 2021 indie film I'm Fine (Thanks for Asking), which has won several awards in the film festival circuit. Other directing credits include Lalo's House (2018), Kemba (2022), and Jagged Mind (2023).

== Early life and education ==
Kali was born Kelley Kali Chatman, in Northridge, California.

She got her bachelor's degree in anthropology, with majors in archeology and minors in film and classical civilization from Howard University. As a student there, Kali directed on multiple episodes for the Belize dramatic television series Noh Matta Wat!

She attended the USC School of Cinematic Arts in TV and Film Production program, graduating with a Master of Fine Arts in 2018. She released the short film Lalo's House (2018), a drama concerning child sex trafficking in Haiti. According to Kali, the film was nine years in the making and had been part of her application project as well as her thesis project for University of Southern California (USC). The film won the Programmers Award at the Pan African Film Festival.

Kali was professionally trained in acting at Ivana Chubbuck Studios and received training in directing from the University of California. Whilst a student, she was the President of the USC School of Cinematic Arts Graduate Council, and represented the school at USC Graduate Student Government events within the USC.

== Career ==
In 2020, Kali directed, wrote, produced, and starred in the feature film, I'm Fine (Thanks for Asking), which was released in 2021. She was also selected to work with Ron Howard and Brian Grazer's company New Form to develop her web series, The Discovery of Dit Dodson.

In 2022, she directed the film Kemba, which was produced by MPI, and premiered at the Fort Lauderdale International Film Festival in 2023.

In 2023, she directed and produced the film Jagged Mind starring Maisie Richardson-Sellers. The film premiered at the American Black Film Festival, Miami in June 2023.

== Awards ==
- 2021 Academy Gold Fellowship
- SXSW Special Jury Recognition for Multi-Hyphenate Storyteller to Kelley Kali
- 45th Annual Student Academy Award (2018)
- Directors Guild of America Student Filmmaker Award 2018
- KCET Fine Cut Award (2019)
- Shadow and Act's "Rising Award" (2019)
- Diversity in Cannes Showcase, sponsored by Viola Davis and Julius Tennon's JuVee Productions - Jury Award and Audience Award (2019)
- Florida Film Festival - Special Jury Award for Persistence of Vision to Kelley Kali (2021)
- Paul Robeson Award – Noh Matta Wat!
- Best Short Film at Calcutta International Cult Films Festival – Lola's House
- Carthage Film Festival Award – Lola's House
- The Programmers' Award at the Oscar-qualifying Pan African Film Festival 2018
