= Kemba (film) =

Biographical film by Kelley Kali

- Directed by: Kelley Kali
- Written by: Christine Swanson
- Produced by: Rob Pfaltzgraff; Stacey Parks; Lana Link
- Starring: Nesta Cooper; Sean Patrick Thomas; Michelle Hurd
- Cinematography: Rasa Partin
- Edited by: Kristina Kromer
- Music by: Stanley A. Smith
- Production companies: BET Films; Moving Picture Institute
- Distributed by: BET+
- Release date: February 22, 2024
- Running time: 107 minutes
- Country: United States
- Language: English

Kemba is a 2024 American biographical legal drama film written by Christine Swanson and directed by Kelley Kali. The film stars Nesta Cooper, Sean Patrick Thomas and Michelle Hurd. The film based on the true story of Kemba Smith, a college student charged as a co-conspirator to her college boyfriend's drug-trafficking crimes and in 1994 was sentenced to 24.5 years in federal prison. Her case drew national attention and support from various organizations including the NAACP Legal Defense and Educational Fund which ultimately prompted President Bill Clinton to grant her executive clemency after serving 6.5 years. She later became a criminal justice advocate and public speaker. Smith herself served as executive producer of the film.

Kemba premiered at the Pan African Film Festival on February 15, 2024. The film was released by BET+ on February 22, 2024.

== Cast ==
- Nesta Cooper as Kemba Smith
- Sean Patrick Thomas as Gus Smith
- Michelle Hurd as Odessa Smith
- Cameron Dye as President Bill Clinton
- Kelsey Scott as Michelle
- Siddiq Saunderson as Khalif
- Stephen Ruffin as Jamal
- Ron Clinton Smith as Federal Marshall Smith
- Andrea Laing as Newscaster
- June Carryl as Elaine Jones
- Ethan McDowell as Matthew
- Pat Dortch as George Kendall

== Reception ==
Film critic Josh Bell from Crooked Marquee gave the film a grade "C", writing:

Prison reform activist Kemba Smith is the kind of person whose life story gets adapted into prime Oscar bait, and this BET original production doesn’t have the resources to do her justice.

Amari Allah from Wherever I Look gave the film a mixed review, writing:

I feel very torn about Kemba. On the one hand, it highlights a modern victory for the Legal Defense Fund and why the NAACP still matters beyond a talking head commenting on the latest news headline. But at the same time, it overstays its welcome, doesn't really have moving performances, and it overall feels like a story that deserves to be told, just better than this.
