= Black Cloud (Burning Man installation) =

Ukrainian inflatable art installation shown at Burning Man 2025

Black Cloud was a large-scale interactive art installation created by Ukrainian artist Oleksiy Sai. The monumental inflatable sculpture debuted in Kyiv in June 2025 and was subsequently installed at Burning Man 2025, where it was destroyed by a dust storm within hours of its deployment. After the destruction of Black Cloud, its creators repurposed salvaged materials to produce No Fate, a successor installation presented at Burning Man.

== Description ==
Black Cloud was an inflatable thundercloud sculpture composed of 45 interconnected inflatable forms constructed from black Oxford fabric. The structure stood 15 meters tall, approximately 17 meters wide, and 30 meters in length. The installation weighed approximately 8 tons and required 88,000 cubic feet of air for inflation.

It incorporated multimedia elements including twenty strobe lights within the structure that created lightning effects and a continuous soundscape composed of field recordings of warfare in Ukraine, including sirens, missile strikes, explosions, and artillery fire. The audio was created by Ukrainian drum and bass producer Involver and incorporated acoustic recordings by Denys Vasyliev, a musician from Zaporizhzhia whose recordings documented explosions and shelling in that city. The sculptural form was stylized as a child's drawing of a thundercloud.

== Concept and themes ==
Black Cloud, also titled "Get Ready", functioned as a metaphor for global threats and the inevitability of large-scale conflict. The installation presented the lived experience of warfare to audiences through combined visual and sonic elements. According to Vitaliy Deynega, general producer and founder of Ukrainian Witness, the work addressed the risks of future conflict extending beyond Ukraine, with messaging directed toward Western audiences suggesting preparedness for potential large-scale threats. It aimed to make abstract concepts of conflict tangible and emotionally resonant to viewers.

== Exhibition history ==
=== Kyiv premiere ===
Black Cloud was first unveiled on June 7, 2025, in Kyiv's Sophia Square (Sofiivska Square). The installation was accompanied by a multimedia presentation created by Ukrainian drum and bass artist Involver.

=== Burning Man 2025 ===
The installation was transported to Burning Man 2025 in Nevada's Black Rock Desert, debuting on August 24, 2025—Ukraine's Independence Day and the opening day of the festival. The installation was assembled overnight with assistance from hundreds of volunteers. Black Cloud represented the third consecutive year of Ukrainian art installations at Burning Man, following Sorry in 2023 and I'm Fine in 2024.

== Destruction and aftermath ==
Within hours of its installation, Black Cloud was destroyed by a severe dust storm at Burning Man on August 24, 2025. The storm, characterized by winds exceeding 50 miles per hour, dismantled the structure in less than fifteen minutes despite the installation's design to withstand extreme weather conditions. According to Deynega, "It held against the wind for the first fifteen minutes, and then tore apart in the middle—the storm burst inside and destroyed it completely." The dust storm was described as the strongest weather event in Burning Man's history and resulted in damage to multiple installations at the festival.

Despite the destruction of Black Cloud, the artistic team created a successor installation titled No Fate from the remnants of the original work. This new piece, assembled in three days using salvaged black Oxford fabric, presented at Burning Man and incorporated a poem by Ukrainian poet Mykola Khvylovy recited by actor and director Akhtem Seitablaiev with accompaniment from DJ Tapolsky and electronic artist Involver using actual war sound recordings from Zaporizhzhia.

The destruction of Black Cloud was recognized by the creative team as symbolically resonant with the installation's conceptual messaging. In a statement released following the disaster, the Black Cloud team wrote: "Perhaps this storm has taken the threat with it. A quiet hope on Ukraine's Independence Day … drifting away on the desert winds."

The installation team confirmed plans to rebuild Black Cloud for a European tour, though specific dates and locations had not been announced as of late August 2025.

== Production and support ==
The Black Cloud installation was produced under the direction of Vitaliy Deynega, founder of Ukrainian Witness media project and the Come Back Alive foundation, with executive producer Mariia Moroz and artist Oleksiy Sai. The nonprofit organization Nova Ukraine supported the participation of the Ukrainian team at Burning Man 2025. Nova Ukraine had previously supported Ukrainian art installations at Burning Man, including Sorry by Oleksiy Sai (2018) and Catharsis (2019).

== Related works ==
Artist Oleksiy Sai and producer Vitaliy Deynega have created multiple installations at Burning Man addressing Ukrainian themes. In 2024, the team presented I'm Fine, a sculpture exceeding 2,000 pounds constructed from street signs damaged by bullets and shrapnel collected from across Ukraine.
