= Reality High =

2017 film by Fernando Lebrija

- Official poster
- Directed by: Fernando Lebrija
- Written by: Brandon Broussard; Hudson Obayuwana; Jana Savage
- Produced by: Jane Fleming; Mark Ordesky
- Starring: Nesta Cooper; Keith Powers
- Cinematography: Pietro Zuercher
- Edited by: Radu Ion; Amy McGrath
- Music by: Ruwanga Samath
- Distributed by: Netflix
- Release date: September 8, 2017 (United States)
- Running time: 99 minutes
- Country: United States
- Language: English

#RealityHigh (stylized as #REALITYHIGH) is a 2017 American teen comedy directed by Fernando Lebrija. It was released on Netflix on September 8, 2017.

== Plot ==
Dani Barnes an excellent high-school student who receives straight As and is focused on getting a scholarship to U.C. Davis. Highly passionate about dogs, she volunteers at the local dog clinic.

Considered an unfashionable nerd, Dani is not very popular at her school. Her only friend is her best friend, Freddie Myers, who develops a secret crush on her, but Dani does not seem to register Freddie's feelings for her.

Dani only has eyes for Cameron Drake, whom she has had a crush on since childhood. Unlike Dani, Cameron is one of the most popular guys at her school, and unfortunately for her, also Alexa Medina's boyfriend. Alexa, Dani's “bully“ and former childhood best friend, portrays exactly the opposite of her: She is idolized by the entire school and has numerous followers on various social-media platforms.

Alexa breaks up with her boyfriend, Cameron, to go out with another social media champion named Fousey. This results in Dani and Cameron getting closer. After getting dumped, Alexa suddenly shows great interest in befriending Dani again. She offers Dani a fresh start and apologizes for treating her badly.

Alexa integrates her into her friend group, thus drawing her into a completely new Southern California scene, consisting of excessively high-cost shopping and partying. Dani begins to enjoy the popularity she gains, and the attention Alexa brings her, which eventually leads to Dani losing herself within this new, superficial lifestyle to which she has adjusted by looking hot and dressing like Alexa.

Dani's improved social status causes her to lose sight of more significant things, such as sincere, honest friendship. While she'd been hanging with Alexa, she let down Freddie by blowing off his first paid gig, the animal rescue, by losing their venue, and by not supporting Cameron at his meet, his big TV appearance and by keeping quiet over his UCLA acceptance in front of his dad.

Cameron breaks up with Dani, and then Alexa, as she cannot be trusted, posts a video calling her a stalker and a drunk using video 'evidence'. It goes viral on Instagram, and memes are created to bully her. Her little sister shows her support by quitting following Alexa.

Dani makes up with Freddie, then gets the fast-food restaurant Bob's Big Boy to host the animal rescue event. It's a success, so Fiona gives her the promised college recommendation. That evening is the senior class beach bonfire. Here, everyone comes together, except Alexa, who's mourning the loss of her YouTube channel, and Cameron and Dani kiss and make up.

== Cast ==
- Nesta Cooper as Dani Barnes
- Keith Powers as Cameron Drake
- Alicia Sanz as Alexa Medina
- Jake Borelli as Freddie Myers
- Anne Winters as Holly
- Patrick Davis as Miguel
- Michael Provost as Shannon
- Ryan Malaty as Vinny
- Kate Walsh as Dr. Fiona Shively
- John Michael Higgins as Principal Dixon
- Alejandro Edda as Big Jim
- Valarie Rae Miller as Mrs. Barnes
- Jeffrey D. Sams as Mr. Barnes
- Leah Rose Randall as Taylor Barnes
- Suzanne Altfeld as Freddie's Grandmother
- Chris Broussard as Jackson Blade

== Reception ==
The film has garnered mostly negative reviews, with a 40% rating on Rotten Tomatoes and one star from Common Sense Media.
