= Nesta Cooper =

Canadian actress (b. 1999)

- Born: Nesta Marlee Cooper; Mississauga, Ontario, Canada
- Occupation: Actress
- Years active: 2013–present
- Spouse: Peter Van Auker

Nesta Cooper is a Canadian actress best known for her roles of Dani Barnes in Reality High and Shannon in The Edge of Seventeen. From 2016 to 2018, Cooper had a main role as Carly Shannon in the series Travelers. From 2019 to 2022, she played the main role of Haniwa on the Apple TV+ original program, See.

== Early life and education ==
At the age of seven, Cooper moved to Courtenay, British Columbia, with her parents. She pursued a career in the arts whenever the opportunity presented itself. After she completed high school, she moved to Vancouver for more film opportunities.

== Career ==
Cooper's first television role was in 2013, appearing in two episodes of the series Cult. Her first film role was in the 2015 movie Diablo.

In early 2015, Cooper started working as a production assistant on a short film showcasing Truvelle's eight-piece 2015 bridal collection. On May 12, 2015, the film was released on Vimeo.

Cooper played Carly Shannon (Traveler 3465) on the science fiction series Travelers (2016–2018), about special operatives tasked with preventing the collapse of society. These operatives, known as "travelers", have their consciousnesses sent back in time and transferred into the "host" body of present-day individuals who are about to die, minimizing unexpected impact on the future. As Carly, the team's tactician, she assumes the life of a stay-at-home single mother.

Cooper played a main character in Apple TV+'s See (2019–2022), about a post-apocalyptic world where most of humanity is blind. As Haniwa, Cooper played one of two sighted children of Baba Voss and Maghra (her character is the biological daughter of Jerlmarel, who was also sighted). Proud, determined, and strong, Haniwa grows to be more rebellious than her twin brother Kofun, and more curious about the children's true origins.

== Personal life ==
Cooper began dating Peter Van Auker, an associate producer on Reality High, after the film had wrapped on November 21, 2016.

== Filmography ==
=== Film ===
Year	Title	Role	Notes
2015	Diablo	Rebecca Carver	
2016	The Edge of Seventeen	Shannon	
2017	Barbie Video Game Hero	Gaia	Voice only
2017	Curious Females	Nikki	Short
2017	Reality High	Dani Barnes	
2018	The Miracle Season	Lizzie Ackerman	
2021	Bliss	Emily Wittle	
2024	Kemba	Kemba Smith	

=== Television ===
Year	Title	Role	Notes
2013	Cult	Young Sakelik	2 episodes
2013	The Haunting Hour: The Series	Lizzie	Episode: "Dead Bodies"
2014–2015	Girlfriends' Guide to Divorce	Teacher	2 episodes
2015	Supernatural	Bartender	Episode: "There's No Place Like Home"
2015	So You Said Yes	Young Bride	TV movie
2015	The Returned	Megan	2 episodes
2015	Heroes Reborn: Dark Matters	Dahlia	2 episodes
2015	Unreal	Assistant Molly	2 episodes
2015	Ties That Bind	Liz	Episode: "It Doesn't Show"
2015–2016	Heroes Reborn	Dahlia	4 episodes
2016	The Magicians	Gretchen	Episode: "The Strangled Heart"
2016	Motive	Stacey Edmonds	Episode: "The Scorpion and the Frog"
2016	The 100	Shay	Episode: "Red Sky at Morning"
2016–2018	Travelers	Carly Shannon	Main role
2017	S.W.A.T.	Desiree Watson	Episode: "Imposters"
2018	Spy Kids: Mission Critical	Claudia "Scorpion" Floop	Main role
2018	Supergirl	Tanya	2 episodes
2019	Where's Waldo	Anesu	Episode: "Victoria Falls & Winters"
2019–2022	See	Haniwa	Main role
2025	Dope Thief	Michelle Taylor	8 episodes
2025–present	Fire Country	Violet	Season 3 & 4, 6 episodes
