= Jagged Mind =

2023 film by Kelley Kali

- Official poster
- Directed by: Kelley Kali
- Written by: Allyson Morgan
- Based on: First Date by Allyson Morgan
- Produced by: Daniela Ruiz; Kelley Kali; Congyu E
- Starring: Maisie Richardson-Sellers; Shannon Woodward
- Cinematography: Rasa Partin
- Edited by: Salvador Pérez García
- Music by: Jongnic Bontemps
- Production companies: 20th Digital Studio; Palabra Productions
- Distributed by: Hulu (United States); Disney+ (international)
- Release dates: June 14, 2023 (American Black Film Festival); June 15, 2023 (United States)
- Running time: 88 minutes
- Country: United States
- Language: English

Jagged Mind is a 2023 American psychological horror thriller film directed by Kelley Kali and written by Allyson Morgan, based on her 2020 short film First Date. It stars Maisie Richardson-Sellers and Shannon Woodward.

The film premiered at the American Black Film Festival on June 14, 2023, and was released in the United States on Hulu the following day. It was released internationally on Disney+ via the Star content hub.

== Plot ==
After Billie begins dating a mysterious woman named Alex, she suddenly becomes plagued by blackouts and strange visions that lead her to discover she's stuck in a series of time loops.

Alex is in possession of a time crystal that can turn back time. Alex sometimes loses her temper, manipulates Billie and, thanks to the crystal, makes her forget her outbursts. One day, Alex murders her ex-girlfriend Rose, an artist. Billie keeps Rose's self-portrait in a bowl carved by Papa Juste, the contents of which are spared from the effects of the time crystal. She also keeps a USB stick containing a video there, to remind herself of the time crystal. During a dinner together, a showdown ensues in which Billie snatches the time crystal from Alex and turns back time to their first meeting. She then declines Alex’s invitation for a drink; the next day, she goes to Rose’s exhibition.

== Cast ==
- Maisie Richardson-Sellers as Billie
- Shannon Woodward as Alex
- Rosaline Elbay as Christine
- Shein Mompremier as Rose
- Kate Szekely as Kim
- Jimmy Jean-Louis as Papa Juste
- Casey Ford Alexander as Dr. Ortiz

== Production ==
Jagged Mind is based on writer Allyson Morgan's short film First Date, that aired on season one of the Hulu series Bite Size Halloween (2020). Produced by 20th Digital Studio and Palabra Productions as a Hulu original film, it is directed by Kelley Kali from a screenplay by Morgan. Maisie Richardson-Sellers and Shannon Woodward portray new girlfriends, Billie and Alex, respectively. Filming took place in the Little Haiti neighborhood of Miami. Jongnic Bontemps composed the film's score.

== Release ==
Jagged Mind premiered at the American Black Film Festival on June 14, 2023. It was released in the United States on Hulu the following day and was released on Disney+ (via Star) internationally.

== Reception ==
On the review aggregator website Rotten Tomatoes, 67% of 15 critics' reviews are positive, with an average rating of 5.5/10.

The Los Angeles Times's Noel Murray asserted "Even without its paranormal elements, Jagged Mind is a powerful portrait of the dissociation that occurs when a person tries to justify the misbehavior of someone they love." Kayla Kumari Upadhyaya of Autostraddle said, "While imperfect in some of its plotting, Jagged Mind is delicious in its thematic underpinnings, execution of horror (with evocative editing and directing on this front), and performances. Richardson-Sellers and Woodward (both queer IRL btw) are electric scene partners, and Woodward makes an extremely compelling villain. The script could have easily tilted into Lifetime original movie territory if not for the direction and these performances."

Paul Lê from Bloody Disgusting gave the film a rating of three out of five, saying, "[the] film is often compelling and tense, the two leads deliver strong and vulnerable performances, and the outcome is rewarding. Supporters of queer filmmaking will be enthused to see not only a new genre story where the central conflict has nothing to do with sexuality issues, and the characters are layered and imperfect." Randy Myers writing for The Mercury News gave the film a score of one and half out of five, saying "An under-realized screenplay fails all involved, particularly lead Maisie Richardson Sellers. She gives it her all as Billie, a queer woman with a rotten streak with women. She also blacks out and finds herself stuck in a Groundhog Day-like loop. Therein lies the plot problem, Jagged Mind repeats its scenes too often, making it feel like this originated as a short film that got stretched into a feature."
