= Ruwanga Samath =

American record producer and songwriter

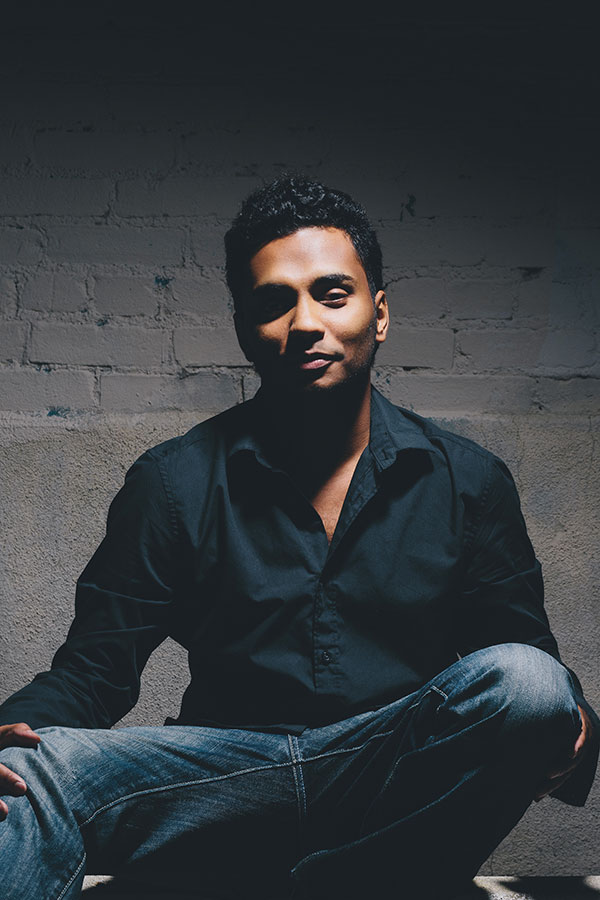

Background information
- Born: Ruwanga Samath
- Genres: Hip hop, pop, R&B, dancehall
- Occupations: Record producer, composer, songwriter, musician
- Instruments: Keyboards, synthesizer, drum machine
- Years active: 2001–present
- Label: Smooth Blaq
- Website: http://www.smoothblaq.com

Ruwanga Nirashad Samath is an American record producer and songwriter born in Sri Lanka. He is best known for his music in blockbuster movies such as Fast Five and Ted.

== Early life ==
Ruwanga was born in Sri Lanka, into a musically influenced environment. Through his mother, Renuka, who is a musician, he was surrounded by some of the best musicians in the country. At the height of the country's unstable political atmosphere and civil war, his family decided to move to Pasadena, CA when he was 12. He attended John Muir High School before moving to La Verne, California, and graduating from Bonita High School. After high school, he attended Cal State San Bernardino for a semester until he dropped out to pursue a career in music.

== Career ==
=== Music in Film ===
Ruwanga has either composed and produced music for over 50 movies including the end title songs for movies such as Fast Five (Universal Pictures) Busta Rhymes, Don Omar and J. Doe titled "How we Roll, Morgan Spurlock's The Greatest Movie Ever Sold (Sony Pictures) "CameraBuggin" features Big Boi from the legendary Outkast, as well as Matt & Kim, Reality High (Netflix) &Gideon's Army (HBO). He has also placed songs in movies such as TED (Universal Pictures), Spare Parts (Lionsgate), Tower Heist (Universal Pictures), You're Next (Lionsgate), Generation Iron, Saw IV (Lionsgate), Christmas in Compton, Son of Morning^{,} Doubletime & Wonder(Lionsgate).

=== TV shows ===
Ruwanga has written and produced theme songs for several television programs, including History Channel's Mounted in Alaska, TLC's Unleashed : K9, Lifetime's Preacher's Daughters Seasons 1 & 2, Playboy's King of Clubs & Hulu's Mother Up! His songs were also featuring in MTV's Jersey Shore and Battle Ground Earth : Ludacris vs Tommy Lee

=== Composer ===
Ruwanga has composed several movies, including Netflix Original #RealityHigh, STARZ original Flock of Dudes & National Lampoon's" Another Dirty Movie". He has also composed several documentaries such as "Cosplay Universe", "Long Live Rock... Celebrate the Chaos'', "How I Got Over" and the upcoming Muhumad Ali documentary titled "City of Ali''.

=== Mixtapes/ Remixes ===
In 2013, Ruwanga released his first mixtape through Roc Nation/ Three Six Zero titled #Backin20

Ruwanga has done several remixes for artists such as including Beyoncé Knowles' "Ring the Alarm" remix, Britney Spears' "Break the Ice" remix, Kelly Rowland's "Work" remix, The Virgins' "Rich Girls" remix.

=== Collaborations ===
Ruwanga has worked with and collaborated with artists such as Busta Rhymes, Rachel Crow, Meghan Trainor, Ke$ha, Mistah F.A.B., Clyde Carson, Don Omar, SOB X RBE & Leven Kali. Ruwanga founded the record label/ multimedia company, Smooth Blaq in 2017. Smooth Blaq artists include Tyler Sellers.
