= I'm Fine (Burning Man installation) =

Burning Man art installation

- I'm Fine displayed at Burning Man
- Artist: Oleksiy Sai
- Year: 2024
- Medium: Sculpture
- Dimensions: 7 m × 32 m (23 ft × 105 ft)
- Weight: 19 tons

I'm Fine is a 2024 art installation created by Ukrainian artists Oleksiy Sai and Vitaliy Deynega. Displayed at the Burning Man festival in Nevada, United States, the sculpture measures 105 feet (32 m) in length and 23 feet (7.0 m) in height. It was constructed from war-damaged materials collected from territories invaded in Ukraine during the 2022 Russo-Ukrainian war, such as bullet-riddled street signs, destroyed fences, and damaged satellite dishes.

== Background ==
The installation was created as a collaboration between Oleksiy Sai, Ukrainian media project Ukrainian Witness and its founder Vitaliy Deynega, with a DJ set performed by DJ Anatoly Tapolsky. The work was developed to communicate the reality of the ongoing war in Ukraine to an international audience. The installation's title was inspired by the This Is Fine internet meme, which featured a dog calmly sitting in the middle of a burning room, representing being composed and resilient in a tragedy.

== Description and exhibition ==
I'm Fine was displayed at Burning Man 2024, which took place from August 25 to September 2, 2024, in Nevada's Black Rock Desert within the temporary city of Black Rock City. The festival's theme that year was "Curiouser & Curiouser," inspired by Lewis Carroll's Alice's Adventures in Wonderland. The sculpture was assembled on-site by a team of 25 volunteers, many of whom were military personnel on temporary leave from the 2022 Russo-Ukrainian war in order to participate in installing it.

The installation spells out the phrase "I'm Fine" along with a smiley face emoticon. The installation uses war debris collected from various areas of Ukraine that were invaded, such as street signs, solar panels, satellite dishes, city signs, and fencing, all with damage from bullets and shrapnel. The sculpture measures 105 feet (32 m) in length, 23 feet (7.0 m) in height, and weighs approximately 19 tons.

Along with the installation, Tapolsky performed a DJ set in front of the sculpture on August 28th. The performance used recordings of Ukrainian people's voices answering the question "How are you?".

== Reception and cultural significance ==
The installation attracted significant attention from people attending the event and international media. Attendees noted the emotional impact of the work, with many visitors reportedly crying when seeing the damaged materials. Deynega described the public's reaction, stating that visitors would "stand and look. Sometimes for a long time. The braver ones touch the sharp edges. Many cry."

The installation symbolized the destruction in Ukraine caused by the 2022 Russo-Ukrainian war and the Ukrainian peoples' resiliency. Among the materials used in the installation were 12 pedestrian crossing signs. Deynega stated that the signs "represents people killed by Russians at the beginning of the war simply for crossing the road or riding a bicycle on errands." The title "I'm Fine" serves as an ironic statement, representing the war's "normalcy" and how the Ukrainian people experience it on a daily basis.

== See also ==
- Ukrainian art
- War art
- Black Cloud (Burning Man installation)
