= List of Ecuadorian films =

A list of films produced in Ecuador in year order.

== 1920s ==
| Title | Director | Cast | Genre | Notes |
|---|---|---|---|---|
1920
1921
1922
1923
1924
| El Tesoro de Atahualpa | | | | |
1925
1926
1927
1928
1929

== 1930s ==
| Title | Director | Cast | Genre | Notes |
|---|---|---|---|---|
1930
1931
1932
1933
1934
1935
1936
1937
1938
1939

== 1940s ==
| Title | Director | Cast | Genre | Notes |
|---|---|---|---|---|
1940
1941
1942
1943
1944
1945
| A río revuelto | | | | |
1946
1947
1948
1949
| They Met in Guayaquil | Paco Villar | Antonio Arboleda, Anita Burgos | Drama | The first sound film made in Ecuador |

== 1950s ==
| Title | Director | Cast | Genre | Notes |
|---|---|---|---|---|
1950
| Dawn in Pichincha | Alberto Santana | Paul Feret, Martha Jácome, Salomón Rosero | Drama | |
1951
1952
1953
1954
1955
1956
1957
1958
1959

== 1960s ==
| Title | Director | Cast | Genre | Notes |
|---|---|---|---|---|
1960
1961
1962
1963
1964
1965
1966
| Fiebre de juventud | Alfonso Corona Blake | Enrique Guzmán, Begoña Palacios, Rosa María Vázquez, Fernando Luján | Musical comedy | |
1967
| A la sombra del sol | | | | |
1968
| Annabelle Lee | | | | |
1969

== 1970s ==
| Title | Director | Cast | Genre | Notes |
|---|---|---|---|---|
1970
1971
1972
1973
1974
| Allpakallpa | | | | |
1975
1976
1977
1978
1979

== 1980s ==
| Title | Director | Cast | Genre | Notes |
|---|---|---|---|---|
1980
1981
| Dos para el camino | | | | |
1982
1983
1984
1985
1986
1987
1988
1989

== 1990s ==
| Title | Director | Cast | Genre | Notes |
|---|---|---|---|---|
1990
1991
| Alias 'La Gringa' | Alberto Durant | | | |
1992
1993
1994
1995
1996
1997
1998
| Dreams from the Middle of the World | Carlos Naranjo Estrella | | | |
1999
| Ratas, Ratones, Rateros | Sebastián Cordero | | | |

== 2000s ==
| Title | Director | Cast | Genre | Notes |
|---|---|---|---|---|
2000
2001
2002
2003
2004
| Crónicas | Sebastián Cordero | John Leguizamo, Leonor Watling, Damián Alcázar, José María Yazpik | | Screened at the 2004 Cannes Film Festival |
2005
2006
| Qué tan lejos | Tania Hermida | | | |
2007
2008
2009
2010
2011
| With My Heart in Yambo | María Fernanda Restrepo | | Documentary | |
| In the Name of the Girl | Tania Hermida | | | |
| Behind You | Tito Jara | | | |
2012
| Mejor no hablar de ciertas cosas | Javier Andrade | | | |
2013
| Silence in Dreamland | Tito Molina | | | |
2014
| Feriado | Diego Araujo | | | |
2015
2016
| Such Is Life in the Tropics | Sebastián Cordero | | | |
| Alba | Ana Cristina Barragán | Macarena Arias | | |
2017
| Virus Tropical | Santiago Caicedo | | | |
2018
| Final Minute | Luis Avilés | | | |
| From Core to Sun | Oliver Garland | | | |
| A Son of Man | Jamaicanoproblem | | | |
2019
| Ventaja | Kristian McKay | | | |
| Dedicated to My Ex | Jorge Ulloa | | | |
| The Longest Night | Gabriela Calvache | | | |
2020
| Sumergible | | | | |
| Emptiness | Paul Venegas | | | |
2021
2022
2023
| Behind the Mist | Sebastián Cordero | | | |
2024
| Affections | Diego Ayala, Aníbal Jofré | | | |
| Chuzalongo | Diego Ortuño | | | |
| The Dog Thief | Vinko Tomičić | | | |
2025
| The Ivy | Ana Cristina Barragán | | | |
