= Cinema of Ecuador =

The cinema of Ecuador has a long history, including both short and feature-length films made throughout the 20th century, but until recently Ecuadorian film has generally not had a large impact.

Cinematic production in Ecuador began in the 1920s, with the production of the first Ecuadorian dramatic feature film, El Tesoro de Atahualpa, directed by the Ecuadorian Augusto San Miguel in 1924. Moreover, in the same decade, the Italian Carlos Crespi directed the major documentary Los Invisibles Shuaras del Alto Amazonas. Between 1930 and 1931, the advent of talkies stopped the development of Ecuadorian film, which tried to cope with the new films using "live sound" ("sonorización en vivo"), that is, the interpretation of texts and songs simultaneously with the projection, though without success. Because of this, for around two decades Ecuadorian cinema revolved around documentaries, news programs, and promotional tourist films, with the exception of dramatic feature films in 1950. However, Ecuadorian cinema was promoted by intellectuals in the 1960s, including Ulises Estrella, director of the Cinemateca Nacional. During this period, Mexican-Ecuadorian co-productions proliferated. During the next decade, the documentary genre was strengthened, and in 1977 the Asociación de Autores Cinematográficos del Ecuador was legalized.

Between the 1980s and the present, Ecuadorian cinema returned to the production of feature films. One example of this trend was the 1989 cinematic adaptation of José de la Cuadra's La Tigra, directed by Camilo Luzuriaga. Luzuriaga also directed Entre Marx y una Mujer Desnuda, a cinematic adaptation of 1809-1810: Mientras llega el día is a film by Jorge Enrique Adoum, which related the story of Quito independence. Other major films in the rebirth of Ecuadorian cinema were Ratas, ratones y rateros (1999) and Crónicas (2004) by director Sebastián Cordero. As of 2008, Cordero was filming his third feature film in Spain, an adaptation of the novel Rabia by the Argentine writer Sergio Bizzio. Also, the film Qué tan lejos by Cuenca's Tania Hermida was highly acclaimed, receiving the Silver Zenith Award Montreal World Film Festival for the best directorial debut. Other productions that have made their way through festivals include the documentary El Comité by Mateo Herrera and Cuando me toque a mí by Víctor Arregui. When Cuando me toque a mí was presented at the Biarritz Festival of Film and Culture of Latin America, the lead actor, Manuel Calisto, won the prize for best actor.

During the 1980s, Ecuador would typically produce one film a year, with this rising to around twelve a year by the mid-2010s.

== See also ==
- Cinemateca Nacional del Ecuador
- List of Ecuadorian films
- List of Ecuadorean submissions for the Academy Award for Best Foreign Language Film
- Cinema of the world
