= List of Ecuadorian submissions for the Academy Award for Best International Feature Film =

Best International Feature Film submissions from Ecuador

Highlights
- Debut: 2000
- Submissions: 14
- Nominations: none
- Oscar winners: none

Ecuador has submitted films for the Academy Award for Best International Feature Film (Note: The category was previously named the Academy Award for Best Foreign Language Film, but this was changed to the Academy Award for Best International Feature Film in April 2019, after the Academy deemed the word "Foreign" to be outdated.) on an irregular basis since 2000. The award is handed out annually by the United States Academy of Motion Picture Arts and Sciences to a feature-length motion picture produced outside the United States that contains primarily non-English dialogue.

As of 2026, Ecuador has submitted fourteen films, but none of them have been nominated.

== Submissions ==
The Academy of Motion Picture Arts and Sciences has invited the film industries of various countries to submit their best film for the Academy Award for Best International Feature Film since 1956. The International Feature Film Committee oversees the process and reviews all the submitted films. Following this, they vote via secret ballot to determine the five nominees for the award.

Most of the films are primary in Spanish, with the exception of Emptiness (2020), which is mainly in Mandarin, but set in Ecuador. Below is a list of the films that have been submitted by Ecuador for review by the Academy for the award by year and the respective Academy Awards ceremony.

Year (Ceremony)	Film title used in nomination	Original title	Language(s)	Director	Result
2000 (73rd)	Dreams from the Middle of the World	Sueños en la mitad del mundo	Spanish	Carlos Naranjo Estrella	Not nominated
2004 (77th)	Chronicles	Crónicas	Spanish, English	Sebastián Cordero	Not nominated
2013 (86th)	Porcelain Horse	Mejor no hablar (de ciertas cosas)	Spanish	Javier Andrade	Not nominated
2014 (87th)	Silence in Dreamland	Silencio en la tierra de los sueños	Spanish	Tito Molina	Not nominated
2016 (89th)	Such Is Life in the Tropics	Sin muertos no hay carnaval	Spanish, English, German	Sebastián Cordero	Not nominated
2017 (90th)	Alba		Spanish	Ana Cristina Barragán	Not nominated
2018 (91st)	A Son of Man	A Son of Man: La maldición del tesoro de Atahualpa	Spanish, English, German, Kichwa	Jamaicanoproblem and Pablo Agüero	Not nominated
2019 (92nd)	The Longest Night	La mala noche	Spanish	Gabriela Calvache	Not nominated
2020 (93rd)	Emptiness	Vacío	Mandarin, Spanish	Paul Venegas	Not nominated
2021 (94th)	Submersible	Sumergible	Spanish	Alfredo León León	Not nominated
2022 (95th)	Lo Invisible		Spanish	Javier Andrade	Not nominated
2024 (97th)	Behind the Mist	Al otro lado de la niebla	Spanish, English, Nepali	Sebastián Cordero	Not nominated
2025 (98th)	Chuzalongo		Spanish, Kichwa	Diego Ortuño	Not nominated
2026 (99th)	The Ivy	Hiedra	Spanish	Ana Cristina Barragán	Pending

== See also ==
- List of Academy Award winners and nominees for Best International Feature Film
- List of Academy Award-winning foreign language films
- Cinema of Ecuador
