= 12th Macondo Awards =

- Date: November 3, 2024
- Site: Santander Theatre; Bucaramanga, Colombia
- Hosted by: Paola Turbay; Santiago Alarcón

Highlights
- Best Film: The Other Son
- Most awards: The Other Son (7)
- Most nominations: The Other Son and El Bolero de Rubén (7)

Television coverage
- Network: TNT, Max, Canal Tro

The 12th Macondo Awards ceremony, presented by the Colombian Academy of Cinematography Arts and Sciences, honored the best audiovisual productions of 2024. It took place on November 3, 2024, at the Santander Theatre in Bucaramanga.

== Winners and nominees ==
Best Picture: The Other Son; La Suprema; Yo vi tres luces negras; El Bolero de Rubén	Best Director: Juan Sebastián Quebrada – The Other Son; Santiago Lozano Álvarez – Yo vi tres luces negras; Catalina Villar – Ana Rosa; Felipe Holguin – La Suprema
Best Actor: Diego Cadavid – El Bolero de Rubén; César Badillo – Memento Mori; Miguel González – The Other Son; Julián Díaz – Itzia, tango y cacao	Best Actress: Jenny Navarrete – The Other Son; Majida Issa – El Bolero de Rubén; Flora Martínez – Itzia, tango y cacao; Silvia Varón – Tiempo presente
Best Supporting Actor: Simón Trujillo – The Other Son; Julián Díaz – Esto se calentó; Juan Sebastián Calero – Simona Amaya, vivir o morir por la libertad; Walter Luengas – Tiempo presente	Best Supporting Actress: Victoria Hernández – Aurora; Aída Morales – El Bolero de Rubén; Juliana Velásquez – El Bolero de Rubén; Sharon Guzman – Somos ecos
Best Screenplay: Juan Sebastián Quebrada – The Other Son; Felipe Holguin, Andres Sierra – La Suprema; Juan Carlos Mazo – El Bolero de Rubén; Theo Montoya – Anhell69	Best Cinematography: Mauricio Vidal – La Suprema; Andrés Felipe Morales – Memento Mori; Manuel Velásquez – Somos ecos, Sábado oscuro
Best Editing: Julie Duclaux – The Other Son; Lina Ortiz – Tiempo presente; Maria Alejandra Briganti – Wërapara; Sebastián Hernández – Nuestra película	Best Art Direction: Sofía Guzmán – Memento Mori; Marcela Gómez, Daniel López – Yo vi tres luces negras; Angélica Perea – 40 días perdidos en la selva; Iván Parra – Itzia, tango y cacao
Best Sound Design: Jaime Cujaban – El Bolero de Rubén; Sebastián Pérez Bastidas – Itzia, tango y cacao; Sebastian Schmidt – Memento Mori; Diego Rodríguez – Esto se calentó	Best Costume Design: Julian Grijalba – Memento Mori; Paula Ciro – Las buenas costumbres; Ana María Acosta – Yo vi tres luces negras; Mabel Amaya – Somos ecos
Best Makeup: Anderson Rodríguez – Memento Mori; Manuela Muñoz – Yo vi tres luces negras; Lili Bonil – Somos ecos; Vivianne Saler – Itzia, tango y cacao	Best Original Score: Andres Cárdenas – Raíces azules; Santiago Lozano – Wërapara; Jose Ricaurte – Al ritmo del agua; Enrico Fabio Cortese – Somos ecos
Best Original Song: Merybella – Somos ecos; Pablo Jaramillo Cavallazzi – Puentes en el mar; Andrés López, Santiago Bohórquez, Antonio Espinosa, Jorge Canal – Tiempo presente; Flora Cheng – Sara: La fuerza del mar	Best Visual Effects: Marcial Quiñones – Yo vi tres luces negras; Javier Chitiva – Esto se calentó; David Andrés Mesa, Daniel Vélez Castro – 40 días perdidos en la selva; Luis Miguel Henao – Tiempo presente
Best Documentary: Yira Paola Plaza – El rojo más puro; Diana Bustamante – Nuestra película; Gabriela Domínguez Ruvalcaba – Raíces azules; Catalina Villar – Ana Rosa	Best Ibero-American Picture: J. A. Bayona – Society of the Snow (Argentina); Sebastián Cordero – Behind the Mist (Ecuador); Felipe Gálvez Haberle – The Settlers (Chile); Carolina Markowicz – Toll (Brazil)
Best Short Film: Esteban Pedraza – Bogotá Story; Víctor Bastidas – Casete rojo; Edgar Alberto De Luque Jácome – El hombre sin cabeza; Jorge Cadena – Flores del otro patio	Best Animated Short Film: Carla Melo – La perra; Andrés Castillo, Diego Castillo – Keradó; Diego Felipe Cortés, Daniela Bello Briceño, Blanca Castellar – Gloria; Angélica Restrepo, Carlos Velandia – Todas mis cicatrices se desvanecen en el viento
Best Documentary Short Film: Santiago Quirama – Hijos del cemento; Manuel Mateo Gómez – Ánima; Gregor Kuhlmann, Fernanda Pineda Palencia – Balanta; Santiago Arbeláez Osorio – The Island	Audience Award – Best Film: El Bolero de Rubén

== See also ==
- List of Colombian films
- Macondo Awards
- 2024 in film
