= Simón Brauer =

Ecuadorian photographer and cinematographer

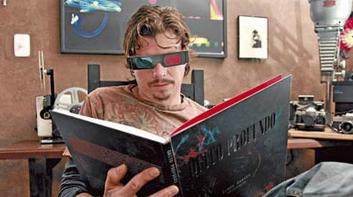
- Simón Brauer, Quito Profundo 2010.
- Born: Simón Brauer Moscoso; June 22, 1973 (age 52); Quito, Ecuador
- Occupations: Photographer and cinematographer
- Years active: 1998–present

Simon Brauer (born June 22, 1973, in Quito, Ecuador) is an Ecuadorian photographer and cinematographer known for his pioneering work in 3D photography and his contributions to Ecuadorian cinema as a director of photography. He has built a career marked by experimentation in both still and moving images, blending artistic photography with narrative filmmaking. He is the author of Quito Profundo (A Profound Quito), recognized as the first Ecuadorian book on 3D photography, with photographs from the project on permanent 3D exhibition at the Church of the Society of Jesus in Quito since 2010.

Brauer co-founded the production company Neurona Digital in 2005 with his wife, photographer Lorena Cordero, and has frequently collaborated with prominent Ecuadorian directors such as Sebastián Cordero, Ana Cristina Barragán, Diego Araujo, Mateo Herrera, and Iván Mora Manzano. His cinematography credits include notable feature films such as A estas alturas de la vida (2013), Cenizas (2018), and Octopus Skin (2022), for which he received a nomination for Best Cinematography at the Platino Awards. He has also earned awards including the Colibrí Award for Best Cinematography for Cenizas and multiple recognitions from the International Photography Awards. In photography, Brauer's projects span portraiture, street photography, and documentary work, including Mantra, Raíz, and Alma Kichwa, which explores Ecuadorian indigenous communities. His exhibitions have appeared in venues such as the Museum of the Portuguese Communications Foundation in Lisbon, and he continues to live and work in Quito with his family.

== Career ==
As a photographer Brauer throughout his career has achieved several awards. From 2007 to date he has been awarded with seven honorable mentions in the "International Photography Awards" one of the most important photography competitions worldwide. His work has been exhibited in several prestigious museums and galleries such as the Museum of the Portuguese Communications Foundation in Lisbon, La Fabrica in Madrid, in the Municipal Museum of Art in Puerto Llano, Spain, among others .His work often focuses on human subjects and experimental techniques.

His publication "Quito Profundo" is the first Ecuadorian book of photography in 3D, so it was constituted as an important reference for the history of photography in Ecuador. The "Quito Profundo" photographs are displayed in a colonial museums such as the Church of the Society of Jesus in Quito Ecuador. "Quito Profundo" captures the city's historic and colonial essence using stereoscopic techniques. Other notable publications include Mantra and Raíz. He was a pioneer in establishing film studies in Ecuador, having studied Radio and Television at the Universidad San Francisco de Quito and helping to create the university's first film minor in 1998.

In 2014 he was presented in Variety as one of Ecuador's most interesting talents (together with the director Diego Araujo and the actor Victor Aráuz). As a cinematographer he has collaborated with renowned Ecuadorian filmmakers such as Sebastián Cordero, Mateo Herrera, Ivan Mora Manazano and Ana Cristina Barragán. He has directed or served as cinematographer for music videos for artists such as Mateo Kingman and Gustavo Santaolalla.

Brauer has served as Director of Photography for several acclaimed Ecuadorian films, including: Octopus Skin (La piel pulpo (2022), Alba (2016), Cenizas (2018), Agujero Negro (2018), A estas alturas de la vida (2013). Brauer has extended his expertise to music videos, documentaries, and short films, including Metamorfosis (2022), El invento de la soledad (2021), and Nictofilia (2023). His multifaceted involvement in these formats often combines cinematography with production roles, contributing to a diverse body of work in Ecuadorian audiovisual media.

In 2020, Brauer achieved a historic milestone at the Colibrí Awards gala by securing four nominations in the same category. He competed against himself for the Best Cinematography statuette for his work on the feature films Cenizas (Ashes, which won the award), Agujero Negro (Black Hole), Alba, and From Core to Sun.

In 2024, his work in the film industry earned him a Platino Award nomination for Best Cinematography. This recognition was for his cinematographic work on the film La piel pulpo (The Octopus Skin), directed by Ana Cristina Barragán.

Brauer has also ventured into the world of distilled spirits, serving as a "master blender" for the Ecuadorian ultra premium rum, Teorema, with the same one that won a gold medal at the prestigious Spirits Selection by Concours Mondial de Bruxelles competition in 2025.
