= The Other Son =

The Other Son may refer to:

- The Other Son (2012 film), French film
- The Other Son (2023 film), international co-production film
