= Abinadi Meza =

American sound artist and filmmaker (born 1977)

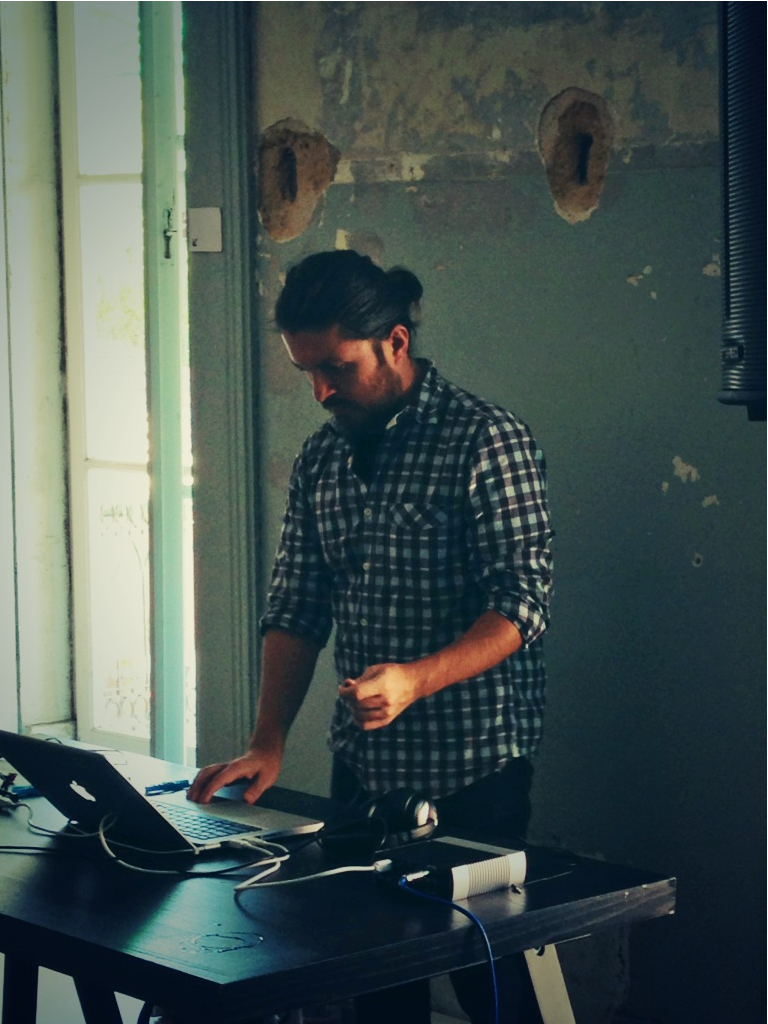
Sound artist Abinadi Meza performing at Sinel de Cordes Palace, Lisbon Architecture Triennale, 2013

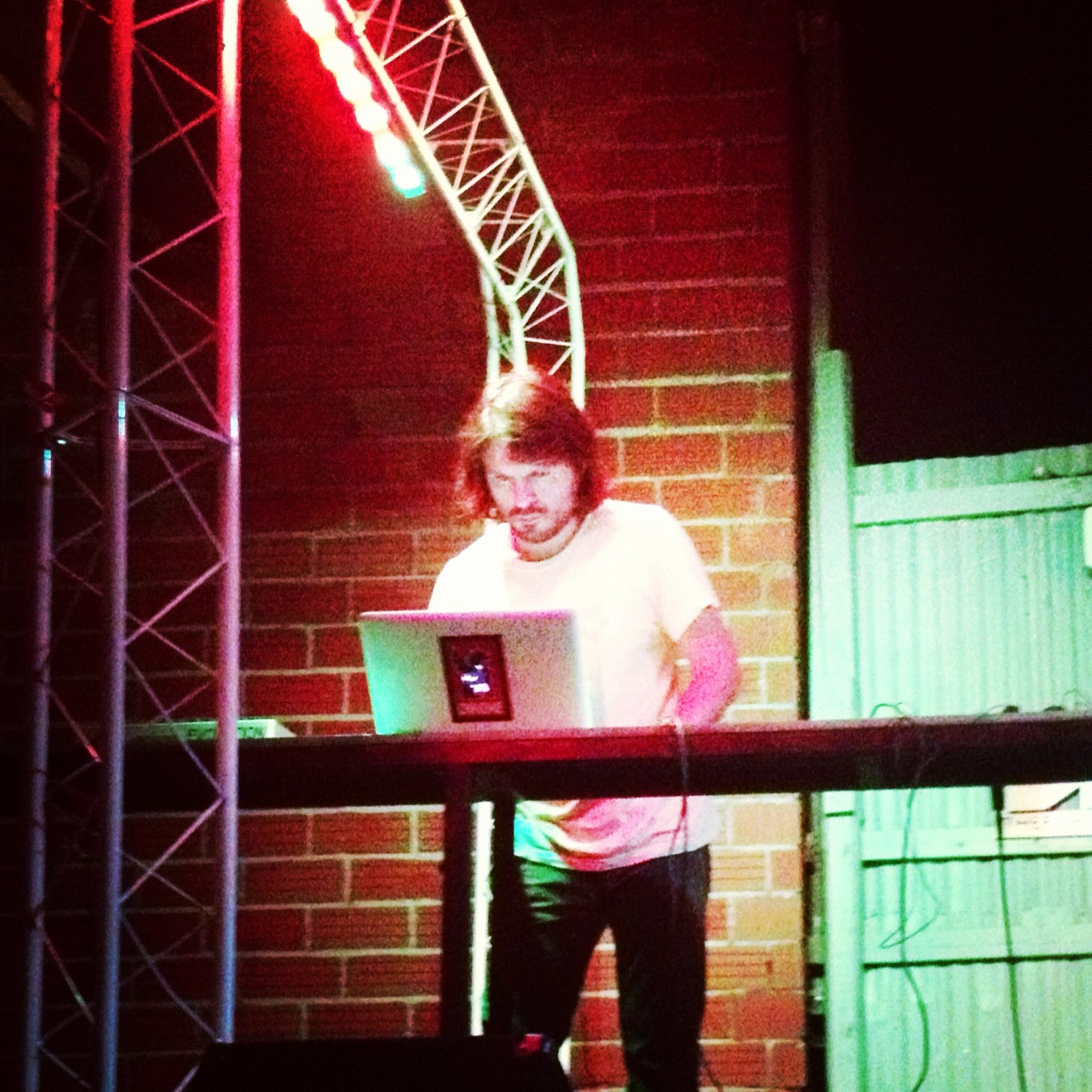
Sound performance, Austin, Texas (USA) 2012

Abinadi Meza (born 1976 in Chicago, Illinois) is an American visual artist, sound artist, and experimental filmmaker whose works focus on transformation, spatial politics, and poetics. His films, sound art, performances, and installations have been presented at Anthology Film Archives, New York; Brooklyn Film Festival, New York; MAXXI, Rome; Matadero Madrid; Cinemateca Nacional del Ecuador, Quito; Cinemateca do Museu de Arte Moderna, Rio de Janeiro; SF Cinematheque, San Francisco; Walker Art Center, Minneapolis; American Academy in Rome; Irish Museum of Modern Art, Dublin; Blaffer Art Museum, Houston; FACT, Liverpool; La Casa Encendida, Madrid; Minneapolis Institute of Arts; Mexic-Arte Museum, Austin; New Orleans Film Festival; La Casa Encendida, Madrid, and Lisbon Architecture Triennale. Meza primarily uses ephemeral, precarious, site-specific and salvaged materials in his work. As a young artist Meza studied Butoh with teachers from Japan, Europe and South America. Later he earned a Bachelor of Arts degree from the University of Northern Iowa, (1999); a Master of Fine Arts degree from the University of Minnesota (2004); and a Master of Architecture degree from SCI-Arc, the Southern California Institute of Architecture(2009). Meza's family background is Native American, Portuguese, Moroccan, and Russian.

Meza is a professor of Interdisciplinary Practices and Emerging Forms in the School of Art at the University of Houston. In 2014 he was awarded a Rome Prize in Visual Art by the American Academy in Rome. In 2021 his book Manual For a Future Desert was published by Mousse Publishing, Milan, Italy.

== Selected filmography ==
- Snow, 2001
- All Light is Late, 2001
- Sonnambula, 2001
- Marco Polo, 2002
- The City in Which I Find You, 2002
- Double Blind, 2004
- The Prisoner, 2005
- Seeing is Dreaming, 2006
- Silence, 2006
- Left Songs, 2006
- Beacon, 2007
- Sound Sweep, 2009
- Like Snow Falling, 2010
- News From Home, 2012
- Black Box Recorder, 2012
- Hour Between Dog and Wolf, 2013
- Melencholia, 2013
- The Dream Surplus I, 2013
- Ghost Station, 2014
- Air, Condition, 2014
- Hand By Hand, 2015
- Nocturne, 2015
- The Dream Surplus II, 2017
- Monuments in Reverse, 2017
- The Dream Surplus III, 2019
- Time Crystals, 2021
- Surrounded by Colors We Could No Longer See, 2023
- Umbrella Music, 2023
- Tlaloc (Lines Drawn in Water), 2023
- Parangolé, 2023

== Selected Sound Performances/Concerts ==
- American Academy in Rome
- Contemporary Arts Museum Houston
- Deep Wireless Festival of Radio & Transmission Art (Toronto)
- Ende Tymes Festival of Noise & Experimental Liberation (Brooklyn)
- FILE Festival/Hipersonica (São Paulo)
- Helicotrema Festival (Italy)
- Lisbon Architecture Triennale (Portugal)
- Matadero Madrid
- MAXXI Muesum (Rome)
- O' (Milan)
- Radio Kinesonus (Tokyo)
- Radiophrenia (Glasgow)
- Radius FM (Chicago)
- Scaniaparken (Mälmo)
- Sonorities Festival (Belfast)
- Walker Art Center (Minneapolis)
