= Premios 40 Principales for Best Ecuadorian Act =

Spanish music award

- Awarded for: Best in Spanish and International music
- Country: Spain/America
- Presented by: Los 40 Principales
- First award: 2008
- Website: www.premios40principales.es

The Premios 40 Principales for Best Ecuadorian Act was an honor presented annually at Los Premios 40 Principales España between 2008 and 2011, and later reemerging in 2014 as part of Los Premios 40 Principales América.

Year	Winner	Other nominees
Los Premios 40 Principales España
2008	Fausto Miño	Daniel Betancourth; Chaucha; Papá Changó; Rockvox
2009	Mirella Cesa	Xauxa Kings; Israel Brito; Daniel Betancourth; Fausto Miño
2010	Norka	Caalu; Tercer Mundo; Fausto Miño; Daniel Betancourth
2011	Brito	Daniel Betancourth; Karla Kanora; Daniel Páez; Papá Chango
Los Premios 40 Principales América
2014	Daniel Páez	David Cañizares; Maykel; Daniel Betancourth; Nikki Macliff
