= Andrés Crespo (actor) =

Ecuadorian actor

Andrés Crespo Arosemena
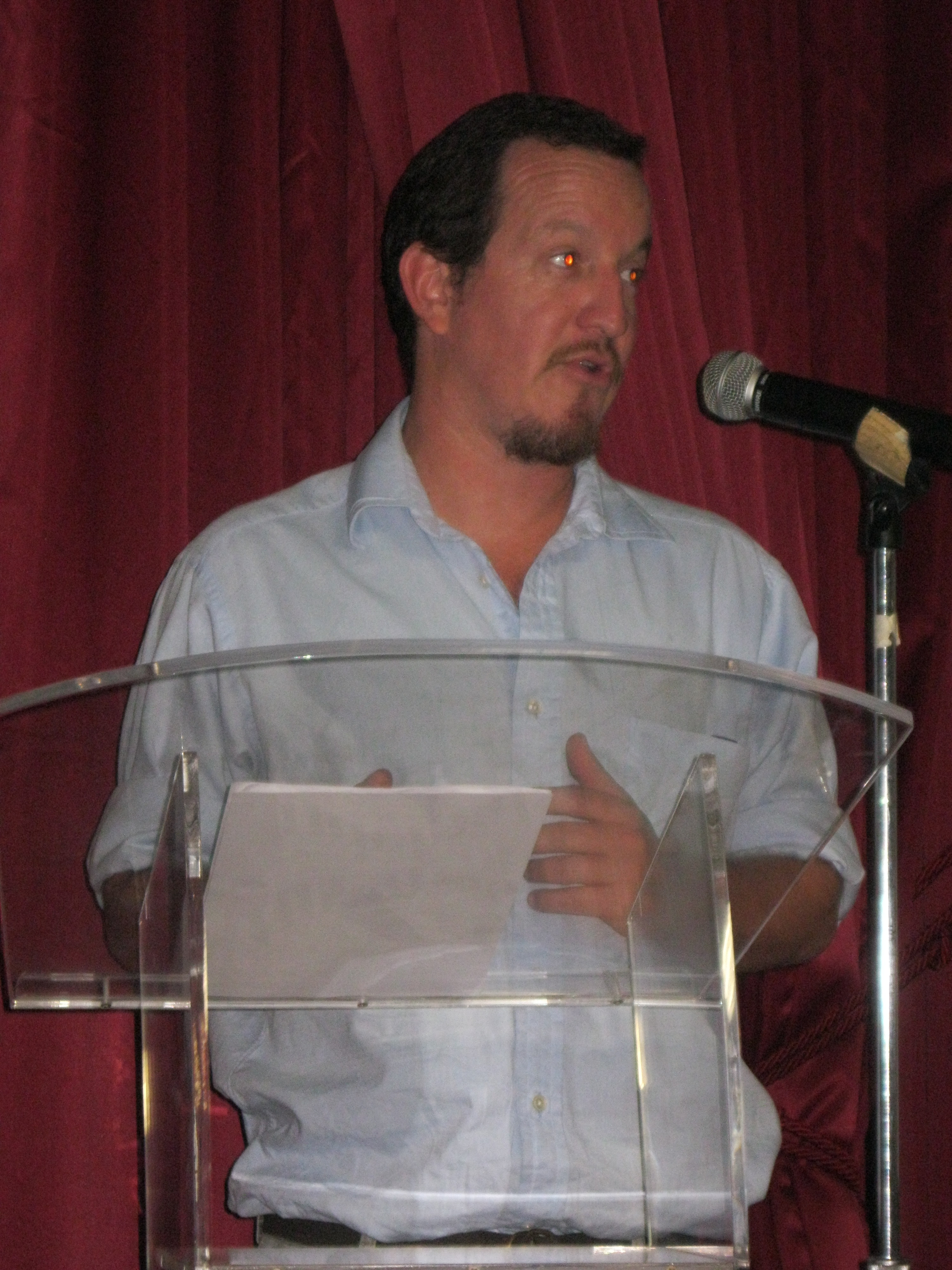
- Andrés Crespo in 2012
- Born: Guayaquil, Ecuador

Andrés Crespo Arosemena is an Ecuadorian actor, director, writer and broadcaster.

== Biography ==
Crespo studied law at the University of Guayaquil for two semesters. After retiring from the university, at age 19, he dedicated himself to surfing.

In 1998 he made a short film called Niño Danny. In 2000 he conducted a 14-minute documentary called Sonnya which won an award at the Festival of Octahedron, in Quito. Then he made a short film called Filo de toilette, which appeared in the International Film Festival of Cuenca.

In 2004 he acted as a prisoner in the film Crónicas. Crespo also had the role in the 2009 film, Prometheus deported. In 2010 a documentary entitled Beyond The Mall. In 2011 he played the role of judge Neira in the movie Without Autumn, Without Spring, also had a starring role in the film by Sebastián Cordero, Fisherman, as Blanquito. Managed the post-production of the movie Let's not talk about certain things and played Lagarto. Also handled the post- production of the film Ochetaisiete in 2012 and played the character of Juan's dad.

== Filmography ==
- Crónicas (2004)
- Prometeo Deportado (2010)
- Pescador (2011)
- Sin Otoño, Sin Primavera (2012)
- Mejor no hablar de ciertas cosas (2013)
- Secretos (2013-2014)
- Ochenta y siete (2014)
- Feriado (2014)
- Instantánea (2016)
- Sin muertos no hay carnaval (2016)
- Enchufe.tv: Las Amigas de Camilo con Blanquito (special appearance)
- Narcos (2017)
