= Eva Doesn't Sleep =

- Argentine theatrical release poster
- Spanish: Eva no duerme
- Directed by: Pablo Agüero
- Written by: Pablo Agüero
- Screenplay by: Ivan Gierasinchuk
- Produced by: Vanessa Ragone; Jacques Bidou; Marianne Dumoulin
- Starring: Gael García Bernal; Denis Lavant; Daniel Fanego; Imanol Arias; Sofía Brito; Nicolas Goldschmidt; Sabrina Machi; Ailín Salas
- Cinematography: Iván Gierasinchuk
- Edited by: Stephane Elmadjian
- Music by: Valentin Portron
- Production companies: JBA Production; Haddock Films; Pyramide; Tornasol; Tita B Productions
- Distributed by: Distribution Company (Argentina); Sildavia Cinema (Spain); Pyramide Distribution (France)
- Release dates: 12 September 2015 (TIFF); 5 November 2015 (Argentina); 12 February 2016 (Spain); 6 April 2016 (France)
- Running time: 85 minutes
- Countries: Argentina; Spain; France
- Language: Spanish

Eva Doesn't Sleep (Spanish: Eva no duerme) is a 2015 drama film written and directed by Pablo Agüero. The film stars Gael García Bernal and Denis Lavant.

== Plot ==
The film details the fate of the corpse of Eva Perón, from her death on July 26, 1952 to the final arrival to the La Recoleta Cemetery in October 1976, where it has been located since then. The plot is divided in three short chapters, starring the embalmer of her corpse, the military that takes it to a secret location, and the kidnapping of Pedro Eugenio Aramburu by revolutionaries.

== Production ==
The lead actress of the film is Sabrina Macchi, who plays Eva Perón. Initially, she took part in the casting of another character, but the director Pablo Agüero thought that she would be a good actress for Evita's role. She underwent a strict training to control her breathing, keep her eyelids quiet and avoid swallowing saliva.

The film is also starred by Gael García Bernal, who plays the admiral Emilio Eduardo Massera. His character is the narrator of the first part of the film.

It is the third film of the director Pablo Agüero, whose previous films (Salamandra and 77 Doronship) had an experimental style. This film aims at bigger audiences than the previous ones. The film was made after four years of historical research.

== Reception ==
Pyramide Films bought the rights to distribute the film in France.

The Hollywood Reporter described the film as "kinky, creepy and revolutionary". It also pointed that the film is closer to experimental cinema than mainstream. Diana Sanchez said that "Bold and original, and boasting brilliant set pieces, [...] Eva Doesn't Sleep showcases the talents of one of Argentina's most visionary and politically engaged cinematic voices". Ben Nicholson from Cine Vue considers that the third portion of the film has a lower quality than the previous ones.
