= Emptiness (film) =

2020 film

- Film poster
- Directed by: Paul Venegas
- Written by: Carlos Andres Terán Vargas; Paúl Venegas; Martín Salinas
- Produced by: Paúl Venegas
- Starring: Jing Fu; Lidan Zhu; Day Min Meng; Ricardo Velasteguí
- Cinematography: Simon Brauer
- Edited by: Felipe Guerrero
- Music by: Victor Andrade
- Release date: 3 January 2020
- Running time: 92 minutes
- Country: Ecuador
- Languages: Mandarin; Spanish

Emptiness (Spanish: Vacío) is a 2020 Ecuadorian drama film directed by Paul Venegas. It was selected as the Ecuadorian entry for the Best International Feature Film at the 93rd Academy Awards, but it was not nominated.

== Synopsis ==
Two Chinese immigrants newly arrived in Ecuador find themselves under the thumb of an obsessive gangster.

== See also ==
- List of submissions to the 93rd Academy Awards for Best International Feature Film
- List of Ecuadorian submissions for the Academy Award for Best International Feature Film
