= Submersible (film) =

2020 film

- Theatrical release poster
- Directed by: Alfredo León León
- Written by: Daniela Granja Núñez; Alfredo León León
- Produced by: Sebastián Cordero; Juan Pablo Solano; Arturo Yépez
- Starring: Natalia Reyes; Leynar Gómez; Carlos Valencia; José Restrepo
- Cinematography: Daniel Avilés Escobar
- Music by: Felipe Linares
- Release date: 13 July 2020 (BiFan)
- Running time: 100 minutes
- Country: Ecuador
- Language: Spanish

Submersible (Spanish: Sumergible) is a 2020 Ecuadorian thriller drama film directed by Alfredo León León. It was selected as the Ecuadorian entry for the Best International Feature Film at the 94th Academy Awards.

== Plot ==
With their narco-submarine on the verge of sinking, three crew members discover a young girl bound and gagged in a cargo hold.

== Cast ==
- Natalia Reyes
- Leynar Gómez

== Reception ==
Variety called the film "A grimy, claustrophobic, deeply generic submarine thriller".

== See also ==
- List of submissions to the 94th Academy Awards for Best International Feature Film
- List of Ecuadorian submissions for the Academy Award for Best International Feature Film
