= November (2025 film) =

2025 Spanish drama film

- Directed by: Tomás Corredor
- Release date: 5 September 2025 (TIFF)
- Countries: Mexico, Brazil, Norway, Colombia
- Language: Spanish

November (Spanish: Noviembre) is a 2025 Spanish drama film written and directed by Tomás Corredor in his feature debut.

== Premise ==
The film follows a woman who returns to her hometown after many years away, confronting unresolved memories and the emotional legacy of her past.

== Cast ==
- Santiago Alarcón as Magistrado Gaona
- Natalia Reyes as Clara Helena
- Max Duran as César
- Juan Morales as José
- Alejandro Cuétara as Magistrado Camacho
- Jagdy López as Nelfi
- Iozé Peñaloza as Carlos

== Release ==
Noviembre had its world premiere at the 2025 Toronto International Film Festival.
