= Ratas, ratones, rateros =

- Directed by: Sebastián Cordero
- Written by: Sebastián Cordero
- Produced by: Isabel Dávalos; Lisandra Rivera
- Starring: Carlos Valencia; Marco Bustos
- Cinematography: Matthew Jensen
- Edited by: Sebastián Cordero; Mateo Herrera
- Music by: Hugo Idrovo; Sergio Sacoto-Arias
- Distributed by: HBO Latino
- Release date: 1999
- Running time: 107 minutes
- Country: Ecuador
- Language: Spanish

Ratas, ratones, rateros (Spanish: "Rats, Mice, Petty Thieves") is a 1999 Ecuadorian crime drama film written and directed by Sebastián Cordero and starring Carlos Valencia and Marco Bustos. It was shown at the 1999 Bogotá Film Festival but did not receive a wide release until 2001. It was nominated for Best Film of the Year in 2001 by the Spanish Goya Awards. It was described as the first Ecuadorian film with international-standard production values.

The plot follows the life of Salvador (Bustos), a young petty thief from Quito, after he is visited by his cousin Ángel (Valencia), an ex-convict with a bounty on his head.

Settings of Ratas, ratones, rateros within Ecuador

== Cast ==
- Simón Brauer as J.C.
- Marco Bustos as Salvador
- Cristina Dávila as Mayra
- Fabricio Lalama as Marlon
- Irina López as Carolina
- Antonio Negret as Martin
- Carlos Valencia as Angel

== See also ==
- Cinema of Ecuador
