= Leovanna Orlandini =

Ecuadorian model (born 1978)

Leovanna Orlandini Febres-Cordero
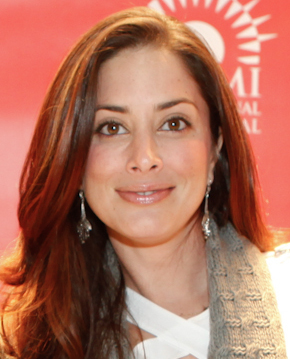
- Born: Leovanna Orlandini; August 27, 1978 (age 48); Guayaquil, Ecuador
- Height: 1.80 m (5 ft 11 in)
- Beauty pageant titleholder
- Hair color: Brown
- Eye color: Brown
- Major competitions: Miss Ecuador 2003 (2nd Runner-up) (Miss Sedal) (Miss Photogenic)

Leovanna Orlandini Febres-Cordero (born August 27, 1978 in Guayaquil) is a former Miss Ecuador contestant, international model, architect, and actress, also she is known for being León Febres-Cordero's granddaughter.

== Early life ==
Leovanna was born in Guayaquil on August 27, 1978; she is León Febres-Cordero grand daughter. She is graduated as Architect in UESS and she is an international model.

== Miss Ecuador ==
Orlandini competed in Miss Ecuador 2003 where she was 2nd Runner-up. She has also won Miss Sedal and Miss Photogenic awards.

== Actress ==
Orlandini is also an actress, she played as Lucía in Porcelain Horse film.
