= Natalia Reyes =

Colombian actress

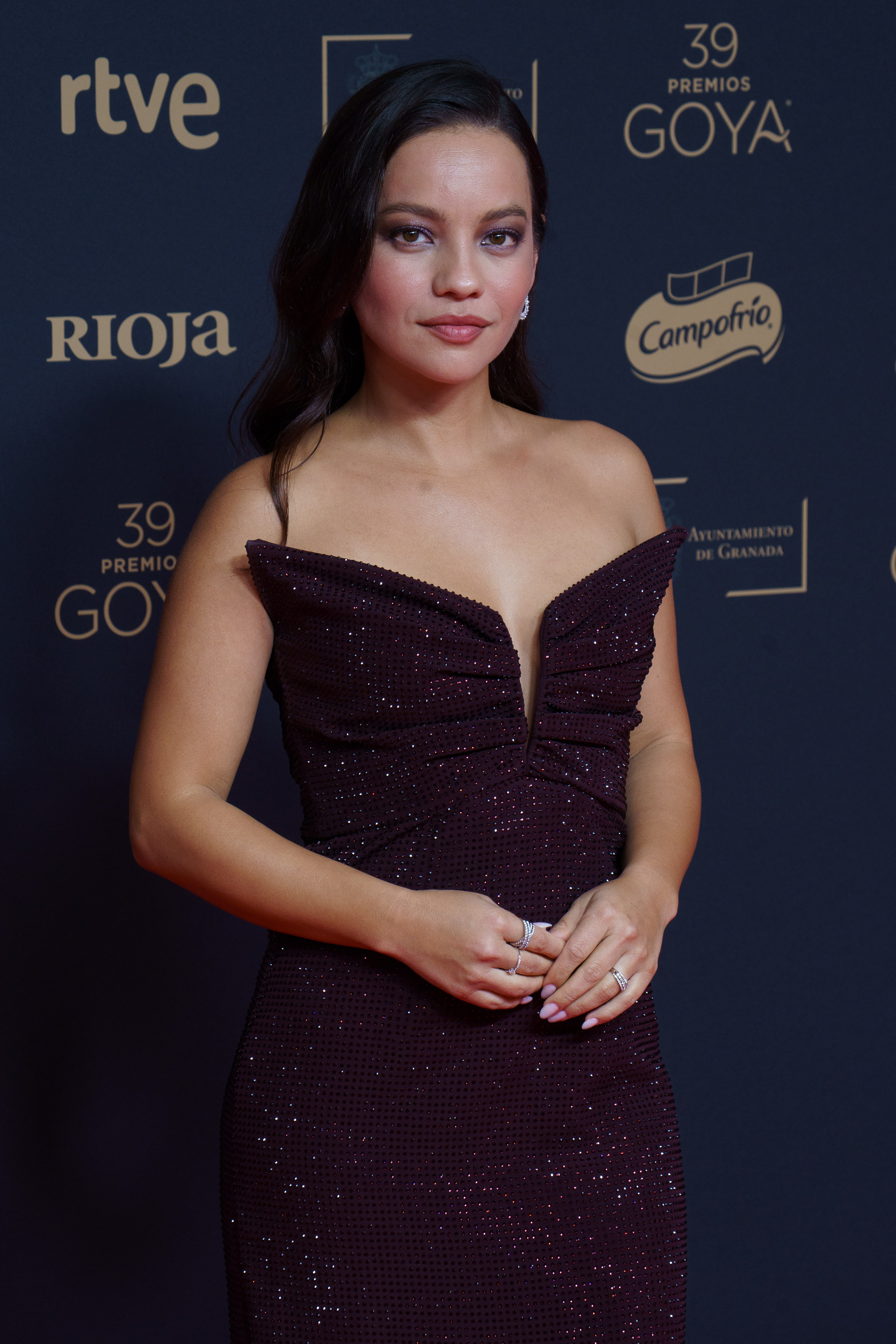
- Reyes in 2025
- Born: Natalia Reyes Gaitán; 6 February 1987 (age 39); Bogotá, Colombia
- Occupation: Actress
- Years active: 1995–present
- Spouse: Juan Pedro San Segundo (m. 2016)
- Children: 1

Natalia Reyes Gaitán (born 6 February 1987) is a Colombian actress known for her role in Terminator: Dark Fate (2019). Before that, she was known in Latin America for her role in Birds of Passage (2018); and for starring on the Sony Pictures Television series Lady, la vendedora de rosas. She is also known in her native country for other television shows such as Isa TK+, Dulce amor, and Cumbia Ninja on Fox.

== Personal life ==
In 2009, Reyes met Juan Pedro San Segundo in Cartagena when Juan was the organizer of a music festival at the time. They married in 2016.

In September 2021, the couple announced the birth of their first child, a daughter.

== Filmography ==
=== Film ===
Year	Title	Role	Notes
2018	Pickpockets	Juana	
2018	Birds of Passage	Zaida	
2019	Running with the Devil	The Woman	
2019	Terminator: Dark Fate	Daniella "Dani" Ramos	
2020	Sumergible		
2024	Tomorrow Before After	Woman	
2025	Shadow Force	Moriti	
2025	November	Clara Helena	
2025	It Would Be Night in Caracas	Adelaida	
2026	Better Class	Paz	

=== Television ===
Year	Title	Role	Notes
2006	Las profesionales, a su servicio	Sharon Janeth Sasá	
2008	Muñoz vale por 2	Vanessa Muñoz	
2009	Todas odian a Bermúdez	Marcela Delgado	
2009–10	Isa TK+	Fabiana Medina	Recurring role
2009	Pandillas guerra y paz	María Fernanda	
2013	A mano limpia	Ana Lucía Giraldo	
2013–15	Cumbia Ninja	Jéssica	Main cast
2014	Dulce amor	Florencia Guerrero	
2015	Lady, la vendedora de rosas	Lady Tabares	Main cast
2016–17	2091	Roda	Main cast
2017	El Comandante	Carolina Jiménez	
2026	Palacio	Pilar Navarrete	
