= Fausto Miño =

Ecuadorian singer and actor

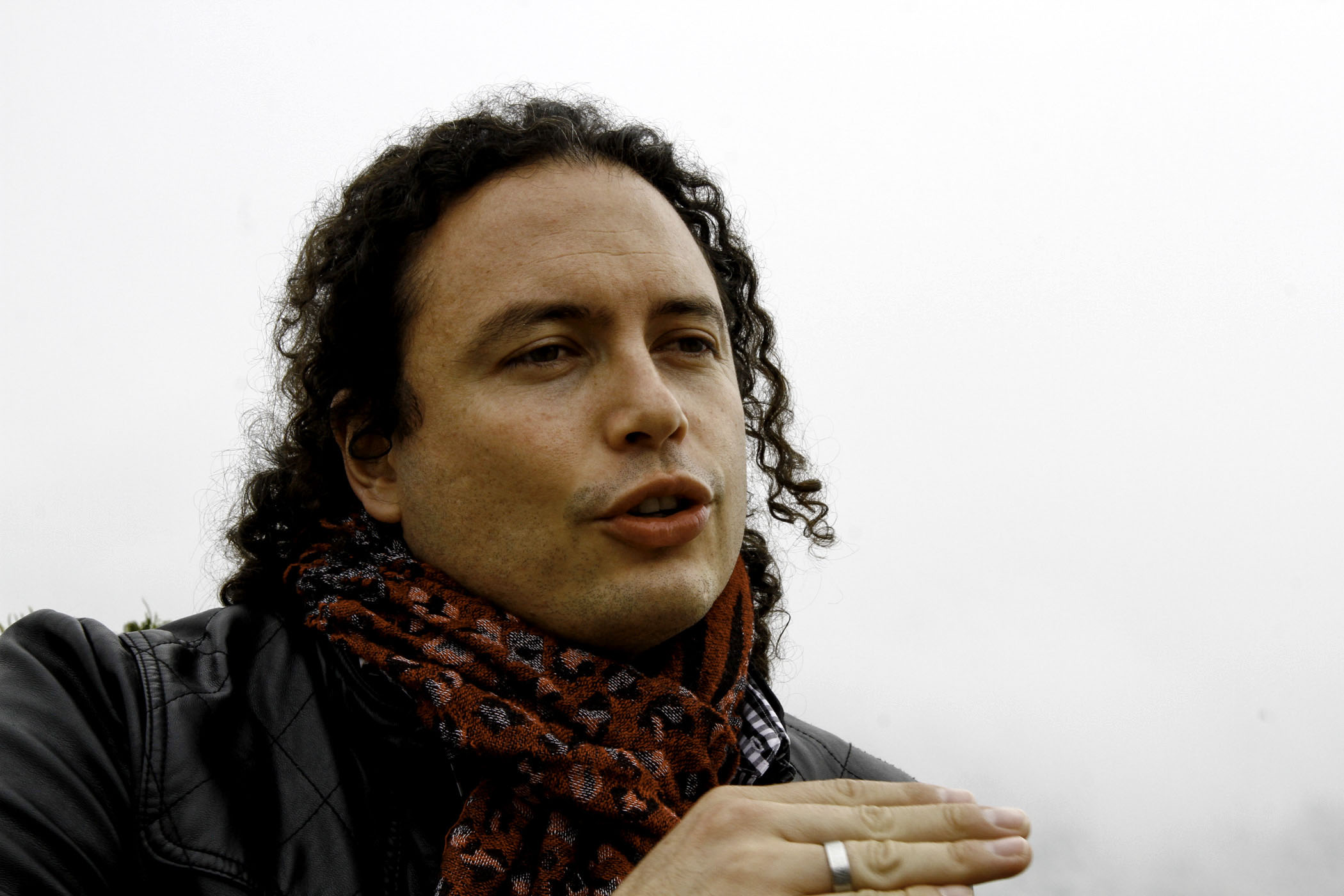

Background information
- Birth name: Fausto Orlando Miño
- Born: June 8, 1980 (age 44); Ambato, Ecuador
- Genres: Pop, Pop rock
- Years active: 2006–present
- Labels: Universal Music Group

Fausto Miño (born 8 June 1980) is an Ecuadorian singer and actor, he won the Quinde de Oro Award.

== Biography ==
Fausto Miño was born in 1980 in Ambato, Tungurahua Province, Ecuador, son of a Quiteño (a person from Quito) father and a manabita (Chone) mother. He began to compose and play music at the age of 15, thanks to a neighbor's influence, with whom he learned to play the guitar. With only three chords he was able to compose 22 songs. Thereafter he composed more songs, now holding a repertoire of 70 songs. He also participated in the movie "Qué tan lejos", directed by Tania Hermida, in which he was a supporting actor playing an egotistical and superficial character. He received the "Quinde de Oro" which took place at Itchimbía on August 12–13. He also participated in the promotion of "Enseñame y Aprendere", theme of the campaign "Niño deesperanza" with UNICEF and Ecuavisa. Now he is taking part of the Gamavision TV show "Bailando por un sueño".

Guido Ditto is his cousin. Alexandra Castillo calls him "El Churoncito"

== Discography ==
Serracosteño : His first album has 8 songs. The CD is named for his roots. In this first album, the cumbia and "son" rhythms prevail. He started to work in this album in 2003 with Diego Acosta. This CD includes singles like Mara Rocío named "Baila mi vida".
