= Dulce amor (Colombian TV series) =

- Genre: Telenovela; Drama
- Created by: Enrique Estevanez
- Directed by: Alejandro Vasquely
- Starring: Andrés Sandoval; Marianela González; Juan Manuel Mendoza; Abril Schretber
- Country of origin: Colombia
- Original language: Spanish
- No. of episodes: 124

Production
- Executive producer: Unai Amushastegui
- Production location: Bogotá

Original release
- Network: Caracol Televisión
- Release: July 21, 2015 – January 15, 2016

Related
- Dulce amor El amor lo manejo yo Hasta el fin del mundo

Dulce amor is a Colombian telenovela produced by Unai Amushastegui for Caracol Televisión. It is based on the soap opera of the same name produced in Argentina by Enrique Estevanez.

== Plot ==
Lack of money, the loss of supporters, and household debts that must be paid force Martin Guerrero to give up his race car driving to become executive Natalia Toledo's chauffeur. In spite of the endless list of the "doctora's" demands, Martin's bad habit of breaking the rules, and the many differences between the two, Natalia and Martin discover that they make a perfect couple. The Toledo women are united by a love of racing and four generations of falling in love with the wrong man. Together with the residents of a popular barrio, they will find the happiness they were seeking as they unite to achieve the same goal: the return of Martin and Julián to the races.

== Cast ==
- Andrés Sandoval as Martín Guerrero
- Marianela González as Natalia Toledo
- Juan Manuel Mendoza as Julián
- Juan Pablo Barragán as Gonzalo
- Abril Schretber as Juliana Toledo
- Camila Zarate as Veronica Toledo
- José Julián Gaviria as Lucas
- Miguel González as Ciro
- Alberto Barrero as Agustín
- Kristina Lilley as Helena Toledo
- Jean Philippe Conan as Freddy
- Arnold Cantillo as Álvarez
- Yaneth Waldman as Emilia Toledo
- Valentina Lizcano as Amanda
- Jimmy Vásquez as Lorenzo
- Freddy Ordóñez as Terco
- Marta Liliana Ruiz as Isabel
- Astrid Junguito as Rosa
- Álex Gil as Adrián
- Juan Esteban Aponte as «Betico» López
- Ella Becerra as Gabriela
- Natalia Reyes as Florencia «Flor» Guerrero
- Paola Díaz as Alicia
- Liliana Castrillón as Noelia Fernández
