= Juan Valdano Morejón =

Ecuadorian writer

Juan Valdano Morejón (born 1939) is an Ecuadorian writer. He was born in Cuenca in 1939. He studied at the University of Cuenca (winning the Benigno Malo award for best graduate), Complutense University of Madrid and the University of Aix-en-Provence. He taught literature and literary theory at the University of Cuenca and at the Pontificia Universidad Católica del Ecuador.

He has published some 20 books in a variety of genres: novels, short stories and essays. He has won several literary awards, among them

- Premio Nacional José de la Cuadra for the short story collection Las huellas recogidas (1989)
- Condecoración al Mérito Cultural for the novel Anillos de serpiente (1998)
- Premio Nacional Joaquín Gallegos Lara also for Anillos de serpiente (1998)

Other notable works include La celada, Juegos de Proteo, and the novel Mientras llega el día, which was adapted to the cinema in 2004 by the director Camilo Luzuriaga.

He is a member of the National Academy of History of Ecuador and a corresponding member of the Colombian Academy of History and the Royal Academy of History. He is also a Full Member of the Ecuadorian Academy of the Language and corresponding Member of the Royal Spanish Academy. He has been an opinion columnist for the newspaper El Comercio of Quito since 2010.

He has also received honours such as the José Peralta National Prize, the Fray Vicente Solano award and the National Award for Cultural Merit. In August 2020, Juan Valdano received the Eugenio Espejo national prize in literature, conferred by then-president of Ecuador Lenin Moreno.
