= Camilo Luzuriaga =

Ecuadorian film producer, actor, writer, photographer and director (born 1953)

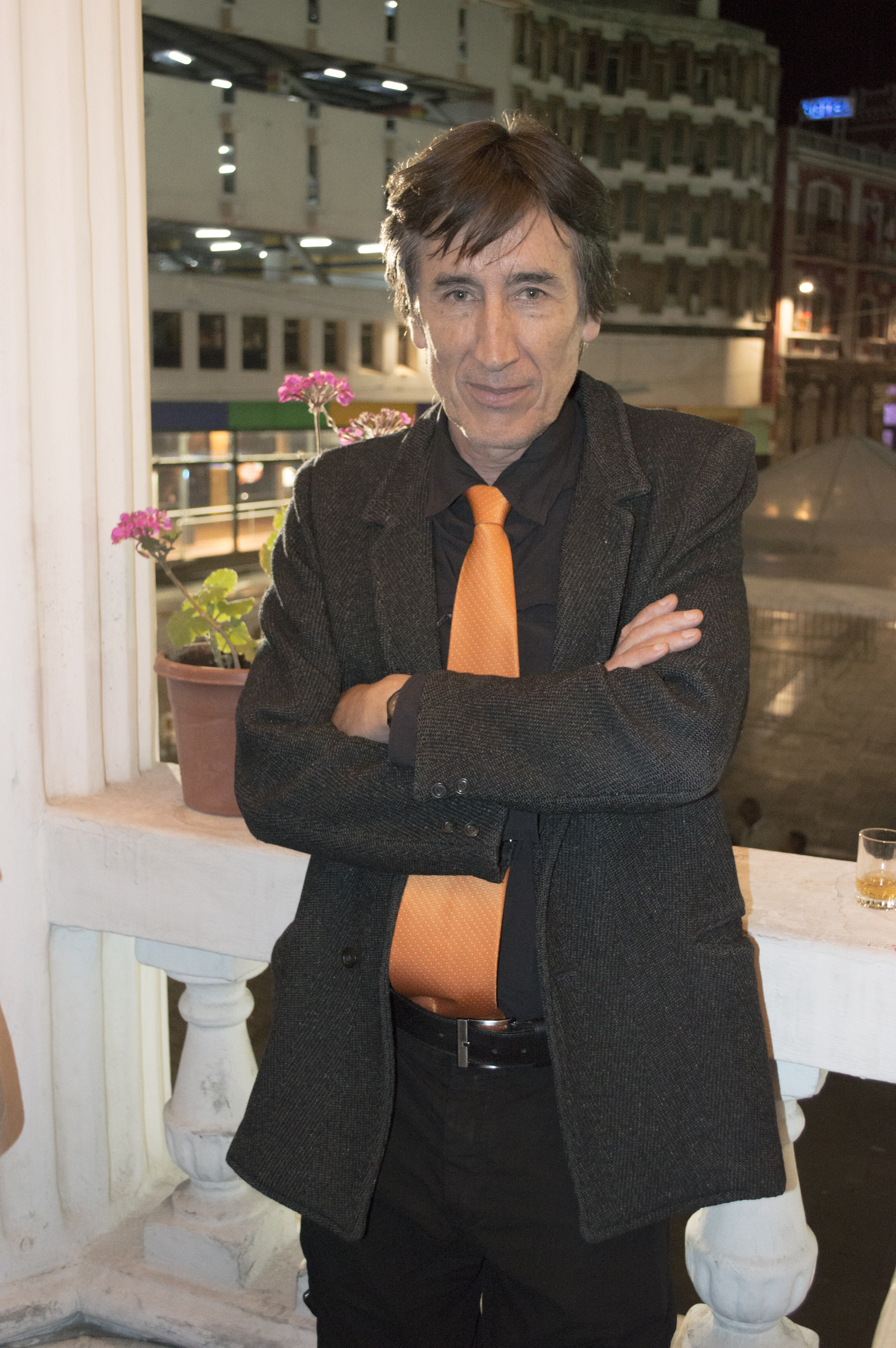
- Born: 1953 (age 72–73); Loja, Ecuador
- Occupations: Director and producer
- Notable work: La Tigra (1989), Entre Marx y Una Mujer Desnuda (1996),

Camilo Luzuriaga (born in Loja, Ecuador 1953) is an Ecuadorian film producer, actor, writer, photographer, and director.

== Filmmaking ==
Luzuriaga has produced, directed, edited, and written various movies, short films, and documentaries.

Luzuriaga's directorial debut was the film adaption of José de la Cuadra's novelette La Tigra (1989), which starred Lissette Cabrera, was hailed by critics as the rebirth of Ecuadorian cinema. One of his most renowned films is Entre Marx y Una Mujer Desnuda (Between Marx and a Naked Woman) (1996) based on the 1976 novel written by the Ecuadorian writer Jorge Enrique Adoum. The film is in Spanish with English and French subtitles. The film won Best Art Direction at the 18th Havana Film Festival, Best Script and Best Sound Track at the Trieste Film Festival, and was Nominated for Best Foreign Film by the Spanish Academy of Arts and Cinematographic Sciences, 1997. Michael Wilmington of the Chicago Tribune called the film, "One of the fest's major surprises is this startlingly inventive and sophisticated, beautifully done film from tiny Ecuador... packed with wit, energy, passion, intelligence, high style and memorable characters... the movie is wildly creative and funny."

Luzuriaga adapted an historical novel by Juan Valdano into the film, 1809-1810 mientras llega el día (2004) which related the story of the independence of Quito.

He played Captain Bolivar Rojas in the movie Chronicles directed by Sebastián Cordero starring John Leguizamo. He was also the local producer of Proof of Life directed by Taylor Hackford starring Meg Ryan and Russell Crowe.

== Photography career ==
Luzuriaga has been a photographer since 1971, and has had five solo exhibitions. He organized the First Contemporary National Photography Festival in Ecuador (1982). He was a photography teacher at the Central University's School of Art in Quito until 1987, at the Catholic University's School of Design in Quito until 1994 and at the Film and Acting Workshop until 2002.

== Awards ==
- Best Art Direction, 18th Havana Film Festival. "Between Marx and a Naked Woman" (1996) Director and producer.
- Best Screenplay and Best Sound Track, 12th Trieste Film Festival. "Between Marx and a Naked Woman" (1996) Director and producer.
- Best Film and Best Opera Prima, 29th Cartagena Film Festival. "The Tigress" (1990) Writer and director.
- Best educational film, 6th Havana Film Festival. "The Mangroves Are Going" (1984) Co-director and editor.
- Second Best Film, 2nd Film Festival of the Indian People, Rio de Janeiro. "This Is What We Think" (1983) Director and editor.
- Best Children's Film, Tampere Film Festival, Finland. "Wonder Chacón" (1982) Co-director and editor.
- Second Best Film, 2nd Ecuadorian Film Festival. "Don Eloy" (1981) Co-director and editor.
- Best Super-8 Film, First Ecuadorian Film Festival. "Cañari Land", documentary film (1977) Filmmaker.

== Filmography ==
Producer

- Huellas (2012) producer (trailer on YouTube)
- Distante Cercanía: La ley del más vivo (2012) associate producer (trailer)
- Jericó (Short) (2012) (producer)
- Touché (Video short) (2011) executive producer
- Nubes distantes (Short) (2010) producer
- Bienaventurados (Short) (2010) producer
- Rendiciones (Short) (2010) producer
- Los Canallas (2009) - producer (trailer on YouTube)
- Proof of Life (2000) local producer (trailer on YouTube)

Director

- 1809-1810 mientras llega el día (2004) (trailer on YouTube)
- Cara o cruz (2003) (trailer on YouTube)
- Entre Marx y Una Mujer Desnuda (1996) (trailer on YouTube)
- La tigra (1990) (trailer)

Writer

- 1809-1810 mientras llega el día (2004) adaptation
- Cara o cruz (2003) writer
- La tigra (1989)

Actor

- Ochentaysiete (2012) role: father of Andrés
- Crónicas (2004) role: Captain Bolivar Rojas (trailer on YouTube)
