= Such Is Life in the Tropics =

2016 film

- Film poster
- Directed by: Sebastián Cordero
- Written by: Sebastián Cordero
- Starring: Diego Cataño
- Release date: 2 September 2016
- Country: Ecuador
- Language: Spanish

Such Is Life in the Tropics (Spanish: Sin Muertos No Hay Carnaval) is a 2016 Ecuadorian thriller film directed by Sebastián Cordero. It was selected as the Ecuadorian entry for the Best Foreign Language Film at the 89th Academy Awards but it was not nominated.

== Cast ==
- Diego Cataño
- Maya Zapata
- Andrés Crespo
- Erando González
- Daniel Adum Gilbert
- Victor Arauz
- Antonella Valeriano
- Andrea Casierra

== See also ==
- List of submissions to the 89th Academy Awards for Best Foreign Language Film
- List of Ecuadorian submissions for the Academy Award for Best Foreign Language Film
