= Feriado =

Feriado (English: Holiday) is a 2014 Ecuadorian coming-of-age drama, written and directed by Diego Araujo. The film had its world premiere at the Berlinale, the 2014 Berlin International Film Festival. The film was nominated for the Teddy Award at the Berlinale, which recognizes films with LGBTQ themes.

== Cast ==
- Juan Arregui as Juan Pablo (billed as Juan Manuel Arregui)
- Elena Vargas as Ana
- Cristina Morrison as Aunt Victoria
- Peki Andino as Uncle Jorge (billed as Peky Andino)
- Canela Samaniego as Maribel
- Manuela Merchán as La Flaca
- Irwin Ortiz as Jorgito
- Francisco Perez as Michel (billed as Francisco Pérez Uscocovich)
- Sami Maigua as Susi
- Anne-Dominique Correa as Kiki
- Amado Silva as Edmundo
- Said López as Chava
- Diego Andrés Paredes as Juano
- Joshi Espinoza as Byron
- Pepe Alvear as El Pichi (billed as José Alvear)
- Alfredo Espinosa as Police Guard
- Isabel Sangacha as Mamá
- Julia Vargas as Nurse
- Andrés Crespo as Guardia de motel
- Rosa María Ramón as Mama Rosa
- Alejandra Coral Mantilla as Reportera
- Gonzalo Flores as Priest
- Eduardo Farina as Altar Boy
- Gabriela Córdova Dávalos as Ingrid
- Stephanie W. Chugulí as Grace
