= Silence in Dreamland =

2013 film

- Film poster
- Spanish: Silencio en la tierra de los sueños
- Directed by: Tito Molina
- Written by: Tito Molina
- Starring: Bertha Naranjo
- Cinematography: Tito Molina
- Edited by: Tito Molina
- Release date: 23 November 2013 (Torino)
- Running time: 94 minutes
- Country: Ecuador
- Language: Spanish

Silence in Dreamland (Spanish: Silencio en la tierra de los sueños) is a 2013 Ecuador drama film directed by Tito Molina. It was selected as the Ecuadorian entry for the Best Foreign Language Film at the 87th Academy Awards, but was not nominated.

== Cast ==
- Bertha Naranjo
- Ney Moreira
- Martín Rodríguez
- Yeliber Mero

== See also ==
- List of submissions to the 87th Academy Awards for Best Foreign Language Film
- List of Ecuadorian submissions for the Academy Award for Best Foreign Language Film
