= They Met in Guayaquil =

- Directed by: Paco Villar
- Written by: Paco Villar
- Produced by: Alberto Santana
- Production company: Ecuador Sono Films
- Release date: 1949
- Running time: 90 minutes
- Country: Ecuador
- Languages: Silent; Spanish intertitles

They Met in Guayaquil (Spanish:Se conocieron en Guayaquil) is a 1949 Ecuadorian drama film directed by Paco Villar. The film was the first sound film made in Ecuador, which had a very small film industry at the time. The film was a commercial success on its release. The title refers to Guayaquil, the country's largest city. The production company followed it up with another sound film Dawn in Pichincha in 1950.

== Partial cast ==
- Antonio Arboleda
- Anita Burgos
- Paco Villar
- Olga Eljuri de Villar
- Fernad Nunez

== Bibliography ==
- Handelsman, Michael. Culture and Customs of Ecuador. Greenwood Publishing Group, 2000.
- Rist, Peter H. Historical Dictionary of South American Cinema. Rowman & Littlefield, 2014.
