= Dawn in Pichincha =

1950 film

- Directed by: Alberto Santana
- Written by: Alberto Santana
- Production company: Ecuador Sono Films
- Release date: 1950
- Country: Ecuador
- Languages: Silent; Spanish intertitles

Dawn in Pichincha (Spanish:Amanecer en el Pichincha) is a 1950 Ecuadorian drama film directed by Alberto Santana and starring Paul Feret, Martha Jácome and Salomón Rosero. It was the second sound film to be made in Ecuador following They Met in Guayaquil which was released the previous year.

== Cast ==
- Paul Feret
- Martha Jácome
- Salomón Rosero

== Bibliography ==
- Handelsman, Michael. Culture and Customs of Ecuador. Greenwood Publishing Group, 2000.
