= Entre Marx y una Mujer Desnuda =

1976 Ecuadorian novel by Jorge Enrique Adoum

First edition (publ. Siglo XXI)

Entre Marx y una Mujer Desnuda (Between Marx and a Naked Woman) is a 1976 novel written by the Ecuadorian poet Jorge Enrique Adoum. The novel is described as Adoum's most famous work, and covers his usual themes. According to his entry in the Historical Dictionary of Latin American Literature and Theater, it is "considered one of the most remarkable examples of the new novel in Latin America."

== Film ==
The novel was made into a film in 1996 by the Ecuadorian film maker Camilo Luzuriaga, in Spanish with English and French subtitles. The film won Best Art Direction at the XVIII La Habana Film Festival, Best Script and Best Sound Track at the Trieste Film Festival, and was Nominated for Best Foreign Film by the Spanish Film Academy of Arts and Sciences] 1997. Michael Wilmington of the Chicago Tribune called the film "One of the fest's major surprises is this startlingly inventive and sophisticated, beautifully done film from tiny Ecuador... packed with wit, energy, passion, intelligence, high style and memorable characters... the movie is wildly creative and funny."

The DVD format of this film was released by Pygmalion Media LLC.
