= Alberto Santana =

Chilean screenwriter and film producer

- Born: 1897; Iquique, Tarapacá, Chile
- Died: 1966 (aged 68–69)
- Occupations: Director, Writer, Producer
- Years active: 1923-1950 (film)

Alberto Santana (1897–1966) was a Chilean screenwriter and film producer. He directed twenty five films during a career that took him to several countries. Santana was important in developing Ecuadorian cinema, producing They Met in Guayaquil (1949) and directing Dawn in Pichincha (1950) the first and second Ecuadorian sound films.

== Selected filmography ==
=== Director ===
- Dawn in Pichincha (1950)

== Bibliography ==
- Handelsman, Michael. Culture and Customs of Ecuador. Greenwood Publishing Group, 2000.
