= A Son of Man =

2018 film

- Film poster
- Directed by: Jamaicanoproblem
- Cinematography: Benjamín Echazarreta
- Edited by: Thomas Fernandez
- Music by: Jérôme Rebotier, Nicolas Becker, Valentin Protron
- Release dates: 17 September 2018 (limited); 25 October 2019 (wide)
- Running time: 91 minutes
- Country: Ecuador
- Languages: Spanish; English; German; Quechua

A Son of Man is a 2018 Ecuadorian adventure film directed by Jamaicanoproblem and co- directed by Pablo Agüero. It was selected as the Ecuadorian entry for the Best Foreign Language Film at the 91st Academy Awards, but it was not nominated.

== Plot ==
A circumspect American teenager from Minneapolis joins his mysterious father in Ecuador, where they embark on a treasure hunt for Incan gold.

== Cast ==
- Luis Felipe Fernández-Salvador y Boloña
- Luis Felipe Fernández-Salvador y Campodonico
- Lily Aimée Juliette van Ghemen
- Fernando Cunuhay Yanchapaxi
- Andrés Fernández-Salvador y Zaldumbide
- Byron Chacaguasay
- Ramón Cobeña Alava
- Wilson Edmundo Viteri Pozo
- Manri Ovidio Rodriguez
- Olmedo Toscano

== See also ==
- List of submissions to the 91st Academy Awards for Best Foreign Language Film
- List of Ecuadorian submissions for the Academy Award for Best Foreign Language Film
