= Chuzalongo =

- Ecuadorian theatrical release poster
- Directed by: Diego Ortuño
- Written by: Diego Ortuño
- Produced by: Georgina Altarriba Eloi Aymerich; Dorian Fernández-Moris; Christian Mejia-Acosta; Joan Salicrú Nevenka Yanovich
- Starring: Bruno Odar; Wolframio Sinué; Aléx Cisneros
- Cinematography: Tupac Galarza
- Edited by: Amaia Merino
- Music by: Gerard Alís Raurich; Agni Durden; Emil Plonski
- Production companies: Audiovisual Films; Clack Audiovisual; Dominio Digital; Retrogusto Films
- Release dates: April 11, 2024 (Fantaspoa); October 31, 2024 (Ecuador); November 6, 2025 (Peru)
- Running time: 95 minutes
- Countries: Ecuador; Canada; Peru; Spain
- Languages: Spanish; Kichwa
- Budget: $360.000

Chuzalongo is a 2024 folk horror film written and directed by Diego Ortuño, based on the traditional Andean legend "El Chuzalongo", which is represented as a child-elf who sexually assaults women. It stars Bruno Odar, Wolframio Sinué and Aléx Cisneros accompanied by Fernando Bacilio, Mónica Mancero, Toa Tituaña, Yuyak Guitarra, Lenin Farinango and Sisa Farez.

It was selected as the Ecuadorian entry for the Best International Feature Film at the 98th Academy Awards, but it was not nominated.

== Synopsis ==
Women are being murdered by a mysterious creature known as the Chuzalongo. Father Nicanor will investigate the deaths surrounding the legend while the revolution and the enslavement experienced by those called Indians increasingly complicate his work, and the desperation of the community members seeks to stem the number of deaths and disappearances.

== Cast ==
- Bruno Odar as Nicanor
- Wolframio Sinué as Melalo
- Aléx Cisneros as Don Alfonso
- Fernando Bacilio as Segundo
- Mónica Mancero as Lucía
- Toa Tituaña as Rosa
- Yuyak Guitarra as Awki
- Karla Gómez as Magdalena
- Lenin Farinango as Narrator
- Matilde Lagos as Mamita Juana
- Gael Ortuño as Kid
- Sisa Farez

== Production ==
The script took 5 years to write. Principal photography began on May 1, 2023, in Quito, Cayambe, Cotacachi and Pintag, Ecuador, lasting 4 weeks.

== Release ==
Chuzalongo had its world premiere on April 11, 2024, at the 20th Fantaspoa (Porto Alegre International Fantastic Film Festival), and then screened on September 25, 2024, at the 10th Guayaquil International Film Festival.

The film was released commercially on October 31, 2024, in Ecuadorian theaters, and on November 6, 2025, in Peruvian theaters under the title "En el nombre del mal" (lit. 'In the Name of Evil').

== Box office ==
It sold more than 20,000 tickets during its eight-week run, becoming the highest-grossing Ecuadorian film of the year.

== See also ==
- List of submissions to the 98th Academy Awards for Best International Feature Film
- List of Ecuadorian submissions for the Academy Award for Best International Feature Film
