= Somos ecos =

- Theatrical release poster
- Directed by: Julián Díaz Velosa
- Written by: Julián Díaz Velosa
- Produced by: Julián Díaz Velosa; Emanuele Moretti; Diana Lorena Ojeda Cadena; Tyler Rousseau; Mateo Vergara
- Starring: Sebastián Velásquez; Felipe Villamil; Maria Luisa López
- Cinematography: Manuel Velásquez
- Edited by: Alejo Alas; Etienne Boussac
- Music by: Enrico Fabio Cortese
- Production companies: Cova Pictures; Motus Studios; Timeless Colombia
- Release dates: October 2021 (San Diego); August 17, 2023 (Colombia)
- Running time: 83 minutes
- Countries: Colombia; United States; Italy
- Language: Spanish

Somos ecos (lit. 'We are echoes') is a 2021 war drama film written, directed and co-produced by Julián Díaz Velosa in his directorial debut. It is about 3 young people: a reluctant punker, an infiltrated guerrilla and a peasant who are forcibly recruited to fight in an armed conflict. Starring Sebastián Velásquez, Felipe Villamil and Maria Luisa López. It is a co-production between Colombia, the United States and Italy.

== Synopsis ==
Three young people are taken away from their dreams, to be taken to the ranks of different sides of a conflict to which they do not want to belong. They are victims, but now they will be affected and prepared for war, while they fight internally to avoid becoming the next victimizers.

== Cast ==
- Sebastián Velásquez as Sebastián Ramirez
- Felipe Villamil as Alias Andres
- Maria Luisa López as Sandra
- Liliana Calderón as Gloria
- Juan Sebastián Casanova as Urban Guerrilla
- Felipe Correa as Elias Elkin
- Sharon Guzman as Susana
- Mario Jurado as Don Ernesto
- Lise Lenne as Marin
- Howard Martínez as Guaya
- Jhoan Moreno as Cabo Díaz
- Mauricio Salas as Senator Porras
- David Velázquez as Lieutenant Morales

== Production ==
Principal photography began took place between Bogotá and Puerto Boyacá, Colombia.

== Release ==
Somos ecos had its world premiere in mid-October 2021 at the 20th San Diego International Film Festival. It was commercially released on August 17, 2023, in Colombian theaters.

== Accolades ==
Year	Award / Festival	Category	Recipient	Result	Ref.
2021	San Diego Internacional Film Festival	Best International Feature	Somos ecos	Nominated	
2021	San Diego Internacional Film Festival	Audience Choice Feature	Somos ecos	Won	
2022	Indian World Film Festival	Best Cinematography	Manuel Velásquez	Won	
2022	Bogotá Film Festival	Best Colombian Film	Somos ecos	Won	
2022	Bogotá Film Festival	Best International Film	Somos ecos	Won	
2022	Bogotá Film Festival	Best Director	Julián Díaz Velosa	Won	
2023	Pasto International Film Festival	Best Colombian Fiction Direction	Julián Díaz Velosa	Won	
