= Behind You =

2011 film

- Film poster
- Directed by: Tito Jara
- Written by: Tito Jara
- Starring: Lily Alejandra
- Cinematography: Alvaro Duran
- Release date: 1 April 2011
- Running time: 76 minutes
- Country: Ecuador
- Language: Spanish

Behind You (Spanish: A tus espaldas) is a 2011 Ecuadorian drama film written and directed by Tito Jara.

== Cast ==
- Lily Alejandra as Yahaira
- Nicolás Hogan as Luis Alberto Granada de la Roca
- Jenny Nava as Greta
- Gabino Torres as Jorge Chicaiza Cisneros
