= Pablo Agüero =

Argentine-French filmmaker (born 1977)

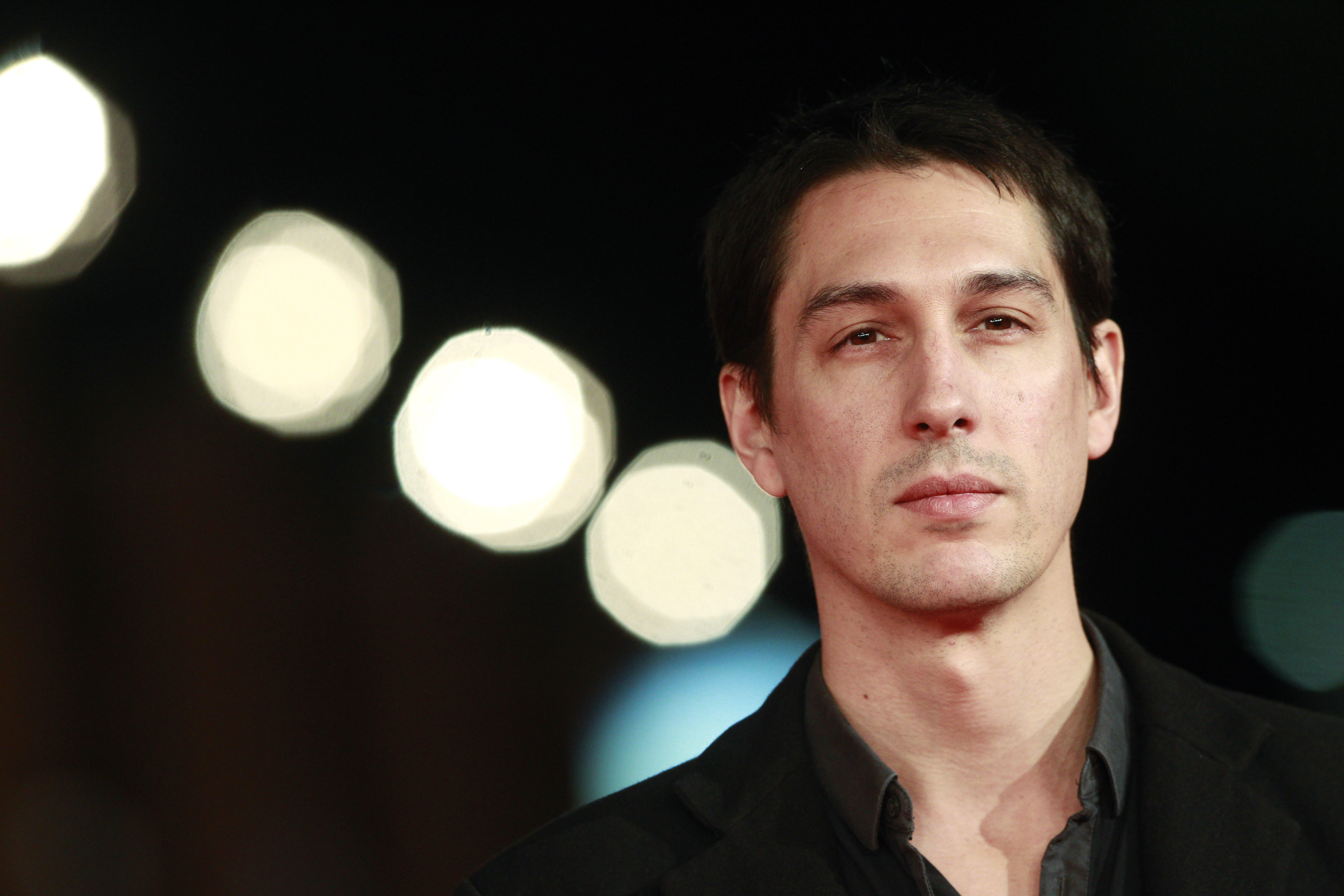
- Pablo Agüero at the San Sebastián International Film Festival (2015)
- Born: May 13, 1977 (age 47); Mendoza, Argentina
- Occupation(s): Film director, screenwriter
- Years active: 2005-present

Pablo Agüero (born 13 May 1977 in Mendoza, Argentina) is an Argentine-French filmmaker and screenwriter. He obtained international recognition with Primera Nieve, winner of the Jury Prize for Short Films at the 2006 Cannes Festival.

Born and raised in Patagonia, Agüero made his first film, Mas allá de las puertas at age 15, and won the main prize at the Patagonian Biennale of Art.

Some of the actors who participated in his films are John Cale (Velvet Underground), who acted for the first time in the cinema in "Salamandra". Gael García Bernal (Amores perros, La mala Educación), Denis Lavant (Mister Lonely, Holy Motors) and Imanol Arias (La Flor de mi Secreto) were gathered for the first time in "Eva no duerme". Jeanne Moreau performed a radio adaptation of "Eva no Duerme" and an original song together with Gotan Project. It was the last performance of her life. Géraldine Chaplin plays "God" in "Madres de los Dioses". Louis Garrel, Vincent Cassel and Diane Kruger star in his last film, Saint-Ex.

== Filmography ==
- Lejos del Sol (short, 2005)
- Primera Nieve (short, 2006)
- Salamandra (2008)
- 77 Doronship (2009)
- Madres de los Dioses (2015)
- Eva Doesn't Sleep (2015)
- A Son of Man (2018)
- Coven (2020)
- Saint-Exupéry (2024)

== Awards and nominations ==
=== Wins ===
- 2005 Best Short Film Award for Lejos del Sol at the Buenos Aires International Festival of Independent Cinema
- 2005 Best Short Film Award for Lejos del Sol at the Cork International Film Festival
- 2006 Jury Prize (Cannes Film Festival) for Primera Nieve
- 2006 First Prize at the Gijón International Film Festival for Primera Nieve
- 2006 Best Opera Prima for Primera Nieve by the National Institute of Cinema and Audiovisual Arts
- 2009 Best Director for 77 Doronship at the Buenos Aires International Festival of Independent Cinema
- 2012 Grand Prix for the Best Scriptwriter at SOPADIN, France, for Eva No Duerme.
- 2015 Ecumenical Award at Visions du Réel for Madre de los Dioses.
- 2015 Best Director for Eva Doesn't Sleep at Amiens International Film Festival
- 2015 Best Argentinian Movie of the Year at Pantalla Pinamar for Eva Doesn't Sleep
- 2015 Silvestre First Prize at the IndieLisboa International Independent Film Festival for Eva Doesn't Sleep
- 2015 Cine en Construcción Award at the Toulouse Latin American Film Festival for Eva Doesn't Sleep
- 2015 Ciné-plus Award at the Toulouse Latin American Film Festival for Eva Doesn't Sleep
- 2016 Silver Condor Award for Best Director for Eva Doesn't Sleep
- 2016 Best Cinematography at the Argentine Film Critics Association for Eva Doesn't Sleep
- 2016 Best Art Direction at the Argentine Film Critics Association for Eva Doesn't Sleep
- 2016 Best Costume Design at the Argentine Film Critics Association for Eva Doesn't Sleep
- 2016 Best Sound at the Argentine Film Critics Association for Eva Doesn't Sleep
- 2019 Best Feature at the Rhode Island International Film Festival for A Son of Man
- 2019 ARTE Award at the San Sebastián International Film Festival for Akelarre

=== Nominations ===
- 2006 Short Film Palme d'Or (Cannes Film Festival) for Primera Nieve
- 2006 Cinéfondation Residence for Salamandra
- 2006 Cinéfondation Atelier for Salamandra
- 2006 Caméra d'Or for Salamandra
- 2006 Directors' Fortnight for Salamandra
- 2015 Golden Shell for Eva Doesn't Sleep
- 2016 11 Argentine Film Critics Association Nominations for Eva Doesn't Sleep
- 2019 Ecuador's selection for the Academy Awards: A Son of Man
- 2020 Directors' Fortnight for Akelarre
- 2020 Golden Shell for Akelarre
- 2021 6 Premios Feroz Nominations for Akelarre
- 2021 Best Film at the Forqué Awards for Akelarre
