= In the Name of the Girl =

2011 film

- Directed by: Tania Hermida
- Written by: Tania Hermida
- Produced by: Tania Hermida
- Starring: Eva Mayu Mecham Benavides
- Cinematography: Armando Salazar
- Music by: Nelson García
- Release date: 7 November 2011 (Rome)
- Running time: 100 minutes
- Country: Ecuador
- Language: Spanish

In the Name of the Girl (Spanish: En el Nombre de la Hija) is a 2011 Ecuadorian drama film written and directed by Tania Hermida.

The film is a religious and social criticism of Ecuadorian Christianity and capitalism from the point of view of Manuela, a girl who was raised with revolutionary ideas, without religious ties and with a deep sense of social equality.

== Plot ==
A nine-year-old girl's name is in dispute. Manuela is named after her father, a socialist and atheist; but her grandmother, Catholic and conservative, insists on giving her the name that all the first-born of the family have carried for generations: Dolores. The story takes place in a valley in the Ecuadorian Andes, in the summer of 1976. Manuela and her younger brother, Camilo, remain in the care of their grandparents at the family's farm house, where they share the holidays with the cousins. Manuela is a girl who was raised with revolutionary ideas, without religious ties and with a deep sense of social equality. There Manuela is frustrated and lost before the great ideological differences, which make her collide with her grandparents, uncles and cousins.

It will be his meeting with the crazy uncle, hidden in the library of the hacienda house (where he has dedicated himself to freeing words), that awakens his need to go through mirrors, forever transforming his relationship with language and names.

== Cast ==
- Eva Mayu Mecham Benavides as Manuela
- Markus Mecham Benavides as Camilo
- Martina León as María Paz
- Sebastián Hormachea as Andrés
- Francisco Jaramillo as Emilio
- Paul Curillo as Pepe
- Dianneris Díaz as Juanita
- Pancho Aguirre as Uncle Felipe
- Juana Estrella as Grandma Lola
- Felipe Vega de la Cuadra as Grandpa Emilio
