= Behind the Mist =

- Theatrical release poster
- Directed by: Sebastián Cordero
- Written by: Sebastián Cordero; José Cardoso
- Produced by: Sebastián Cordero; José Cardoso
- Cinematography: Mauro Veloso
- Edited by: José Cardoso
- Music by: Boris Vian
- Production companies: Jiráfica Fábrica de Cuentos; Números Primos; Antena Uno Radiovideo
- Release dates: October 6, 2023 (EDOC); January 25, 2024 (Ecuador)
- Running time: 80 minutes
- Country: Ecuador
- Languages: Spanish; English; Nepali

Behind the Mist (Spanish: Al otro lado de la niebla, lit. 'On the other side of the mist') is a 2023 Ecuadorian 3D documentary film co-written, co-produced and directed by Sebastián Cordero. It is about the conversations and experiences between Cordero and Iván Vallejo on their trip to Nepal with the aim of summiting Mount Everest.

Behind the Mist won the Audience Award and Best Sound at the Kunturñawi Ecuadorian Film Festival, received a nomination for Best Ibero-American Film at the 23rd Grande Prêmio do Cinema Brasileiro, Best Ibero-American Film at the 66th Ariel Awards and Best Ibero-American Picture at the 12th Macondo Awards. The film was selected as the Ecuadorian entry for the Best International Feature Film at the 97th Academy Awards.

== Synopsis ==
More than 20 years after Iván Vallejo crowned Mount Everest in 1999 and became the first Ecuadorian to reach the top of the mountain, he decided to make a commemorative film in his honor, inviting Sebastián Cordero. Both will embark on a trip to Nepal to climb again and, in the midst of their odyssey, debates and philosophical and existential conversations will break out in them as they face the dangers of being a mountaineer.

== Release ==
It had its world premiere on October 6, 2023, at the 22nd International Documentary Film Festival Encounters of Other Cinema, then screened on December 3, 2023, at the Festival Ecuador Cine Aventura. It was commercially released on January 25, 2024, in Ecuadorian theaters.

== Accolades ==
| Year | Award / Festival | Category | Recipient | Result | Ref. |
|---|---|---|---|---|---|
| 2023 | Kunturñawi Ecuadorian Film Festival | Audience Award | Behind the Mist | Won | |
| 2023 | Kunturñawi Ecuadorian Film Festival | Best Sound | Behind the Mist | Won | |
| 2024 | 23rd Grande Prêmio do Cinema Brasileiro | Best Ibero-American Film | Behind the Mist | Nominated | |
| 2024 | 66th Ariel Awards | Best Ibero-American Film | Behind the Mist | Nominated | |
| 2024 | 12th Macondo Awards | Best Ibero-American Picture | Behind the Mist | Nominated | |

== See also ==
- List of submissions to the 97th Academy Awards for Best International Feature Film
- List of Ecuadorian submissions for the Academy Award for Best International Feature Film
