= Cinemateca Nacional del Ecuador =

Film archive in Ecuador

Cinemateca Nacional del Ecuador is a film archive located in Ecuador. It was established in 1981 and the collection comprises 4000 films and 10,000 documents.

== See also ==
- List of film archives
- Cinema of Ecuador
