= Porcelain Horse =

2012 film

- Directed by: Javier Andrade
- Written by: Javier Andrade
- Produced by: Maria Angeles Palacios
- Starring: Victor Arauz
- Cinematography: Chris Teague
- Release date: 13 October 2012 (Warsaw)
- Running time: 100 minutes
- Country: Ecuador
- Language: Spanish

Porcelain Horse (Spanish: Mejor No Hablar (de Ciertas Cosas)) is a 2012 Ecuadorian drama film directed by Javier Andrade and produced by Maria Angeles Palacios. The film was selected as the Ecuadorian entry for the Best Foreign Language Film at the 86th Academy Awards, but it was not nominated.

== Cast ==
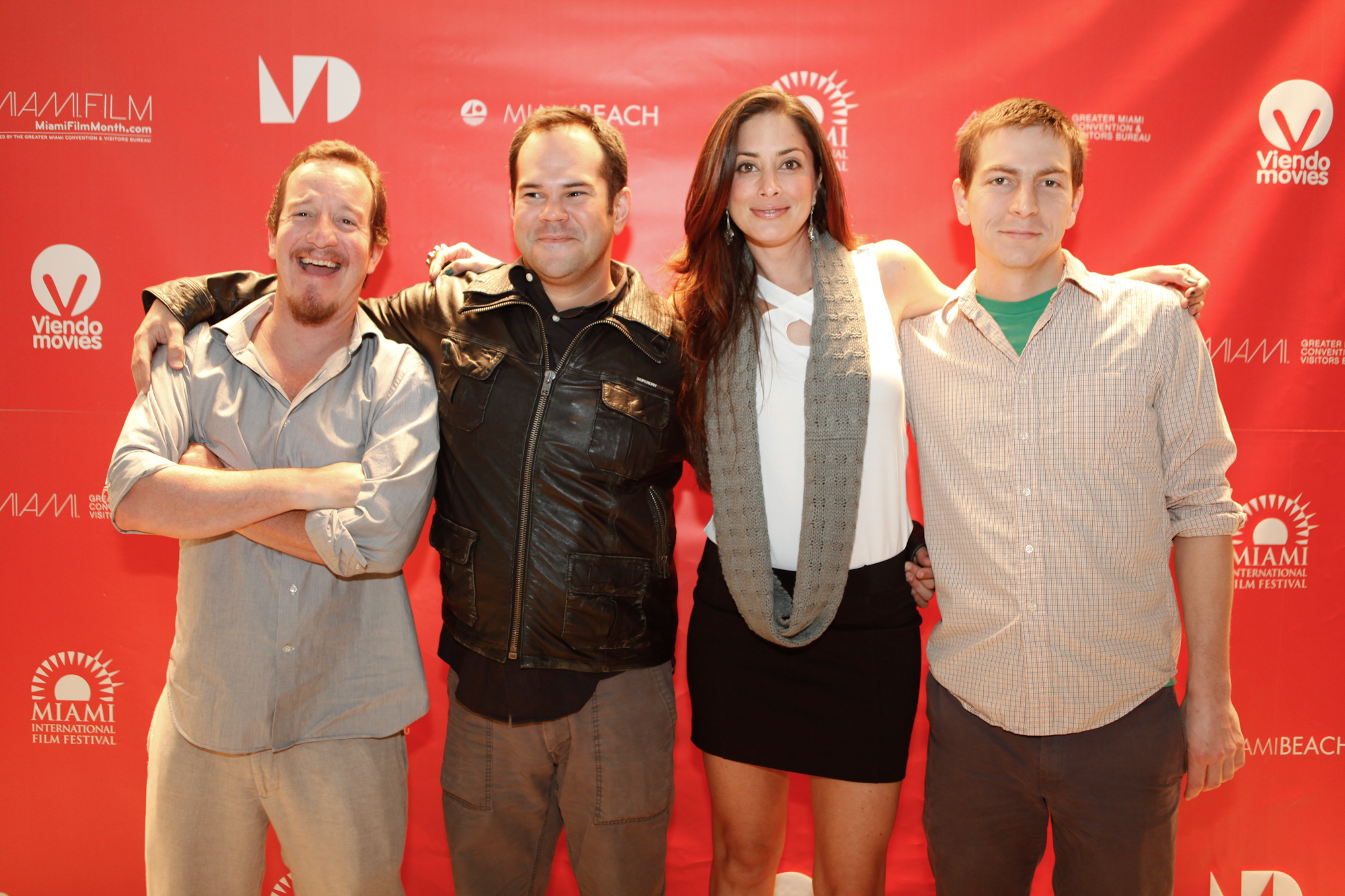
Andrés Crespo, director Javier Andrade, Leovanna Orlandini and DOP Chris Teague at the 2012 Miami International Film Festival presentation of The Porcelain Horse

- Victor Arauz as Luis
- Andrés Crespo as Lagarto
- Alejandro Fajardo as Rodrigo
- Leovanna Orlandini as Lucía
- Francisco Savinovich as Paco

== See also ==
- List of submissions to the 86th Academy Awards for Best Foreign Language Film
- List of Ecuadorian submissions for the Academy Award for Best Foreign Language Film
