= The Ivy (film) =

2025 drama film by Ana Cristina Barragán

- Ecuadorian promotional poster
- Spanish: Hiedra
- Directed by: Ana Cristina Barragán
- Written by: Ana Cristina Barragán
- Produced by: Joseph Houlberg Silva; Alejandro de Icaza; Gabriela Maldonado; Thierry Lenouvel; Montse Pujol Solà; Bernat Manzano Vall; Karla Souza
- Starring: Simone Bucio; Francis Eddú Llumiquinga
- Cinematography: Adrian Durazo
- Edited by: Gerard Borràs; Omar Guzmán; Ana Cristina Barragán
- Music by: Claudia Baulies
- Production companies: Boton Films; BHD Films; Ciné-Sud Promotion; Guspira Films
- Release dates: 3 September 2025 (Venice); 12 March 2026 (Ecuador)
- Running time: 98 minutes
- Countries: Ecuador; Mexico; France; Spain
- Language: Spanish

The Ivy (Spanish: Hiedra) is a 2025 drama film written and directed by Ana Cristina Barragán. A co-production between Ecuador, Mexico, France, and Spain, it stars Simone Bucio and Francis Eddú Llumiquinga.

The film had its world premiere in the Orizzonti section of the 82nd Venice International Film Festival on 3 September 2025, where Barragán won the section's Best Screenplay award. It was theatrically released in Ecuador on 12 March 2026.

It was also selected as the Ecuadorian entry for the Best International Feature Film at the 99th Academy Awards.

== Plot ==
Set in a remote coastal community, the film follows Azucena, a withdrawn young woman who lives in near isolation with her family. When Julio, a boy from the same village, begins to spend time with her, their fragile bond exposes long-suppressed childhood wounds. Through quiet observation and tactile imagery, the story explores themes of intimacy, emotional repression, and the difficulty of breaking inherited cycles of pain.

== Cast ==
- Simone Bucio as Azucena
- Francis Eddú Llumiquinga as Julio

== Production ==
Barragán and producer Karla Souza first worked on the project during a workshop at the ArteCareyes Film Festival. The project was first marketed at the 2021 International Film Festival Rotterdam CineMart. The film was produced by Botón Films, BHD Films, Ciné-Sud Promotion and Guspira Films. The cast mostly consists of non-professional actors.

== Release ==
The film had its world premiere at the 82nd Venice International Film Festival in the Orizzonti sidebar, in which it won the Best Screenplay Award. It was later screened at the 73rd San Sebastián International Film Festival.

The film was released in Ecuadorian theaters on 12 March 2026.

== Reception ==
Cineuropa's film critic Veronica Orciari wrote that "what we get is a very intense story, portrayed by an incredibly well-directed cast, and a strong sense of compositional balance. However, the film never feels fully complete [...] and this sensation may be unsettling for certain audiences". Marc van de Klashorst from International Cinephile Society noted that "what stands out is how tactile Hiedra is, and how well it works as a visceral experience, at least insofar as a social realist drama allows" but complained that "too much time is wasted in the first hour".

== See also ==
- List of submissions to the 99th Academy Awards for Best International Feature Film
- List of Ecuadorian submissions for the Academy Award for Best International Feature Film
