= Qué tan lejos =

- Theatrical release poster
- Directed by: Tania Hermida
- Written by: Tania Hermida
- Produced by: Mary Palacios; Gervasio Iglesias; Tania Hermida
- Starring: Cecilia Vallejo; Tania Martínez; Pancho Aguirre; Fausto Miño
- Cinematography: Armando Salazar
- Edited by: Iván Mora Manzano
- Music by: Nelson García
- Production companies: Corporación Ecuador para Largo; La Zanfoña
- Release dates: September 4, 2006 (Montreal World Film Festival); September 9, 2006 (Ecuador); September 21, 2007 (Spain)
- Running time: 92 minutes
- Countries: Ecuador; Spain
- Language: Spanish
- Budget: $200,000
- Box office: $485,126 (Note: This figure only includes the French, Spanish and Austrian release.)

Qué tan lejos (Note: Literally translated as "How Much Further" or "How Far It Is".) is a 2006 film directed by Ecuadorian filmmaker Tania Hermida. The film is a road movie co-produced by Ecuador and Spain, and it stars Tania Martinez and Cecilia Vallejo as an Ecuadorian student and a Spanish tourist, respectively, who met each other in a bus and take rides together when the roads are blocked because of a strike.

The directorial debut of Hermida, Qué tan lejos was meant to be an ironic reflection about identity and difference. The film satirizes folkloric-like and tourist-like images about Ecuador and Latin American in general. The journey the main characters go through reflect the director's reading of Mexican writer Octavio Paz's book El mono gramático discussion about the search for a meaning. Some commentators noted the protagonist's trip is a self-discovery journey analogous to that of a Bildungsroman.

Hermida had the plot idea in 1997 but only started to produce the film in 2003. Filming was entirely done in Ecuador during 2005, while post-production finished in 2006.

The film internationally premiered at the 2006 Montreal World Film Festival, where it won a Silver Zenith award for directorial debut film. Following that, it was released nationwide in Ecuador in September 2006. The film was a box office hit; it played for six months in theaters and attracted 220,000 viewers in Ecuador. This figure made the film the second most seen film in the history of the country. Following a tour across other major film festivals in São Paulo International Film Festival, Havana Film Festival, Guadalajara, and Moscow, Qué tan lejos was also released in Spain, France, Switzerland and Austria.

== Plot ==
The plot follows an Ecuadorian Literature student, Tristeza, from Quito and a Spanish traveler, Esperanza, from Barcelona, as they unexpectedly travel together from Quito to Cuenca. Tristeza wants to stop Daniel, her summer love, from marrying and Esperanza just wants to travel when an Indigenous-led strike makes it impossible to travel by bus. They are then forced to improvise their way to Cuenca, taking rides from unknown people. After a first frustrated attempt, they take a ride from two journalists covering the strike. They are seemingly interested on the women but they abandon Tristeza and Esperanza after reaching the point where the road is blocked because they say they fear being attacked by Indigenous people. With no one at sight, Tristeza and Esperanza continue their way on foot.

Tired and without knowing where to go, Tristeza and Esperanza meet Jesús. He also needs to go to Cuenca because he needs to release the cremated ashes of his grandmother into the Tomebamba River so he accompanies the women. After stopping to eat something in Alausí, they separate themselves as Tristeza gets a ride with a motorbiker to Zhud. Meanwhile, Esperanza and Jesús ride horses to a small village, where they meet Andrés, who gives them a ride. Esperanza and Jesús meet Tristeza again and the three continue on their way along with Andrés. When they stop at a restaurant, Andrés tells he is going to the wedding of a friend known as "Pollo" (Chicken). Andrés description of the man matches Daniel's and Tristeza gets frustrated to know that Daniel is a womanizer who was already engaged when they met each other.

Disillusioned, Tristeza gives up arriving before Daniel's wedding to stop it and instead the three go to a beach, as suggested by Andrés. They met Francisco "Iguana" and have fun at night. However, they sleep at the beach and when they wake up their belongings have almost been dragged by the sea, and Jesús' grandmother ashes have gone into the sea. Jesús, however, keeps carrying the pot and puts some sand on it. The three take a bus to Cuenca; they sleep on it and when the women wake up Jesús is already gone, but has left the pot behind. Tristeza and Esperanza go to Daniel's wedding but they only observe from distance. Daniel sees Tristeza and does nothing so the women go away and get drunk, as Tristeza reveals her name to be Teresa. Finally, they release the content from the pot over the Tomebamba River.

== Cast ==
- Cecilia Vallejo as Tristeza / Teresa
- Tania Martinez as Esperanza
- Pancho Aguirre as Jesus
- Fausto Miño as Andrés
- Elena Torres as Shopkeeper in Alausí

== Production ==
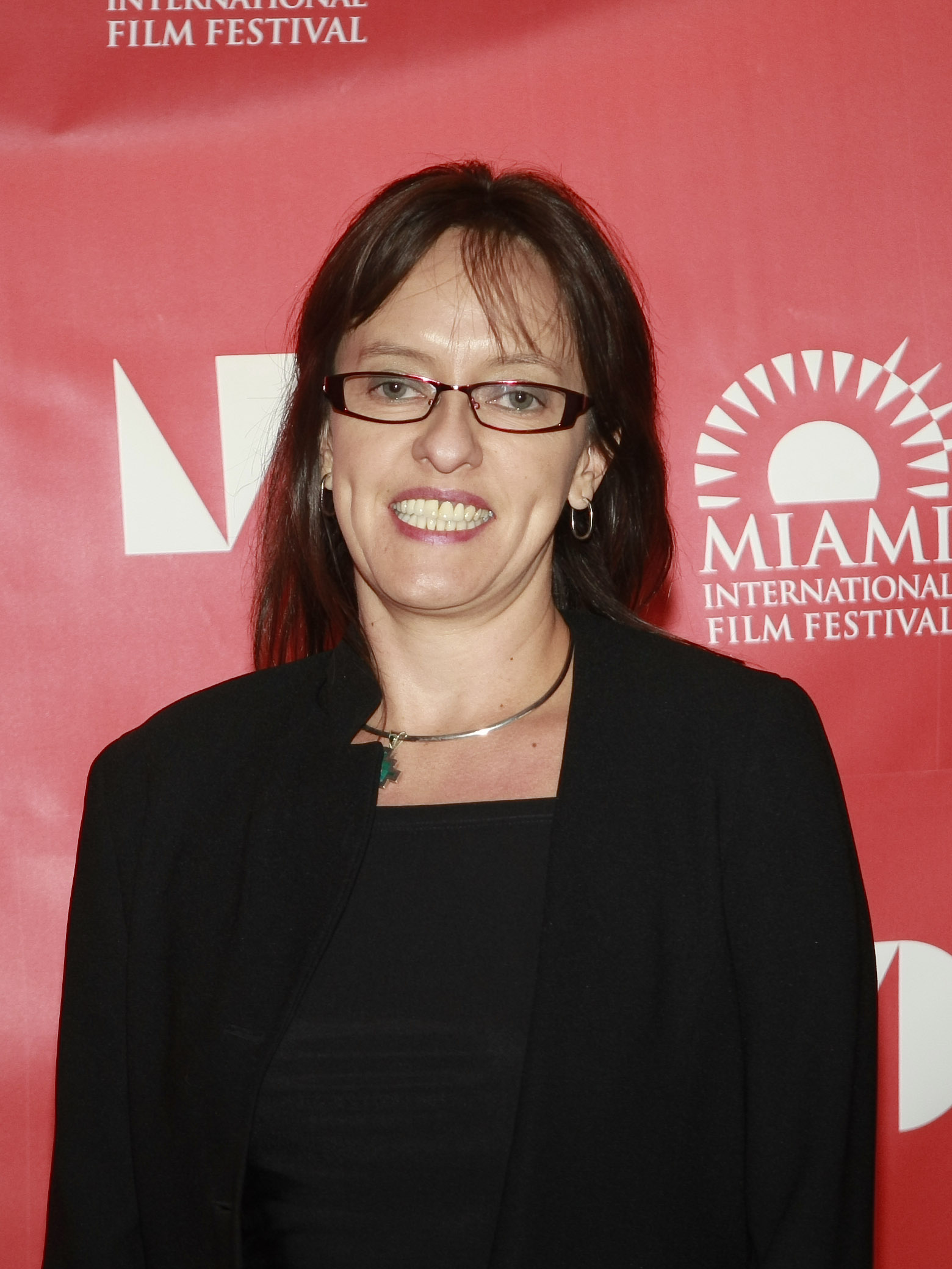
Qué tan lejos was the directorial debut film of Tania Hermida (pictured)

The film is the first feature directed by Tania Hermida, who had worked as an assistant director for Proof of Life, Maria Full of Grace and Crónicas; the idea of Qué tan lejos came during a stay in Madrid in 1997. The project for the film, however, only started in 2003, and had trouble to find fundraisers. The film had a budget of about 200,000 dollars and was produced by a 30-people staff. It was a co-produced by Corporación Ecuador para Largo and Spanish company La Zanfoña; the Ecuadorian company was responsible for 75% of the film, while La Zanfonã worked in the remaining 25%. Filming took five weeks in the second half of 2005 (Note: According to the Ministry of Culture and Sport of Spain, it was shot between November 4, 2005, and December 7, 2005; Ecuadorian newspapers El Diario and El Universo reported it finished filming on July 26, 2005.) and was entirely done in Ecuador across eight different provinces: Azuay, Cañar, Chimborazo, Cotopaxi, Guayas, Manabí, Pichincha, and Tungurahua. Its post-production was finished by April 2006. The film's cast was composed by 20 Ecuadorian actors and one Spanish actress. It was also the first time protagonist Cecilia Vallejo acted on a feature film.

== Themes ==
Hermida described the film as "an ironic reflection about how we construct our identities from the differences with the 'other'", and "how useless our certainties can be when confronted with the different". The director commented the film allowed several interpretations from the viewers, including what Hermida described as "how beautiful is Ecuador". However, ultimately, she declared that it "is about the impossibility of having an identity", and was done to show that "a landscape is not a country" and how the touristic image of the country is "nonsense". (Note: In the original, "la película trata sobre la imposibilidad de tener identidad, de cómo un paisaje no es un país, de la complejidad de encontrar algo más que lo anecdótico del viaje..., del sinsentido de la imagen turística".) The depiction of the landscapes, customs and everything that could seem folkloric-like or tourist-like was meant to be ironic, according to the director. Ecuadorian newspaper La Hora said the film is "full of [...] nuances of irony about ourselves, about how we see ourselves and, through the character of the Spanish girl, about how we are seen from abroad". (Note: In the original, "[...] está lleno de [...] matices de ironía sobre nosotros mismos, sobre como nos vemos y a través del personaje de la chica española, sobre como nos ven de afuera".)

At first, Hermida did not think about the reason Tristeza would travel for. Eventually she came up with the wedding idea but did not plan to give it much importance as it was completely "anedoctal" and just a reason to talk about other things. The film's main theme was taken from a line of Octavio Paz's El mono gramático that Tristeza reads in the first part of the film: "These words that I write are searching for their meaning, and that it is all their meaning consists of". (Note: In the original, "Estas palabras que escribo andan en busca de su sentido, y en eso consiste todo su sentido".) As such, the film seems to end without a meaning but the meaning itself is the absence of a meaning. "A travel has no end", said Hermida; "it is cyclic, it ends where it started". (Note: In the original, "el viaje no tiene un final. Es cíclico, termina donde empezó.") Ecuadorian newspaper El Telégrafo seconded it, saying "The language through which [the film] speaks to us is an—endless—search for meaning." (Note: In the original, "El lenguaje en que nos habla es una búsqueda —interminable— de sentidos".) The journey of search for a meaning was described by some commentators to be similar to that of a Bildungsroman.

Hermida also thought about her film as a "reflection on language and the impossibility of naming reality without transforming it". While an interviewer suggested Teresa's change of name exemplified it, Hermida added that the process of being a subject is an example since "everything is always in transformation: names, countries, identities, stories change depending on who tells them." (Note: In the original, Hermida: "De algún modo, Qué tan lejos es una reflexión sobre el lenguaje y la imposibilidad de nombrar la realidad sin transformarla"; Interviewer: "Y eso está en el cambio del nombre de Teresa"; Hermida: "Y está en el intento de definirse y colocarse como un sujeto, un intento siempre vano, en el que finalmente todo está siempre en transformación: los nombres, los países, las identidades, las historias cambian dependiendo de quién las cuenta.")

Hermida tried to depict Ecuador "away from Latin American stereotypes of violence and drug trafficking" and instead of it tried to focus on Ecuadorian everyday life. According to La Hora, "Hermida used the everyday to reflect a series of behaviors that identify Ecuadorians" and highlighted how the "anonymous characters" help on it; for example, the presence of "the typical" taxi driver who charges foreigners with an excessive fee or the "vividness" of a girl who sells candy at bus stations.

== Analysis ==
El Telégrafo stated the film reflected a country that had gone through a recent "dollarization", that "survived thanks to the phenomenon of migration" and was politically unstable. (Note: In the original, "La película fue rodada en un Ecuador posdolarización, que sobrevivía gracias al fenómeno de la migración y que era políticamente muy inestable".) Indeed, the film mentions a presidential deposition, which was assumed to be a reference to Lucio Gutiérrez's removal from office. However, the script was already written and the staff was looking for locations in Alausí the day Gutiérrez left his function. It was included by Hermida because then it was a recent fact that both Abdalá Bucaram and Jamil Mahuad had not been able to finish their presidential terms. Another Ecuadorian newspaper, El Diario, also said the film "reflects a devastated, ungovernable country, but not from a tragic point of view, but with a touch of humor". (Note: In the original, "La cinta refleja un país devastado, ingobernable, pero no con una mirada trágica, sino con un toque de humor") Hermida commented that the humor indeed was a constant in the film, saying that what makes it different from other films is the sense of humor with which the situations the characters go through are handled.

A writer for El Diario stated the character of Esperanza depicts and regular tourist "amazed at the third world", while Tristeza, described as "intellectual and somewhat conceited", "reneges her land to the utmost". (Note: In the original, "La española está maravillada con el tercer mundo y la quiteña, de corte intelectual y algo engreída, reniega de su tierra a más no poder".) Screen Anarchy's Peter Martin commented how Teresa's introduction as Tristeza—which translates as "sadness" in English, to contrast to Esperanza's name, which means "hope"—was a demonstration of her "contrary nature in general". This remain true all their travel; while Esperenza is "resolutely positive" and appreciate the surroundings, Tristeza thinks she is "dangerously naive, too much of a tourist" and contradicts her with social or political commentary.

Jesús works as the "wise figure" who provides lessons, according to El Diario, while Andrés embodies an upper-class stereotype. (Note: In the original, "Jesús es la figura sabia, un tipo descomplicado que aporta con viveza, que da lecciones que no saben a sermón. Andrés tiene mucho color, es mi personaje favorito, está muy bien construido y aunque roza el límite entre lo real y lo ridículo de la clase alta de la sierra".) Martin commented that Jesús is more like a narrative device "inserted to provide balance between the two women and deliver nuggets of wisdom".

== Release and reception ==
=== Accolades and public reception ===
Qué tan lejos was not finished yet when it was first shown in October 2005 at the Cero Latitud Film Festival, where it won the Best Work in Progress Award. Its official public release only happened the following year during a preview screening in Cuenca on August 24, 2006. The film was set to premiere in early September but this screening was done because Qué tan lejos entered the Montreal World Film Festival and Hermida wanted it to premiere in her hometown. The film then was then screened in Montreal, where it won a Silver Zenith award for directorial debut film on September 4, 2006. The film has its nationwide release on September 9, 2006; it was a box office hit in the country, premiering in fourteen screening rooms and playing for six months at the movies. The 220,000 viewers made the film the nation's all-time second best local admissions total. (Note: Variety says it had the "nation's all-time best local admissions total" in 2013; however, El Telégrafo reports that, according to a publication by Ecuadorian airline TAME, a 1990 film titled La Tigra had 250,000 viewers.) In several theaters, it had more viewers than the American films, which dominate the Ecuadorian film market. Commenting about it, Hermida said this reflected the fact that "Ecuadorian people wanted to see themselves on the screen". (Note: In the original, "Os números mostraram que os equatorianos querem se ver nas telas dos cinemas".) El Diario labelled it "the Hermida phenomenon".

In October 2006, at the São Paulo International Film Festival, Qué tan lejos was nominated for "New Directors" category, and was among the 14 titles chosen to the Popular Jury Award. The same month it won the Best Film Award, Popular Jury Award, and Best Women's Film at the 2006 Cero Latitud Film Festival. The following month, it was shown at the AFI Fest. The film won the Second Coral Prize for directorial debut film at the Havana Film Festival in December 2006. In 2007, it also entered the Guadalajara International Film Festival competition section for Best Ibero-American Feature in March; the Moscow International Film Festival in June; and won the Jury Award at the São Paulo Latin-American Film Festival in July.

The film was distributed by Karma Films in Spain, where it premiered on September 21, 2007. There it was released in fourteen theaters and grossed $332,098 after eleven weeks. Karma's Paris-based Medula Films acquired the rights for the film in France, where it premiered on May 7, 2008 and grossed $94,592 during seven weeks. The film also had a limited release in Switzerland by Trigon-Film on November 20, 2008. The following month, it was shown at the Film Festival in Latin America in Geneva, where it won the Popular Jury Award; and it also premiered at the Latin American Film Festival in Malaysia at the National Visual Arts Gallery. In July 2009, after the film won the Innsbruck Nature Film Festival Popular Jury Award, it was chosen to play at selected theaters in Austria. It played for five weeks in three movie theaters for a total gross of $29,218. The Austrian, French and Spanish releases combined grossed $485,126.

=== Critical reception ===
El Diario praised the film for "avoid[ing] stereotypes and mak[ing] its plot exceed the predictable". (Note: In the original, "la película salta el estereotipo y hace que su trama supere lo predecible".) The writer commended how the characters create a bond with the audience and especially lauded Fausto Miño's performance as Andrés. While he found the story to be "familiar" and the storytelling "traditional", Peter Martin of American website Screen Anarchy said that what "provides substance are the very engaging performances" of the two main actresses and the way Hermida inserts commentary on Ecuador and its racial and national prejudice. Nuria Vidal of Spanish magazine Fotogramas compared it to Alain Tanner's Messidor and Maria Novaro's Sin dejar huella but said it is better because it avoids being tragic or dramatic. She also praised it for showing that a Latin American film can be good without exploiting misery.

In a retrospective analysis in 2013, the film has been considered of "great quality" and to be part of a revival in Ecuadorian cinema by Fabricio Cevallos, writing for La Hora. María Belén Guerrero of ChildFund recommended it as one of the ten best films of Ecuador by 2013. In 2016, El Telégrafo published an editorial celebrating the tenth anniversary of the film's original release. The newspaper affirmed Qué tan lejos "told us about ourselves, it showed us our [own] places, it put us in front of our [own] people, [and] it made us feel interculturality". (Note: In the original, "[...] nos habló de nosotros, nos enseñó nuestros lugares, nos puso enfrente de nuestra gente, nos hizo palpar la interculturalidad".)
