= Alba (film) =

2016 film

- Film poster
- Directed by: Ana Cristina Barragán
- Written by: Ana Cristina Barragán
- Produced by: Isabela Parra; Ramiro Ruiz
- Starring: Macarena Arias
- Cinematography: Simon Brauer
- Edited by: Yibran Asuad; José María Avilés; Ana Cristina Barragán; Juan Daniel F. Molero
- Production companies: Caleidoscopio Cine; Leyenda Films; Graal Films
- Release dates: 1 February 2016 (IFF Rotterdam); 28 October 2016
- Running time: 98 minutes
- Country: Ecuador
- Language: Spanish

Alba is a 2016 Ecuadorian drama film directed by Ana Cristina Barragán and starring Macarena Arias. It was selected as the Ecuadorian entry for the Best Foreign Language Film at the 90th Academy Awards, but it was not nominated.

== Plot ==
Alba, a painfully shy 11-year-old girl, struggles to fit in while living with her infirm mother and loner father.

== Cast ==
- Macarena Arias as Alba
- Pablo Aguirre Andrade as Igor
- Amaia Merino as Mamá

== See also ==
- List of submissions to the 90th Academy Awards for Best Foreign Language Film
- List of Ecuadorian submissions for the Academy Award for Best Foreign Language Film
