= Tania Hermida =

Ecuadorian movie director and screenwriter

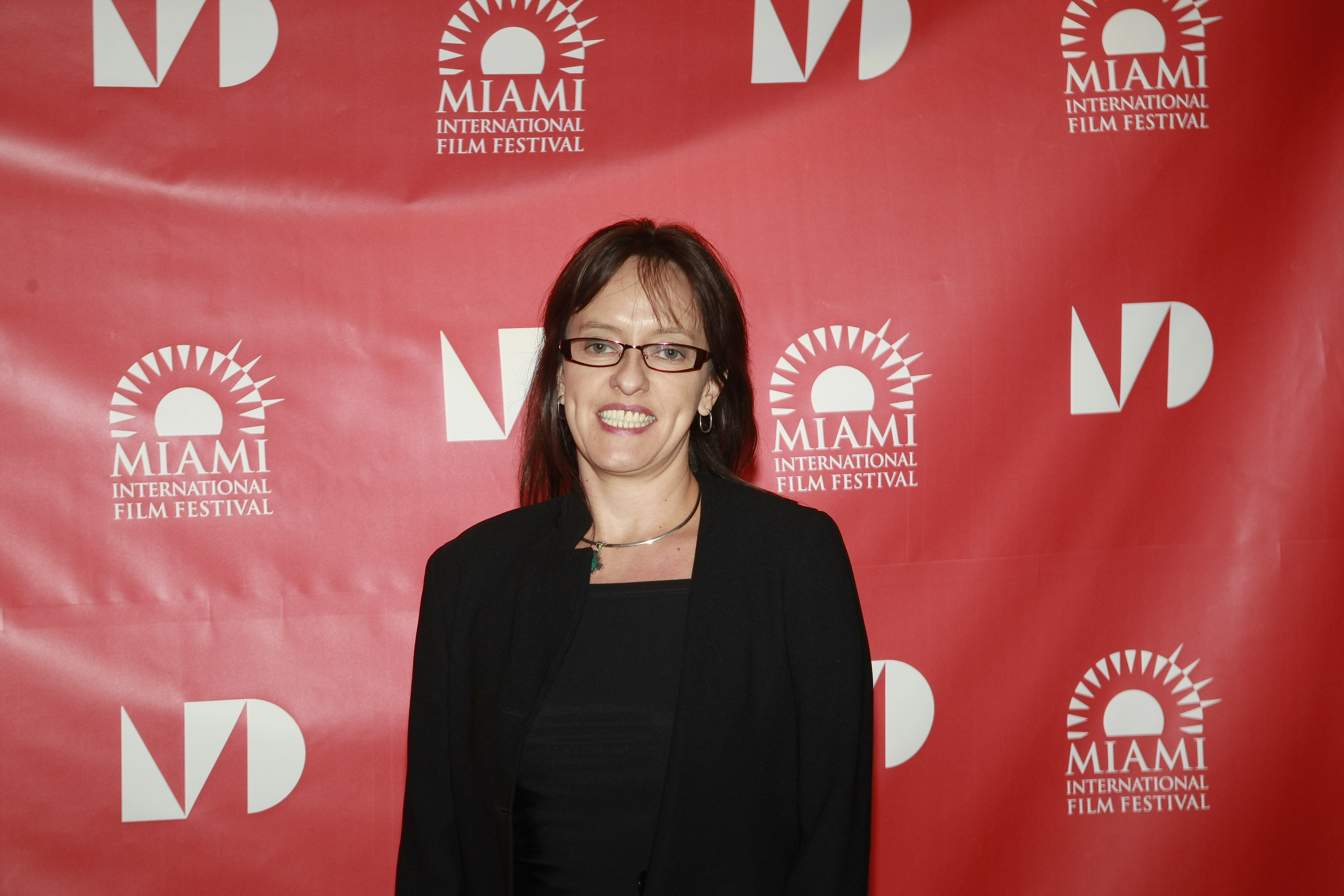
- Tania Hermida in 2012
- Born: 1968 (age 56–57); Cuenca
- Occupation(s): Movie director, screenwriter

Tania Hermida (b. 1968) is an Ecuadorian movie director and screenwriter. She wrote and directed the internationally recognized and lauded films Qué tan lejos and In the Name of the Girl and has collaborated with other filmmakers, like Sebastián Cordero. From 2007 to 2008, she was a member of the Ecuadorian National Assembly.

== Biography ==
Tania Hermida was born in Cuenca, Ecuador in 1968. Her elder sister is the first woman rector of the University of Cuenca María Augusta Hermida.

Her father, a doctor and an avid reader, ensured that Hermida grew up surrounded by art and literature. When she was nine, her family devised a familial newspaper called Horizontes wherein each member of the family wrote a page.

Following after her father, Hermida studied medicine for a single year, but decided that it was not her vocation. At 19, she discovered a scholarship course in film hosted at the International School of Film and TV at San Antonio de los Baños, Cuba, and decided to apply. She won the scholarship and, in 1991, graduated from the school. Though her father had admired the Cuban Revolution and promoted it in the Hermida household and instilled in Tania a respect for Cuba, she became fascinated with the ways that the people of Cuba expressed their dissatisfaction with the Communist government. Her first film, 11 minutes in length, was about a Cuban plastic artist who used his talents to creatively criticize the government.

Hermida completed complementary studies in the aesthetics of cinema at the University of Valladolid in 1990 and creative writing at the School of Letters in Madrid in 1998. In 2003, she completed a master's degree in cultural studies at the University of Azuay.
