= The Other Son (2023 film) =

- Theatrical release poster
- Directed by: Juan Sebastián Quebrada
- Written by: Juan Sebastián Quebrada
- Produced by: Alejandro Ríos Aristizabal; Grégoire Debailly; Nicolás Grosso; Franco Lolli; Álvaro Vásquez
- Starring: Miguel Gonzalez; Simón Trujillo
- Cinematography: Michaël Capron
- Edited by: Pascale Hannoyer; Julie Duclaux
- Music by: Carlos Quebrada
- Production companies: Evidencia Films; Geko Films; Le Tiro; CineVaya Films; RTVCPlay
- Release dates: September 24, 2023 (Zinemaldia); November 2, 2023 (Colombia); November 16, 2023 (Argentina)
- Running time: 89 minutes
- Countries: Colombia; Argentina; France
- Language: Spanish

The Other Son (Spanish: El otro hijo) is a 2023 drama film written and directed by Juan Sebastián Quebrada in his directorial debut. Starring Miguel Gonzalez and Simón Trujillo, it is about a teenager who must overcome the unexpected death of his brother at a party while his family environment collapses. It is a co-production between Colombia, Argentina and France.

The Other Son had its world premiere at the 71st San Sebastián International Film Festival on September 24, 2023, where it competed in the New Directors section. It was selected as the Colombian entry for the Best Ibero-American Film at the 38th Goya Awards.

== Synopsis ==
Federico and his brother Simón fully live their adolescence until the day Simón dies at a party. While his family environment crumbles before his eyes, Federico tries to live his last weeks of school normally. Unable to grieve, he gets closer and closer to Laura, his deceased brother's girlfriend.

== Cast ==
The actors participating in this film are:

- Miguel Gonzalez
- Ilona Almansa
- Jenny Navarrete
- John Hurtafo
- Gabriel Taboada
- Simón Trujillo

== Production ==
Principal photography lasted almost 6 weeks in Bogotá, Colombia.

== Release ==
=== Festival ===
The Other Son had its world premiere on September 24, 2023, at the 71st San Sebastián International Film Festival, then It was screened on September 27, 2023, at the 32nd Biarritz Amérique Latine Festival, on October 6, 2023, at the 9th Bogotá International Film Festival and at the 25th Rio de Janeiro International Film Festival, and on November 9, 2023, at the 38th Mar del Plata International Film Festival.

=== Theatrical ===
It was commercially released on November 2, 2023, in Colombian theaters, then expanded to the Argentine market on November 16, 2023.

== Accolades ==
Year	Award / Festival	Category	Recipient	Result	Ref.
2023	71st San Sebastián International Film Festival	Kutxabank Award - New Directors	The Other Son	Nominated	
2023	18th Rome Film Festival	Best Independent Film	The Other Son	Won	
2023	18th Rome Film Festival	Best Actor - Special Mention	Miguel Gonzalez	Won	
2023	38th Mar del Plata International Film Festival	Best Latin American film	The Other Son	Pending	

== See also ==
- List of Argentine films of 2023
