= Dreams from the Middle of the World =

Dreams from the Middle of the World (Spanish: Sueños en la mitad del mundo) is a 1998 Ecuadorian film directed by Carlos Naranjo Estrella. It was Ecuador's submission to the 73rd Academy Awards for the Academy Award for Best Foreign Language Film, but was not accepted as a nominee.

== See also ==
- List of submissions to the 73rd Academy Awards for Best Foreign Language Film
