= Ana Cristina Barragán =

Ecuadorian filmmaker

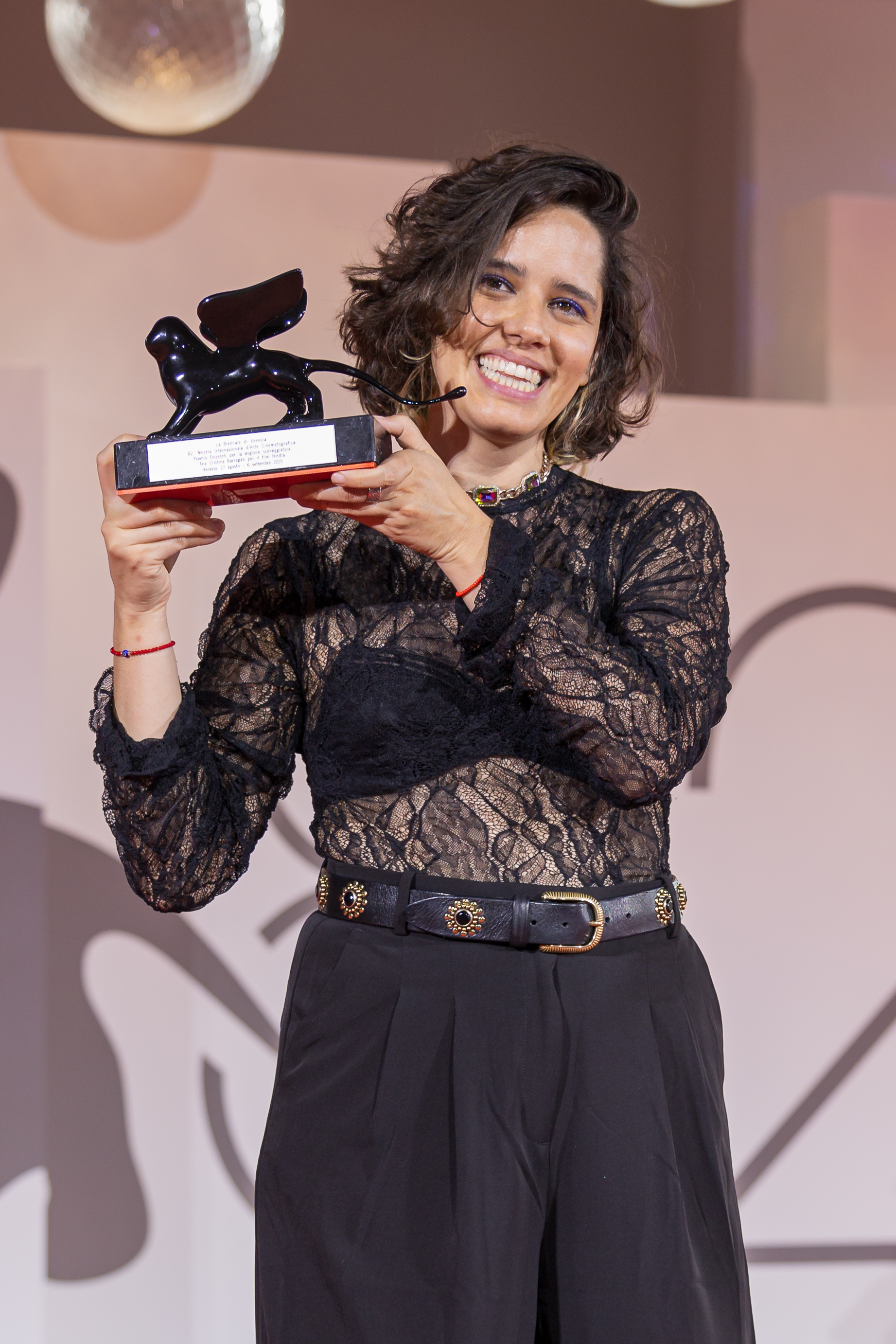
- Born: 1987; Quito
- Alma mater: Universidad San Francisco de Quito
- Occupation: Film director

Ana Cristina Barragán (born 1987) is an Ecuadorian filmmaker.

Ana Cristina Barragán was born on 1987 in Quito. She studied film at the Universidad San Francisco de Quito.

Barragán's feature film debut, Alba (2016), follows a painfully shy 11-year-old girl (Macarena Arias). Alba premiered at the Rotterdam Film Festival and was Ecuador's submission for the Academy Award for Best International Feature Film.

La Piel Pulpo (“Octopus Skin”, 2022) is a coming-of-age drama about twins Iris and Ariel who live on a remote island and grow up in tune with nature. Iris leaves the island to go to a city in search of her estranged father. The film won six awards at Ecuador's 2024 Colibrí Awards.

Her third film The Ivy (Hiedra, 2025) premiered at the Orizzonti section of the 82nd Venice International Film Festival, in which it won the Best Screenplay Award.

== Filmography ==
- Despierta/Awake (2008, short)
- Domingo violeta/Violet Sunday (2010, short),
- Anima/Spirit (2013, short)
- Alba (2016)
- La Piel Pulpo/Octopus Skin (2022)
- Soñé que era Piedra (2022, short)
- Ave/Bird (2023, short)
- The Ivy (2025)
