= Crónicas =

2004 film

- US promotional poster
- Directed by: Sebastián Cordero
- Written by: Sebastián Cordero
- Produced by: Alfonso Cuarón; Guillermo del Toro; Isabel Dávalos; Bertha Navarro; Jorge Vergara
- Starring: John Leguizamo; Leonor Watling; Damián Alcázar; José María Yazpik
- Cinematography: Enrique Chediak
- Edited by: Luis Carballar; Iván Mora Manzano
- Music by: Antonio Pinto
- Distributed by: Palm Pictures
- Release date: May 16, 2004 (Cannes Film Festival)
- Running time: 108 minutes
- Countries: Ecuador; Mexico
- Languages: Spanish; English

Crónicas ("chronicles") is a 2004 Ecuadorian thriller film, written and directed by Sebastián Cordero. The film was produced by, among others, Guillermo del Toro, director of Pan's Labyrinth, and Alfonso Cuarón, director of Children of Men. It was screened in the Un Certain Regard section at the 2004 Cannes Film Festival.

Set in rural Ecuador, the movie follows a television journalist named Manolo Bonilla (played by John Leguizamo) as he investigates the rape and murder of children in the area. The film also stars Leonor Watling and José María Yazpik as Manolo's producer and cameraman, respectively. The film was the official Oscar selection from Ecuador in the Best Foreign Language category.

== Plot ==
After traveling to a small village in Ecuador, Miami tabloid news reporter Manolo Bonilla (Leguizamo) witnesses the death of a local boy after Vinicio Cepeda, a traveling salesman, hits the boy with his pickup truck. When Cepeda attempts to back his truck away from the boy, a mob, led by the boy's father, Don Lucho, pulls him from his car, severely beats him, and sets him on fire before the local authorities intervene. After both men are arrested, Cepeda is examined at the jail infirmary and taken to his cell where, later that night, he is attacked by Don Lucho and severely injured.

The next morning, Manolo Bonilla comes to the prison to interview the men involved. After agreeing to an interview alongside Cepeda, Lucho attacks Cepeda a second time and is taken away. The interview with Cepeda is cancelled due to concerns about Manolo's safety; however, before the reporter leaves, Cepeda notifies him that he has information on the Monster of Babahoyo, a notorious murderer and rapist in the area, and tells him the location where one of the murderer's victims, a nine-year-old girl, is buried. Manolo agrees to interview Cepeda and attempts to free him from prison in exchange for information about the murders. Later that evening, Manolo and his cameraman Ivan drive to the location Cepeda mentioned and dig up a shallow grave, indeed containing the body of a small girl.

Over the following days, Manolo begins interviewing Cepeda, as well as Cepeda's wife, son, and babysitter. While interviewing Cepeda, Manolo begins to suspect that Cepeda is, in fact, the Monster of Babahoyo and using him to exonerate himself. After Manolo attempts to get Cepeda to incriminate himself, Cepeda tells him to leave and never come back. Manolo then informs Cepeda that the interview which would free him will not be aired.

Manolo calls the authorities and tells them that he had been receiving anonymous calls about the location of the girl's grave. He discovers circumstantial evidence placing Cepeda at the locations of the murders on the dates they occurred; however, despite Manolo's request, the news agency airs Cepeda's interviews which help set Cepeda free. After being interviewed by authorities, Manolo and his crew return to Cepeda's home in search of him only to find that he left his pregnant wife alone at their house and took their son to school before leaving the area. Manolo is offered his own show on the news network and, after deciding against turning over the evidence to the police, the team arrives at the airport and parts ways.

== Cast ==
- John Leguizamo as Manolo Bonilla
- Leonor Watling as Marisa Iturralde
- Damián Alcázar as Vinicio Cepeda
- José María Yazpik as Iván Suárez
- Alfred Molina as Victor Hugo Puentes
- Henry Layana as Don Lucho
- Tamara Navas as Doña Etelvina
- Washington Garzón as Joseph Juan
- Rosa Alina Ortiz as Amiga Don Lucho
- Raymundo Zambrano as Cura
- Camilo Luzuriaga as Capitán Bolivar Rojas
- Peki Andino as Sargento Saltos (as Peky Andino)
- Luiggi Pulla as Robert

== Reception ==
On the review aggregator website Rotten Tomatoes, 71% of 72 critics' reviews are positive. The website's consensus reads: "An unsettling and absorbing cautionary tale with John Leguizamo playing an unscrupulous TV reporter who uses the medium to further his own goals." Metacritic, which uses a weighted average, assigned the film a score of 63 out of 100, based on 27 critics, indicating "generally favorable" reviews.

== Awards ==
Crónicas was Ecuador's submission to the 77th Academy Awards for the Academy Award for Best Foreign Language Film, but was not accepted as a nominee.

== See also ==
- List of submissions to the 77th Academy Awards for Best Foreign Language Film
