= Sebastián Cordero =

Ecuadorian film director, screenwriter and editor

Sebastián Cordero Espinosa
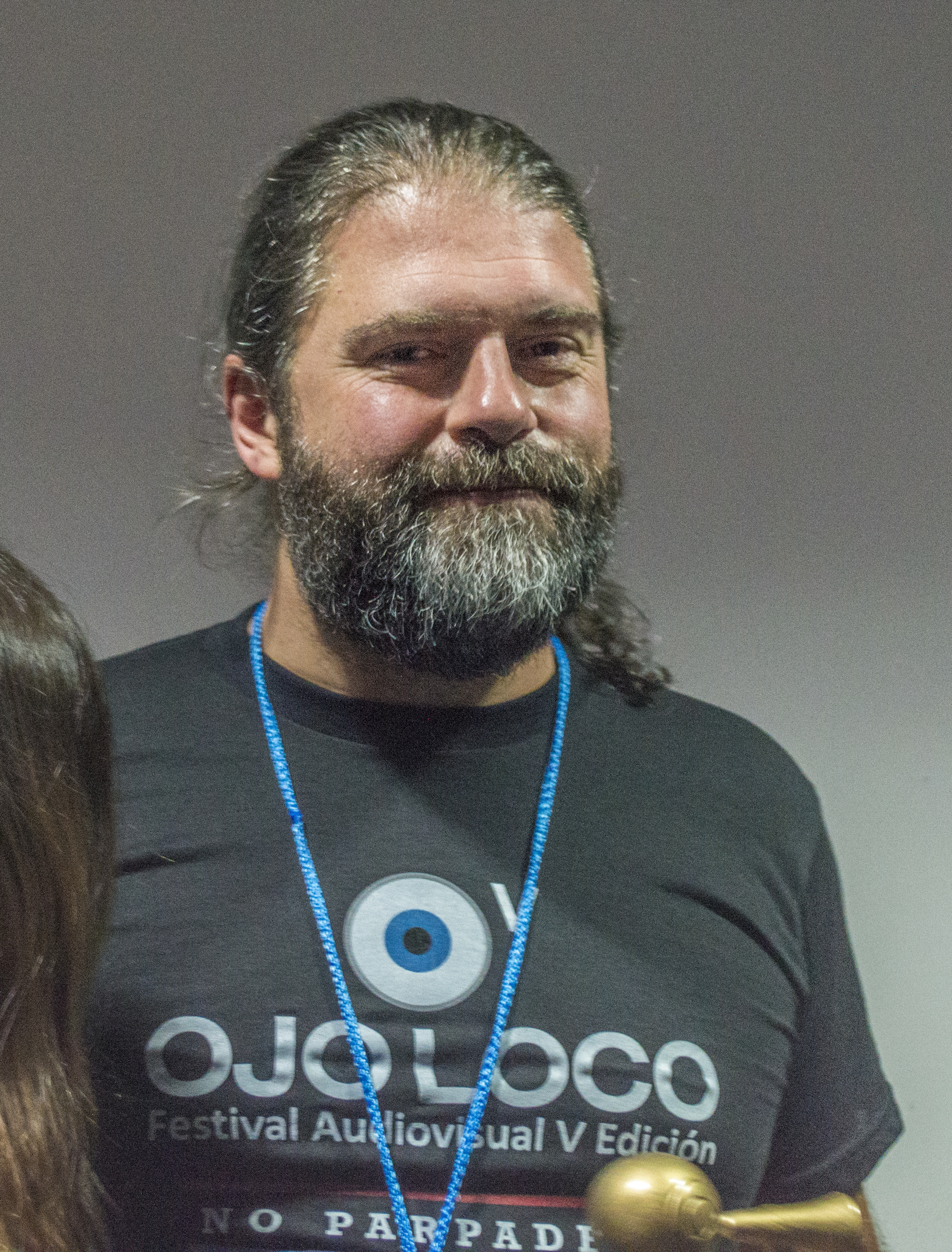
- Sebastián Cordero in 2014.
- Born: Sebastián Cordero Espinosa; 23 May 1972 (age 53); Quito, Ecuador
- Occupations: Film director, screenwriter, editor
- Years active: 1999–present

Sebastián Cordero Espinosa (Spanish pronunciation: [seβasˈtjaŋ koɾˈðeɾo]; born 23 May 1972) is an Ecuadorian film director, screenwriter, and editor, often recognized for his work in Ratas, Ratones, Rateros (1999), Crónicas (2004), and Europa Report (2013). His films have been exhibited in festivals such as the Sundance Film Festival and Cannes Film Festival among others.

== Career ==
He first became interested in filmmaking when he saw Raiders of the Lost Ark at the age of 9. At the age of 18 he began his studies in film and script making in the University of Southern California. After his graduation he moved back to Ecuador with the idea of filmmaking in a country where there was practically no movie industry.

His first movie, Ratas, Ratones, Rateros (1999), which portrays the life in a poverty-stricken Ecuador, led to his first appearance at Venice Film Festival. It later appeared in film festivals such as Toronto, San Sebastián and Buenos Aires, and been recognized with awards and honors at Huelva and La Habana film festivals.

His second film, Crónicas, was recognized with the Sundance/NHK International Filmmakers Award, and first appeared at Cannes in the Un Certain Regard section in 2004, and was nominated to the Grand Jury Prize at Sundance Film Festival. He was attached to direct the motion picture Manhunt that tells the story of what occurred in the lapse of the 48 hours that followed the assassination of Abraham Lincoln and was to star Harrison Ford. The project was later cancelled.

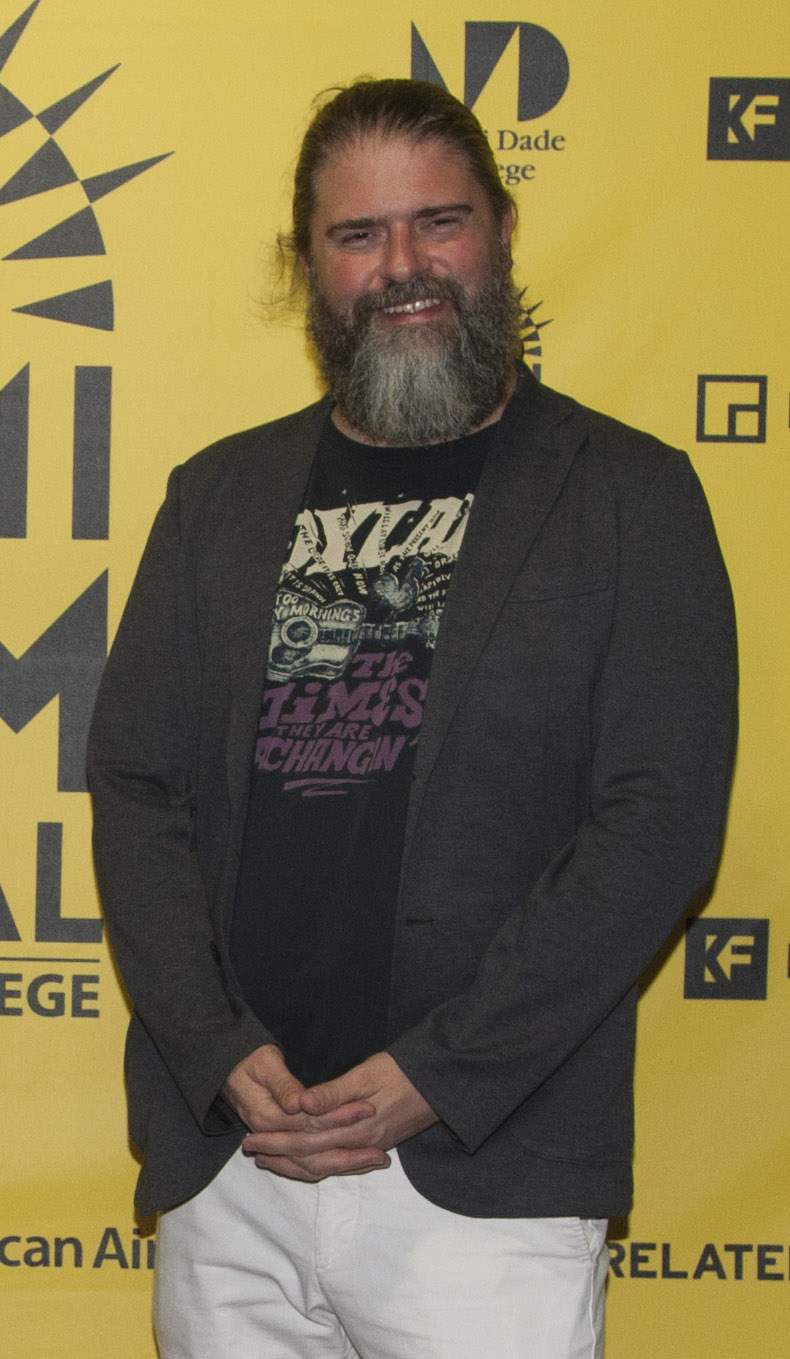
Sebastian Cordero at 2017 Miami International Film Festival showing of Such Is Life in the Tropics

Rabia, his third film, was filmed in Spain. It is based on a novel from the writer Sergio Bizzio. His fourth film Pescador, filmed once again in Ecuador, was released in 2011.

Europa Report was Cordero's first full English language film. The film was shot over the course of 18 days in Brooklyn in 2011. Europa Report was officially launched with a screening at the Hayden Planetarium on August 1, 2013, and was released on demand and in theaters a day later.

He finished development of his sixth film, Such Is Life in the Tropics in 2016.

== Filmography ==
- Ratas, Ratones, Rateros (1999)
- Crónicas (2004)
- Rabia (2009)
- Pescador (2011)
- Europa Report (2013)
- Such Is Life in the Tropics (2016)
- Behind the Mist (2023)
