= Performances of The Vagina Monologues =

The Vagina Monologues is performed annually to bring attention to V-Day in thousands of cities and colleges worldwide. The performances generally benefit rape crisis centers and similar resource centers for women.

The Vagina Monologues were also performed in four Muslim countries deemed to be liberal enough to hold the performances. They were Turkey, Egypt, Indonesia and Pakistan.

== United States ==
Actresses who have performed the play include:

- Alanis Morissette
- Ali Larter
- Alice Ripley
- Amira Eskander
- Amy Irving
- Ana Gasteyer
- Andrea James
- Andrea Martin
- Angelica Torn
- Annabella Sciorra
- Anne E. DeChant
- Annie Potts
- Audra McDonald
- Becky Ann Baker
- Brett Butler
- Brittany Murphy
- Brooke Shields
- Calista Flockhart
- Calpernia Addams
- Carol Kane
- Carolee Carmello
- Cassie Casiano
- Cate Blanchett
- Cindy Williams
- Claire Danes
- Cynthia Garrett
- Cynthia Nixon
- Diahann Carroll
- Diana Alvarez
- Diana Bracho
- Didi Conn
- Donna Loren
- Ella Joyce
- Erica Jong
- Erin Slimak
- Francelle S. Dorn
- Gillian Anderson
- Gina Gershon
- Glenn Close
- Gloria Reuben
- Goldie Hawn
- Hayley Mills
- Hazelle Goodman
- Holland Taylor
- Idina Menzel
- Jane Fonda
- Janelle Buchanan
- Jennifer Beals
- Jennifer Hudson
- Jenifer Lewis
- Jessica Walter
- Joie Lee
- Joy Behar
- Joyce DeWitt
- Judith Ivey
- Judy Gold
- Julia Murney
- Julia Stiles
- Julianna Margulies
- Julie Halston
- Julie Kavner
- Karen Kuykendall
- Kate Winslet
- Katherine Helmond
- Kathleen Chalfant
- Kathy Najimy
- Kellie Martin
- Kim Coles
- Kim Fields
- Kit Williams
- Kristi Lee
- Lainie Kazan
- Laura Kelly
- Lauren Hollis
- Lauren Lane
- Lauren Velez
- Lily Tomlin
- Linda Ellerbee
- Lisa Gay Hamilton
- Lisa Kron
- Lisa Leguillou
- LisaRaye McCoy
- Lois Smith
- Loretta Swit
- Lucy Lawless
- Lynda Carter
- Lynn Whitfield
- Marisa Tomei
- Marla Gibbs
- Marlo Thomas
- Marsha Mason
- Mary Alice
- Mary McDonnell
- Mary Testa
- Megan Goble
- Melanie Brown
- Melanie Griffith
- Melissa Etheridge
- Melissa Joan Hart
- Melody Thomas Scott
- Mercedes Ruehl
- Meryl Streep
- Michele Shay
- Michelle Rodriguez
- Mo Gaffney
- Mo'Nique
- Nell Carter
- Oprah Winfrey
- Pam Tillis
- Patricia Kalember
- Peggy Lipton
- Phylicia Rashad
- Polly Bergen
- Queen Latifah
- Ramona White-Cole
- Regina Taylor
- Ricki Lake
- Rita Moreno
- Robin Givens
- Roma Maffia
- Rosa Blasi
- Rosario Dawson
- Rosie Perez
- Rue McClanahan
- Ruthie Henshall
- Sally Kellerman
- Salma Hayek
- Sanaa Lathan
- Sandra Oh
- Sara Ramirez
- Sena Quist
- Shirley Knight
- Sonia Manzano
- Susan Sarandon
- Susie Essman
- Swoosie Kurtz
- Teri Garr
- Teri Hatcher
- Tiffany Pollard
- Trenyce
- Toccara Jones
- Tonya Pinkins
- Tovah Feldshuh
- Veanne Cox
- Viola Davis
- Wendy Raquel Robinson
- Whoopi Goldberg
- Winona Ryder
- Yvette Wilson

== Canada ==
- Jann Arden
- Thea Andrews
- Melissa Auf der Maur
- Jeanne Beker
- Lauren Collins
- Mackenzie Davis
- Joyce DeWitt
- Shirley Douglas
- Jennifer Hollett
- Sass Jordan
- Chantal Kreviazuk
- Wendy Lands
- Rachel McAdams
- Alanis Morissette
- Ngozi Paul
- Carole Pope
- Gloria Reuben
- Sarika Sehgal
- Mia Sheard
- Tara Slone
- Sonja Smits
- Krista Sutton
- Amanda Tapping
- Mary Walsh
- Simon Wilcox
- Cindy Williams

A production in Ottawa in 2006 included Senators Lillian Dyck and Nancy Ruth in the cast.

== Performances in other countries ==
The Vagina Monologues has been performed in 77 countries. Some details below:

=== Albania ===
- Directed by Altin Basha, The Vagina Monologues has been playing in Albania since 2002. First time performance appeared on stage at "House Of Arts" (Tirana) on February 14, 2002.

Actresses:

- Eriona Kakeli
- Olta Daku
- Nigda Dako

=== Antigua and Barbuda ===
==== Actresses ====
- Heather Doram

=== Argentina ===
Actresses

- Alicia Bruzzo
- Andrea Pietra
- Araceli González
- Betiana Blum
- Catherine Fulop
- Emilia Mazer
- Fabiana Rey
- Florencia Peña
- Gabriela Toscano
- Graciela Dufau
- Karina Mazzocco
- María Fiorentino
- María Leal
- Mercedes Morán
- Pinky
- Silvina Chediek
- Susú Pecoraro
- Valeria Lynch

=== Australia ===
The play has been performed in Australia on a number of occasions. Many of the productions have been done as ensemble pieces, with the monologues being performed by an individual actress. Actresses, singers and politicians who have been involved with the Australian productions include:

- Danielle Antaki
- Lucy Bell
- Gillian Berry
- Amanda Blair
- Punita Boardman
- Tina Bursill
- Annie Byron
- Zoe Carides
- Terese Casu
- Penny Cook
- Marika Cominos
- Jenny Davis
- Rebekah Elmaloglou
- Judi Farr
- Nikki Fuda
- Deborah Galanos
- Vivienne Garrett
- Tottie Goldsmith
- Kath Gordon
- Sandy Gore
- Libbi Gorr
- Pippa Grandison
- Zara Swindells-Grose
- Jaslyn Hall
- Sophia Hall
- Noni Hazlehurst
- Cathy Henkel
- Happy Ho
- Fiona Horne
- Verity James
- Amanda Keller
- Odile Le Clezio
- Genevieve Lemon
- Lee Lewis
- May Lloyd
- Polly Low
- Susan Lyons
- Bree Maddox
- Colette Mann
- Tracy Mann
- Danielle Matthews
- Wendy Matthews
- Susan Maushart
- Jill Mckay
- Genevieve Mooy
- Amanda Muggleton
- Bojana Novakovic
- Caitlin Beresford-Ord
- Dina Panozzo
- Patricia Petersen
- Anne Phelan
- Geneviève Picot
- Susie Porter
- Leah Purcell
- Geraldine Quinn
- Pamela Rabe
- Denise Roberts
- Jenny Seaton
- Rainee Skinner
- Joy Smithers
- Elizabeth Spencer
- Wendy Strehlow
- Penelope Swales
- Karen Tighe
- Melissa Tkautz
- Abi Tucker
- Lucy Twomey
- Kym Vercoe
- Zenith Virago
- Tasma Walton
- Diana Warnock
- Giz Watson
- Jacki Weaver
- Julia Zemiro

=== Belgium ===
’The Vagina Monologues’ was performed by Members of the European Parliament in Brussels (European Parliament, Paul-Henri-Spaak building) on 6 March 2012.

Actresses

- Franziska Brantner (Greens, Germany)
- Isabelle Durant (Greens, Belgium)
- Marielle Gallo (EPP, France)
- Sirpa Pietikäinen (EPP, Finland)
- Ana Maria Gomes (S&D, Portugal)
- Kartika Tamara Liotard (GUE NGL, Netherlands)
- Ulrike Lunacek (Greens, Austria)
- Renate Weber (ALDE, Romania)
- Cecilia Wikström (ALDE, Sweden)

=== Brazil ===
Actresses

- Betina Viany
- Bia Nunnes
- Cissa Guimarães
- Cláudia Rodrigues
- Fafy Siqueira
- Lúcia Veríssimo
- Mara Manzan
- Tânia Alves
- Totia Meireles
- Vera Setta (the producer in Brazil and the mother of actress Morena Baccarin)
- Zezé Polessa

=== Chile ===
Director: Liliana Ross (1st Season), Katty Kowaleczko (2nd Season)

Actresses

- Katty Kowaleczko
- Francisca García-Huidobro
- Teresita Reyes
- Patricia Velasco
- Liliana Ross
- Grimanesa Jiménez
- Liliana García
- Sigrid Alegría
- Patricia Guzmán

=== China ===
The first mainland performance occurred at Sun Yat Sen University in 2003.

Premiered in March 2009. Produced by Théatre du Rêve Expérimental (薪传实验剧团).

- Official website

Director and Translator: Wang Chong (王翀)

Actresses: Alice Han Lin (林寒, U.S.), Xiao Wei (肖薇, China), Huang Rong (黄容, Taiwan)

=== Colombia ===
Director: Fanny Mikey

Actresses:

- Vicky Hernández
- Fabiana Medina
- Marcela Gallego
- Victoria Góngora
- Ana María Kamper
- Marcela Carvajal
- Diana Angel

=== Ecuador ===
Actresses:

- Martha Ormaza
- Elena Torres
- Juana Guarderas

=== Egypt ===
The first production of the monologues in Egypt was staged in 2004 by students of the American University of Cairo. The day after the staging it was condemned by Suzanne Mubarak, First Lady and President of the Egyptian National Women Committee.

=== France ===
Actresses:

- Anna Prucnal
- Christine Boisson, Andréa Ferréol (2003)
- Astrid Veillon, Sara Giraudeau, Isabelle Aubret (2005–6)

=== Hong Kong ===
The play was originally called "VV Story" (VV物語), but changed to Vagina Monologues (陰道獨白)in the re-run. It was performed in the City Hall from 4 July to 11 July 2007.

The actresses who performed in Hong Kong are:

- Crystal Kwok
- Koon-Lan Law
- Perry Jiao
- Margaret Chung
- Official website

=== Germany ===
Stuttgart (Martina Wrobel):

Berlin (Adriana Altaras): Hannelore Elsner, Katja Riemann, Ulrike Folkerts, Esther Schweins, Iris Berben, Sonja Kirchberger.

Trier (Fiona Lorenz):

=== Hungary ===
Note: It has been playing in Hungary since 2002 by two different troupes, one in the capital, Budapest in the "Thalía Theatre", and the other troupe travelling the country.

Thalía Theatre

Producer:

- Szurdi András

Director:

- Bozsik Yvette

Actresses:

- Fullajtár Andrea, Létay Dóra, Zarnóczay Gizi, Tóth Anita, Gryllus Dorka, Udvaros Dorottya

On the road company

Director:

- Moravetz Levente

Actresses:

- Xantus Barbara, Dévényi Ildikó, Nyertes Zsuzsa

=== India ===
The Indian production of The Vagina Monologues began playing in March 2003 at the Prithvi Theatre in Mumbai. It is produced by POOR-BOX PRODUCTIONS and directed by Mahabanoo Mody-Kotwal and her son Dr. Kaizaad Kotwal. It has been performed in Mumbai, Delhi, Bangalore, Hyderabad, Pune, Calcutta, Bhubhaneshwar, and Colombo in Sri Lanka.

Among other changes unique to this production, the original monologue "The Flood", which originally featured a Jewish woman, has been transformed into a story about an elderly Parsi woman. Additionally, another character was adapted as a Maharashtrian woman in the Indian production.

The play has been translated into both Hindi and Gujarati.

Actresses:

- Original cast:
  - Dolly Thakore
  - Avantika Akerkar
  - Jayati Bhatia
  - Sonali Sachdev
  - Mahabanoo Mody-Kotwal
  - Shivani Tanksale and Varshaa Agnihotri have filled in for certain performances.
- 2004: Jane Fonda and Marisa Tomei performed with the troupe around International Women's Day in Mumbai and Delhi. Their performance was banned in the South-Indian city of Chennai.
- May 29, 2005: Mallika Sherawat performed at the 100th show
- January 2007: The Hindi language translation of The Vagina Monologues titled Kissa Yoni Ka debuted in Mumbai at the NCPA's TATA Theatre. The cast included: Mahabanoo Mody-Kotwal, Dolly Thakore, Varshaa Agnihotri, Russika Duggal, Geetika Tyagi and Shivani Tanksale. The last two have been replaced by Dilnaz Irani since August 2008.
- March 2009: In honor of the 200th show of The Vagina Monologues in India, several Bollywood stars performed, including Imran Khan, Farhan Akhtar, Zoya Akhtar, Loveleen Tandan, Sandip Soparrkar, Sid Makkar, Jessy Randhawa, Smilie Suri, and Nairika Kotwal-Cornett.

=== Indonesia ===
The Vagina Monologues was translated into Indonesian by Gracia D. Adiningsih and was adapted by Jajang C. Noer and Nursyahbani Katjasungkana, who is also an MP in Indonesia.

The Monologue was performed for the first time in Indonesia on March 8, 2002, in Jakarta, as part of the Women's Day celebration. It was staged at the Taman Ismail Marzuki, Jakarta Cultural Center. Some performers had doubts about the performance because the theme might be considered taboo and sensitive by some people in that country.

The performance was repeated in Yogyakarta on March 31 – April 1, 2004, and at the Cultural Center of Bengkulu, Sumatra on August 19, 2004.

Actresses:

The Vagina Monologues was performed by Indonesian actresses such as Sarah Azhari, Niniek L. Karim, Devi Permatasari, Cindy Fatika, Enno Lerian, Rima Melati, Jajang C. Noer, Nursyahbani Katjasungkana, Ratna Riantiarno, Ria Irawan, Wulan Guritno, Rachel Maryam, Cornelia Agatha, etc.

=== Israel ===
The first performances were done in spring of 2001. The following year, it was performed in English at Merkaz Hamagshamim Theater in Jerusalem as well as in Hebrew in Tel Aviv. The English performance had vocal music vignettes between each new scene. (The English cast was also invited to perform there production in Riga, Latvia for the Latvian International theater festival.) The Vagina Monologues were performed in English in Jerusalem, Israel by the Hebrew Union College-Jewish Institute of Religion as a benefit for The Jerusalem Rape Crisis Center as part of V-Day events at least since 2005. It was performed in Russian in 2006.

The show has also been produced by The Stage in an English-language performance incorporating 13 monologues in February 2014, in Tel Aviv, directed by S. Asher Gelman.

Actresses:

- Bianca Ambrosio
- Devorah Barenholtz
- Yedida Bernstein Goren
- Ma'ayan Dekel
- Shira Dickler
- Sue Field
- Shoshana Friedman
- Sharon Kirschner
- Renana Lev-Oren
- Carson Reiners
- Adaya Turkia
- Jade Wepener
- Lisa Zigel

The Vagina Monologues was translated into Hebrew

Actresses: The Vagina Monologues was performed by Israeli actresses such as Gila Almagor, Michal Yannai, Yael Bar Zohar, etc.

=== Japan ===
Actresses:

- Shungicu Uchida
- Naoko Nozawa
- Chizuru Azuma

=== Kenya ===
Actresses:

- Mumbi Kaigwa brought The Vagina Monologues to Kenya where it opened on 23 March 2003 for the first time in Africa.
- Lorna Irungu

=== Macedonia ===
It is performed by Bitola Theater since April 2007. Actresses:

- Ilina Corevska
- Mence Bojadzieva
- Julijana Stojanovska
- Elena Mose

=== Mexico ===
The Vagina Monologues opened in Mexico on October 19, 2000, and in November 2009 celebrated its 5,800th performance. It has a record 110 continuous weeks of uninterrupted performances, and on October 19, 2010, holds for Mexico an unsurpassable ten-year run. It is the only theatrical event which constantly presents 12 performances a week in Mexico City, on top of the touring versions reaching almost a hundred towns in the country. Its five venues in the capital have been: Nuevo Teatro Sala Chopin; Teatro Gran Meliá; Teatro del Hotel NH; Centro Cultural San Ángel; and Nuevo Teatro del Hotel NH. After 14 years playing in Mexico, On May 6, 2014, the Mexican Production will become the first revival of the show in New York at the Westside Theatre Downstairs (The original theatre were the first US production was shown), making it the first open run engagement totally in Spanish. The producers are OCESA Teatro and Morris Gilbert, and has been translated into Spanish by Susana Moscatel and Erick Merino.

Director: Abby Epstein

Actresses and Performers:

- Sofía Álvarez
- Lilia Aragón
- Lidia Ávila
- Nuria Bages
- Rosángela Balbó
- Rocío Banquells
- Alejandra Barros
- Pilar Boliver
- Diana Bracho
- Itatí Cantoral
- Laura Cortés
- Marintia Escobedo
- Martha Figueroa
- Laura Flores
- Mónica Garza
- Raquel Garza
- Ana Karina Guevara
- Luz María Jerez
- Lupita Jones
- Claudia Lizardi
- Andrea Legarreta
- Diana Leln
- Irma Lozano
- Laura Luz
- Joanydka Mariel
- Sylvia Mariscal
- Beatríz Martínez
- Irene Moreno
- Susana Moscatel
- Anabel Ochoa
- Bricia Orozco
- Dominika Paleta
- Ludwika Paleta
- Anilú Pardo
- Dalílah Polanco
- Jana Raluy
- María Rebeca
- Patricia Reyes Spíndola
- Lizzy Rodríguez
- Adriana Roel
- Stephanie Salas
- Irasema Terrazas
- Joana Vega Biestro
- Yolanda Ventura

Note: Since it opened, over 80 women: actors, communicators, singers, sexologists, journalists, dancers, politicians and social and political activists have performed in the Mexican production.

=== New Zealand ===
Directors:

- Caroline Bell-Booth
- Rachel House
- Sylvia Rands
- Sam Shore

Actresses:

- Beth Allen
- Hannah Banks
- Alison Bruce
- Lisa Chappell
- Chelsie Preston-Crayford
- Jacque Drew
- Michele Hine
- Gabrielle Henderson
- Rachel House
- Anna Jullienne
- Natalie Medlock
- Rachel Nash
- Toni Potter
- Antonia Prebble
- Sylvia Rands
- Jodie Rimmer
- Sophie Roberts
- Fleur Saville
- Fern Sutherland
- Sara Wiseman

=== Nigeria ===
Director: Ifeoma Fafunwa

Actresses:

- Bukky Ajayi
- Iyabo Amoke
- Teni Aofiyebi
- Rita Dominic
- Erelu Dosumu
- Zara Dosumu
- Ireti Doyle
- Marie Ekpere
- Kate Henshaw-Nuttal
- Omono Imobhio
- Joke Silva

=== Perú ===
- Pilar Brescia
- Ivonne Frayssinet
- Regina Alcóver
- Laura Borlini
- Bettina Oneto
- Elena Romero
- Ana Cecilia Natteri
- Gisela Valcárcel
- Stephanie Orué
- Denisse Dibós
- Mónica Sánchez
- Melania Urbina
- Ana Sofía Toguchi
- Attilia Boschetti
- Madgyel Ugaz
- Nidia Bermejo
- Ebelin Ortiz
- Elva Alcandré
- Ana Cecilia Natteri
- Denise Arregui
- Milena Alva
- Gisela Ponce de León

=== Portugal ===
Guida Maria:

Actresses:

- Guida Maria
- São José Correia
- Ana Brito e Cunha

=== Russia ===
Director:

Actresses:

- Vera Voronkova
- Anna Galinova
- Ekaterina Konisevich

=== South Korea ===
Date: March 2007
It was held in March 2007 with volunteers from abroad and domestic. It was named as 'The Vagina Monologues 2007' (V-Day Seoul). The performance, especially, honored the women of The House of Sharing (a home for former comfort women) as Vagina Warriors by putting on a monologue, 'Say It'. And V-Day Spotlight 2007 addresses Women in Conflict Zones because was exponentially increases the crimes of violence against women and girls. It has planned to perform again in 2008 by V-Day Seoul Team.

Language: Korean & English (Subtitle was submitted)

Actresses:

- Introduction - Jyoung-Ah, Andrea, Katherine
- Hair - Sun-Young
- Wear and Say - Karla, Shauna, Laurie
- The Flood - Meryl
- The Vagina Workshop - Jin-Hyung
- Because He Liked to Look At It - Katherine
- I Was 12. My Mother Slapped Me - Seh-Eun, Yukyung, Jin-Sun, Jin-Hyung
- Not-So-Happy Fact - Shauna
- Say It, For the Comfort Women - Andrea
- My Angry Vagina - Ama
- My Vagina Was My Village - Yukyung
- The Little Coochi Snorcher That Could - Jyoung-Ah
- Smell - Andrea, So-Maria
- My Short Skirt - Juhyun
- Reclaiming Cunt - Angela
- A six-year-old girl was asked - Seh-Eun, Yukyung
- The Woman Who Loved to Make Vaginas Happy - Laura
- I Was There In the Room - Sun-Young
- 2007 Spotlight Monologue - Jin-Sun

Date: Sept.- Nov., 2006

Language: Korean

Director:

- Ji Na YI

Actress:

- Jang Yeong Nam

=== South Africa ===
The production cited here was a College Campaign production and was run by the students of the University of KwaZulu Natal, Howard College, Durban in April 2006. Funded by AK Print, Afriscan, Badge It!, Ish Ramkissoon Surveys and aided by the university's department of Drama & Performance Studies, the production focused on reaching students via 'South African-ising' the play and locating the monologues in a South African socio-cultural and political context. AS the play is located in an American context, the actresses felt that the text should be tweaked so as to show a bit more of an African vibe. For this purpose, the director was accepting of the fact that a lot of the actresses added in South African references such as events, words in isiZulu and commentary on current affairs in South Africa. Male students from the university were eager to help and they did help in terms of administration, lighting, sound, advertising as well as merchandise and ticket sales. The show was sold out for all performance nights and the proceeds went to the Advice Desk for the Abused in Durban. The university hopes to make the play an annual event.

Director: Nikita Ramkissoon

Actresses:

- Tarryn-Lee Stevenson
- Maggie Brown
- Illasha Ramaloo
- Erin Evashevski
- Lwazi Tshabalala
- Zanele Thobela
- Kerensa Naiker
- Lauren Johnson
- Nothando Mtshali
- Raeesa Abdul-Karrim
- Karen Peters
- Lauren Metzer
- Eva Jackson
- Nikita Ramkissoon
- Ongezwa Mbele
- Samantha Govender

=== Taiwan ===
The Vagina Monologues has been performed by the Garden of Hope Foundation (GOH) in Taiwan since 2005. In the first year, the GOH worked together with Taiwan Women's Link and the Taipei Association of Women's Rights to stage a bilingual Chinese-English performance of the play.

Since 2006, the GOH has staged the monologues with its own staff performing the roles. The GOH is an NGO that offers services to women and girls who are victims of domestic violence and sexual abuse. By playing out the stage roles, the GOH employees say they are able to identify more closely with their clients.

In the 2012 show, GOH employees were joined by the Barefoot Alice theater group – a group of actresses who were victims of sexual abuse or domestic violence in the past, and who came up through one of the GOH's counseling centers. The actors performed “playback” improvised skits of stories told by members of the audience.

Past performances:

- 2005: Red Play House, Taipei
- 2006: Jingguo Theater, Sanchong
- 2007: Shiquan Movie Theater, Kaohsiung
- 2008: Tunghai University, Taichung
- 2009: Taitung Railway Art Village Theater & Hualien Cultural and Creative Industries Park
- 2010: Chung Yuan University Concert Hall, Taoyuan
- 2011: Preparatory Office of the Wei Wu Ying Center for the Arts, Kaohsiung
- 2012: Garden of Hope central office, New Taipei City

2012 Performers:

GOH employees:

- Guo Yuyin (郭育吟)
- Wang Pinxuan (王品璇)
- Pang Chenchen (龐珍珍)
- Lin Jiayuan (林佳緣)
- Kelly Li
- Debra Ji
- Li Miaofen (李妙芬)
- Zhou Yuru(周育如)
- Gao Zhenxuan (高振軒) (male experience)

Barefoot Alice theater group members:

- Yangyoung
- Rao Huihui (饒蕙蕙)
- Shrek
- Lin Shufen (林淑芬)
- Fang Manzhen (方滿珍)

=== Turkey ===
The Vagina Monologues (Vajina Monologları, in Turkish) has been performed at various venues throughout Turkey since February 2003, with the original production taking place at the Barış Manço Cultural Center in Kadıköy, Istanbul under the direction of Almula Merter, who also translated the original script. The play, which had originally raised concerns of indecency and was denied access to venues at some publicly funded theaters, was ultimately performed to great success and subsequently inspired the locally penned 2008 book "İşte Böyle Güzelim" ("This is How I Am Beautiful") - a collection of interviews and essays on the female experience and women's sexuality in Turkey influenced by the style and greater mission of The Vagina Monologues.

Director: Almula Merter

Actresses:

- Berna Öztürk
- Arzu Yanardağ
- Müge Oruçkaptan
- Güner Özkul
- Ayşe Şule Bilgiç

=== United Kingdom ===
- Carol Smillie
- Karen Dunbar
- Sally Lindsay
- Margaret John †
- Nikki Sanderson
- Ruth Madoc
- Sharon Osbourne
- Linda Robson
- Rula Lenska

=== Uruguay ===
Los monólogos de la vagina was performed with success in 2007 in the Metro theatre. The earnings were donated to Casa de la Mujer de la Unión, an NGO advocating for women rights and against gender violence.

Several celebrities were on stage:

- Sara Perrone (television presenter)
- Beatriz Massons (actress and theatre teacher)
- Verónica Linardi (actress)
- Beatriz Argimón (politician)
- Glenda Rondán (politician)
- Mónica Bottero (journalist)
- Fernanda Cabrera (news anchor)
- Soledad Ortega (television presenter)
- Carolina García (television presenter)
- Ana Prada (singer)
- Malena Muyala (tango singer)
- Samantha Navarro (singer)
- Natalia Trenchi (psychiatrist)
- Teresa Herrera (sociologist)
- Alda Novell (female soccer activist)
- Fanny Puyesky (feminist writer)
- Catalina Ferrand (television presenter)
- Carolina Cabrera (communicator)
- Paola Penino (educator)
- Lizzete Uyterhoeven (teacher)

=== Venezuela ===
Director: Héctor Manrique

Producer: Carolina Rincón

Actresses:

- Caridad Canelón
- Fabiola Colmenares
- Elba Escobar
- Beatriz Valdés
- Tania Sarabia
- Gledys Ibarra
- Carlota Sosa
- Eva Moreno
