= Dedicated to My Ex =

Dedicada a mi ex
- Theatrical release poster
- Directed by: Jorge Ulloa
- Written by: Jorge Ulloa; Julio Pañi; Diego Ulloa; Nataly Valencia
- Produced by: Natalia Echeverri; Andrés Calderón
- Starring: Raúl Santana; Nataly Valencia; Carlos Alcántara Vilar; Biassini Segura
- Cinematography: Alejo Chauvin
- Edited by: Jorge Ulloa
- Music by: Paulina Aguirre
- Production companies: Sony Pictures International Productions; Touché Films; Dynamo Producciones; Tondero Distribución
- Distributed by: Sony Pictures Releasing International
- Release date: November 8, 2019
- Running time: 94 minutes
- Countries: Ecuador; Colombia
- Language: Spanish

Dedicated To My Ex (Spanish: Dedicada a mi ex) is a 2019 Ecuadorian-Colombian comedy film co-written and directed by Jorge Ulloa, starring Raúl Santana, Nataly Valencia, Carlos Alcántara Vilar and Biassini Segura. The film also features YouTube personalities such as Werevertumorro, Luisito Comunica, Yoseline Hoffman, Kika Nieto and Fernanfloo.

== Synopsis ==
The film tells the story of Ariel, a 21-year-old man who decides to form a rock band to compete for a prize of ten thousand dollars in a band contest. He does this as a last resort to get money to save his relationship and reunite with his ex-girlfriend, who has broken up with him as a result of obtaining an internship in Finland. Ariel, together with his friend Ortega, decide to carry out an audition to find the other members of the band, despite the fact that they know nothing about music, and they end up forming a band with members who have diverse and opposite personalities.

== Production ==
The film was created and directed by Jorge Ulloa, director and talent of Enchufe.tv, in co-production with the production companies Touché Films from Ecuador, Tondero from Peru and Dynamo from Colombia. The writing of the script was in the hands of five people and it took about a year, while the filming was done in five weeks during 2017, and the post-production took about a year.

The film was shot mostly in Bogotá, Colombia, with some scenes shot in Quito, Ecuador and one scene shot in Los Angeles, United States. Due to its filming, the film had funds from the Ministry of Culture of Colombia, officially considering it as a Colombian production.

== Cast ==
The cast is made up of Ecuadorian artists and members of Enchufe.tv, such as Nataly Valencia, Raúl Santana, Orlando Herrera, Erika Russo, Eduardo "Mosquito" Mosquera, Alfredo Espinosa, Paula Aguirre, Álex Cisneros and Martha Ormaza, as well as an appearance by the director Jorge Ulloa. Among the international actors are the Mexicans Mariana Treviño and Eugenio Derbez, the Peruvian Carlos Alcántara, the Colombians Jorge Enrique Abello and Biassini Segura, Lorna Cepeda and Alina Lozano. It also featured the special participation of several Latin American YouTubers such as Luisito Comunica, Werevertumorro, Mox, YosStoP, Kika Nieto and Fernanfloo; and the comedian Iván Marín.

=== Characters ===
- Raúl Santana as Ariel, a young man with a low profile and fearful of change.
- Biassini Segura as Ortega, Ariel's best friend who helps cast the band.
- Carlos Alcántara as Néstor, an untalented Christian rocker and guitarist who becomes part of the musical band Rock N' Cola.
- Nataly Valencia as Felicia, a skilled, eccentric and rebellious drummer.

YosStoP, Luisito Comunica and Mox make an appearance during the audition to choose the members of the musical band, in which Yosstop auditions playing a violin, while the YouTuber Gabriel Montiel has an appearance in a television commercial seen by the protagonist, where he announces the battle of the bands contest. The YouTuber Fernanfloo also has an appearance in the film playing a waiter and the YouTuber Kika Nieto is the leader of the band called Malteada Pop, who will also compete in the battles of the bands.

== Release and distribution ==
The film was distributed for Latin America by Sony Pictures, the trailer was released in September 2019 for the Enchufe.tv social networks and premiered on November 8 of the same year in Ecuador. It was also released in Mexico, Colombia and Peru.

On February 5, 2021, the film premiered on the digital platform Netflix for all of Latin America, and in 2022 the film will arrive on HBO Max. A sequel is under consideration.
