= Martha Ormaza =

Ecuadorian actress, writer, and director (1959–2018)

- Born: Martha Ormaza Bermeo; July 13, 1959; Alausí Canton, Ecuador
- Died: October 22, 2018 (aged 59); Quito, Ecuador
- Education: Central University of Ecuador
- Occupation(s): Actress, writer, director

Martha Ormaza Bermeo (July 13, 1959 – October 22, 2018) was an Ecuadorian actress, writer, and director, a member of the theatrical group Las Marujitas.

== Biography ==
Martha Ormaza was born in Alausí Canton on July 13, 1959. She considered herself a native of Quito, having lived in the Ecuadorian capital since her first year. At age two she began attending Los Pinos school.

She studied at the Central University of Ecuador's Faculty of Law and obtained a licentiate in public and social sciences. After a vocational crisis, in which she felt she had erred in her choice of career, she never practiced law in Ecuador. While accompanying her mother-in-law to the rehearsal of a play, she was asked to fill in for a cast member who was absent. She impressed the director, Raúl Guarderas Guarderas, as a natural performer, and he convinced her to dedicate herself to the theater. Ormaza went on to act in films, theater, television, and radio.

In 1990, she played the Manabí native Encarnación, one of three protagonists in the play La Marujita se ha muerto con leucemia, directed by Guido Navarro and originally written by Luis Miguel Campos. After its success, she and her costars Juana Guarderas and Elena Torres, who played Abrilia and Cleta respectively, became widely known as Las Marujitas. Ormaza was often identified with her character as Doña Encarna or Maruja Mona. The three reprised their roles for decades, performing more than 1,800 times in the original play, its spin-offs, and radio and television segments.

In her acting career, Ormaza participated in artistic workshops such as El Clown, El actor y el bufón, La Máscara, La Comedia del Arte, El Teatro Gestual, La voz: instrumento para la creación de personajes, El comic: medio de comunicación, La voz: instrumento pre expresivo, Ritmo y percusión, and Tango. She was also part of the company of the Teatro Patio de Comedias Cultural Corporation.

She acted in plays such as The Maids, The Vagina Monologues, Trama, dama y chocolate, Las Marujas entre tereques, Machos (directed by Christoph Baumann), Maldita sea, No quiero ser bella, El miedo imaginario de Amparito A Dios, La Tránsito Smith ha sido secuestrada, La mierda, El eterno femenino, and Esperando al Coyot. On television, she appeared in the Ecuavisa productions Fiebre de amor, Dejémonos de vainas, Pasado y Confeso, and De la vida real, the TC Televisión series Las mujeres de Pocholo, and miniseries such as El chulla Romero y Flores, Los Sangurimas, and El milagro de las cuevas. She was also a cast member of the filmed plays The House of Bernarda Alba and La última escapada. She acted in several sketches on the YouTube series Enchufe.tv. Her last film work was in 2017, in the film Dedicada a mi ex, directed by Jorge Ulloa, which premiered in 2019.

In 2013, Ormaza was diagnosed with cancer, which she would struggle with for several years. Together with her friends, she organized the "Qumiofarras", a gala of solidarity for people with cancer, with proceeds going toward their treatment. 2015's edition was carried out by friends on her behalf, as she could not attend due to health complications. She died due to illness in Quito on October 22, 2018.

The last work she directed that premiered before her death was Tres historias del mar, which opened on October 20, 2018, at the Malayerba Theater. She also wrote and directed the cantata La Serenísima Madre de las Flores, which premiered on October 24 and 25, 2018, in the chapel of the Museo de la Ciudad.

Her friend Juana Guarderas organized a tribute titled Martha Ormaza: Una vida de teatro, which ran from January 9 to February 17, 2019, at the Patio de Comedias, where she had begun her acting career. It presented three works written and directed by Ormaza – A la luz de los hechos on January 9, Tres historias del mar from January 10 to 13, and La Serenísima Madre de las Flores from January 17 to February 17.

== Recognition ==
Ormaza received the Benjamin Carrión Award from the Casa de la Cultura Ecuatoriana for her work in the theater. She was nominated for the Premio Eugenio Espejo, and in 2017 she won the Francisco Tobar García Award.
