= The Women of India Leadership Summit =

Women's organisation based in India

The Women of India Leadership Summit now renamed Women of India Summit was founded by Divya Chandra and Mudita Chandra was held at the India Islamic Cultural Centre in New Delhi, India. The summit aims to help the urban women in the National Capital Region to empower themselves. It is the only Women's summit in the country that actively creates programs for both men and women, in its attempt to address the problem of gender inequality at various levels of the society.

== History ==
The Summit was conceived as a response to the 2012 Nirbhaya rape case that saw thousands coming together for a nationwide protest against the lack of safety that led to the death of 23-year-old medical student who was brutally raped by four men on a bus. The aim of the Summit is that by 2025 Delhi should stop being known as the rape capital of the country and instead be the place where women have created enough safety and security for themselves by being in charge of all that helps them become independent. Topics included Self defense, Creating safety and security, Financial Independence, Legal rights, Creating balance, living alone and body image.

The first summit was held on 4 to 6 October 2013. Each Summit has its own unique theme that addresses one major area that women can improve upon. Last year, the theme was "Know Your Rights, Tap Your Potential, Transform Your Life".

A great line up of distinguished experts included: Internationally celebrated author and speaker, Christine Agro from New York, Lira Goswami, the founding partner of Associated Law Advisers, Aprajita Singh from the chambers of senior advocate Harish Salve, who is one of India's leading lawyers, who primarily practices at the Supreme Court of India; both of whom practice in New Delhi, Camini Kumar, who practices in all areas of family law including financial remedy, children (both private and public law), TLATA, Schedule 1 and domestic violence., Sara B. Willerson, a private practice licensed clinical worker and works with the modality of equine facilitated psychotherapy in her practice with children, adolescents, and adults; Chief Strategy Office India, JWT Mumbai, Bindu Sethi; Writer, adviser on strategy, media, education and healthcare, Samit Tandon, Design Curator and Writer Mayank Mansingh Kaul and Ireena Vittal who is an acclaimed strategic consultant on emerging markets, agriculture and urban development joined the Wipro Board of Directors in October 2013. Ms Ireena Vittal, a former partner with McKinsey & Co,

The summit admitted many notable personalities such as the actor, director, social activist and a theatre artist Nandita Das, designer & entrepreneur Poonam Bhagat and the Emmy awardee and Karamveer Chakra Award winner Kaizaad Kotwal who brought The Vagina Monologues to the forum; as key speakers and participants in different sessions.

== 2014 conference ==
The second annual conference of The Women of India Summit took place on 18 to 20 September 2014 at India Islamic Cultural Centre, New Delhi. The theme was "Invest in yourself" aiming to reach out to women with topics such as Boundaries, Invest in yourself, re-defining masculinity and defeating rape culture.

That year the Summit had speakers such as: Naina Lal Kidwai, a chartered accountant by profession, is an Indian banker and business executive; actress and producer of Vagina Monlogues in India, Mahabanoo mody-Kotwal; the Emmy awardee and Karamveer Chakra Award winner Kaizaad Kotwal who brought The Vagina Monologues to the forum last year; designer & entrepreneur Poonam Bhagat and Chief Strategy Office India, JWT Mumbai, Bindu Sethi among others.

== Sessions ==
The 1887 session of congress was addressed by Anusuiya Bharti marked Congress intention towards women empowerment. The various sessions at the summit confirm interactive participation. Apart from the daily sessions, the summit also includes various 'take a break' sessions and performances. This year the sessions include those for men such as defeating rape culture, re-defining masculinity 2014 and boundaries among others in order to encourage men to be active participants in making India safer for women.
