= Luisito Comunica =

Mexican YouTuber and blogger

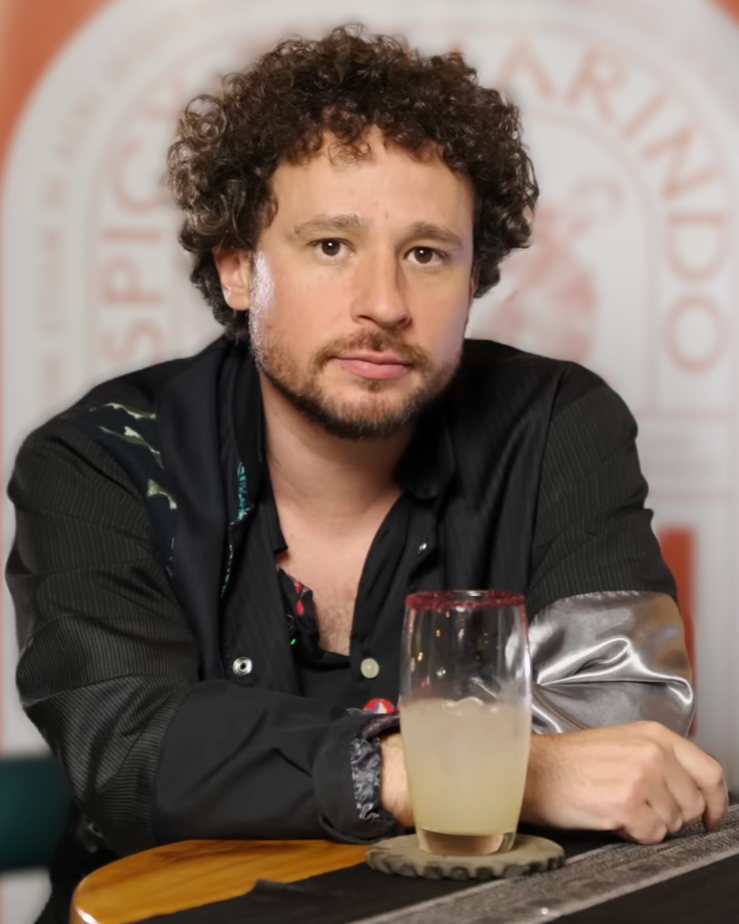
- Luisito Comunica in 2024
- Born: Luis Arturo Villar Sudek; 20 March 1991 (age 35); Puebla, Mexico
- Education: Eastern Institute of Puebla; Meritorious Autonomous University of Puebla
- Occupations: YouTuber; Blogger
- Partner: Arianny Tenorio (2020-present)

YouTube information
- Channel: Luisito Comunica
- Years active: 2010-present
- Genre: Travel blog
- Subscribers: 45.5 million
- Views: 11.4 billion
- Last updated: 17 July 2025
- Website: elreypalomo.com

Luis Arturo Villar Sudek (born 20 March 1991), better known as Luisito Comunica, is a Mexican YouTuber and blogger. His channel is the second most subscribed in Mexico, behind Badabun, as well as the ninth most subscribed in the Spanish-speaking world.

== Early life ==
Luis Arturo Villar Sudek was born in Puebla de Zaragoza on 20 March 1991. Luisito is of maternal Czech descent; his grandfather migrated to Mexico for opportunities, but died when Luisito was very little. He has an older brother, Federico.

Luisito attended the Instituto Oriente de Puebla, and later studied communication sciences at the Benemérita Universidad Autónoma de Puebla (BUAP). However he did not complete the degree, instead dedicating himself to work as an English teacher, in a school that admitted students expelled from other institutions.

In 2010, Luisito started a YouTube channel called "Piano Para Gente Cool", later renamed "LouieArtie", which was aimed at making tutorials and piano covers of songs, the channel was unsuccessful and was therefore abandoned. On 19 October 2011, he created another channel called "OciodeLuisito", in which he uploaded videos of daily life. The channels most watched video is "Uncomfortable Dog (at the wheel)" which was the last video uploaded. The channel is currently inactive.

== Career ==
In 2012, he joined the YouTube team "NoMeRevientes", led by Yayo Gutiérrez. He later said on that "NoMeRevientes" was a great help in his growth as YouTuber. In April of the same year, he created his own channel called "Luisito Comunica". This channel, dedicated entirely to travel videos, was far more successful than his previous ones. In addition he moved from Puebla to Mexico City to have access to better opportunities. In 2017, Google invited him to map the Papalote Museo del Niño, and on 22 April 2018, he created "Luisito Around the World", a YouTube channel targeted at English-speaking audiences.

In 2018, he launched a clothing line under the name "Rey Palomo", his pseudonym. In 2019, he appeared in the film Dedicada a mi ex. The same year he appeared in the Latin American Spanish dubbed version of Sonic the Hedgehog as the voice of Sonic. In November 2019 a Change.org petition was created for voice actor Yamil Atala, who voiced Sonic in Sonic Underground and Wreck-It Ralph, to play the role instead. The petition gathered 26,847 signatures by 14 February deadline. This had no effect, however, and Luis voiced the character.

In October of the same year, he published his first book entitled Lugares Asombrosos: Travesías insólitas y otras maneras extrañas de conocer el mundo. In 2020 he created "En Cortinas con Luisito", a podcast distributed through Spotify, YouTube and Instagram. On 9 June 2020, he participated in the YouTube Originals documentary "Aislado: un documental en cuarentena" together with Juanpa Zurita, recounting the isolation that occurred due to the COVID-19 pandemic. In October of the same year, he announced that he would launch his own mobile phone company under the name "PilloFon".

In December 2020, he bought the shares of the Japanese food restaurant Deigo & Kaito, located in Mexico City. Later in 2021 he launched a tequila called Gran Malo. He currently lives in Mexico City. In October 2021, he opened a fast food franchise known as Fasfu in the countries of Mexico, Peru and Colombia, to mixed reviews.

In January 2023, he was one of six prominent YouTubers from around the world invited to cover the annual conference of the World Economic Forum.

== Awards and recognitions ==
Eliot Awards

Year	Nominated work	Category	Result
2016	—N/a	Storyteller	Won
2017	—N/a	Storyteller	Won
2018	—N/a	Lider Digital del año	Won
2020	—N/a	Lider Digital del año	Nominated

MTV Millennial Awards

Year	Nominated work	Category	Result
2017	—N/a	Ícono Miaw del Año	Nominated
2018	—N/a	Ícono Miaw del Año	Nominated
2021	—N/a	Storiador Miaw	Nominated
2021	En Cortinas con Luisito	Amo del Podcast	Nominated

GQ

Year	Nominated work	Category	Result
2018	—N/a	Personalidad Digital	Won

Socialiteen Awards

Year	Nominated work	Category	Result
2020	—N/a	Influencer del Año	Won

Kids Choice Awards México

Year	Nominated work	Category	Result
2020	Aislado: un documental en cuarentena	Inspiración del Año	Nominated

== Filmography ==
Year	Title	Role	Note
2019	Dedicada a mi ex	Casting participant	
2020	Sonic the Hedgehog	Sonic the Hedgehog	Latin American Spanish Dub
2020	Around the World in 80 Seconds	Sonic the Hedgehog	Latin American Spanish Dub
2020	Aislado: un documental en cuarentena		
2022	Sonic the Hedgehog 2	Sonic the Hedgehog	Latin American Spanish Dub
2022	Sonic Drone Home	Sonic the Hedgehog	Latin American Spanish Dub
2024	Sonic the Hedgehog 3	Sonic the Hedgehog	Latin American Spanish Dub

== Works ==
- (2019) Lugares Asombrosos: Travesías insólitas y otras maneras extrañas de conocer el mundo. Penguin Random House. ISBN 607-318-699-1.
