= Quasar Thakore-Padamsee =

Indian actor and director (born 1978)

Quasar Thakore Padamsee (born 20 August 1978) is an Indian stage actor turned theatre director. Both his parents, Alyque Padamsee and Dolly Thakore, are renowned stage actors. His mother was a casting director for the Academy Award-winning film Gandhi in 1982. His father played the role of Jinnah in the same movie.

He studied English literature at St. Xavier's College in Mumbai. Though he started his career following his father, as an adman, he soon switched full-time theatre by starting Mumbai based theatre company called QTP, with partners Arghya Lahiri, Christopher Samuel, Nadir Khan, Toral Shah and Vivek Rao.

He played cricket for Singapore U-19 team that won the inaugural Tuanku Jaafar Cup. He was an effective left arm medium pacer.

Since 1999, he has directed and produced over 20 plays with theatre company, QTP. He also works as a stage manager and lighting designer for the theatre productions. He was also the Assistant Director of Tim Supple's A Midsummer Night's Dream.

Plays directed by Quasar Thakore Padamsee include

- The Night Thoreau Spent in Jail
- Minorities
- All My Sons
- The Urban Burden
- A View From The Stage
- Acid
- Kindertansport
- Acid
- Khatijabai of Karmali Terrace
- Project S.t.r.i.p.
- A Peasant of El Salvador
- Mother Courage and her Children
- Every Brilliant Thing

In 2013, he directed "So Many Socks" which was nominated for the META Awards.
