= Diego Ulloa (actor) =

Ecuadorian actor and filmmaker (born 1992)

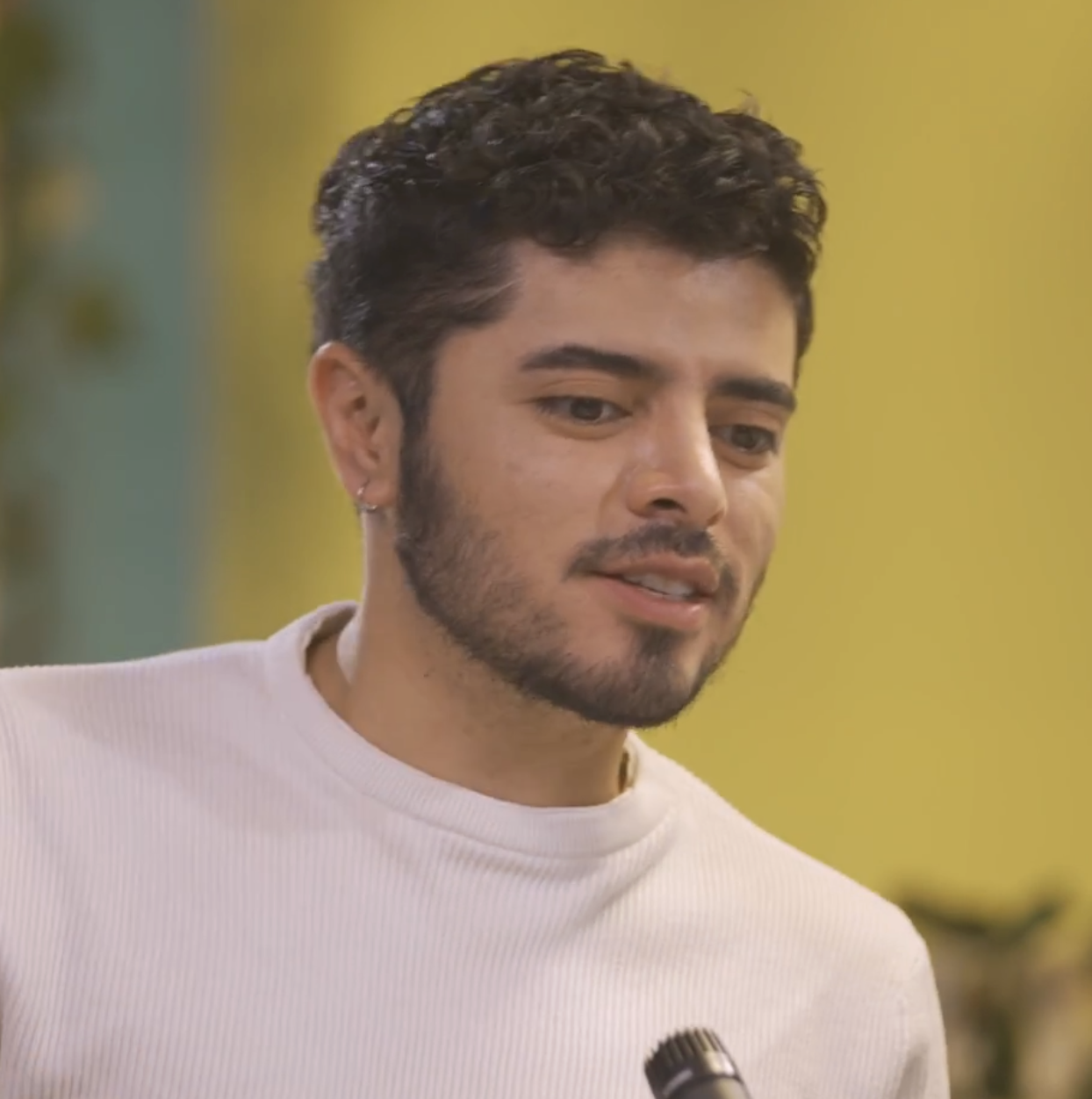
- Ulloa in 2022
- Born: 22 March 1992 (age 34); Cuenca, Ecuador
- Occupations: Actor; screenwriter; film director; producer
- Organization: Enchufe.tv

Diego Ulloa (born 22 March 1992) is an Ecuadorian actor, screenwriter, film director, and producer. He is known for having been one of the original cast members of the creative team of the comedy sketch web series Enchufe.tv. He was also a screenwriter for the films Dedicated To My Ex (2019) and Amor en tiempos de likes (2022).

== Early life and education ==
He was born on 22 March 1992 in Cuenca, Azuay Province. From the age of 11, he lived in the city of Pasaje and at 18, he moved to Quito, where he began studying at the Incine Universitario.

== Career ==
During his time at Incine, he met the creators of Enchufe.tv and joined the channel's cast as an extra in some of its early videos. Later, he began to play more roles until he landed a starring role in the video "Super Campeonas", which helped Enchufe.tv achieve international fame and by 2024, it had surpassed one hundred million views on YouTube.

He later participated in the web series Mortal Glitch (2020), produced by YouTube Originals, and was one of the screenwriters of the film Dedicated To My Ex (2019). The first film born from his original idea was Amor en tiempos de likes (2022), a romantic comedy filmed in Cuenca that featured Ecuadorian personalities such as Erika Vélez, Danilo Carrera, and Carolina Jaume in its cast.

== Personal life ==
In November 2025, Ulloa announced his marriage to his boyfriend, Serghej Ferla, on social media. Ferla, who's Italian, and Ulloa have previously lived some time in Spain. The announcement went viral on social media, making the phrase "Love exists" (Spanish: El amor existe) a trending topic. Besides his fans, the event was celebrated by other members of Enchufe.tv. The wedding took place on 6 December 2025, at a hacienda in the Puembo area, northeast of Quito.

The wedding, which also partially took place in Quito, featured live music by Deysi Uva, and a Raffaella Carrá impersonation by Samadhi Márquez.
