= Dolly Thakore =

Indian actress

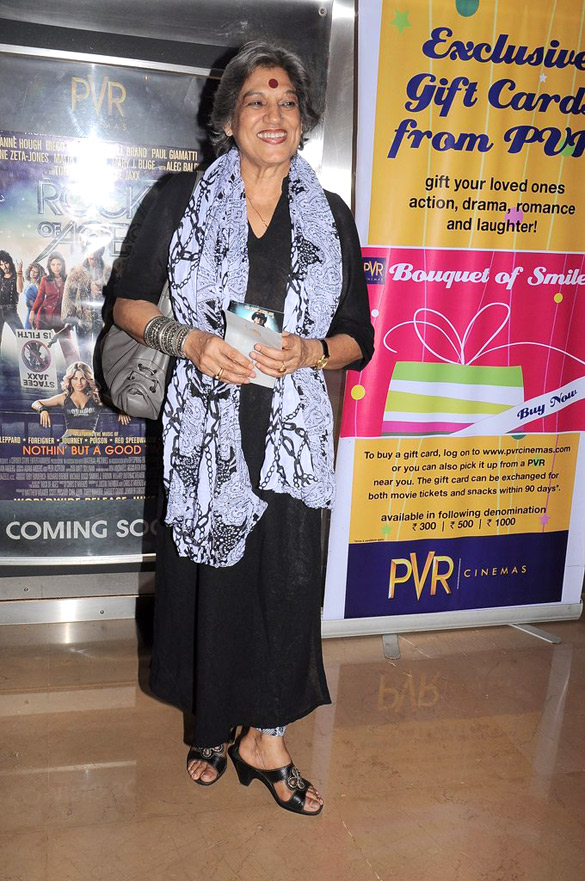
- Dolly at the premiere of Rock of Ages
- Born: Dolly Rawson; 10 March 1943 (age 83); Kohat, North West Frontier Province, British India
- Education: Miranda House
- Occupations: Stage actress, casting director
- Spouse: Dilip Thakore
- Partner: Alyque Padamsee
- Children: Quasar Padamsee

Dolly Thakore is a veteran Indian theatre actress and casting director.

== Early life and career ==
Dolly Thakore was born as Dolly Rawson at Kohat on 10 March 1943. Trained in radio and television with BBC London, she returned to India to become one of the leading newscasters and television hosts, interviewing prominent citizens from India and abroad. Thakore came into the limelight as News speaker in English for Mumbai Doordarshan at 8PM on TV. Most of her career has been spent on the stage, acting in plays by master playwrights including Tennessee Williams' Streetcar Named Desire, Arthur Miller’s All My Sons, Harold Pinter’s The Birthday Party, and Edward Albee’s Who’s Afraid of Virginia Woolf. She appeared in the 2005 film Page 3 and in White Noise.

Thakore began her film career as casting director and unit publicist with Richard Attenborough's Gandhi (1982). She was responsible for recruiting the Indian actors in the film and for some of the public relations work on the film. Since then she has worked on a number of Indian and international co-productions like Far Pavilions, Kim, Indiana Jones and the Temple of Doom, Jinnah, and Such a Long Journey.

In 1997, she was the casting assistant for the film Sixth Happiness. In 2006 she starred in the TV series Kya Hoga Nimmo Ka.

When Mahabanoo Mody-Kotwal and Kaizaad Kotwal debuted The Vagina Monologues in India in 2003, she was a member of the original cast, alongside Jayati Bhatia, Avantika Akerkar, and Sonali Sachdev.

Thakore is an enthusiastic theatregoer, who frequently contributes reviews of plays and films to leading newspapers and magazines.

== Personal life ==
Dolly was born into a conservative protestant Christian family. Her father worked in Air Force took her to various towns. She studied drama at Miranda House in New Delhi where she discovered her love for Drama.

Dolly met Dilip Thakore while working at BBC and fell in love. Dilip and Dolly signed Open marriage contract, married, and moved to Mumbai where Dilip practiced law.

In Mumbai, she fell in love with fellow stage actor and producer Alyque Padamsee. She divorced Dilip to live with Alyque and had a son - Quasar Padamsee. Quasar is also a theatre professional, and works as an actor, director, and producer in Mumbai.

== Films ==
- Page 3
- Bachchhan Paandey (2022)
