= McKinnon Secondary College =

Coordinates: 37°54′42″S 145°02′56″E

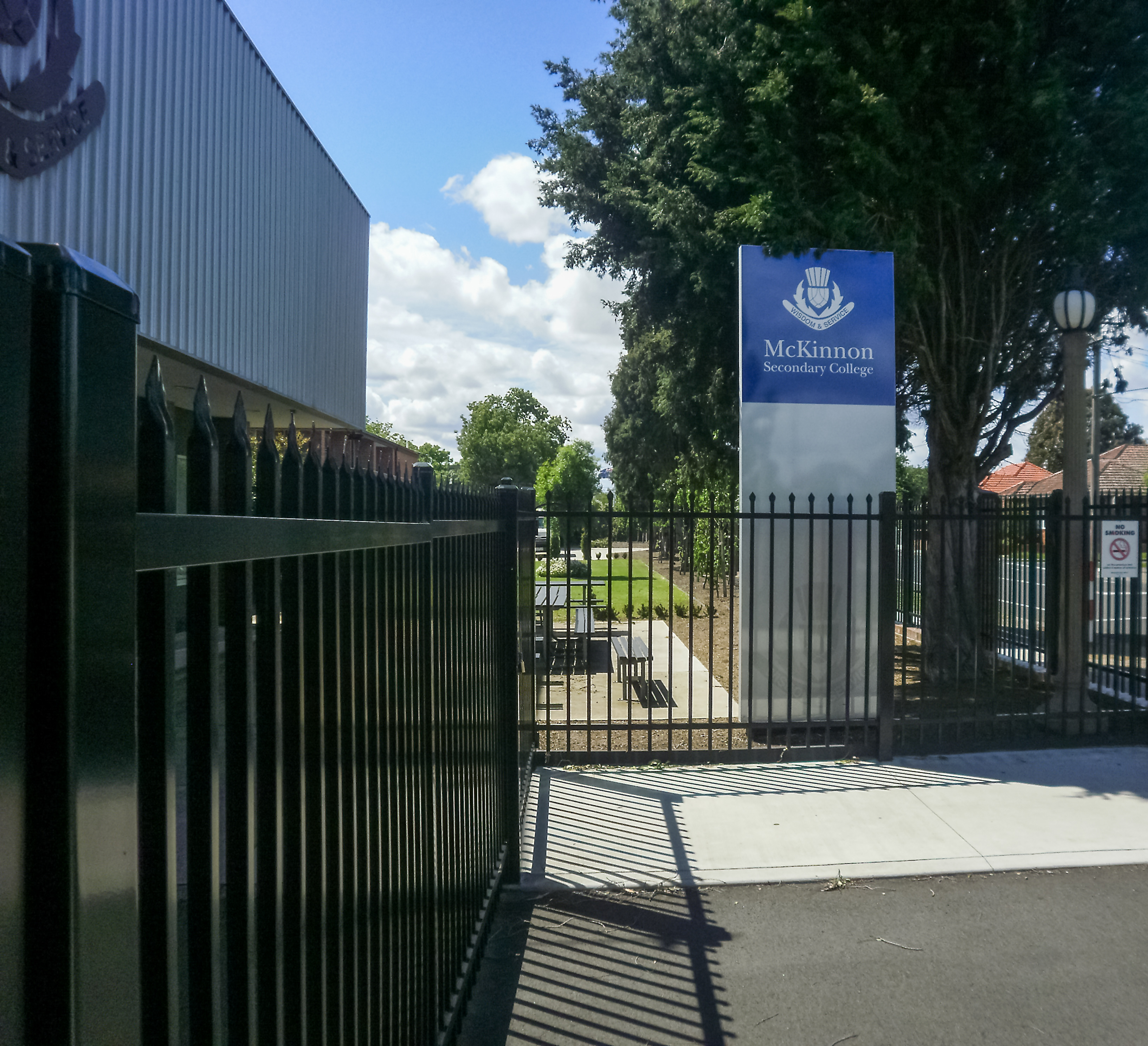
- 291a McKinnon Rd, McKinnon 3204 VIC, Australia; McKinnon, Victoria; Australia

Information
- School type: Public, coeducational, comprehensive day school
- Motto: Wisdom & Service
- Established: 1955
- Principal: Mr Michael Kan
- Years: 7–12
- Enrolment: 2,000+
- Colours: Navy blue, white, red, green
- Publication: McKinnon Newsletter
- Website: www.mckinnonsc.vic.edu.au

McKinnon Secondary College is a public secondary school located in the Melbourne suburb of McKinnon. The school was ranked 44th in Victoria in terms of percentage of study scores of 40 or above in 2023, making it the highest-ranked non-selective public school. In 2022, the school opened a second campus in Bentleigh East for Year 8 and Year 9 students. This new campus was officially dubbed the East Campus, and the original campus dubbed the McKinnon Road Campus. Michael Kan is the incumbent principal, taking over from Pitsa Binnion since her retirement at the end of 2022.

== Overview ==
McKinnon Secondary College is a coeducational secondary school, located in the bayside suburb of McKinnon, Victoria. It is one of the top performing, non-selectional government schools in Victoria.

== Facilities ==
=== McKinnon Road Campus ===
- Assembly Hall
- Gymnasium with mezzanine, and weights room
- Music Centre with auditorium and five music studios
- McKinnon Resource Centre, including Library
- McKinnon Exploration Research Centre (MERC)
- Pitsa Binnion Senior Centre, used for VCE classes (3 Levels)
- McKinnon Year Seven Transition centre (opened 2013)
- Alan Lawrence Lecture Theatre (with 250 seats, named after a long-serving ex-principal)
- Art/science/technology wing
- Korean garden with pond
- Canteen
- Multi-courts
- New Second Gym at the back of the school (opened 2022)
- Two Large Ovals (With Soccer goals, AFL Goals and Cricket pitch)

=== East Campus ===
- Main building (4 levels)
- Basketball courts

While the school previously had several computer labs with desktop computers running Windows and macOS, the majority of them were repurposed following the introduction of the school's Chromebook program, under which all students in the school are equipped with individual laptops running ChromeOS.

=== VCE results ===
McKinnon Secondary College is consistently in the top non-selective government schools in Victoria for the last decade, and in 2003 was the state system's second top non-selective-entry VCE school. In 2011 it was ranked 62nd in the state out of all schools. McKinnon Secondary College was ranked eighth out of all state secondary schools in Victoria based on VCE results in 2018, and sixth out of all state secondary schools in 2024.

=== Music ===
McKinnon Secondary has many instrumental groups that cater for people of different ability, instrument and music style preferences.

The colleges music ensembles include:

- Years 7 and 8 band
- Years 7 and 8 Strings
- Symphonic wind band
- Ovenden Band
- Intermediate Stage Band
- Senior Stage Band
- Orchestra
- Wind quintet
- Saxophone Ensemble
- String quartet
- Percussion ensemble
- Choir
- Senior singers

The music faculty at McKinnon holds performances such as the Spring and junior concerts. An event considered important in the school calendar is the Winter Concert, held annually at Robert Blackwood Hall, in Monash University. Every year, the college holds a House Music Festival, in which each house, Chisholm (blue), Monash (green), Gilmore (red) and Flynn (yellow), compete in three categories; instrumental, dancing and choral.

McKinnon Secondary also produces a musical every second year. The most recent musical to be performed by the college was The Wedding Singer in 2023. The next musical is planned to be Mary Poppins in 2025. Previous musicals in recent years include Little Shop of Horrors in 2015, Zombie Prom in 2013, The Wiz in 2011, Hot Mikado in 2009, and The Addams Family in 2017.

=== Languages ===
McKinnon Secondary offers three languages, German, Spanish and French. The school previously taught Korean.

It is compulsory for students in years 7 and 8 to learn a language. The college also hosts the Victorian School of Languages, which allows students to learn a language out of school in their own time as a subject for VCE. The VSL offers both Hebrew and Russian. This enables McKinnon students to learn another language, or their native language, as part of their VCE. Year 10 students have the opportunity to go on exchange trips to either Germany or New Caledonia (France) and have an exchange student live with them for a period of time. Since 2022, Mckinnon has added the opportunity to learn Spanish, with three dedicated teachers.

=== Enhancement programme ===
The college offers an enhanced maths and science programme for selected students called ELMS. Students can enrol in Maths ELMS in Year 7, and can enrol in Science ELMS from Year 8. The programme runs until year 9, then after all Maths ELMS students are enrolled into Year 11 Mathematical Methods. In Year 10, students can apply to be enrolled in Unit 1/2 VCE subjects, and subsequently, these students will continue to Unit 3/4 subjects in Year 11.

== Sports carnivals ==
McKinnon Secondary holds sports carnivals throughout the year where students compete for their houses; Chisholm, Monash, Gilmore and Flynn (blue, green, red and yellow, respectively). The three annual carnivals are swimming, athletics and cross-country. The highest-ranking students in these competitions go on to represent McKinnon at inter-school sporting events.

== Extra curricular activities ==
McKinnon Secondary offers activities including:

- Tournament of Minds
- Inter-school debating
- Philosophy Club and annual state Philosothon
- Sceptical Society
- Code Club
- Knitting Club
- Chess Club
- Retro Games Club
- Irish Dancing Club
- Pride Club
- D&D Club
- Magic The Gathering Club

== Uniform ==
Students are required to wear a uniform. The uniform policy is enforced by teachers. The colours of the uniform are blue, grey and white. There are two types of uniform; sport uniform and regular uniform. Sport uniform can only be worn on days when students have practical PE lessons, or interschool sport.

The regular summer uniform consists of a neck tie, button-up shirt and shorts/trousers for boys, and a dress for girls. During the winter, girls wear neck-ties and shirts as well, and can choose between a skirt or trousers. Additional accessories include a blazer, a jumper and a scarf. Students must wear black leather lace-up shoes while in regular uniform. During Term 2 and 3, blazers must be worn to and from school each day instead of the college pullover when not wearing sport uniform.

== Alumni ==
- Sarah Aarons, songwriter
- Harry James Angus, musician of The Cat Empire
- Sarah Dollard, screenwriter
- Max Gawn, AFL footballer
- James Frecheville, actor
- Danielle Matthews, singer
- James Paterson, Australian politician who has been a Senator for Victoria since 2016, representing the Liberal Party
- Rick Springfield, Australian-American musician and actor
- Sam Frost, AFL Footballer
- Jack Frost, AFL Footballer
- Harry Armstrong, AFL footballer
