= Las Marujitas =

- First appearance: La Marujita se ha muerto con leucemia; November 7, 1990
- Created by: Luis Miguel Campos
- Portrayed by: Juana Guarderas (Abrilla); Martha Ormaza (Encarna); Elena Torres (Cleta)

In-universe information
- Nationality: Ecuadorian

Las Marujitas are a group of three female characters originally created by Ecuadorian writer Luis Miguel Campos in the play La Marujita se ha muerto con leucemia who went on to appear in several spin-offs and related pieces. They were played by the actresses Juana Guarderas (Abrilla), Martha Ormaza (Encarna), and Elena Torres (Cleta) until Ormaza's death in 2018.

== History ==
In 1986, Luis Miguel Campos wrote a play named La Marujita Donoso se ha muerto de leucemia (La Marujita Donoso Has Died of Leukemia), a farce featuring three women representing Quito, Cuenca, and Manabí. They sit on a comfortable sofa in the living room of one of their houses to gossip, while a mutual friend is in agony. In the end, the phone rings and they receive the bad news of her death. They get depressed, but go back to trivial topics as if nothing had happened.

Although Campos' original work was not published, it was successfully adapted by director Guido Navarro in 1990 under the title La Marujita se ha muerto con leucemia. It went on to be performed over 1,800 times by 2012, and the characters have been featured in five other major plays and at least 300 radio and television segments.

In 2003, Las Marujitas took the play to Madrid theaters (where audiences had difficulty understanding the characters' regional dialects), and in August 2008 they began a series of performances throughout Ecuador to celebrate their twenty years on stage, becoming the theater group with the most performances in the country's history. The newspaper El Universo estimated that they had performed for 50% of the Ecuadorian population.

In 2018, after the death of Martha Ormaza, the surviving members put on Las Marujitas entre ineptos y tereques as a tribute to the actress.

== Characters ==
Cleta, Abrilia, and Encarna are three women of advanced age and medium-high social status that make up Las Dignas Damas del Comité (The Dignified Ladies of the Committee), a group that meets to discuss matters related to the organization of charities. In their meetings, the trio exchange experiences, fresh gossip, and talk with each other, trying to keep up appearances, although the objective of the meetings is often not specified due to the characters' lack of concentration.

The women were consistently played by the same actresses:

- Juana Guarderas as Abrilia, from Cuenca
- Martha Ormaza as Encarna, from Manabí
- Elena Torres as Cleta, from Quito

== Adaptations ==
Since the premiere of La Marujita se ha muerto con leucemia on November 7, 1990, its plotline and characters have been extended to other secondary works and segments in which the actresses make caricatured representations of the idiosyncrasies of certain Ecuadorian regions, using the techniques of gestural theater.

Both in the original play and its spin-offs, the three characters mainly touch on the theme of regionalism in Ecuador, provoking in the public the ability to laugh at themselves, their campanilismo (parochialism), and their inability to tolerate the country's ethnic and cultural diversity. The colloquialisms and body language of each region the characters come from were researched by the actresses, who were free to improvise changes to the script.

=== Spin-offs ===
In the 2006 spin-off Las Marujas Navideñas, the three women convene their committee to organize a Christmas gala, but they find themselves in trouble because they cannot complete their nativity scene, so they establish a comic game with the public to induce them to be part of it.

In Las Marujas Asambleístas, launched in 2007, the characters prepare for a patriotic event that turns out to be the launch of a political movement and their own candidacies for the Constituent Assembly. They form a strategy to finance the campaign and present their proposals, that range from the absurd to the realistic but irreverent.

In 2008, Las Marujas: ¡que viejas para verdes! premiered, which begins with Abrilia's nightmare about the end of the world, and which takes the trio of friends on a trip to observe the state of nature in the country and take measures to save it. The play seeks to look at Ecuadorian natural features from a new perspective in which the public is an active spectator of their powerful and delicate beauty, their natural wealth, and have a stake in their conservation.

2014's Las Marujas entre memorias y efemérides is an anthology of the best scenes of these three fictitious women, as well as situations and gags from their other theatrical pieces.

In 2018, Las Marujas entre ineptos y tereques was put on as a posthumous tribute to the actress Martha Ormaza, Encarna's portrayer, who had died that year.

== Creative team ==
The original team behind La Marujita se ha muerto con leucemia consisted of:

- Luis Miguel Campos – writer
- Guido Navarro – director
- Enrique Váscones, José Luis Celi, and Diego Rojas – scenography
- Carolina Váscones– choreography
- Tiziana Cipriani – costumes

== Plays ==
Title	Theater	First performance	Last performance	Ref.
La Marujita se ha muerto con leucemia	Patio de Comedias	1990	2015	
Las Marujas entretereques	Patio de Comedias	1995	2007	
Las Marujas navideñas	Patio de Comedias	2006	2015	
Las Marujas Asambleístas	Patio de Comedias	2007	2008	
Las Marujas: ¡que viejas para verdes!	Patio de Comedias	2008	2012	
Las Marujas entre memorias y efemérides	Patio de Comedias	2014	2015	
