= Kaizaad Kotwal =

Indian actor and women's rights activist

- Born: Mumbai, Maharashtra, India
- Education: Wabash College; Ohio State University
- Occupations: Actor; producer; writer; director
- Years active: 1999–present
- Known for: The Vagina Monologues, Indian production

Kaizaad Kotwal is an Indian producer, director, actor, writer and designer. He has worked on over 200 theatre and film productions, including the Indian production of the Vagina Monologues. He won an Emmy Award for Art Direction in 1996.

== Life and career ==
Kotwal was the first person to graduate with a triple major bachelor's degree from Wabash College in Indiana, USA. He also studied at Ohio State University where he received a master's degree in feminist and post-colonial literature, as well as a doctorate in new media and technology in art, film, and theatre.

== Activism ==
Kotwal co-owns a production company called Poor-Box Productions with his mother and co-director Mahabanoo Mody-Kotwal. Through this company, they began a long-running production of The Vagina Monologues in India, which debuted at the Prithvi Theatre in Mumbai in 2003. They have translated the play into Hindi and Gujarati. It has been performed consistently since then by actors like Dolly Thakore and Mona Ambegaonkar. Together, Kotwal and Mody-Kotwal founded the Make-A-Difference Foundation in 2008 to advocate for women's empowerment.

In 2014, he participated in the second annual Women of India Leadership Summit in New Delhi alongside other artists and women's rights activists.

In December 2018, Kotwal held a TED talk entitled "Art and the Accidental Activist".

In 2019, Kotwal and Mody-Kotwal were awarded the Karmaveer Puruskar Mahartna award for their activism for women's rights.

== Filmography ==
Year	Film	Role	Notes
1999	Simpatico	Arab businessman	
2000	Traffic	Teacher	
2003	Green Card Fever	Parvesh	
2014	Khoobsurat	Pritam Chakravorty	
2015	Phantom	Pakistan ambassador	
2016	Airlift	Behram Poonawalla	
2016	Udta Punjab		
2017	Raees	Mill Owner	
2018	2.0	Manoj Lulla	Tamil film
2019	Thinkistan	Visti Khodaji	Web series
2019	Fittrat	Teckchand Sareen	Web series released on ALTBalaji and ZEE5
2019	Kadakh	Kaizaad	
2020	Malang		
2020	High	Vikram Lohiya	2 episodes
2020	Bhaag Beanie Bhaag	Therapist	1 episode
2021	Flight	Mr. Rawat	
2021	Ray	Maneckjee	Web series released on Netflix
2022	Ek Villain Returns	Siya's Father	
2024	Raisinghani vs Raisinghani	Kersay	1 episode

== Awards and nominations ==
- 2012 - Karmaveer Chakra Award
- 2014- Verghese Kurian Karmaveer Puraskar
- 2019 - Karmaveer Puruskar Maharatna Award
- 2020- 2020 National Laadli Media Award for Gender Sensitivity
