= Danielle Matthews =

Australian singer and cabaret artist (born 1983)

Danielle Matthews (born 16 December 1983) is an Australian singer, musical theatre and cabaret artist who resides in Melbourne.

== Background ==
Matthews attended McKinnon Secondary College then studied Musical Theatre at The Victorian College of the Arts .

In 2009, Matthews became the inaugural winner of the prestigious Rob Guest Endowment Award.

She is best known for her portrayal of Shirley Bassey in the musical biopic Danielle Matthews sings The Songs of Shirley Bassey )

Other theatre credits include Urinetown The Musical, Showboat, Respect The Musical, Motor-mouth Loves Suck-face, An Evening with Stephen Sondheim, Respect the Musical (Australia Tour), TRIBE (Anthony Crowley).

Matthews has featured in various concert and television performances including Carols by Candlelight at the Myer Music Bowl, The Art Centre's Morning Melodies, The Helpmann Awards, The Circle, Good Morning Australia, Mornings with Kerri Anne and the Today Show.

Matthews has performed the Australian national anthem at the MCG for the opening of one day cricket test series.

In 2013, Matthews recorded her debut album Dream Song with Move Records and more recently, recorded La Belle Epoque for the in-game soundtrack to one of the world's most popular video game series – Assassin's Creed Unity.

Danielle performs and works closely with opera singer/ choral conductor and Australian of the year Dr Jonathon Welch and in 2019 became the Co Artistic Director of Aria, Logie and Helpmann award-winning The Choir of Hard Knocks.

She is currently performing as a Soul Singer in the Australian tour of Jesus Christ Superstar.

Danielle is managed by Mark Gogoll.
