= Théatre du Rêve Expérimental =

Théâtre du Rêve Expérimental (薪传实验剧团) is a Beijing-based performance group. It is dedicated to produce avant-garde performance. Its founder and artistic director is Wang Chong (王翀), an award-winning director and translator. He has studied and worked with directors Lin Zhaohua and Robert Wilson.

Since its founding, Théâtre du Rêve Expérimental has mounted 17 shows and has performed in China, Hong Kong, Taiwan, Japan, South Korea, U.S., Canada, U.K., the Netherlands and France. It is one of the most active touring companies from China and the youngest Chinese theatre group to tour internationally.

The Warfare of Landmine 2.0 won 2013 Festival/Tokyo Award.

== Style ==
The group does not limit its style to Eastern or Western theatre. Multi-media, performance art, and the harsh reality of Chinese society emerge on the stage altogether, creating a unique experience for the spectators.

== Productions ==
Title	Text	Time of Premiere	Tour
Constellations	Nick Payne	2014, Chinese language premiere	Beijing, Shanghai
Ghosts 2.0	Henrik Ibsen	2014, world premiere	Seoul, Beijing, Shanghai
The Warfare of Landmine 2.0	Wang Chong and Zhao Binghao	2013, world premiere	Tokyo, Hangzhou, Beijing, Shanghai, Tianjin
Kurukulla	Zhao Binghao	2013, world premiere	New York
Ibsen in One Take	Oda Fiskum after Henrik Ibsen	2012, world premiere	Beijing, Rotterdam, Guangzhou, Shanghai, Oslo, Adelaide
The Flowers on the Sea 2.0	Wang Chong after Han Bangqing	2012, world premiere	Shanghai
The Agony and the Ecstasy of Steve Jobs	Mike Daisey	2012, Chinese language premiere	Beijing, Shanghai, Suzhou, Wuxi, Taicang
The Chairs 2.0	Devised	2012, world premiere	Toga, Toyama, Beijing
Thunderstorm 2.0	Wang Chong after Cao Yu	2012, world premiere	Beijing, Taipei
Central Park West	Woody Allen	2011, Chinese language premiere	Beijing, Shenzhen, Hangzhou, Zhengzhou, Changsha, Ningbo, Shanghai, Taipei, Tianjin
Hamletmachine	Heiner Muller	2010, China mainland premiere	Beijing, Hangzhou, Avignon
The Peking OperaTION	N/A	2010, world premiere	Beijing, Shanghai
Crave	Sarah Kane	2009, China mainland premiere	Beijing
Self-accusation	Peter Handke	2009, China mainland premiere	Beijing, Hong Kong, Shenzhen, Shanghai, London
The Vagina Monologues	Eve Ensler	2009, China mainland premiere	Beijing, Shanghai, Shenzhen, Changsha, Hangzhou, Tianjin
e-Station	N/A	2008, world premiere	Beijing, New York, Quebec, Edinburgh, Shanghai

== See also ==
- Wang Chong
