= Wang Chong (director) =

Chinese theatremaker and filmmaker (born 1982)

- 王翀
- Born: January 8, 1982 (age 44); Beijing, China
- Known for: Theatre
- Awards: Festival/Tokyo Award, One Drama Award
- Website: www.theatrere.org

Wang Chong (王翀; born 8 January 1982) is an avant-garde theatre director and translator. His works have been performed in over 20 countries on 6 continents. Wang's Chinese experimental theatre includes multimedia performance and documentary theatre.

== Life ==
Wang graduated from Peking University with a degree in law and economics. Since then, he has studied theatre in China and the U.S., working with influential directors Lin Zhaohua and Robert Wilson.

In 2008, Wang Chong founded Théatre du Rêve Expérimental (薪传实验剧团), a Beijing-based performance group. It soon became one of the most active touring companies in China. His works include: The Warfare of Landmine 2.0, winning 2013 Festival/Tokyo Award; Lu Xun, noted by The Beijing News as The Best Chinese Performance of Year 2016; Teahouse 2.0, winning One Drama Award The Best Little Theater Performance of Year 2017; Thunderstorm 2.0, noted as one of The Best Ten Little Theatre Works in China, 1982-2012.

At the start of year 2016, Wang stopped using cellphone and social networks. He currently lives in The De-electrified Territory (TDT, or Ting Dian Ting), a self-designed Beijing apartment that has no electricity and no electronics.

== Theatre works ==
Title	Text	Time of Premiere	Tour
Asia Weeks	Yannic Han Biao Federer	2026, world premiere	Heidelberg
Lying Flat 2.0	Wang Chong and ChatGPT	2024, world premiere	Wuzhen, Beijing, Notre Dame
Made in China 2.0	Wang Chong	2023, world premiere	Boston, Melbourne, Groningen, Dar es Salaam, Adelaide, Penang, Phnom Penh, Hamilton, Puebla, Havana, Pereira, Berlin, Cologne, Jakarta, Aarhus
Being and Time 2.0	Ma Chuyi	2021, world premiere	Guangzhou, Foshan
Waiting for Godot	Samuel Beckett	2020, online premiere	Actors at Wuhan, Beijing, Datong
The Insane Asylum Next to Heaven	Nick Yu	2019	Shanghai
On Where Do We Come From, What Are We, Where Are We Going 2.0	Ma Chuyi	2019, world premiere	Beijing, Wuzhen, Modena, Cagliari
Kiss Kiss Bang Bang 2.0	Wang Chong	2017, world premiere	Tokyo
As the Sparrow Wended in A Windless Winter	Zhao Binghao	2017, world premiere	Tokyo
Teahouse 2.0	Lao She	2017, world premiere	Beijing
Little Emperors	Lachlan Philppot	2017, world premiere	Melbourne
Lu Xun	Li Jing	2016, world premiere	Beijing, Shaoxing, Hangzhou, Shanghai
Constellations	Nick Payne	2015, Chinese language premiere	Beijing, Xi'an, Suzhou, Chongqing, Shanghai, Wuzhen, Groningen, New York, Macau, Foshan
Revolutionary Model Play 2.0	Zhao Binghao	2015, world premiere	Singapore
Stories from Unofficial China	Gritt Uldall-Jessen	2015, world premiere	Helsingor
Ghosts 2.0	Henrik Ibsen	2014, world premiere	Seoul, Beijing, Tokyo, Taoyuan, Taipei, Shanghai, Groningen
The Warfare of Landmine 2.0	Wang Chong and Zhao Binghao	2013, world premiere	Tokyo, Hangzhou, Beijing, Shanghai
Kurukulla	Zhao Binghao	2013, world premiere	New York
Ibsen in One Take	Oda Fiskum after Henrik Ibsen	2012, world premiere	Beijing, Rotterdam, Guangzhou, Shanghai, Oslo, Adelaide
The Flowers on the Sea 2.0	Wang Chong after Han Bangqing	2012, world premiere	Shanghai
The Agony and the Ecstasy of Steve Jobs	Mike Daisey	2012, Chinese language premiere	Beijing, Shanghai, Suzhou, Wuxi, Taicang
The Chairs 2.0	Devised	2012, world premiere	Toga, Beijing
Thunderstorm 2.0	Wang Chong and Liang Anzheng after Cao Yu	2012, world premiere	Beijing, Taipei, Jerusalem, New York
Central Park West	Woody Allen	2011, Chinese language premiere	Beijing, Shenzhen, Hangzhou, Zhengzhou, Changsha, Ningbo, Shanghai, Taipei, Tianjin
Hamletmachine	Heiner Muller	2010, China mainland premiere	Beijing, Hangzhou, Avignon
The Peking OperaTION	Devised	2010, world premiere	Beijing, Shanghai
Crave	Sarah Kane	2009, China mainland premiere	Beijing
Self-accusation	Peter Handke	2009, China mainland premiere	Beijing, Hong Kong, Shenzhen, Shanghai, London
The Vagina Monologues	Eve Ensler	2009, China mainland premiere	Beijing, Shanghai, Shenzhen, Changsha, Hangzhou, Tianjin
e-Station	Devised	2008, world premiere	Beijing, New York, Quebec, Edinburgh, Shanghai
The Arabian Night	Roland Schimmelpfennig	2007, Chinese language premiere	Beijing
Hamletism	William Shakespeare	2006, world premiere	Honolulu, Beijing

== Translations ==
Plays:

- Hamletmachine by Heiner Muller
- Crave by Sarah Kane
- The Vagina Monologues by Eve Ensler
- The Agony and the Ecstasy of Steve Jobs by Mike Daisey
- Constellations by Nick Payne
- The Heretic by Richard Bean
- Electronic City by Falk Richter
- The Arabian Night by Roland Schimmelpfennig
- Miss Julie by Katie Mitchell after August Strindberg and Inger Christensen
- Father's Braid by Amnon Levy and Rami Danon
- Ibsen in One Take by Oda Fiskum (co-translation)
- Tokyo Notes by Hirata Oriza (co-translation)
- The Bedbug by Meng Jinghui (from Chinese into English)

Other:

- The Empty Space by Peter Brook
- The Writer's Journey: Mythic Structure For Writers by Christopher Vogler
- "Theatre at Its Age of Acceleration" by Thomas Ostermeier

== Awards and honors ==
- One Drama Award for Best Little Theater Performance of Year 2017 (Teahouse 2.0)
- Best Chinese Production of Year 2016 (Lu Xun), The Beijing News
- Festival/Tokyo Award (The Warfare of Landmine 2.0), 2013
- Asian Cultural Council Fellowship, 2013
- Experimental Artist of the Year, The Beijing News, 2012
- Jury Award, Asian Theatre Directors’ Festival (Chairs 2.0), 2012
- Nomination for Best Production (e-Station), Mont-Laurier International Theatre Festival, 2009
- Han Suyin Award for Young Translators, Translators Association of China, 2007

== See also ==
- Théatre du Rêve Expérimental
