= Enchufe.tv =

- Genre: Comedy; Black comedy Surreal humor Sketches
- Created by: Martín Domínguez, Christian Moya, Leonardo Robalino, Jorge Ulloa
- Directed by: Jorge Ulloa, Christian Moya, Orlando Herrera, Juan Aguilar, Daniel Enríquez
- Country of origin: Ecuador
- Original language: Spanish
- No. of seasons: 11

Production
- Executive producer: Fabienne Fourquet Bastian Manintveld Arturo Yépez
- Producer: Juan Carlos Flor
- Running time: 3-5 minutes per sketch
- Production company: 2bLatam

Original release
- Network: YouTube
- Release: November 13, 2011 – present

Enchufe.tv is a comedy entertainment brand originated in Ecuador produced by 2btube Latin America. With production based in Quito, Ecuador and Mexico City, Mexico, it consists of comedic sketches viewed primarily on its YouTube channel, its Facebook page, TikTok and Instagram as well as on television channels and AVOD platforms in Latin America and in the U.S.

As of June 2026, their YouTube channel has nearly 30 million subscribers, their Facebook page over 19 million, their Instagram account more than 4 million and their TikTok page over 11 million followers. Their total social media reach is more than 60 million.

Enchufe.tv is also watched as season compilations in Latin America and the U.S. in Teleamazonas, TNT, Pluto.tv, Vix, Canela.tv and other local TV channels and AVOD platforms.

== History ==
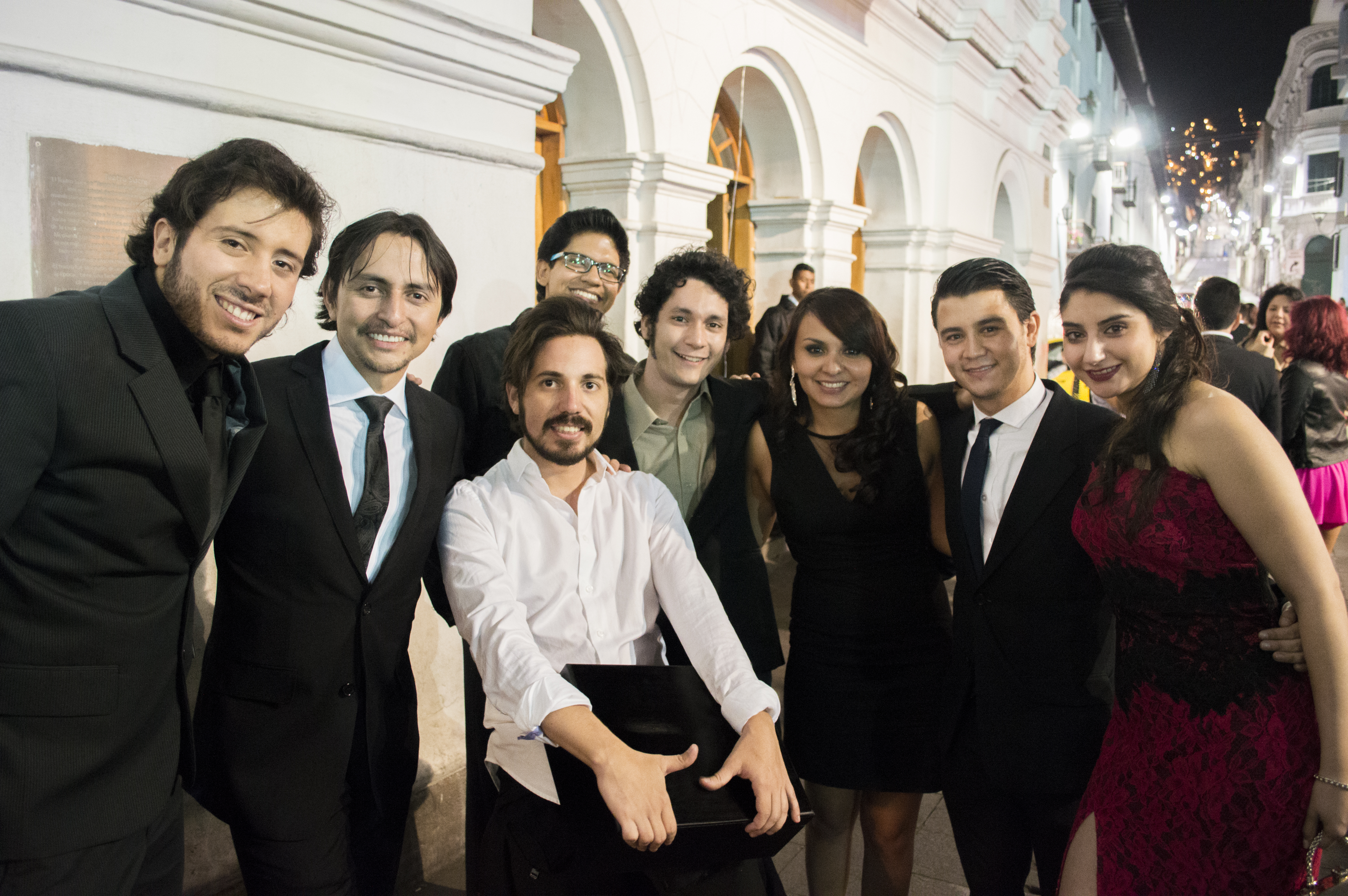
Part of the cast of Enchufe.tv in 2015

In 2011, four Ecuadorian film students: Leonardo Robalino, Christian Moya, Martín Domínguez and Jorge Ulloa discussed the current state of audiovisual production in Ecuador in the back of a pickup truck. As a result, and after being rejected by every TV station in their home country, they decided to produce short videos, using the internet as their primary medium of exhibition with fewer restrictions than traditional media outlets.

Shortly, they created their production company, Touché Films, and on November 13, 2011, the Enchufe.tv YouTube channel was created, airing several comedy sketches, El peor casting (The Worst Casting) being its first.

During its first season, sketches between 4 and 5 minutes long were uploaded every Sunday, while shorts known as "microYAPA" (between 10 and 60 seconds) were uploaded on Tuesdays. Every Thursday a "Promo" was released, providing a preview of the upcoming Sunday sketch.

By July 2012, the Enchufe.tv YouTube channel reached 71,000 subscribers and their videos received over 78 million views, racking up 500,000 hits per day making them the most popular Ecuadorian YouTube channel on the web. Until mid-2012, viewership came primarily from Ecuador, followed by Mexico. On April 16, 2012, the protagonist of Pescador, Andrés Crespo, made a guest appearance in the skit with Las Amigas de Camilo con Blanquito. On May 13, 2012, the Mothers Day video Mami, mami, mami, reached a record of 3.2 million visitors. On July 23, 2012, Enchufe.tv aired a video called ME GUSTA, reaching 1.5 million views in less than 48 hours and inspiring approximately 100 video responses, becoming a trending video from Russia to the United States. On October 8, 2012, the Compra Condones sketch was released, eventually becoming the most viral video released by the channel, reaching over 10 million views to date.

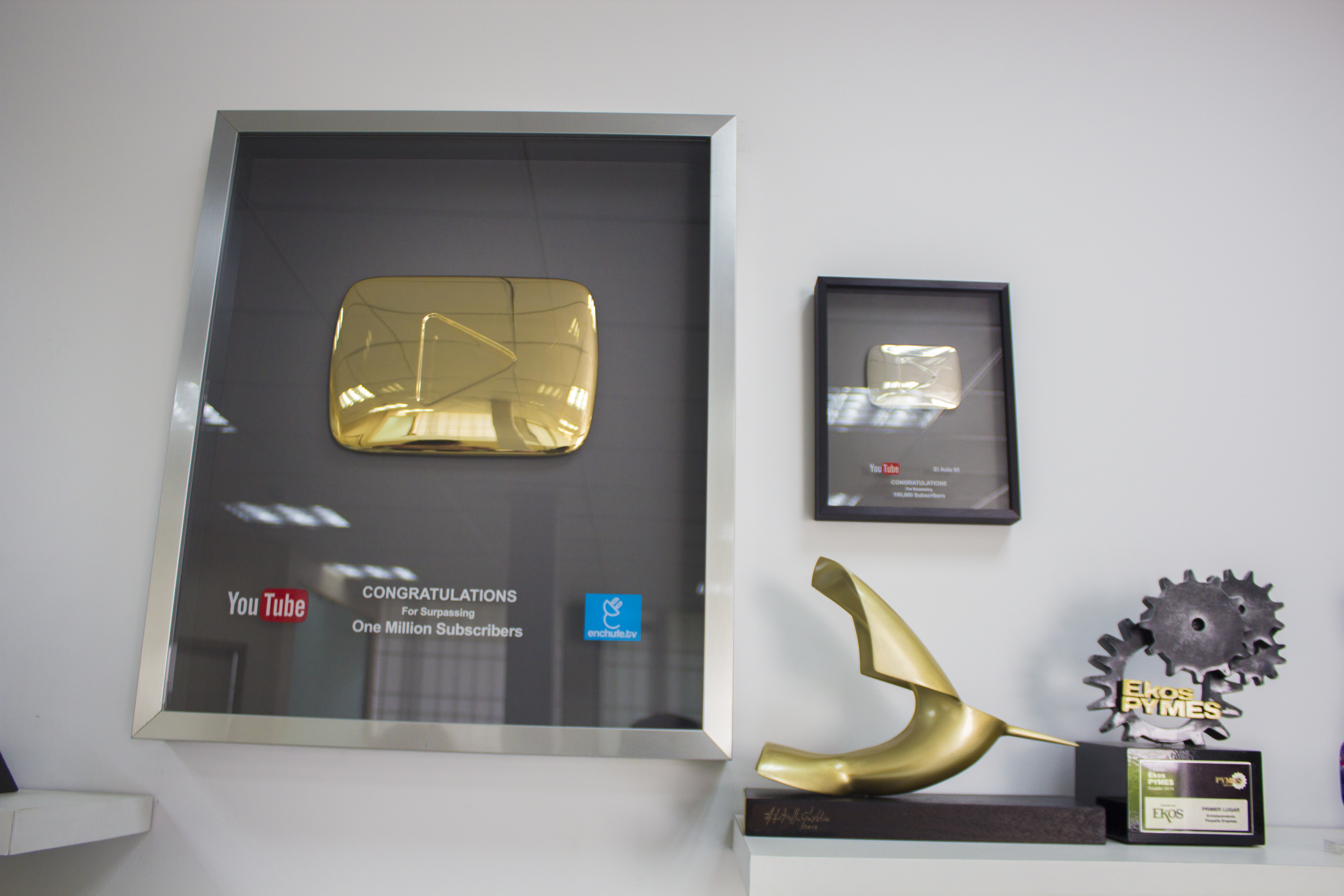
YouTube Golden Play for Enchufe.tv to reach the first million subscribers along with several awards.

In September 2013, Enchufe.tv aired its first season (compilation of sketches) reaching a broader Ecuadorian audience on Ecuavisa, an Ecuadorian television station. By then they already had more than seven million subscribers and 1 million daily visits, as well as 1 million "likes" on Facebook. According to data analysis provided by different platforms, by December, 2022 their largest online audience is in Mexico, followed by Ecuador, Colombia, Peru and Bolivia.

On November 3, 2013, YouTube awarded Enchufe.tv a Golden Play Award, attributed to YouTube channels with over 1 million subscribers on the occasion of the first YouTube Music Awards.

On September 7, 2014, Enchufe.tv won the "Audience Choice Show of the Year" award at the Streamy Awards.

On December 9, 2015, Enchufe.tv made a cameo in YouTube Rewind 2015. and in 2016, Encufe.tv made their second YouTube Rewind appearance in YouTube Rewind 2016.

== Genre and Style ==
The sketches feature Latin American idiosyncrasies, reflecting on everyday life while leaving aside stereotypes and discrimination. Their stories are based on the ironies of personal experiences, popular sayings, traditions, family and couple relationships and parodies of pop culture among others, resulting in a very comical mix that appeals to a wide audience.

== Notable sketches ==
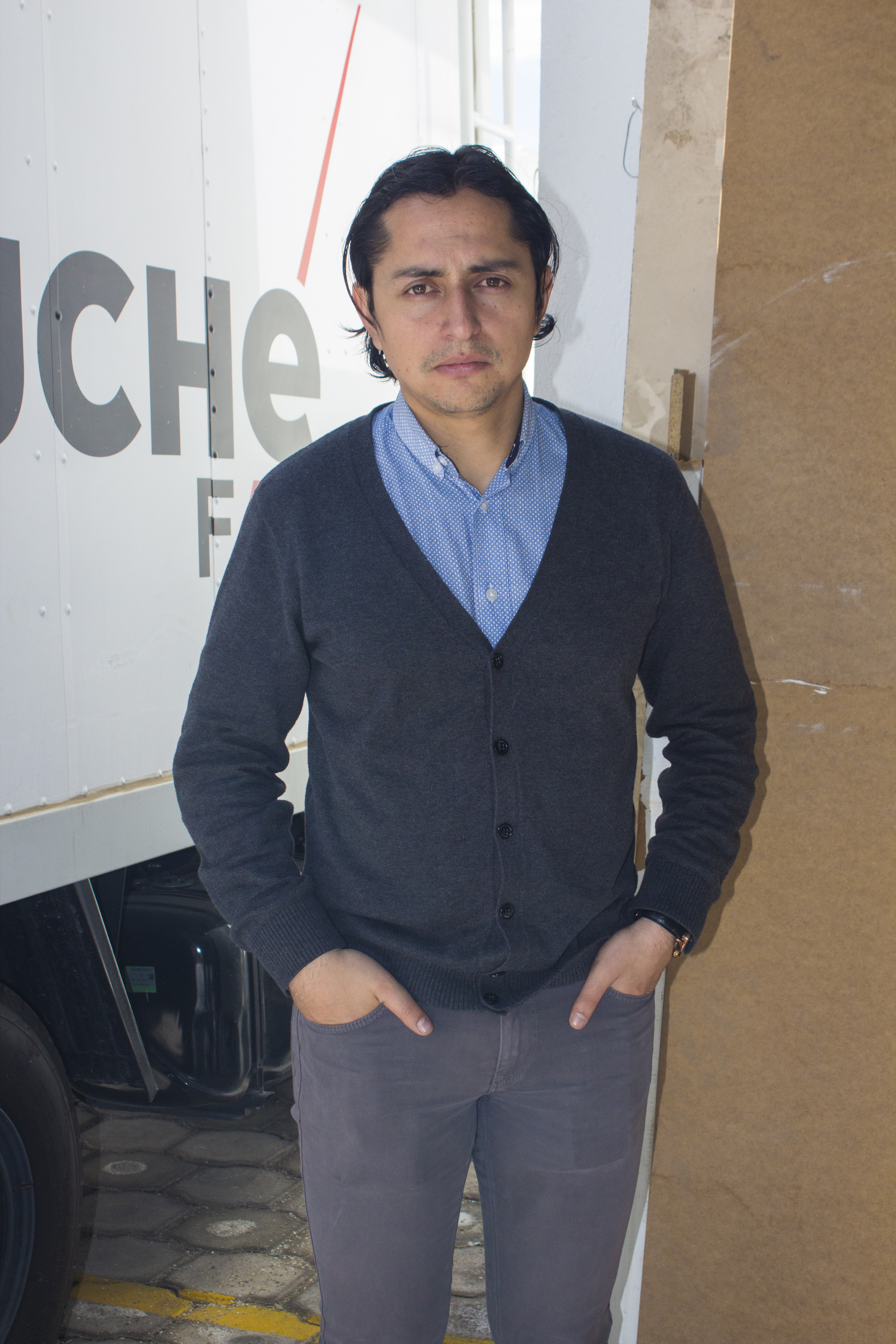
Orlando Herrera.

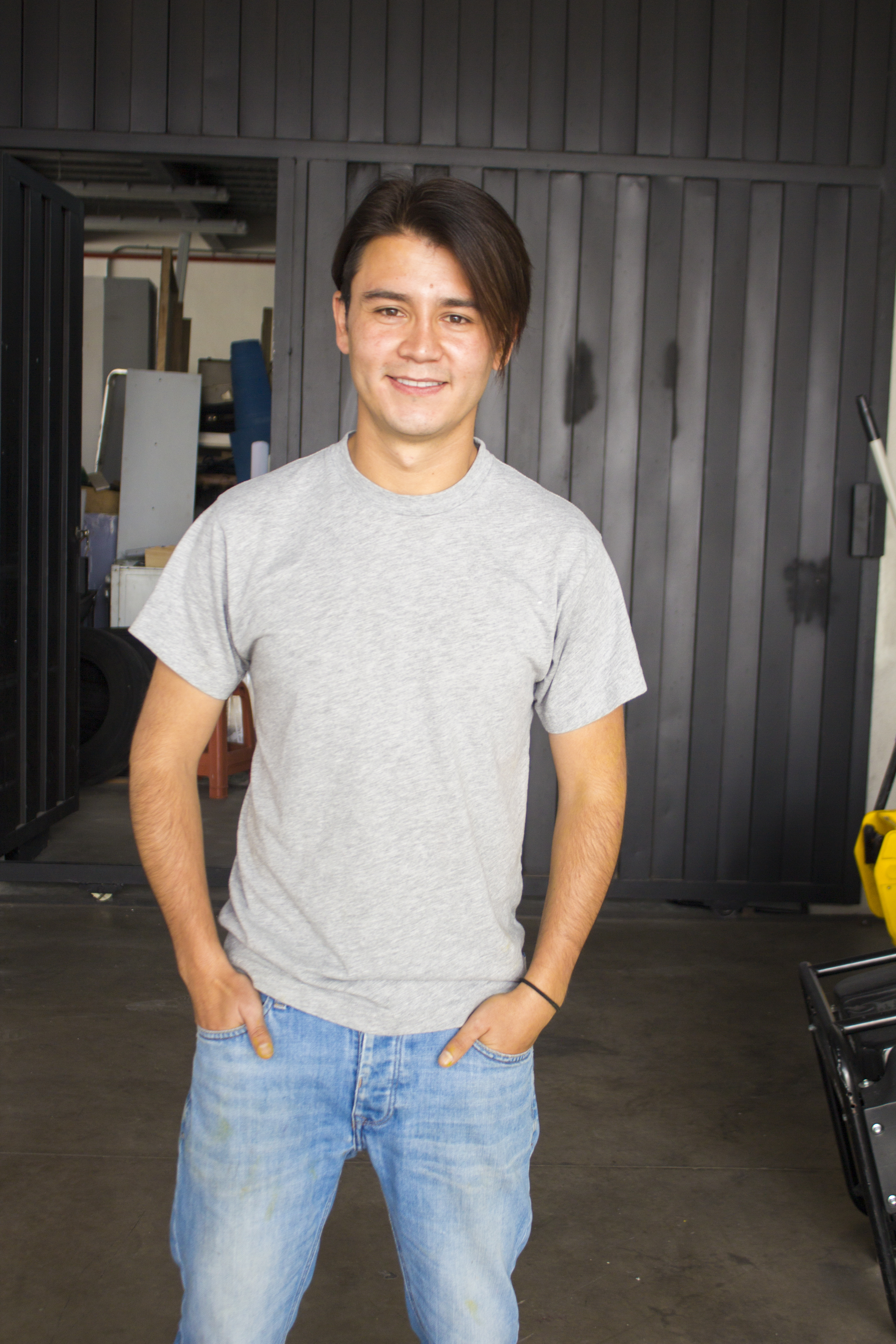
Raúl Santana.

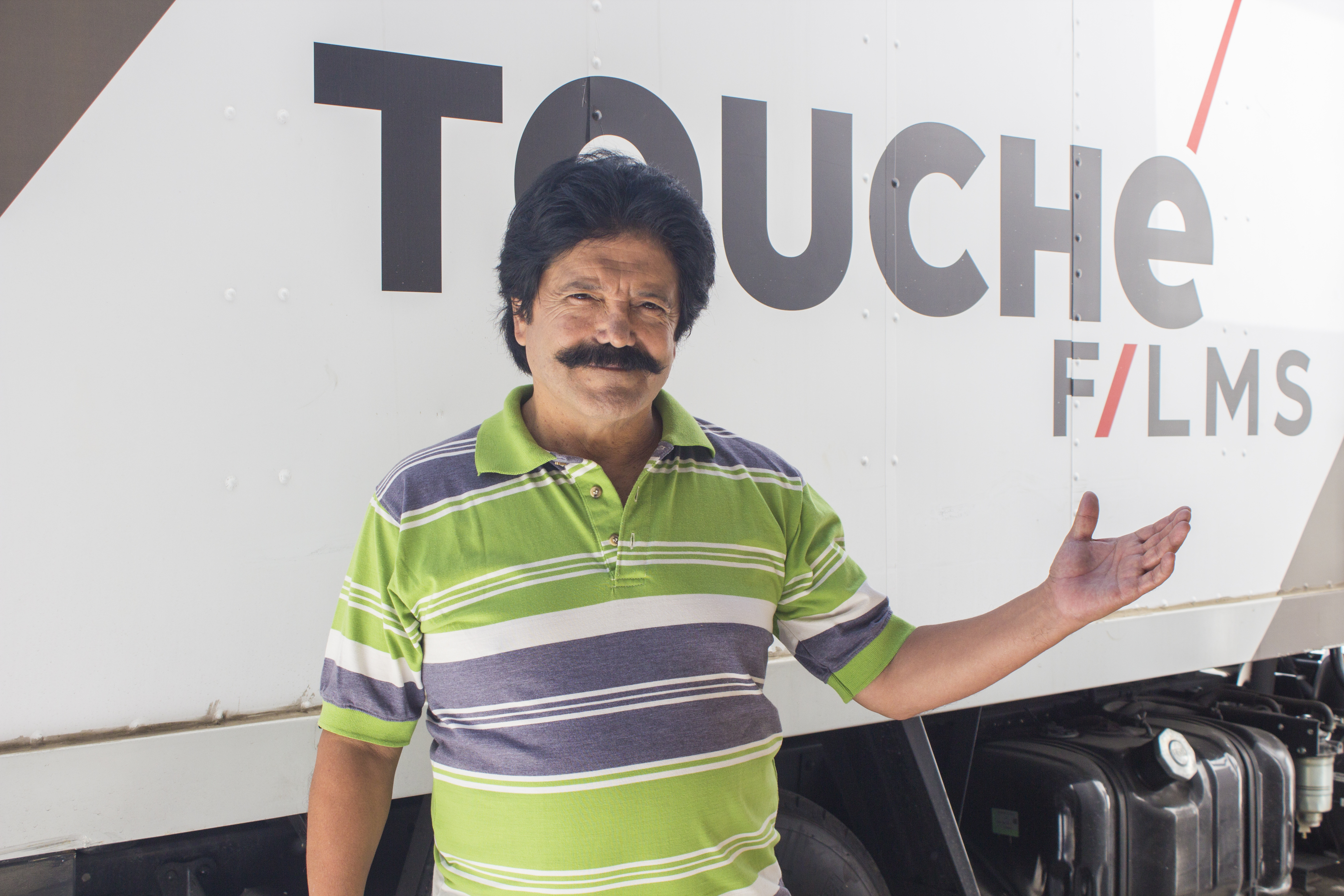
Mosquito Mosquero

1. The Worst Casting: The first sketch Touché Films ever made for Enchufe.tv. It is about the unique situations that casting presents.
2. Mission: Carnaval (Ecuadorian FPS): In this parody of the first person shooter video game, Call of Duty, using the national holiday of carnaval as the backdrop, water balloons, eggs, flour and water pistols are used in place of firearms to attack passers by.
3. Mommy mommy mommy (Mother's Day): This sketch is about a mother who can't stand her annoying son with his non-stop questioning about everything, in addition to his bad grades. During an attempt to trap and punish him, he gives her a Mother's Day card reminding her that he loves her. The sketch ends with a hug between mother and son.
4. Camilo's amigas with Blanquito: Three rowdy teenage girls try to socialize with local celebrity Andrés Crespo, who plays the protagonist Blanquito of the Ecuadorian film "Pescador" while riding in his car. They get him into trouble with the authorities by having alcohol in his car and drinking underage. The sketch ends with a session of selfies during Crespo's arrest.
5. ME GUSTA: This is the first video to step outside of the normal structure of the average Enchufe.tv sketch. In this video whenever someone likes a particular thing or situation they are ambushed by a character with the well-known meme rage comic ME GUSTA face in place of their head. This character is always accompanied by the same song, and after spitting on a normal person's face with the rage comic LOL face, the normal person is transformed into the same kind of ME GUSTA character as the original one from the beginning of the video. After the transformation they both dance in the same peculiar manner. At the end a lady who happens to be cooking hits the ME GUSTA guy on the head with a pan after she expresses her liking of what she was doing. The ME GUSTA guy is left on the floor with blood on his face.
6. Buying Condoms: Chichico, a young man who goes to the pharmacy somewhat shamefully, needs to buy condoms for the first time. Although he attempts to do so cautiously, it seems as if everyone around him becomes aware of and involved in what he is attempting to buy, including his uncle who happens to be there too. It turns out that he is the millionth customer that day, and a camera crew broadcasts his purchase nationwide. His girlfriend's father sees the broadcast, and forbids his daughter from seeing Chichico further. When he shamefully returns to the car to give his friend the condoms he had asked for, the friend replies that he asked not for condoms, or "condones" in Spanish, but for "cordones" (Spanish for shoelaces), thus the entire affair could have been averted if not for a tragic misunderstanding.
7. Trailer, Chavo the Movie: This sketch is a parody trailer for a fake movie spinoff based on the Mexican sitcom El Chavo. It is also a tribute to the show's star/creator Chespirito (Roberto Gómez Bolaños). It has a similar plot to The Da Vinci Code. The sketch features two agents, one American and the other Middle Eastern. The agents are searching for the real name of El Chavo. The trailer also briefly explores the darker and perhaps more sexual sides of the beloved sitcom characters. The trailer ends with the American agent discovering Gómez Bolaños' other character El Chapulín Colorado's classic squeaky hammer in the desert.

== Production ==
Enchufe.tv´s General Manager is Arturo Yepez, its creative director is Jorge Ulloa, and the show is produced by 2btube Latin America, part of 2btube.

== Awards ==
- Golden Play from YouTube Music Awards 2013 for became reach to the 1 million subscribers.
- Audience Choice Show of the Year from Streamy Awards 2014 for audience vote.

=== Cast ===
- Diego Ulloa
- Orlando Herrera
- Carolina Pérez
- Raúl Santana
- Jorge Ulloa
- Leonardo Robalino
- Nataly Valencia
- Daniel Paez
- Andrés Arteaga
- Carla Yépez
- Esteban Jaramillo
- Francisco Viñachi
- Jorge Alejandro Fegan
- Maya Villacreses
- Mosquito Mosquera
- Christoph Baumann
- Erika Russo
- Alejandro Lalaleo (screenwriter)
