= Juana Guarderas =

Juana Guarderas Albuja
- Born: 24 June 1964 (age 61); Quito
- Occupation: Actress

Juana Guarderas Albuja (born 24 June 1964) is an Ecuadorian theatre, cinema, and television actress. She has been the director of the Quito Comedy Club since 1990.

== Biography ==
Juana Guarderas was born in Quito on 24 June 1964, the daughter of Raúl Guarderas Guarderas and María del Carmen Albuja, and lived in Machachi, Ecuador for 11 years. She began acting at age 17 in the Comedy Club of Quito production of La lección de la Luna. Guarderas would study theatre in the United States of America. She would appear in plays such as Las Marujitas, Monólogos de la Vagina, Diario íntimo de una adolescente, and the films Entre Marx y una Mujer Desnuda (adaption from the novel), Un titán en el ring, Sé que vienen a matarme y María, and llena eres de gracia. Guarderas also played in the TV sitcom Dejémonos de vainas, and now appears as part of a YouTube comedy project, Enchufe TV.

Guarderas is the mother of two children. She is also the vice president of the Association of Theater Workers, and a member of the Assembly of Artists of Ecuador.

She has been awarded the José Martínez Queirolo Award from the House of Ecuadorian Culture and Revista Hogar's Rosa de Plata award.
