= Aburrá Valley =

Geographic area in Colombia

Coordinates: 6.2319°N 75.5681°W

Political division of the Aburrá Valley (in dark gray, the urban areas of The Metropolitan Area of the Aburrá Valley).

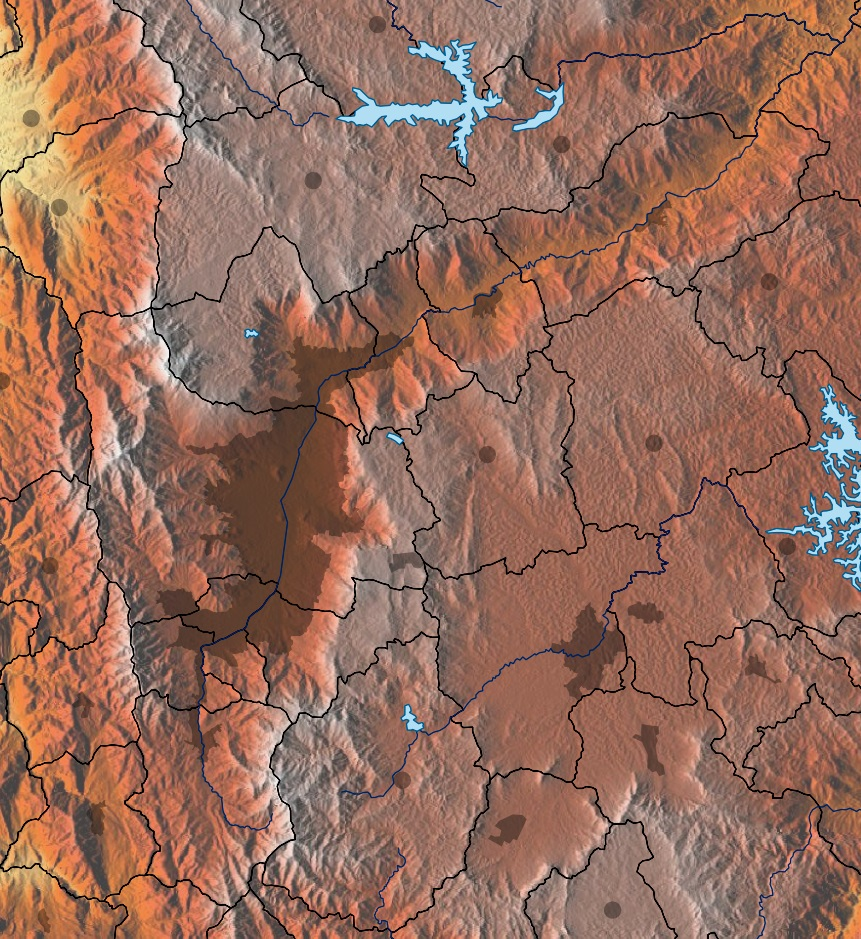
Topographic map of the Aburrá Valley.

Aburrá Valley (in Spanish Valle de Aburrá) is the natural river basin of the Medellín River and one of the most populous valleys of Colombia in its Andean Region with near 4 million inhabitants in its biggest urban agglomeration: The Metropolitan Area of the Aburrá Valley. The valley is located on the Central Range, over the Antioquian Mountain just between the Magdalena and Cauca valleys from east to west. The name "Aburrá" comes from an ancient language spoken in the place by the "Aburreans" (Aburraes) before the Spaniards settled the place during the 16th century.

The valley is oriented from south to north being the south the highest level and the north the low level. The altitudes of the mountains around the valley (west and east mountains), can reach up to 3,100 m (10,200 ft) above the sea level (Padre Amaya Peak). The lowest level is 1,300 m (4,300 ft) above sea level. From its north natural limit to its southern part, the valley is 60 km (37 mi) long, while there are several varieties in its width being the wider part the one that corresponds to the municipality of Medellín with 8–10 km (5.0–6.2 mi) and the narrowest the part that corresponds to the municipality of Copacabana with 3 km (1.9 mi).

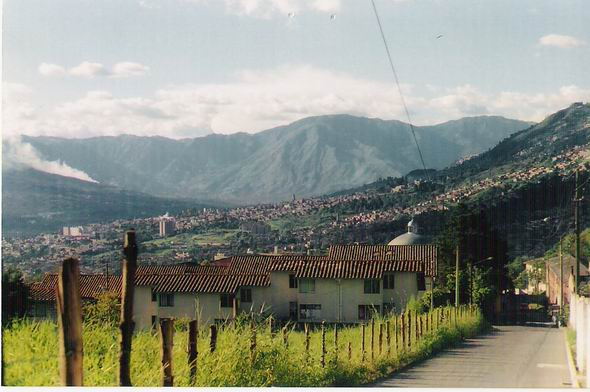
A northern view of the Aburrá Valley from Barrio Buenos Aires, Medellín.

== History ==
=== Prehistory ===
There is archaeological evidence of human habitation in the Aburrá Valley for the past 10,500 years. Spanish conquerors encountered groups there such as the Aburrá, Yamesí, Pequé, Ebejico, Norisco, and Maní—which were in the Valley since about the 5th century. The Valley's name stems from previous habitation by the Aburrá, who engaged in agriculture (growing maize, beans, and cotton), textile weaving and decoration, commercialization of salt, and goldsmithing. Under Spanish rule the Aburrá lost possession of the land and were relegated to working in mines and other feudalist systems. Sickness brought by the Europeans, heavy work, and mistreatment led to their extinction at least from the Valley. Descendants of peoples who inhabited the Valley in ancient times can be found today in other regions of the Antioquia State such as Urabá and the West and South regions.

=== Spanish settlement ===
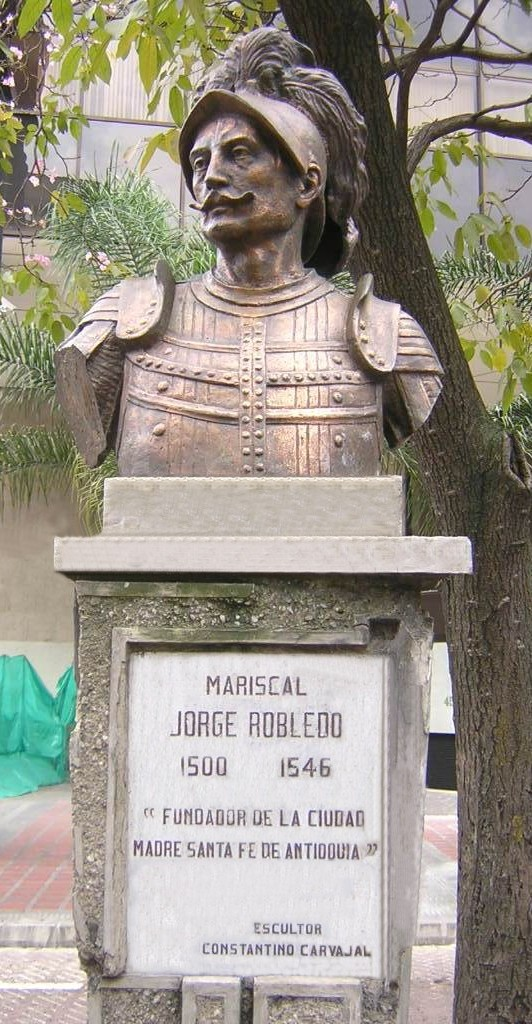
Marshal Jorge Robledo.

In August 1541 Marshal Jorge Robledo was in what is today Heliconia, when he saw at the distant what he thought was a valley. He sent Jerónimo Luis Tejelo to explore the territory and Tejelo arrived during the night of August 23 to a plain field. The Spaniards gave the name of Valley of Saint Bartholomew that was to be changed for the Aboriginal one of Aburrá that is translated as the "Painters" due to the textile decorations of the natives. However, the conquerors did not feel attracted by the valley due to the lack of wealth and the bellicosity of the Aboriginal people.

In 1574 Gaspar de Rodas asked to the Antioquia's Cabildo four miles of land to establish herds and food stays in the valley. The Cabildo granted three miles.

In 1616 the Colonial Visitor Francisco de Herrera y Campuzano founded a settlement with 80 aborigines naming it "Poblado de San Lorenzo" in what is today "Barrio El Poblado|El Poblado Square". In 1646 a Colonial law ordered the separation of aborigines from mestizos and mulattos and for this reason the colonial administration began the construction of a new town in Aná, where is today the Centro de Medellín|Berrio Square and where it was built a place called Nuestra Señora de la Candelaria de Aná (Our Lady of Candelaria of Aná). Three years after they started the construction of the Iglesia La Candelaria de Medellín|Minor Basilica of Our Lady of Candelaria, rebuilt at the end of the 18th century.

=== The development of Medellín ===
In 1674 Medellín became the provincial capital of Antioquia. The new provincial capital would become during the next years the hub of development in the valley. The new city was located until the 19th century in what was known as El Sitio de Aná (nowadays the La Candelaria, Medellín|Berrio Square along the Santa Elena Creek and the Medellín River). Places like El Poblado, Barrio La América, Barrio Robledo, Barrio Manrique, were just rural townships. Other towns like Envigado and Bello were very small villages.

During the first part of the 20th century Medellín would start its industrial revolution attracting a great number of farmers from different regions of Antioquia. The small provincial capital became an overpopulated city by the 1960s with more than 1 million inhabitants. This had a direct effect over the other villages in the Aburrá Valley: many of them were integrated in the growing city like Robledo, La América, La Floresta, El Poblado, Manrique and others became themselves cities to be a part of The Metropolitan Area of the Aburrá Valley by the 1970s.

== The Aburran cities ==
The Aburrá Valley has ten cities within its mountains:

- Barbosa, located in the lowest level of the Valley.
- Bello, the second most populous city after Medellín.
- Caldas, located in the highest level of the valley.
- Copacabana, the narrowest part of the valley.
- Girardota
- Envigado
- Itagüí
- Sabaneta
- Medellín, the flattest, widest and most populous part of the valley.
- La Estrella

== Description ==
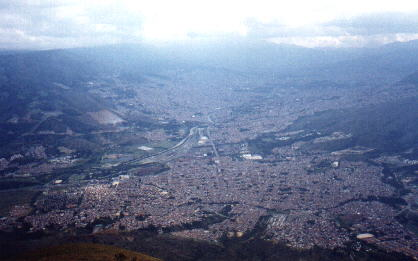
The Aburrá Valley from the Quitasol Mountain in Bello.

All the flat areas of the valley are completely populated. The majority of the people live in Medellín and the density is less toward the south and toward the north. The Central Range makes two branches to form the valley and it is crossed by the Medellín River that has its beginning in Caldas and ends in the Porce River.
