= Bello, Antioquia =

Bello Bello
- Municipality and City
- Municipality of Bello
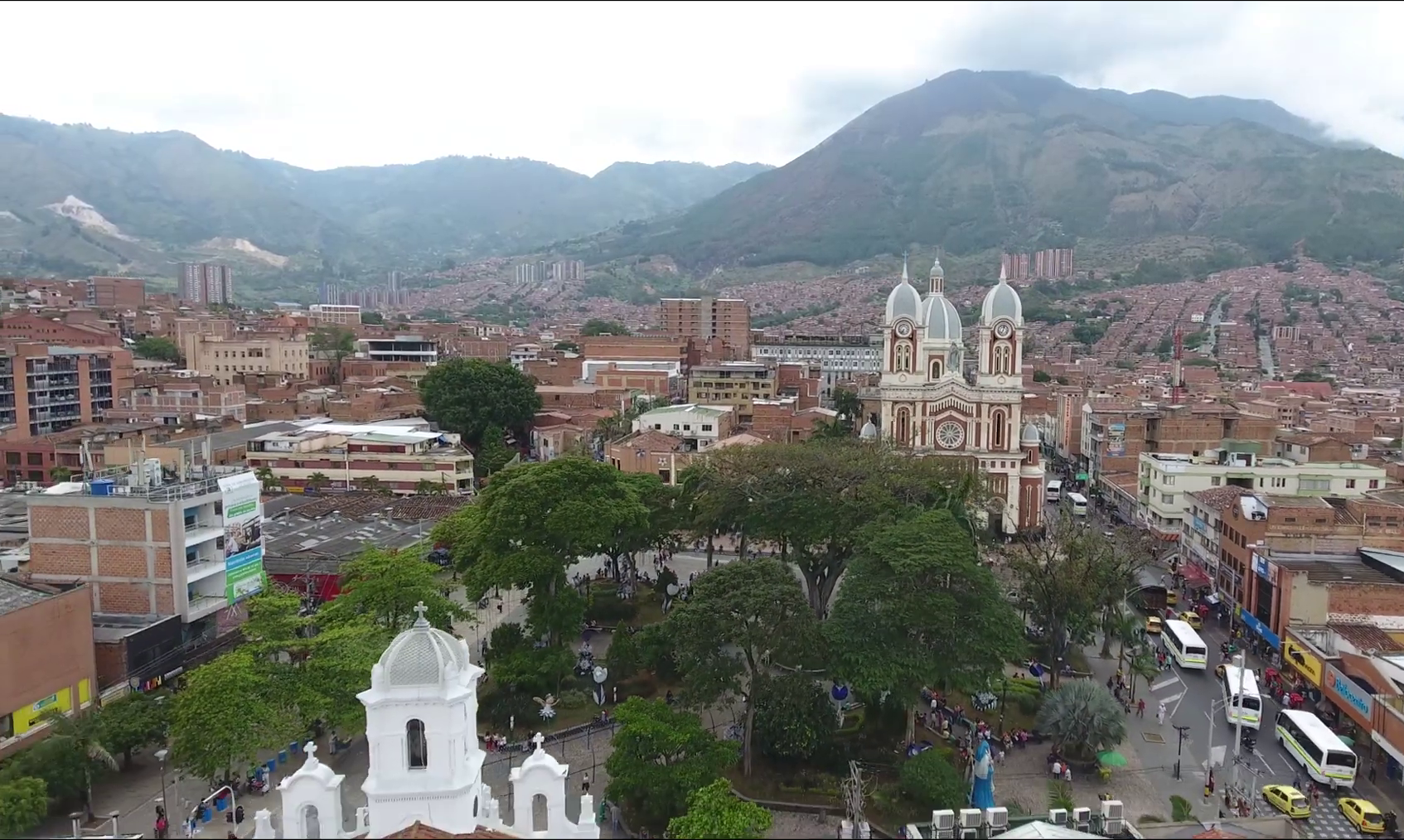
- Center of the city

- Flag Coat of arms
- Nicknames: Marco Fidel Suárez's Cradle Artist's City Cacique Niquia's Empire
- Motto: City of progress
- Anthem: Himno de Bello (Bello's Anthem)
- Location of the municipality and town of Bello, Antioquia in the Antioquia Department of Colombia

- Location in Colombia
- Coordinates: 6°20′N 75°34′W
- Country: Colombia
- Founded: 1676
- Founder: Gaspar de Rodas
- Named for: Andrés Bello

Government
  - Mayor: Lorena Gónzales Ospina 2024-2027

Area
  - Municipality and City: 147.8 km^{2} (57.1 sq mi)
  - Urban: 22.07 km^{2} (8.52 sq mi)
- Elevation: 1,310 m (4,300 ft)

Population (2018)
  - Municipality and City: 481.901
  - Estimate (2024): 588.462
  - Density: 3.260/km^{2} (8.445/sq mi)
  - Urban: 562.880
  - Urban density: 25.50/km^{2} (66.06/sq mi)
  - Metro: 3,312,165
- Demonym: Bellanita
- Time zone: UTC-5 (Colombia Standard Time)
- Area code: 57 +
- Website: Official website (in Spanish)

Bello (Spanish pronunciation: [ˈbeʎo], [ˈbeʝo]) is a city and municipality in Antioquia Department, Colombia and a suburb of Medellín, the department capital. Bello is part of the Metropolitan Area of the Aburrá Valley in the department of Antioquia. It is bordered on the north by the municipality of San Pedro de los Milagros, on the east by the municipality of Copacabana, on the south by the municipality of Medellín and on the west by the municipalities of Medellín and San Jerónimo.

It is the center of the development in the north of the Aburrá Valley (Spanish: Valle de Aburrá), and as a member of the Metropolitan Area of Aburrá Valley, or AMVA (Spanish: Área Metropolitana del Valle de Aburrá), some public services are regulated for the Metropolitan Area. There are several nicknames for the municipality: Imperio del Cacique Niquia (Cacique Niquia's Empire), Cuna de Marco Fidel Suárez ("Marco Fidel Suárez's cradle"), "Ciudad de los artistas" ("Artist's city").

== History ==
Meaning "Beautiful" in English, Bello was founded in 1676 as "Hato Viejo". The department later changed its name to Bello in honor of Latin American polymath Andrés Bello (1781–1865). Bello was granted municipal status in 1913, officially making it one of the cities of Antioquia Department.

Bello is also known as the "City of Artists" in Colombia. Its current mayor is Lorena Gonzáles Ospina.

In July 1541, troops under the command of Jerónimo Luis Tejelo (Deputy Marshal to Jorge Robledo) found the wide valley of Los Aburrá inhabited by indigenous farmers who had "a habitat organized in groups with scattered houses, forming clusters of houses". This was especially true in the town of Niquías, which occupied the territory now called Bello.

In 1574, the Spanish subject Gaspar de Rodas requested a land grant for the Aburrá Valley from the town hall of Santa Fe de Antioquia in order to establish therein "herds of livestock and agricultural plots", in order to provide food for the conquest. He was awarded the territories from the hill or "Asientos viejos de Aburrá" – an area which is now occupied by the Medellín town center – down, including the Niquía territory. In 1576, the captain of Rodas came to exercise control over the area from the Spanish Crown, permitting the use of the territory for corrals, ranches and flocks. From 1613 onward, the area began to be called Hatoviejo instead of Hato de Rodas or Hato de Aburrá to distinguish it from later herds.

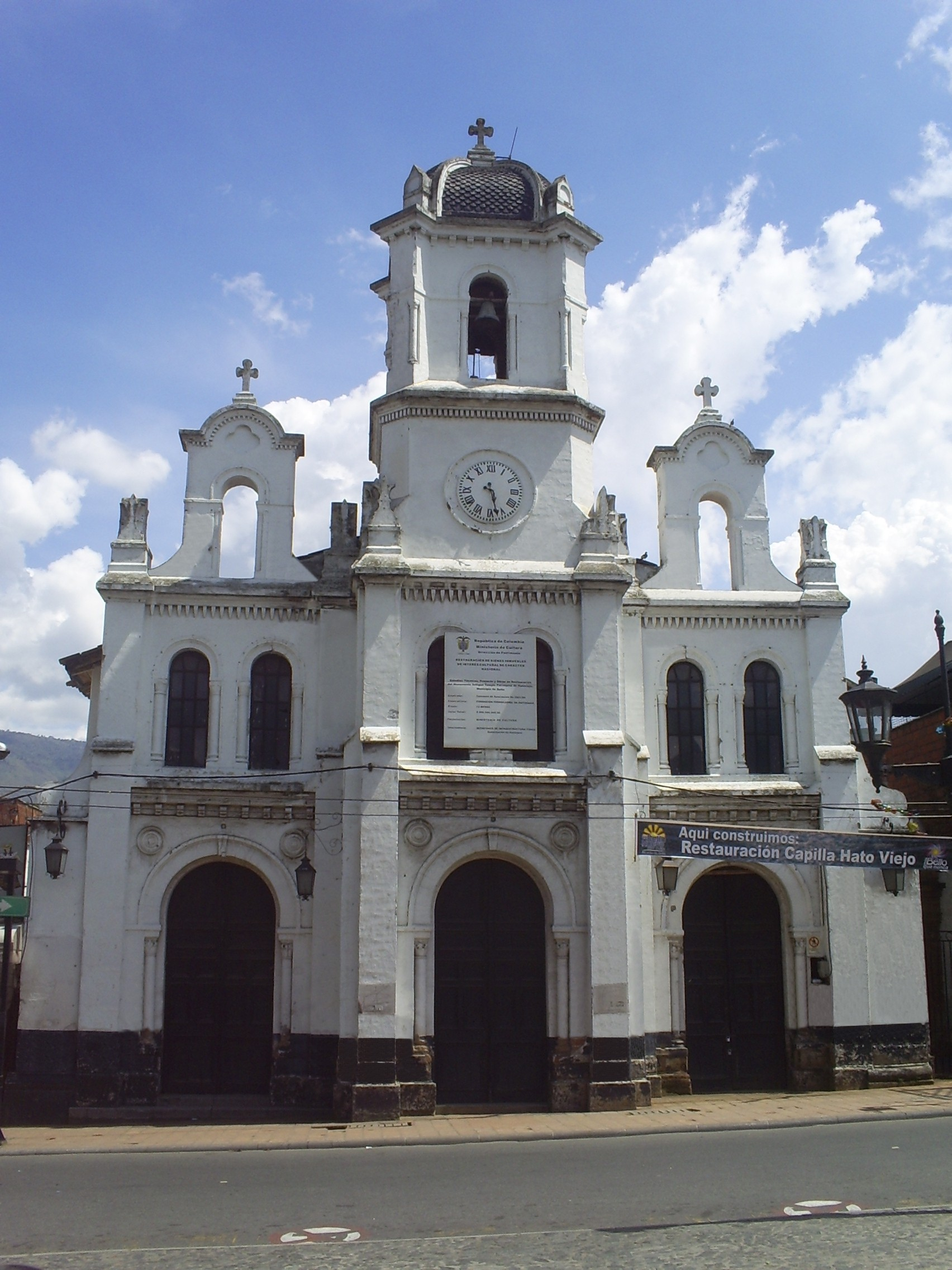
Chapel of Nuestra Señora del Rosario in Hatoviejo, better known as the Hatoviejo Chapel.

In this context the colonizers exercised their chivalry, understood as "that noble philosophy that reacted against innovations." Thus they endowed their farms with chapels to signify prestige and noble origin and so it can be inferred that in Bello the colony was not given a foundation that "involve a regular pattern of squares and streets. Hatoviejo was not a village as it was in the beginning the town of Candelaria." The chapels that were constructed were Our Lady of Chiquinquirá (in 1653) Our Lady of the Rosary (1720), Our Lady of Sopetrán (in Madera, 1775) and Our Lady of Guadalupe (in Fontidueño, 1761). Later these temples were moved or demolished, as happened with the Hatoviejo Parish Church of Our Lady of the Rosary, demolished in 1788 in order to build the Chapel of Hatoviejo in 1792, which still stands. At the end of the eighteenth century, in 1788, Hatoviejo was elevated to the status of party, assigned to the jurisdiction of the town of Nuestra Señora de la Candelaria in Medellín.

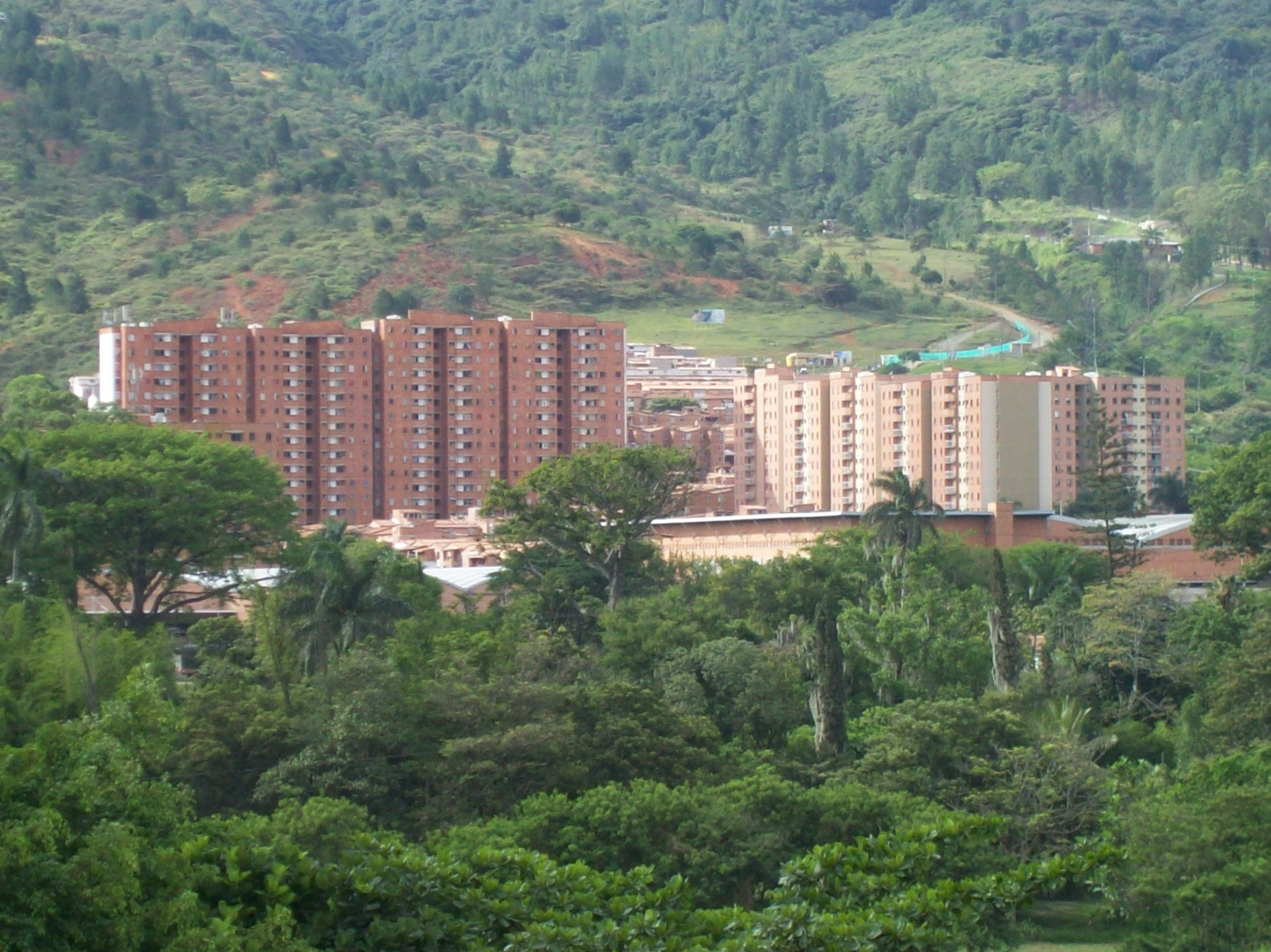
Apartments at the Bello exit.

In Hatoviejo the land was organized according to the economic role of its people. The reference to "Calle arriba" (Up the road) and "Calle Abajo," (down the road) was common. The square and the Church of the Rosary were used as the central point. On 28 December 1883 the "Ciudadano Presidente " of the Antioquia State renamed the village from Hatoviejo to Bello, at the request of a group of people who felt that the name "Hato" made them despised and humiliated as hato was a place for animals. Instead, the name Bello was "more cultured, more appropriate and more worthy of the great patriarch of American letters" (Andrés Bello).

== Geography ==
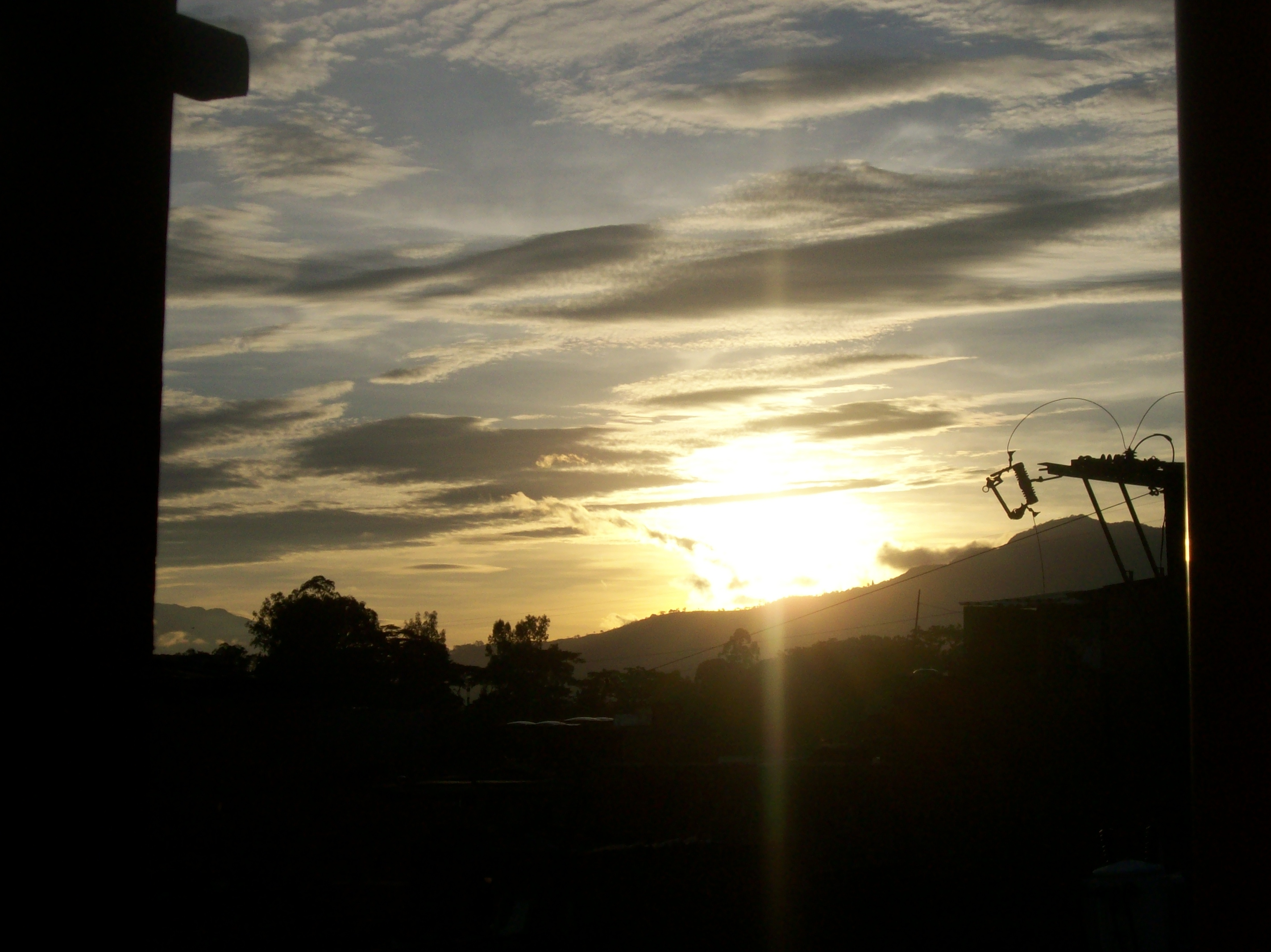
Dawn on 10 June 2012, in Bello

Bello forms part of the Aburrá Valley, a valley in the Andes mountain range. It is located next to Medellín at its northern border in the Valley of Aburrá. The climate is warm and is affected by gentle winds throughout the year.

The city has a total area of 142.36 km^{2} of which 19.7 km^{2} are urban land and 122.66 km^{2} is rural land. This valley is fully urbanized in the plains, and very busy on its slopes. In the valley it is crossed by the Medellín River, which runs south–north, and its 57 streams throughout its 70 kilometers.

Topographically the urban part of the city is a tilted plane that descends from 1600 to 1400 meters above sea level. Bello is in the northern part of the valley and the mountains surrounding the city exceed 2,500 meters.

The main topographic feature is the Cerro Quitasol (pyramidal mountain, 2,880 meters above sea level), located north of the city and considered by its grandeur as the tutelary hill of Bello.

=== Climate ===
The city, being located in the tropics, does not experience climatic changes. The average rainfall is 1347 mm., The temperature is determined by climatic zones ranging from desert, through cold up to medium where he is the highest, which has an average temperature of 25.7 °C throughout the year, alternating between dry and wet periods and is cooled by winds that blow along the valley throughout the year.

Additionally the area receives trade winds that blow from the lower valleys of the Cauca River to the west and the Magdalena River to the east and middle, creating a dense layer of warm air, which causes the lower part of the town and some surrounding areas to increase in humidity and increase barometric temperature. As a result of the wind, northern municipalities such as Bello, Copacabana, Girardota and Barbosa are warmer than the Antioquia capital of Medellín, despite its proximity.

Climate data for Bello (Tulio Ospina), elevation 1,438 m (4,718 ft), (1981–2010)
Month	Jan	Feb	Mar	Apr	May	Jun	Jul	Aug	Sep	Oct	Nov	Dec	Year
Record high °C (°F)	32.6 (90.7)	34.0 (93.2)	33.8 (92.8)	33.2 (91.8)	32.8 (91.0)	38.0 (100.4)	32.6 (90.7)	34.2 (93.6)	32.8 (91.0)	31.6 (88.9)	31.2 (88.2)	33.2 (91.8)	38.0 (100.4)
Mean daily maximum °C (°F)	27.8 (82.0)	28.5 (83.3)	28.6 (83.5)	27.8 (82.0)	27.9 (82.2)	28.2 (82.8)	28.4 (83.1)	28.7 (83.7)	28.2 (82.8)	27.3 (81.1)	27.1 (80.8)	27.0 (80.6)	27.9 (82.2)
Daily mean °C (°F)	21.7 (71.1)	22.2 (72.0)	22.3 (72.1)	22.1 (71.8)	22.1 (71.8)	22.3 (72.1)	22.5 (72.5)	22.5 (72.5)	21.9 (71.4)	21.2 (70.2)	21.3 (70.3)	21.4 (70.5)	22 (72)
Mean daily minimum °C (°F)	16.5 (61.7)	16.1 (61.0)	17.1 (62.8)	17.5 (63.5)	17.5 (63.5)	17.1 (62.8)	16.6 (61.9)	16.9 (62.4)	16.9 (62.4)	17.0 (62.6)	17.0 (62.6)	16.8 (62.2)	16.9 (62.4)
Record low °C (°F)	8.6 (47.5)	8.9 (48.0)	11.0 (51.8)	11.0 (51.8)	11.0 (51.8)	10.2 (50.4)	10.0 (50.0)	9.4 (48.9)	10.6 (51.1)	11.5 (52.7)	10.0 (50.0)	8.6 (47.5)	8.6 (47.5)
Average precipitation mm (inches)	38.1 (1.50)	53.0 (2.09)	99.6 (3.92)	161.0 (6.34)	197.4 (7.77)	139.5 (5.49)	120.9 (4.76)	127.1 (5.00)	174.4 (6.87)	215.6 (8.49)	136.5 (5.37)	79.4 (3.13)	1,542.4 (60.72)
Average precipitation days (≥ 1.0 mm)	8	9	15	20	21	17	17	17	20	23	18	11	193
Average relative humidity (%)	77	74	75	78	78	76	74	73	77	80	80	79	77
Mean monthly sunshine hours	186.0	149.6	161.2	132.0	148.8	174.0	207.7	192.2	159.0	133.3	138.0	164.3	1,946.1
Mean daily sunshine hours	6.0	5.3	5.2	4.4	4.8	5.8	6.7	6.2	5.3	4.3	4.6	5.3	5.3
Source: Instituto de Hidrologia Meteorologia y Estudios Ambientales

== Demographics ==
Population increase of Bello, 1964–2005
Years Census	Population total	% Increase Base year 1964
1964*	95.463	100%
1973*	109.173	114%
1985*	214.921	225%
1993*	293.841	307%
2005*	371.973	389%
* Census carried out by the DANE

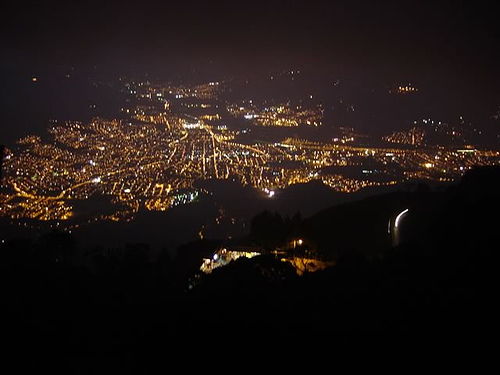
Bello at night

According to figures from the 2005 DANE census, Bello has 371,973 inhabitants. It is the second largest city in the metropolitan area of the Aburrá Valley, altogether totaling 3,312,165 people. The municipality has a population density of about 2496 per square kilometer. 47.1% of the population are male and 52.9% are female. The literacy rate in the population over 5 years of age is 92.9%. Public services have high coverage, since 96.9% of households have electricity service, 96.4% have water service and 91.4% have telephone communication.

According to figures from the Government of Antioquia based on the 2004 Quality of Life Survey, the prevailing socioeconomic strata in the municipality is 2 (low) with 39.3%, followed by the strata 3 (medium-low) at 36.1% then strata 1 (low-high) with 20.2%. In a smaller proportion are also strata 4 (middle) and 5 (medium-high) with 4.3% and 0.1% respectively, which are mainly rustic houses located on the sidewalks of the municipality.

== Ethnography ==
According to figures from the DANE 2005 census, the ethnographic composition of the municipality is:

- Mestizos & Whites: 92.2%
- Afro-Colombians: 7.7%
- Indigenous: 0.1%

== Politico-administrative structures ==
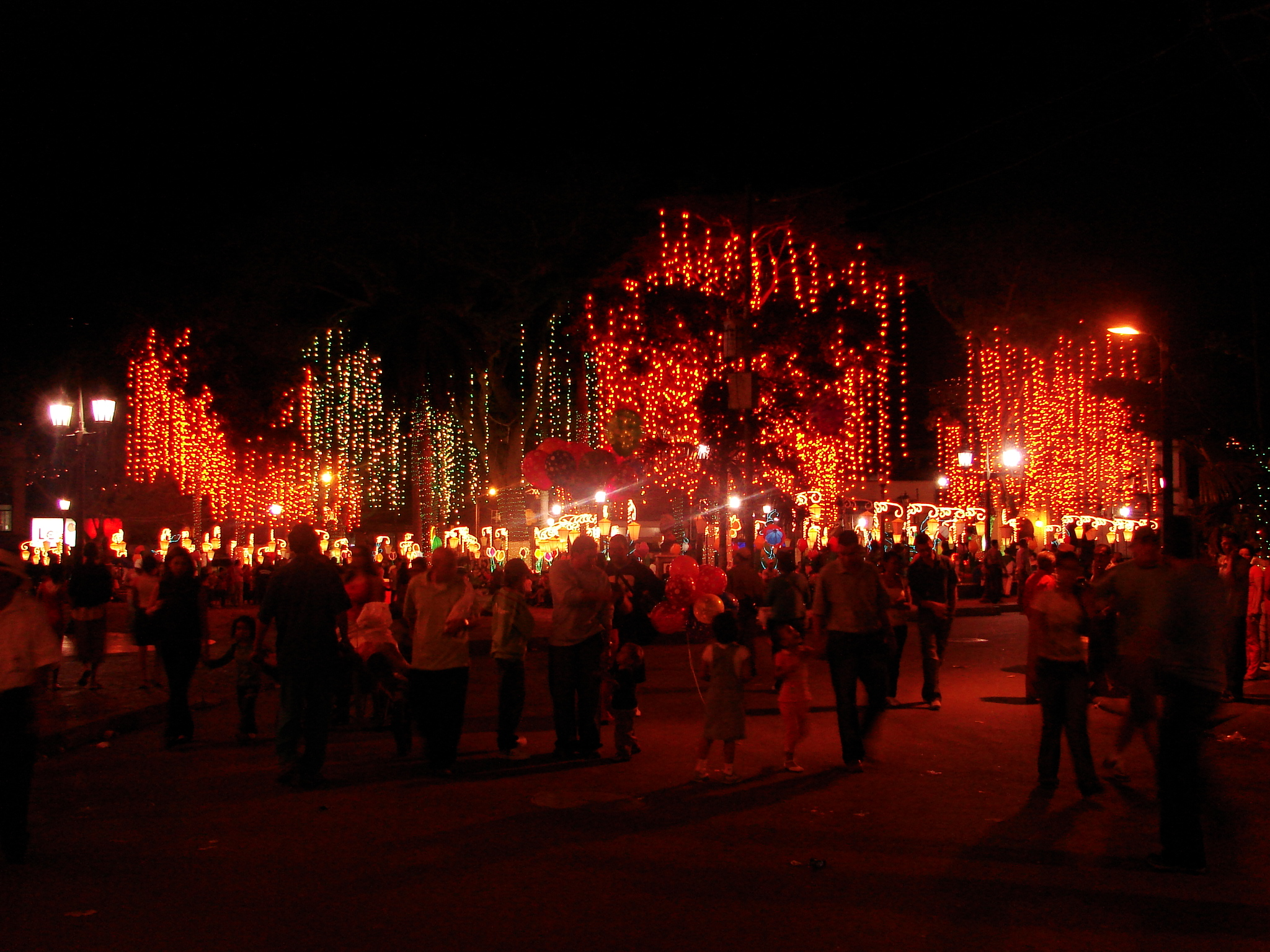
Christmas lights in the main park in 2007.

Bello is governed by a democratic system based on administrative decentralization processes generated by the Political Constitution of Colombia, 1991. The city is governed by a mayor (executive power) and a Municipal Council (legislative power).

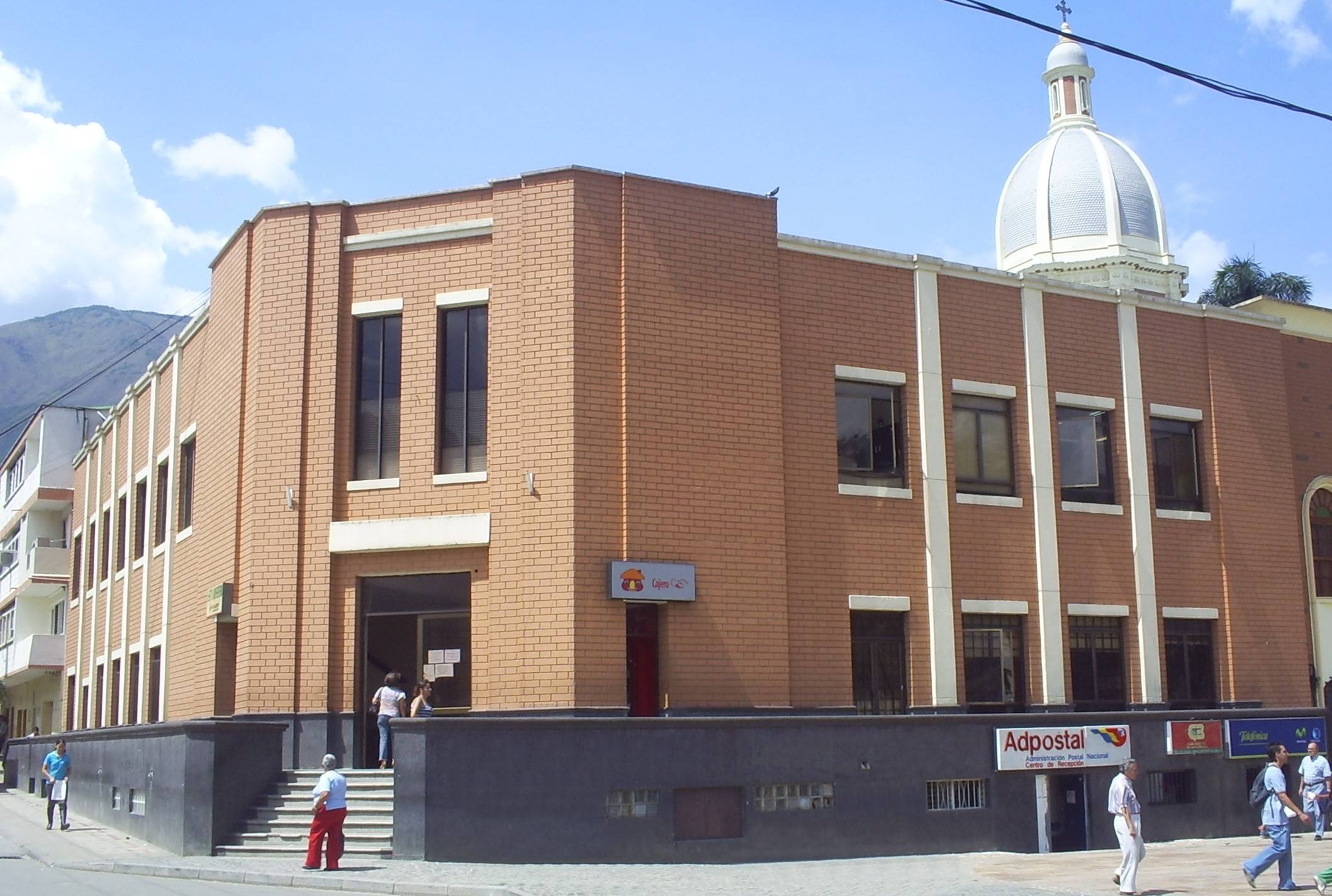
Bello City Hall.

The Mayor of Bello is the head of government and of the municipal administration, representing the municipality legally, judicially and extrajudicially. It is a position elected by popular vote for a four-year period. The current mayor is Carlos Alirio Munoz Lopez.

The main functions of the Mayor are to administer the resources of the municipality, to provide for the welfare and interests of his fellow citizens and to represent them before the Federal Government. He should also promote local policies to improve the quality of life, such as health programs, housing, education and road infrastructure; equally, he maintains public order.

The Municipal Council of Bello is a popularly elected public corporation, composed of 19 democratically elected councillors, for a term of four years. The council is the legislative body and makes binding agreements within its territorial jurisdiction. Its functions include approving projects from the mayor, issuing the organic standards of the budget and issuing the annual revenues and expenditures budget. To manage the municipality, the Mayor has 14 ministries:

- Administrative Services Secretariat
- Secretariat of Government
- Secretariat of Sport and Recreation
- Education and Culture Secretariat
- Internal Control Secretariat
- Secretariat of Health
- Planning Secretariat
- Secretariat of Infrastructure
- The Environment Secretariat
- General Secretariat
- Secretariat of Finance
- Secretariat of Welfare and Social Integration
- Secretariat of Transport and Traffic
- Secretariat of Entrepreneurship

=== Administrative divisions ===
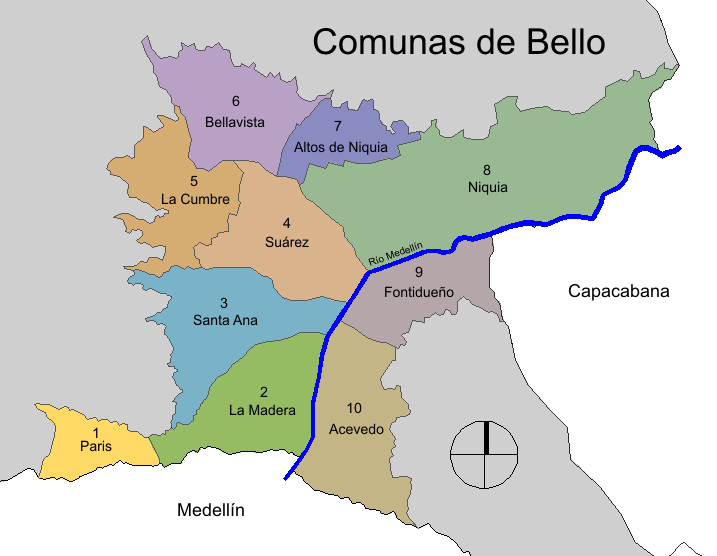
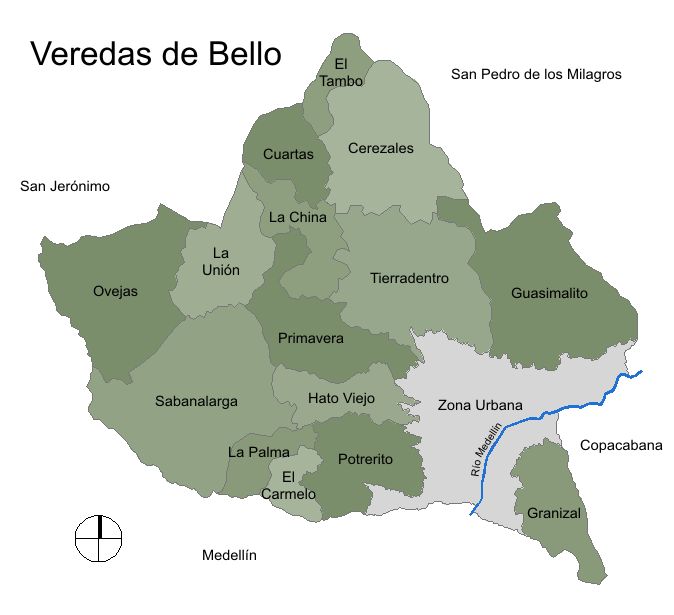

The urban Bello area is divided into 12 communes. These are subdivided into neighborhoods, totaling 82. In rural areas there is a township and 15 hamlets.

In the 2011 local elections, blank ballots won. Un-marked votes, invalid votes and blank votes increased to 56.7% from 43.3%, for the only candidate represented. As a result of this the elections had to be repeated in less than a month.

The communes are:

Communes
Commune no.	Districts	Commune no.	Barrios
1. Paris	8	6. Bellavista	10
2. La Madera	7	7. Mirador y Altos de Niquía	4
3. Santa Ana	6	8. Niquia	6
4. Suárez	18	9. Fontidueño	5
5. La Cumbre	12	10. Acevedo	6
Total barrios 82

Hamlets
Potrerito	Guasimalito	La Unión
Hato Viejo	El Carmelo	La China
Primavera	Ovejas	Cerezales
Granizal	La Palma	Cuartas
*Tierradentro	Sabanalarga	El Tambo

=== Metropolitan area ===
The Metropolitan Area of the Aburrá Valley is an administrative political entity which is based throughout the Aburrá Valley at an average altitude of about 1,538 meters.

The area consists of 10 municipalities, and is crossed from south to north by the Medellín River which, being born to its south in the town of Caldas, it takes on the name of Rio Porce in the north, in the municipality of Barbosa.

It was the first metropolitan area to be established in Colombia in 1980 and is the second largest metropolitan area in the country in population after the Capital District of Bogotá. The total population, which includes the urban and rural population of the ten cities is 3,312,165 inhabitants.

The main urban area of the Metropolitan Area of the Aburrá Valley is located in the center of the valley and consists of the four largest cities by population: Medellín, Bello, Itagüí and Envigado.

== Economy ==
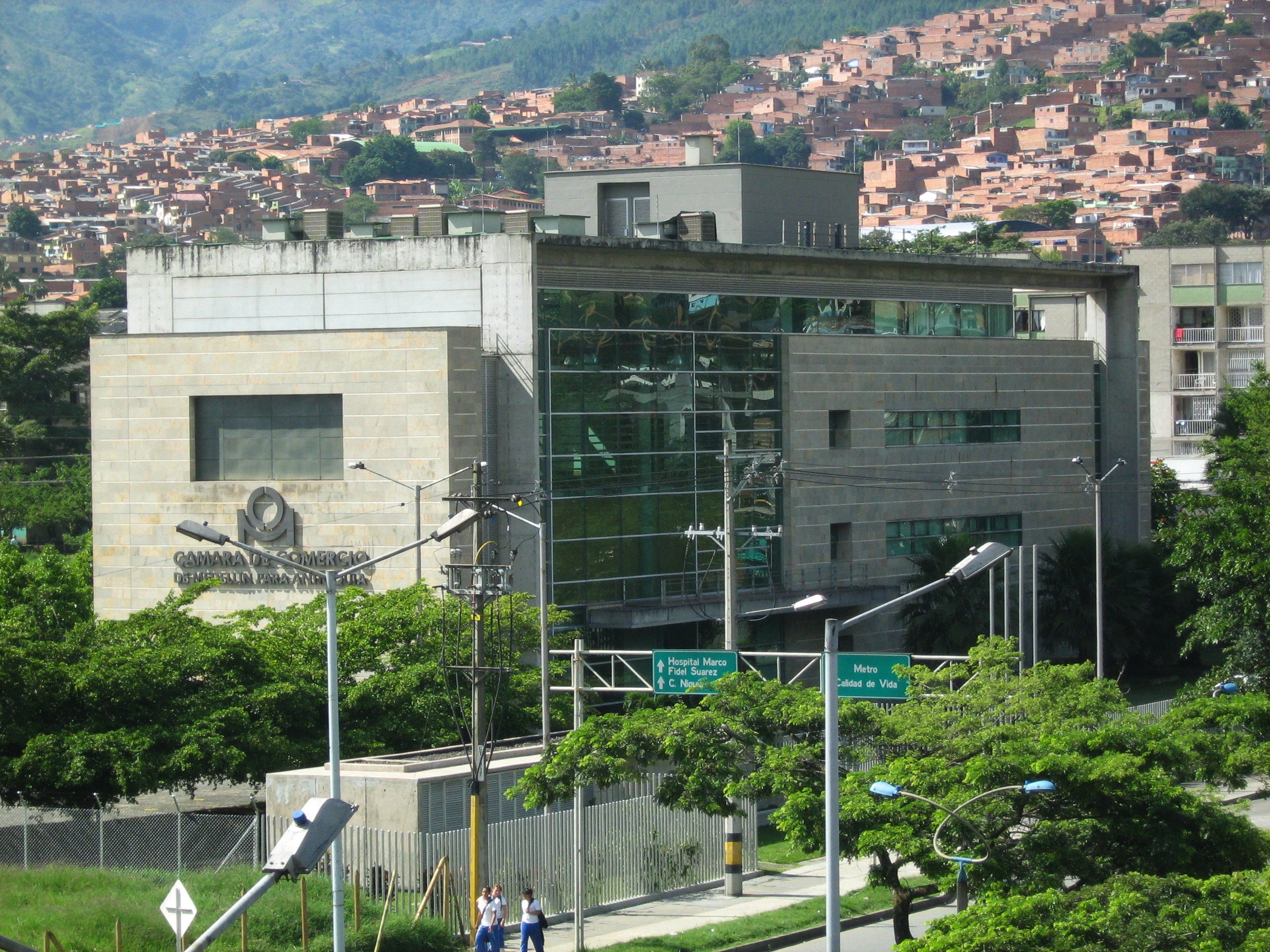
Medellín Chamber of Commerce, Bello headquarters

In the urban area the main economic activities are related to textiles, concentrates, organized trade, informal trade, and the exploitation of sand pits and quarries. The rural areas are devoted to agriculture and livestock on a small scale.

Both industry and trade have been contributing to economic activities in the town as a result of their contribution to and participation in economic growth.

The economic activity of the municipality of Bello is represented in the following sectors according to their levels of participation:

Industrial activity

- Textiles 18.30%
- Wood, paper and publishing, chemicals, coal, rubber, mineral and nonmetallic products 16.92%
- Other nonspecific industries 14.85%
- Basic machinery and equipment metal industries 12.60%

Commercial activity

- Retail (Includes agricultural production) 61.51%
- Hotels and accommodation 26.14%
- Transport, storage and communication 9.60%
- Wholesale 2.19%
- Construction 0.78%

== Communication ==
In the town of Bello virtually all possible telecommunications services are available, from payphones, to mobile phone networks, broadband wireless networks, browsing centers or cybercafés, IP communication, and others.

The leading company in this sector is EPM Telecommunications (under its brand UNE), recently separated from its parent company Public Enterprises of Medellín (EPM). Also present are Bello Cable Bello Television Telecommunications Company, the Bogotá Telecommunications Enterprise (ETB), Telmex and Telecom (from Telefónica).

There are three mobile operators all with nationwide coverage and GSM technology, Claro, Movistar (Telefónica) and Tigo of ETB, EPM and Luxembourg's Millicom International Telecommunications.

The Avantel company also operates in the municipality, offering trunking service, which is done by means of a hybrid cellular and radio.

The city has several channels of broadcast television, the three local channels – Telemedellín, Channel U and Televida, (which cover the Valle de Aburrá), a regional channel Teleantioquia, and five national channels: two private – Caracol and RCN, and three public – Canal Uno, Señal Institucional and Señal Colombia. In addition the TVN Channel of the Cable Bello Television Cable System, reaches approximately 80,000 thousand homes. Subscription TV companies offer their own channels.

The city has a variety of AM and FM stations, with both local and national coverage, most of which are managed by Caracol Radio or RCN Radio, although there are other independent stations such as Todelar and Super.

In Bello and the rest of Antioquia there are two major newspapers in circulation: El Colombiano and El Mundo, both with a long history at the regional level. Also circulating are the El Tiempo and El Espectador newspapers, both with national circulation.

== Health ==
Bello has an infrastructure of 4 hospitals, 1 clinic, four health centers and one health post in the rural area. In addition to private health service, public health services are run by the Health Secretariat.

- Antioquia Mental Hospital (Departmental)
- Marco Fidel Suárez Hospital (Niquía Headquarters) (Departmental)
- Rosalpi Hospital (Municipal)
- Zamora Hospital (Municipal)
- Marco Fidel Suarez Hospital (Formerly Victor Jaramillo Cardenas) (University of Antioquia and Departmental)
- Paris Health Center (Municipal)
- Fontidueño Health Center (Municipal)
- Playa Rica Health Center (Municipal)
- Mirador Health Center (Municipal)
- North Clinic
- EMMSA Specialized Clinic

== Education ==
Bello has 111 educational institutions, of which 41 are public and 70 are private. Over 84,002 students are educated in these institutions, of which 48,086 are within the public sector and 35,916 within the private sector. Throughout the metropolitan area there is a wide number of higher education institutions. There are four such institutions located within Bello's territory: the University of San Buenaventura, Bello branch of Uniminuto, a sub-site of the Jaime Isaza Cadavid Colombian Polytechnic and the Marco Fidel Suárez Polytechnic.

== Sports ==
Until 2010, the town had a football (soccer) team, Atlético Bello, in the Colombian Professional Second Division ("Primera B"). That team was later acquired by Atlético Juventud and is now defunct.
