= Metropolitan Area of the Aburrá Valley =

Socially and economically organized region in Colombia

Coordinates: 6°15′N 75°36′W

Metropolitan Area of the Aburrá Valley Área Metropolitana del Valle de Aburrá
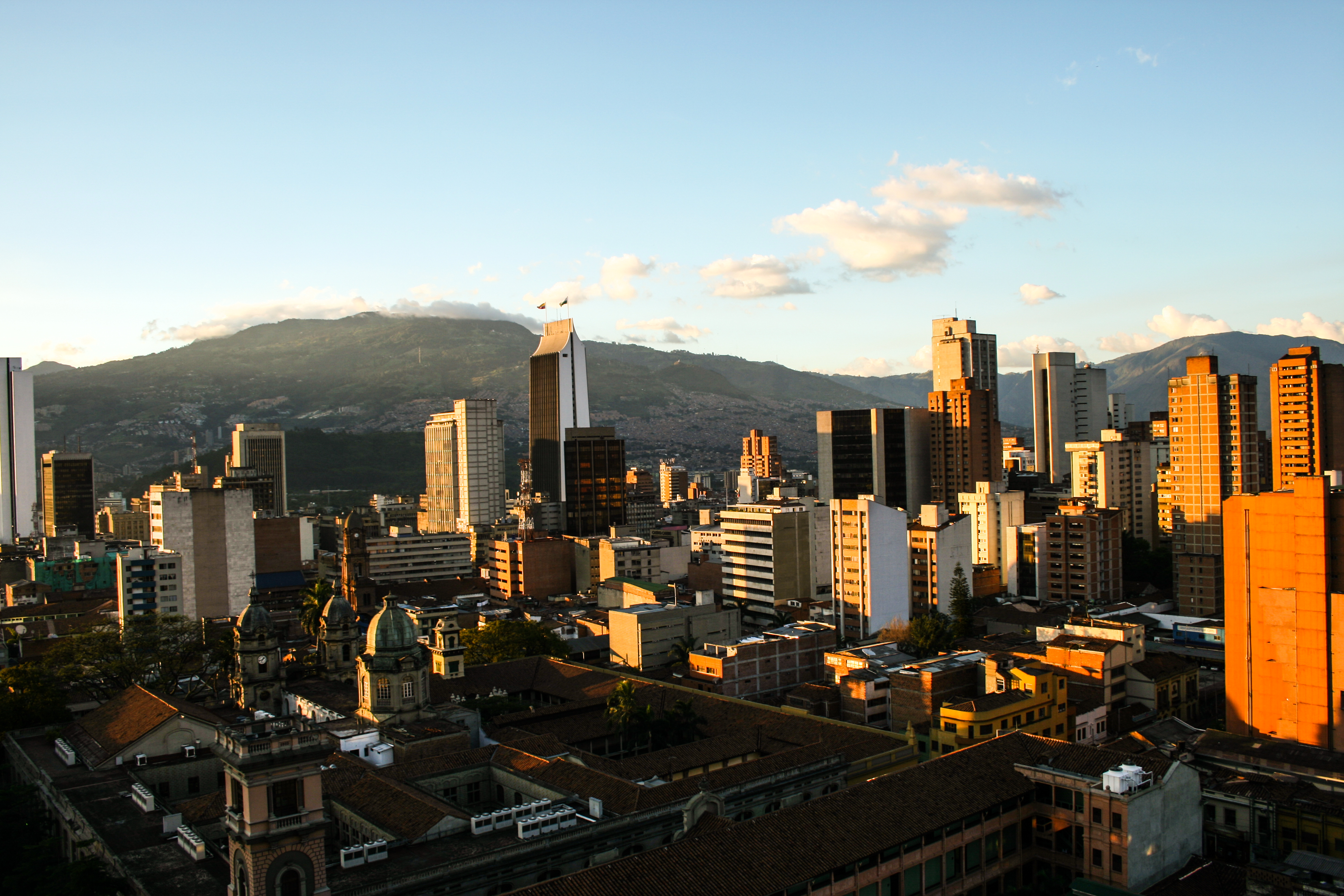
- Medellín

- Location of the Aburrá Valley region within the Antioquia Department
- Country: Colombia
- Department: Antioquia

Area
  - Metro: 1,157 km^{2} (447 sq mi)

Population
  - Metro: 4,055,296
  - Metro density: 3,505/km^{2} (9,078/sq mi)

GDP
  - Metro: US$ 35 billion (2023)
  - Per capita: US$ 8,500 (2023)

The Metropolitan Area of Medellín, Officially, Metropolitan Area of the Aburrá Valley (Spanish: Área Metropolitana del Valle de Aburrá) is the second most important and populated metropolitan area in Colombia. The region is made up of ten municipalities, Medellín being the most important, largest and the capital city of the Antioquia Department.

== History ==
The Metropolitan Area of the Aburrá Valley was the first metropolitan area created in Colombia, in 1980. The metropolitan area was created in order to produce economic integration, projection, and planning for urban development in the cities over the Aburra Valley.

Municipalities in The Metropolitan Area of Medellín (in dark gray, the city proper)

The total population of the ten cities and municipalities part of this metropolitan area is close to four million inhabitants. The development of the Aburra Valley occurred in the 1930s after a rapid population growth that produced a conurbation of Medellín, Itagüí, Envigado, and Bello.

Medellín, as the capital of the Antioquia Department, main economic center and host of most of local government entities contributed to a rapid urban development which absorbed many corregimientos such as Robledo, La América, La Floresta, Guayabal, and Belén, among others. With the industrialization the middle and higher class moved to the southern parts of the city such as El Poblado, which ultimately reached the city of Envigado, while the working class population of Medellín reached cities to the north (Bello) and the southwest (Itagüí).

== Geography ==
The Metropolitan Area of the Aburrá Valley borders with the municipalities of Ebejico, Heliconia, Angelopolis, and Amagá to the west, with the municipalities of Santa Barbara and Fredonia to the south. To the southwest it borders with the Eastern Antioquia region and to the north with the municipalities of San Jeronimo, San Pedro, and Don Matías covering a total area of 1,152 km^{2}. The largest being the territory of the municipality of Medellín with 382 km^{2} and the smallest one Sabaneta with 15 km^{2}.

Most of the Metropolitan Area is located within the Aburrá Valley.

== Municipalities ==
Municipalities	Extension [[km^{2}]]	Population (hab)	Density (inhabitants/km^{2})	Altitude m	Distance Medellín Downtown (km)	Map
Medellín	380,64	2 368 282*	6 221,8	1538	0	
Bello	142,36	595 457*	3 960,9	1450	10	
Envigado	78,80	202 310*	3504	1575	10	
Itagüí	17,00	255 369*	15 021,7	1550	11	
Sabaneta	15,00	48 997*	3 266,4	1550	14	
Barbosa	206,00	46 951*	227,9	1300	42	
Caldas	133,40	74 072*	555,2	1750	22	
La Estrella	35,00	58 414*	1 668,9	1775	16	
Girardota	78,00	49 381*	663,0	1425	26	
Copacabana	70,00	66 665*	952,3	1454	18	
Total	1 157,39	3 591 963*	3 104	—	—	
*DANE

== See also ==
- Metropolitan Areas of Colombia
