= Escuela de Arte Eladio Vélez (Itagüí) =

Art school in Colombia

Eladio Velez Art School
- Motto: Sow Arts 34 years!
- Type: Private
- Established: January 21, 1979
- Rector: Ligia Pimienta Estrada
- Location: Itagüí, Antioquia department, Colombia
- Campus: Urban
- Website: www.escuelaeladiovelez.edu.co

The Eladio Velez Art School, also known as Eladio Vélez School, is a high Art school technology Colombia, of private character.

It was founded on February 2, 1979, by the Society of Public Improvements of Itagüí. It is a school specializing in the artistic and cultural world. It also provides various social activities that help strengthen the art and culture of the city.

== Headquarters ==
Currently has 1 headquarters in Itagüí. It is in honor of the distinguished painter Eladio Vélez.

== Initiation ==
In 1979 is launched the idea of creating an art school private. All with the intention of offering a different alternative in town. Since 1979 Eladio Vélez School has become the city's heritage not only by the artist but by representing the possibility offered to the population of the city.

== Courses ==
Arts

- Painting
- Drawing
- Watercolor painting
- Sculpture
- Photography
- Manga

Music

- Music
- Guitar
- Piano
- Vocal pedagogy

== See also ==
- Art school
- Eladio Vélez
- Antioquia department
