= Itagüí =

- Municipality and city
- Municipio de Itagüí
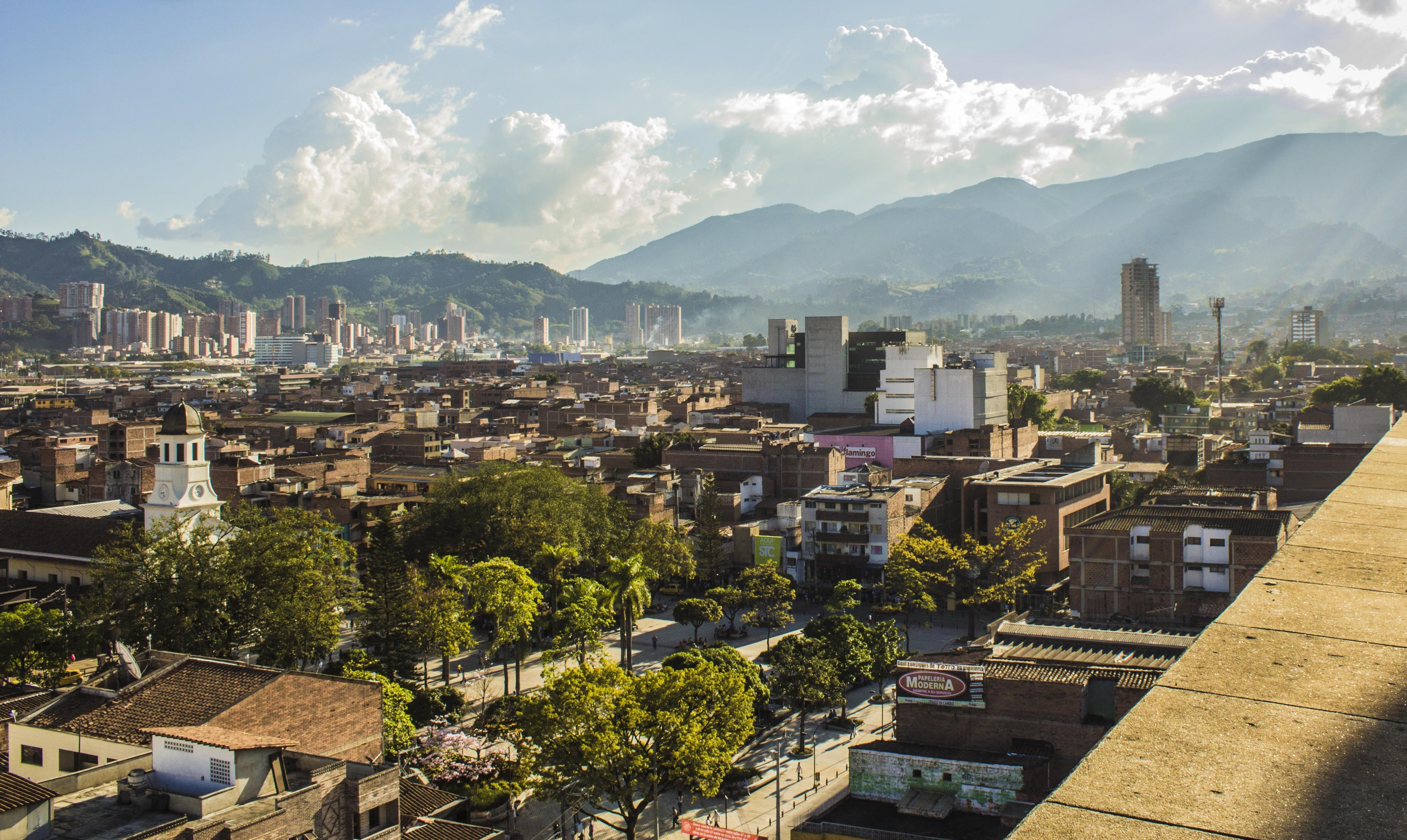

- Flag Coat of arms

- Location of the municipality and town of Itagüí in the Antioquia Department of Colombia

- Location in Colombia
- Coordinates: 6°10′N 75°37′W
- Country: Colombia
- Department: Antioquia Department
- Founded: 1743

Government
  - Mayor: León Mario Bedoya López

Area
  - Municipality and city: 19.65 km^{2} (7.59 sq mi)
  - Urban: 12.74 km^{2} (4.92 sq mi)
- Elevation: 1,550 m (5,090 ft)

Population (2020 est.)
  - Municipality and city: 289,994
  - Density: 14,760/km^{2} (38,220/sq mi)
  - Urban: 265,527
  - Urban density: 20,840/km^{2} (53,980/sq mi)
- Demonym: Itagüiseño
- Time zone: UTC-5 (Colombia Standard Time)
- Area code: 57 + 4
- Website: Official website (in Spanish)

Itagüí (pronounced [itaˈɣwi]) is a city and municipality of Colombia, located in the south of the Aburrá Valley in the Antioquia Department. It is part of the Metropolitan Area of the Aburrá Valley.

== Demographics ==
The population was estimated to be 289,994 in 2020. The population at the 2005 census was 230,272 on an area of 17.74 km^{2}.

== History ==
Founded in 1743, Itagüí was declared a municipality in 1832. Its name comes from (according to some historians) the name of an indigenous chief, Bitagüí. Two of Itagüí's most iconic inhabitants include Diego Echavarría Misas and Eladio Vélez.

There were two chapels in Itagüí in colonial times; one was in the place of the Tablaza that had been owned by Bruno Saldarriaga, built with the permission of the Bishop of Popayán, Francisco José de Figueredo (granted December 19, 1743). Saldarriaga, with Francisco Riaza, gave an extension of thirty blocks for expansion. This chapel was what later came to be elevated to the status of parish.

In 1774, the priest of Medellín, Juan Salvador de Villa, called for the creation of four parishes: Medellín, Bello, Envigado and Itagüí. On 29 April 1825 party Itagüí neighbors gave Mr. Joaquín Vélez Velasquez to represent them before the civil and ecclesiastical governments to achieve this party was elevated to parish district. Then, Mariano Orjuela Garnica took office as the first bishop of Antioquia and the attorney raised the request, but Monsignor Garnica said I should go first to the civil authority, i.e., the governor of the province. This was done, but the governor, Gregorio Maria Urreta was adverse and so reported in a communication of 13 January 1829.

In 1832, Urreta founded the first primary school, at first known by the name of Don Manuel Antonio Piedrahita for several years. It was a private facility, and only in 1871 was opened publicly. On 26 March 1876, Itagüi was connected by Telegraph. This was unveiled when Mayor Joseph M. Ruiz sent the first telegraph message to President Don Reccared in the state of Villa.

In 1931, the first municipal aqueduct was constructed. On 13 May 1945, the Itagüi Library was unveiled, built by philanthropist Diego Echavarría Misas]p. In 1962, he began building the first formal City Hall. In 1967, the renowned painter of Itagüí, Eladio Vélez, died. In 1993, the Administrative Center Municipal of Itagüí (CAMI) and the Estadio Metropolitano City of Itagüí were inaugurated. In 2006, Itagüí and Medellín city limits were defined by an industry sector called Bethlehem.

== Etymology ==
The territory of the present Itagüí was, along with those of Envigado and Sabaneta, a territory inhabited by Nutabes, indigenous tribe which some historians and researchers are classified within the Chibcha language family. The town was inhabited from the early days of the sixteenth century.

Some historians that the name comes from the indigenous chief "Bitagüí", apparently his tribe inhabited this territory, although this may be just a legend. Initially Bitagüí site belonged to different owners, many of whom lived in Medellín. However, later, was inhabited by people who had ties to the founding families of "the Villa" (Medellín).

== Geography ==
Itagüi is located south of the Aburrá Valley, a valley in the Andes, has an area of 17 km^{2}, making it the third smallest municipality in Colombia. The municipality is fully urbanized in the flat.

Itagüi has a relief with inconsiderable heights belonging to the Central Cordillera. The heights are: High Manzanillo and the hills of Three Sweet Names and El Cacique The main stream is the Medellín River, which forms the border with the municipalities of Envigado and Sabaneta. The most important tributary of the river, in the town, is the creek Dona Maria Itagüi walking from west to east.

== Economy ==
Itagüí has a favorable tax rate compared to the surrounding Antioquia Department in having a higher tax collection; which has resulted in the development of major infrastructure in the last 10 years, making it one of Colombia's most important economic engines. Itagüí became the site of Colombia's first motorcycle assembly plant when Auteco opened a factory there in 1962. It also has the presence of other big companies like Carrefour, which has worldwide recognition as Walmart.

A large distillery, FLA, has operated for a century manufacturing rums, liqueurs, aguardientes and other distilled beverages.

The city has the Municipal Administrative Center Itagüí (CAMI), which holds the government and regulating the economy and politics of the city. The CAMI is an urban complex that performs the functions of the local town hall in the subregion Itagui Aburrá Valley in the department of Antioquia in Colombia.

== Political structure - administrative ==
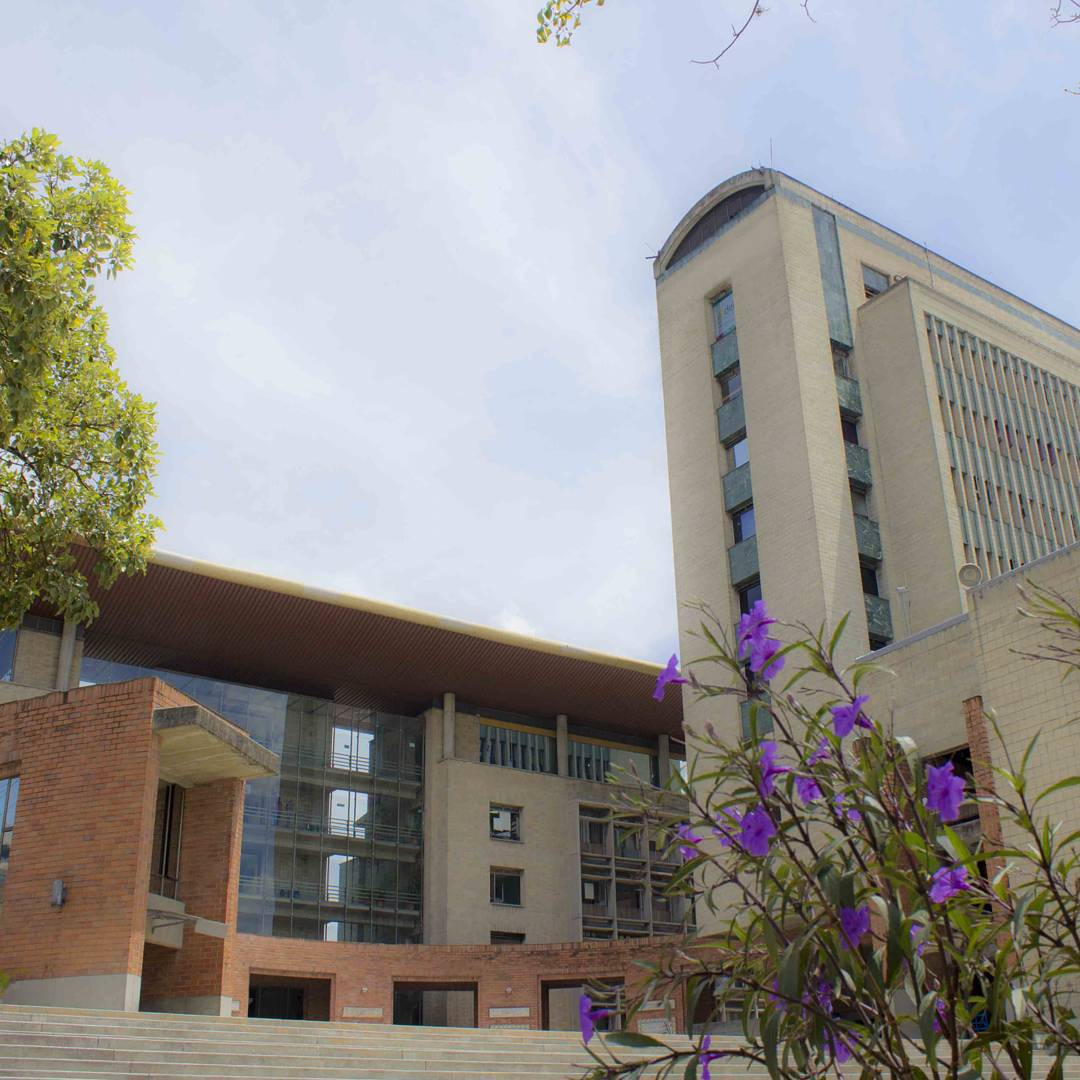
CAMI offices the mayor of the city.

Itagüí is governed by a democratic system based on administrative decentralization processes generated from the proclamation of the Colombian Constitution of 1991. The city is governed by a mayor (executive) and a Municipal Council (legislative power).

Itagüí Mayor is the head of government and municipal administration, representing legal, judicial and extra to the municipality. It is a position elected by popular vote for a four-year period, which currently is held by León Mario Bedoya López for the period 2012–2015. Among its main functions is the administration of the resources of the municipality, to ensure the welfare and interests of their fellow citizens and represent them in the national government, while supporting local policies to improve their quality of life, such as health programs, housing, education and road infrastructure and maintain public order.

The council is a public corporation Itagüí popular vote, made up of 19 councilors from different political, democratically elected for a four. The council is the legislative body of the municipality issued mandatory arrangements within its territorial jurisdiction. Its functions include the mayor approving projects, determine the structure of local government and the functions of its dependencies, issue budget organic standards and issue annual budget of revenues and expenditures.

To manage the municipality, the Mayor has 12 departments, 3-way and 4 advisory offices:

Department of Government; Ministry of Physical Infrastructure; Ministry of Participation and Social Inclusion; Internal Control Advisory Office; Office of Gender Equality Advisor; Secretary of Environment; Office of Internal Disciplinary Control	Secretary of Housing and Habitat; Secretary of Administrative Services; Department of Mobility; Secretary General; Address Local Health; Administrative Director of Planning	Private Secretary; Secretary of the Treasury; Secretary of Education; Secretary of Sports and Recreation; Department of Culture; Legal Office

== Administrative division ==
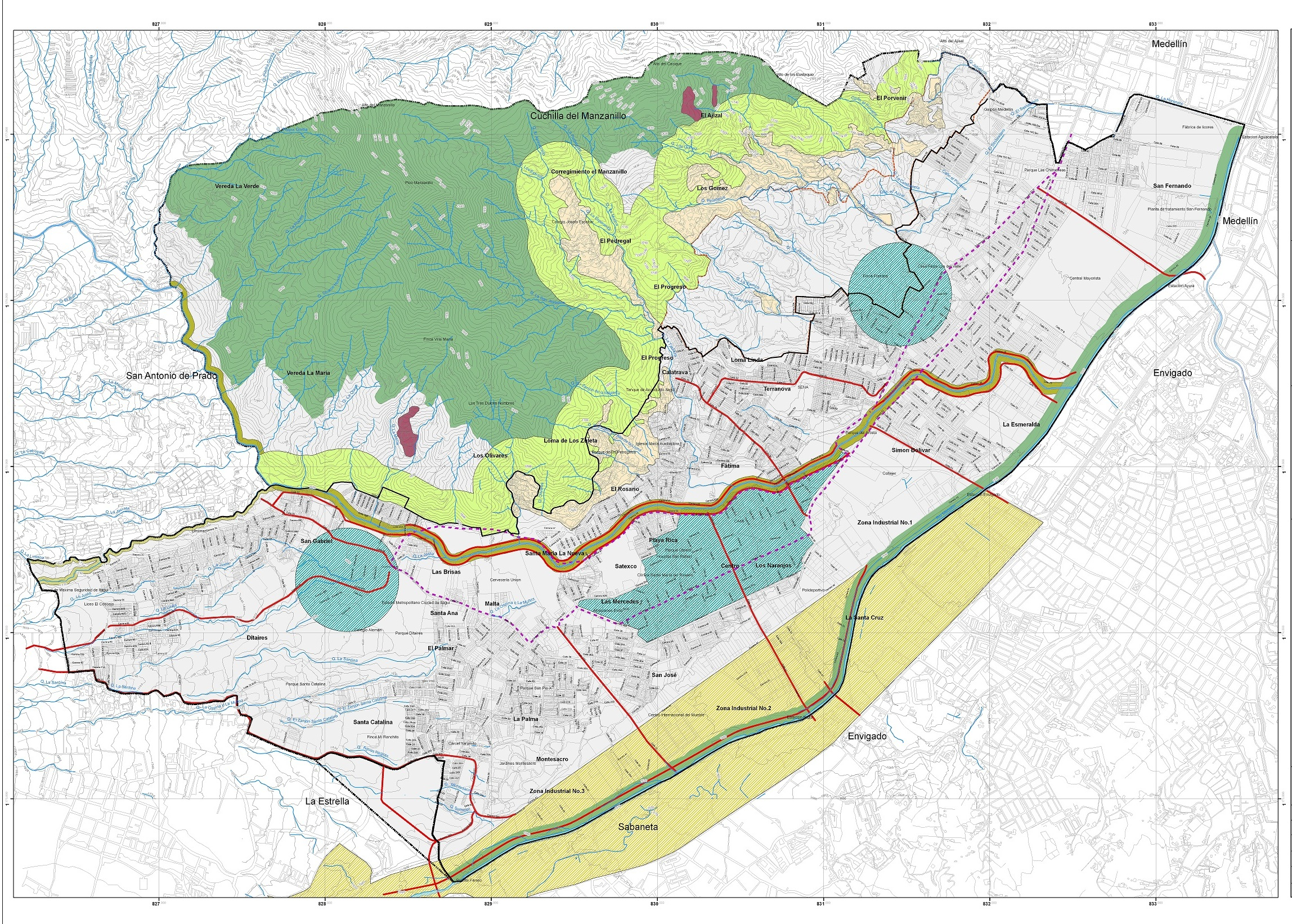
Map - Administrative Political Division Itagüí

The Metropolitan Area of the Aburrá Valley

Itagüí is composed of the county seat, divided into 64 districts organized into six districts, and a township called Manzanillo consisted of 8 paths.

Itagüí bordered to the north the city of Medellín, creating a conurbation that currently is unclear, since both municipalities are in border disputes. The communes and districts are:

COMMUNE 1	COMMUNE 2	COMMUNE 3
· Zona Industrial Nº1 · Zona Industrial Nº2 · La Independencia · San Juan Bautista · San José · Araucaria · La Gloria · Las Mercedes · Centro · Asturias · Los Naranjos · Villa Paula · Artex · Playa Rica · Satexco · San Isidro · La Santa Cruz (Coltejer filter)	· Santa Catalina · Samaria · La Finca · Yarumito · El Palmar · Santa Ana · Samaria Nº1 · Las Margaritas · Malta · Glorieta Pilsen · Monte Verde · Camparola · San Pio X · La Palama · Jardines Montesacro · Zona Industrial Nº3 (South station, Southern Oaks)	· Las Brisas · Pilsen · San Javier · Villa Lia · 19 de Abril · San Gabriel · San Antonio · Triana · Ditaires · San Francisco (Bariloche)
COMMUNE 4	COMMUNE 5	COMMUNE 6
· Santa Maria Nº 1 · Santa Maria Nº 2 · Santa Maria Nº 3 (San Pablo, La hortensia) · Colinas del Sur · Central Mayorista · San Fernando · La Raya · Simón Bolívar	· Las Acacias · Las Américas · El Tablazo · Calatrava · Loma Linda · Terranova · La Aldea · Ferrara · Balcones de Sevilla	· Fátima · El Rosario · La Unión · Santa María la Nueva
Sidewalks
· La Verde (La María) · Los Olivales · El Pedregal	· Loma de los Zuleta · El Progreso · Los Gómez	· El Ajizal · El Porvenir

== Metropolitan Area of the Aburrá Valley ==
The Metropolitan Area of the Aburrá Valley is a political entity administrative sits throughout the Aburrá Valley at an average altitude of 1,538 m.

The area consists of 10 municipalities, and is crossed from south to north by the Medellín river which, being born south of it in the town of Caldas, and in the north, in the town of Barbosa, takes the name of Rio Porce.

It was the first metropolitan area created in Colombia in 1980, and is the second metropolitan area population in the country after the Capital District of Bogotá. The total population, which adds the urban and rural population of the ten cities is of 3.312.165 inhabitants.

The main urban area of the Metropolitan Area of the Aburrá Valley is located in the center of the valley and consists of the four largest cities by population: Medellín, Bello, Itagüí and Envigado.

== Culture ==
Although the town has been known Itagüí in the national as a locality with a strong industrial and commercial vocation, it would still be a major cultural center of the Aburrá Valley and the Antioquia department. Itagüí shown to have important exponents of the art, in painting with Eladio Vélez, in writing, the poet Carlos Enrique Sierra and sculpture find Salvador Arango . Eladio Vélez On behalf of the School of Art this Eladio Vélez Art School Itagüí a historic place in providing artistic alternatives for citizens.

The cultural treasures customs of a population cheerful, hardworking, with a high degree of religiousness characterizes Antioquia department. The main cultural precinct Itagüí is the House of Culture of Itagüí Diego Echavarría Misas. Recently opened Museum Graciliano Arcila Vélez, located in a historic district for Itagüí, rosary, as this is found indigenous parts of the tribes that inhabited this territory. Itagüí has the South Auditorium which hosts various events, among them the Festival Theatre Itagüi City.

=== Famous People ===
- Salvador Arango (1944)
- Camilo Monroy (1998)

=== Festivals and events ===
- The Festival of Industry, Trade and Culture lasts eight days, ending with the World Day of Laziness. Both were started in Itagüí.
- Theatre Festival City Itagüí
- Poetry Festival Park
- October event, Our Lady of the Rosary
- Party of New Year

== Transportation ==
The city has four metro stations: (Itagui, Envigado, Sabaneta, and La Estrella) that link it directly to Medellín and other municipalities. It has a vast bus system that transports people to and from the metro stations as well as a taxi system which conforms with the needs of the city.

== Gallery ==
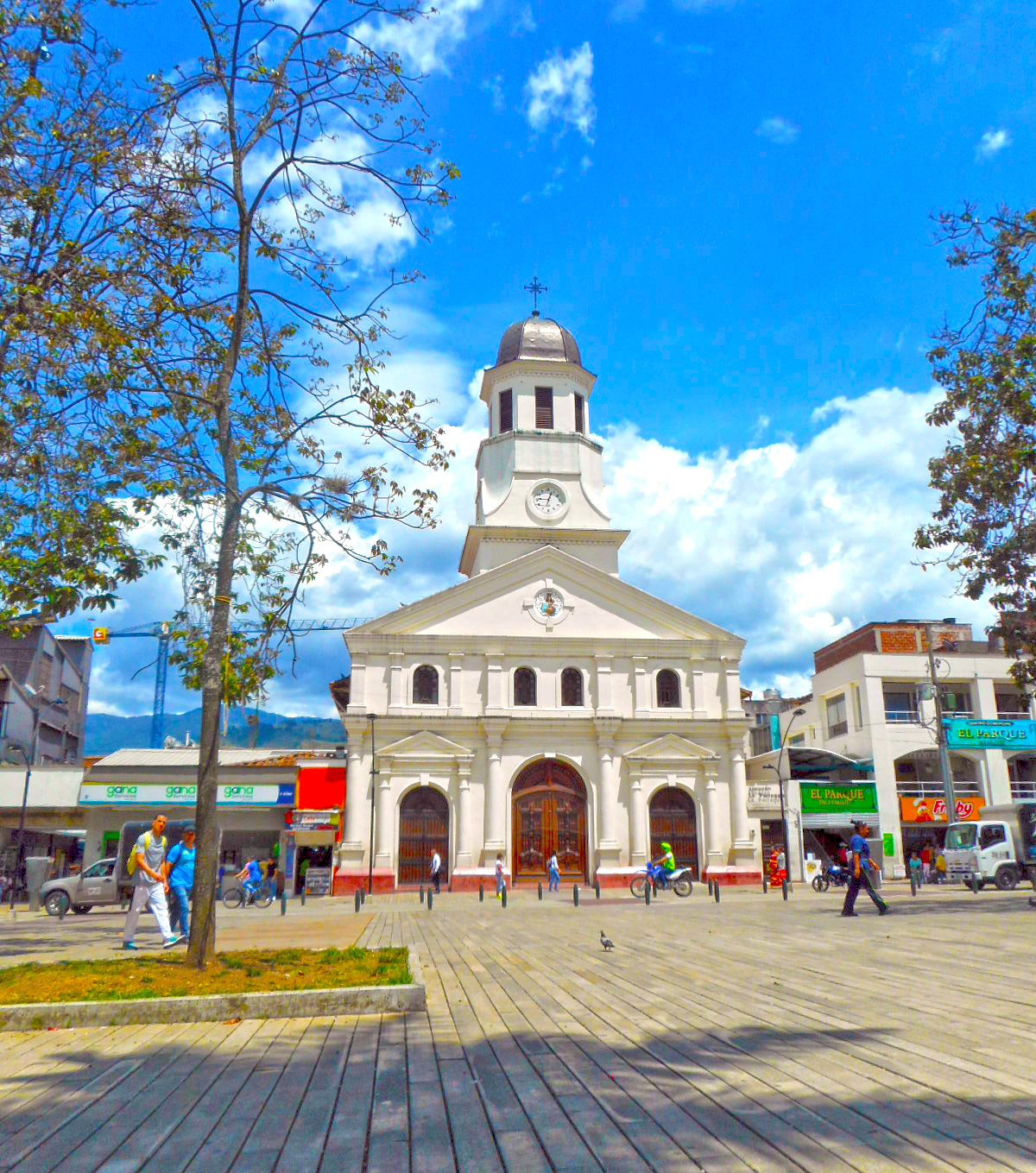
Church in central park of Itagüí

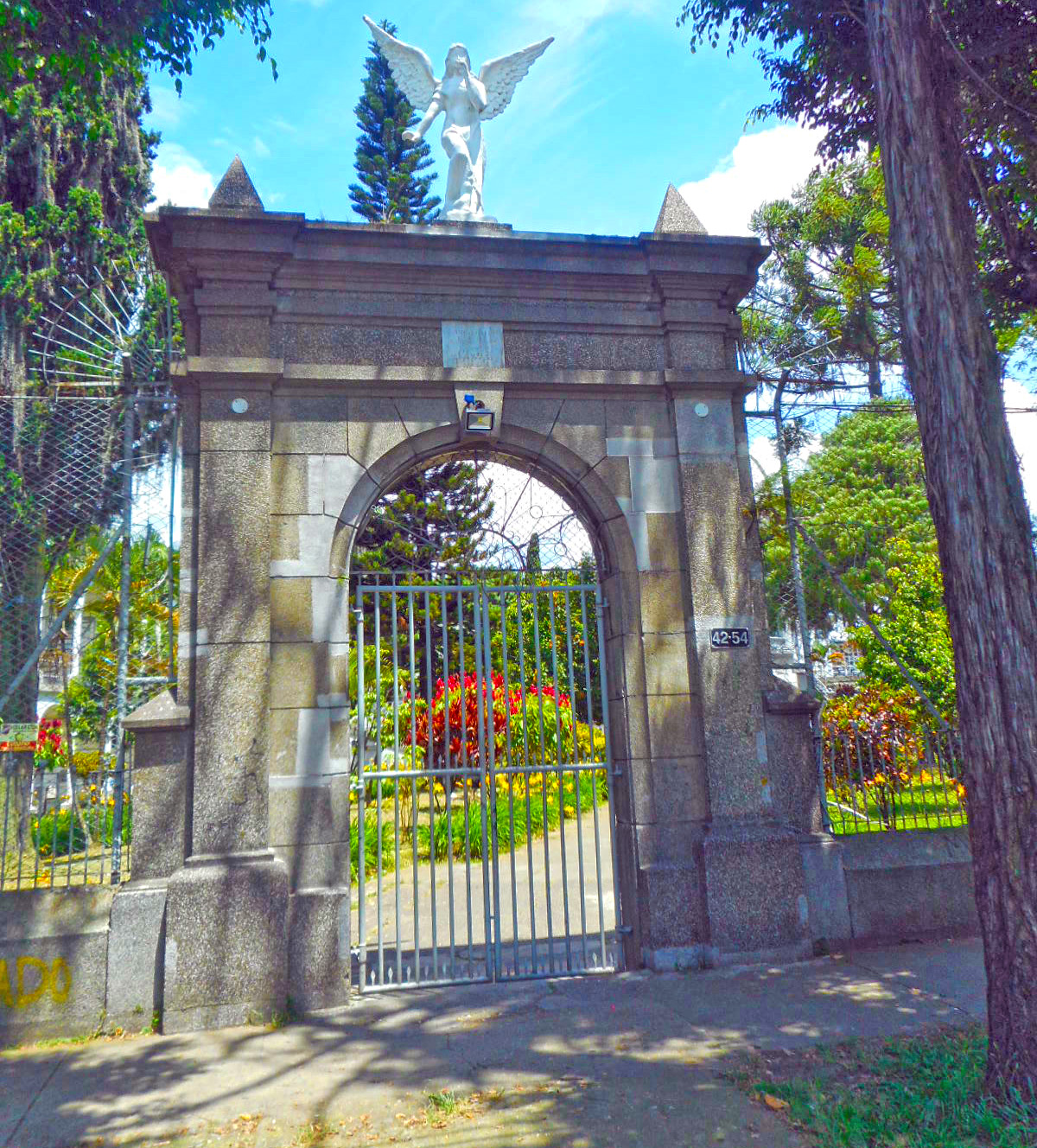
Itagüí cemetery

== Sports ==
Itagüí was home to a football team called Itagüí F.C. from 2008 - 2014 that played in the Colombian first division. However, the team moved to Rionegro in the 2015 season and switched names to Águilas Doradas.

However, the city was not left without a professional team for long; in 2016, a new team was established in Itagui named Leones. They began play that year and were promoted to the top division for the 2018 season, but currently play in the second division as of 2023. The team plays in Estadio Metropolitano Ciudad de Itagüí.

== See also ==
- Colombia
