= Saint Joseph's Church, Envigado =

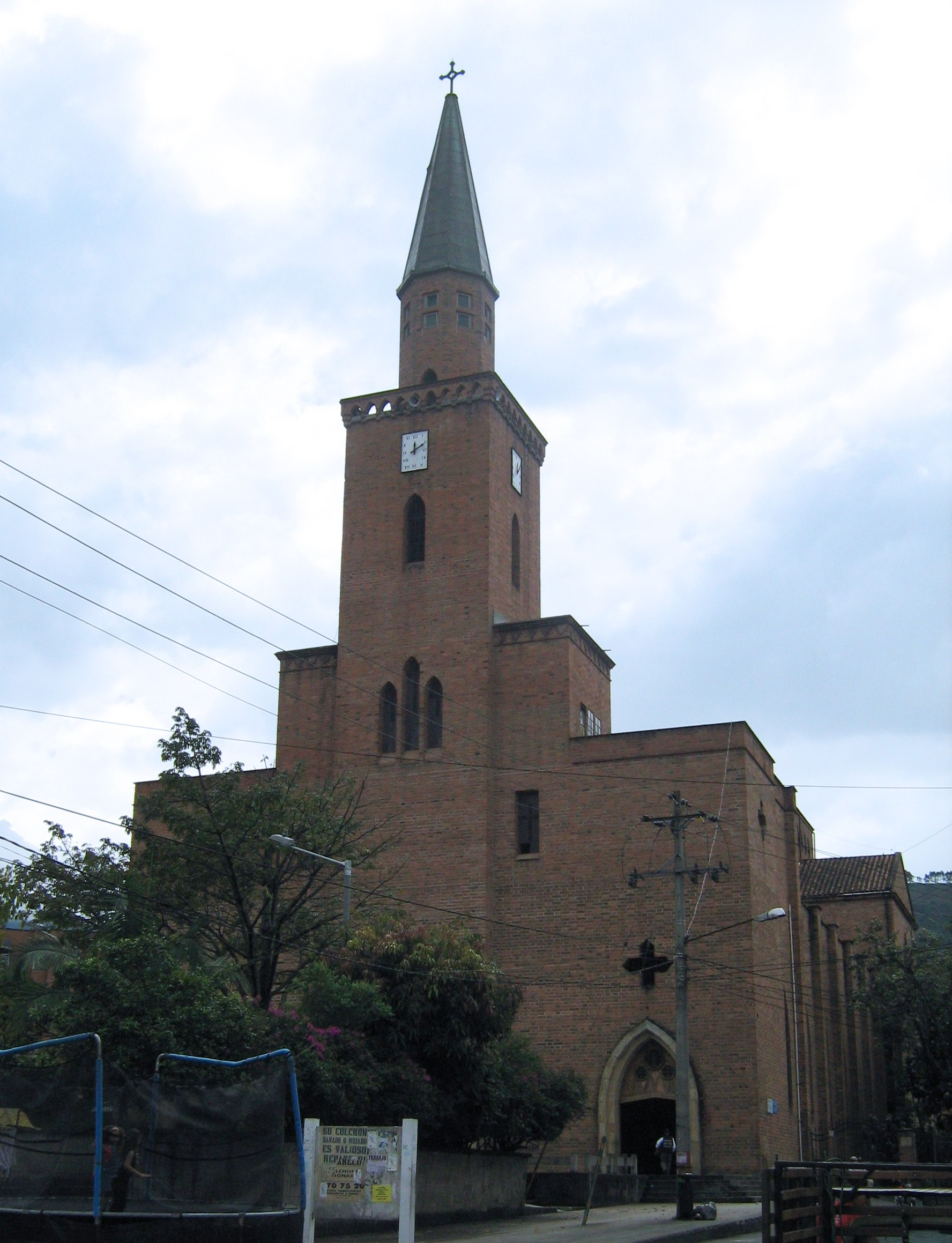
Saint Joseph's Church.

The St Joseph's Church (in Spanish, Iglesia de San José) is a simple gothic revival Roman Catholic church located in Colombia. It is sited at Envigado, Antioquia; near Rosellón, an old textile factory and it is part of the Roman Catholic Archdiocese of Medellín.

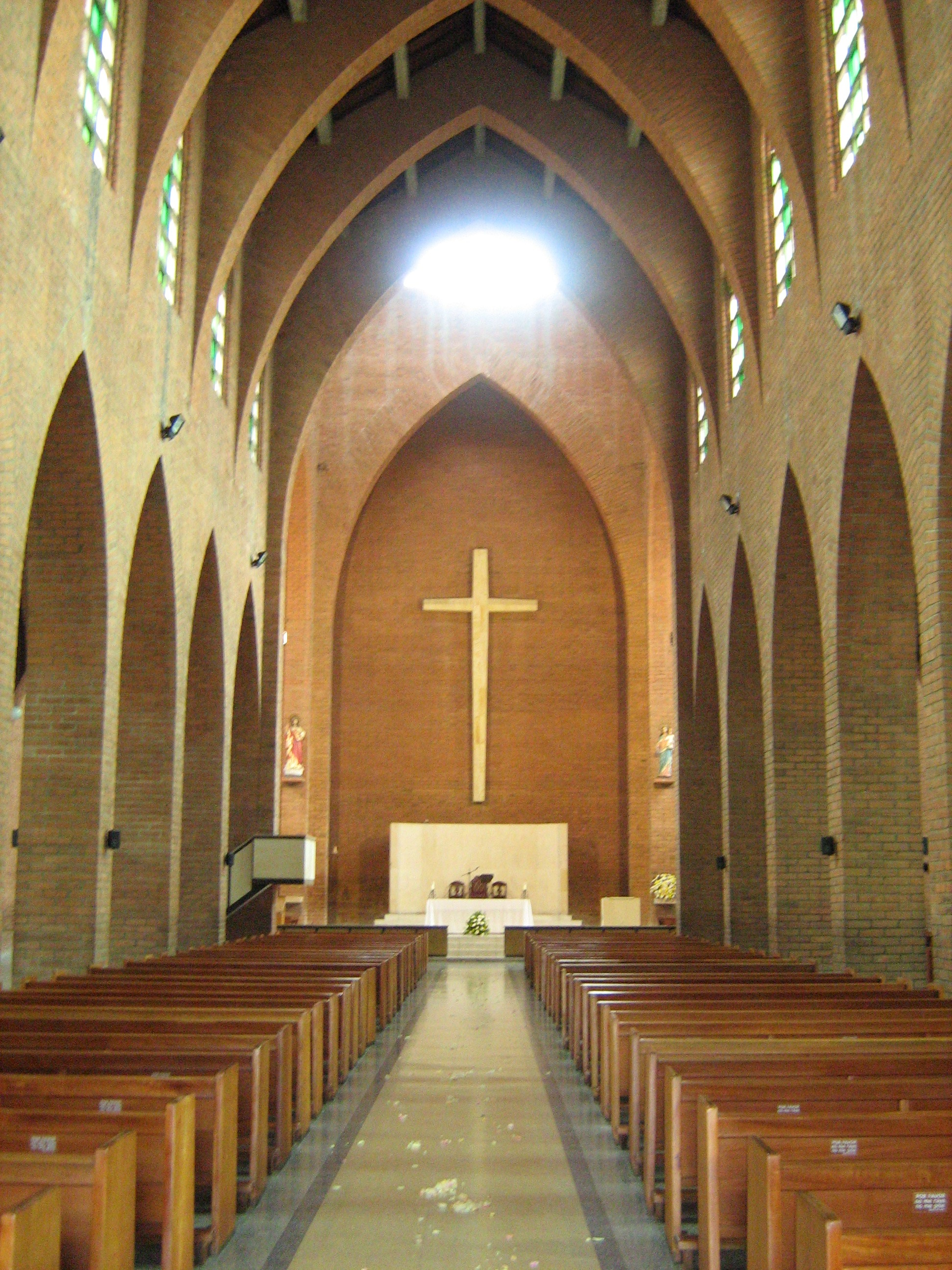
Central nave.

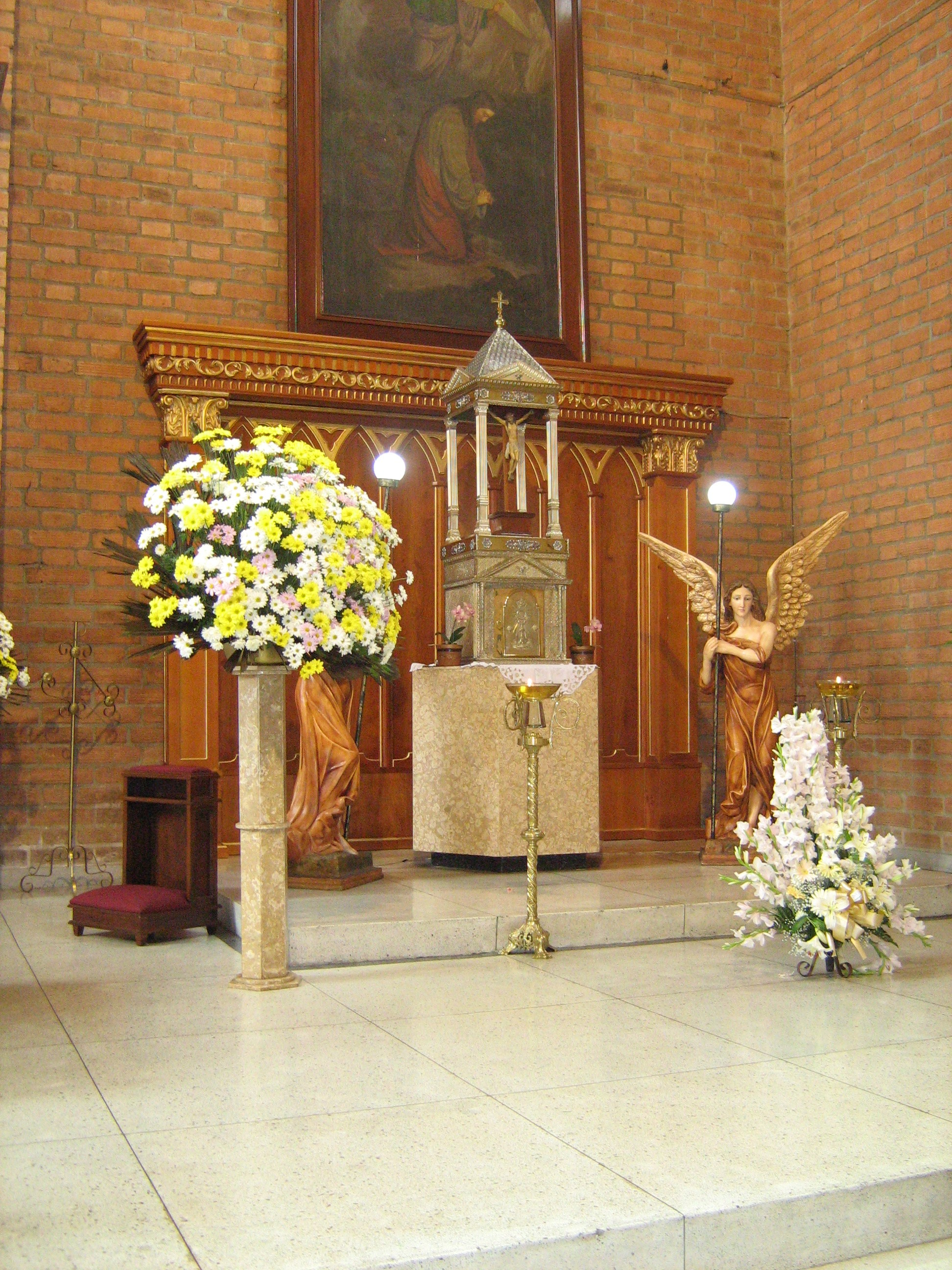
Church tabernacle.

== History ==
A farm beside the highway near the textile factory was donated to the parish by the Rendón sisters, Elvira & Lucrecia. The parson, Jesus Antonio Duque, the parson, wanted build a new temple on the farm due to the increase in the number of people leaving near the factory. St Joseph was elected as patron saint by Duque's secretary because traditionally St Joseph is the lawyer and friend of the workers. Duque requested permission on May 29 of 1947, and the archdiocese named an assembly for the building with Jesus Antonio Duque, Francisco Restrepo Molina, Julio Uribe Estrada, Aquilino Saldarriaga Ochoa, Nemesio Álvarez and Pastor Garcés Londoño as members.

The plains was commended to an engineer sign, Colombiana de construcciones, and the direction was assigned to Jesus M. Velez. During the building process, some earthquakes occurred, but the church was not affected. When the two lateral naves were finished, Duque began the masses on Sundays and holidays, starting on November 7, 1952. In December 1955 the new parish was erected by the archbishop and Antonio J. Gonzalez became the new parson on January 29 1956. Later, the church was adorned by Gonzalez.

== See also ==
- Saint Gertrude's Church
