= Sabaneta, Antioquia =

- Municipality and town
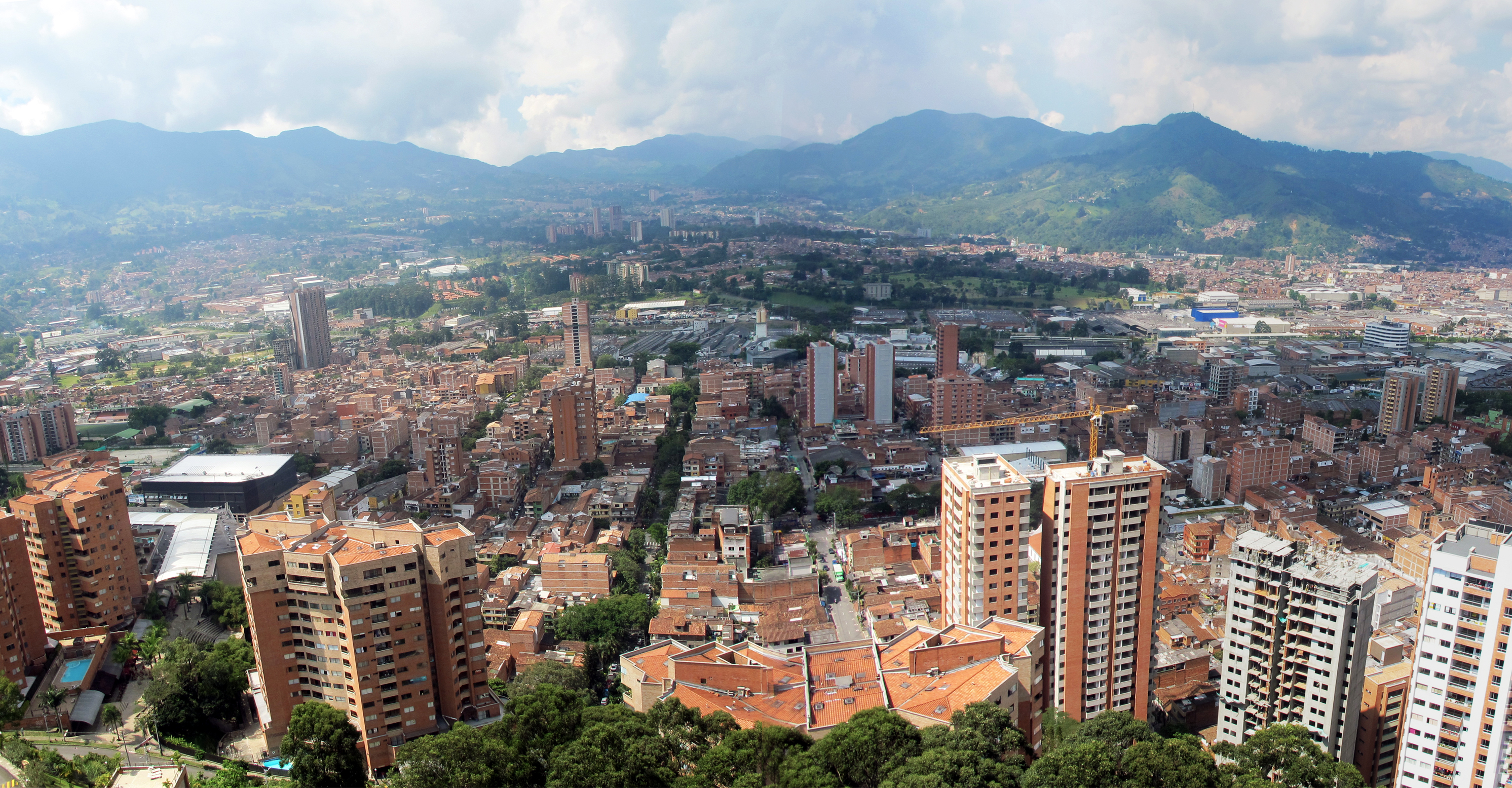

- Flag Coat of arms

- Location of the municipality and town of Sabaneta, Antioquia in the Antioquia Department of Colombia

- Location in Colombia
- Coordinates: 6°09′N 75°36′W
- Country: Colombia
- Department: Antioquia Department
- Founded: 1903

Government
  - Mayor: Santiago Montoya

Area
  - Municipality and town: 15 km^{2} (5.8 sq mi)
  - Urban: 4.53 km^{2} (1.75 sq mi)
- Elevation: 1,550 m (5,090 ft)

Population (2018 census)
  - Municipality and town: 82,375
  - Density: 5,500/km^{2} (14,000/sq mi)
  - Urban: 70,401
  - Urban density: 15,500/km^{2} (40,300/sq mi)
- Demonym: Sabaneteño
- Time zone: UTC-5 (Colombia Standard Time)
- Area code: 57 + 4
- Website: Official website (in Spanish)

Sabaneta is a municipality of Colombia, located in the Aburrá Valley of the Antioquia department. It is bordered on the north by the municipalities of La Estrella, Itagüí and Envigado, on the east by Envigado, on the south by Caldas, and on the west by La Estrella.

It is the smallest municipality in Colombia, with an area of only 15 km^{2}. It is known as the Municipio Modelo de Colombia ("Model Municipality of Colombia") or the Vallecito de Encanto ("Charming little Valley"). The municipality owes its name to the diminutive "sabana," a Spanish word meaning "savannah".

The population receives an influx of visitors on the weekends because of its reputation for having outstanding entertainment venues.

== History ==
Sabaneta was initially inhabited by the Anacona indigenous peoples (aboriginals from the other side of the Aná), who settled the eastern slope, starting from the hill of Pan de Azucar. In 1750, Spanish families settled here. The Montoya, Restrepo, Vélez, Díaz, Díez, Vásquez, Guzmán, Garcés, Baena, Salazar, Mejía, Mesas, Álvarez and Soto families were the second group to populate this region.

== Geography ==
Sabaneta, which sits at the south end of the Aburrá Valley, is part of the process of conurbation of the Medellín Metropolitan Area, being located 14 kilometers from the center of the city of Medellín. The municipality has an area of 15 km^{2}, of which 67% of the territory is urban.

Its topography varies from flat reliefs and slight hills to places with steep slopes. Its most notable heights are those of Piedras Blancas (2,650 mamsl) in La Romera, the Cuchilla Santa Teresa (2,200 mamsl), the hill of Los Gallinazos in Pan de Azúcar (1,800 mamsl), the hill Morrón, La Siberia and the Ancón.

The main stream is the Medellín River, which serves as its border with the municipality Itagüí. The most important tributary of this river, in the municipality, is the La Doctora gorge, along with the streams Buenavista, La Escuela, El Gusano, El Canalón, La Honda, La Sabanetica and La Cien Pesos, which mark its borders with Envigado.
