= Girardota =

- Municipality and town
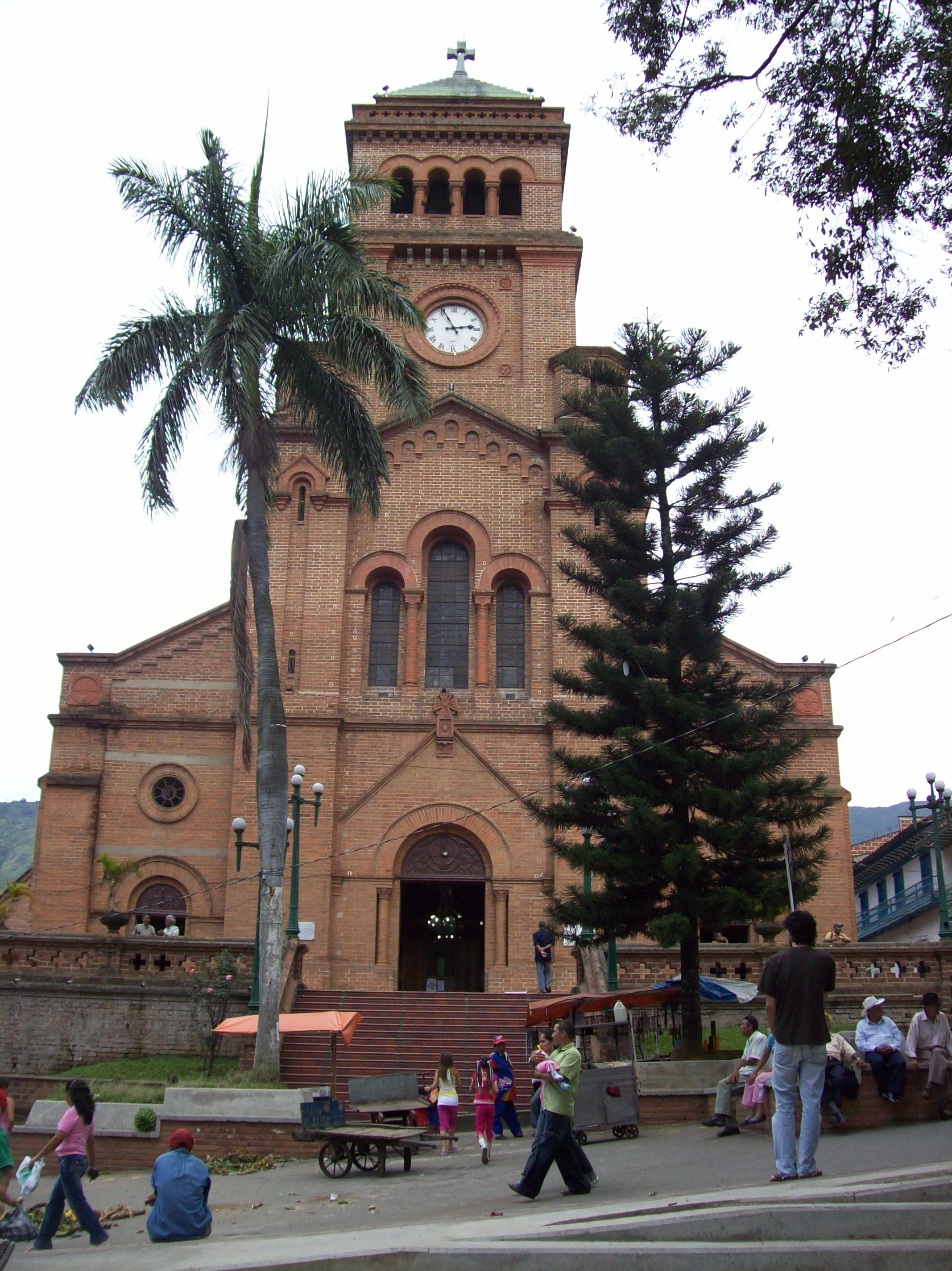

- Flag Coat of arms

- Location of the municipality and town of Girardota in the Antioquia Department of Colombia

- Location in Colombia
- Coordinates: 6°22′35.01″N 75°26′50.23″W
- Country: Colombia
- Department: Antioquia Department

Area
  - Municipality and town: 82.86 km^{2} (31.99 sq mi)
  - Urban: 3.77 km^{2} (1.46 sq mi)

Population (2020 est.)
  - Municipality and town: 54,439
  - Density: 657.0/km^{2} (1,702/sq mi)
  - Urban: 30,958
  - Urban density: 8,210/km^{2} (21,300/sq mi)
- Time zone: UTC-5 (Colombia Standard Time)

Girardota is a town and municipality in Antioquia Department, Colombia. Girardota is part of The Metropolitan Area of the Aburrá Valley. Its population was estimated to be 54,439 in 2020.

== Climate ==
Climate data for Girardota/Barbosa (Progreso El Hda), elevation 1,500 m (4,900 ft), (1981–2010)
| Month | Jan | Feb | Mar | Apr | May | Jun | Jul | Aug | Sep | Oct | Nov | Dec | Year |
|---|---|---|---|---|---|---|---|---|---|---|---|---|---|
| Mean daily maximum °C (°F) | 28.1 (82.6) | 28.5 (83.3) | 28.8 (83.8) | 27.8 (82.0) | 28.1 (82.6) | 28.3 (82.9) | 28.3 (82.9) | 28.5 (83.3) | 28.1 (82.6) | 27.2 (81.0) | 27.1 (80.8) | 27.4 (81.3) | 28 (82) |
| Daily mean °C (°F) | 21.9 (71.4) | 22.2 (72.0) | 22.3 (72.1) | 22.1 (71.8) | 22.1 (71.8) | 22.2 (72.0) | 22.1 (71.8) | 22.2 (72.0) | 22.0 (71.6) | 21.7 (71.1) | 21.7 (71.1) | 21.7 (71.1) | 22 (72) |
| Mean daily minimum °C (°F) | 16.1 (61.0) | 16.1 (61.0) | 16.4 (61.5) | 16.9 (62.4) | 17.0 (62.6) | 16.5 (61.7) | 16.0 (60.8) | 16.2 (61.2) | 16.3 (61.3) | 16.5 (61.7) | 16.7 (62.1) | 16.6 (61.9) | 16.4 (61.5) |
| Average precipitation mm (inches) | 57.5 (2.26) | 80.1 (3.15) | 113.2 (4.46) | 188.6 (7.43) | 246.8 (9.72) | 199.1 (7.84) | 207.6 (8.17) | 202.3 (7.96) | 234.2 (9.22) | 235.4 (9.27) | 155.0 (6.10) | 83.3 (3.28) | 2,003 (78.9) |
| Average precipitation days (≥ 1.0 mm) | 8 | 10 | 13 | 20 | 21 | 18 | 19 | 18 | 20 | 22 | 18 | 11 | 193 |
| Average relative humidity (%) | 82 | 81 | 81 | 83 | 84 | 82 | 81 | 81 | 82 | 83 | 83 | 83 | 82 |
Source: Instituto de Hidrologia Meteorologia y Estudios Ambientales
