= Eladio Vélez =

Colombian painter

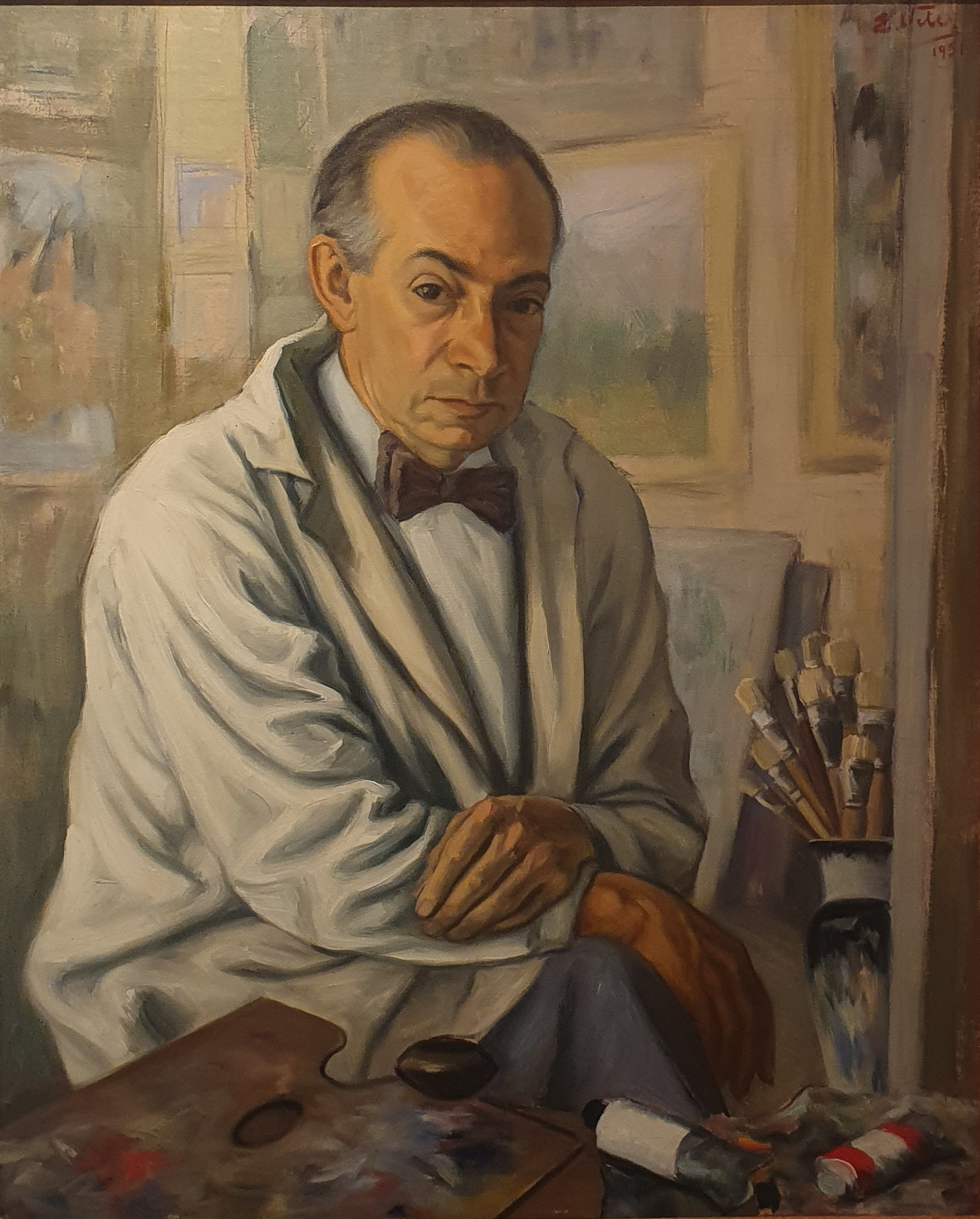
- Self-portrait (1930)
- Born: September 22, 1897; Itagüí, Colombia
- Died: July 23, 1967 (aged 69); Medellín, Colombia

Eladio Vélez (September 22, 1897 – July 23, 1967) was a Colombian painter.

== Life ==
Vélez was born in Itagüí, Antioquia on September 22, 1897 and died in Medellín, Antioquia on July 23, 1967. He is considered one of the most representative artists in the city of Itagüí.

His works embrace a theme sometimes considered inconsequential: rural landscapes, city streets, daily life, in which displays realistic technique that values color, plasticity and careful brushstrokes in the oil and the watercolor technique with which he founded with his friend Pedro Nel Gómez, the Antioquia Art School.
