= Envigado =

- Municipality and city
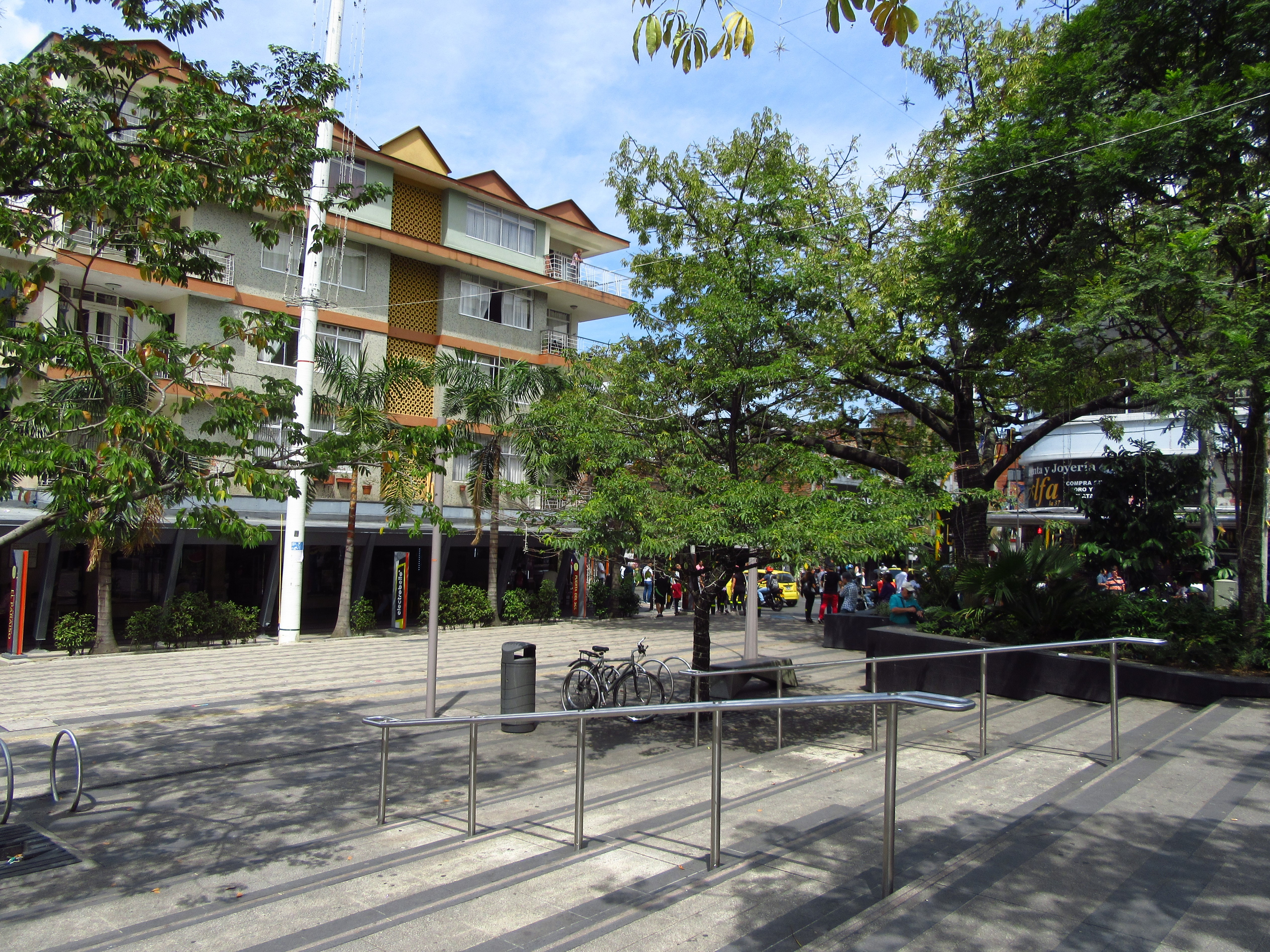

- Flag Coat of arms

- Location of the municipality and town of Envigado in the Antioquia Department of Colombia

- Location in Colombia
- Coordinates: 6°10′19″N 75°34′49″W
- Country: Colombia
- Department: Antioquia Department
- Founded: 1775

Government
  - Mayor: Braulio Espinosa

Area
  - Municipality and city: 78.78 km^{2} (30.42 sq mi)
  - Urban: 13.02 km^{2} (5.03 sq mi)
- Elevation: 1,675 m (5,495 ft)

Population (2018 census)
  - Municipality and city: 228,848
  - Density: 2,905/km^{2} (7,524/sq mi)
  - Urban: 215,766
  - Urban density: 16,570/km^{2} (42,920/sq mi)
  - Metro: 3,312,165
- Demonym: Envigadeño
- Time zone: UTC-5 (Colombia Standard Time)
- Area code: 57 + 4
- Website: (in Spanish)

Envigado (Spanish pronunciation: [embiˈɣaðo]) is a city and municipality due South of Medellín, Colombia in the department of Antioquia. It is located in the Metropolitan Area of the Aburrá Valley. It borders El Poblado, Medellín to the north, Sabaneta to the south, El Retiro and Caldas to the east, and Itagüí to the west.

Envigado is known for maintaining the traditions of the Paisa Region and for its architecture. It also has one of the highest standards of living in Colombia, and (according to the Colombian magazine Semana), has the country's lowest rate of what the magazine calls, "people with unmet basic needs".

Its recent history is closely associated with Pablo Escobar and the Medellin cartel. Despite its connection with Escobar, the Aburrá Valley now has one of the lowest homicide rates in Colombia: 6 for every 100,000 people,

Envigado is the hometown of the Colombian writer and philosopher Fernando González. His house, Otraparte, today is a cultural center and museum dedicated to his memory and works.

== Demographics ==
Envigado neighborhoods.

The population in the 1993 census was 115,484 inhabitants, and in 2012, it had a population of 199,276. In 2013, Envigado was estimated to have a total population of 212,437 according to a projection from a 2018 DANE census.

Envigado's demonym is "Envigadeño."

== History ==
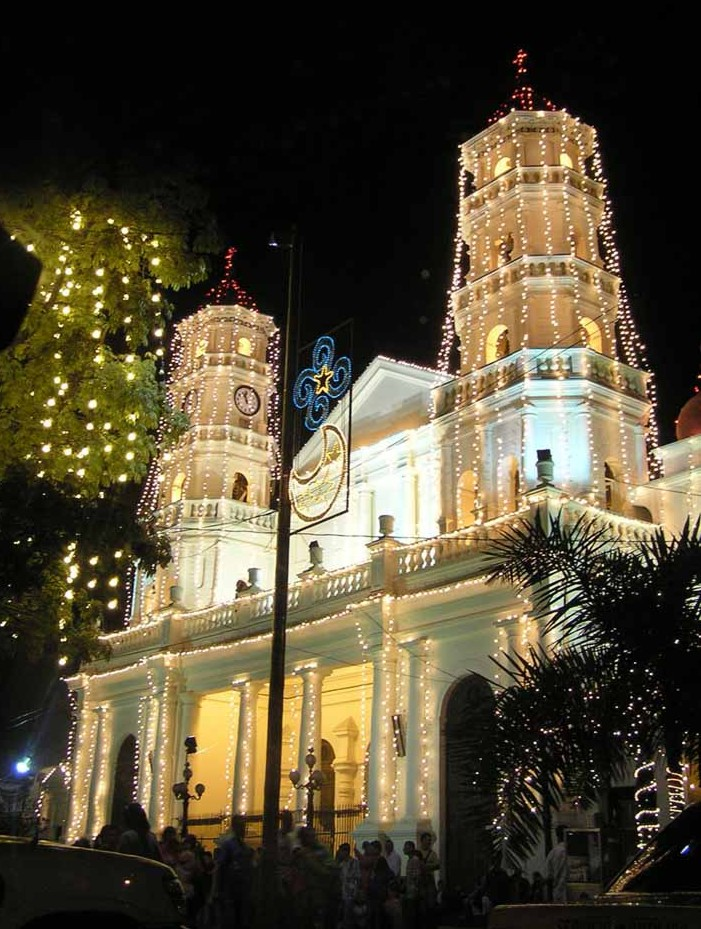
Iglesia de Santa Gertrudis

Envigado was founded in 1775 and was declared a municipality in 1814. The founders were José Antonio Isaza y Atuesta, Lucas de Ochoa y Tirado, and Vicente Restrepo.

Some researchers suggest that its name comes from the large trees that were once found there and which were used for the rafters (vigas) in constructing houses.

Spaniards in search of gold arrived in the Aburrá Valley for the first time in August of the year 1541. They left only a month after to continue their quest for gold, but returned 90 years later, at the beginning of the 17th century, to stay.

The rural Envigado was inhabited by wealthy Spanish families, which lived in prosperous residences that produced nourishment for Antioquia for about 150 years.

The urban Envigado only appeared after 1775 with the creation of the Santa Gertrudis Parish, which is now in the center of Downtown Envigado known as "El Parque de Envigado."

On July 10, 2016 Envigado became part of the Metropolitan Area, which brings together the other nine municipalities of the region - Caldas, La Estrella, Sabaneta, Itagüí, Medellín, Bello, Copacabana, Girardota, Barbosa.

== Economy ==
Manufacturing is the main economic activity. This includes the Renault-Toyota assembly plant Sofasa. In addition, Envigado hosts the headquarters of Almacenes Exito, the largest chain of supermarkets of Colombia, particularly for textiles, soaps, and perfumes.

== Sports ==
Envigado is home to a football (soccer) team called Envigado Fútbol Club which plays in the Colombian first division.

== Inder Envigado ==
Inder Envigado is Envigado's Institute of Sports, Recreation, and Good Use of Free Time, which was founded as a decentralized institution on June 25, 1998. Its purpose is offering the community sporting and recreational activities in an effort to strengthen Envigado's human development. It has multiple sports venues as the Envigado Recreational Park, Alto De Los Sueños, Centro Polideportivo Las Cometas and the main venue Polideportivo Sur de Envigado, that is equipped with multiple sports courts including a BMX place for earlier training of Olympics gold medalist Mariana Pajón, Estadio Polideportivo Sur, Olimpic Swimming pool.

One of Inder's main projects is Envigado's cycleway, which is a weekly activity that takes place Sundays from 7 a.m. to 1 p.m. During that time, Inder restricts the passage of vehicles on one Envigado's main streets, La Avenida del Poblado, and opens it exclusively to Envigadeños for running, biking, skating and walking. Inder also offers several activities on the cycleway, such as outdoor community Yoga and Zumba sessions.

== See also ==
- Saint Joseph's Church, Envigado
