= Copacabana (Antioquia) =

- Municipality and town
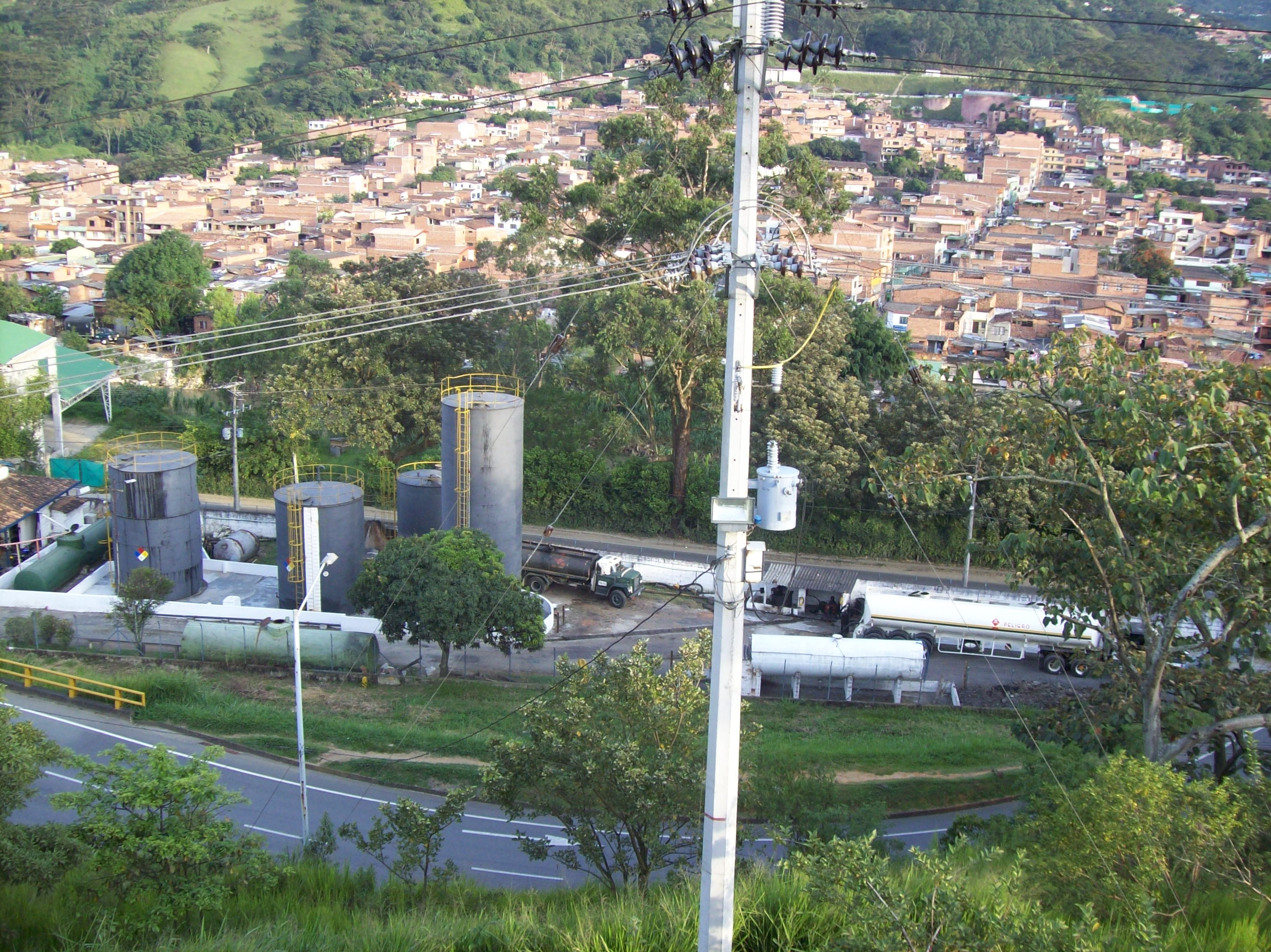

- Flag Coat of arms

- Location of the municipality and town of Copacabana, Antioquia in the Antioquia Department of Colombia

- Location in Colombia
- Coordinates: 6°20′N 75°30′W
- Country: Colombia
- Department: Antioquia Department
- Founded: 1615

Government
  - Mayor: Augusto Hector Monsalve

Area
  - Municipality and town: 67.76 km^{2} (26.16 sq mi)
  - Urban: 7.62 km^{2} (2.94 sq mi)
- Elevation: 1,454 m (4,770 ft)

Population (2018 census)
  - Municipality and town: 77,884
  - Density: 1,149/km^{2} (2,977/sq mi)
  - Urban: 62,343
  - Urban density: 8,180/km^{2} (21,200/sq mi)
- Demonym: Copacabanese
- Time zone: UTC-5 (Colombia Standard Time)
- Area code: 57 + 4
- Website: Official website (in Spanish)

Copacabana is a town and municipality in the Colombian department of Antioquia. Founded in 1615, Copacabana is part of the Metropolitan Area of the Aburrá Valley.
