= Heliconia, Antioquia =

- Municipality and town
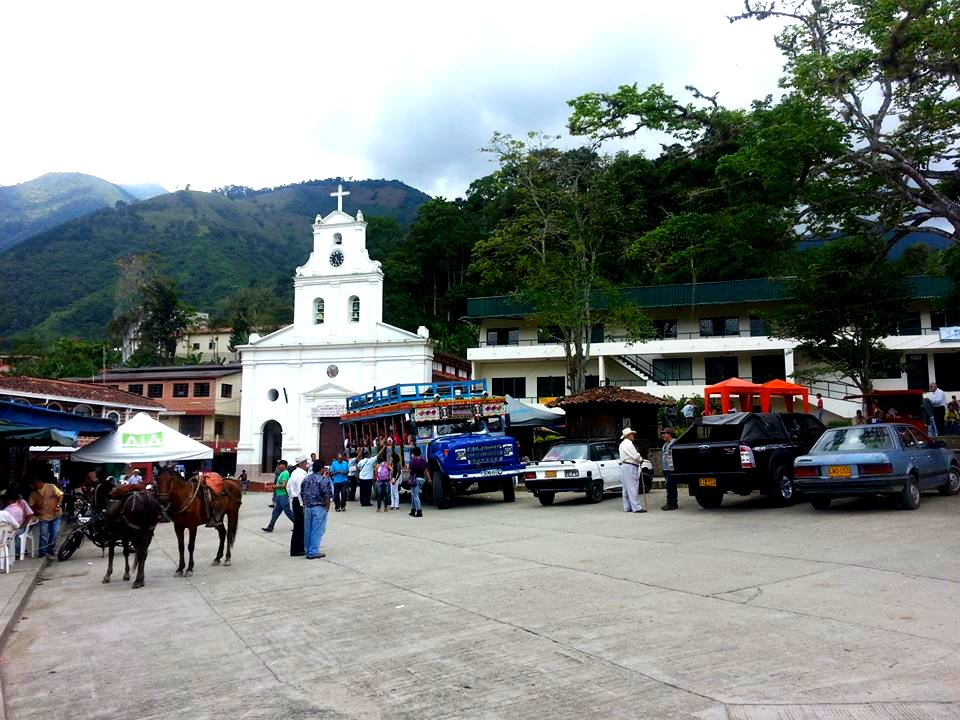

- Flag Coat of arms

- Location of the municipality and town of Heliconia, Antioquia in the Antioquia Department of Colombia

- Location in Colombia
- Coordinates: 6°13′0″N 75°44′0″W
- Country: Colombia
- Department: Antioquia Department
- Subregion: Western
- Time zone: UTC-5 (Colombia Standard Time)

Heliconia is a town and municipality in Antioquia Department, Colombia.

== Climate ==
Heliconia has a relatively cool tropical rainforest climate (Af). It has heavy rainfall year round. The average temperature is around 27.7 °C (81.9 °F), and the average annual rainfall is 3,054 mm (120.28 inches).

Climate data for Heliconia
Month	Jan	Feb	Mar	Apr	May	Jun	Jul	Aug	Sep	Oct	Nov	Dec	Year
Mean daily maximum °C (°F)	27.9 (82.2)	28.3 (82.9)	28.7 (83.7)	28.2 (82.8)	27.5 (81.5)	27.6 (81.7)	28.2 (82.8)	28.0 (82.4)	27.4 (81.3)	26.9 (80.4)	26.9 (80.4)	26.9 (80.4)	27.7 (81.9)
Daily mean °C (°F)	21.6 (70.9)	22.1 (71.8)	22.5 (72.5)	22.5 (72.5)	22.1 (71.8)	21.9 (71.4)	22.0 (71.6)	22.0 (71.6)	21.6 (70.9)	21.5 (70.7)	21.6 (70.9)	21.3 (70.3)	21.9 (71.4)
Mean daily minimum °C (°F)	15.4 (59.7)	15.9 (60.6)	16.4 (61.5)	16.8 (62.2)	16.8 (62.2)	16.2 (61.2)	15.9 (60.6)	16.0 (60.8)	15.8 (60.4)	16.1 (61.0)	16.3 (61.3)	15.7 (60.3)	16.1 (61.0)
Average rainfall mm (inches)	139.2 (5.48)	143.9 (5.67)	231.3 (9.11)	325.7 (12.82)	365.0 (14.37)	247.8 (9.76)	197.0 (7.76)	238.9 (9.41)	314.8 (12.39)	370.6 (14.59)	303.4 (11.94)	177.2 (6.98)	3,054.8 (120.28)
Average rainy days	10	12	15	20	20	16	14	16	19	22	19	14	197
Source 1:
Source 2:
