= Barbosa, Antioquia =

- Municipality and town
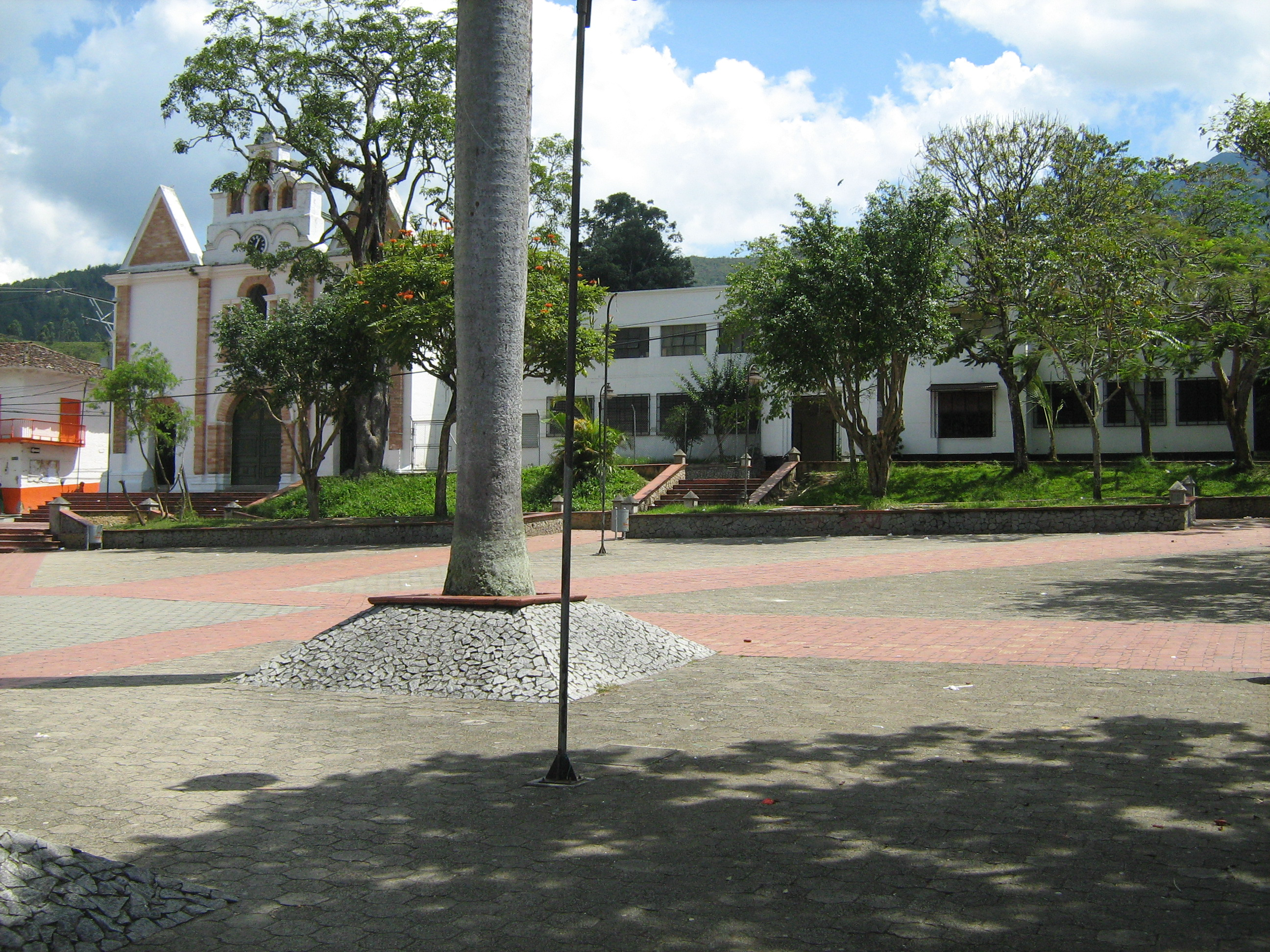

- Flag Coat of arms

- Location of the municipality and town of Barbosa, Antioquia in the Antioquia Department of Colombia

- Location in Colombia
- Coordinates: 6°26′20.4″N 75°19′58.8″W
- Country: Colombia
- Department: Antioquia Department

Area
  - Municipality and town: 205.7 km^{2} (79.4 sq mi)
  - Urban: 2.79 km^{2} (1.08 sq mi)

Population (2020 est.)
  - Municipality and town: 54,347
  - Density: 264.2/km^{2} (684.3/sq mi)
  - Urban: 23,921
  - Urban density: 8,570/km^{2} (22,200/sq mi)
- Time zone: UTC-5 (Colombia Standard Time)
- Climate: Af

Barbosa is a town and municipality in Antioquia Department, Colombia. Situated 39 km from Medellín's downtown, it is one of the municipalities of the Metropolitan Area of the Aburrá Valley. The population was estimated to be 54,347 in 2020. It is known as the Gateway to the Northeast, famous for its lakes and streams. A traditional Pineapple Festival is held here in December and a Train Festival in the district of El Hatillo in August.

== Climate ==
Climate data for Barbosa (Progreso El Hda), elevation 1,500 m (4,900 ft), (1981–2010)
Month	Jan	Feb	Mar	Apr	May	Jun	Jul	Aug	Sep	Oct	Nov	Dec	Year
Mean daily maximum °C (°F)	28.1 (82.6)	28.5 (83.3)	28.8 (83.8)	27.8 (82.0)	28.1 (82.6)	28.3 (82.9)	28.3 (82.9)	28.5 (83.3)	28.1 (82.6)	27.2 (81.0)	27.1 (80.8)	27.4 (81.3)	28 (82)
Daily mean °C (°F)	21.9 (71.4)	22.2 (72.0)	22.3 (72.1)	22.1 (71.8)	22.1 (71.8)	22.2 (72.0)	22.1 (71.8)	22.2 (72.0)	22.0 (71.6)	21.7 (71.1)	21.7 (71.1)	21.7 (71.1)	22 (72)
Mean daily minimum °C (°F)	16.1 (61.0)	16.1 (61.0)	16.4 (61.5)	16.9 (62.4)	17.0 (62.6)	16.5 (61.7)	16.0 (60.8)	16.2 (61.2)	16.3 (61.3)	16.5 (61.7)	16.7 (62.1)	16.6 (61.9)	16.4 (61.5)
Average precipitation mm (inches)	57.5 (2.26)	80.1 (3.15)	113.2 (4.46)	188.6 (7.43)	246.8 (9.72)	199.1 (7.84)	207.6 (8.17)	202.3 (7.96)	234.2 (9.22)	235.4 (9.27)	155.0 (6.10)	83.3 (3.28)	2,003 (78.9)
Average precipitation days (≥ 1.0 mm)	8	10	13	20	21	18	19	18	20	22	18	11	193
Average relative humidity (%)	82	81	81	83	84	82	81	81	82	83	83	83	82
Source: Instituto de Hidrologia Meteorologia y Estudios Ambientales
