= List of festivals in Colombia =

Festivals of Colombia
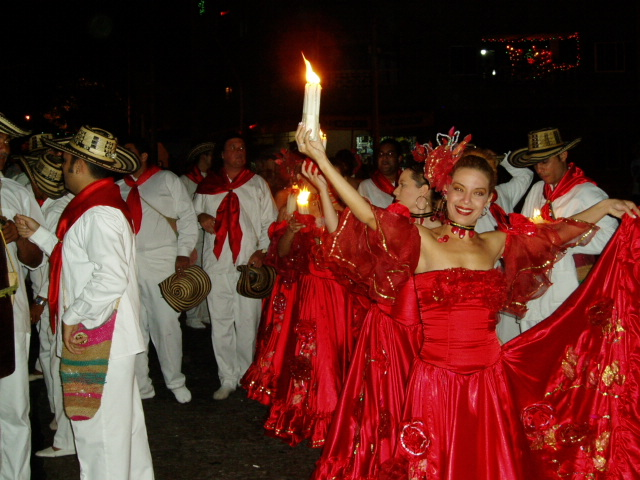
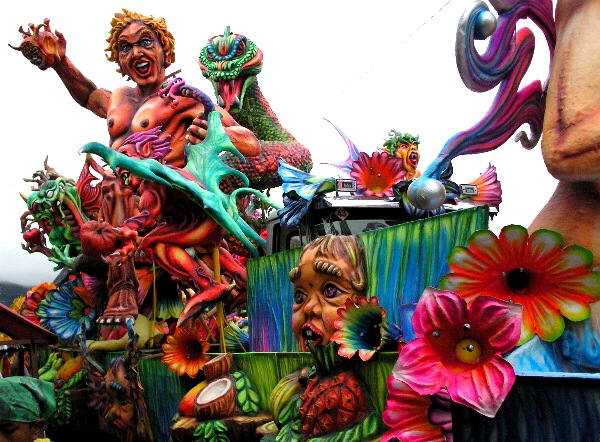
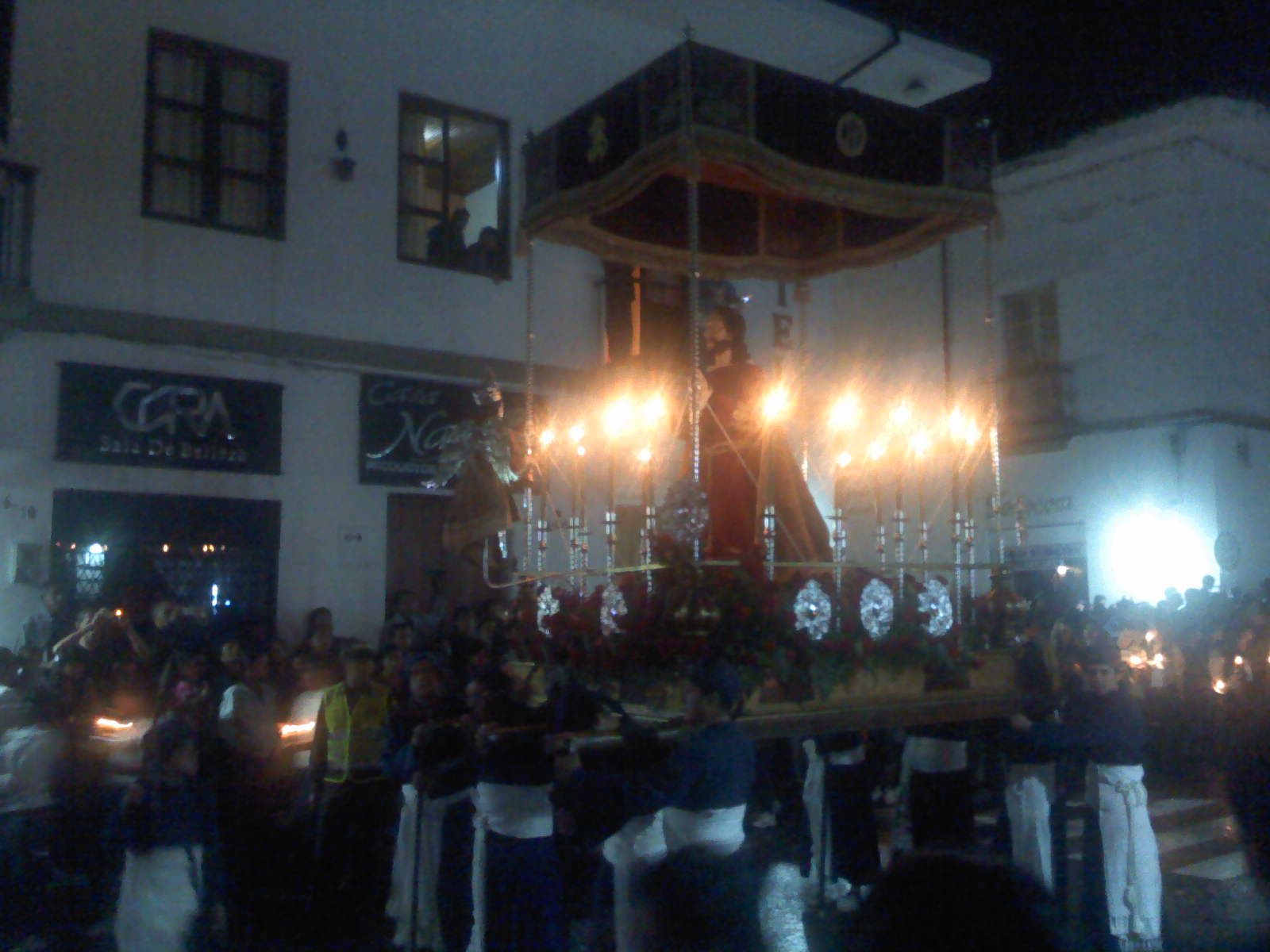
- Top: Barranquilla's Carnival; Center: Blacks and Whites' Carnival; Bottom: Holy Week in Popayán

General Information
- Subtopics: Carnival in Colombia
- Location: Colombia
- Related: Music of Colombia, cumbia, vallenato

The following is a list of festivals in Colombia, including arts festivals, music festivals, folk festivals, and cultural festivals, among other types.

== Festivals by type ==
=== Traditional and cultural Colombian festivals ===
January

- Campeonato de Voleibol Playa - Cartagena - Bolívar
- Carnaval de Blancos y Negros - Pasto - Nariño
- Carnaval de Riosucio - Riosucio - Caldas
- Carnavales de Ocaña - Norte de Santander
- Cartagena Festival Internacional de Música - Cartagena - Bolívar
- Feria de Cali - Cali - Valle del Cauca
- Feria de Manizales - Manizales - Caldas
- Feria Taurina - Cartagena - Bolívar
- Feria Taurina de la Candelaria - Medellín - Antioquia
- Festival de la Miel - Oiba - Santander
- Festival de La Panela - Villeta - Cundinamarca
- Fiesta de las Corralejas - Sincelejo
- Hay Festival - Cartagena - Bolívar
- Reinado del Arroz - Aguazul - Casanare
- Reinado Departamental de la Panela - Villeta
- Sirenato del Mar - Tolu

February

- Carnaval de Barranquilla - Barranquilla - Atlántico
- Carnaval del Fuego - Tumaco - Nariño
- Feria Taurina Bogotá
- Festival de la Subienda - Honda - Tolima
- Festival del Corrido Llanero - Puerto Carreño - Vichada
- Fiesta de la Candelaria - Cartagena - Bolívar
- Temporada Taurina - Medellín - Antioquia

March

- Exposición Internacional de Orquídeas - Medellín
- Ferias y Fiestas - Acacías - Meta
- Festival de la Canción Llanera - Villavicencio - Meta
- Festival de Música Religiosa - Popayan - Mompox - Pamplona
- Festival del Burro - San Antero - Cordoba
- Festival Iberoamericano de Teatro - Bogotá
- Festival internacional de cine - Cartagena
- Holy Week in Popayán

April

- Feria del Cebú - San Martín - Meta
- Festival de Cine Eurocine - Bogotá
- Festival de Luna Verde - San Andrés
- Festival del Cangrejo - San Andrés Islas
- Festival Internacional de la Leyenda Vallenata - Valledupar

May

- Feria Ganadera - Socorro - Santader
- Feria Internacional del Libro - Bogotá
- Ferias y Fiestas de Natagaima - Tolima
- Festival de Interpretes de la Canción Mono Nuñez - Ginebra - Valle
- Festival de la Arepa de Huevo - Luruaco - Atlántico
- Festival de la Cachama - Puerto Gaitan - Meta
- Festival de la Cultura Wayuú - Guajira
- Fiestas del San Pedro y Festival del Bunde Tolimense - Espinal - Tolima

June

- Corpus Christi - Anolaima
- Feria Nacional Gallistica - Monteria
- Festival del Mango - San Antonio Atlántico
- Festival del Mono Nuñez - Ginebra - Valle
- Festival Folclórico - Ibague Tolima
- Festival Folclórico del Caqueta - Florencia Caqueta
- Festival Folclorico y Reinado Nacional del Bambuco - Neiva - Huila
- Festival Internacional de Jazz - Villa de Leyva
- Festival Internacional de Tango - Medellín
- Festival Nacional del Porro - San Pelayo - Monteria
- Festival y Reinado del Divivi - Rioacha - Guajira
- Reinado Nacional de la Ganadería - Monteria - Córdoba
- Reinado Nacional del Bambuco - Neiva - Huila
- Reinado Nacional del Cafe - Calarca - Quindio

July

- Feria Agropecuaria - Charalá - Santander
- Feria de la Piña - Lebrija - Santander
- Ferias y Fiestas de la Panela - Convención - Santander
- Festival de la Cumbia - El Banco - Magdalena
- Festival de la Feijoa - Tibasosa, Boyacá
- Festival del sol y del acero - Sogamoso, Boyacá
- Fiestas del mar - Santa Marta
- International Poetry Festival of Medellín
- Opera al Parque - Bogotá
- Torneo Internacional del Joropo - Villavicencio

August

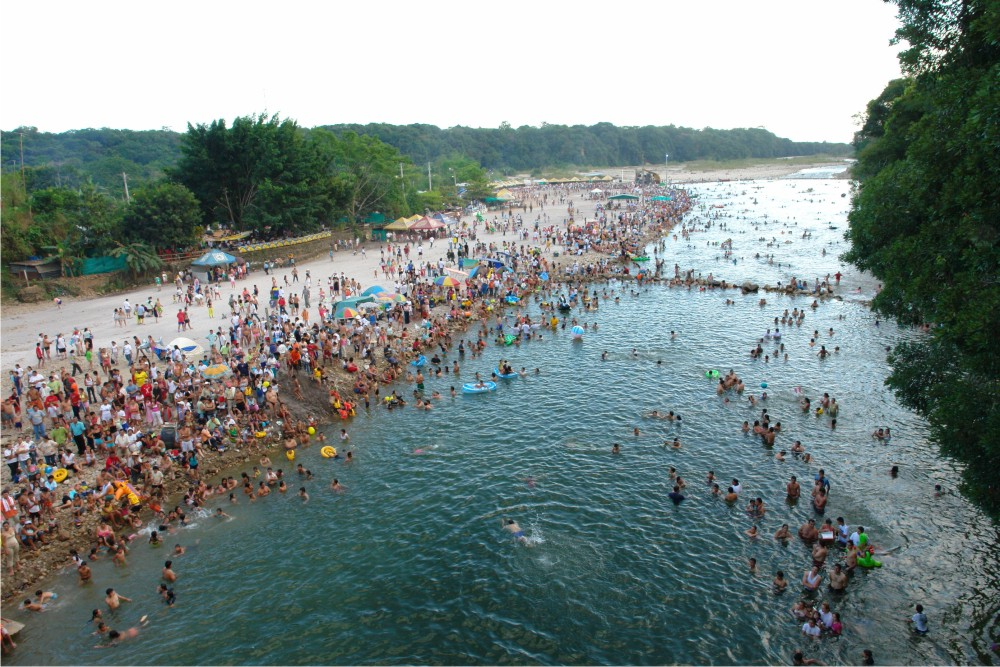
Festival de verano rio Tùa

- Boyacá International Cultural Festival - Tunja, Boyacá
- Colombiamoda - Medellín
- Desfile de Silleteros - Medellín
- Feria de las Flores - Medellín
- Festibuga - Buga - Valle Del Cauca
- Festival de Cometas - Villa De Leyva
- Festival de la Bahía - Bahía Solano
- Festival de Tiple y la Guabina - Veléz - Santander
- Festival de Verano - Bogotá
- Festival Folclórico del Litoral Pacifico - Buenaventura
- Festival Petronio Alvarez - Cali
- Fiesta del Petróleo - Barrancabermeja
- Fiestas de La Cosecha - Pereira, Risaralda
- Fiestas del Maíz - Sonsón, Antioquia
- Fiestas Folclóricas - Capitanejo - Santander

September

- Boyacá International Cultural Festival - Tunja, Boyacá
- Concurso Nacional de bandas - Paipa, Boyaca
- Feria Bonita - Bucaramanga
- Festival Cuna de Acordeones - Villa Nueva - Guajira
- Festival de la Talla en Piedra - Barichara
- Festival de la Trova - Medellín
- Festival de Música Folclórica - Socorro - Santander
- Festival Internacional del Jazz del Teatro Libre - Bogotá
- Festival Latinoamericano de Teatro - Manizales - Caldas
- Fiestas de San Pacho - Quibdó - Chocó
- Green Moon Festival - San Andrés Islas
- Jazz al Parque - Bogotá

October

- Concurso Nacional de Duos - Armenia - Quindio
- Encuentro Mundial de Coleo - Villavicencio - Meta
- Feria Internacional de Bogotá
- Festival de Cine - Bogotá
- Festival Latinoamericano de Danzas Folclóricas - Guacarí - Valle del Cuaca
- Festival Nacional de Gaitas - Ovejas - Sucre
- Festival y Reinado Nacional del Carbón - Barrancas - Guajira)
- Reinado Nacional de la Cosecha - Granada - Meta
- Reinado Nacional de Turismo - Girardot - Cundinamarca
- Reinado Nacional del Turismo - Girardot - Cundinamarca

November

- Concurso Nacional de Belleza - Cartagena
- Festival del Caballo - Villa de Leyva
- Festival Internacional de Cine Independiente - Villa de Leyva
- Festival Internacional Folclórico y Turístico del Llano - San Martin - Meta
- Fiesta Nacional de la Agricultura - Palmira - Valle
- Reinado Internacional de Coco - San Andres

December

- Aguinaldo Boyacense - Tunja
- Desfile de Danzas, Mitos y Leyendas - Medellin
- Expoartesanias - Bogotá - CORFERIAS
- Feria de Cali - Cali
- Festival de Arte "Memoria e Imaginacion" - Cartagena
- Festival de Luces - Villa De Leyva
- Fiesta de Velas y Faroles - Quimbaya Quindio
- Torneo Internacional de Contrapuenteo y La Voz Recia - Yopal Arauca

=== Regional and folkloric festivities ===
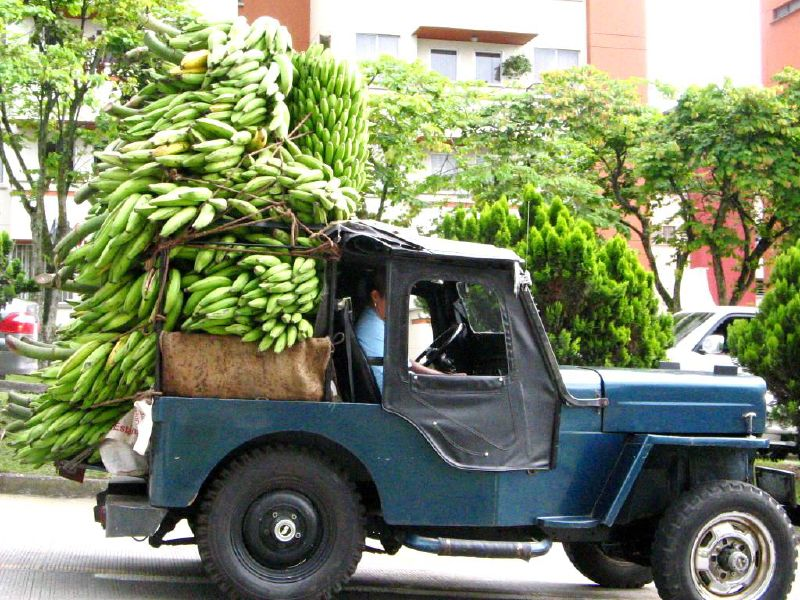
El Yipao (the jeep parade)

- Candles and Lanterns Festival (Spanish: Fiesta de Velas y Faroles) is held in Quimbaya, Quindío on December 7 and 8. Each of the barrios in the township compete to produce the most spectacular lighting arrangements.
- Carnival of Riosucio (Spanish: Carnaval de Riosucio) held in Riosucio, Caldas within the first two weeks of January every two years. In 2009 it was held from 2 to 8 January and in 2011 from 6 to 12 January. It remembers past traditions with a mixture of art, music and costumes by groups called cuadrillas, drinking the traditional guarapo carried in calabazos. During the carnival, the image of a cool and happy devil is exhibited.
- Colombian Folklore Festival (Spanish: Festival Folklórico Colombiano) in Ibagué.
- El dia de las velas, The day of the candles held on December 7.
- Festival of the Wayuu Culture in La Guajira Department.
- Festivities of Our Lady of the Remedies in La Guajira Department.
- Green Moon Festival (Spanish: Festival de la Luna Verde) celebrated in the Archipelago of San Andrés, Providencia and Santa Catalina, this is a unique festival with characteristics that make it different from any other festival in Colombia. Here the Afro-Caribbean influence is very strong, and predominance of the English-language lyrics of Calypso and Reggae.
- Harvest Festival of Pereira (Spanish: Fiestas de la Cosecha de Pereira), in Pereira.
- Joropo National Festival (Spanish: Festival Nacional del Joropo) in Villavicencio in December.
- Medellin's Tango Street (Spanish: Tangovía) on Carlos Gardel Avenue in the suburb of Manrique.
- National Festival of the Dividivi in La Guajira Department.
- Pubenza Festivities (Spanish: Fiestas de Pubenza), in Popayán, known for its competition of Chirimias (folkloric musical groups).
- The Yipao or Jeep Parade in Armenia, Colombia

=== Film festivals ===
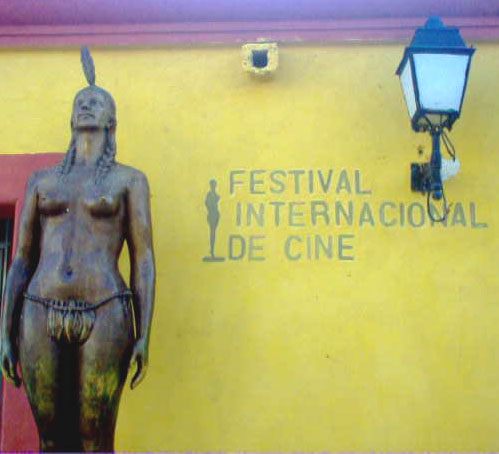
The Cartagena Film Festival is the oldest cinema event in Latin America. The central focus is on films from Ibero-America.

- Bogotá Film Festival
- Cartagena Film Festival

=== Artistic and theatre festivals ===
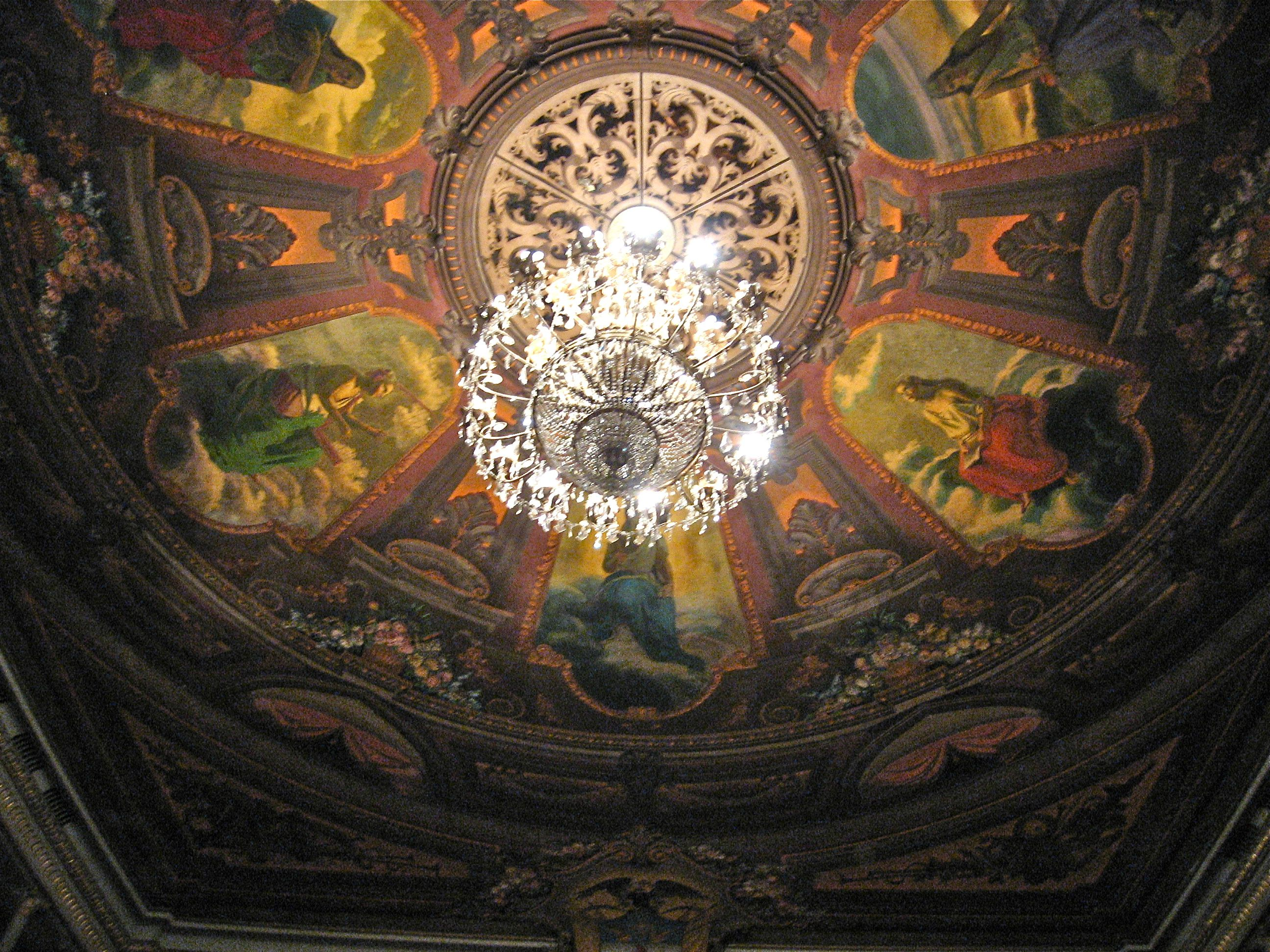
The Ibero-American Theater Festival of Bogotá is one of the biggest theater festivals in the world.

- The Boyacá International Cultural Festival (Spanish: Festival Internacional de la Cultura de Boyacá) held annually in Tunja, is one of the biggest culture and arts festivals in Latin America.
- The Ibero-American Theater Festival held in Bogotá every two years, is the biggest theater festival in the world.
- The International Festival of Theater City of Manizales

=== Music festivals ===
Folkloric and traditional

- Boyacá International Cultural Festival (Festival Internacional de la Cultura de Boyacá, Tunja.
- Colombia al Parque (Bogotá)
- Cradle of Accordions Festival (Festival Cuna de Acordeones, Villanueva, La Guajira)
- Festival Folclórico y Reinado Nacional del Bambuco (Neiva)
- Festival of the Laurels (Distracción, La Guajira)
- Pubenza Festivities (Popayán)
- Salsa al Parque (Bogotá)
- Vallenato Legend Festival (Festival de la Leyenda Vallenata, Valledupar, in April or May. The festival is a celebration of vallenato music and also a competition to find the best accordionist of the year and to select the Vallenato King (Spanish: Rey Vallenato) among hundreds of participants from all over the country.
- World Day of Laziness (Itagüí)

Other

- Baum Festival (Bogotá)
- Cali Underground (Cali)
- Estéreo Picnic Festival (Bogotá)
- Festival Internacional de Jazz (Bogotá)
- Festival Latinoamérica de Concierto (Bogotá)
- Hip Hop al Parque (Bogotá)
- Jamming Festival (Bogotá)
- Jazz al Parque (Bogotá)
- Manizales Grita Rock (Manizales)
- Ópera al Parque (Bogotá)
- Rock al Parque (Bogotá) in July, is the second largest rock festival in Latinamerica, after Rock in Rio. Around 1000 rock bands have participated in this event; both local and international bands. Apocalyptica, Slipknot, Plastilina Mosh and Manu Chao have performed in Rock al Parque, among other internationally famous bands. The event is held annually in Simón Bolívar Park in Bogotá. In 2004, 400,000 people took part in the event.
- Storyland Festival (Cartagena)

== See also ==
- List of festivals
- List of festivals in La Guajira
- List of music festivals
