= Carnival in Colombia =

Annual festival

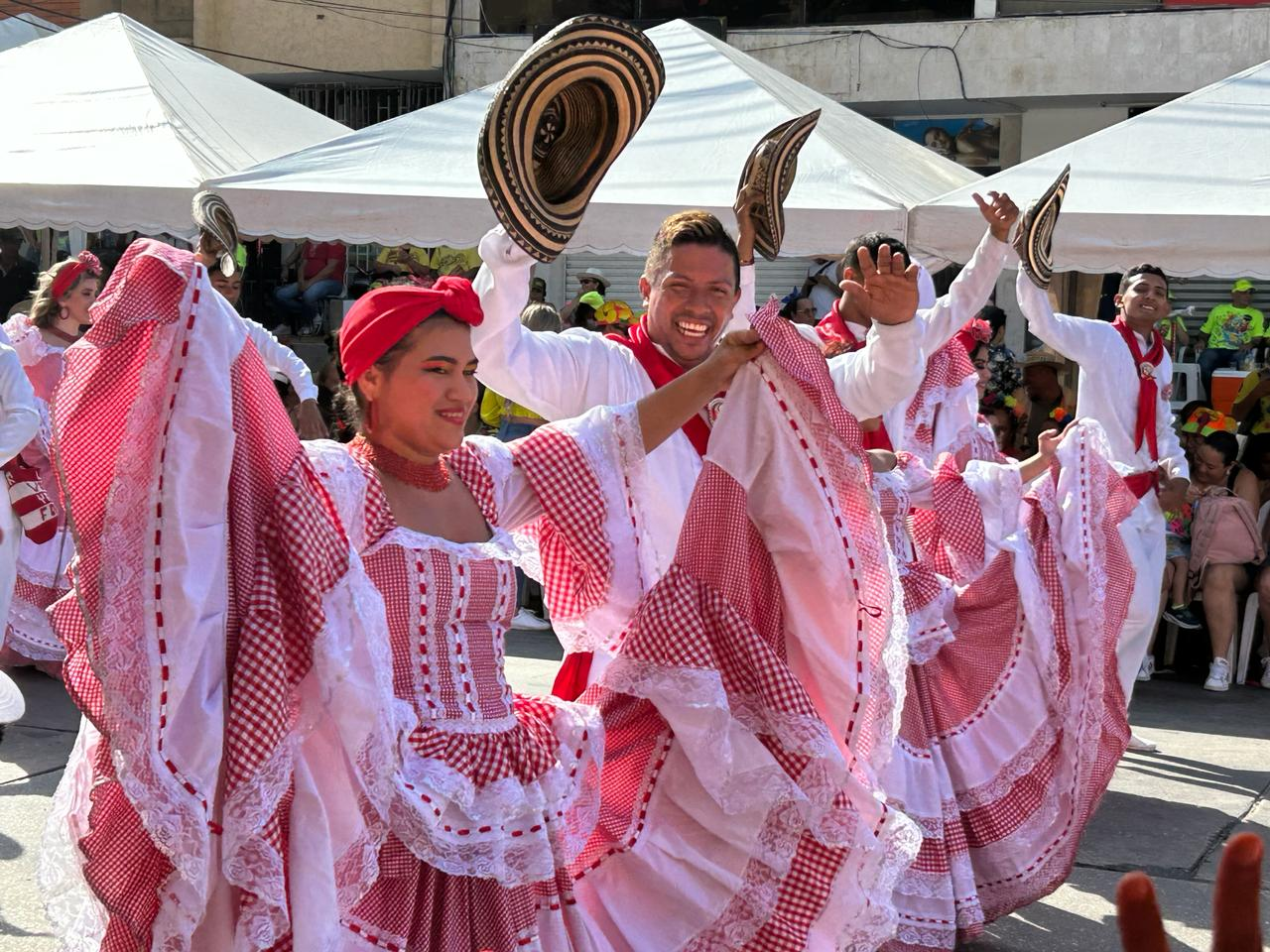
Cumbia dancers in Barranquilla's carnival.

The carnival in Colombia was introduced by the Spaniards. The Colombian carnival has incorporated elements from European culture, and has managed to syncretise, or reinterpret, traditions that belonged to the African and Amerindian cultures of Colombia. There is documentary evidence that the carnival existed in Colombia in the 17th century and had already caused concern to the colonial authorities, who censored the celebrations, especially in the main centers of power such as Cartagena, Bogotá and Popayán. The carnival, therefore, continued its evolution and reinterpretation in the small and at that time unimportant towns where celebrations did not offend the ruling elites. The result was the uninterrupted celebration of carnival festivals in Barranquilla (Barranquilla's Carnival), and other villages along the lower Magdalena River in northern Colombia, and in Pasto, Nariño (Blacks and Whites' Carnival) in the south of the country. In modern times, there have been attempts to introduce the carnival in the capital, Bogotá, in the early 20th century, but it has always failed to gain the approval of authorities. The Bogotá Carnival has had to wait until the 21st century to be resurrected, this time, by the authorities of the city. Colombia is recognized by its large variety of festivals, carnivals and fairs. Most towns have their own, ranging from those celebrating coffee (and almost every single agricultural produce) to the ones held in honor of the town's Saint feast. The common characteristics of the festivals are the nomination of a beauty Queen and the setting up of a public dance floor.

== Carnival in Southern Colombia ==
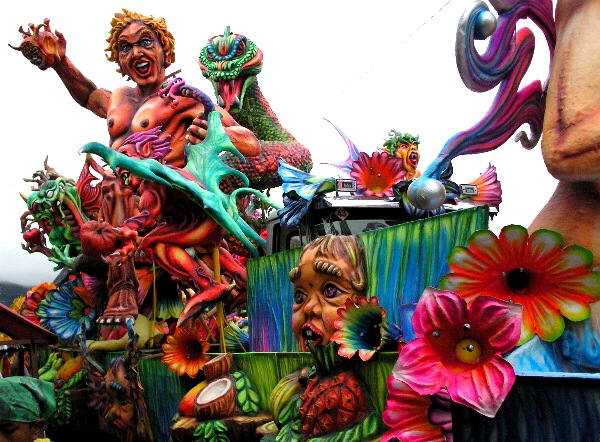
Carnival float in the Blacks and Whites' Carnival in Pasto, Colombia

A very important and traditional carnival is the Blacks and Whites' Carnival in the city of Pasto, Nariño. It is one of the most ancient carnivals in the Americas. It commemorates the day in which the African slaves had a free day when they unleashed all their happiness.

Some historians refer that in 1607, there was a slave rebellion in the town of Remedios, Antioquia that made the authorities panic. The event was remembered by the black population of Popayán, Cauca, who demanded a day off, in which they were really free. The King of Spain conceded January 5. It is said that when the news reached home the African population flocked to the streets and danced at the rhythm of African music and started to blacken with coal all the white walls of the city.

The enthusiastic celebration was brought to Pasto by the Ayerbe family around 1854. By 1887, the celebration had reached to certain social spheres and acquired a high level of refinement, and people started using costumes and masks. The Castaneda family recreated by the January 4 crewes could be a characterization of the Ayerbe Family.

== Carnival in Central Colombia ==
Bogotá was one of the first cities in the continent in celebrating its own carnival and that in 1539, just one year after the Hispanic foundation of the city the Spanish Crown decreed the celebrations will be carried out in Lent with the name of Carnestolendas of Santafé de Bogotá. In 1561 the Indian chief of Ubaque was allowed to participate celebrating the parties of his own culture (Muisca) which were part of the celebrations until the 19th century.

The carnival returned to the capital of Colombia in modern times. The celebration of the first Carnival in Bogotá dates back to 1916 and it started as a Student Carnival for which a congeniality queen was elected. The first queen of Bogotá's student carnival was Elvira Zea. After winning the contest she used her own real name as Queen's name, in that occasion she took the name Elvira I. The queen was the person in charge of opening the celebrations. In the following years the carnival grew in number of comparsas (krewes) and beauty queens. During the 1930s the national government and the council of Bogotá suspended the carnival due to disorders caused by alcohol consumption. An attempt to revive the carnival in 1960 failed again for reasons of alcohol abuse and violence.

The Carnival was resurrected by the Mayor of Bogotá in a Government Resolution on April 14, 2005. The objective of the new Carnival was to promote a collective atmosphere of fellowship and to celebrate life, creative expression, and enjoyment. It further aimed to generate a feeling of belonging to the city, to enforce processes of reconciliation and fair play, and the inclusion and recognition of all districts and cultures of the Capital City of Colombia.

== Main Colombian festivals, fairs and carnivals ==
- Barranquilla's Carnival (Carnaval de Barranquilla), with a century-long recorded history it holds the second largest carnival parades in the world after Rio de Janeiro's. The Carnival of Barranquilla was proclaimed by UNESCO, in November 2003, as one of the Masterpieces of the Oral Intangible Heritage of Humanity, during Olga Lucia Rodriquez carnival queen year.
- The Bogotá Carnival (Carnaval de Bogotá) starting around August 6, in order to commemorate the founding of the city, is a combination of various cultural events including masquerades, dances, and parades, among others. Parallel to this, the Bogotá Summer Festival is held, in which there are different social, cultural and sporting events, mainly in the area near the Simón Bolívar Park
- Rock al Parque in October, is the second largest rock festival in Latin America, after Rock in Rio. Around 1000 rock bands have participated in this event; both local and international bands. Apocalyptica, Slipknot, Plastilina Mosh and Manu Chao have performed in Rock al Parque, among other internationally famous bands. The event is held annually in Simón Bolívar Park in Bogotá.
- The Iberoamerican Theater Festival held in Bogotá every two years, is the biggest theater festival in the world.
- Pubenza Festivities: carnivals or festivals are celebrations Pubenza which are carried out in Popayán-Cauca. its programming varies each year. 2014 begins January 3 and ends four days after this celebration all participants can go free concerts in various parts of the city playing with paints, arina and carioca remains a tourist attraction since the cost of the trip is not high besides that gaston not become a fortune not to mention the fun you can get on arrival.
- Blacks and Whites' Carnival (Carnaval de Negros y Blancos) held from January 4 to January 6 in Pasto. Its origins date back to the Spanish rule times when slaves were allowed to celebrate on 5th and their masters showed their approval on 6th by painting their faces black. On these days they either put grease or talcum powder on their faces.
- Manizales Fair (Feria de Manizales) celebrated in the city of Manizales the first weeks of the year. Costume groups in fancy dress take over the city. A congeniality coffee queen is elected and bullfighting (faenas) takes place.
- Carnival of Riosucio (Carnaval de Riosucio) held every two years in January in Riosucio, Caldas. It is famous because it recalls past traditions with a mixture of art, music and customs by groups called Cuadrilas, drinking the traditional Guarapo (drink based on fermented maize) carried in Calabazos. During the carnival, the image of a cool and happy devil is exhibited.
- Festival Folclórico y Reinado Nacional del Bambuco in Neiva held on June 28 and June 29 for Saint Peter's and Saint Paul's days.
- Cali Fair (Feria de Cali), held in Cali from December 25 to New Year's Eve. It is famous for its Salsa marathon concerts attended by renowned Salsa bands. There are horse riding parades (Spanish: cabalgatas), masquerades and dances groups.
- The Flowers Fair (Feria de las Flores), is held during August in the city of Medellín with its flowers parade and the main attraction called the Desfile de Silleteros.
- Vallenato Legend Festival (Festival de la Leyenda Vallenata). Held in Valledupar, Cesar, in April or May. The festival is a celebration of vallenato music and also a competition to find the best accordionist of the year and to select the Vallenato King (Rey Vallenato) among hundreds of participants from all over the country.
- Carnival of San Pacho (Fiestas de San Pacho). Held in the city of Quibdó, Chocó Department, 20 September – 4 October, a celebration to honor Saint Francis of Assisi.

== Regional and folkloric festivities ==
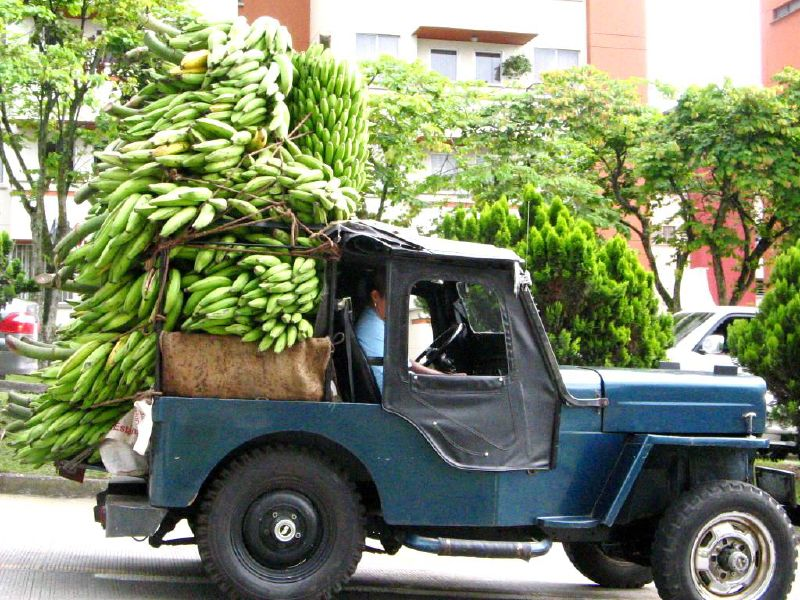
El Yipao (the jeep parade)

- Folkloric Festival, Bambuco National Contest and International Folklore Show (Festival Folclórico, Reinado Nacional del Bambuco y Muestra Internacional del Folclor) in Neiva. Mostly known as Saint Peter festivities (Fiestas del San Pedro) held between the last two weeks of June and early July.
- Pubenza Festivities (Fiestas de Pubenza), in Popayán, known for its competition of Chirimias (folkloric musical groups).
- Colombian Folklore Festival (Festival Folklórico Colombiano) in Ibagué.
- Medellín's Tango Street (Tangovía) on Carlos Gardel Avenue in the suburb of Manrique.
- Joropo National Festival (Festival Nacional del Joropo) in Villavicencio in December.
- Candles and Lanterns Festival (Fiesta de Velas y Faroles) is held in Quimbaya, Quindío on December 7 and 8. Each of the barrios in the township compete to produce the most spectacular lighting arrangements.
- The Yipao or Jeep Parade in Armenia, Colombia
- Green Moon Festival Festival de la Luna Verde celebrated in San Andres y Providencia Islands, this is a unique festival with characteristics that make it different from any other festival in Colombia. Here the Afro-Caribbean influence is very strong, and predominance of the English language lyrics of calypso and reggae.

== See also ==
- Barranquilla's Carnival
- Bogotá's Carnival
- Blacks and Whites' Carnival
- Carnival of Riosucio
- Festivals in Colombia
- Carnival of Sanpacho
