= Info (band) =

Colombian industrial metal band

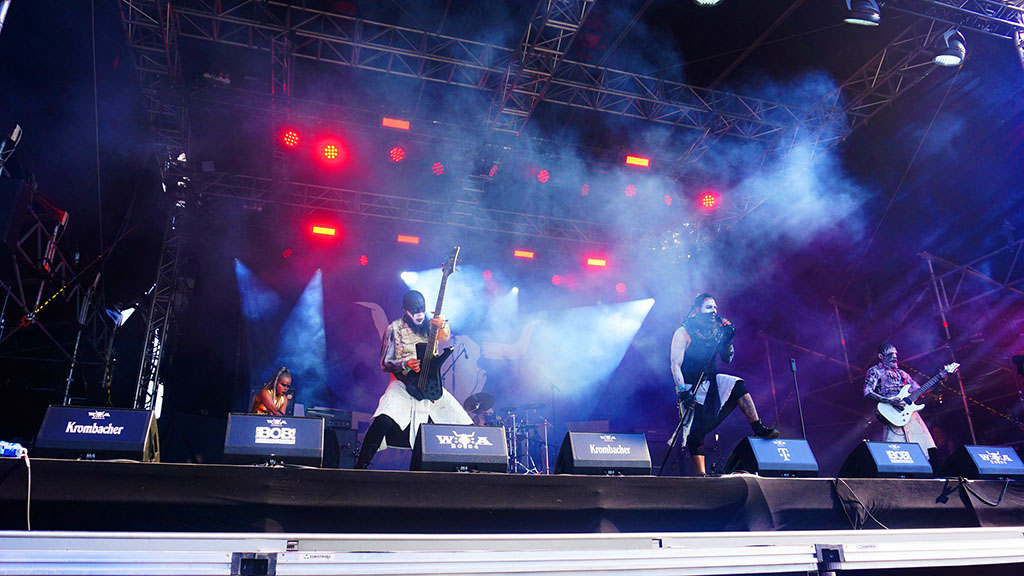
- INFO performing at Wacken Open Air 2024 (Wacken, Germany)

Background information
- Origin: Bogotá D.C. Colombia
- Genres: Industrial metal Future metal
- Years active: 2008–present
- Labels: Megavelvet Ultra Music; Discos Intolerancia; La Fraternidad; Viuda Negra Music
- Members: Carbu; John C. Milton R. AvvA; Camilo J.
- Past members: Damian C. Alex L. Andres C. Daniel T.

INFO is a future metal, industrial metal band from Bogotá D.C., Colombia. The band won fifth place in the Wacken Open Air Metal Battle 2024.

== History ==
=== Origins (2000–2004) ===
In late 2000, Alex L. (drums) and John C. (guitar) got together to start a post-punk project that did not have a bassist. In the search of a bass player they met Milton R., who was drummer for the alternative rock band Santaraña and groove metal band BrujoNitro. Milton R. quit percussion to join the band as bassist. Alex L. was a substitute drummer in the rock band 1280 Almas, a band whose boom in the 1990s made them famous in the Colombian rock scene. Once this line-up was defined, the band took a new sound path, leaving post-punk and post-grunge behind to search for its own, more contemporary sound, moving away from the nü-metal sound that was so fashionable in Colombia on those years. Working experimentally in underground, INFO matures its proposal to officially present it in 2008.

The name INFO refers to the word information, which represents everything that the new man needs: there are no longer limits to having information... "the Internet, the media and the networks are at the reach of every human being to be exploited in pursuit of evolution" (John C. in an interview for Radioactiva 97.9 FM, Colombia - March 2005).

The name of the band arose in a spontaneous conversation about the change of the project's name and was proposed by Milton R. in order to call the band the same in Spanish or English, taking as a point of inspiration the intro sample of the song "Hero" from the album Psalm 69: The Way to Succeed and the Way to Suck Eggs by the band Ministry.

=== First steps on industrial rock (2004–2008) ===
Looking for an advanced sound that would distinguish them in the new Colombian trends, Milton R. introduced the first programming sequences made with a desktop computer creating the bass line of the song "La Marcha" using software from Image Line and Native Instruments. This new proposal of electronic rock combined with usual rock live instruments started the beginning of the band's full exploration of the sounds of industrial rock.

Working on what would be this new industrial-electro sound for the band, they worked in the recording studio until they released a 4-song EP that was released in 2006, which included a version of "Muevete", an original Colombian rock classic from the band Estados Alterados. The song had the approval of Gabriel Lopera, composer of the song and the band Estados Alterados and was broadcast on alternative music channels at Bogota.

By this days the band's musical influences were German industrial music, EBM and the sounds of bands like Nine Inch Nails, Rammstein, Die Krupps and Pain.

Then they recorded their first video clip with the support of Billig Cinema, an independent company that produces audio and video productions. Video was directed by Larry Paipa for the song "La Marcha". The video streamed through channels such as CityTv in Bogotá and Musinet in Medellin. As the second video, the single "Muevete" was chosen, recorded in June 2005, once again directed by Larry Paipa with a more ambitious production than the first video. By this time the band had the participation of Damian C. on keyboards, who left the band in 2006 to undertake personal projects.

=== Consolidation (2008–2011) ===
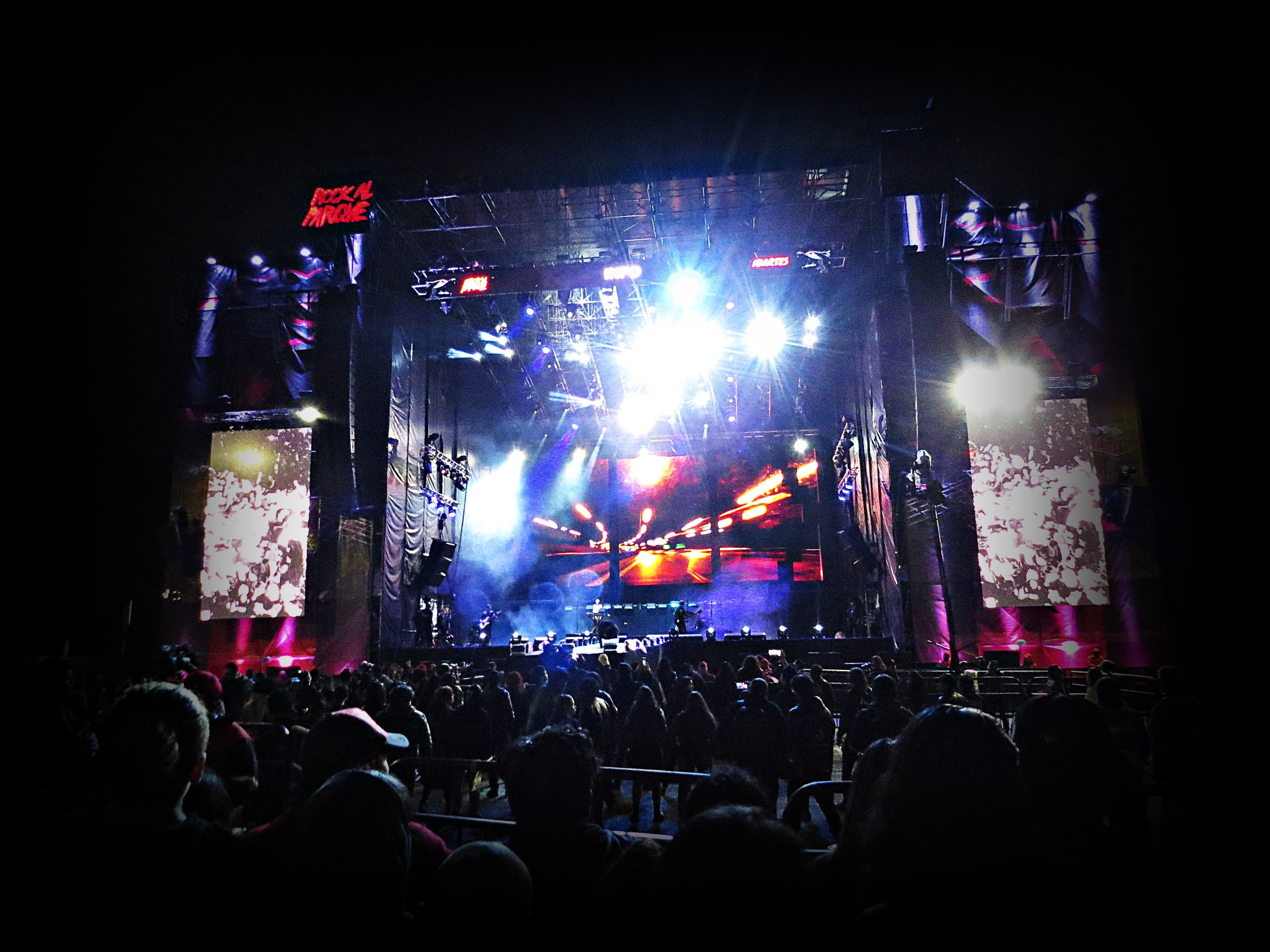
INFO on Rock al Parque 2023 Festival (Bogota, Colombia)

In the background, on 2006 the band was also summoned among the 32 preselected acts for the edition XII of Rock al Parque Festival. They performed at the Electronic Tortazo 2006 at the Media Torta Open Air Theater in December 2006 alongside the best exponents of electro rock from Bogota. By June 2008, once their industrial metal sound had been consolidated, the band performed as guests at Colombia's first gothic and industrial music festival, Bogota In Darkness. They participated in the Rock in Construction 2 festival in Surfonica, winning among more than 30 bands from various rock genres. They were representatives for Bogotá at the Cali Underground festival in 2008 and 2009 versions.

The activity of the band can be summarized as follows:

- Cali Underground Fest 2008.
- Nominated for Best Electro Rock Artist Shock Awards 2008.
- Cali Underground 2009.
- Trivium Fest 2009.
- "Una Canción para Tocar la Vida" Fest 2009.
- Calibre Fest 2009, Cali, CO.
- Manizales Grita Rock Fest 2010.
- "Chapinero Localidad Gótica" documentary – live recording at the Vinacure Museum (Bogotá, CO)
- XVII Rock al Parque Festival 2011
- VIVA! Festival 2011 (Pereira, CO)
- Facatativa Rocktown 2011 Fest.
- Rock al Aire Libre Fest 2011, Calarca, CO.
- Nominated for Best Live Band Subterránica Awards 2012.
- Opening act of Pain at Colombia – Winners by contest.
- Anti Roscas Fest 2012 (Bogotá, CO)
- Calarca Metal Fest 2012 – (Calarca, CO)
- 2.º. Rock & Metal Pacho Festival 2012.
- VIVA! Festival 2012.
- "La Escena Rock" magazine. For this issue the band was on cover photo and central article.
- Rock Streaming 2012 Orbita Rock.
- Gothic Fest II: opening act for Theatres des Vampires (Bogotá, CO) 2013.
- Manizales Grita Rock Fest 2013.
- Car Audio Rock Festival 2014.
- Rock al Parque Festival 20 Years (Bogota, CO)
- Jingle Bell Rock Radioactiva 2014 (Bogota, CO)
- Tattoo Music Fest I (Bogota, CO)
- XIV Metal de las Montañas Fest, (Bogota, CO)
- Winners Best Art of an Album (NITRO INVERNO) Subterranica Awards
- Opening act of Combichrist and Hocico in Colombia.
- Rock X Festival 2016 (Bogotá, CO)
- Calarca Metal Fest 10 Años (Calarca, CO)
- Cali Gothic Fest 2018 (Cali, CO)
- Rock X Fest 2018 (Bogotá, CO)
- Opening act of Eluveitie in Colombia
- Winners ALBUM OF THE YEAR Subterranica Awards (NEURODRÓN)
- XVII Metal de las Montañas Fest (Bogota, CO)
- ROCK AL PARQUE 25 YEARS FEST (Bogota, CO)
- Shama Fest 2019 (Entrerrios, CO) - winners by contest
- Rock al Río 2019 (Rionegro, CO) - Invitados
- Festival Rock Hyntiba 2020 (Bogotá, CO) - winners by contest
- Ace of Spades Live Sessions (Bogotá, CO)
- FIURA Unirock Alternativo 2021 (Online)
- Opening act for Prong in Colombia
- Festival BOSA LA ESCENA DEL ROCK v. 26 (Bogota, CO) (Guest)
- VII Tunjuelito Territorio Rock Festival (Bogota, CO) (1st-place winners by contest)
- Festival Rock X Engativa (Bogota, CO) (1st-place winners by contest)
- XV Usmetal Festival (Bogotá, CO) (1st-place winners by contest)
- Ibague Ciudad Rock XXII (Guest)
- Festival ROCK AL PARQUE 2023: 1st-place winners by contest scoring 100/100.
- Galeras Rock Festival 2024 (Pasto, Nariño, Colombia)
- Wacken Metal Battle South America Northern Region 2023 (1st-place winners by contest)
- Wacken Open Air Metal Battle 2024 (5th-place winners by world contest)

=== Inferno 2Ø51 (2022) ===
The third album released by the band is Inferno 2Ø51 9" vinyl, which is a collection of the band's members favorite songs released on the previous albums, including the song "31" as the only new song included on the record. These songs were re-recorded with Carbu on vocals as well as all the instruments, distributed by the record label Viuda Negra Music (Colombia) released in March 2022.

"Inferno 2Ø51" was released on CD in August 2024.

=== Wacken Open Air (2024) ===
INFO is the first Colombian band who performed at Wacken Open Air festival, competing on the Wacken Metal Battle (known as W:O:A Metal Battle) along 30 bands from different countries and regions. INFO played at W:O:A Metal Battle as winners from the Northern South American Region 2023, winning the finals at Bogota (Colombia) in December 2023 at the La Media Torta Open Air Theatre in which bands from Colombia, Ecuador and Venezuela performed too.

INFO performed at the Wacken Open Air's Headbangers Stage on wedenesday July 31, 2024 in front of a metalhead crowd from a lot of countries. On Friday August 2, after the deliberation of 40 judges, the band was proclaimed the 5th-place winner in the competition. Among 30 bands in the competition and 9,000 applications from bands from all over the planet, bringing a very worthy representation of Latin American metal to the podium of the largest metal stage in the world.

== Band members ==
- Carbu - vocals
- Milton R. - bass guitar
- Adriana V. - keyboards
- Camilo J. - drums
- John C. - guitar

== Past members ==
- Daniel T. - lead vocals (2018–2020)
- Andres C. - lead vocals (2012–2018)
- Damian C. - keyboards (2004–2006)
- Alex L. - drums (2000–2010)

== Discography ==
=== Albums ===
- Inferno 2Ø51 - 2022
- Neurodrón - 2018
- Nitro Inverno - 2015

=== EPs ===
- Info - (2005)

=== Singles ===
- Info Digital - (2006)

=== DVD ===
- La Marcha (de los monos mutantes) - (2005)
