= Festival y Reinado Nacional del Carbón =

The Coal National festival and Pageant (Spanish: Festival y Reinado Nacional del Carbón) is a festival in Colombia that takes place in the town of Barrancas, Department of La Guajira from October 10 to the 13. The festival is an artistic and cultural event which celebrates de municipalities' Roman Catholic devotion to the "Virgin of Pilar", there are art expositions showing different coal sculptures and paintings as well as local gastronomy events. There also cultural expositions showing the arts and crafts of the Wayuu indigenous ethnic group.

== See also ==
- Festivals in Colombia
- List of festivals in La Guajira
