= Carnival of Bogotá =

Annual event in Bogotá, Colombia

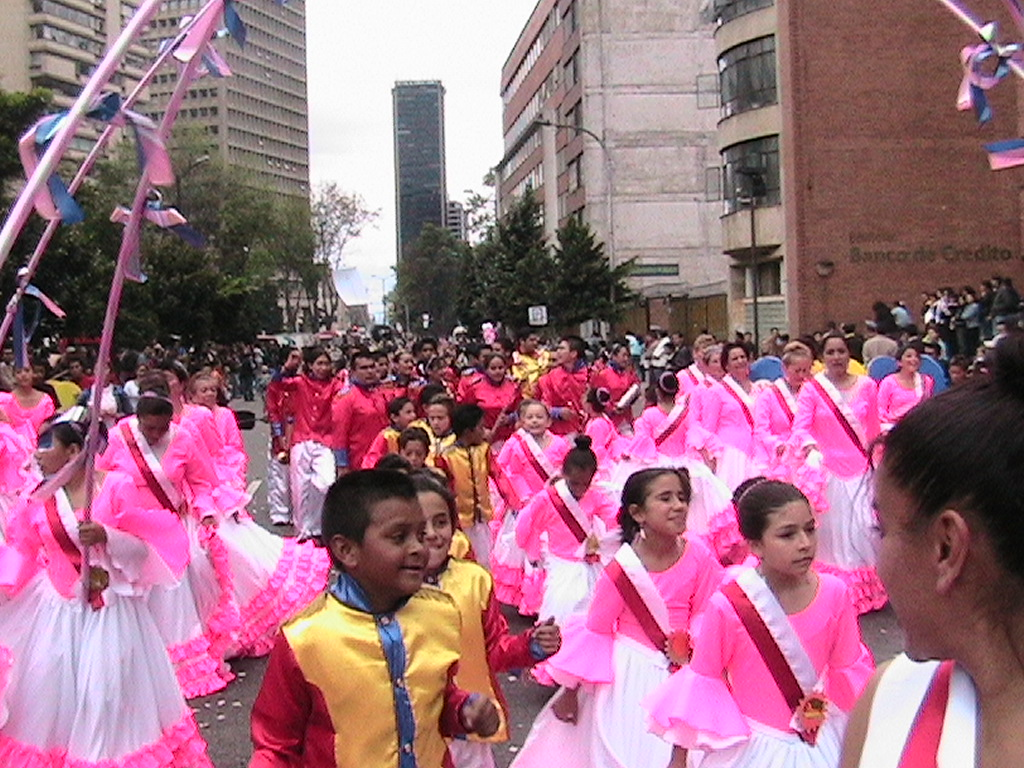
Carnival of Bogotá 2006

Bogotá's Carnival or Carnival of Bogotá (Spanish: Carnaval de Bogotá) is celebrated in Bogotá every year on August 5 and August 6 for the city's anniversary of its Hispanic foundation. Most of the cultural events take place in the heart of Parque Metropolitano Simón Bolívar The festivities also include pre-carnival celebrations during the month of July. One of the main objectives of the carnival is to promote and encourage the cultural and musical diversity of Colombia.

== Activities ==
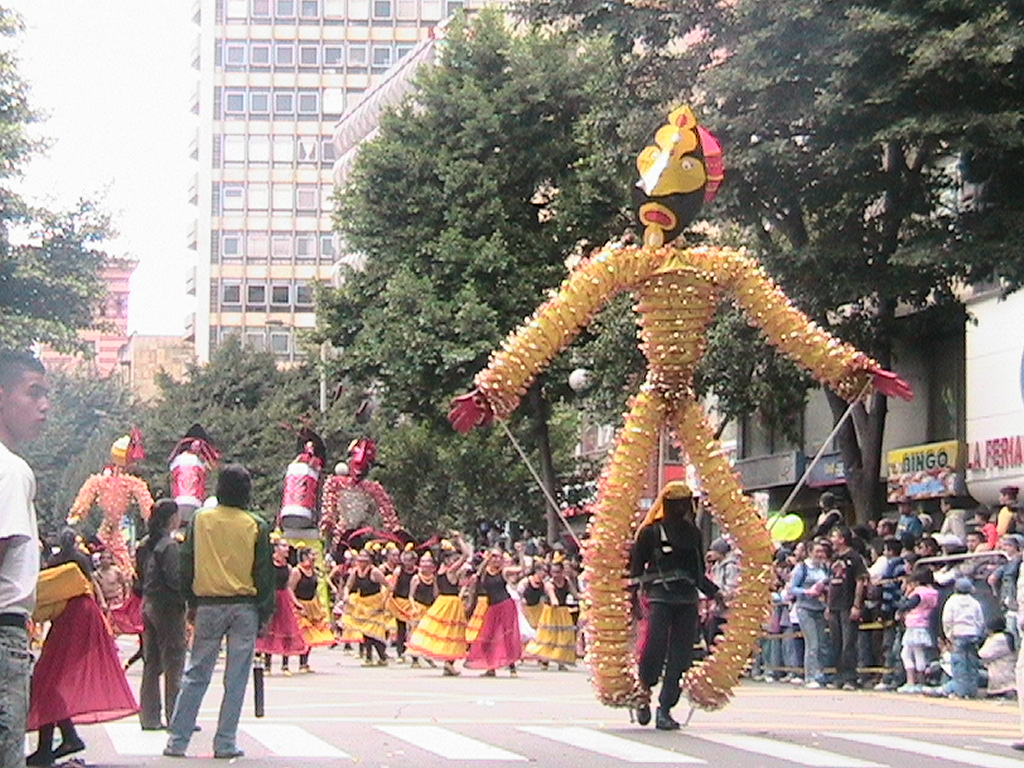
A krewe in the reconciliation carnival of 2007

Many activities take place during the celebrations of the carnival

- Comparsas (krewes): parades of folkloric groups, dances and music that represent the cultural manifestations from different regions and cultures of the country.
- Verbenas: celebrations on the suburbs' streets with dances, music, games and gastronomy from different regions of the country.
- Pre-carnival: days of motivation and preparation for the carnival including cultural events like street theater fairs, puppets, story telling, etc.
- Children's Carnival, every year since 2005 the carnival includes a parade where the best comparsas of the Children's Carnival parade on the main streets of the city.

== History ==
According to historian Marcos Gonzales, Bogotá was one of the first cities in the continent in celebrating its own carnival and that in 1539, just one year after the Hispanic foundation of the city the Spanish Crown decreed the celebrations will be carried out in Lent with the name of Carnestolendas of Santafé de Bogotá. In 1561 the Indian chief of Ubaque was allowed to participate celebrating the parties of his own culture (Muisca) which were part of the celebrations until the 19th century.

The celebration of the modern carnival in Bogotá dates back to 1916, when the first queen of Bogotá's student carnival, Elvira Zea, was crowned in a congeniality contest. After winning the contest she used her real name as Queen's name, in that occasion she took the name Elvira I. The queen was the person in charge of opening the celebrations. In the following years the carnival grew in number of comparsas and beauty queens. In the 1930s the national government and the mayorship of Bogotá suspended the carnival due to disorders caused by alcohol. An attempt to revive the carnival in 1960 failed for reasons of alcohol abuse and violence.

The Carnival was resurrected by Bogotá's Mayor in a Government Resolution on April 14, 2005. The objective of the new Carnival was to promote a collective atmosphere of fellowship and to celebrate life, creative expression, and enjoyment. It further seeks to generate a feeling of belonging to the city, to enforce processes of reconciliation and fair play, and the inclusion and recognition of all districts and cultures of the Capital City of Colombia.

== Bogotá's Carnival Timeline ==
- 1539 – The Spanish crown by decree ordered to have the celebrations with the name Carnestolendas of Santafé de Bogotá
- 1561 – The cacique of Ubaque brings to the carnival the celebrations of the Muisca culture.
- 1916 - As student carnival the first carnival of the century takes place, Elvira I is elected the first Carnival's queen.
- 1930 - Suspended due to problems of alcohol abuse and violence
- 1960 - An attempt to revive the carnival fails due to alcohol abuse and violence
- 2005 - The carnival is resurrected by the city's Mayor Luis Eduardo Garzón as the Carnival of Diversity. It takes place on August 6. A Children's Carnival is celebrated in October. The 2005 edition of the carnival, in occasion of the 467th anniversary of Hispanic foundation of the city, was called the celebration of the diversity and had a motto: "celebrate life and express yourself as you wish". A metropolitan parade on the main streets of the city took place on August 6, with the participation of thirty comparsas, each of them consisting of at least fifty members.
- 2006 - The carnival was called the Carnival of Creative Sharing
- 2007 - The carnival was named the Carnival of Reconciliation

== See also ==
- Carnival in Colombia
- Festivals in Colombia
