= Blacks and Whites' Carnival =

Carnival celebration in southern Colombia

Blacks and Whites' Carnival Carnaval de Negros y Blancos
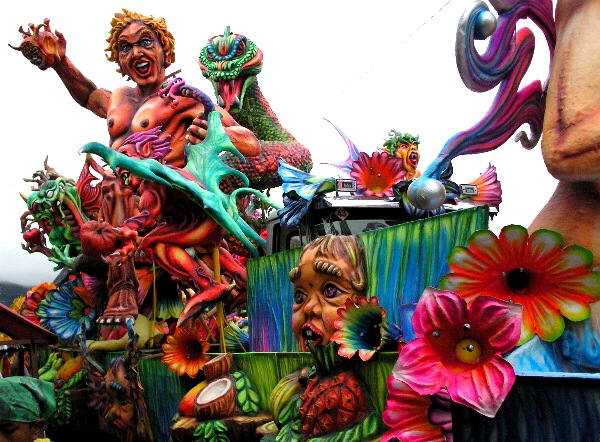
- Nickname: Carnavales de Pasto
- Genre: Carnival
- Date: 2–7 January
- Frequency: Annual
- Locations: Pasto, Colombia
- Inaugurated: 1546

Carnaval de Negros y Blancos
- UNESCO Intangible Cultural Heritage
- Country: Colombia
- Reference: 00287
- Region: Latin America and the Caribbean

Inscription history
- Inscription: 2009 (4th session)
- List: Representative

Blacks and Whites' Carnival (Spanish: Carnaval de Negros y Blancos) is a Carnival, including a parade, in southern Colombia established in 1546. Although originating in the city of Pasto, it has been adopted by other municipalities in Nariño and southwestern Colombia. It is celebrated every year from 2 to 7 January and attracts many Colombian and foreign tourists.

On 30 September 2009, UNESCO named this Carnival among the Masterpieces of the Oral and Intangible Heritage of Humanity.

== History ==
=== Origins ===
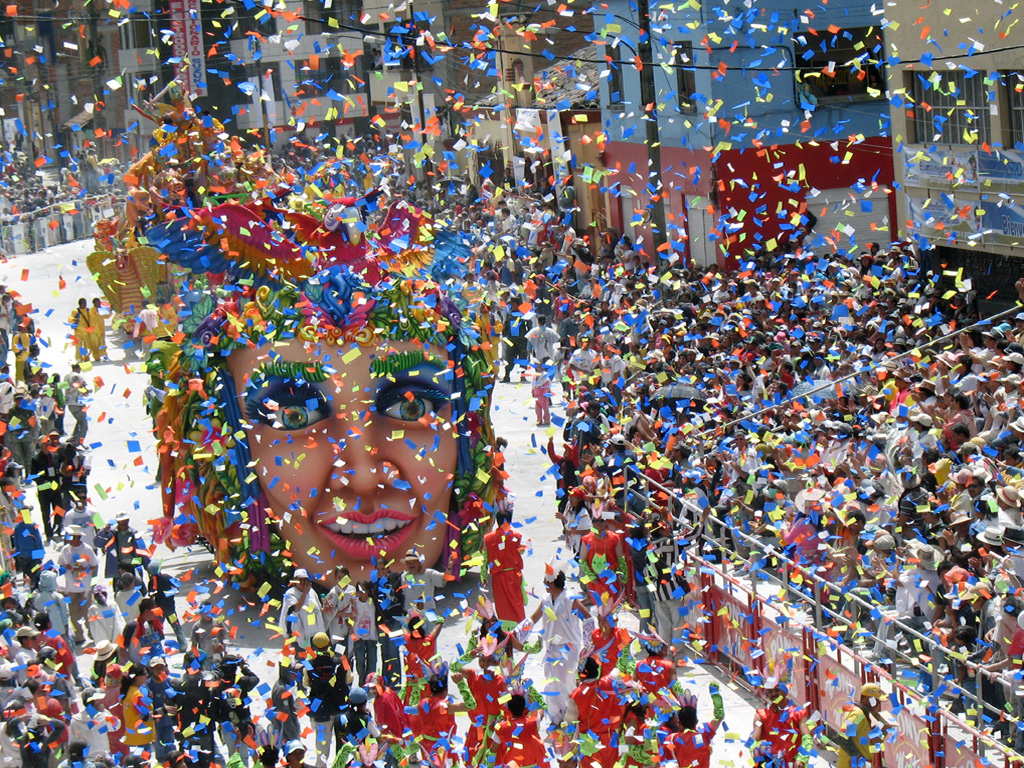
Great Parade, 6 January 2007

The Blacks and Whites Carnival originated from a fusion of multiple cultures and expressions: the Andes, the Amazon, and the Pacific culture. It was first celebrated in the 16th century, in 1546. The date of the carnival sets it apart from other similar festivals, as it has a distinctly indigenous origin. The Blacks and Whites Carnival coincides with the celebration of the Moon (Quilla), which is reminiscent of the rituals performed by the Pastos and the Quillacingas; agrarian cultures who honored the moon with dances as well as praying to the sun to protect their crops at harvest time.

These celebrations, with the fusion and influence from Spanish culture, gave rise to Hispanic religious syncretism, whose expressions eventually would become the Pasto carnival. In the 19th century, the authorities prohibited such festivities to avoid indigenous uprisings. However, the festivities reappeared in 1834; from indigenous people with their children, to mestizos with masquerades, and local people's celebrations. These were all duly framed in the religious calendar, particularly the festivities of the Virgen de las Mercedes, (Virgin of Mercy, 24 September) and the Immaculate Conception of Mary (8 December).

In those times, on the eve of Three Kings' Day, the game of negritos (little blacks) was also held festively and spontaneously, mainly between whites and mestizos, due to the low presence of the black population in Pasto. This festival contrasted by the extroversion of a community characterized by a peaceful and taciturn life, which found in those days an opportunity to break the established.

Its origin was a "holiday" for blacks, originating in Gran Cauca, the region to which Pasto belonged. In 1607 there was a slave rebellion in Remedios, Antioquia that caused panic among the colonial authorities. This event was remembered by the large black population of Popayán who demanded a day of rest in which they could be truly free. To preserve social peace, the Spanish Crown granted 5 January for this purpose.

“THE PRINCE, EMPTY DAY FOR THE BLACK SLAVES.” Now understanding this relationship and request of many black slaves of said province, I come to tell you out loud that this request is paternally accepted and an empty day will be given entirely to the blacks and it will be on January 5, the eve of the feast of the Holy Majesties and venerating esteem the Holy Majesty of the Black King. Dated in Madrid. “I the Prince.”3

This news was proclaimed in Popayán and thus 5 January was declared a day off for people of color.The black population of the capital of Cauca took to the streets to dance to the rhythm of African music and began to paint the famous white walls of that town black. Later this custom spread to the south, gaining an unusual strength in the cold city of Pasto, where the historian José María Cordobés Moure says, there are already vestiges that it was played around 1854. This is how the genesis of the game of Negros is configured. and Blancos de Pasto, and in this way his first decades would pass.

The Blancos game, an important part of the carnival, was born at the dawn of Three Kings' Day (6 January) in 1912, founded on the need to express imagination, play, friendship and share the joy that on those dates revives life. In a fine and exclusive brothel in the city, The House of the Robby Ladies, located on Calle Real (current Carrera 25), the daring of the group of tailors from the famous tailoring shop owned by Don Ángel Zarama, among whom Ángel María López and Máximo Erazo were there, he takes them to take the French compact of one of the most sought-after ladies and proceeds to spread the powder with women's perfume among all those present with the cry of ¡Vivan los Blanquitos!, as a response to the already traditional game of Negros. It didn't take long for the master cutter's companions to become victims first and then participants in the game. Then, everyone would have to go out into the street to repeat the joke with the unsuspecting parishioners who were leaving the Three Kings' Mass in the church of San Juan Bautista, repeating Long live the Blacks and long live the Whites! The custody of the Galeras will be inserted forever and vigorously into the essence of the Pastusos.

=== Establishment ===
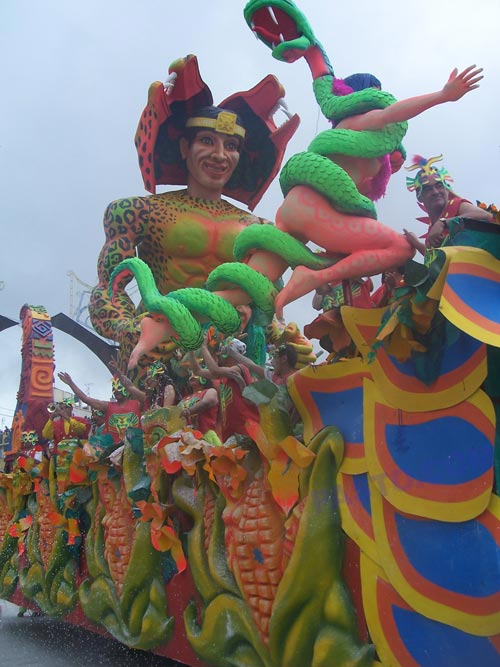
Side view of Pachá Carnaval in the Great Parade, 6 January 2006.

It wasn't until the mid-1920s that the actual celebration acquired its corpus, which merge other instances, dates and places, giving it a more urban and inclusive style. On 6 January 1926, senior students from the high schools and the University of Nariño decided to participate actively in the party, choosing as his queen to Romelia Martinez, and go out through the streets dressed in carnival costumes and dancing to the regional music. That was the first real Parade, not for the traditional Epiphany,` but Whites' Day.

By 4 January 1929, a cavalcade of over a hundred riders preparing to cheer up the Blacks (5) and Whites' (6) game, for it had been concentrated near the Boyaca Battalion. At three p.m. when the riders were ready for the parade, a whole family arrived, there was the father, the mother, two girls, two boys, and three young men who rode tired nags and who were followed by laborers who herded the mules charged with trunks, and trying the pigs and sheep did not disband. That people were loaded with lugging cages with parrots and monkeys, not to mention the "mica"(pot). The father was an Antioqueño settler traveling with all his family, who after spending many years in the east (Putumayo Department), had decided to leave the jungle to return to "civilized" earth.

Alfredo Torres and Carlos Martínez Arellano Madroñero, parade organizers, ordered, two of the ride to open countryside and no shorts or lazy included the tired travelers among the cavalcade. Those who came from the east were joyful by this unexpected encounter and ignoring why so animated "bumper" were placed at the center of the parade, and surrounded by the riders in the process of promoting the carnival. The head of the family greeted the crowds who witnessed the passage of the ride.

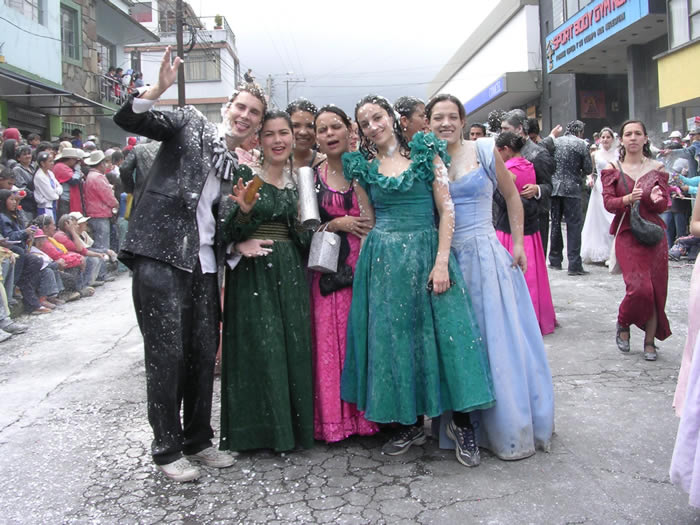
Arrival of the Castañeda Family, 4 January 2007.

Then, the historic shout echoed through the city: "Viva la Famila Castañeda" (Hurray to Castañeda Family) That was the invention of Torres Arellano, worthy of his talent, and passed into posterity as a new and original sign of joy. The settler and his people paraded happy and excited, through the streets of the city. The unexpected passengers received the cheers of thousands of Pastusos along roads, squares and avenues of the capital of Nariño. At the end of the parade, members of the Castañeda Family asked their new friends to accompany them to the Hotel Paris where they would stay. The hotel was located in the Calle Real (Royal Street), where now stands the "Zuchín" building at 25th Carrera between 17th and 18th Streets.

Other versions said the Castañeda family characterized in the comparsas on 4 January is also a cartoon of Bucheli Ayerbe family, one of whose members Don Julian Bucheli Ayerbe, became the first governor of Nariño, at the break of the 20th century.

Until the advent of Carnavalito (Children's Carnival), the parade of the Castañeda family would become the opening of the Carnival. The decades of the 1930s and 1940s watched a structured Carnival, and before the advent of the first heavy industries, acquired presence and prominence in folk art, particularly the creative expression of the artisans represented in monumental paper sculptures, just like mobile motorized scenarios built on trucks, the famous floats.

=== Maturity ===
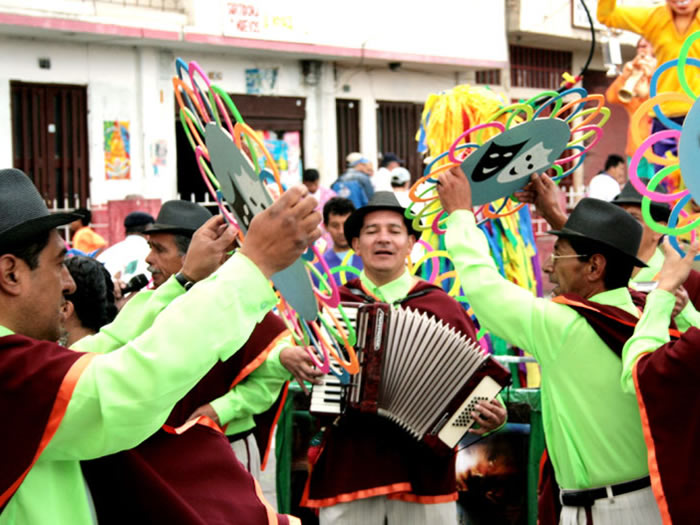
In the 1950s, the Mayor's office began to reward the best comparsas and murgas

In the 1950s, the figures of the main floats acquired movement, and thanks to the work of the master artisan Alfonso Zambrano began a new era of splendor. During this time, the Mayor of Pasto (sometimes with the participation of the Government of Nariño) began to take control of the organization of the festivities, especially the appropriation of resources to fund the awards for best floats, which were extended soon to the comparsas and murgas.

In the late 1960s, the search and recruitment of national and international commercial orchestras was started, the most famous were Venezuelan Los Melódicos, Billo's Caracas Boys and Ecuadorian Medardo and his Players. In those years, Luis Quenguan was the first cameraman, who made a record in film (black and white) of 8 mm, Super 8 and 16 mm of the Carnivals. In 1966, thanks to Don Mario Fernando Rodriguez, arises in the Bolivar neighborhood, the Carnavalito, or Children's Carnival, this autonomous party will take at least a decade in joining the official program.

=== Renovation ===
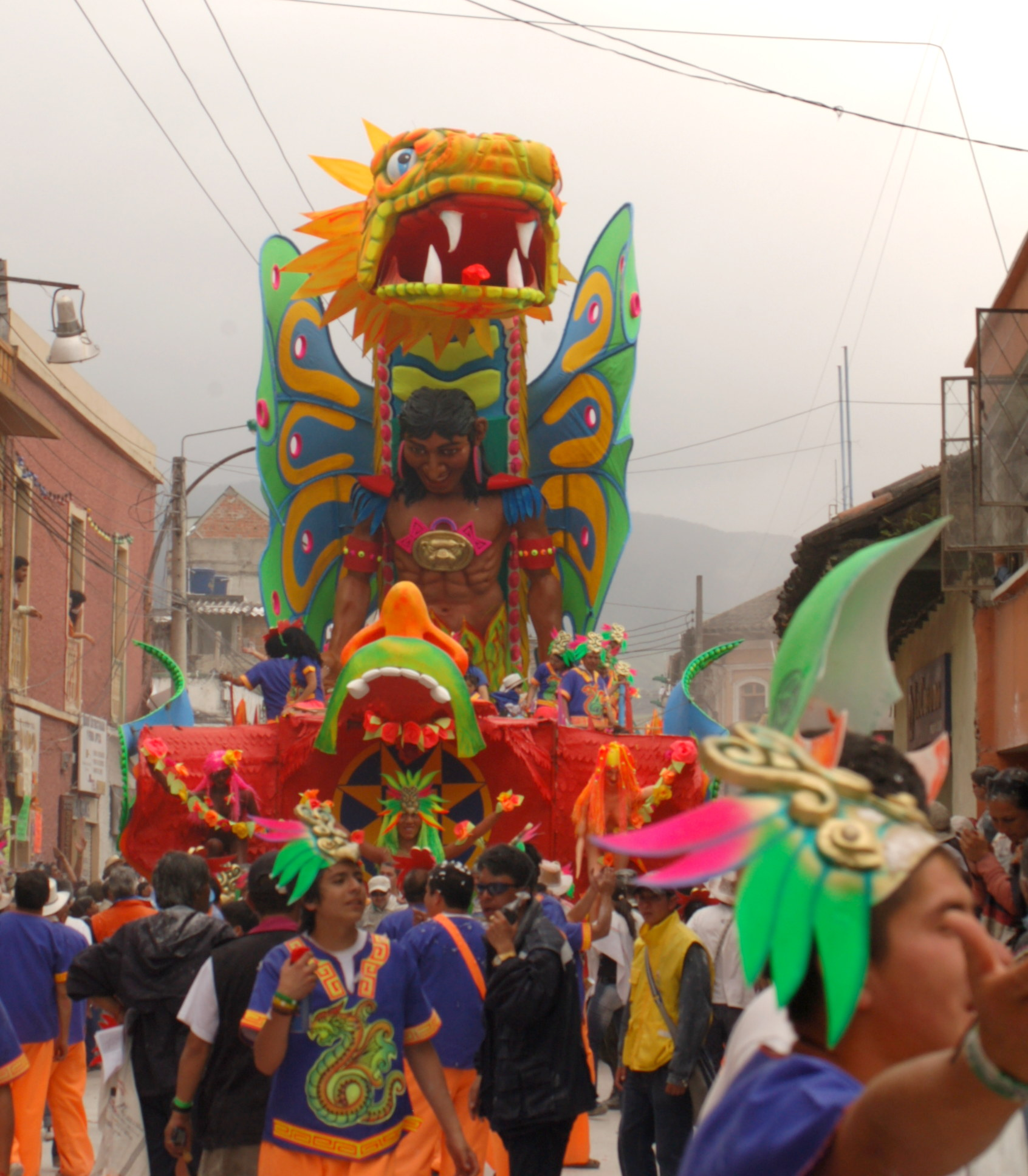
Tinkunni winner float of 2008 Great Parade

With the arrival of the Pan-American Highway in the 1970s and the greater inclusion of Pasto in the Colombian economy, the Carnival was renewed with the presence of new trends in materials handling, new rhythms and a growing stream cultural advocated by the rediscovery of the Quillacingas roots following with the activism in the Great Parade or Whites' Day. Was at that time that the floats were filled with figures and references to various social demands of the Pastusos. Anyway, in those years, the first color footage of the parade on 6 January was taken, again in charge of Master Luis Quenguan.

For the 1980s, the multiplicity of cultural trends around the Carnival and the yuppie style highlights the need for creating a strong Corporation to assume the planning, organizing and executing of this event. It was planned that the institution had involvement of both the City of Pasto, as industrial and commercial sector, artisans and of course, the academics from the region.

In this decade, the populations near Pasto began to assemble their own carnivals, some ephemeral as Greens' Carnival in the city of Ipiales (now Carnival of the Frontier) and other more durable as the Reds's Carnival in the city of Buesaco. The predominant note is that throughout the southwestern region of Colombia, became widespread festivities that coincided with the end-of-year celebrations that took borrowed elements of the now popular Blacks and Whites' Carnival.

This reality has two attempts to establish of an institution to ensure the preservation of the feasts of Pasto, but efforts of the mid-1980s, and the start of the 1990s, were not fruitful because the various sectors involved didn't agree, it will be the Mayor of Pasto, which still managed the festival through a special Undersecretary's Office called the Carnival Office, this office began to concern about the loss of identity of Blacks and Whites' Carnival, mainly with the massive introduction of the Ecuadorian canned foam. Was at this time of upheaval, which massifies the use of the now traditional expression: "¡Viva Pasto, Carajo!" (Hurray Pasto, Carajo!)

=== 21st century ===
Finally, in November 2001, by Law No 706, the Blacks and Whites' Carnival was declared "Cultural Heritage of the Nation" by the Colombian Congress and with such declaration, took priority the construction of the Plaza of Carnival and Culture, signaling the Senda del Carnaval (Carnival Path) and the creation of the Corpocarnaval (Carnival Corporation) as an entity of private law, associative, with mixed participation, for non-profit and common good, providing adequate and proper conduct of Carnival, which rescues as: "a transverse cultural playful expression in the urban context". Therefore, one of its first tasks was the creation of the Museo del Carnaval (Carnival Museum).

With these achievements, new era began for this event, characterized by the planning, organization, dissemination, research and modernization, taking priority for the promotion of culture and addressing controversial issues like whether or not to negotiate the broadcast rights for radio, television and internet. Now, the Blacks and Whites Carnival has been officially included in government plans of the municipality of Pasto, but managed by an autonomous office, which had as its main project, its recognition and accreditation with the international community and agencies such as the Unesco, definitively introducing these celebrations in the globalized world, such as Intangible Heritage of Humanity. This goal was finally achieved on 30 September 2009.

== Carnival Stages ==
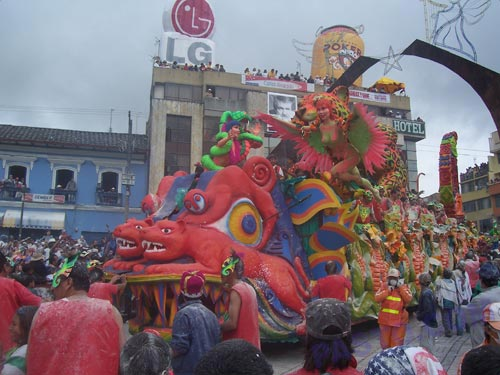
Pachá Carnaval, winning float of the Great Parade of 2006, entering the Carnival Plaza

The carnival includes four major stages: the Carnavalito (Children's Carnival), the Arrival of the Castaneda Family, Blacks' Day and Whites' Day, the last one being considered most important because of its grand parade. However, there are also pre-carnival activities and in recent years, 7 January is considered the final day of the carnival, with the celebration of the "Day of the Guinea Pig" when locals and tourists enjoy typical regional dishes.

=== Pre-carnival ===
In Colombia, year-end festivities include an extended period, starting 7 December with the celebration of the eve of the traditional feast of the Immaculate Conception of Mary or "Day of the Little Candles", continuing with the celebration of the traditional Novena (16-24 December) and the Catholic Christmas, which tends to be extended until the feast of Epiphany, or 6 January.

During this very festive time, secular celebrations, such as Fool's Day on 28 December and New Year's Eve on 31 December are seen as a prelude to the Blacks' and Whites' Carnival.

==== Fools' Day (28 December) ====
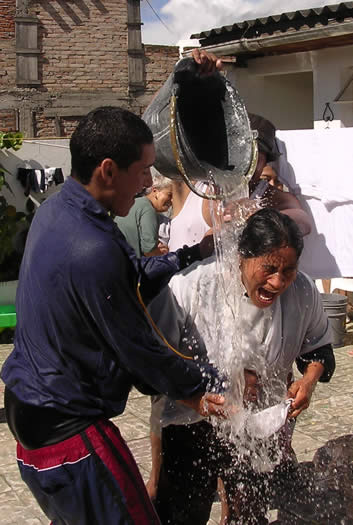
The All Fools' Day presents a dubious water game so-called Water Carnival

Water Carnival

On 28 December, the day of the Holy Innocents some Pastusos play with water in what may be considered a prelude to the January holidays, imitating carnival customs of the neighboring country of Ecuador where the Carnival of Quito (February or March) is characterized by the use of water fun. What was initially a day to do tricks, practical jokes, and spread hoaxes on the unwary, became a questionable game with water based on the desire to tease or surprise the unsuspecting, innocent pedestrians, soaking them completely.

This custom is not fully accepted and enjoyed, especially when the average temperature of the city hardly exceeds 13 °C (55 °F). Although the authorities have sought to control through bans on wastewater, the most practical solution to combat this phenomenon was found by Empopasto (Pasto Water Company), that day used to perform maintenance work on its two networks, cutting off water supplies throughout the urban area of the municipality, like a big practical joke on the players.

Moreover, since the late twentieth century, there have been advanced alternative activities that seek to provide the public recreation and culture without losing the carnival sense on 28 December among them are the innocent tour and the rainbow on the asphalt.

Rainbow in the Asphalt

In 1996, as a cultural and ecological alternative to the water carnival and collecting student initiatives from the Arts Department of the University of Nariño, establishing the proposed "Rainbow in the Asphalt". Through art imagination, with the color of chalk on the gray concrete inviting to recover urban space and regain the sense of carnival and celebration. So the pre-carnival in general, has changed, which seeks to keep the festive spirit through art, creating a new attitude to the festival and the city.

==== New Year's Eve Puppets (31 December) ====
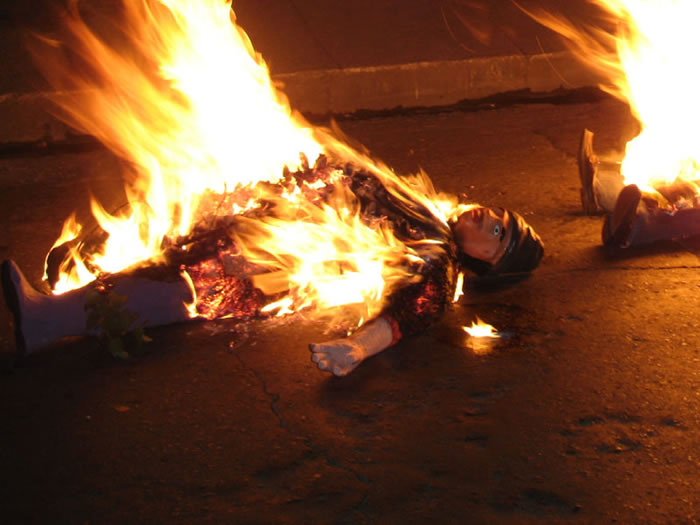
Figure of New Year's Eve being burned.

The 31 December of each year, Pasto streets are filled with dolls or puppets made from old clothes, paper and sawdust (formerly gunpowder) to represent the old year which will end at midnight when they are burned in a ritual with remote and deep meanings. From earlier in the day, kids who go to eager passersby with money requests such as "alms for the old year, please" and "widows" usually represented by men transdressed with dark veils aid request for "decent burial or cremation" of the "deceased year", after midnight. The main event of the day with crowd participation is a competition of puppets that are paraded through the main streets and usually represent political allegory, in which year the dying leaves in a "testament" full of ironies, summarizing all that has shown relevance in that year for the city and country. The creators of the best puppets, receive cash prizes.

This ensures a healthy and dignified spectacle. The winning design is burned in the Plaza del Carnaval at the end of the day, amid popular festivities usually organized by the municipal authorities to welcome the new year. At this time, the city begins to be filled with a playful and cathartic spirit resembling that of a carnival.

Starting in 2006, was banned the sale of Christmas gunpowder in the city, as established by Decree 0207 April 2005 as Mayor of Pasto and Corpocarnaval are the only entities authorized to organize events with fireworks to welcome the new year.

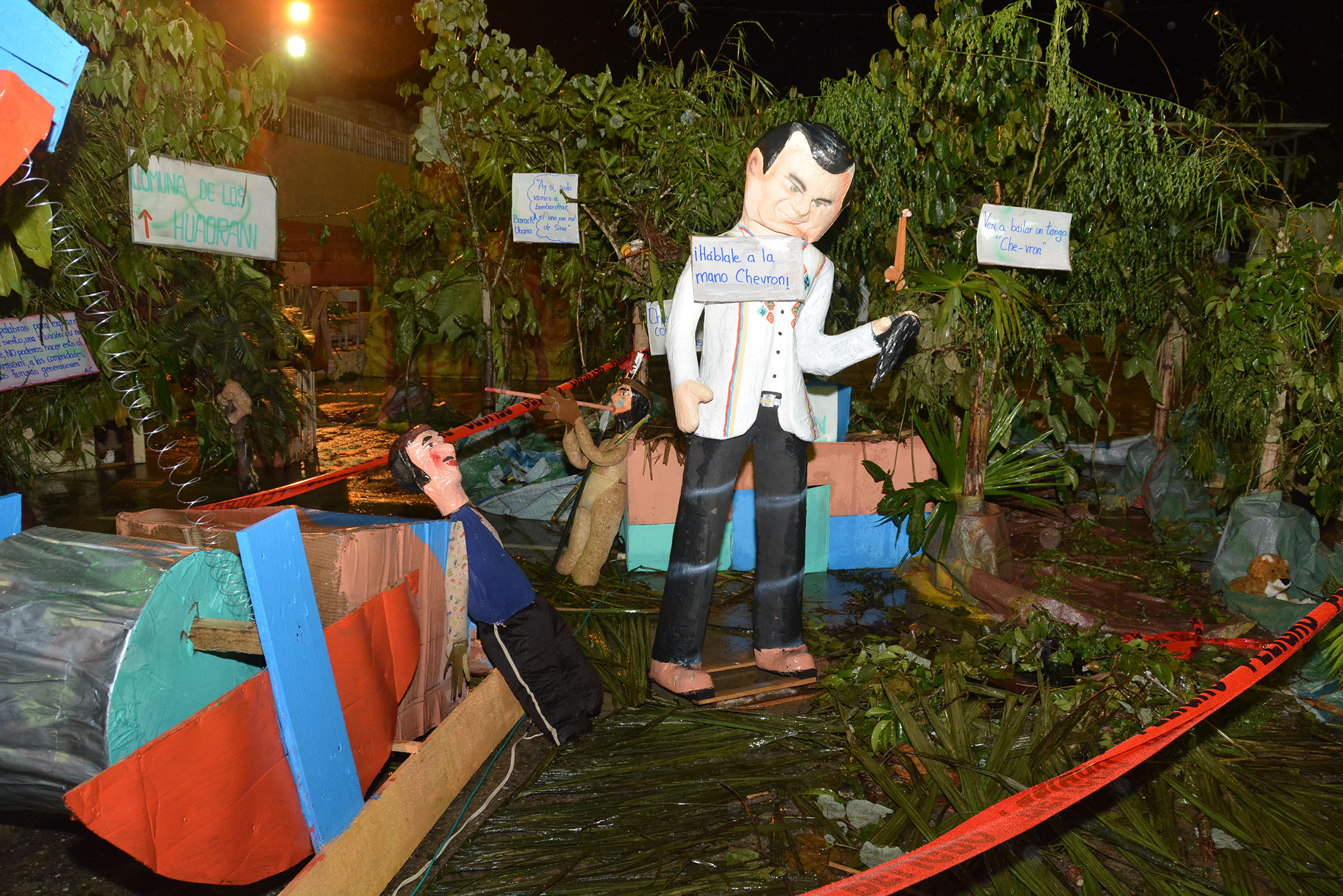
Concurso de años Viejos, 2013

== Carnival ==
=== Tribute to the Virgin of Mercy, Colonies Parade, and Rock Day (2 January) ===
From 2000, 2 January was added as an official day into the traditional Carnival programing, with several new acts:

Tribute to Our Lady of Mercy

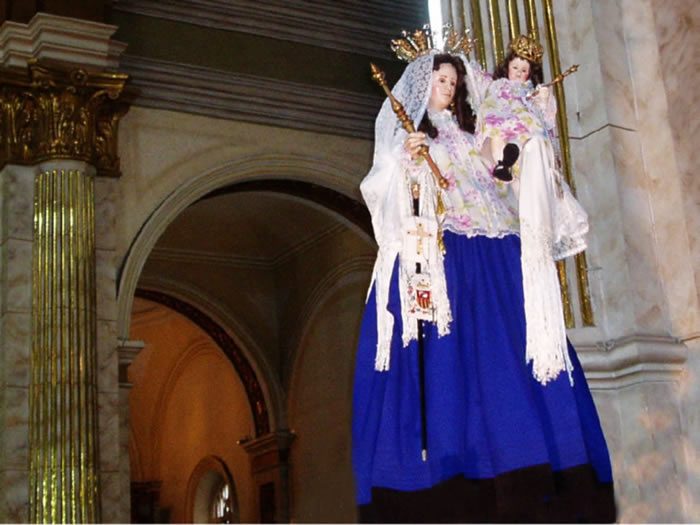
Virgin of Mercy dressed as Ñapanga

The Virgin of Mercy or "Our Lady of Mercy", is Governess of "La Ciudad Sorpresa" (The Surprise City, nickname of Pasto). Traditionally celebrated on 24 September, now she receives offerings of flowers and serenades from the nearby farmers, in exchange for her blessing on the new year.

Colonies Parade

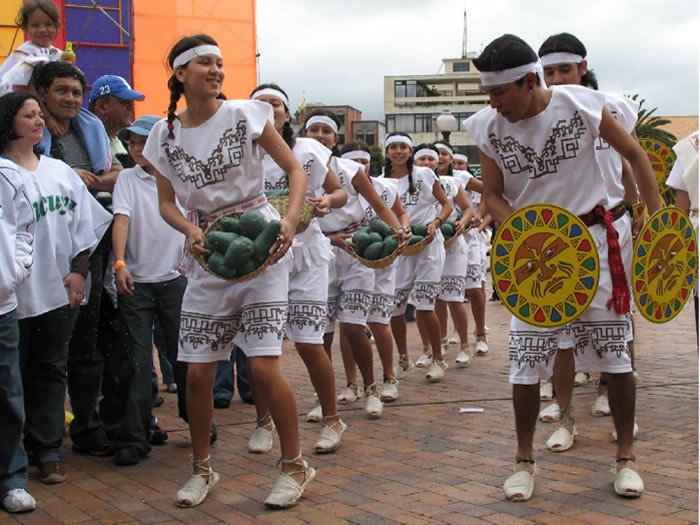
Dancers form Ancuya

Full of representations of community residents from other parts of the region or elsewhere in the country. Each with its own identity, the Colonies Parade is an opportunity to showcase the symbols that form part of the intrinsic character of each one.

Pastorock

Pastorock is an event for the development of alternative music: Blues, Rock en Español, Pop, Funk, Ska and Heavy metal. The permanence of this event for several years in the program has encouraged the emergence of products that combine rock and traditional music inspirations giving birth to new rhythms such as "Son Sureño Punk" and "Metal Pastuso".

=== The Carnavalito (Children's Carnival, 3 January) ===
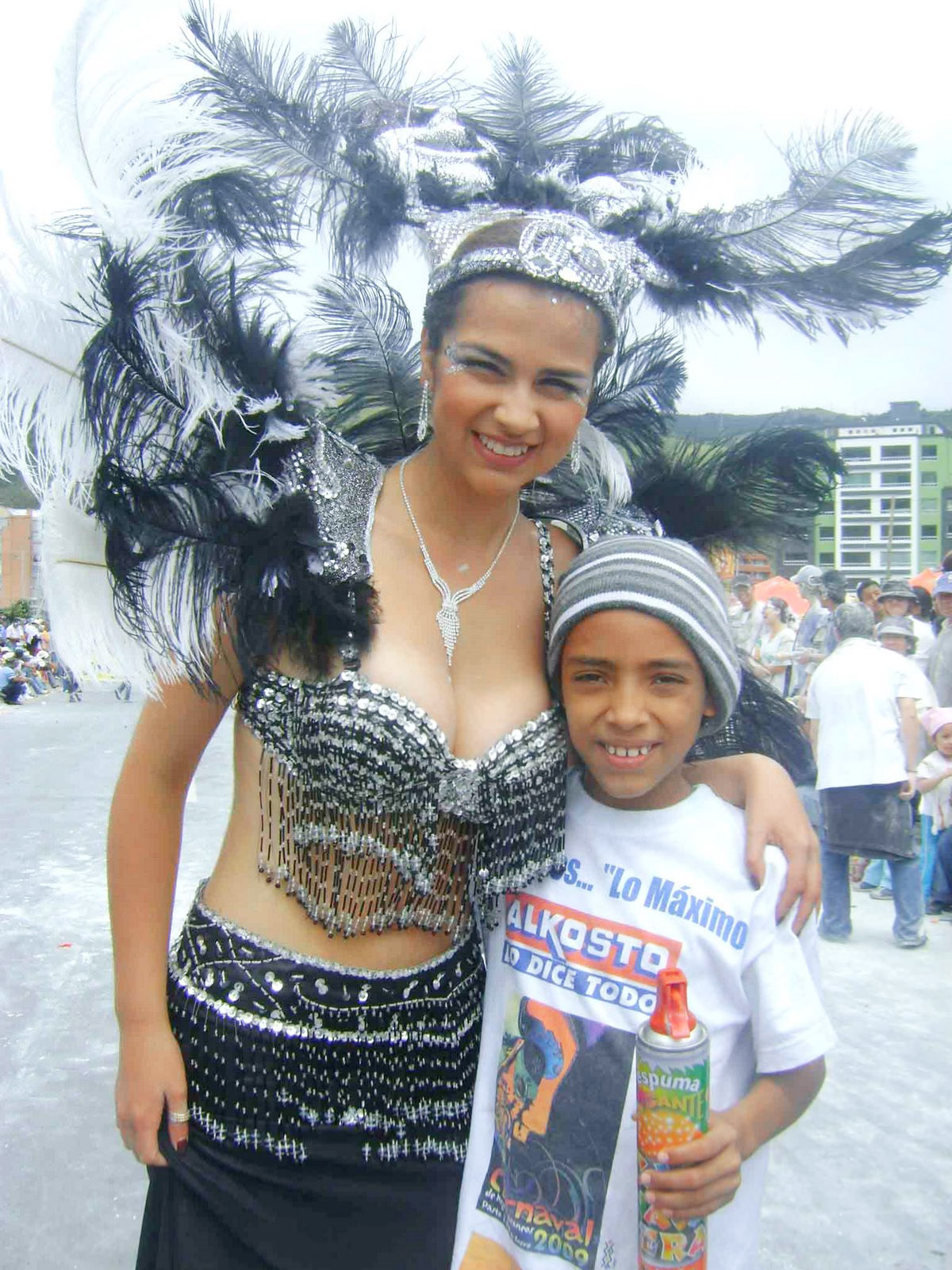
Children's Carnival, 3 January 2009.

3 January is the day of Carnavalito. What began as a game of children imitating their elders and recreating the Whites' day parade, has become an event with an identity and dynamic of its own within the Blacks' and Whites' festivities, with strong popular roots and support from the authorities.

From about 40 years ago, on the morning of this day, children have their own parade of mini-floats, that they designed and developed, in what is an initiation into elaborating floats and street allegories. Over time, the game has changed in parallel with physical and intellectual growth of the small artisans and players, whom at adulthood will participate in the Great Parade of 6 January.

Song to the Earth & Choreographic Collectives

A recent evening parade also takes place on 3 January: it's a tribute to andino sense, the mother land, and ancestral memory, with large groups of musicians and dancers. Previously all of them marched in the White's Day within the floats, now only winners of this parade win the right of participate in the Great Parade. It ends in a choreography of brotherhood and a great concert of Latin American music in the Liberty Stadium.

=== Arrival of the Castañeda Family (4 January) ===
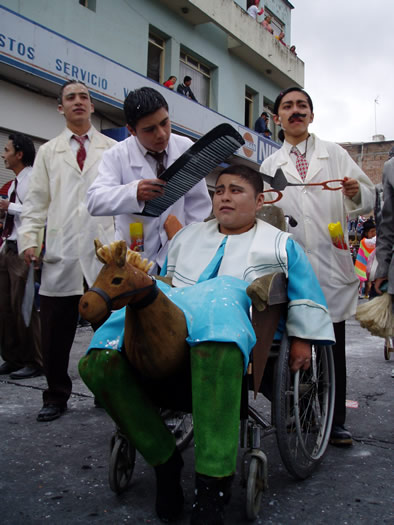
Comparsa of Barbers, Castañeda family, 4 January 2007.

The traditional parades of the Carnival of Pasto begin commemorating the arrival of the Castañeda Family on 4 January. As stated, the historical tradition indicates that celebrates the arrival of a family of colorful characters who came to Pasto from El Encano or from the east of the country (Putumayo) in 1929. Although their fate is unknown, it is also suggested that they were on pilgrimage to the Las Lajas south of the department of Nariño.

In any case, the characters in this family group, are represented and recreated in the stop of this day as a cartoon family that travels with all his luggage and kitchen utensils to prepare food anywhere in the path and is usually represented with its most picturesque or characteristic things, including the flamboyant grandmother, daughter ready to get married in white but with visible signs of pregnancy and mischievous children (usually characterized adults) who are in trouble with their nannies. It doesn't lack the troupe of "burlesque girls" who usually are men transdressed and finally the drunk priest.

The parade can not miss country dance groups and the ñapangas, disguised and authentic, whose picture is linked to the carnival in general.

=== Blacks' Day (5 January) ===
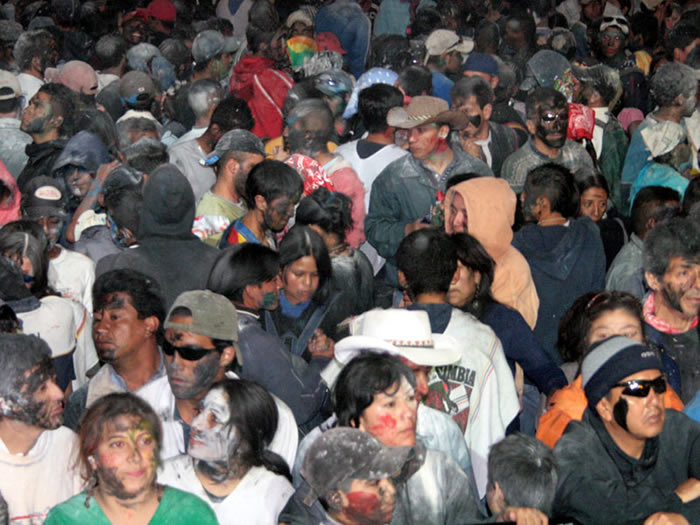
At 5 January, The people play in the streets with black cosmetic.

5 January is devoted to Blacks' Day. This day marks the date when African slaves were free to indulge their playful outbursts, the people play and dance in the streets to paint in black themselves, using cosmetic creams made for this purpose, but also use polishes and siliconed black paint. The motto of that day is: "¡Que vivan los Negros!" (Hurray for the Blacks!)

By tradition, the Carnival Queen travels through the city in a convoy, handing out cosmetics and inviting VIP tourists to join the game under the phrase: "¡Una pintica por favor!" (A little painting, please!) which was used in the early days of Carnival.

The importance of this day is all urban Pastusos, vented their repressed desires, since the cosmetic serves like a mask and at the same time to homogenize all social classes and ethnic groups as one great family settled on the slopes of Taita Urcunina.

Throughout the day, many orchestras presents in various city parks (a tradition adopted in the 1960s) and the local media (radio and TV) are devoted to visiting the various artisan workshops in order to discover the figures which decorate the floats for Whites' Day Great Parade.

=== Whites' Day (6 January) ===
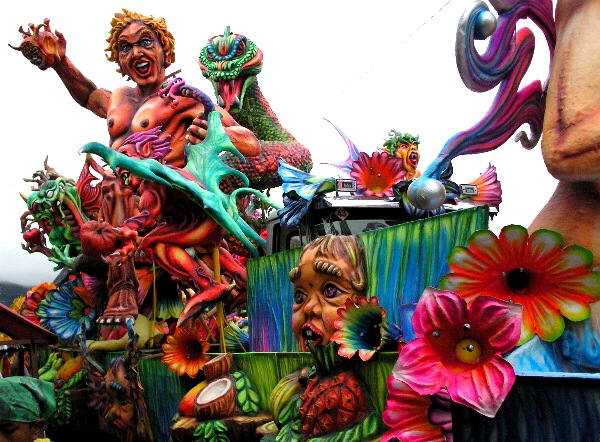
Great Parade float, 6 January 2006.

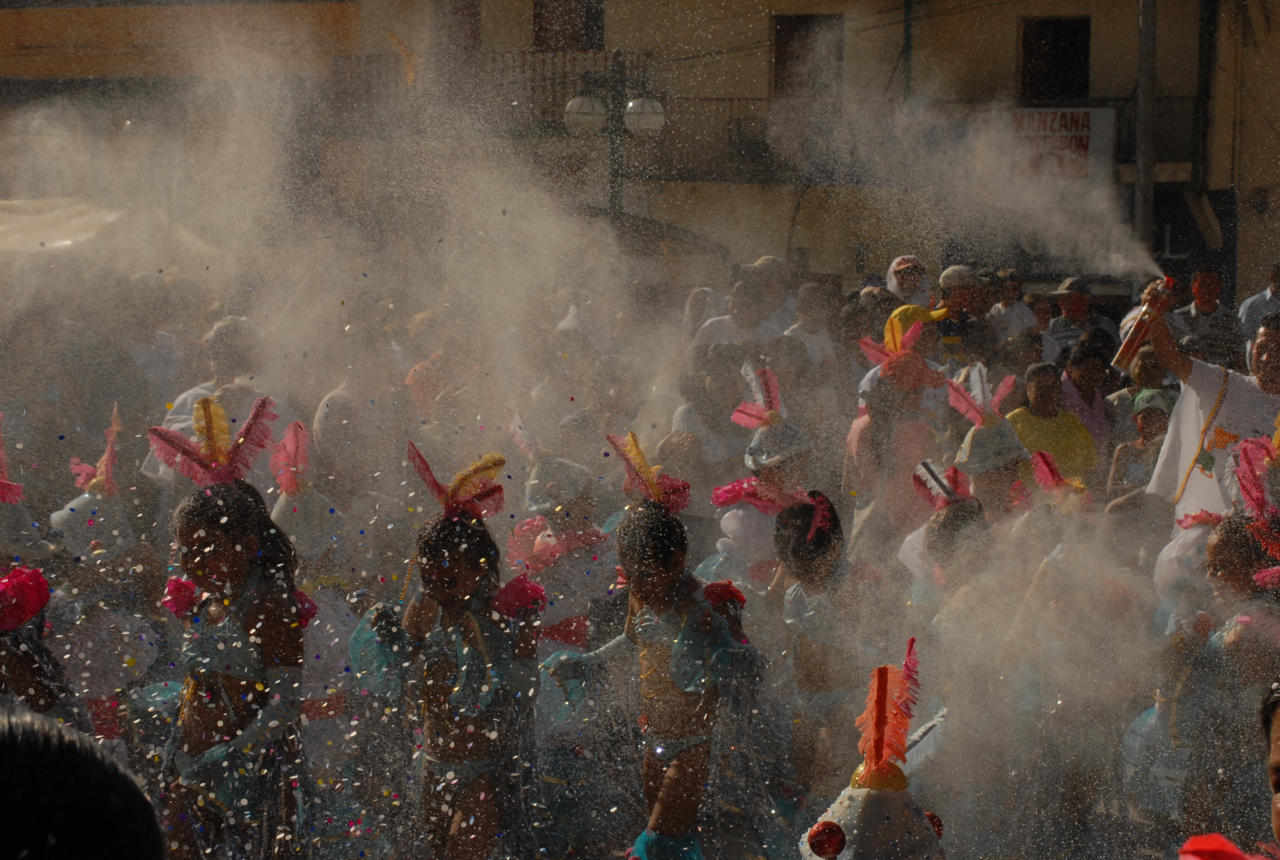
With talc is performed the Whites' Game

On 6 January this city no longer celebrates the Epiphany, but Whites' Day or Great Parade. In contrast to the previous day, on this date, Pastusos are painted white generally with talc fragrant, being used very little flour, cream or cosmetic paints.

The main attraction, as well as popular festivals in the squares and streets of the city, is the Grand Parade of nearly 7 km long on a path of about 15 km, running through the streets of downtown, the Plaza del Carnaval (Carnival Plaza) and some of the avenues of the periphery by the so-called Senda del Carnaval (Carnival Path). The majority of citizens and thousands of tourists and visitors crowd the streets to witness this parade, cheering and throwing confetti or streamers to the participants, all dancing to traditional and typical songs, such as the famous The Guaneña, El Trompo Sarandengue, The Southern Son, Chambú, Agualongo and the obligatory Sandoná masterpiece of bandsman Jorge Mideros; also are performed sayas and generally unpublished Andean compositions that premiere each year. The motto of that day is: "¡Que vivan los Blancos!" (Hurray for the Whites!) And in recent years has become inevitable to hear the exclamation ¡Viva Pasto, Carajo! (Hurray for Pasto, Da*n it!), pronounced by locals as well by tourists.

=== Great Parade (6 January) ===
The Great Parade consists of:

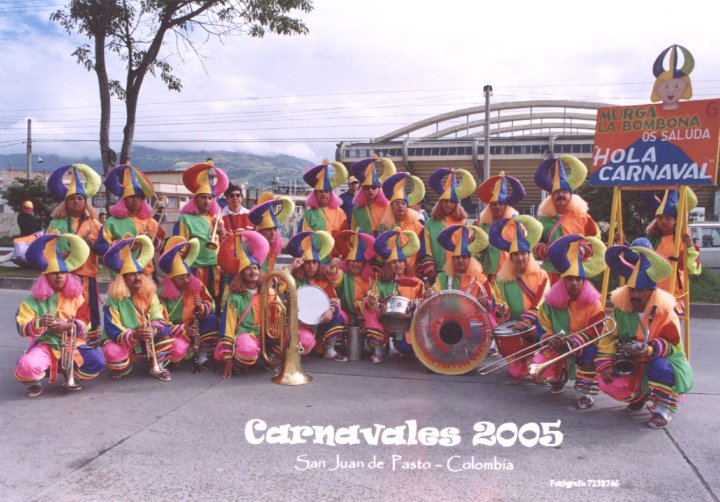
MurgaLa Bomboná before starting the Great Parade, January 2005.

- Individual costumes
- Comparsas: costumed groups of artists dancing and traveling on the streets.
- Murgas: groups of several dozen musicians.
- Mini-floats: Up to 20 x 40 feet high, moved by hand traction or by bicycle.
- Floats: Up to 50 x 65 feet long, taken up by trucks or trailers, where troupes made up of tourists who pay the right of way for participating in them, carry a costume that identifies each carriage. These massive structures are characterized by large rolling allegorical figures or caricatures with articulated movement (forward deployed by the Master Alfonso Zambrano), by design, finishing and complexity can become true works of art. This part of the parade is led by carnival queen in her own float (out of competition).

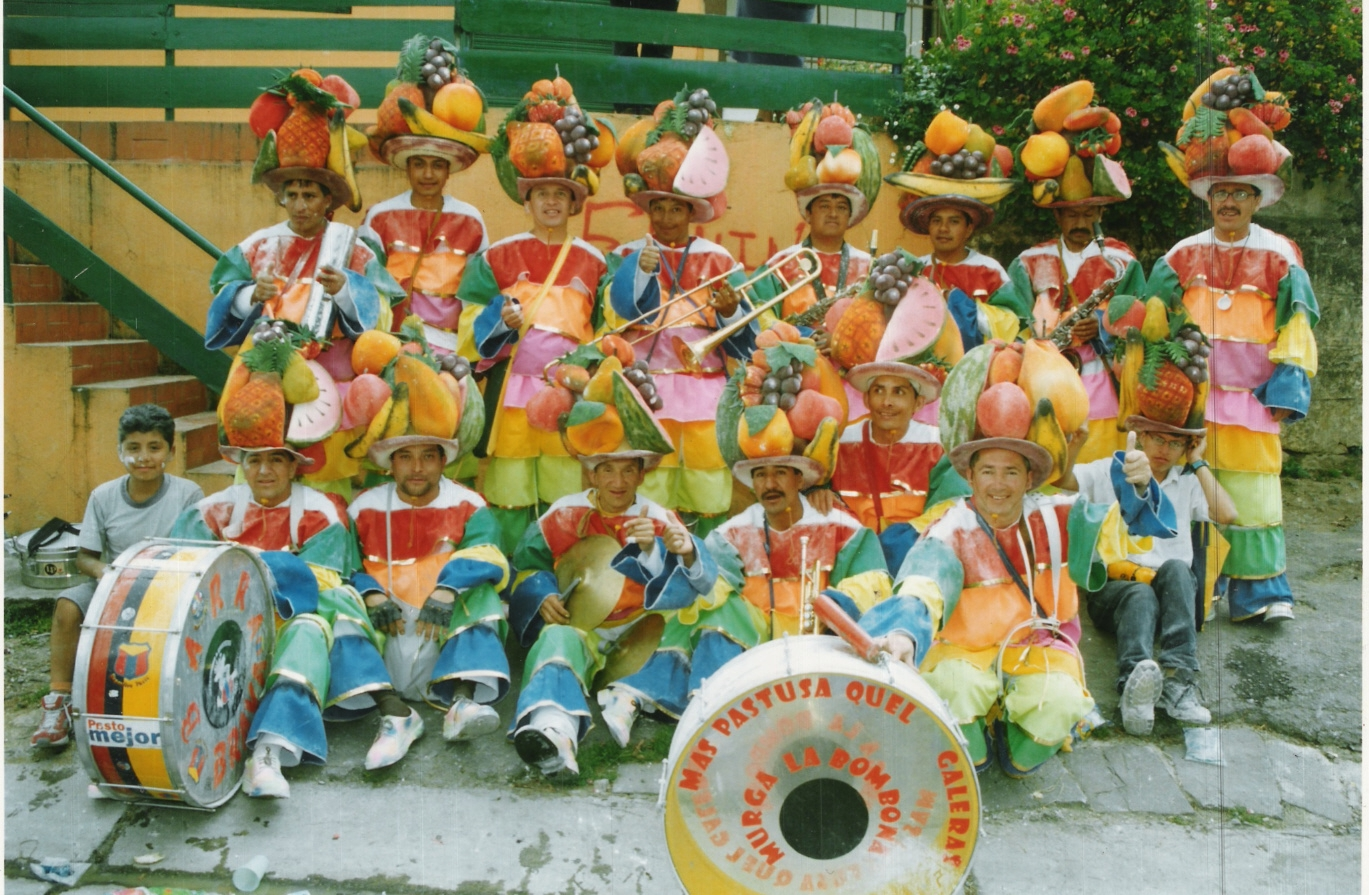
Murga La Bomboná at the end of the Great Parade, January 2004. (Note the talc in their costumes.)

The time to build a float for artisans is approximately 4 months due to the complexity of designs and motifs as well as its finished. In preparing the floats and masks or face shields, used the techniques of paper mache and pasteboard, to which in recent years have added the use of fiberglass thermoforming technique and polymer light, which are used in the preparation of designs and motifs characteristic arising from popular imagery, local myths, the social claims and stories that are part of the pastusa culture.

The event culminates with the awards to participants in the parade by the local government and Corpocarnaval. The originality and quality of such expressions is evaluated by a national panel of experts (sometimes international), with knowledge in visual arts and to ensure not only fairness but winning the Float than is the most colorful and representative of the carnival.

=== Rural Culture & Cuy's Festival (7 January) ===
This day is devoted to Remate (Finish) the Carnival with the celebration of "Cuy's Day (Guinea Pig's Day)" when locals and tourists delight the typical dish of the region, also many of them visit the near Guamuez Lake, and Obonuco and Catambuco rural fairs.

== The Artisans or Carnival Cultores ==
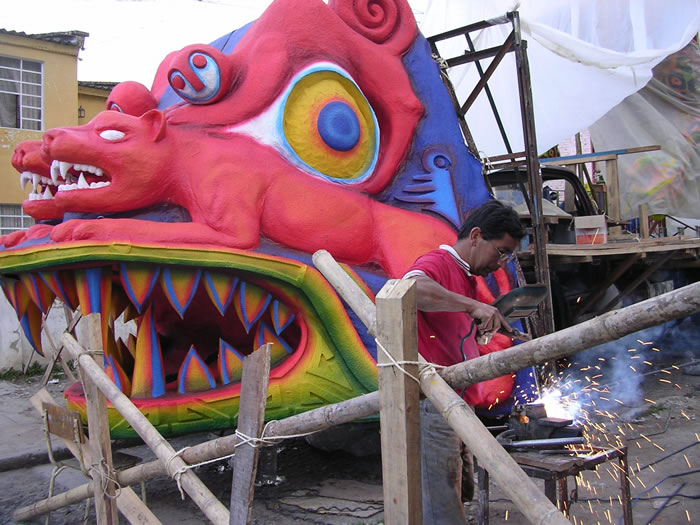
Carnival Artist or Artisan, Roberto Otero's workshop, 2006

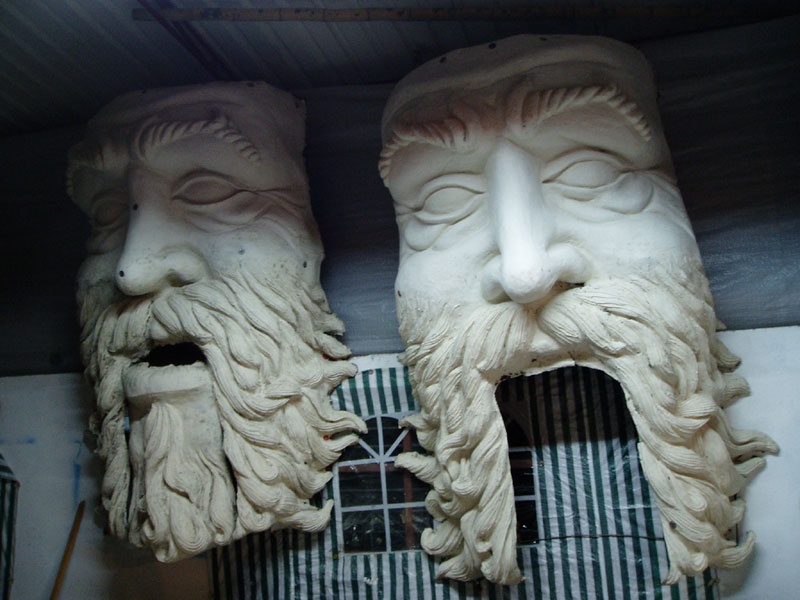
Carnival Artist or Artisan, Hugo Moncayo's workshop, 2007

The term "Carnival Cultores" is a neologism that links the terms "Culture" and "Actors", identifying mainly traditional "Carnival Artisans", but also extending to other people participating in parades through other modalities.

The word artisan has been traditionally used to describe the creators of the floats, excluding their families and partners involved in the preparation of the figures of the Great Parade. Some people prefer to use "Cultores" or "Carnival Artists" instead, both to be more inclusive and to emphasize the professional and artistic value of work of creating floats.

The Carnival Cultores are organized into two major associations: Asoarca and Caminantes del Carnaval (Carnival Walkers). The first one comprises mainly the float creators, while the second is for walking participants in costumes.

== See also ==
- Carnival in Colombia
- Festivals in Colombia
- Masterpieces of the Oral and Intangible Heritage of Humanity
- UNESCO Intangible Cultural Heritage Lists
- Afro-Colombian Day, Colombia
- Carnival
