= Afro-Colombian Day =

Colombian holiday

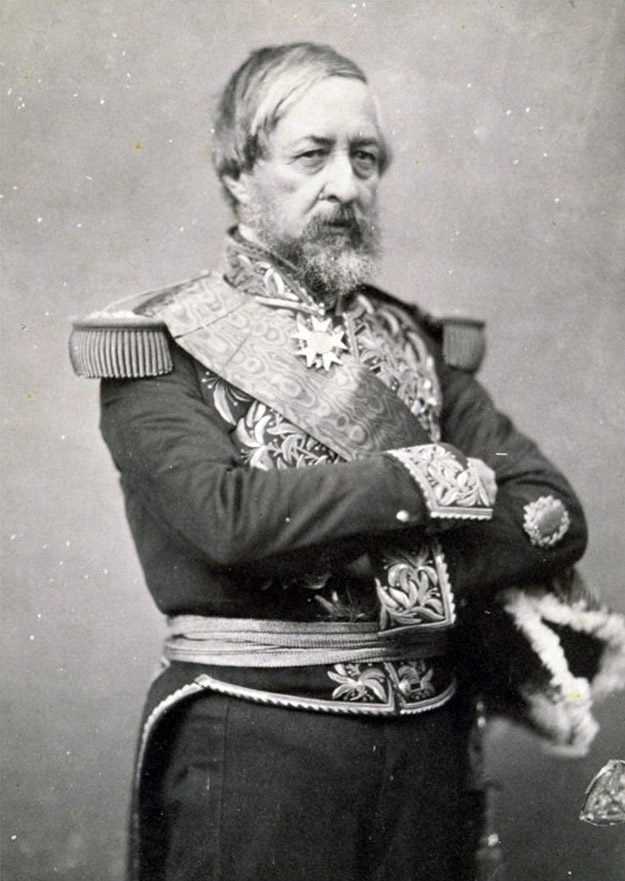
- General José Hilario López was president of Colombia when slavery was abolished in 1851.
- Official name: Día de la Afrocolombianidad
- Date: 21 May
- Next time: 21 May 2026
- Frequency: annual

Afro-Colombian Day (Día de la Afrocolombianidad) is an annual commemoration of the abolition of slavery in the Republic of Colombia on May 21, 1851. It is also the anniversary of the establishment of the first free town in the Americas, Palenque de San Basilio. Afro-Colombian Day was first celebrated in 2001.

Afro-Colombian Day celebrates the artistic, intellectual, and social contributions of Afro-Colombians in Colombia. During the event the people celebrate through food, music, art, and local folklore.

"For Rudesindo Castro, coordinator of ethno-education in the Black Community Organization (ORCONE, in its Spanish initials), "this celebration is a way of showing support to the Afro-Colombian community of our country." "The celebration also seeks to incentives the participation of the Afro community, public entities, private companies and the citizenship in general, under the motto of the actual administration, "Bogotá Without Indifference."

== See also ==
- Blacks and Whites' Carnival, Colombia
- Afro-Colombians

International:

- Black Awareness Day, Brazil
- Black History Month
- Juneteenth, United States
