= Festival of Industry, Trade and Culture (Itagüí) =

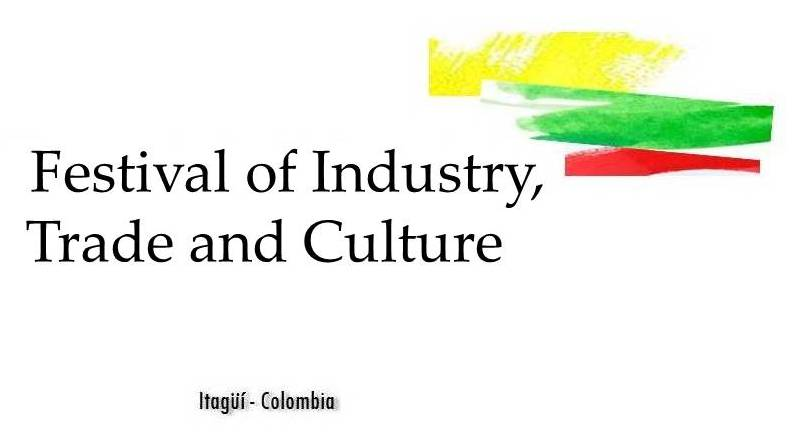
Festival logo

The Festival of Industry, Trade and Culture is an annual eight-day social and cultural festival held in Itagüi, Colombia. It showcases various types of music, photography, painting, dancing and theatre.

== History ==
In the mid- to late 1980s, the Itagüi administration created a festival to represent its culture and trading traditions. Beginning in 1984, the city celebrated the World Day of Laziness, which was accepted by both local and national communities. The success of the celebration encouraged city officials to create an eight-day Festival of Industry, Trade and Culture in 1989, which concluded with the World Day of Laziness.

The most recent celebration of the festival took place in 2012.
