= Festival of the Laurels =

Colombian festival celebrating vallento music

- Genre: vallenato

The Festival of the Laurels (Spanish: Festival Folclórico y Cultural de Los Laureles) is a festival in Colombia. The festival takes place in the town of Distraccion, in the Department of La Guajira. The festival is folkloric event and celebrates the vallenato music. The festival was named after the Laurel trees planted at the main plaza in downtown Distraccion.

== See also ==
- List of music festivals in Colombia
- List of festivals in La Guajira
- List of folk festivals
- Festivals in Colombia
