= List of festivals in La Guajira =

The following is a list of festivals or celebrations in the Colombian Department of La Guajira.

- Cradle of Accordions Festival
- Festival of the Laurels
- Festival of the Wayuu Culture
- Festival y Reinado Nacional del Carbón
- Festivities of Our Lady of the Remedies
- National Festival of the Dividivi

== See also ==
- Festivals in Colombia
