= National Festival of the Dividivi =

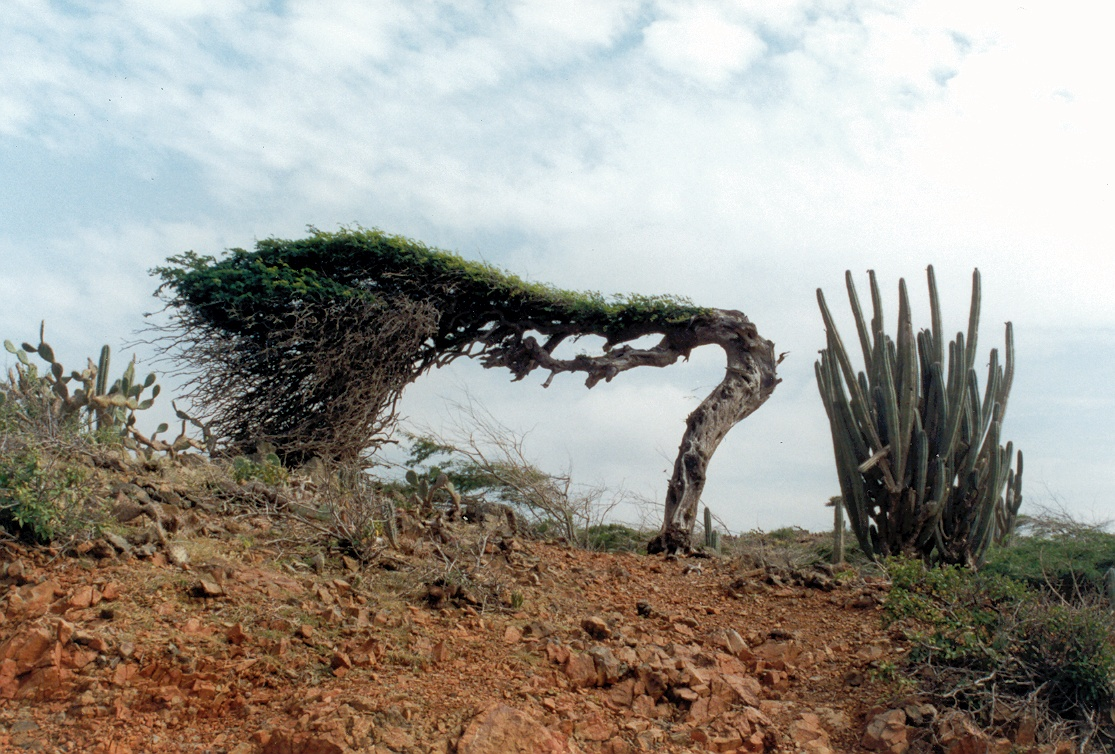
Divi-divi (Caesalpinia coriaria)

The National Festival of the Dividivi (Spanish: Festival y Reinado Nacional del Dividivi) is a festival in the Department of La Guajira, Colombia. The festival was created in 1969 by mandate of then mayor of Riohacha, Ernestina Serrano.

The National Festival of the Dividivi is named after the Dividivi tree (Caesalpinia coriaria), considered a symbol of the Department of La Guajira. The festival is celebrated every year from June 29 to July 1, the last day celebrating the creation of the Department of La Guajira.

== See also ==
- List of festivals in La Guajira
- Festivals in Colombia
