= Festivities of Our Lady of the Remedies =

Festival in Colombia

Festivities of Our Lady of the Remedies (Spanish: Fiesta Patronal Nuestra Señora de los Remedios) is a festival that takes place in the northern Colombian city of Riohacha, Department of La Guajira. The festival takes place between January 20 to February 9 of each year. The events vary from corralejas, street parties to horse races.

The festivities celebrates a legend of the Virgin Mary which dates back to Monday May 14, 1663. Riohacha was apparently subject to a tsunami-like wave, and tradition says the Virgin helped in calming down the inhabitants.

== See also ==
- Our Lady of the Mountain
- List of festivals in La Guajira
- Festivals in Colombia
