= Festival of Saint Francis of Assisi =

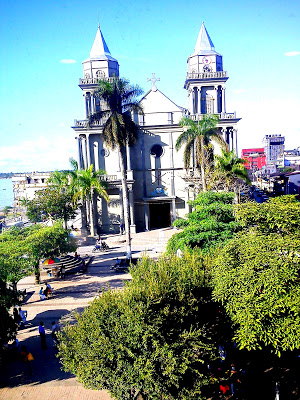
- Genre: Festival
- Date: 20 September–5 October
- Frequency: Annual
- Locations: Quibdó, Colombia

Festival of Saint Francis of Assisi, Quibdó
- UNESCO Intangible Cultural Heritage
- Country: Colombia
- Reference: 00640
- Region: Latin America and the Caribbean

Inscription history
- Inscription: 2012 (7th session)
- List: Representative

The Festival of Saint Francis of Assisi is an event celebrated annually in Quibdó, the capital of Chocó Department (Colombia), where religious and pagan expressions alternate. They start on 20 September and run until 5 October. They are a symbol of the Afro-Chocoan cultural identity, updating both the way in which the religious experience is assumed, as well as what is essential in the domain of music, dance and theater. It is a complex symbolic space that is part of the religious, social and political life of this population. Being a great reference of the Chocó culture, it is possible to see that the different Chocoan colonies in the rest of Colombia also celebrate their San Pachito.

The celebration is built from 12 neighborhoods corresponding to the municipality of Quibdó, on which falls the commitment to organize everything related to the festival. Every morning the Quibdoseños gather at the Franciscan mass, and in the afternoons the dance emerges as a liberating element and the theater recalls the facts of oppressive daily life and historical discrimination against the Afro-descendant population. On October 3, the image of the Saint travels along the river on rafts, and on the 4th the procession to the patron takes place, going through each of the neighborhoods, which make an offering to the Saint through the so-called mystery theater built in his honor. Although it is a patron saint's day, in honor of Saint Francis of Assisi, the celebration is very similar to a carnival.

In 2012, it was added to the UNESCO Intangible Cultural Heritage Lists.

== Music ==
The music that sets these festivities is composed of contradanzas, Chocoan bundes, Chocoan mazurkas, Chocoan joints, Chocoan polkas, among other rhythms performed by an ensemble called chirimía.
