= World Day of Laziness =

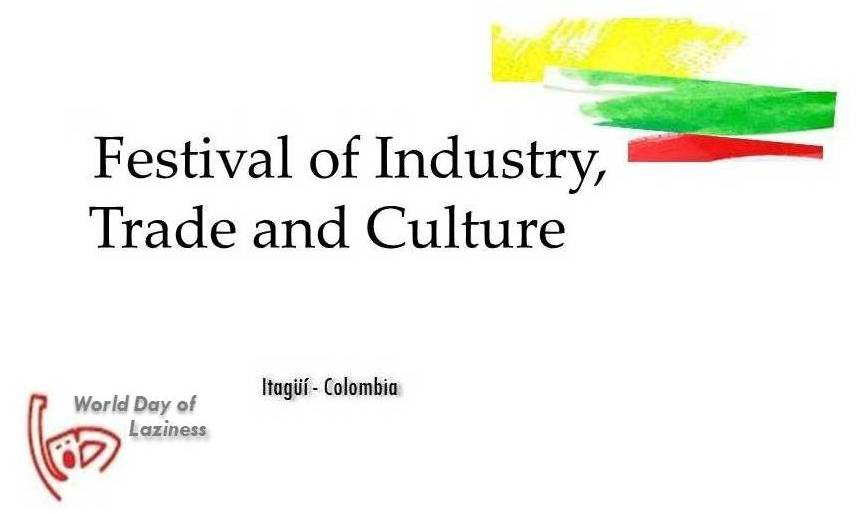
- Country: Colombia
- Headquarters: Itagüí

Programming
- Language: Español
- Picture format: 480i (SDTV); 1080i (HDTV)

Ownership
- Owner: Alcaldia de Itagüí

History
- Launched: August 11, 1984

The World Day of laziness (festival) is the closing day of the Festival of Industry, Trade and Culture held in the city of Itagüi - Colombia. This social and cultural festival presents many genres of music: jazz, blues, salsa, rock, hip-hop, reggaeton, vallenato, electronic music, reggae and pop. In addition, the festival features photography exhibitions, painting, dance, musical and theater.

== History ==
The World Day of Laziness was founded in 1984 to mark the closing day of the Festival of Industry, Trade and Culture. Its ethos suggests that the modern world needs to relax and learn to enjoy art, culture, and rest.

In 2012 the World Day of Laziness began to be recognized internationally.

== See also ==
- List of music festivals in Colombia
- List of pop festivals
- Festival of Industry, Trade and Culture
- Musical theatre
- Itagüí
- Medellín
