= El Encano =

- Location in Nariño and Colombia El Encano (Colombia)
- Coordinates: 1°9′42.498″N 77°9′18.0756″W
- Country: Colombia
- Department: Nariño
- Municipality: Pasto municipality
- Elevation: 9,280 ft (2,830 m)

Population (2005)
  - Total: 773
- Time zone: UTC-5 (Colombia Standard Time)

El Encano is a settlement in Pasto Municipality, Nariño Department in Colombia.

== Climate ==
El Encano has a subtropical highland climate (Köppen Cfb) characterised by pleasant afternoons, cool mornings and persistent fog with extremely limited sunshine year-round. Rainfall is moderate to heavy throughout the year, with the wettest months being from April to June.

Climate data for El Encano
Month	Jan	Feb	Mar	Apr	May	Jun	Jul	Aug	Sep	Oct	Nov	Dec	Year
Mean daily maximum °C (°F)	16.5 (61.7)	16.6 (61.9)	16.3 (61.3)	16.3 (61.3)	15.9 (60.6)	14.8 (58.6)	14.2 (57.6)	14.2 (57.6)	15.2 (59.4)	16.5 (61.7)	16.8 (62.2)	16.8 (62.2)	15.8 (60.5)
Daily mean °C (°F)	12.0 (53.6)	12.0 (53.6)	12.0 (53.6)	12.1 (53.8)	11.9 (53.4)	11.3 (52.3)	10.6 (51.1)	10.5 (50.9)	11.1 (52.0)	11.8 (53.2)	12.2 (54.0)	12.3 (54.1)	11.6 (53.0)
Mean daily minimum °C (°F)	8.4 (47.1)	8.5 (47.3)	8.6 (47.5)	8.8 (47.8)	8.9 (48.0)	8.6 (47.5)	7.8 (46.0)	7.6 (45.7)	7.3 (45.1)	8.0 (46.4)	8.5 (47.3)	8.4 (47.1)	8.3 (46.9)
Average rainfall mm (inches)	85.5 (3.37)	89.3 (3.52)	104.2 (4.10)	142.1 (5.59)	149.0 (5.87)	145.6 (5.73)	136.3 (5.37)	104.2 (4.10)	82.9 (3.26)	100.5 (3.96)	111.0 (4.37)	98.1 (3.86)	1,348.7 (53.1)
Average rainy days (≥ 1 mm)	21	19	23	25	26	26	25	25	23	22	21	22	278
Average relative humidity (%)	85	86	86	87	87	88	88	87	86	85	85	86	86
Mean monthly sunshine hours	99.2	76.2	65.1	60.0	62.0	63.0	65.1	68.2	72.0	89.9	93.0	102.3	916
Mean daily sunshine hours	3.2	2.7	2.1	2.0	2.0	2.1	2.1	2.2	2.4	2.9	3.1	3.3	2.5
