= Boyacá International Cultural Festival =

Cultural festival in Colombia

Festival Internacional de la Cultura de Boyacá
- Locations: Tunja, Colombia
- Years active: 1973-present
- Attendance: 300.000 (2014)
- Website: Official Website (in Spanish)

The Boyacá International Cultural Festival (Spanish: Festival Internacional de la Cultura de Boyacá or just FIC) is one of the major international cultural events held annually in Colombia. The festival presents works in various arts such as music, theater, dance, literature, academy, visual arts, cinema – audiovisual, cultural heritage cultural exchanges and meetings at various stages in the city of Tunja since 1973. Artists from different corners of the world intertwine their knowledge and their cultures into one universal feeling, through the medium of art, the best mechanism to achieve peace and brotherhood of people. The FIC gathers thousands of artists and has more than 300,000 visits to about 500 events per version. The festival is considered to be one of the most representative of music, dance, the arts, theater, cultural heritage, literature, cinema and expressions of human sensibility.

The 44th version of the Boyacá International Cultural Festival will take place from 27 October – 5 November 2016.

== History ==
The Festival was created in 1973 under the name of "International Culture Week". In 1981, name as the Boyacá International Cultural Festival, it became one of the most important cultural events in Latin America. The FIC gathers thousands of artists and has more than 300,000 visits to about 500 events per version. The Festival was conceived to meet different cultural and artistic events of international order. In the 1990s the event was held during two weeks with concerts of symphony and chamber orchestras, choirs, soloists and equally folk and classical ballet, traditional groups and street theater and puppet shows, conferences and cinema, art exhibitions, folk art, book fair and conferences. Over four decades, the biggest cultural event of the department has developed and grown into a design which educates and shares diverse and exciting cultures from around the world.

The great receptivity of the city has been essential in the success of the event, and no doubt the cultural level that old tradition has identified the local population, year after year, increased their attendance and participation at all levels.

Year	Version	Special guest country	Guest department
1973-2008	1st-26th	-	-
2009	37th	Japan	-
2010	38th	China	Guajira
2011	39th	Spain	Valle del Cauca
2012	40th	Costa Rica	Antioquia
2013	41st	Spain	Meta
2014	42nd	Germany and Mexico	Nariño
2015	43rd	Russia and Brazil and India	Bolívar and Arauca
2016	44th	Cuba	-

== See also ==
- List of classical music festivals in South America
- List of music festivals in Colombia
