= Distracción, La Guajira =

Coordinates: 10°54′N 72°53′W

Distracción
- town
- Flag Coat of arms
- Nickname: The Star of La Guajira
- Location of the town and municipality of Distracción in La Guajira Department.
- Country: Colombia
- Region: Caribbean
- Department: La Guajira
- Foundation: 1845 by Antonio María Vidal

Government
  - Mayor: Pedro Javier Guerra Chinchia (L)

Area
  - Total: 220 km^{2} (85 sq mi)
- Elevation: 65 m (213 ft)

Population (Census 2018)
  - Total: 11,934
  - Density: 54/km^{2} (140/sq mi)
- Time zone: UTC-5
- Climate: Aw

Distracción (Spanish pronunciation: [distɾaɣˈsjon]) is a town and municipality in the Colombian Department of La Guajira. Founded in 1845 by a man from neighboring Barrancas named Antonio María Vidal on the right margin of the Ranchería River.

The town celebrates the Festival de los Laureles (Spanish for Festival of the Laurels). The town's economy relies mostly in agriculture, farming and the rudimentary exploitation of a limestone mine.

== Geography ==
The municipality of Distracción is located in the Guajira Peninsula, on the Valley of Upar formed by the mountains of the Sierra Nevada de Santa Marta and Serranía del Perijá. It has a total area of 220 km² bordering to the north with the municipality of Riohacha; to the east with the municipality of Fonseca; to the south with the municipalities of San Juan del Cesar and Fonseca and to the west with the municipality of San Juan del Cesar.

== Politics ==
=== Defense ===
The Colombian National Army has two major units in the department part of the 1st Division one of these is the 2nd Mechanized Cavalry Battalion also known as the Batallon Rondon.
