= Yipao =

Folkloric celebration in Quindío, Colombia

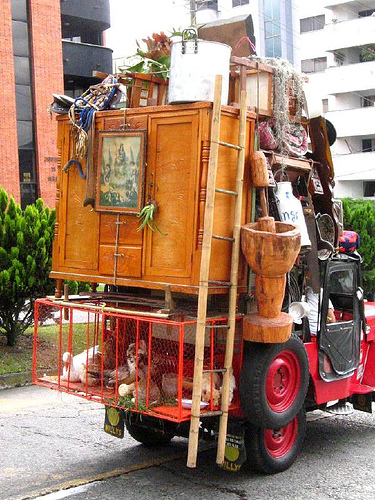
El Yipao

The Yipao or Jeep parade is folkloric celebration in the Colombian department of Quindío, specially during the anniversary parties of the departmental capital Armenia.

== Jeep-Willys history in Colombia ==
The first Jeeps (M38 or CJ-2A models) arrived to Colombia in 1946 for military purposes. They were imported by the Colombian Ministry of Defense and soon became very popular among Colombian coffee farmers who saw in this vehicle the needed qualities for the difficult roads in the mountainous region of the country. Besides the transportation of coffee, Jeeps are used to transport many other agricultural products, as well as country workers to places previously accessible only to pack animals. Due to this quality, the Jeeps are also known locally in Spanish: "mulitas mecánicas"(or mechanical mules).

== Jeeps and culture ==
Many families in the Paisa region and Colombian Coffee-Growers Axis own Jeep vehicles, which have become a beloved symbol of the coffee culture. Often the Jeeps have many ornaments, icons, and flashy accessories, in a kitsch style.

== The parade ==
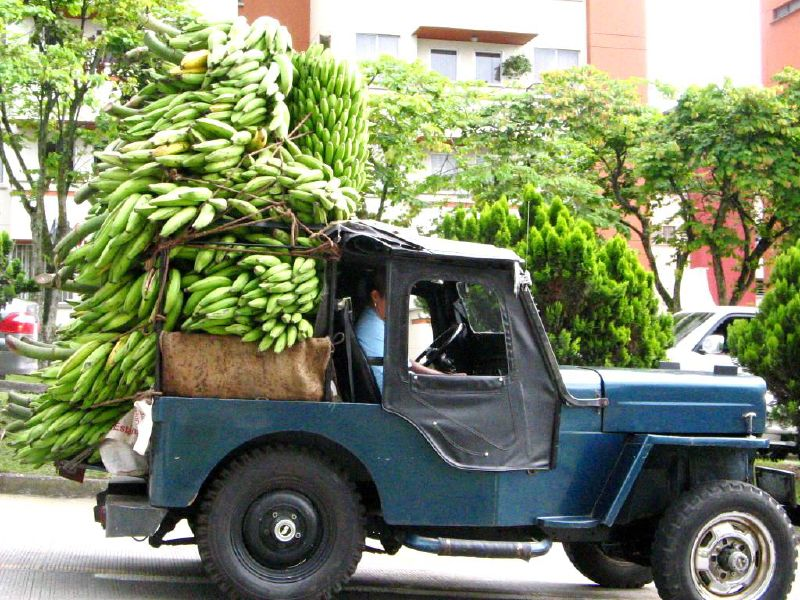
Jeep loaded with plantains

The Yipao parade is celebrated during anniversary parties both in Armenia, Quindío and Calarcá, Quindío. The first edition of the parade was organized by Mrs Joan Jaramillo, headmistress of protocol of the Quindio Governor's office in 1988. The event has several categories separated according to the products carried in the vehicles:

- Agricultural products
- Coffee
- Furniture
- People
- Institutional advertisement

The vehicles are driven by the main streets of the city and the Jeeps with the largest number of objects carried and the most harmonious arrangements earn prizes.

In February 2006, a Guinness World Records was established for the "Longest Jeep Parade" in Calarca, with a caravan of over 370 Jeep Willys vehicles.
