= Cali Underground =

Annual rock music festival in Colombia

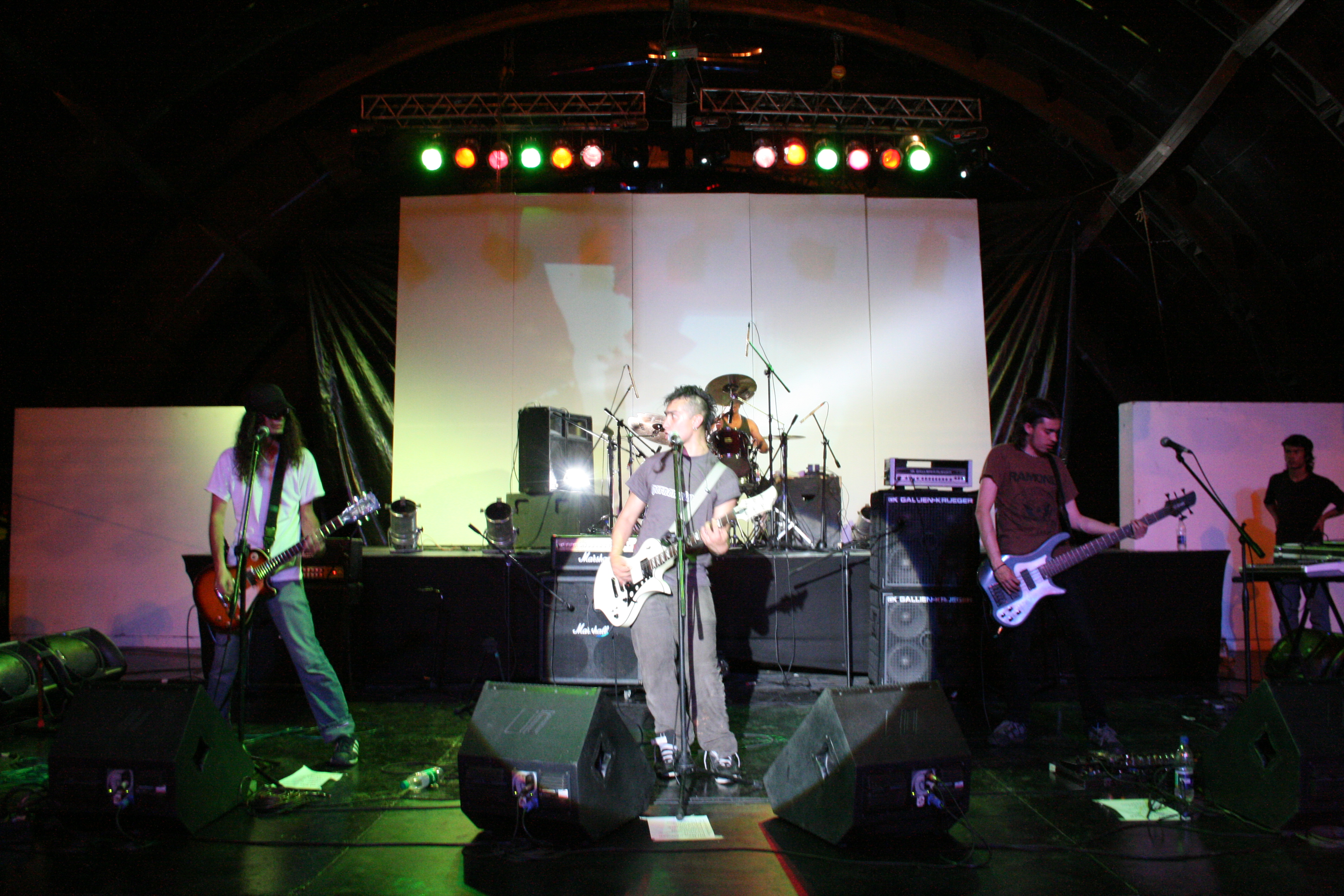
- Genre: Rock music

Cali Underground is an annual rock music festival celebrated in Cali, Colombia. Bands as Angelcorpus, Ultimos Romanticos, Astreas Domains, Desdenia, Deadline and Orus have played at this festival.

== History ==
The festival first ran in 2004, with a few hundred audience members, and a few relatively unknown bands, but in the following years the number of visitors increased to several thousand. After obtaining the support of the Secretaria de Cultura y Turismo de Santiago de Cali and private enterprises like Parquesoft and Deeplunar the festival has drawn increased attendance.

== See also ==
- List of music festivals in Colombia
- Music of Colombia
