= Wonders of the World (disambiguation) =

Wonders of the World are lists compiled over the ages that catalogue remarkable natural and man-made constructions.

Wonder(s) of the World or Seven Wonders may also refer to:

== Lists ==
=== Global lists ===
- Seven Wonders of the Ancient World, the traditional ancient list
- New 7 Wonders of the World, a 2007 list of wonders
- New 7 Wonders of Nature, a 2011 list of natural wonders

=== National lists ===
- Seven Wonders of Canada
- Seven Wonders of Colombia
- Seven Wonders of Poland
- Seven Wonders of Portugal
  - Seven Wonders of Portuguese Origin in the World
- Seven Wonders of Russia
- Seven Wonders of Ukraine
- Seven Wonders of Wales
- Seven Wonders of Brazil
- Seven Natural Wonders of the UK

=== Other lists ===
- Seven Wonders of Jena, seven historical attractions in the German city of Jena
- Seven Natural Wonders of Africa

== Games ==
- 7 Wonders (video game), a 1997 platform video game
- 7 Wonders (board game), 2010, by Antoine Bauza
- 7 Wonders of the Ancient World (video game), a 2007 puzzle video game

== Literature ==
- Seven Ancient Wonders, a thriller novel by Matthew Reilly
- Seven Wonders (series), a series of books from Peter Lerangis
- Wonder of the World (play), by David Lindsay-Abaire
- Wonders of the Invisible World, a book by Cotton Mather
- Wonders of the Invisible World (McKillip collection), a collection of fantasy stories by Patricia A. McKillip
- The Wonderful Wonder of Wonders, a satirical essay by Jonathan Swift

== Music ==
- The Seven Wonders of the World (album), by Rick Wakeman
- Wonders of the World (album), by the Long Beach Dub Allstars
- Wonder of the World (album), 2008, by Rush of Fools
- "Seven Wonders" (song), a Fleetwood Mac song
- "Seven Wonders", a song by Nickel Creek from their 2002 album This Side
- "WOTW / POTP" ("Wonder of the World / Power of the People"), a song by Coldplay from the 2019 album Everyday Life
- 9th Wonder, American Hip-Hop DJ/Producer

== Film and television ==
- Seven Wonders of the World (film), a 1956 Cinerama film
- Seven Natural Wonders, a 2005 BBC television series
- Seven Wonders of the Industrial World, a 2003 BBC television documentary series
- "The Seven Wonders" (American Horror Story), series finale of American Horror Story: Coven

== See also ==
- Eighth Wonder (disambiguation)
- Wonderworld (disambiguation)
- World of wonder (disambiguation)
- "The world wonders", a phrase at the heart of a misunderstood message between Fleet Admiral Chester Nimitz and Admiral William Halsey Jr., during World War II
- Wonders of the World, the New 52 era of the DC Comics superhero team, the Justice Society on Earth 2
