= Seven Natural Wonders of Africa =

User-generated voting competition

The Seven Natural Wonders of Africa was a competition where the seven were selected by voting on February 11, 2013.

== Seven Wonders of Africa ==
Image	Nominee	Location
	Red Sea Reef	Coast of Egypt, Eritrea, and Sudan
	Mount Kilimanjaro	Tanzania
	Sahara Desert	Algeria, Chad, Egypt, Libya, Mali, Mauritania, Morocco, Niger, Sudan, Tunisia, Western Sahara
	Serengeti Migration	Tanzania and Kenya
	Ngorongoro Crater	Tanzania
	Nile river	Ethiopia, Sudan, Egypt, Uganda, Democratic Republic of the Congo, Kenya, Tanzania, Rwanda, Burundi, South Sudan, Eritrea
	Okavango Delta	Botswana

== See also ==
- Wonders of the World (disambiguation)
- Wonders of the World
