= Eighth Wonder =

Eighth Wonder or 8th Wonder may refer to:

- Eighth Wonder of the World, a historical term

== Music ==
=== Groups ===
- Eighth Wonder (band), an English pop band formed in 1983

=== Albums ===
- Eighth Wonder (album), a 2013 album by Japanese pop group AAA
- 8th Wonder (album), a 1982 album by the Sugarhill Gang
- Feel gHood Muzik : The 8th Wonder, a 2009 album released by Drunken Tiger

=== Songs ===
- "8th Wonder" (song), by the Sugarhill Gang (1980)
- "8th World Wonder", the 2004 debut single by Kimberley Locke
- "Eighth Wonder", a 2009 song by Lemon Demon on the 2016 album Spirit Phone
- "8th Wonder", a 2009 song by Gossip on the album Music for Men

== Other uses ==
- The Eighth Wonder, an opera by Alan John

== See also ==
- Wonders of the World (disambiguation)
