= Belém Tower =

Fortified tower in Lisbon, Portugal

- Torre de Belém, Torre de São Vicente
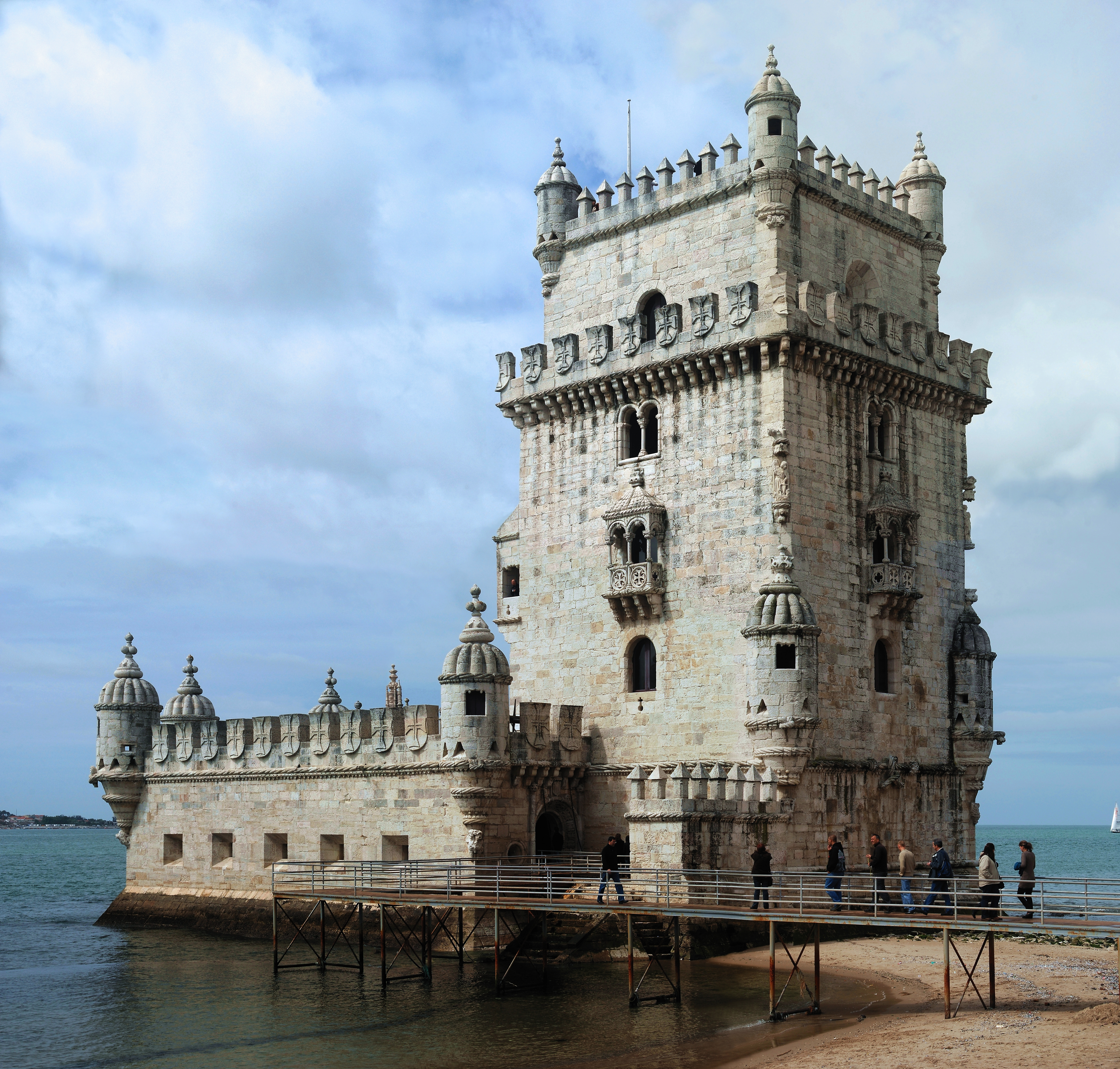
- The quarter façade of the tower on the bank of the Tagus river
- Interactive map of Belém Tower
- Location: Lisbon, Portugal
- Coordinates: 38°41′30″N 9°12′58″W
- Designer: Francisco de Arruda
- Type: Fortification
- Material: Limestone (lioz)
- Visitors: 377.780 visitors (2022)
- Beginning date: c. 1514
- Completion date: 1519
- Website: www.patrimoniocultural.gov.pt/pt/museus-e-monumentos/dgpc/m/torre-de-belem/

UNESCO World Heritage Site
- Part of: Monastery of the Hieronymites and Tower of Belém in Lisbon
- Criteria: Cultural: iii, vi
- Reference: 263bis
- Inscription: 1983 (7th Session)

Portuguese National Monument
- Type: Non-movable
- Criteria: National monument
- Designated: 10 January 1907
- Reference no.: IPA.00004065

Belém Tower (Portuguese: Torre de Belém, pronounced [ˈtoʁɨ ðɨ βɨˈlɐ̃j]; literally: Bethlehem Tower), officially the Tower of Saint Vincent (Portuguese: Torre de São Vicente), is a 16th-century fortification located in Lisbon, Portugal, which served as a point of embarkation and disembarkation for Portuguese explorers and as a ceremonial gateway to Lisbon. The tower symbolizes Portugal's maritime and colonial power in early modern Europe. It was built during the height of the Portuguese Renaissance and is a prominent example of the Portuguese Manueline style, but it also incorporates other architectural styles, such as the minarets, which are inspired by Moorish architecture. The structure was built from lioz limestone, a material local to the Lisbon region, and is composed of a bastion and a 30-metre (100 ft) four-storey tower.

Since 1983, the tower has been a UNESCO World Heritage Site, along with the Jerónimos Monastery. It is often portrayed as a symbol of Europe's Age of Discoveries and as a metonym for Portugal or Lisbon, given its landmark status. It has incorrectly been stated that the tower was built in the middle of the Tagus and now sits near the shore because the river was redirected after the 1755 Lisbon earthquake. In fact, the tower was built on a small island in the Tagus river near the Lisbon shore.

== History ==
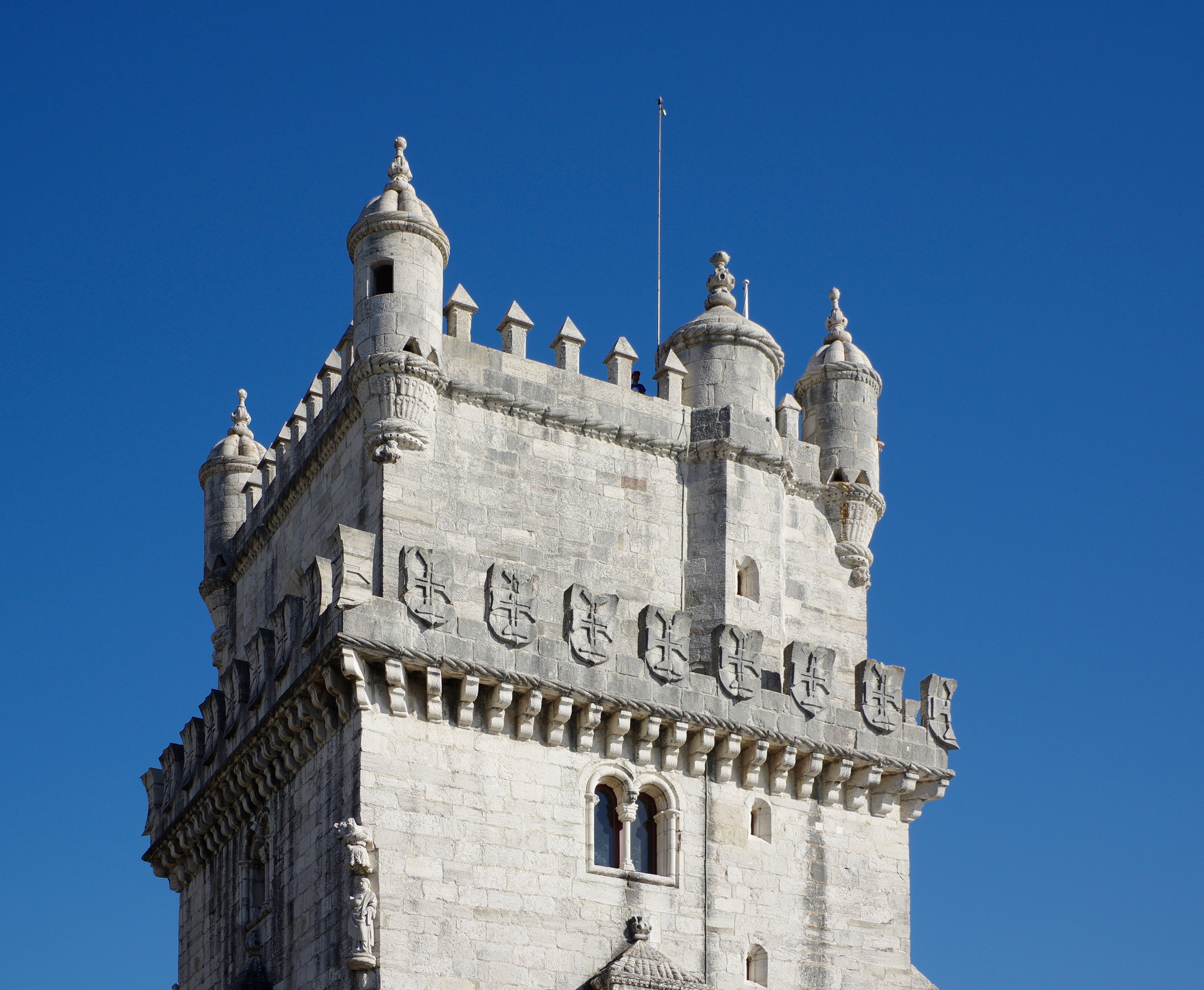
The tower was classified as a UNESCO World Heritage Site in 1983 and included in the registry of the Seven Wonders of Portugal in 2007.

In the late 15th century, King John II had designed a defence system for the mouth of the Tagus that depended on the fortresses of Cascais and São Sebastião (or Torre Velha) in Caparica on the south side of the river. These fortresses did not completely protect the river's mouth, and further protection was required. In his "Chronicle of John II" (Chronica de D. Joao II), which appeared in 1545, the author Garcia de Resende affirmed the king's opinion that the defences of Lisbon were inadequate, and that he had insisted on building fortifications along the entrance to the River Tagus to supplement the existing defences. To this end, he ordered the "making of a strong fort", but died before any plans were drawn. King Manuel I of Portugal revisited the proposal twenty years later and ordered the construction of a military fortification on the northern margin of the Tagus at Belém. In 1513, Lourenço Fernandes wrote a letter to his friends referring to the king's intention of constructing a tower near Restelo Velho, having determined it to be essential.

The presence of this military element was also a celebration of the round trip of the Portuguese to India and a way of receiving the fleets that arrived at the mouth of the Tagus, glorifying the feat, as if it were a mimetic of what those who arrived could identify with what they had seen in the East. The best example is the carved rhinoceros, the result of an offer from an Indian ruler who offered it to King Dom Manuel. This Rhinoceros would be the same one that Albrecht Dürer would immortalize in his drawings.

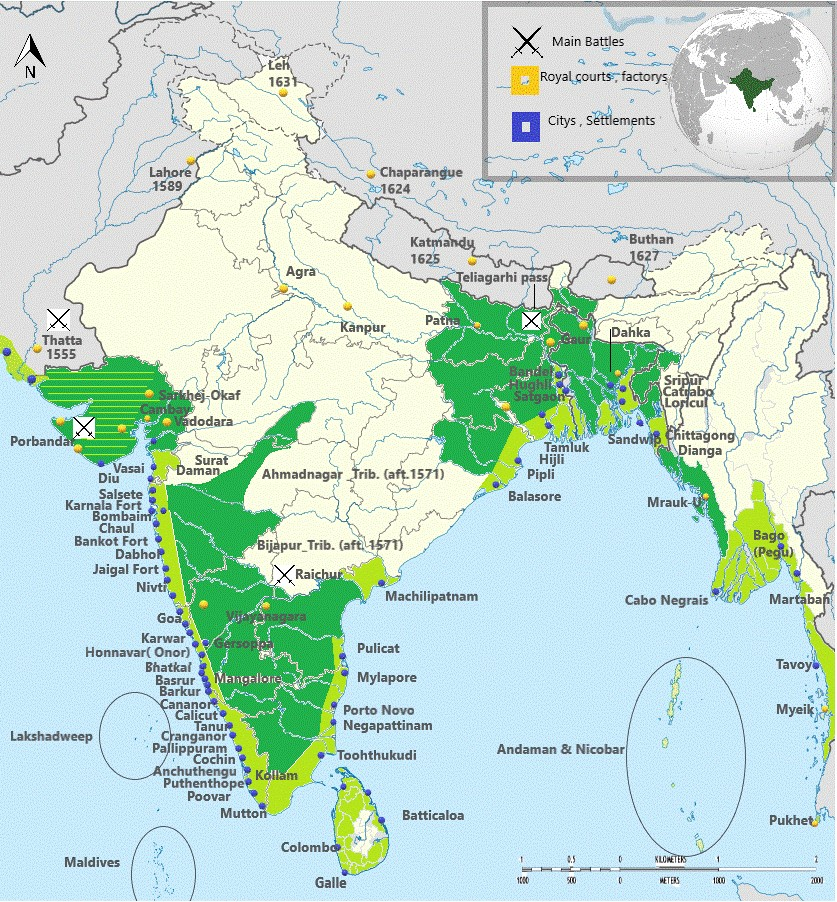
Portuguese presence in India, the Gulf of Bengal and the Himalayas (maximum extent) between the 15th and 17th centuries

The project was started on a basaltic rock outcrop a short distance from the riverbank, using some of the stone being collected to build the Monastery of Santa Maria de Belém. The tower was designed by military architect Francisco de Arruda, named "Master of the works of the Belém stronghold" by King Manuel, and in 1516 he began receiving 763 blocks and 504 stones for its construction, delivered by Diogo Rodrigues, treasurer for the project. As construction progressed, a man-of-war called the Grande Nau (Great Ship), a heavily armed, 1000–ton ship continued to guard the estuary at the mouth of the Tagus until the fort's completion.

The building was finished in 1519, just two years before Manuel's death, and Gaspar de Paiva was temporarily stationed to command the fortress; his commission was made permanent on 15 September 1521, when he was appointed the first Captain-General, or alcalde, and the fortress was named the Castle of St Vincent (Castelo de São Vicente de Belém), in honour of the patron saint of Lisbon.

In 1571, Francisco de Holanda advised the monarch that it was necessary to improve the coastal defences in order to protect the kingdom's capital. He suggested the construction of a "strong and impregnable" fort that could easily defend Lisbon and that the Belém Tower "should be strengthened, repaired and completed...that it has cost so much without being completed". D'Holanda designed an improved rectangular bastion with several turrets. In 1580, after a few hours of battle, the garrison stationed in the tower surrendered to Spanish forces under the command of the Duke of Alba. After this defeat, the dungeons of the tower served as a prison until 1830. It was also during the last quarter of the 16th century that the construction of the Philippine Barracks began. A rectangular two-storey space was constructed over the bastion, giving the tower the visual profile that it has retained to the present, with sculpted crosses of the Order of Christ and domed turrets.

In 1589, Philip I of Portugal ordered Italian engineer Friar João Vicenzio Casale to build a well-defended fort to be constructed in place of the "useless castle of São Vicente". The engineer submitted three designs, proposing that the bastion would be surrounded by another bastion of greater dimensions, but the project never materialized.

A 1633 codex for the House of Cadaval was inserted into one of the floors, in one of the arches of the barracks, and in the four largest arches at the top of the southern façade. Similarly, a reference to the year 1655 was inscribed on a plaque placed on the northern wall of the cloister, which certified the tower's function as a customs control point and for navigation along the Tagus; vessels were obliged to pay a tax as they entered the harbour, which was imposed incrementally.

Between 1780 and 1782, under the reign of Maria I of Portugal, General Guilherme de Valleré constructed the Fort of Bom Sucesso, whose battery was connected by a western corridor wall to the tower. When French forces invaded Lisbon during the Peninsular War, detachments of their troops were quartered in the tower from 1808 to 1814. After the French retreated, Lord Beresford advised that coastal artillery batteries should be reinforced along the Tagus, and specifically noted that stronger batteries should be placed on the sides of the tower's bastion, with carts placed to better protect the soldiers, since the walls were very low.

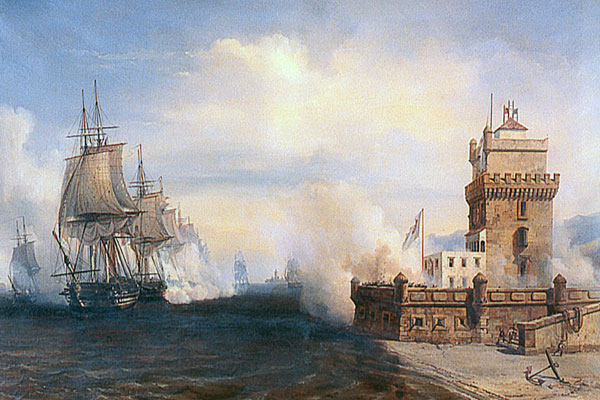
French ships exchanging fire with the tower during the Battle of the Tagus of the Liberal Wars

King Miguel I (1828–1834) used the dungeons to imprison his liberal opponents, while another level was used as a custom house for ships until the duty on foreign ships was abolished in 1833. The tower received military upgrades in 1589 and 1809–1814.

During the reign of Maria II, Almeida Garrett protested the site's degradation and under the persuasion of the Duke of Terceira, renovations were begun by military engineer António de Azevedo e Cunha. He demolished the Philippine barracks and extended revivalist elements in 1845–46 (such as the armoured merlons, the balustrade of the veranda along the southern façade, the laced fascia in the cloister and the niche with an image of the Virgin and Child).

In 1865–67 a beacon was installed on the southeast terrace of the building and a telegraph service was started, while nearby a gas factory was built, producing smoke that prompted many protests. The first moves to preserve and rehabilitate the tower began in the latter part of the 20th century. First, the tower was transferred to the Ministry of Finance in 1940, which undertook small conservation works. Then the military quarters on the battlements were removed and the inner cloister was built. The architectural landscape designer António Viana Barreto began a three-year project in 1953 to integrate the tower with the local shoreline. In 1983 the site hosted the 17th European Exhibition on Art, Science and Culture, and various projects involving the building were undertaken, among them covering the cloister with a transparent plastic cupola. In the same year, the Belém Tower was classified by UNESCO as a World Heritage Site.

In the 1990s, the property was transferred to the Instituto Português do Património Arquitectónico (forerunner of IGESPAR), which began a full restoration of the building that lasted from February 1997 to January 1998; this included reinforcing the tower and bastion, reinforcing the south balcony supports with stainless steel rods and epoxy resin, treating the mortar joints, and general structural cleaning. The statues of Saint Vincent of Saragossa and the Archangel Michael received the same treatment. In 1999 the project received the Europa Nostra award for its restoration of the exterior. The Belém Tower was added on 7 July 2007 to the registry of the Seven Wonders of Portugal.

== Architecture ==
The Belém Tower is situated on the northern bank of the Tagus River in the civil parish of Santa Maria de Belém, municipality of Lisbon, accessible at the western end of the Avenida de Brasília by a small bridge. Nearby are the Jeronimos Monastery to the east and the Forte do Bom Sucesso to the west, while to the north are the tower Governor's residence, the old Governor's residence for the Bom Successo fort, and the Chapel of São Jerónimo.

The tower is isolated along the riverbank, between the dock of Bom Sucesso and Pedrouços, on a basaltic outcropping of rocks belonging to the geomorphological volcanic complex of Lisboa-Mafra. Although various guides have claimed that the tower was built in the middle of the Tagus, and now sits near the shore after the 1755 earthquake redirected the river, they are incorrect. The Portuguese Ministry of Culture and the Institute of Architectural Heritage indicate that the tower was constructed on a small island near the bank of the Tagus, opposite the shore of Restelo. As development extended the shoreline progressively, more and more of the northern bank crept southwards into the Tagus, the tower becoming integrated into the riverbank over time.

The Belém Tower was built from a beige-white limestone local to the Lisbon area and thereabouts called Lioz. The building is divided into two parts: the bastion and the four-story tower located on the north side of the bastion.

The 16th-century tower is considered one of the principal works of the Portuguese Late Gothic Manueline style. This is especially apparent in its elaborate rib vaulting, crosses of the Order of Christ, armillary spheres and twisted rope, common to the nautically inspired organic Manueline style.

=== Exterior ===
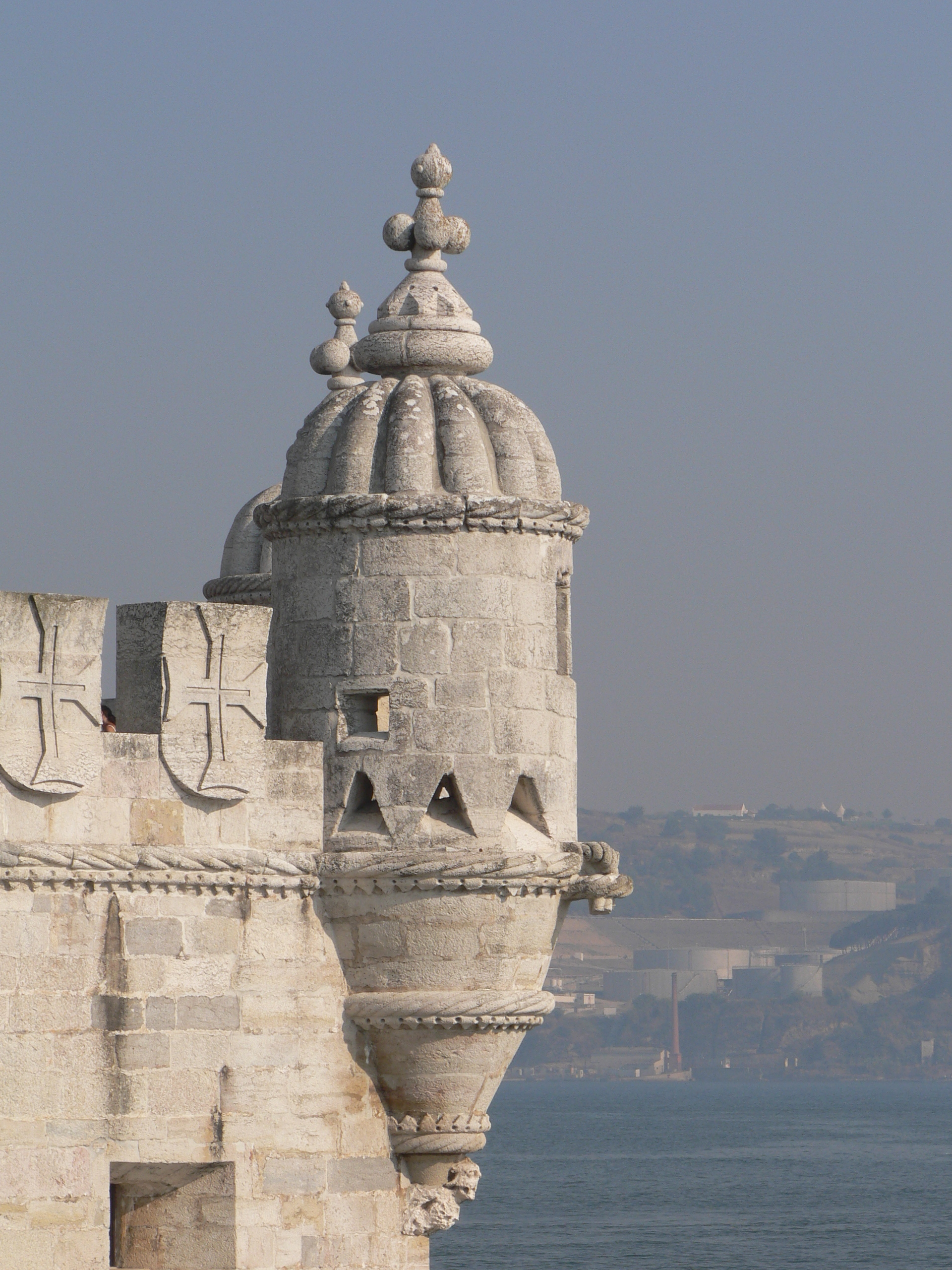
Bastion terrace with its Moorish bartizan turrets and cupolas from the northwest.

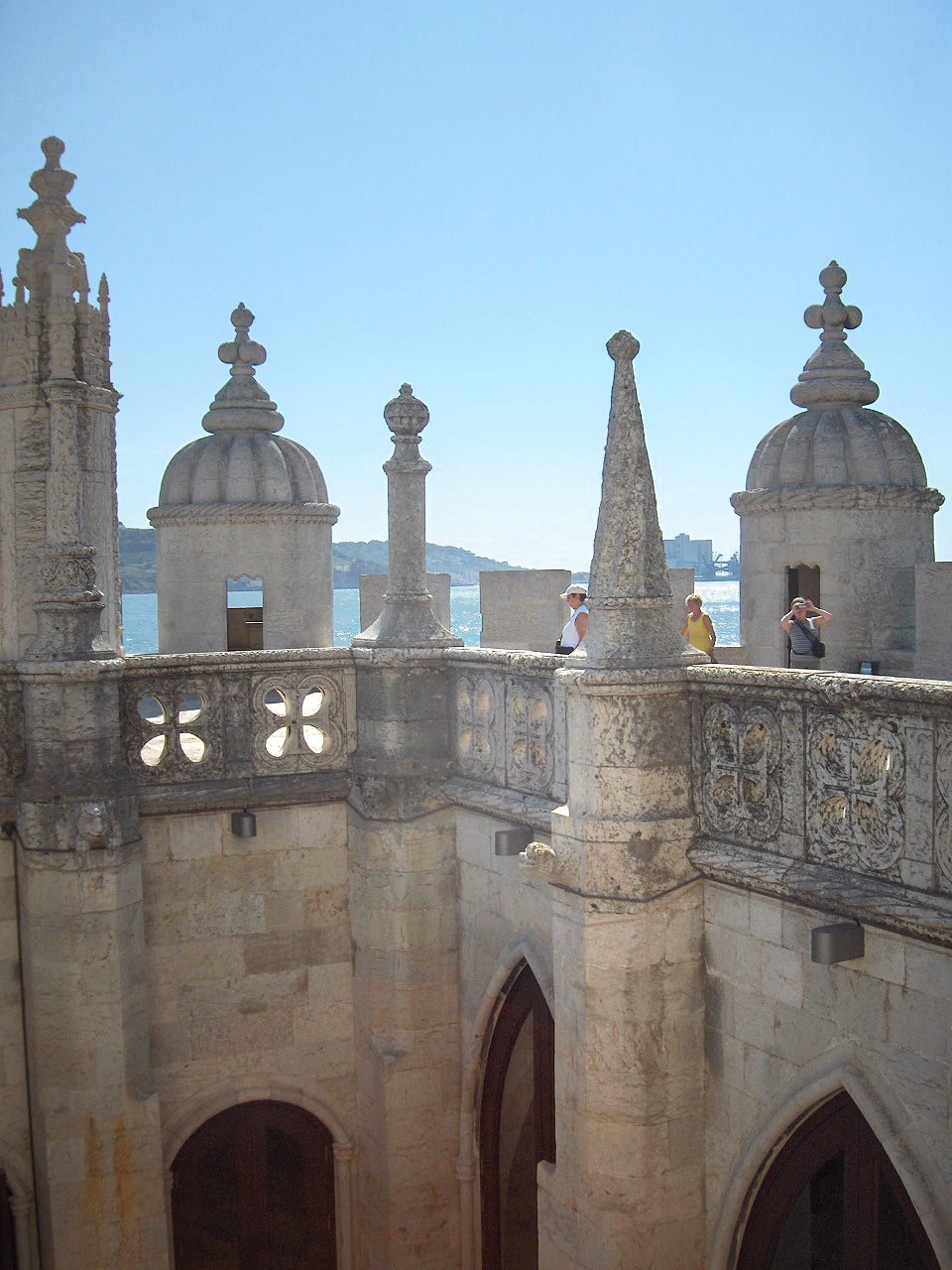
The inner cloister of the tower displaying the back side of the niche of the virgin and two turrets

The building's plan consists of a rectangular tower and an irregular, hexagonal bastion, with elongated flanks, that projects south into the river. It is basically a large articulated vertical space resting on a horizontal stone slab, covered by masonry enclosures. On the northeast angle of the structure, protected by a defensive wall with bartizans, is a drawbridge to access the bulwark, decorated in plant motifs, surmounted by the royal coat of arms and flanked by small columns, complemented with armillary spheres. The Manueline armillary spheres appear at the tower's entrance, symbolizing Portugal's nautical explorations, and were used on King Manuel I's personal banner to represent Portuguese discoveries during his rule. The decorative carved, twisted rope and elegant knots also point to Portugal's nautical history and are common elements of the Manueline style.

On the outside of the lower bastion, the walls have spaces for 17 cannons with embrasures affording a view of the river. The upper tier of the bastion is crowned by a small wall with bartizans in strategic places, decorated by rounded shields with the cross of the Order of Christ encircling the platform. King Manuel I was a member of the Order of Christ, thus the cross of the Order of Christ is used numerous times on the parapets. These were a symbol of Manuel's military power, as the knights of the Order of Christ participated in several military conquests in that era. The bartizans, cylindrical turrets (guerites) in the corners that served as watchtowers, have corbels with zoomorphic ornaments and domes covered with ridges unusual in European architecture, topped with ornate finials. The bases of the turrets have images of beasts, including a rhinoceros. This rhinoceros is considered to be the first sculpture of such an animal in Western European art and probably depicts the rhinoceros that Manuel I sent to Pope Leo X in 1515.

While the tower is predominantly Manueline in style, it also incorporates features of other architectural styles. It was built by the military architect Francisco de Arruda, who had already supervised the construction of several fortresses in Portuguese territories in Morocco. The influence of Moorish architecture is manifested in the delicate decorations, the arched windows, the balconies, and the ribbed cupolas of the watchtowers.

The tower has four storeys, with fenestrations and battlements, the ground floor being occupied by a vaulted cistern. On the first floor, there is a south-facing rectangular door with arched windows on the east and north, and bartizans in the northeast and northwest corners. The southern part of the second floor is dominated by a covered veranda with a loggia (matacães), consisting of an arcade of seven arches, resting on large corbels with balusters. It is covered by laced stonework to form a porch, and its sloped roof ends in a sculpted twisted rope. The eastern, northern and western walls are occupied by double-arched enclosures, with the northeast and northwest corners occupied by statues of Saint Vincent of Saragossa and the archangel Michael in niches. The third floor has twin windows in the northern, eastern and western façades, with balusters, interspersed by two armillary spheres and a large relief with the Royal coat of arms. The final floor is encircled by a terrace with shields of the Order of Christ, and a northern arched door and eastern arched window. The terrace is enclosed by a low wall with colonnaded pyramidal merlons with bartizans in the four corners. A similar terrace above this floor offers a view of the surrounding landscape.

=== Interior ===
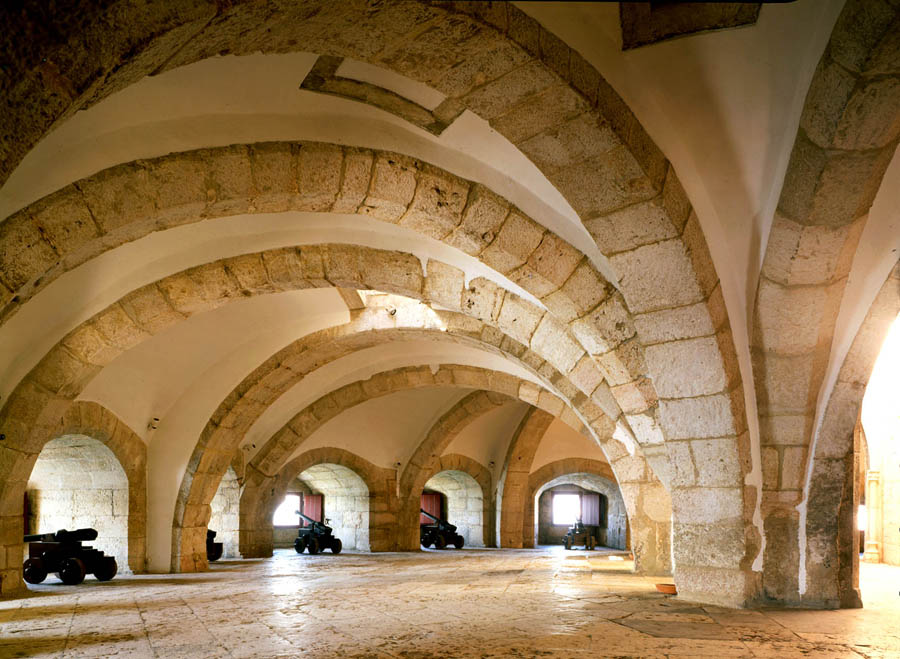
Interior casemate of the main bastion showing the cannon niches

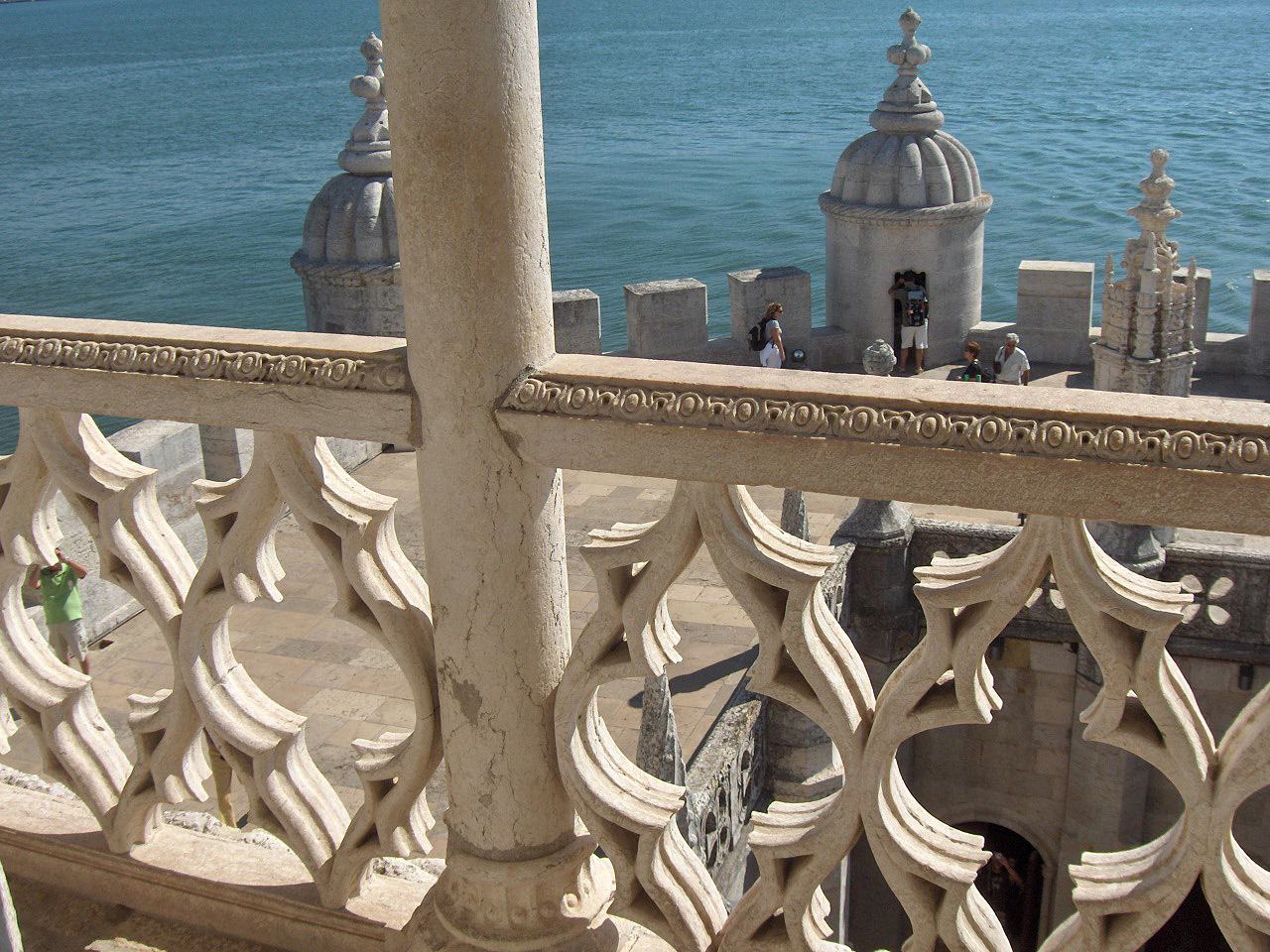
A view from the second floor loggia

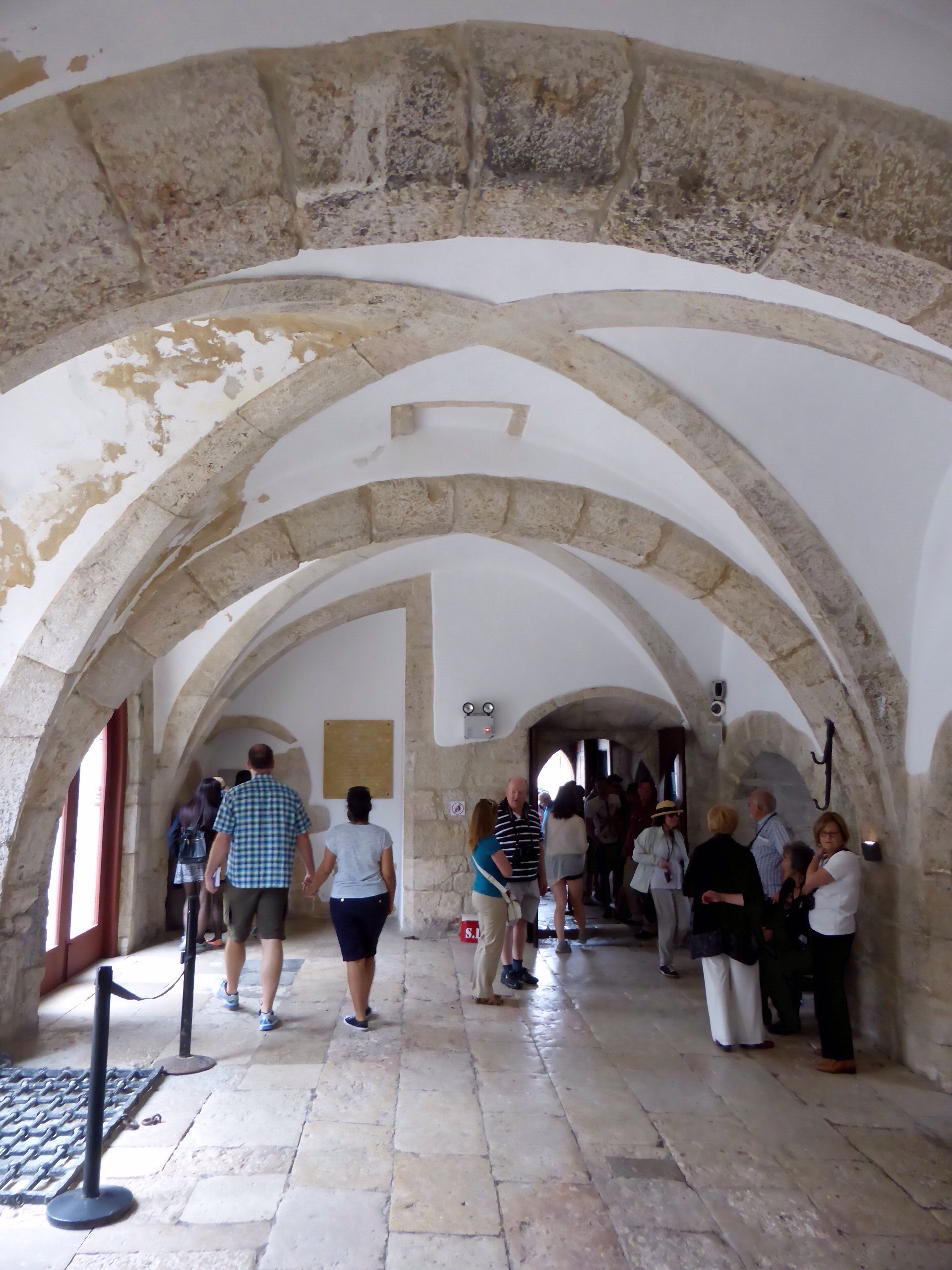
Tourists visiting inside

The interior of the bastion, with a circular staircase at the north end, has two contiguous halls with vaulted ceilings supported by masonry arches, as well as four storage lockers and sanitary facilities. On the ground floor bunker, the floor is inclined towards the outside, while the ceilings are supported by masonry pilasters and vaulted spines. Gothic rib vaulting is evident in this casemate, the rooms of the tower and the cupolas of the watchtowers on the bastion terrace. Peripheral compartments on the edges of the bunker allow the individual cannons to occupy their own space, with the ceiling designed with several asymmetrical domes of various heights. The ancillary storerooms were later used as prison cells.

Two archways open to the main cloister in the north and south, while six broken arches stretch along the eastern and western parts of the cloister, interspersed with square pillars in the bastion interior, with gargoyle facets. The open cloister above the casemate, although decorative, was designed to dispel cannon smoke. The upper level is connected by a railing decorated with crosses of the Order of Christ, while at the terrace the space has rising columns topped with armillary spheres. This space could also be used for light-calibre infantry. This was the first Portuguese fortification with a two-level gun emplacement and marked a new development in military architecture. Some of the decorations date from the renovation of the 1840s and are Neo-Manueline in style, like the decoration of the small cloister on the bastion.

On the southern portion of the cloister terrace is an image of the Virgin and Child. The statue of the Virgin of Belém also referred to as Nossa Senhora de Bom Successo (Our Lady of Good Success), Nossa Senhora das Uvas (Our Lady of the Grapes) or the Virgem da Boa Viagem (Virgin of Safe Homecoming) is depicted holding a child in her right hand and a bunch of grapes in her left.

The chapel interior (view as a 360° interactive panorama)

The tower is about 12 metres (39 ft) wide and 30 metres (98 ft) tall. The first-floor interior contains the Sala do Governador (Governor's Hall), an octagonal space that opens into the cistern, while in the northeast and northwest corners are corridors that link to the bartizans. A small door provides access via a spiral staircase to the subsequent floors. On the second floor, the Sala dos Reis (King's Hall) opens to the loggia overlooking the river, while a small corner fireplace extends from this floor to the third-floor fireplace in the Sala das Audiências (Audience Hall). The ceilings of all three floors are covered in hollow concrete slabs. The fourth-floor chapel has a vaulted rib ceiling with niches emblematic of the Manueline style, supported by carved corbels.

== Sources ==
- Turner, J. (1996), Grove Dictionary of Art, Macmillan Publishers Ltd., ISBN 1-884446-00-0
- Hancock, Matthew (2003), The Rough Guide to Lisbon, London: Rough Guides Ltd., ISBN 1-85828-906-8
- Weimer, Alois; Weimer-Langer, Britta (2000), Portugal, Basingstoke, England: GeoCenter International Ltd., ISBN 3-8297-6110-4
- Holanda, Francisco de (1986) [1571], Da Fábrica que Falece à Cidade de Lisboa (in Portuguese), Lisbon
- Resende, Garcia de (1622), Crónica dos Valerosos e Insignes Feitos del Rei D. João II (in Portuguese), Lisbon, p. 115
- "A Torre de Belém", Serões (in Portuguese), Lisbon, 1909, pp. 419–426
- Santos, Reynaldo dos (1922), A Torre de Belém (in Portuguese), Coimbra, Portugal
- Silva, Augusto Vieira da (1928), "Torre de Belém, Projectos de Remodelação no séc. XVI", Revista de Arqueologia e História (in Portuguese), vol. 6, Lisbon
- Sanches, José Dias (1929), Apontamentos e Croquis à Pena Sobre o Mosteiro dos Jerónimos e Torre de Belém (in Portuguese), Lisbon
- Sanches, José Dias (1940), Belém e Arredores Através dos Tempos (in Portuguese), Lisbon
- Costa, Américo (1932), "Torre de Belém", Dicionário Corográfico de Portugal Continental e Insular, vol. 3, Lisbon
- Nunes, J. de Sousa (1932), A Torre de S. Vicente a Par de Belém (in Portuguese), Lisbon
- Nunes, J. de Sousa (1959), A Torre de Belém (in Portuguese), Lisbon
- Araújo, Norberto de (1944), Inventário de Lisboa (in Portuguese) (fasc. 1 ed.), Lisbon
- Chicó, Mário Tavares (1948), A Arquitectura em Portugal na Época de D. Manuel e nos Princípios do Reinado de D. João III: O Gótico Final Português, o Estilo Manuelino e a Introdução da Arte do Renascimento (in Portuguese), Porto, Portugal
- Ribeiro, Mário de Sampaio Ribeiro (1954), A Torre e a Fortaleza de Belém, Separata dos Anais (in Portuguese), Lisbon
- Ministério das Obras Públicas, ed. (1960), Relatório da Actividade do Ministério nos Anos de 1959 (in Portuguese), vol. 1, Lisbon
- Gonçalves, A. Nogueira (1964), A Torre Baluarte de Belém, Sep. da Rev. Ocidente (in Portuguese), vol. 67, Lisbon
- Nunes, António Lopes Pires (1984), "As Fortalezas de Transição nos Cartógrafos do séc. XVI", Livro do Congresso. Segundo Congresso sobre Monumentos Militares Portugueses (in Portuguese), Lisbon, pp. 54–66
- Dias, Pedro (1986), Os Antecedentes da Arquitectura Manuelina in História da Arte em Portugal (in Portuguese), vol. 5, Lisbon, pp. 9–91
- Dias, Pedro (1988), A Arquitectura Manuelina (in Portuguese), Porto, Portugal
- Néu, João B. M. (1994), Em Volta da Torre de Belém. Evolução da Zona Ocidental de Lisboa (in Portuguese), Lisbon
- Moreira, Rafael (1994), "Torre de Belém", O Livro de Lisboa (in Portuguese), Lisbon
- IPPAR, ed. (2000), Torre de Belém, Intervenção de Conservação Exterior (in Portuguese), Lisbon
- Aires-barros, Luís (April 2001), As Rochas dos Monumentos Portugueses: Tipologias e Patologias (in Portuguese), vol. 2, Lisbon
