= World of wonder =

World of wonder(s) may refer to:

- World of Wonder (company), an independent television, film, and podcast production company
- World of Wonder (magazine), a UK children's magazine
- World of Wonders (novel), the third novel in Robertson Davies' Deptford Trilogy
- World of Wonder (anthology), a 1951 anthology of science fiction and fantasy stories edited by Fletcher Pratt
- World of Wonders (album), a 1986 album by Bruce Cockburn

Worlds of Wonder may refer to:

- Worlds of Wonder (amusement park), an amusement park in Noida, India
- Worlds of Wonder (game), a collection of three role-playing games
- Worlds of Wonder (toy company), a 1980s American toy company
- Worlds of Wonder (collection), a 1949 collection science fiction stories by Olaf Stapledon
- Worlds of Wonder: How to Write Science Fiction & Fantasy, a book by David Gerrold

== See also ==
- Wonders of the World (disambiguation)
