= Seven Natural Wonders of the UK =

List compiled by the Royal Geographical Society

The Seven Natural Wonders of the UK is a list compiled in May 2021 by the Royal Geographical Society. The seven wonders were chosen for their "shared beauty, uniqueness, and geological significance". There are four wonders in England (Wastwater, Dovedale, The Needles and the Jurassic Coast), one in Northern Ireland (Giant's Causeway), one in Scotland (Loch Coruisk & The Cuillins) and one in Wales (Pistyll Rhaeadr).

== Description ==
The list was compiled in May 2021 by the Royal Geographical Society in partnership with American outdoor clothing firm Merrell. It consists of what the compilers consider the most beautiful nature spots in the United Kingdom. The Royal Geographical Society's criteria for selecting the list were "shared beauty, uniqueness, and geological significance". The seven wonders selected include four from England (Wastwater, Dovedale, The Needles and the Jurassic Coast), one from Northern Ireland (Giant's Causeway), one from Scotland (Loch Coruisk & The Cuillins) and one from Wales (Pistyll Rhaeadr). Pistyll Rhaeadr has, since the 18th century, been considered one of the Seven Wonders of Wales.

A survey carried out by Merrell found that 41% of British adults had not visited a single one of the seven natural wonders. The Jurassic Coast was the most visited, with 31% of those surveyed reporting having travelled there, while Pistyll Rhaeadr was the least visited, with only 6% of those surveyed stating that had made a trip there. The survey found that only 10% of Britons had heard of all seven of the natural wonders.

The list was compiled following the COVID-19 pandemic which greatly restricted the ability of British people to travel and the compilers of the list hoped that it would inspire more travel to the locations selected.

== List ==
Locations of the Seven Natural Wonders of the United Kingdom.

Natural Wonder	Image	Location	Description	Ref
Dovedale		Peak District, England	Part of the Dove Valley featuring limestone ravines and fossilised marine life	
Giant's Causeway		County Antrim, Northern Ireland	Collection of 40,000 regular polygonal basalt columns formed by rapidly cooling lava. Also a UNESCO World Heritage Site	
Jurassic Coast		Devon & Dorset, England	95-mile (153 km) long stretch of coast containing fossils from the Mesozoic era. Also a UNESCO World Heritage Site	
Loch Coruisk & The Cuillins		Isle of Skye, Scotland	Freshwater loch in the centre of the island, surrounded by the Black Cuillins mountains.	
Pistyll Rhaeadr		Powys, Wales	240-foot (73 m) tall waterfall, one of Britain's tallest, fed by streams from the Berwyn Mountains	
The Needles		Isle of Wight, England	A series of chalk stacks extending into the sea from the western end of the island	
Wastwater		Lake District, England	Glacial valley surrounded by some of the Lake District's tallest mountains	

== See also ==
- Seven Wonders of the World
- Seven Natural Wonders
- New 7 Wonders of Nature
