= Wonders of the World =

Subjective lists of features and structures

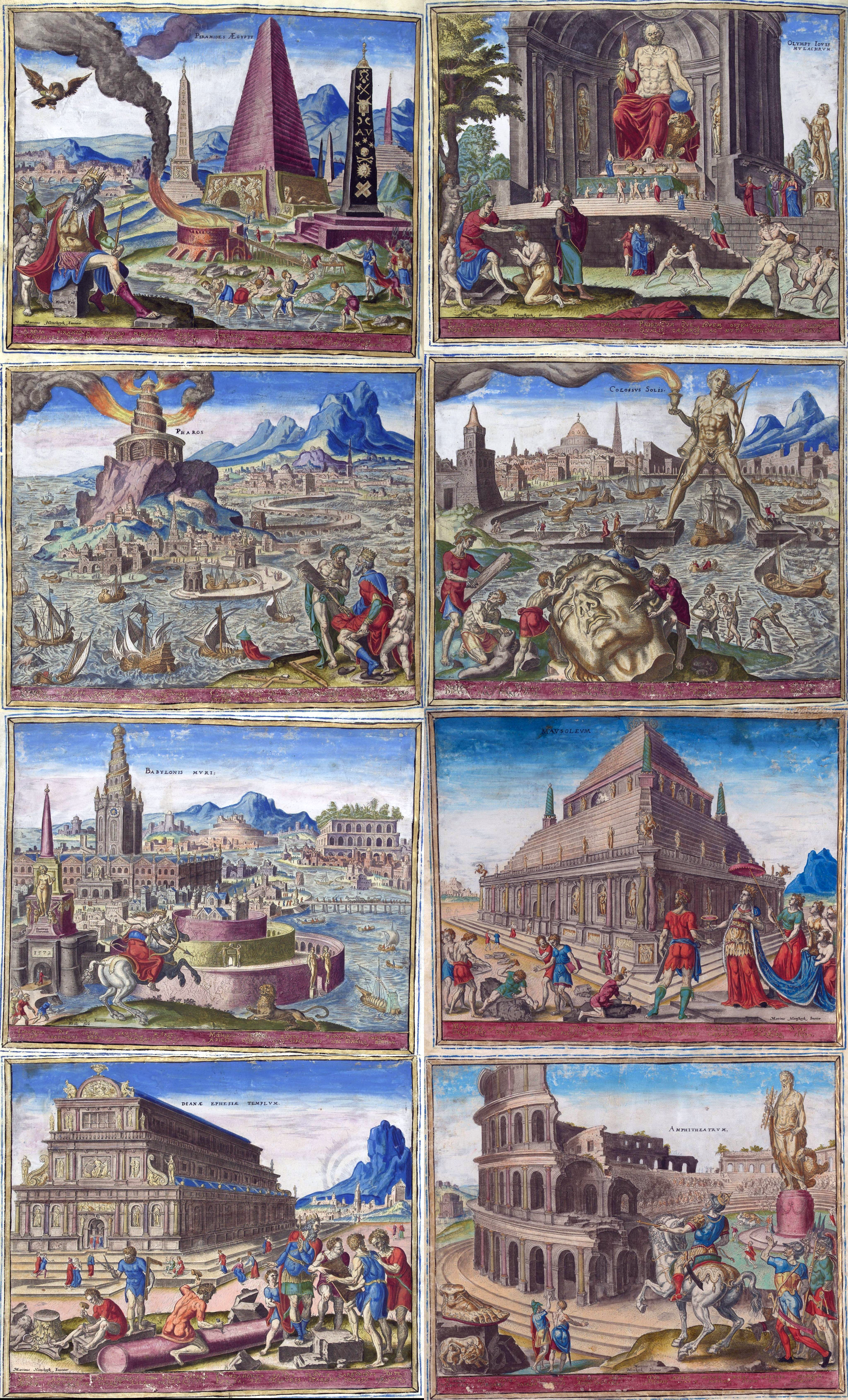
The Octo Mundi Miracula's imagined depictions of the Seven Wonders of the Ancient World, which established the modern canonical list of seven. From left to right, top to bottom: Great Pyramid of Giza, Statue of Zeus at Olympia, Lighthouse of Alexandria, Colossus of Rhodes, Hanging Gardens of Babylon, Mausoleum at Halicarnassus, and the Temple of Artemis. The author added the Colosseum as an eighth wonder.

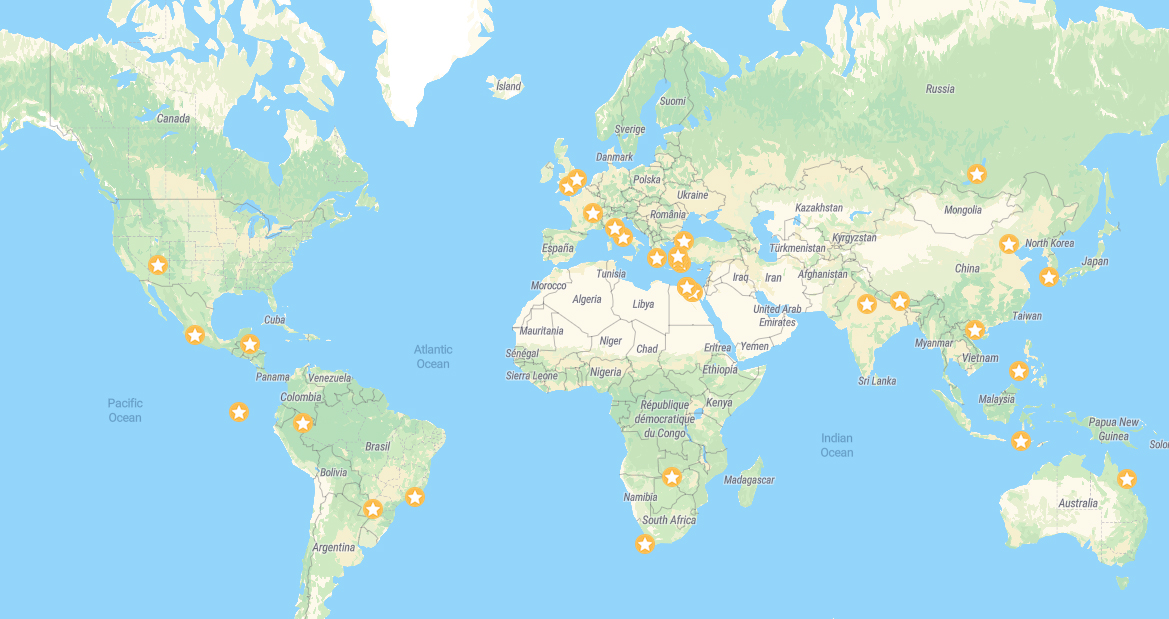
Map of places listed in various Wonders of the World lists

Various lists of the Wonders of the World have been compiled from antiquity to the present day, in order to catalogue the world's most spectacular natural features and human-built structures.

The Seven Wonders of the Ancient World is the oldest known list of this type, documenting the most iconic and remarkable human-made creations of classical antiquity; the canonical list was established in the 1572 Octo Mundi Miracula, based on classical sources which varied widely. The classical sources only include works located around the Mediterranean rim and in the ancient Near East. The number seven was chosen because the Greeks believed it represented perfection and plenty, and because it reflected the number of planets known in ancient times (five) plus the Sun and Moon.

== Seven Wonders of the Ancient World ==
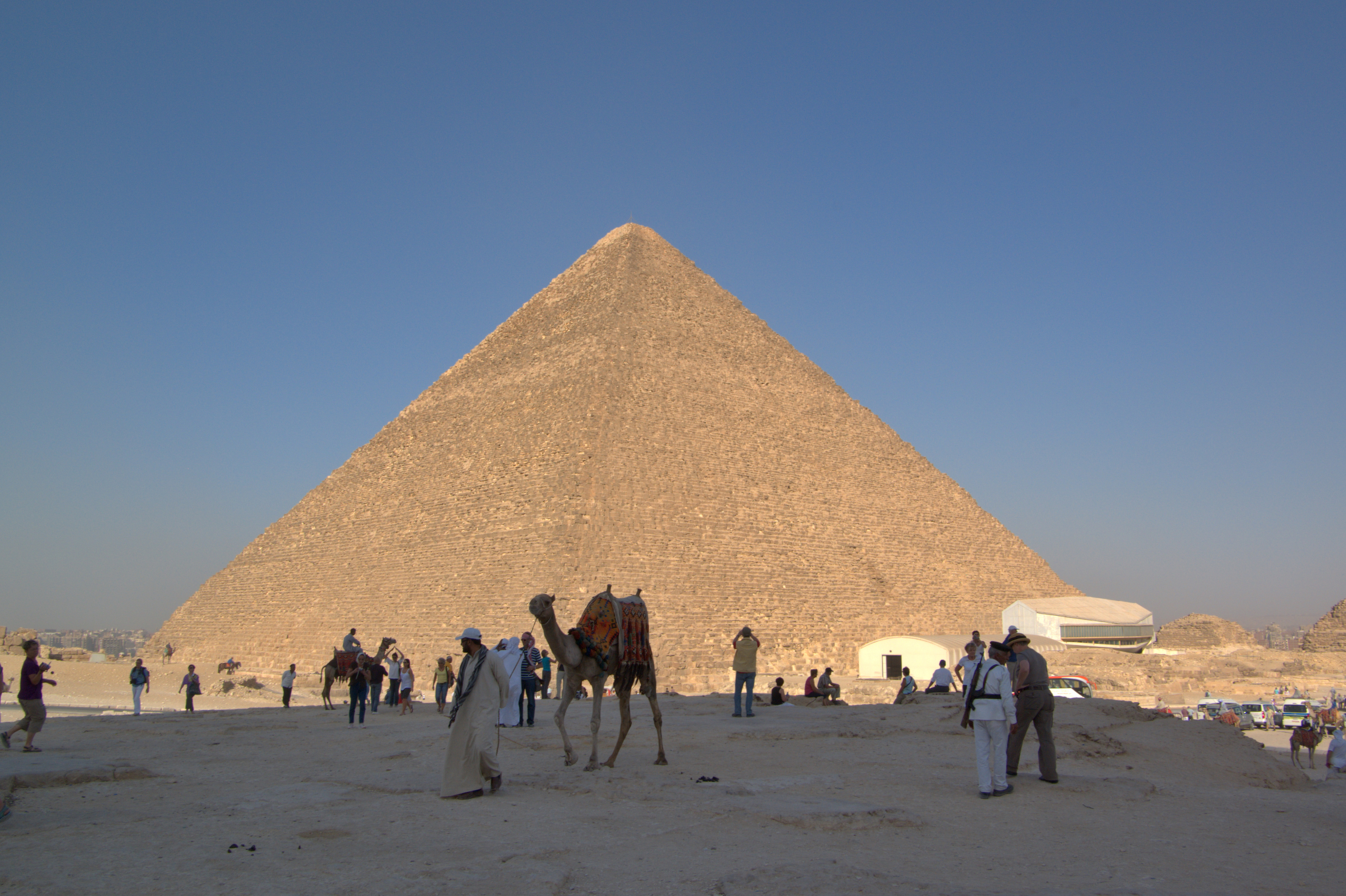
The Great Pyramid of Giza, the only wonder of the ancient world still in existence

The canonical Seven Wonders established in the 1572 Octo Mundi Miracula are:

- Great Pyramid of Giza, in Giza, Egypt, the earliest of the wonders to be completed, as well as the only one that remains to the modern day.
- Colossus of Rhodes, in the harbor of the city of Rhodes, on the Greek island of the same name.
- Hanging Gardens of Babylon, in Babylon, near modern Hillah, Babylon Governorate, Iraq; or Nineveh, Mosul, Nineveh Governorate, Iraq.
- Lighthouse of Alexandria, in Alexandria, Egypt.
- Mausoleum at Halicarnassus, in Halicarnassus, a city of the Achaemenid Empire in modern Turkey.
- Statue of Zeus at Olympia, in Olympia, Greece.
- Temple of Artemis at Ephesus, in the city of Ephesus, near modern Selçuk, Turkey.

== Lists from other eras ==
In the 19th and early 20th centuries, some writers emulated the classical list by creating their own lists with names such as "Wonders of the Middle Ages", "Seven Wonders of the Middle Ages", "Seven Wonders of the Medieval Mind", and "Architectural Wonders of the Middle Ages". It is unlikely that any of these lists actually originated in the Middle Ages since the concept of a "Middle Age" did not become popular until at least the 16th century and the word "medieval" was not invented until the Enlightenment era. Brewer's Dictionary of Phrase and Fable refers to them as "later list[s]", suggesting the lists were created after the Middle Ages.

Many of the structures on these lists were built much earlier than the Middle Ages but were well known throughout the world. Typically representative of such lists are:

- Catacombs of Kom El Shoqafa, a 2nd-century funerary complex in Alexandria, Egypt.
- Colosseum, a 1st-century amphitheatre in the centre of the city of Rome, Italy.
- Great Wall of China, a series of defensive fortifications built across the historical northern borders of China, with some segments dating to as early as the 7th century BC.
- Hagia Sophia, a 6th-century cathedral and mosque in Istanbul, Turkey.
- Leaning Tower of Pisa, a 12th-century bell tower in Pisa, Italy.
- Porcelain Tower of Nanjing, a 15th-century pagoda on the south bank of the external Qinhuai River in Nanjing, China.
- Stonehenge, a Neolithic henge monument in Wiltshire, England dated to the 3rd millennium BC.

Other structures sometimes included on such lists include:

- Cairo Citadel, a 13th-century Islamic fortification in Cairo, Egypt.
- Cluny Abbey, a 10th-century Benedictine monastery in Cluny, Saône-et-Loire, France.
- Ely Cathedral, a (currently Anglican) cathedral originally built in the 11th century in Ely, Cambridgeshire, England.
- Khawarnaq, a palace constructed in the 5th century by the Lakhmid kingdom, from pre-Islamic Arabia
- The Fortifications of Derbent, a Sasanian defense line in Caucasus

== Recent lists ==
Following in the tradition of the classical list, modern people and organizations have made their own lists of wonderful things, both ancient and modern, natural and artificial. Some of the most notable lists are presented below.

=== American Society of Civil Engineers ===
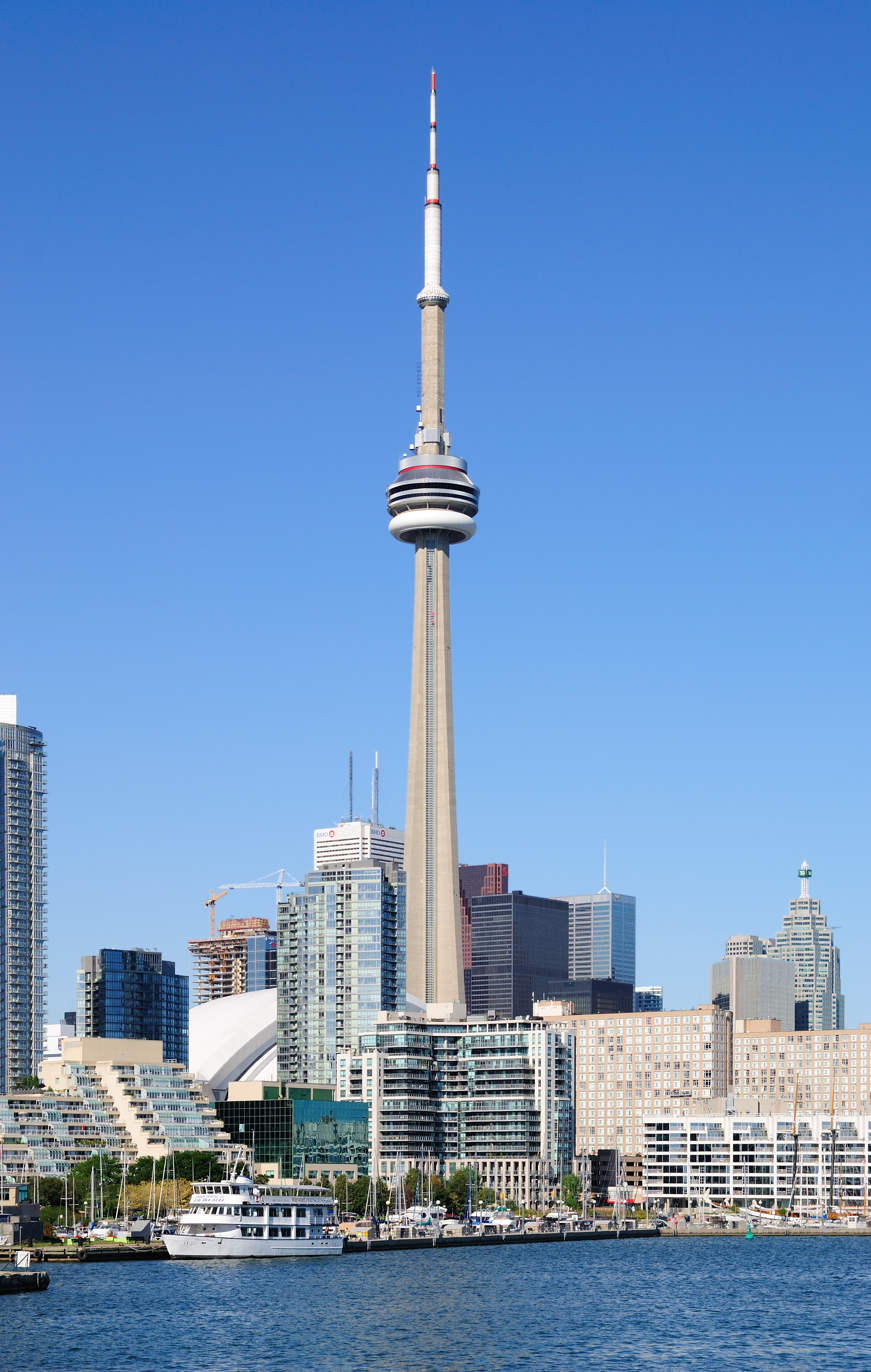
CN Tower in Toronto, Canada

In 1994, the American Society of Civil Engineers compiled a list of Seven Wonders of the Modern World, paying tribute to the "greatest civil engineering achievements of the 20th century".

American Society of Civil Engineers Wonders
Wonder	Date started	Date finished	Location	Significance
Channel Tunnel	December 1, 1987	May 6, 1994	Strait of Dover, in the English Channel between the United Kingdom and France	Longest undersea portion of any tunnel in the world
CN Tower	February 6, 1973	June 26, 1976	Toronto, Ontario, Canada	Tallest freestanding structure in the world from 1976 to 2007
Empire State Building	March 17, 1930	April 11, 1931	New York City, New York, United States	Tallest structure in the world from 1931 to 1954; tallest freestanding structure in the world from 1931 to 1967; tallest building in the world from 1931 to 1970; first building with 100+ stories
Golden Gate Bridge	January 5, 1933	May 27, 1937	Golden Gate Strait, north of San Francisco, California, United States	Longest main span of any suspension bridge in the world from 1937 to 1964
Itaipu Dam	January 1970	May 5, 1984	Paraná River, on the border between Brazil and Paraguay	Largest operating hydroelectric facility in the world in terms of annual energy generation
Netherlands North Sea Protection Works (Delta and Zuiderzee Works)	1920	May 10, 1997	Zeeland, South Holland, North Holland, Friesland and Flevoland, Netherlands	Largest hydraulic engineering project undertaken by the Netherlands during the 20th century
Panama Canal	January 1, 1880	January 7, 1914	Isthmus of Panama	Allows passage of oceangoing vessels between the Atlantic and Pacific oceans; one of the largest and most difficult engineering projects ever undertaken

=== USA Today's New Seven Wonders ===
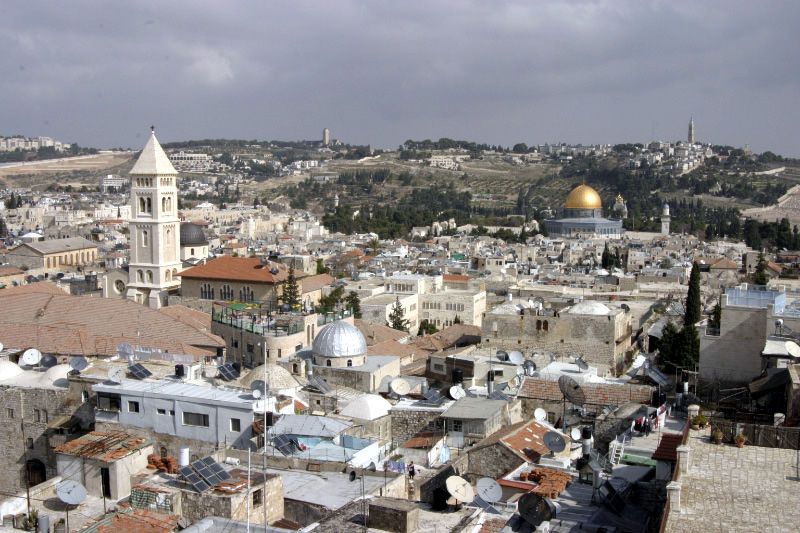
Old City of Jerusalem

In November 2006, the American national newspaper USA Today and the American television show Good Morning America revealed a list of the "New Seven Wonders", both natural and human-made, as chosen by six judges. The Grand Canyon was added as an eighth wonder on November 24, 2006, in response to viewer feedback.

USA Today's New Seven Wonders
Wonder	Location
Potala Palace	Lhasa, Tibet
Old City of Jerusalem	Israel (Note: Both the USA Today article and the Good Morning America broadcast described this wonder as "Jerusalem's Old City, Israel." The Old City is located in East Jerusalem, which is claimed by both the State of Israel and the State of Palestine. The UN and most countries do not recognize Israel's claim to East Jerusalem, taking the position that the final status of Jerusalem is pending future negotiations between Israel and the Palestinian Authority. See Positions on Jerusalem for more information.)
Polar ice caps	Earth's polar regions (Arctic and Antarctic)
Papahānaumokuākea Marine National Monument	Hawaii, United States
The Internet	Worldwide
Mayan ruins	Yucatán Peninsula, México
Great Migration of Serengeti and Masai Mara	Tanzania and Kenya
Grand Canyon (viewer-chosen eighth wonder)	Arizona, United States

=== Seven Natural Wonders of the World ===
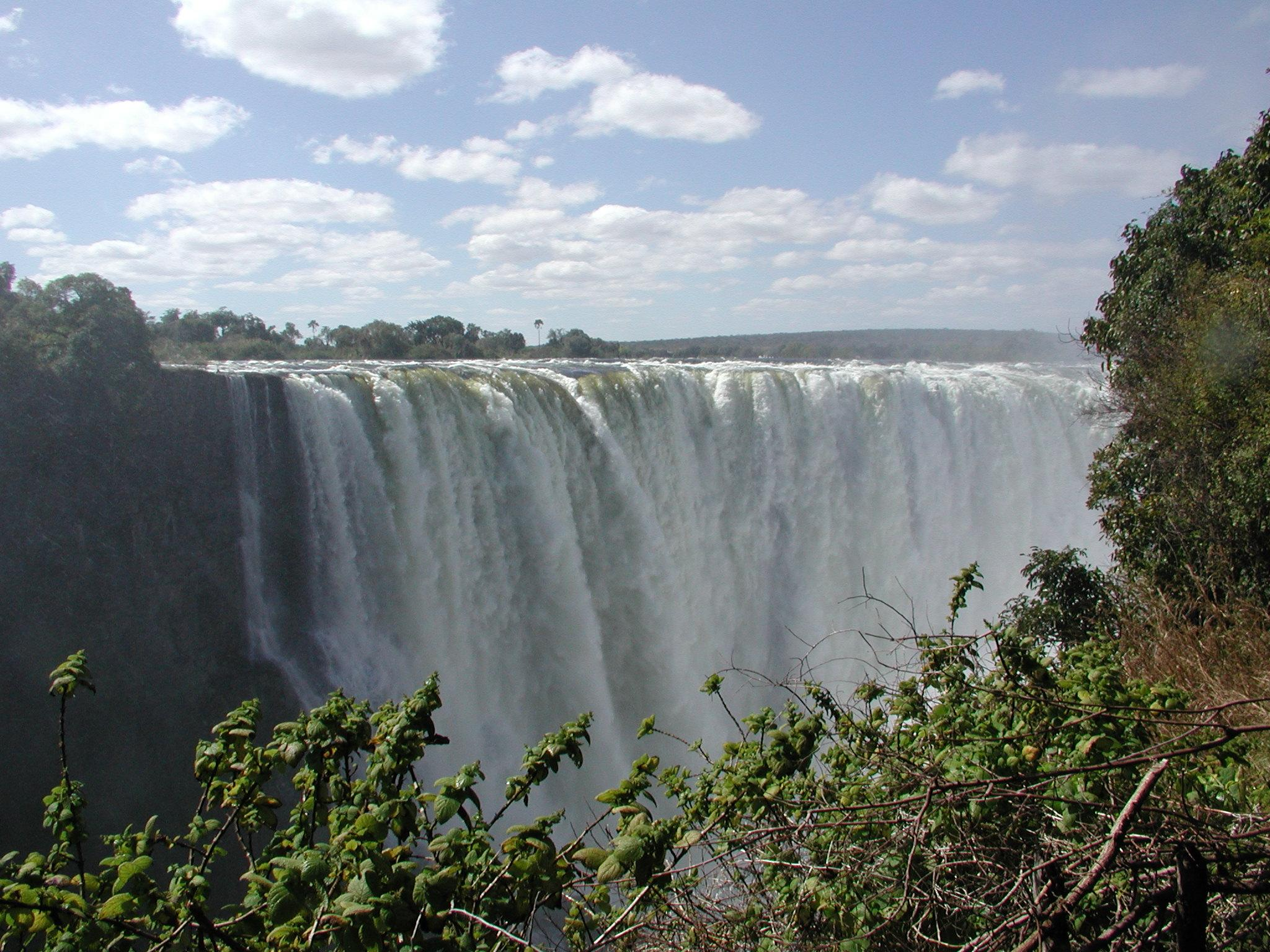
Victoria Falls

Similar to the other lists of wonders, there is no consensus on a list of seven natural wonders of the world. One of many existing versions of this list was compiled by CNN in 1997:

- Aurora, in the Earth's high-latitude regions (around the Arctic and Antarctic)
- Grand Canyon, in Arizona, United States
- Great Barrier Reef, off the coast of Queensland, Australia
- Harbor of Rio de Janeiro, Brazil
- Mount Everest, on the border of Nepal and China
- Parícutin volcano, located in the state of Michoacán, Mexico
- Victoria Falls, on the border of Zambia and Zimbabwe

=== New 7 Wonders of the World ===
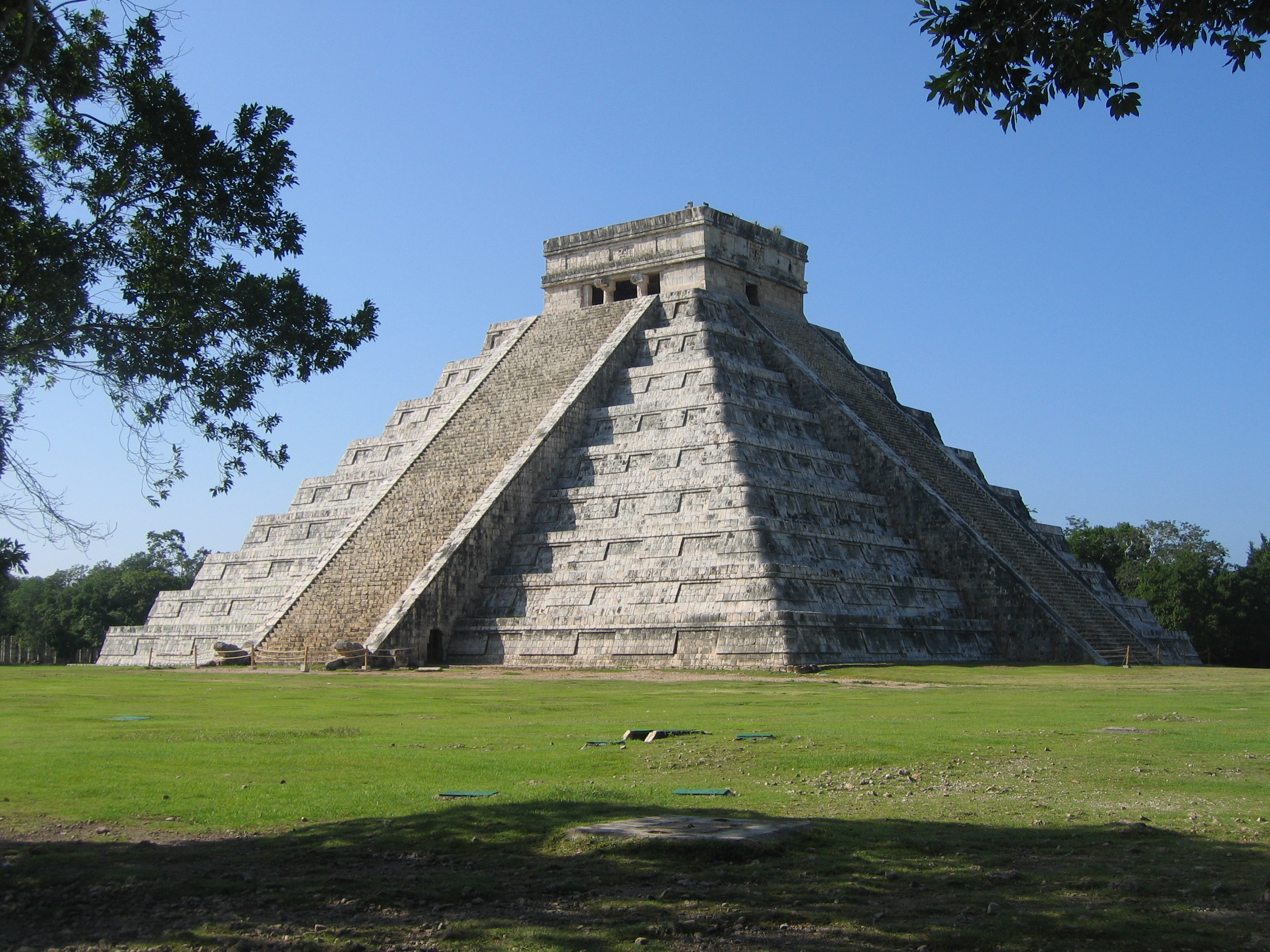
El Castillo at Chichen Itza

In 2001, an initiative was started by the Swiss corporation New7Wonders Foundation to choose the New 7 Wonders of the World from a selection of 200 existing monuments through online votes. The Great Pyramid of Giza, the only remaining wonder of the traditional Seven Wonders of the Ancient World, was not one of the winners announced in 2007 but was added as an honorary candidate.

Wonder	Date of construction	Present-day location
Great Wall of China	Since 7th century BC	China
Petra	c. 100 BC	Ma'an, Jordan
Christ the Redeemer	opened to the public October 12, 1931	Rio de Janeiro, Brazil
Machu Picchu	c. AD 1450	Urubamba Province, Peru
Chichen Itza	c. AD 600	Yucatán, Mexico
Colosseum	completed AD 80	Rome, Italy
Taj Mahal	completed c. AD 1648	Agra, India
Giza Pyramids (honorary candidates)	completed c. 2560 BC	Giza, Egypt

=== New 7 Wonders of Nature ===
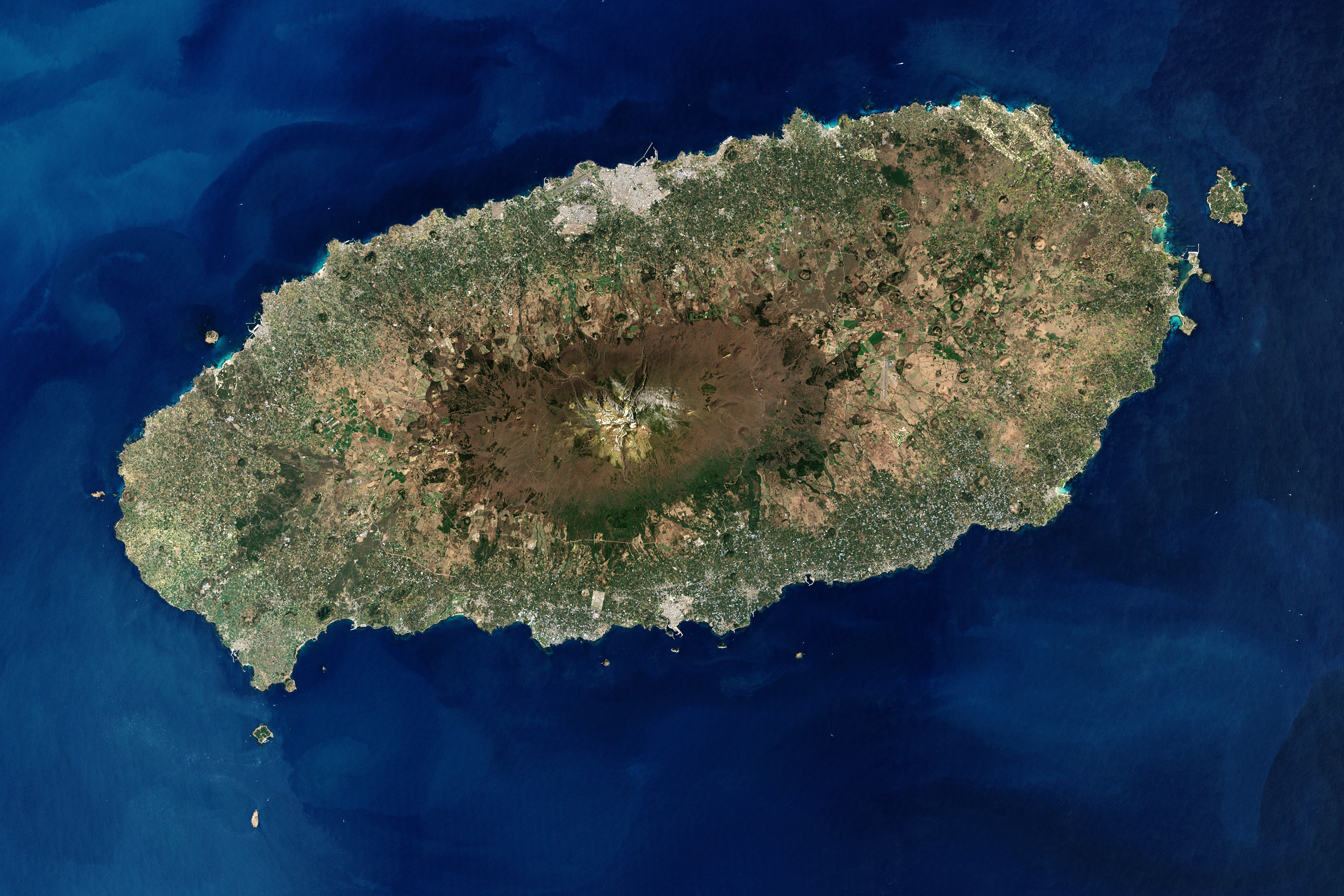
Jeju Island

A similar contemporary effort to create a list of seven natural (as opposed to human-made) wonders chosen through a global poll, called the New 7 Wonders of Nature, was organized from 2007 to 2011 by the same group as the New 7 Wonders of the World campaign.

- Iguazu Falls, on the border of the Argentine province of Misiones and the Brazilian state of Paraná
- Hạ Long Bay, in Quảng Ninh province, Vietnam
- Jeju Island, in the Jeju Province of South Korea
- Puerto Princesa Underground River, in Palawan, Philippines
- Table Mountain, overlooking the city of Cape Town, South Africa
- Komodo Island, one of the 17,508 islands that comprise the Republic of Indonesia
- Amazon rainforest, located in Brazil, Peru, Colombia, Venezuela, Ecuador, Bolivia, Guyana, Suriname, and French Guiana

=== New 7 Wonders Cities ===
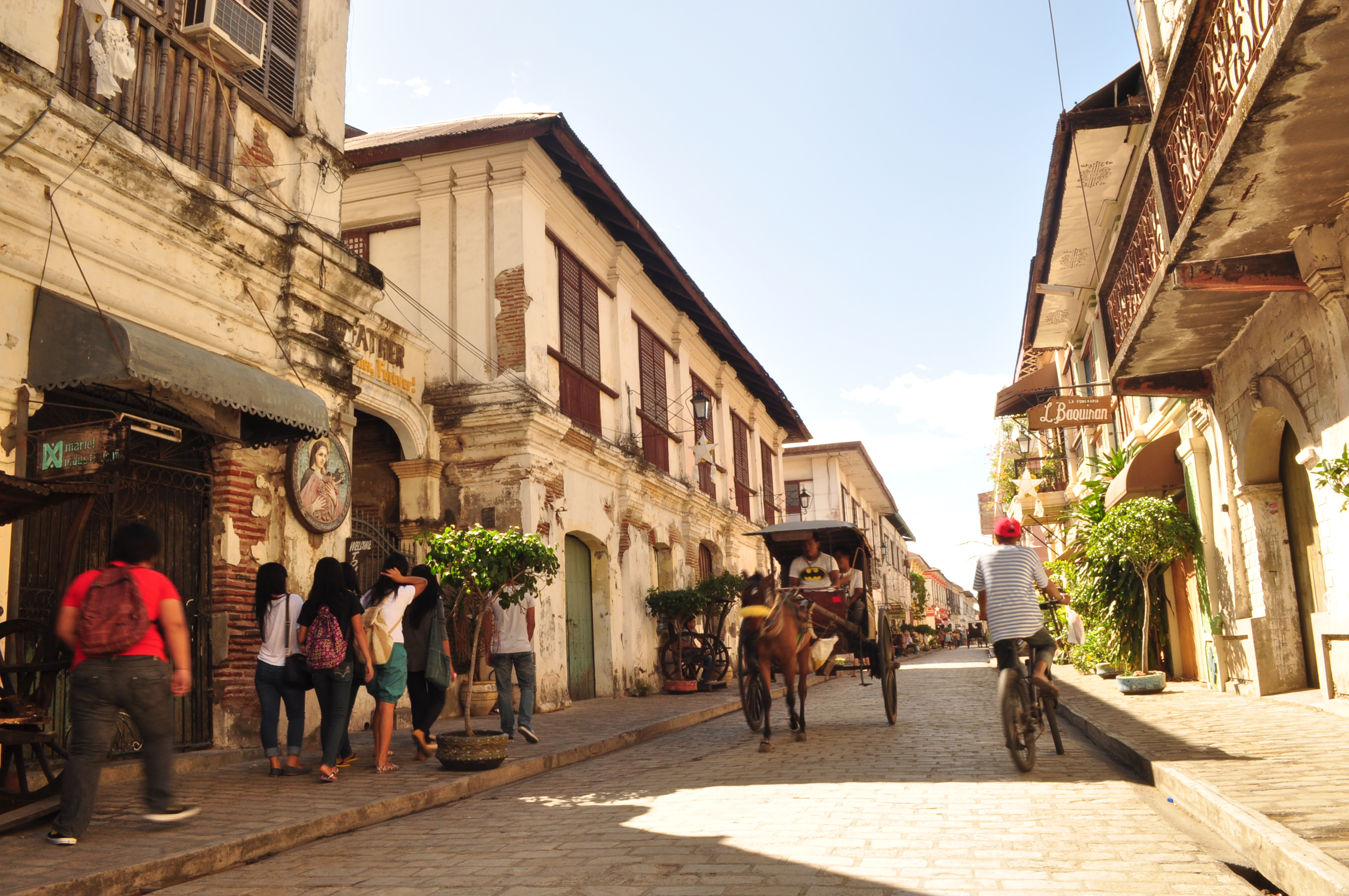
Calle Crisologo, Vigan City

New 7 Wonders Cities, a third list organized by New7Wonders and determined by another global vote, includes entire cities:

- Durban, South Africa
- Vigan, Philippines
- Havana, Cuba
- Kuala Lumpur, Malaysia
- Beirut, Lebanon
- Doha, Qatar
- La Paz, Bolivia

=== Seven Wonders of the Underwater World ===
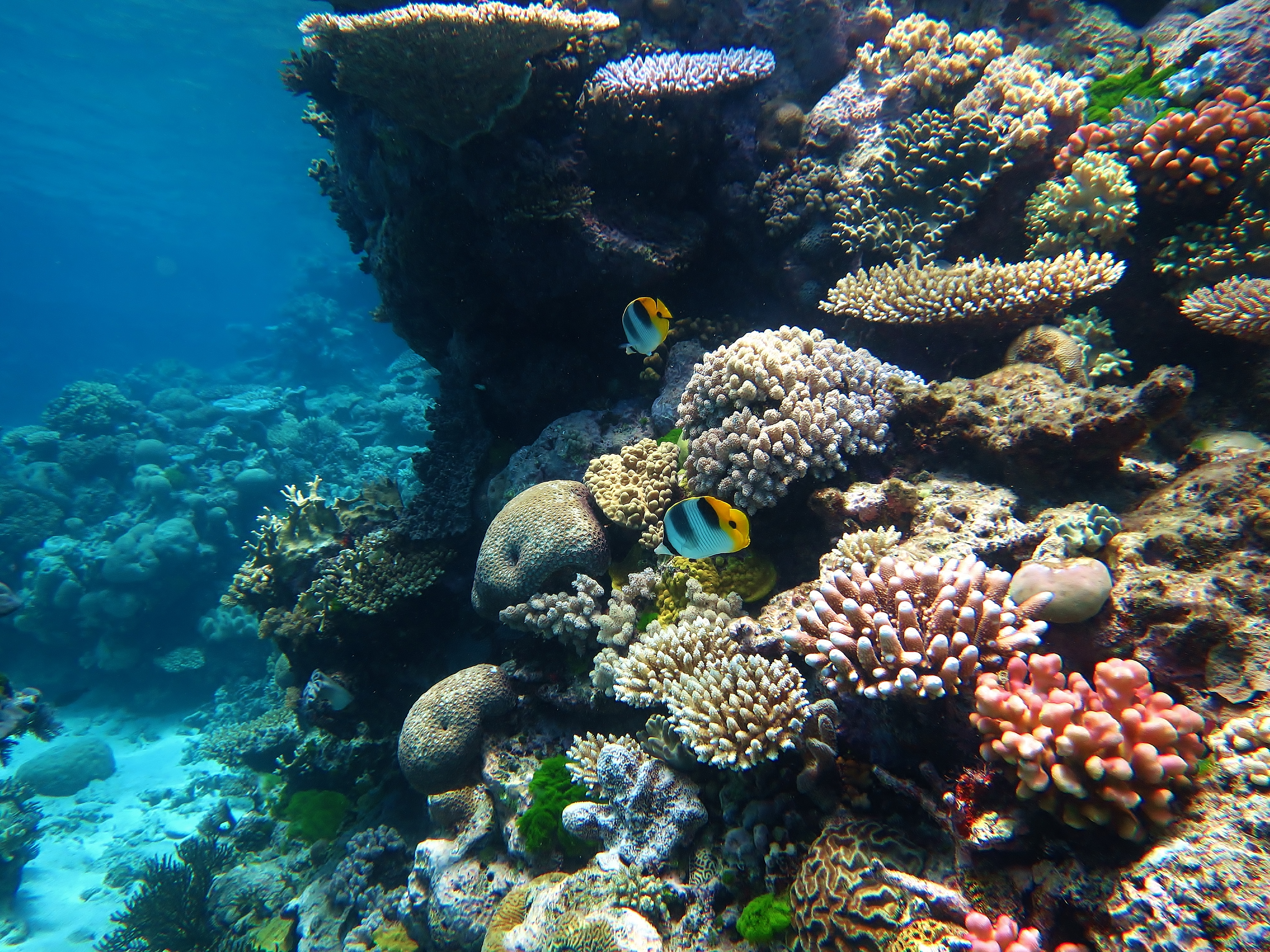
The Great Barrier Reef

The list of "Seven Wonders of the Underwater World" was drawn up by CEDAM International, an American-based non-profit group for divers that is dedicated to ocean preservation and research. In 1989, CEDAM brought together a panel of marine scientists, including Eugenie Clark, to choose underwater areas which they considered worthy of protection. The results were announced at The National Aquarium in Washington, D.C., by actor Lloyd Bridges, star of TV's Sea Hunt:

- Palau
- Belize Barrier Reef, Belize
- Great Barrier Reef, Australia
- Deep-sea hydrothermal vents (worldwide)
- Galápagos Islands, Ecuador
- Lake Baikal, Russia
- Northern Red Sea, bordered by Saudi Arabia and Yemen on the eastern shore, and Egypt, Sudan, Eritrea, and Djibouti on the western shore

=== Seven Wonders of the Industrial World ===
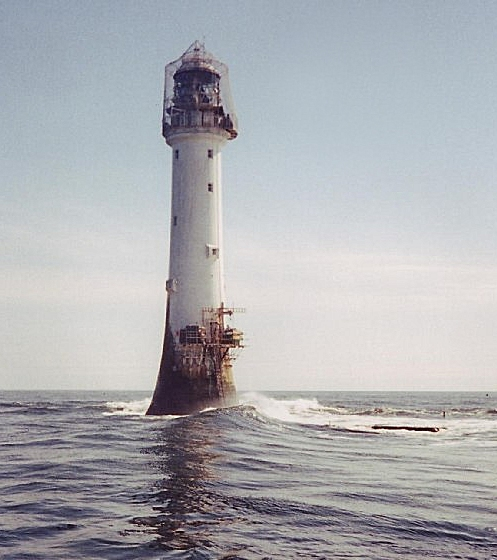
Bell Rock Lighthouse

British author Deborah Cadbury wrote Seven Wonders of the Industrial World, a book telling the stories of seven great feats of engineering of the 19th and early 20th centuries. In 2003, the BBC aired a seven-part docudrama exploring the same feats, with Cadbury as a producer.

Wonder	Description	Completed
SS Great Eastern	British oceangoing passenger steamship	1858
Bell Rock Lighthouse	In the North Sea off the coast of Angus, Scotland	1810
Brooklyn Bridge	In New York City, New York, United States	1883
London sewer system	Serving London, England	1870
First transcontinental railroad	1,912-mile (3,077 km) continuous railroad line connecting existing rail networks in Iowa, Nebraska, Wyoming, Utah, Nevada, and California in the United States	1869
Panama Canal	51-mile (82 km) artificial waterway crossing the Isthmus of Panama and connecting the Atlantic and Pacific oceans	1914
Hoover Dam	On the Colorado River, spanning the border between Nevada and Arizona in the United States	1936

=== Seven Wonders of the Solar System ===
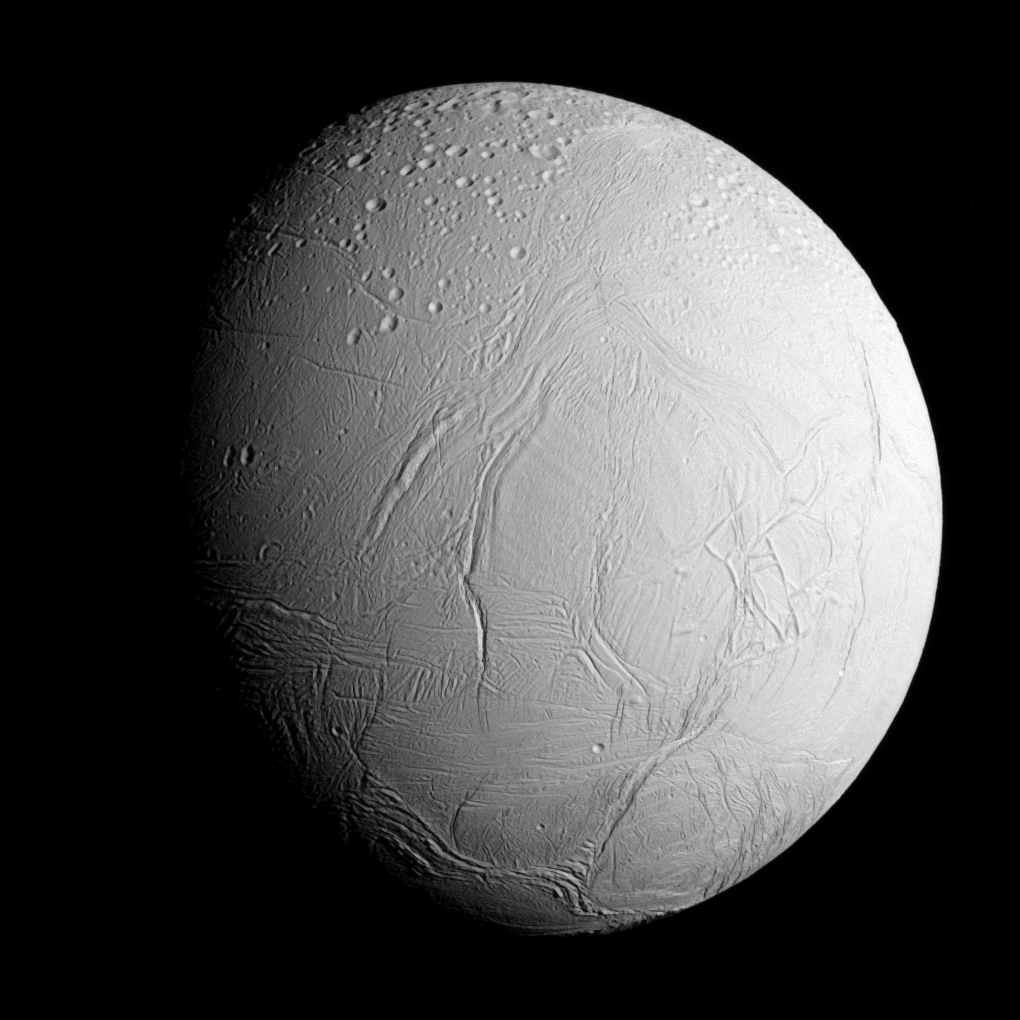
Enceladus

In a 1999 article, Astronomy magazine listed the "Seven Wonders of the Solar System". This article was later made into a video.

- Enceladus, a moon of Saturn
- The Great Red Spot of Jupiter, a massive and persistent anticyclonic storm in the planet's southern hemisphere
- The asteroid belt, a region of innumerable small solid bodies located between the orbits of Mars and Jupiter
- The surface of the Sun
- The oceans of Earth
- The Rings of Saturn
- Olympus Mons, an enormous shield volcano on Mars and the tallest planetary mountain in the Solar System

=== Other lists of wonders of the world ===
Many authors and organizations have composed lists of the wonders of the world that have been published in book or magazine form.

Seven Wonders of the World is a 1956 film in which Lowell Thomas searches the world for natural and artificial wonders and invites the audience to try to update the ancient Wonders of the World list.

Sometimes, either as a marketing technique or slogan, brands will adopt the title of Eighth Wonder of The World. This term is usually used to describe places or events or people that are purportedly equally as illusive in nature, such as André the Giant, a man known for his abnormal stature.

== See also ==
- National Seven Wonders
  - Seven Wonders of Brazil
  - Seven Wonders of Canada
  - Seven Wonders of Colombia
  - Seven Wonders of Poland
  - Seven Wonders of Portugal
  - Seven Natural Wonders of Romania
  - Seven Wonders of Romania
  - Seven Wonders of Russia
  - Seven Wonders of Ukraine
  - Seven Natural Wonders of the UK
  - Seven Wonders of Wales
  - Seven Wonders of Dauphiné
- Eight Views – the traditional East Asian term for a collection of significant points of interest in an area
- 12 Treasures of Spain
- Seven Wonders of Fore (Fore Abbey, Ireland)
- World Heritage List – a list of over 1,200 sites deemed by UNESCO to be of "outstanding universal value"
