= Seven Wonders of Portugal =

List of cultural wonders

Seven Wonders of Portugal

The Seven Wonders of Portugal (Portuguese: Sete Maravilhas de Portugal) is a list of cultural wonders located in Portugal. The creation of the list was supported by the Ministry of Culture and organized by the companies Y&R Brands S.A. and Realizar S.A.

Initially 793 national monuments of Portugal were listed by Instituto Português do Património Arquitectónico (IPPAR) as candidates, however in the first round of selections a board of experts reduced the number to 77. The contenders were further reduced to 21 finalist in four different categories by Conselho de Notáveis at the University of Évora.

The six-month-long public elections started on 7 December 2006 to select the top seven wonders. Votes could be cast via internet, telephone and SMS. Results of the vote were announced on 7 July 2007 at the Estádio da Luz in Lisbon, as were the results of the global New Seven Wonders of the World contest.

== Seven Wonders of Portugal ==
#	Name	Location	Image
1	Castle of Guimarães, 10th century	Guimarães, Minho; 41.4479°N 8.2906°W	
2	Castle of Óbidos, 1195	Óbidos, Estremadura; 39°21.819′N 9°09.428′W	
3	Batalha Monastery, 1385	Batalha, Beira Litoral; 39.659167°N 8.826111°W	
4	Alcobaça Monastery, 1153	Alcobaça, Estremadura; 39.548333°N 8.98°W	
5	Jerónimos Monastery, 1502	Santa Maria de Belém, Lisbon, Estremadura; 38.6975°N 9.206667°W	
6	Pena Palace, 1854	Sintra, Lisbon, Estremadura; 38.787778°N 9.390556°W	
7	Belém Tower, 1521	Santa Maria de Belém, Lisbon, Estremadura; 38.691389°N 9.215833°W	

== Other finalists ==
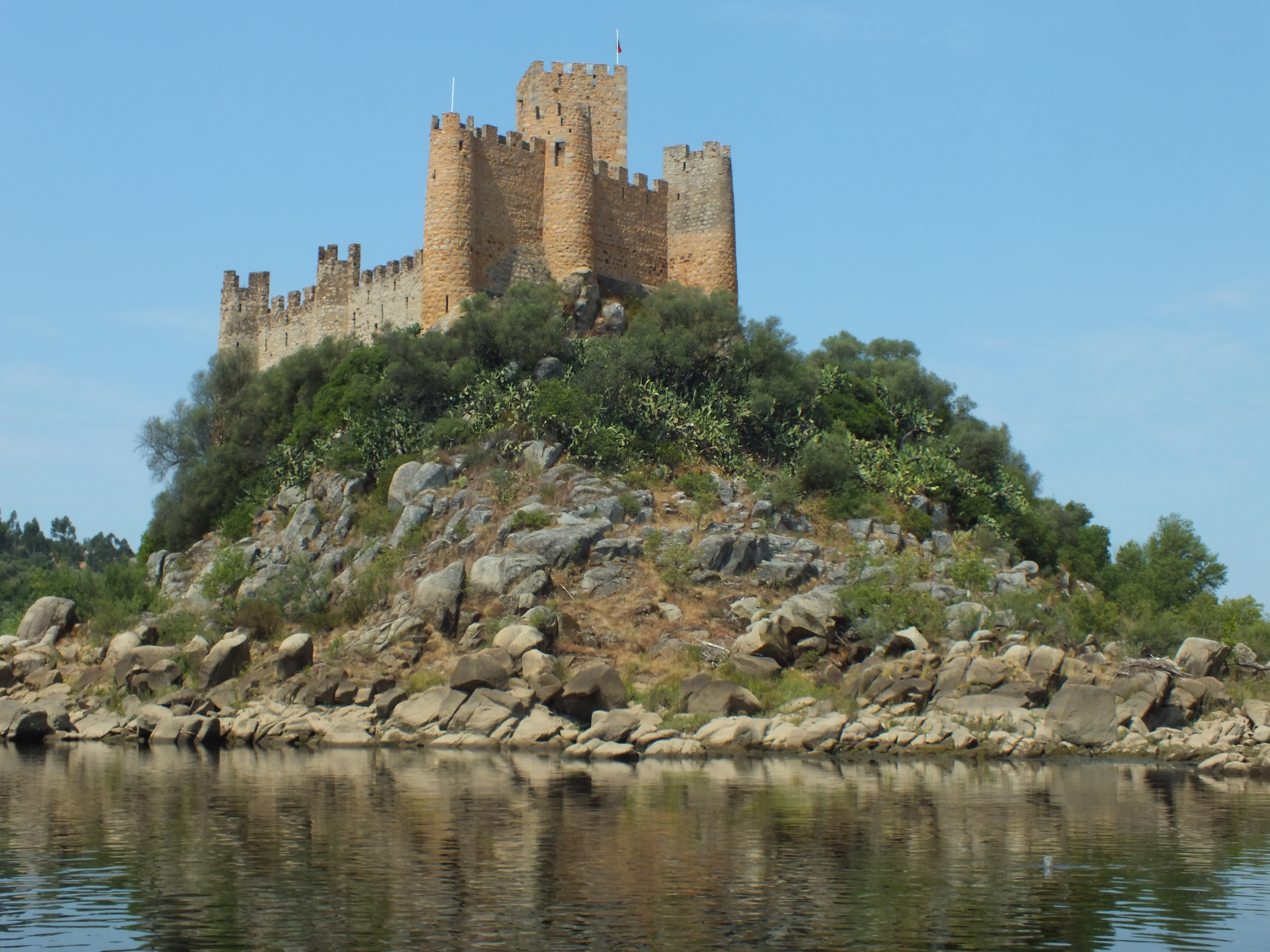
Castle of Almourol
Vila Nova da Barquinha

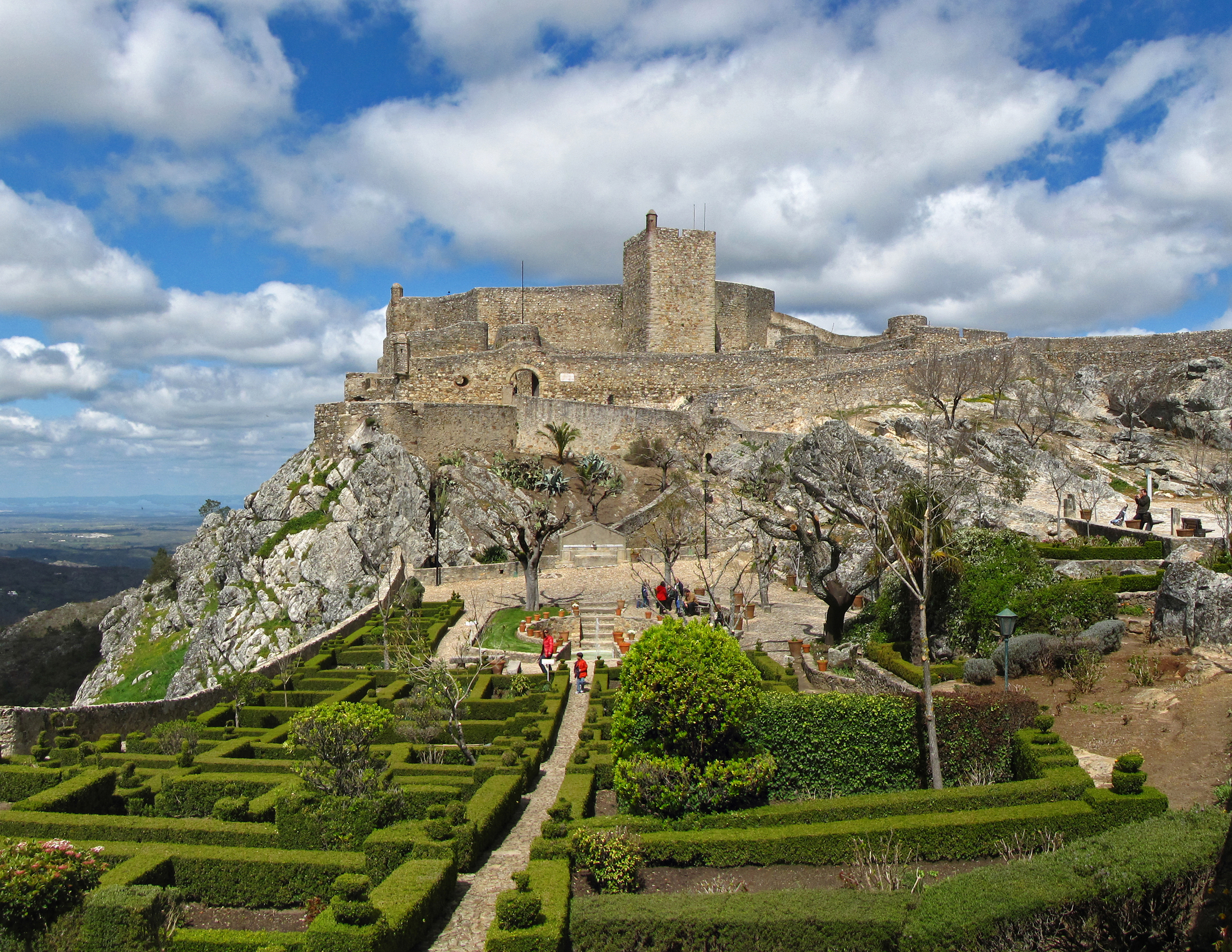
Castle of Marvão
Marvão

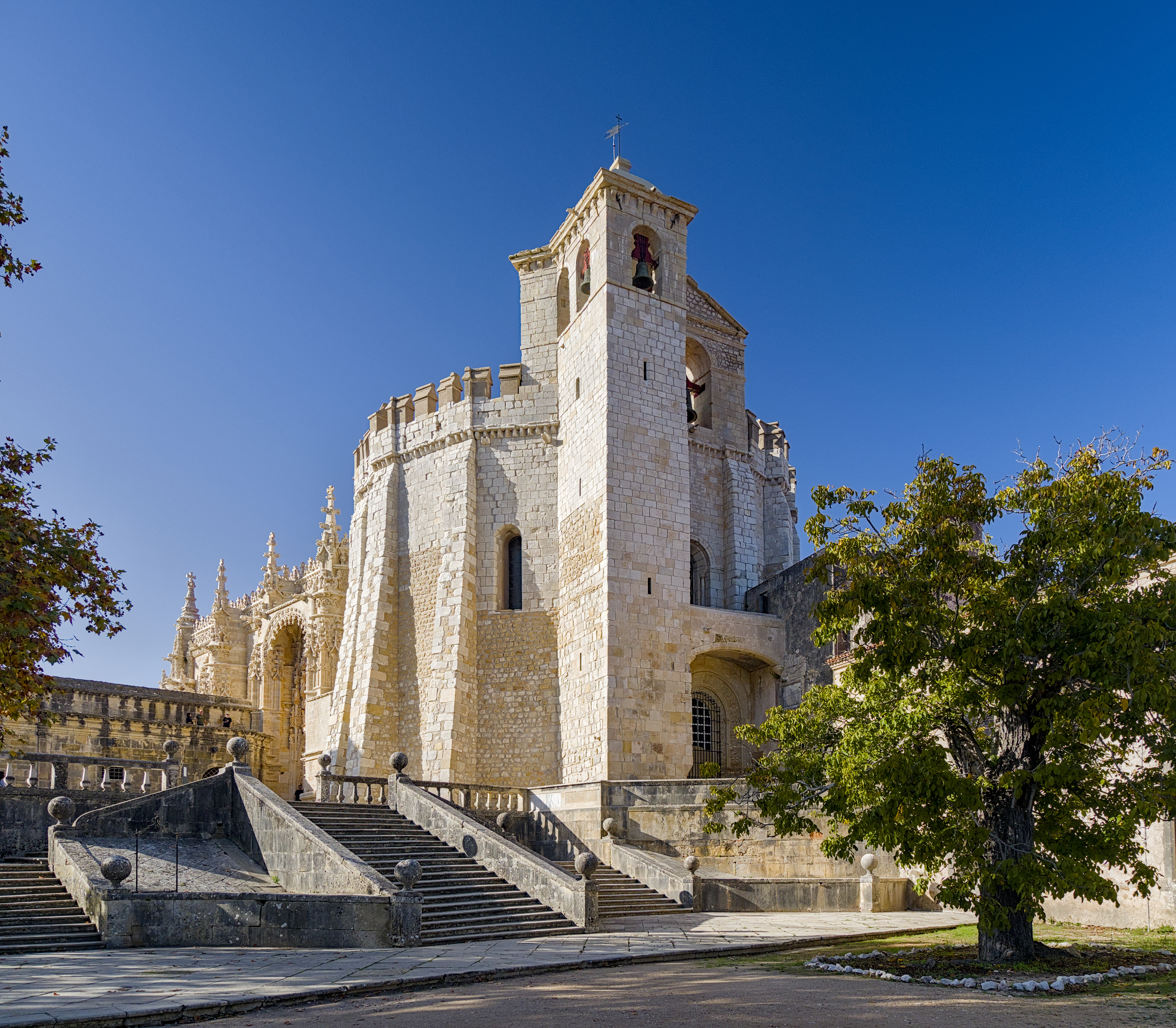
Convent of Christ
Tomar

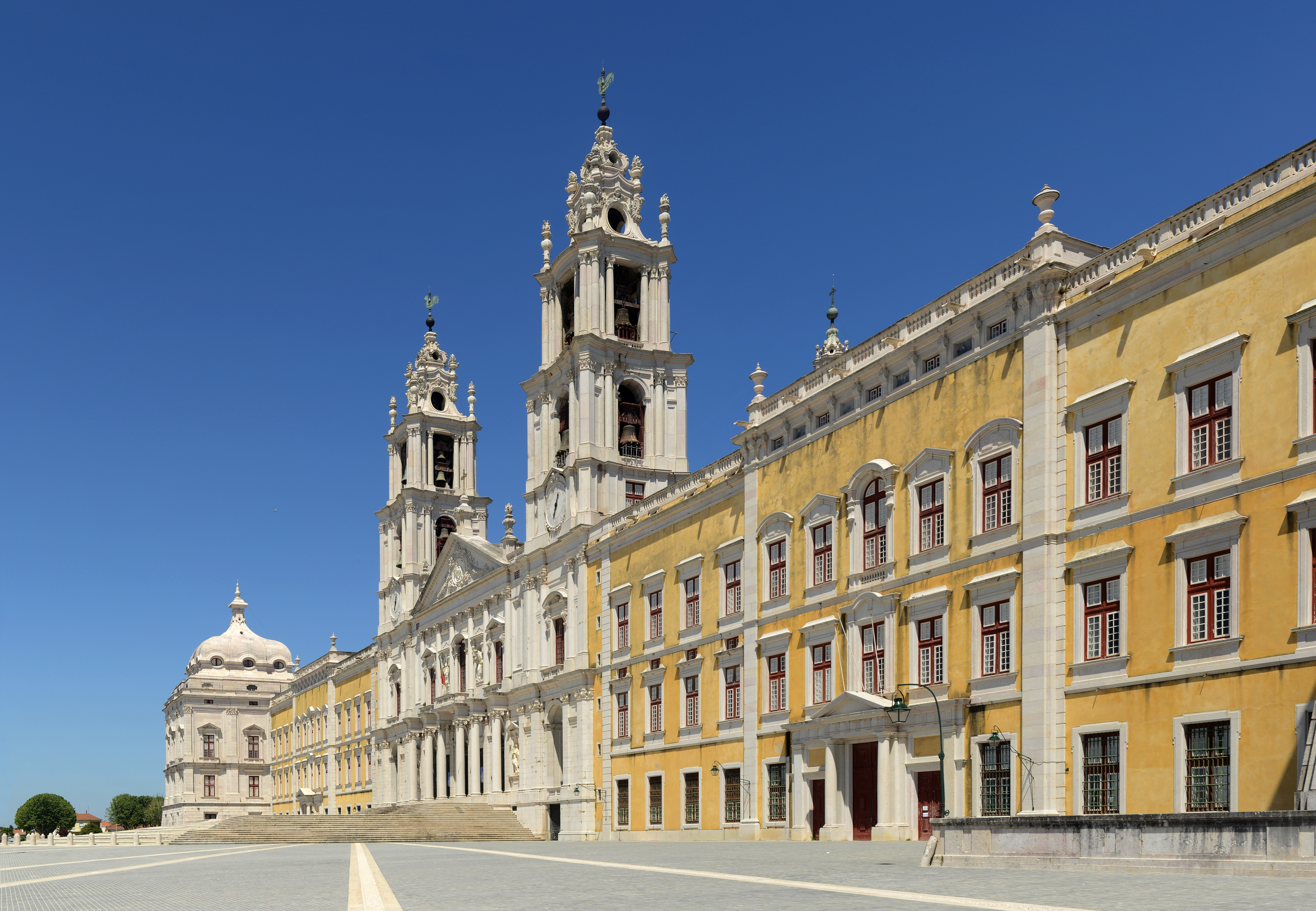
Palace of Mafra
Mafra

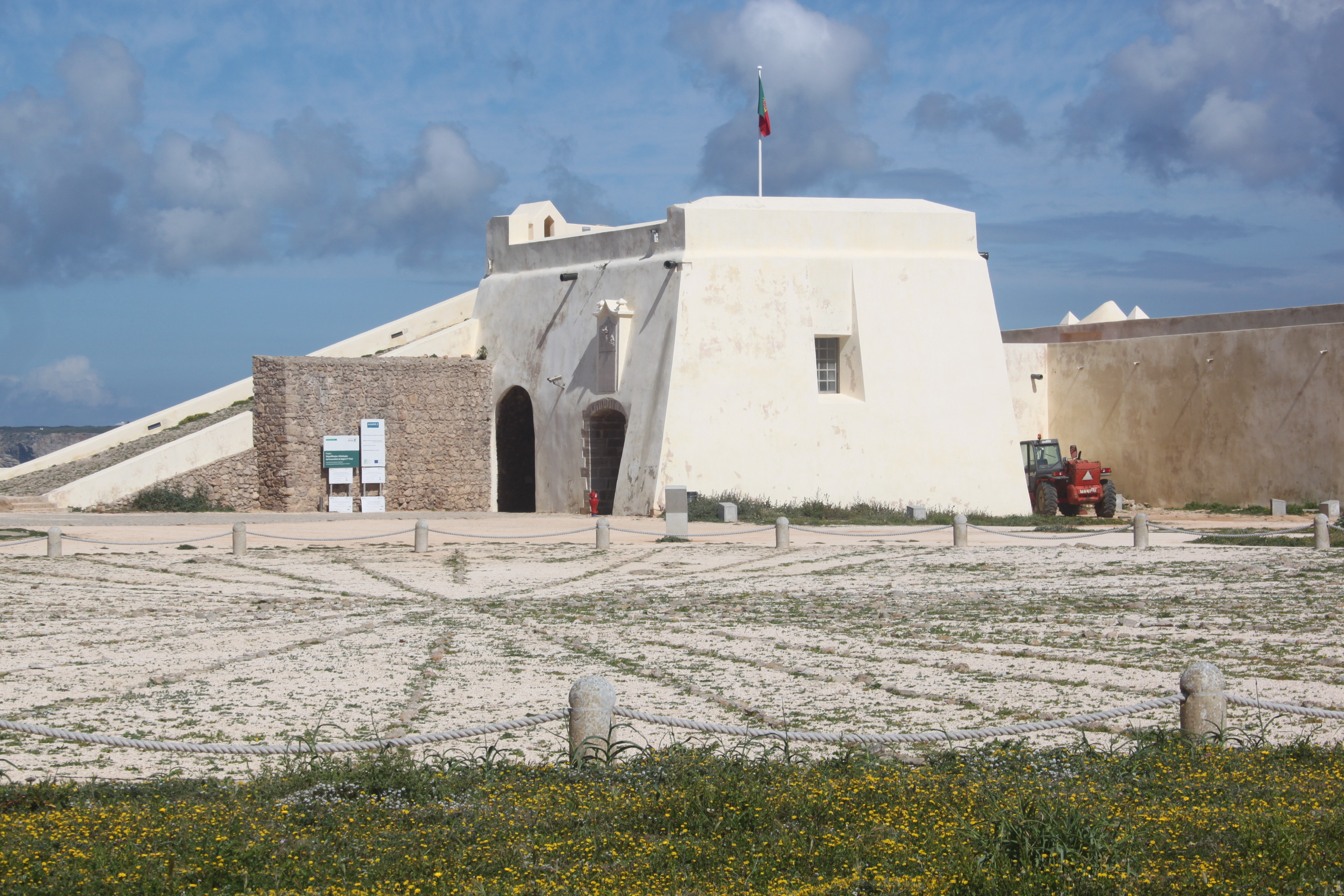
Fortress of Sagres
Vila do Bispo

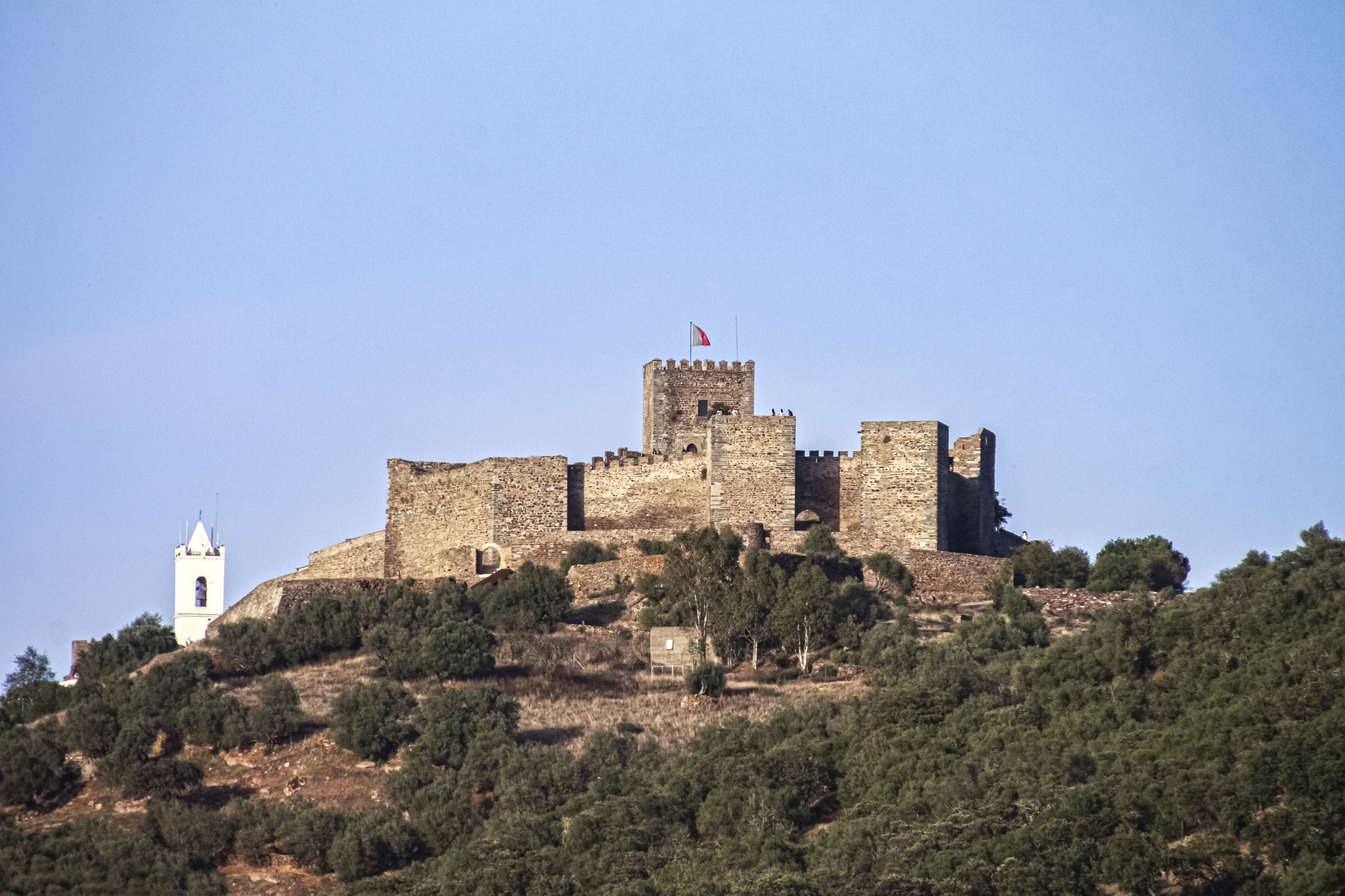
Castle of Monsaraz
Reguengos de Monsaraz

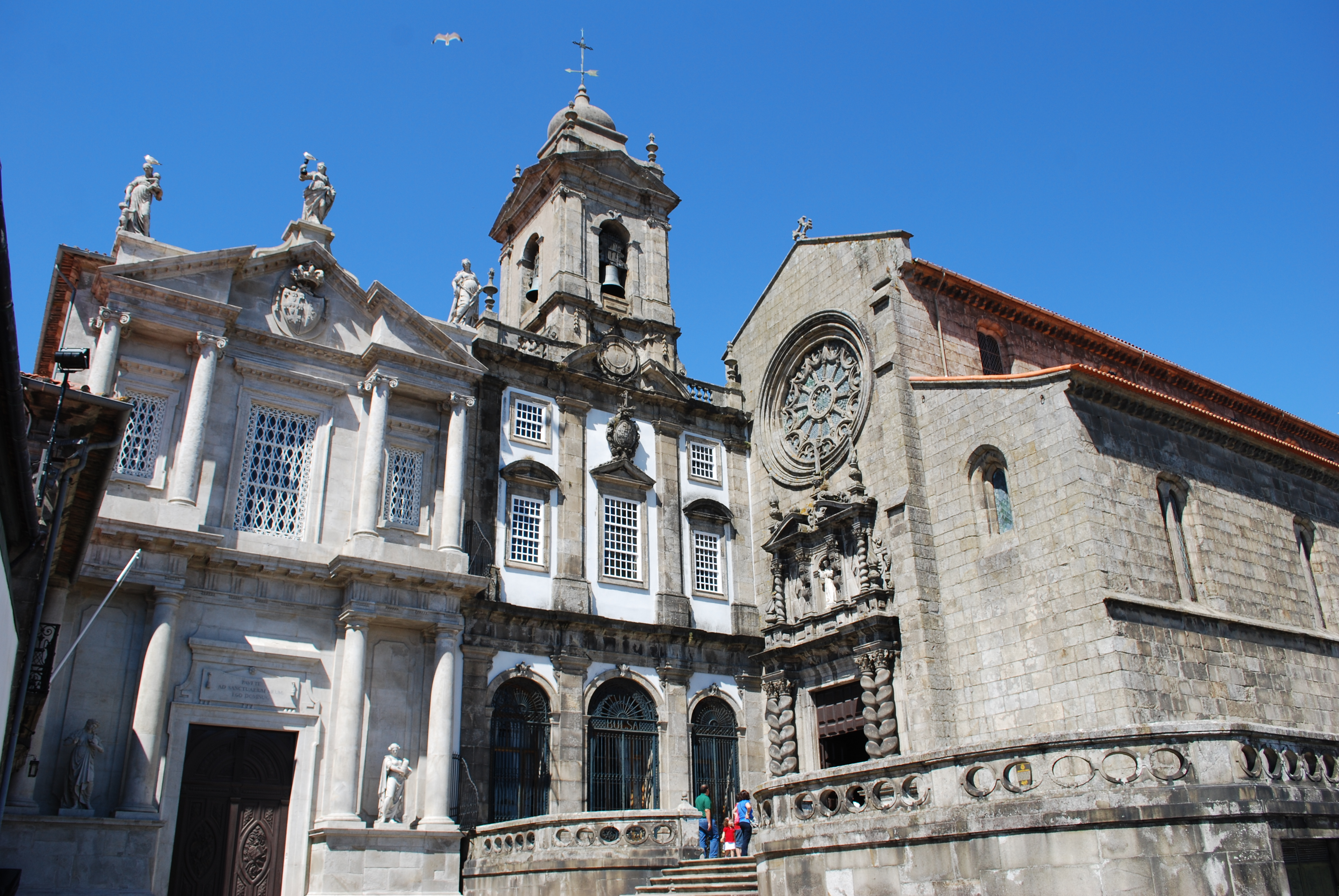
Church of São Francisco
Porto

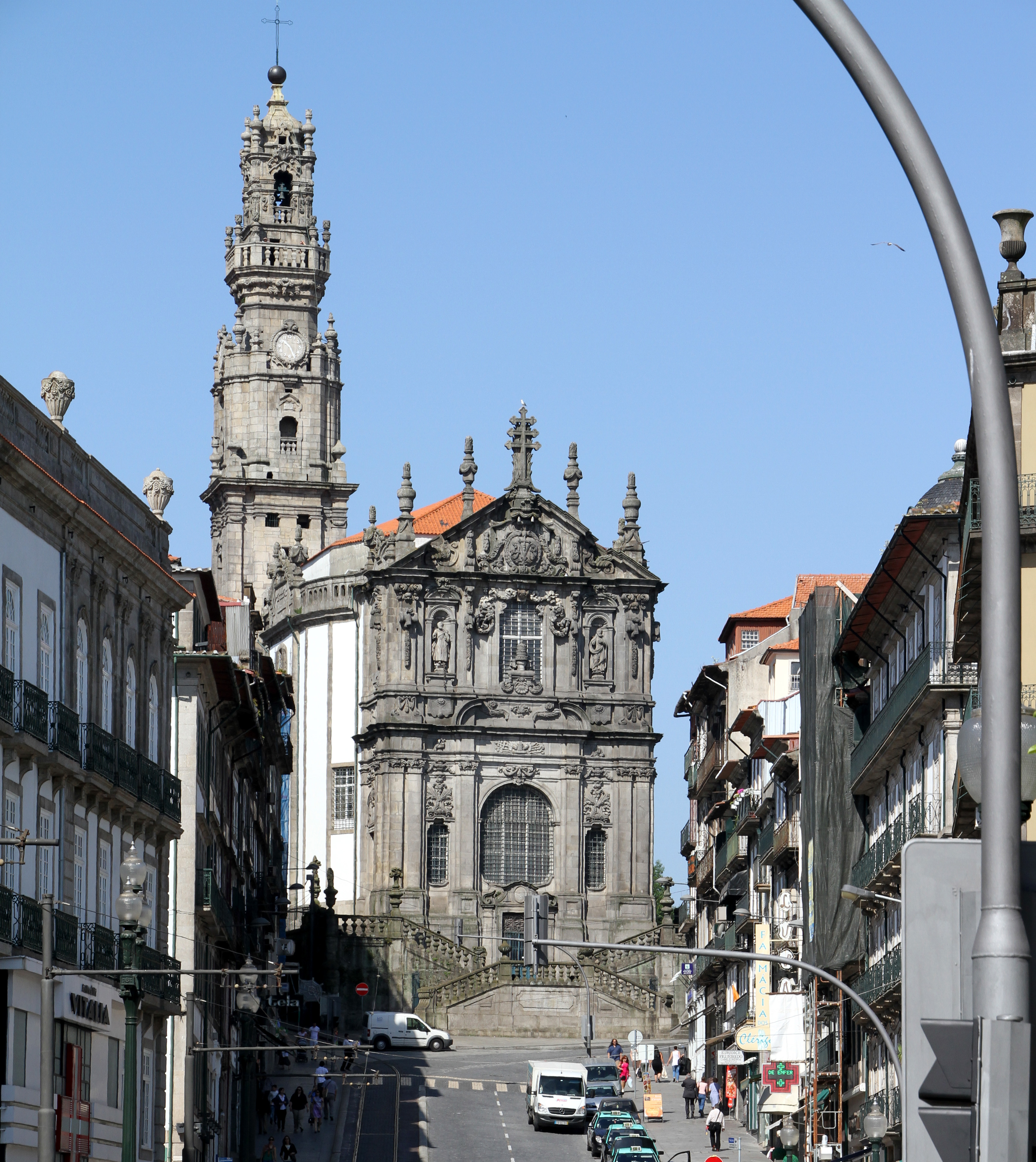
Clérigos Church
Porto

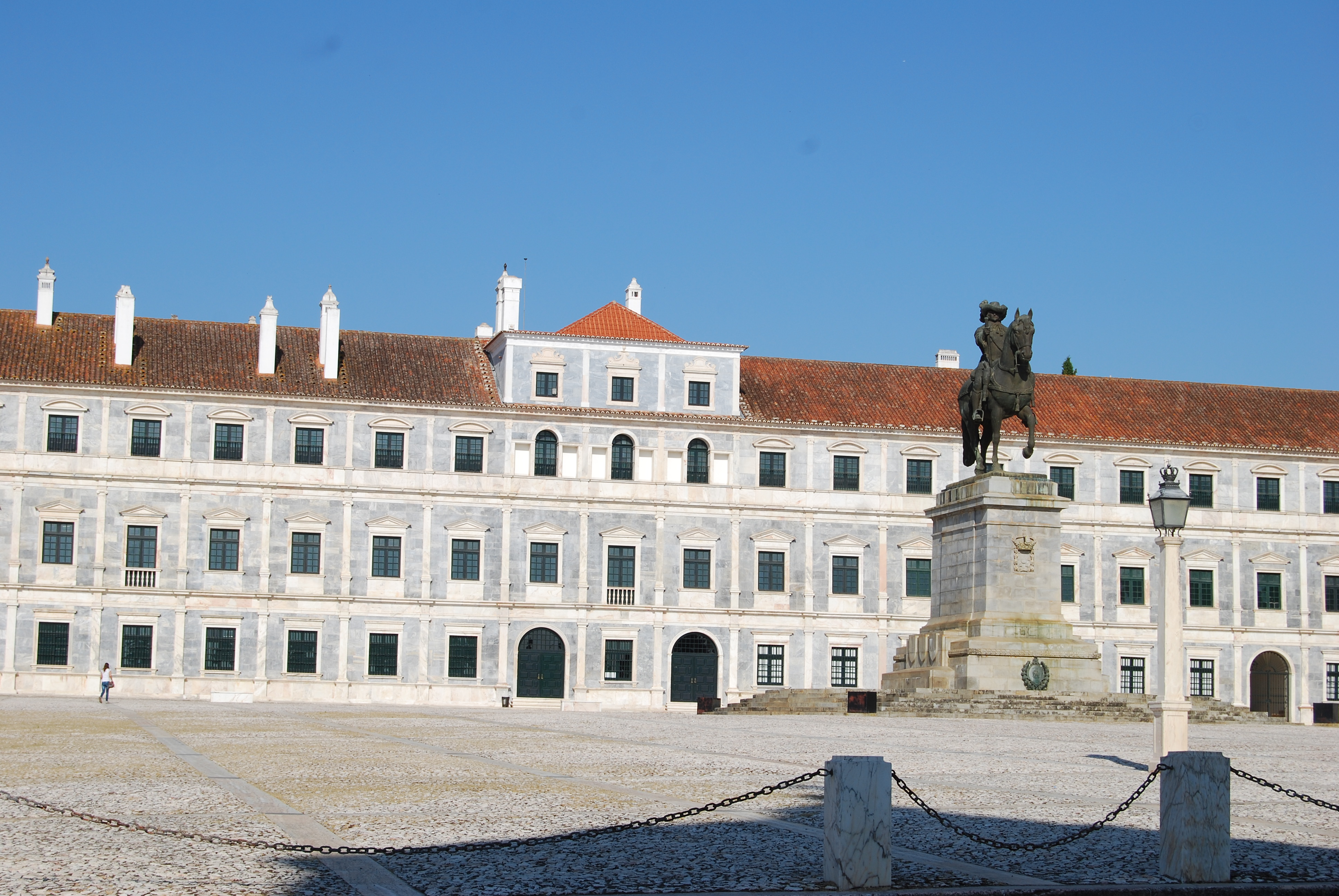
Palace of the Dukes
Vila Viçosa

University of Coimbra
Coimbra

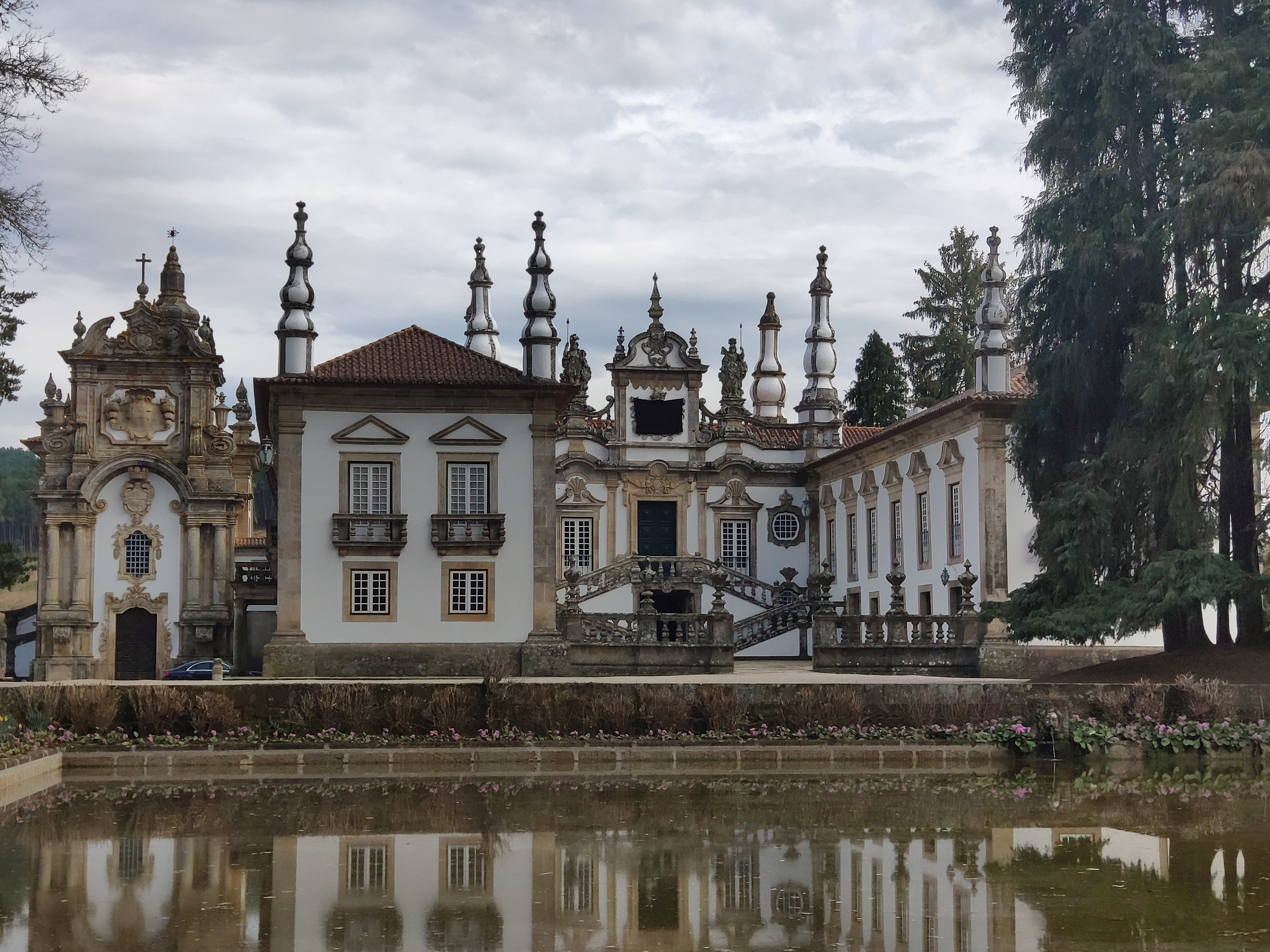
Mateus Palace
Vila Real

Queluz Palace
Sintra

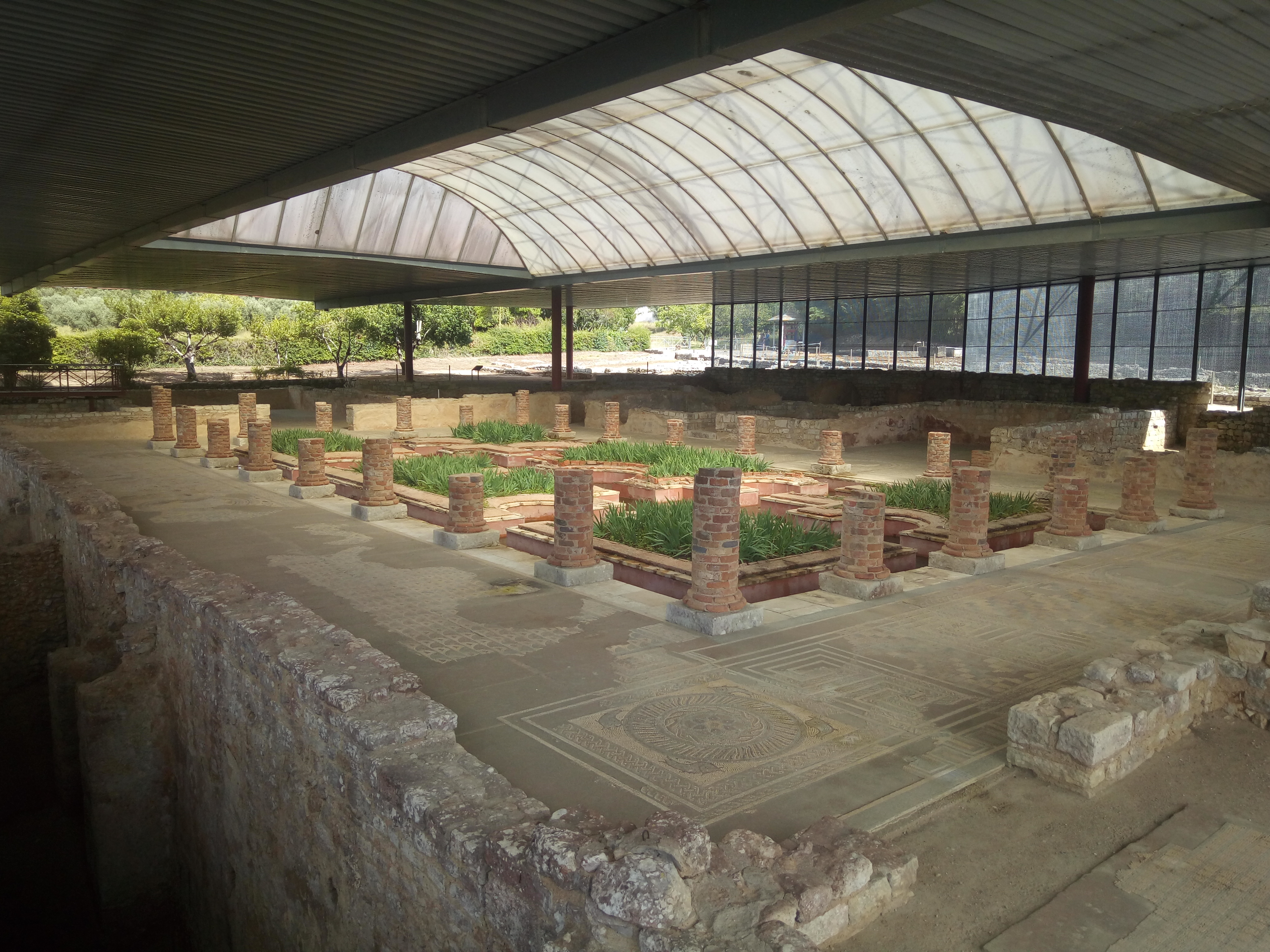
Ruins of Conímbriga
Condeixa-a-Nova

Roman Temple
Évora
