= Tourism in Colombia =

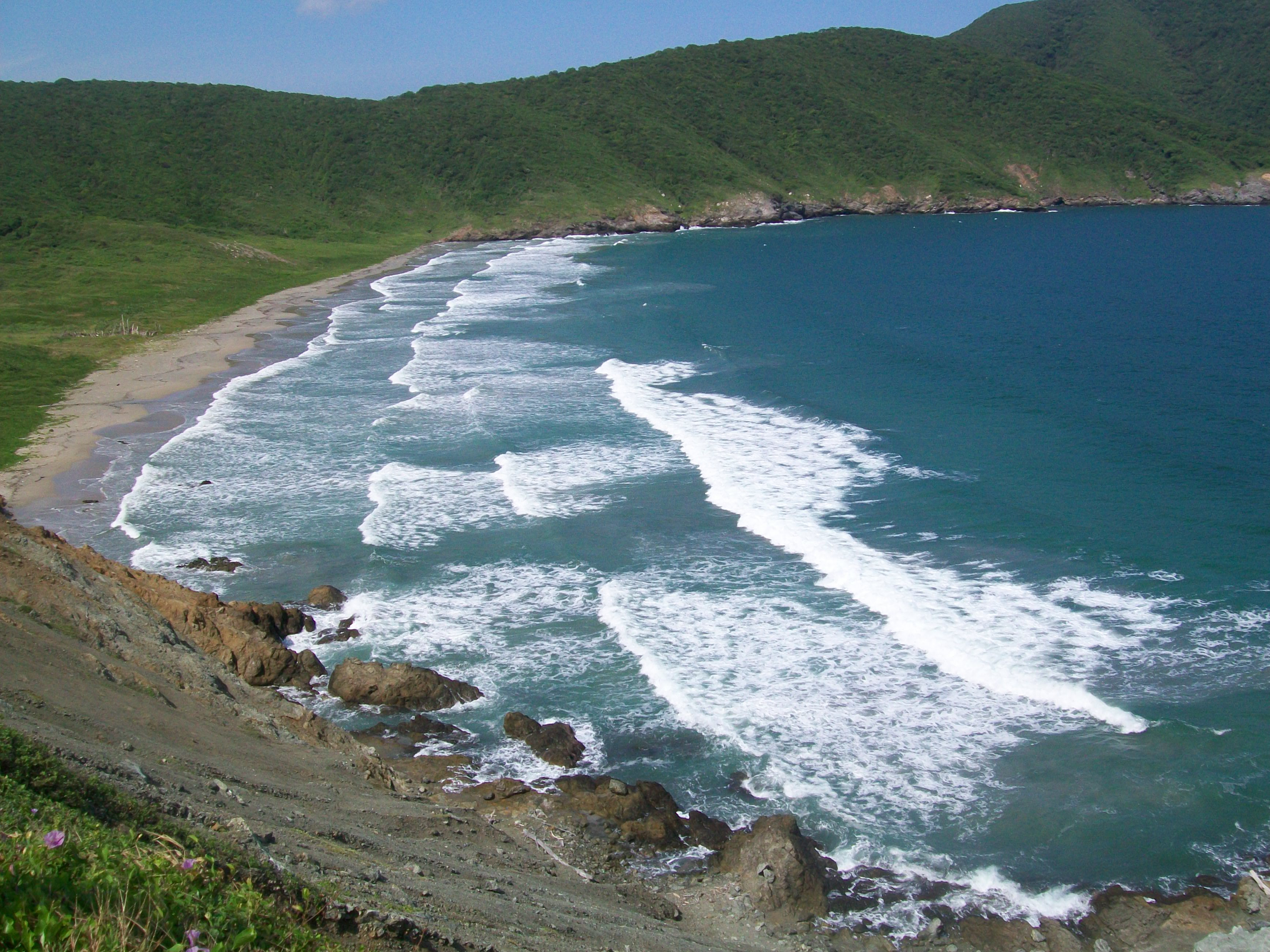
Playa Brava in Tayrona National Natural Park

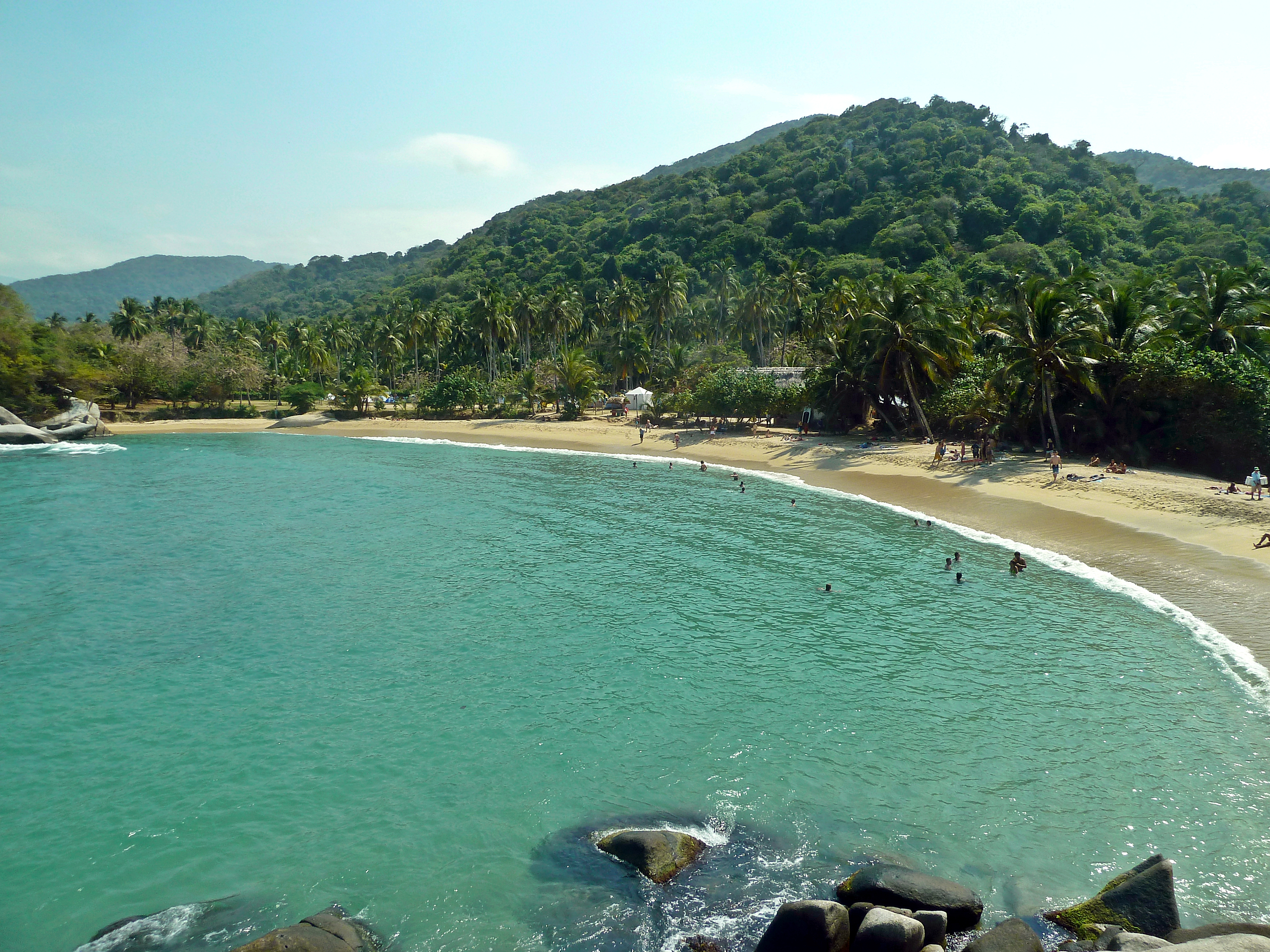
Cabo San Juan in Tayrona National Park

Tourism in Colombia contributed to 2% of the country's GDP (US$5,880 billion) and 2.5% of total employment (556,135 jobs) in 2016. Foreign tourist visits were predicted to have risen from 0.6 million in 2007 to 4 million in 2017. Responsible tourism became a peremptory need for Colombia because it minimizes negative social, economic and environmental impacts and makes positive contributions to the conservation of natural and cultural heritage.

Colombia has major attractions for a tourist destination, such as Cartagena and its historic surroundings, which are on the UNESCO World Heritage List; the insular department of San Andrés, Providencia y Santa Catalina; and Santa Marta and the surrounding area. The coffee region is also a very popular destination, especially the traditional town of Salento, Quindío and its surroundings. Fairly recently, Bogotá, the nation's capital, has become Colombia's major tourist destination because of its improved museums and entertainment facilities and its major urban renovations, including the rehabilitation of public areas, the development of parks, and the creation of an extensive network of cycling routes. With its very rich and varied geography, which includes the Amazon and Andean regions, the Llanos, the Caribbean and Pacific coasts, and the deserts of La Guajira and Tatacoa Desert, and its unique biodiversity, Colombia also has major potential for ecotourism.

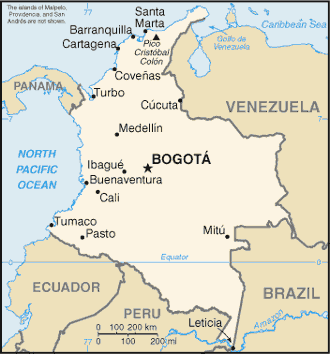
Map of Colombia

== History ==
Indigenous people inhabited what is now Colombia by 12,500 BCE. In 1500, Rodrigo de Bastidas was the first Spanish explorer of the Caribbean coast. In 1510, Vasco Núñez de Balboa founded the town of Santa María la Antigua del Darién. Throughout Colombia's history there were several rebel movements against Spanish rule, but most were unsuccessful. In 1810 the rebels, led by Simón Bolívar were successful and achieved independence from Spain.

Colombia was the first constitutional government in South America, and the Liberal and Conservative parties, founded in 1848 and 1849 respectively, are two of the oldest surviving political parties in the Americas.Slavery was abolished in the country in 1851. The United States of America's intentions to influence the area (especially the Panama Canal construction and control) led to the separation of the Department of Panama in 1903 and the establishment of it as a nation.

In the early to mid-1980s, international tourism arrivals in Colombia reached nearly 1.4 million per year. Although they decreased by more than half thereafter, they have recovered at rates of more than 10 percent annually since 2002, reaching 1.9 million visitors in 2006. Tourism usually has been considered a low-growth service industry in Colombia because of internal violence, but in 2006 the country earned US$2 billion from international tourism. Tourists visiting Colombia from abroad came mainly from the United States (24.5 percent), followed by Venezuela (13.4 percent), Ecuador (9.1 percent), Spain (6.4 percent), and Mexico (4.9 percent). Approximately 90 percent of foreign tourists arrive by air, 10 percent by land transportation, and a tiny share by sea.

The Democratic Security and Defense Policy of Álvaro Uribe Vélez (president between 2002 and 2010) organized tourist caravans (caravanas turísticas) to protect tourists and boost tourism. The caravans transported tourists to holiday celebration sites and were protected by military forces. The Democratic Security Policy's goal is to "reestablishing control over all of the nation's territory, fighting illegal drugs and organized crime, and strengthening the justice system." Another project to boost tourism and tourist safety in Colombia is the Proexport Colombia. The Ministry of Commerce, Industry and Tourism is the Colombian ministry in charge of tourism affairs.

== Land and climate ==
Colombia is located in the North West area of the South American continent. Colombia coasts are along the Caribbean Sea and Pacific Ocean. The Andes Mountains are within the borders of Colombia, and are a popular destination for tourists to hike.

Along the coast and in the northern areas of the country the climate is "warm and tropical ... with a rainy season from May to November." The temperature stays fairly consistent throughout the year because Colombia is so close to the equator. The variety in temperature comes from the level of altitude; it is much cooler in the higher altitudes of Colombia than the low land coastal areas.

== Holidays ==
Popular times to visit Colombia include the most famous festivals such as the Cali's Fair, the Barranquilla's Carnival, the Bogota Summer Festival, the Ibero-American Theater Festival, Blacks and Whites' Carnival in Pasto, Manizales fair the Flower Festival is when the most foreign tourists go to Colombia. Many people visit Colombia during Christmas time and the celebrations surrounding the Independence of Colombia. The Ministry of Tourism considers high seasons the Holy Week, the northern hemisphere summer months (June, July, August, September) and Christmas season. During the Holy Week many travel to the Caribbean Region of Colombia or visit popular landmarks like Las Lajas Cathedral, Salt Cathedral of Zipaquirá, Monserrate and Guadalupe Hill the towns of Santa Cruz de Mompox, villa de Leyva, Guamal or Popayán where Roman Catholic traditions and rituals are performed, among others. Colombia also hosts dozens of popular music festivals throughout the year, such as Rock al Parque and Estereo Picnic.

== Music ==
Colombia is known as "the land of a thousand rhythms". Colombia has more than 1,025 folk rhythms.

Some of the main genres are:

- Chandé (from Colombian Atlantic Coast). It is a cheerful and partying rhythm that is part of the coastal idiosyncrasies and carnivals. It comes from the fusion of indigenous rhythms with African black music
- Alabaos (Funeral dirge in dialogue, Afro-Colombian culture)
- Bambuco (from Colombian Andean region, European rithm)
- Bullerengue (from Caribbean Region, Afro-Colombian music)
- Bunde chocoano (from Chocó Region, Afro-Colombians learned from the Native Americans when as black slaves during colonial escaped and took refuge in remote areas and were received with hospitality by Native Americans of the Pacific coast)
- Bunde tolimense (Euro-Colombian music)
- Cumbia (most representative from the Atlantic Coast, indigenous and African rhythm, of great expressive richness, it has variations by region)
- Currulao (from Pacific Region, Afro-Colombian culture)
- Danza Colombia (from Colombian Andes, from European origin with Indigenous elements)
- Guabina (from Andes Region, Indigenous rithm)
- Joropo (from Los Llanos Venezuelan-Colombian Region, its lyrics are messages that express the values of the llaneran people, European origin music genre)
- Mapalé (from Atlantic coast, Afro-Colombian rithm)
- Merecumbé (mix between Colombian merengue and cumbia of Atlantic coast, created by Pacho Galán in 1950s)
- Colombian Pasillo (European origin)
- Carranga The carranga, carranguera music or peasant music, is a genre of folk music originated in the Colombian Andean region, more exactly in the department of Boyacá in the 1970s, of the hand of the composer Jorge Velosa and the Carrangueros de Ráquira .In the execution of the carranguera music the guitar, the tiple, requinto-tiple, the guacharaca and the voice are used.
- Porro
- Sanjuanero (bambuco and joropo fussion)
- Champeta (The classical conception of champetuísmo has four important aspects: musical expression, its distinctive jargon, the "picós" and perreos -fiestas and verbenas-. Some give the same importance to other aspects, such as dancing, political activism, designing clothing, audiovisual aspect of its videos, and other cultural elements, of Afro-Colombian music)
- Torbellino (representative songs of the departments of Boyacá, Cundinamarca and Santander, It tune of religious and family fiestas)
- Vallenato (from Atlantic Coast Region, it is important to the narrative nature of love's stories or descriptions of people, it was declared Intangible Cultural Heritage of the Nation).

== Visitors ==
Tourist arrivals of 2019 in %

Most visitors arriving in Colombia on a short-term basis are from the following countries:

Rank	Country	2016	2017
1	Venezuela	352,392	767,347
2	United States	498,960	529,013
3	Brazil	181,852	209,138
4	Argentina	135,151	185,891
5	Mexico	158,975	171,841
6	Ecuador	167,121	168,998
7	Peru	140,055	140,905
8	Chile	127,271	138,647
9	Spain	104,623	112,637
10	Panama	103,014	110,629

Yearly tourist arrivals in millions

== Ecotourism ==
The great variety in geography, flora and fauna across Colombia has also resulted in the development of an ecotourist industry, concentrated in the country's national parks. Popular ecotourist destinations include: along the Caribbean coast, the Tayrona National Natural Park in the Sierra Nevada de Santa Marta mountain range and Cabo de la Vela on the tip of the Guajira Peninsula; the Nevado del Ruiz volcano, the Cocora valley and the Tatacoa Desert in the central Andean region, the Farallones de Cali National Natural Park, in the department of Valle del Cauca; Amacayacu National Park in the Amazon River basin; and the Pacific islands of Malpelo and Gorgona, there other unique landscapes like the river of the seven colors in Meta. As of 2018, there are nine World Heritage Sites in Colombia, including six cultural sites, two natural sites and one mixed site.

== National parks ==
National Parks of Colombia

Colombia has two coastlines; Pacific and Caribbean, three main mountainous chains and the isolated Sierra Nevada de Santa Marta, and many different ecological regions, from páramo to tropical jungle vegetation to desert biomes. The country hosts numerous volcanoes and waterfalls.

- Amacayacu National Park
- Cabo de la Vela
- Chiribiquete National Park
- Cocora valley
- Los Nevados
- Doña Juana-Cascabel Volcanic Complex
- Gorgona and Malpelo islands
- Los Katíos National Park
- Munchique National Park
- Serranía de la Macarena
- Sierra Nevada de Santa Marta National Park
- PANACA Park
- Tayrona Park (Santa Marta)
- Tatacoa Desert
- Chicamocha Canyon National Park
- El Mariposario entomologia display specialized in Lepidoptera
- Peñas Blancas rock climbing site

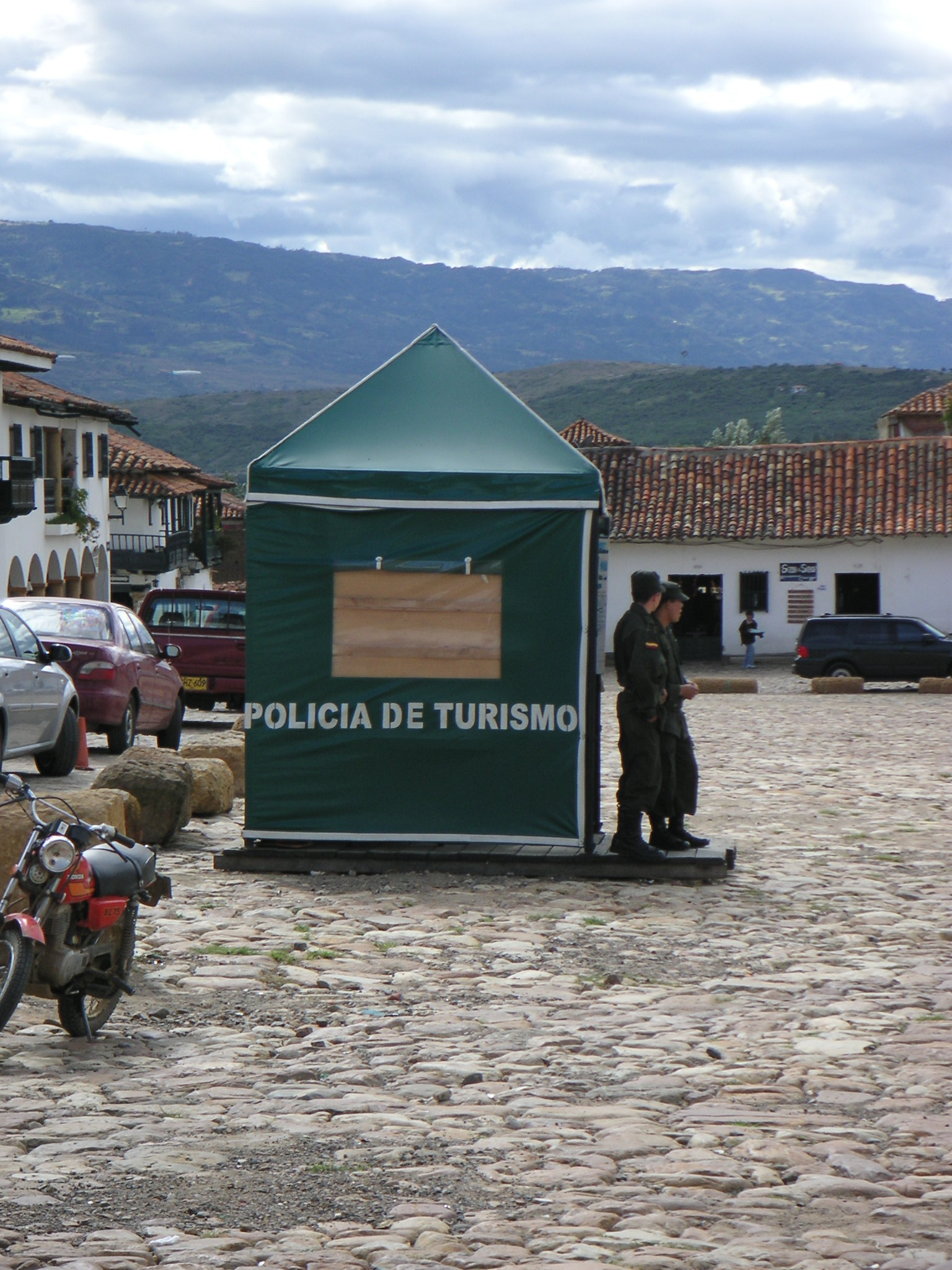
Tourism Police, a unit of the Colombian National Police deployed to tourist areas to improve security. Here in the town of Villa de Leyva.

== Safety ==
For many years serious internal armed conflict deterred tourists from visiting Colombia, with official travel advisories warning against travel to the country. However, in recent years numbers have risen sharply, thanks to improvements in security resulting from former president and convicted paramilitar Álvaro Uribe's "democratic security" strategy, which has included significant increases in military strength and police presence throughout the country and pushed rebel groups further away from the major cities, highways and tourist sites likely to attract international visitors. Foreign tourist visits were predicted to have risen from 0.6 million in 2007 to 4 million in 2017. Responsible tourism became a peremptory need for Colombia because minimizes negative social, economic and environmental impacts and makes positive contributions to the conservation of natural and cultural heritage.

Travel guide Lonely Planet ranked Colombia second in its list of best countries to visit in 2017. Colombia has been celebrated for its forward-thinking vibrant culture and hospitality.

== Transportation ==
=== Railways ===
The nation's rail network links seven of the country's 10 major cities. During 2004–6, approximately 2,000 kilometers of the country's rail lines underwent refurbishment. This upgrade involved two main projects: the 1,484-kilometer line linking Bogotá to the Caribbean Coast and the 499-kilometer Pacific coastal network that links the industrial city of Cali and the surrounding coffee-growing region to the port of Buenaventura.

=== Roads ===
Highways are managed by the Colombian Ministry of Transport through the National Roads Institute. The security of the highways in Colombia is managed by the Highway Police unit of the Colombian National Police. Colombia is crossed by the Panamerican Highway.

=== Ports, waterways, and merchant marine ===
A well-developed and important form of transport for both cargo and passengers, inland waterways transport approximately 3.8 million metric tons of freight and more than 5.5 million passengers annually. Main inland waterways are the Magdalena–Cauca River system, which is navigable for 1,500 kilometers; the Atrato, which is navigable for 687 kilometers; the Orinoco system of more than five navigable rivers, which total more than 4,000 kilometers of potential navigation (mainly through Venezuela); and the Amazonas system, which has four main rivers totaling 3,000 navigable kilometers (mainly through Brazil). The government is planning an ambitious program to more fully utilize the main rivers for transport.

=== Aviation ===
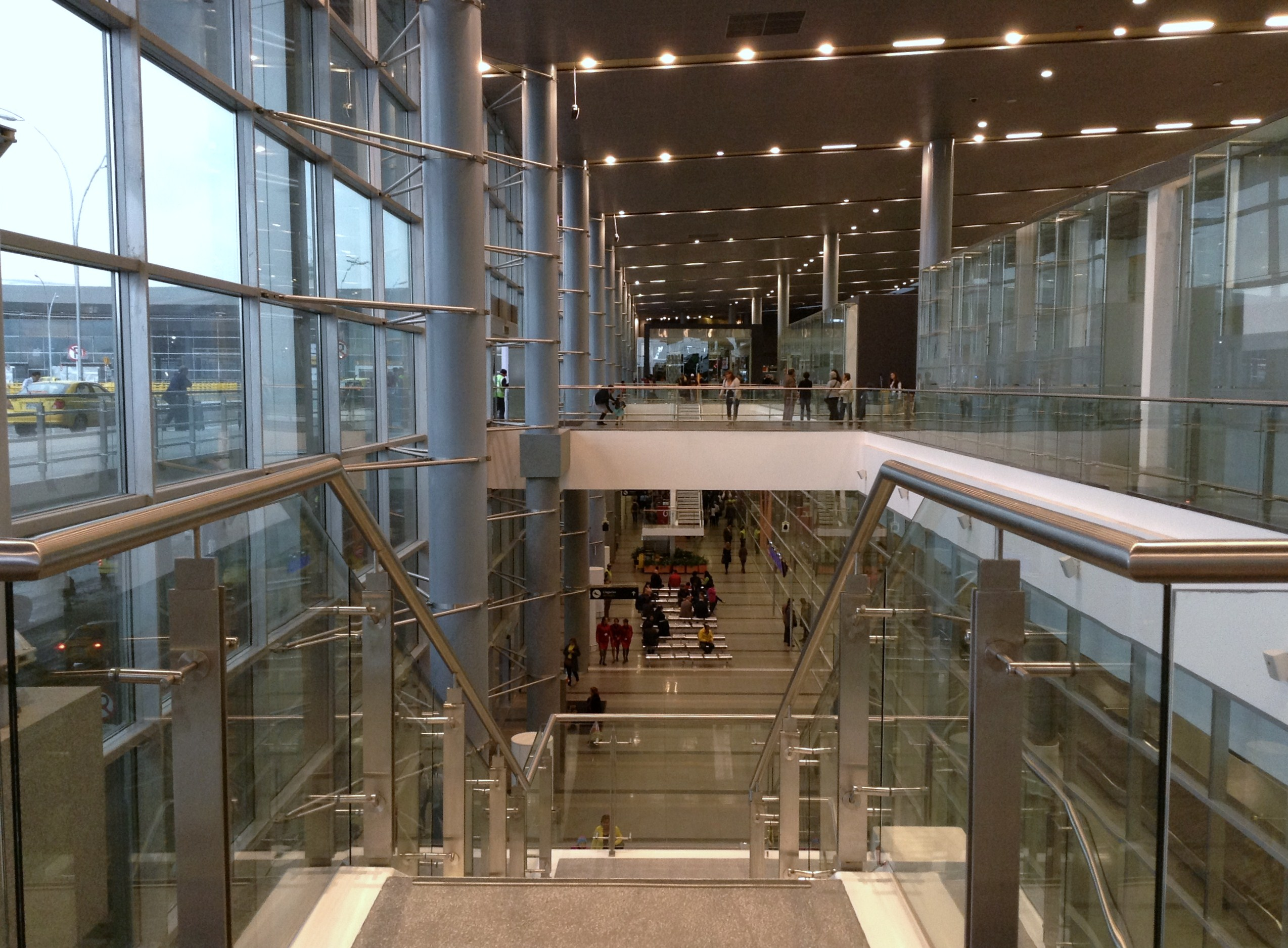
El Dorado International Airport of Bogotá

All public airports in Colombia are managed and controlled by the Special Administrative Unit of Civil Aeronautics.

Colombia has well-developed air routes and an estimated total of 984 airports, 100 of which have paved runways, plus two heliports. Of the 74 main airports, 20 can accommodate jet aircraft. Two airports are more than 3,047 meters in length, nine are 2,438–3,047 meters, 39 are 1,524–2,437 meters, 38 are 914–1,523 meters, 12 are shorter than 914 meters, and 880 have unpaved runways. The government has been selling its stake in local airports in order to allow their privatization. The country has 40 regional airports, and the cities of Bogotá, Medellín, Cali, Barranquilla, Bucaramanga, Cartagena, Cúcuta, Leticia, Pereira, San Andrés, and Santa Marta have international airports. Bogotá's El Dorado International Airport handles 550 million metric tons of cargo and 22 million passengers a year, making it the largest airport in Latin America in terms of cargo and the third largest in passenger numbers.

=== Urban transport ===
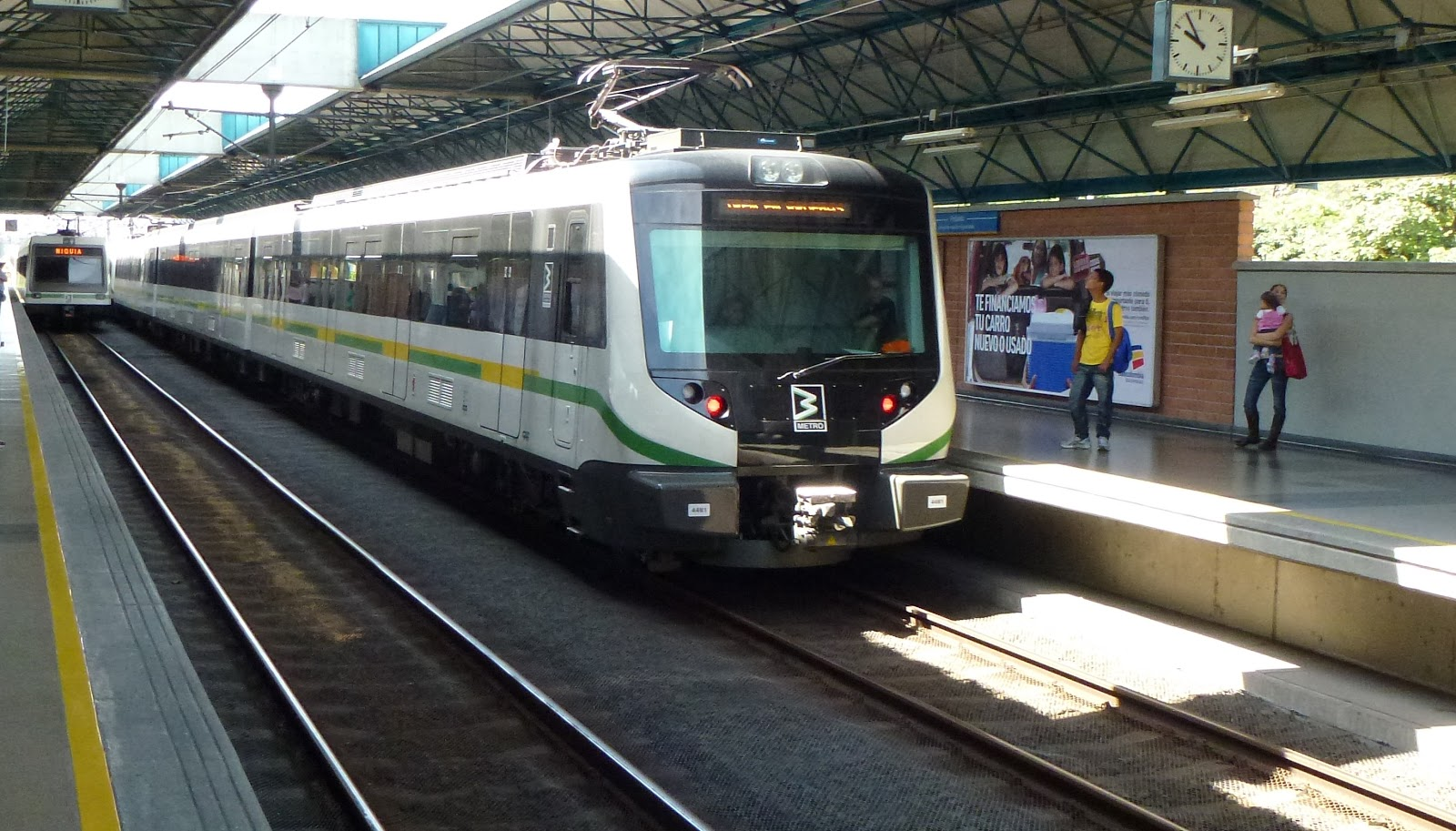
Medellín Metro

Urban transport systems have been developed in Bogotá, Medellín, Cali and Barranquilla. Traffic congestion in Bogotá has been greatly exacerbated by the lack of rail transport. However, this problem has been alleviated somewhat by the development of one of the world's largest and highest capacity bus rapid transit (BRT) systems, known as the TransMilenio (opened 2000), and the restriction of vehicles through a daily, rotating ban on private cars depending on plate numbers. Bogotá's system consists of bus and minibus services managed by both private- and public-sector enterprises. Since 1995 Medellín has had a modern urban railway referred to as the Metro de Medellín, which also connects with the cities of Itagüí, Envigado, and Bello. A BRT line called Metroplús began operating in 2011, with a second line added in 2013. Other cities have also installed BRT systems such as Cali with a six line system (opened 2008), Barranquilla with two lines (opened 2010), Bucaramanga with one line (opened 2010), Cartagena with one line (opened 2015) and Pereira with three lines (opened 2006).

== World Heritage Sites ==
As of 2018, there are nine World Heritage Sites in Colombia, including six cultural sites, two natural sites and one mixed site.

Site	Image	Location	Criteria	Area ha (acre)	Year	Description
Chiribiquete National Park– "The Maloca of the Jaguar"	A tepui within the Chiribiquete National Park.	Caquetá and Guaviare Departments, Colombia; 0°31′31″N 72°47′50″W	Mixed: (iii), (ix), (x)	2,782,354 (6,875,350); buffer zone 3,989,682.82 (9,858,721.0)	2018	Located in the north-west Colombian Amazon, Chiribiquete National Park is the largest protected area in the country. One of the defining features of the park is the presence of tepuis (the Native American word for table-top mountains), sheer-sided sandstone plateaux that dominate the forest. Over 75,000 paintings, spanning more than 20,000 years to the present, are to be seen on the walls of the 60 rock shelters around the bases of the tepuis. Believed to be linked to the worship of the jaguar, a symbol of power and fertility, these paintings depict hunting scenes, battles, dances and ceremonies. The indigenous communities, which are not directly present on the site, consider the region sacred.
Coffee Cultural Landscape of Colombia		Caldas, Quindío and Risaralda Departments; 5°28′18″N 75°40′54″W	Cultural: (v)(vi)	141,120 (348,700)	2011	Encompasses six farming landscapes that use the "centennial tradition of coffee growing in small plots in the high forest and the way farmers have adapted cultivation to difficult mountain conditions."
Historic Centre of Santa Cruz de Mompox		Bolívar Department; 9°14′00″N 74°26′00″W	Cultural: (iv)(v)	0	1995	It was a town center in the Colonial period and the colonial architecture has been preserved.
Los Katíos National Park		Antioquia and Chocó Departments; 7°40′00″N 77°00′00″W	Natural: (ix)(x)	141,120 (348,700)	1994	Forests and low hills that is the habitat for many endangered animals and plants.
Malpelo Fauna and Flora Sanctuary		Valle del Cauca Department; 3°58′00″N 81°37′00″W	Natural: (vii)(ix)	857,500 (2,119,000)	2006	A designated non-fishing area that provides a rich habitat for sharks, giant grouper and billfish and the rare, short-nosed ragged-toothed shark.
National Archeological Park of Tierradentro		Cauca Department; 2°35′00″N 76°02′00″W	Cultural: (iii)	0	1995	National archeological park with several human figure statues, and large tombs.
Port, Fortresses and Group of Monuments, Cartagena		Bolívar Department; 10°25′00″N 75°32′00″W	Cultural: (iii)	0	1984	The most extensive fortifications in South America.
Qhapaq Ñan, Andean Road System		Nariño Department, shared with Argentina; Bolivia; Chile; Ecuador; Peru; 18°15′00″S 69°35′30″W	Cultural: (ii)(iii)(iv)(vi)	11,407 (28,190)	2014	Most advanced pre-Columbian transportation system. "This site is an extensive Inca communication, trade and defense network of roads covering 30,000 km"
San Agustín Archaeological Park		Huila Department; 1°55′00″N 76°14′00″W	Cultural: (iii)	0	1995	Pre-Columbian, carved volcanic stone figures and tombs in the Forest of Statues, native trees and flowers. Lavapatas Spring's rock bed and ceremonial water channels and reptilian shapes.

== Notable celebrations ==
- Barranquilla's Carnival
- Blacks and Whites' Carnival
- Holy Week in Popayán
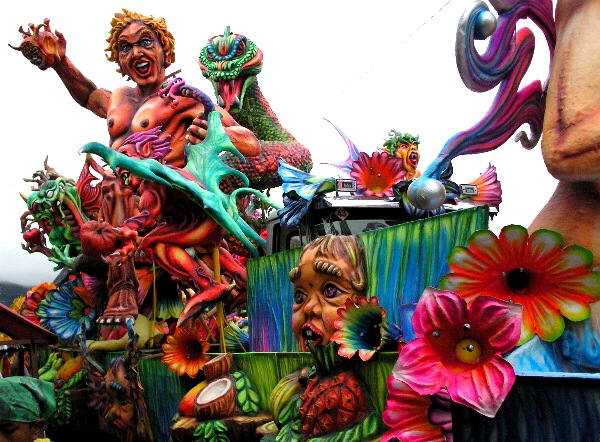
Blacks and Whites' Carnival

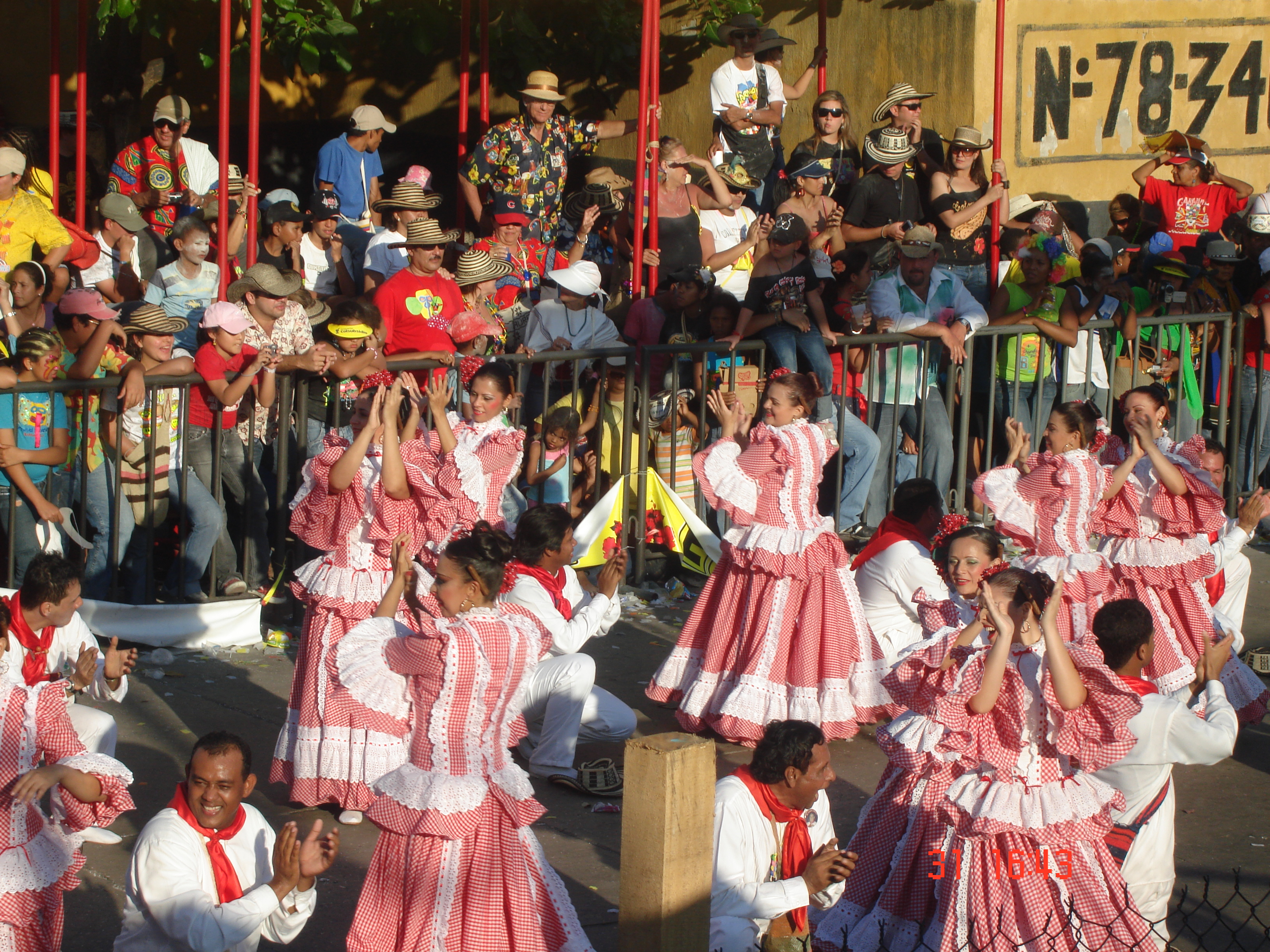
Barranquilla's Carnival

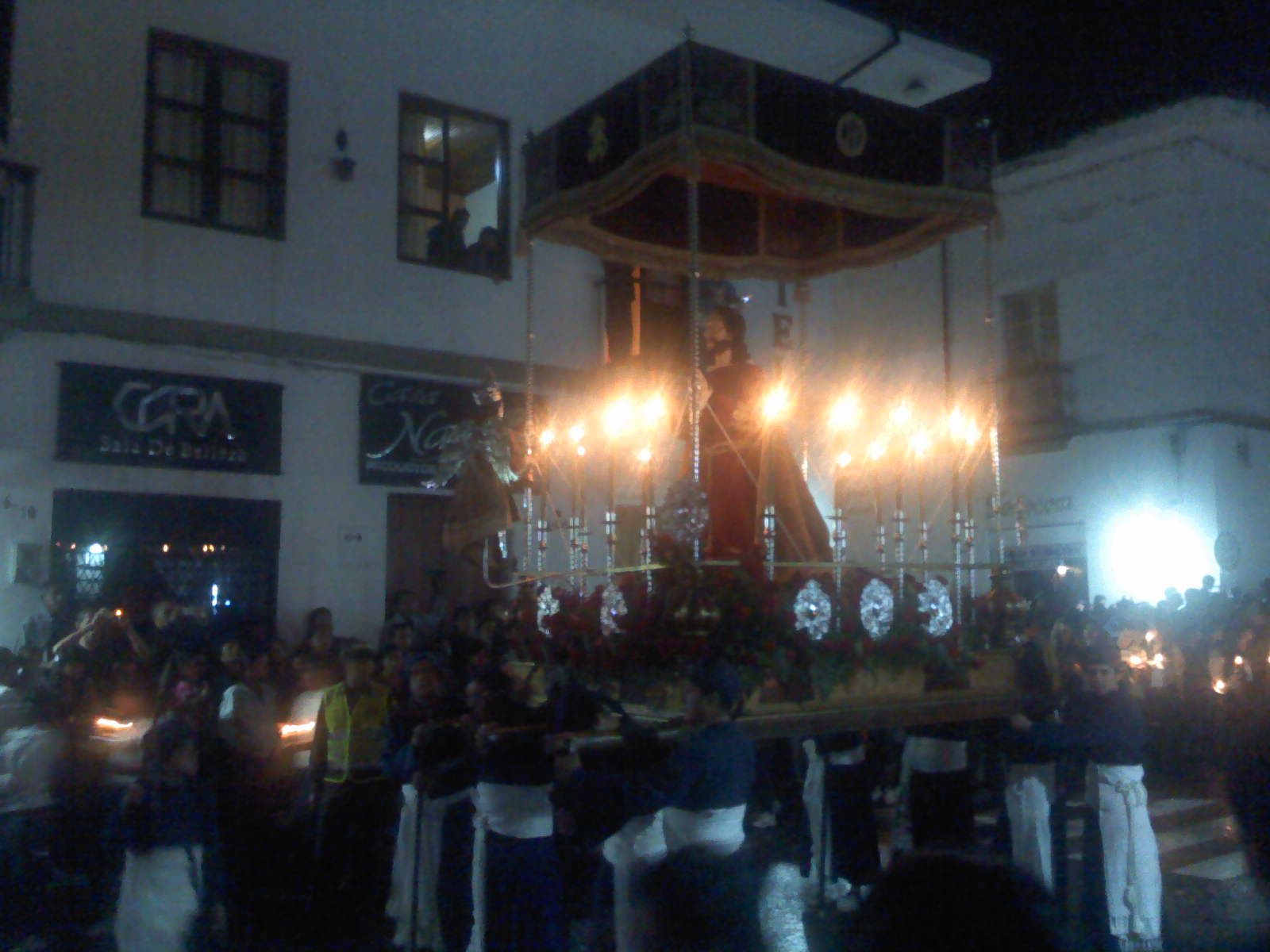
Holy Week in Popayán

== Gallery ==
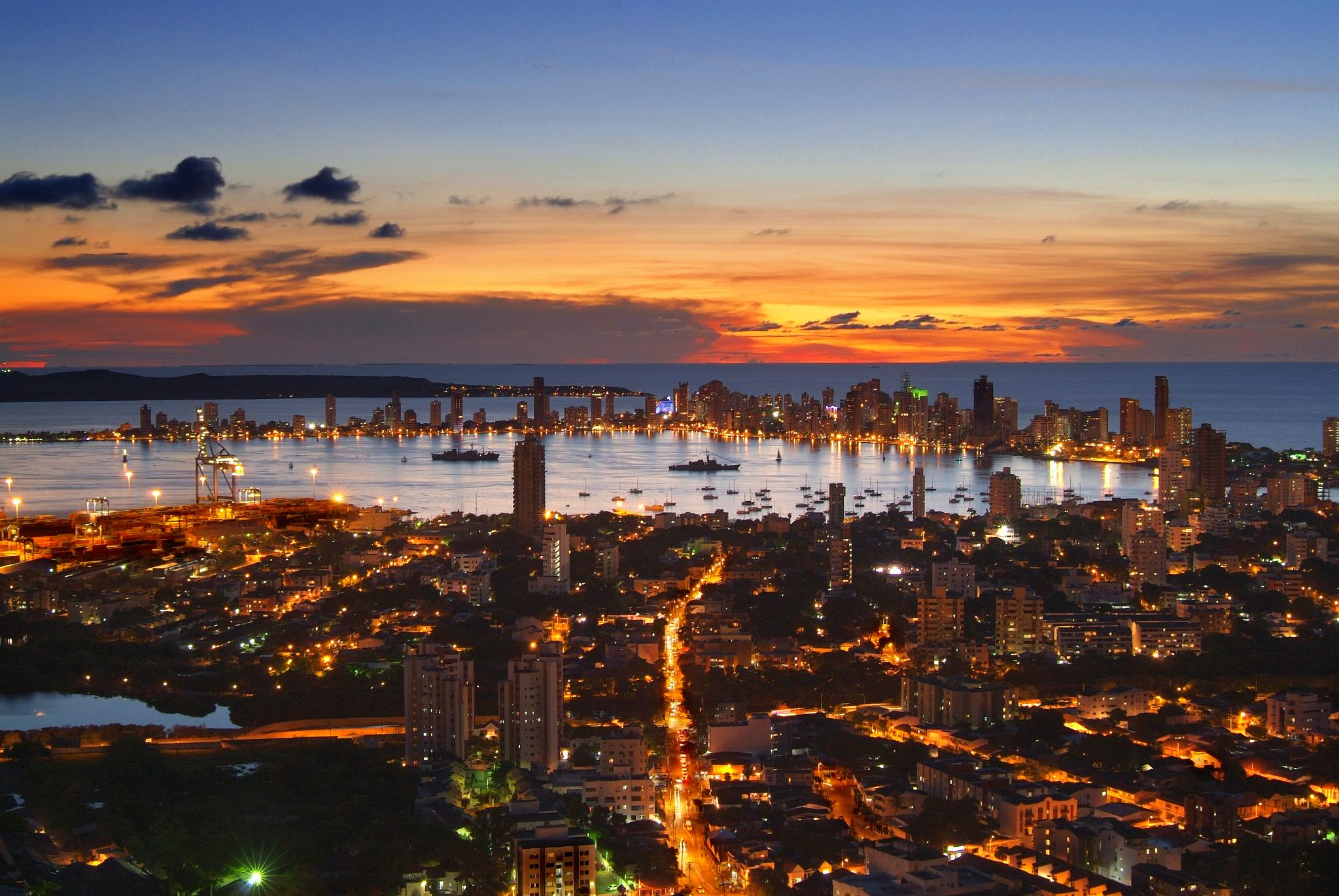
Cartagena de Indias
Bolívar

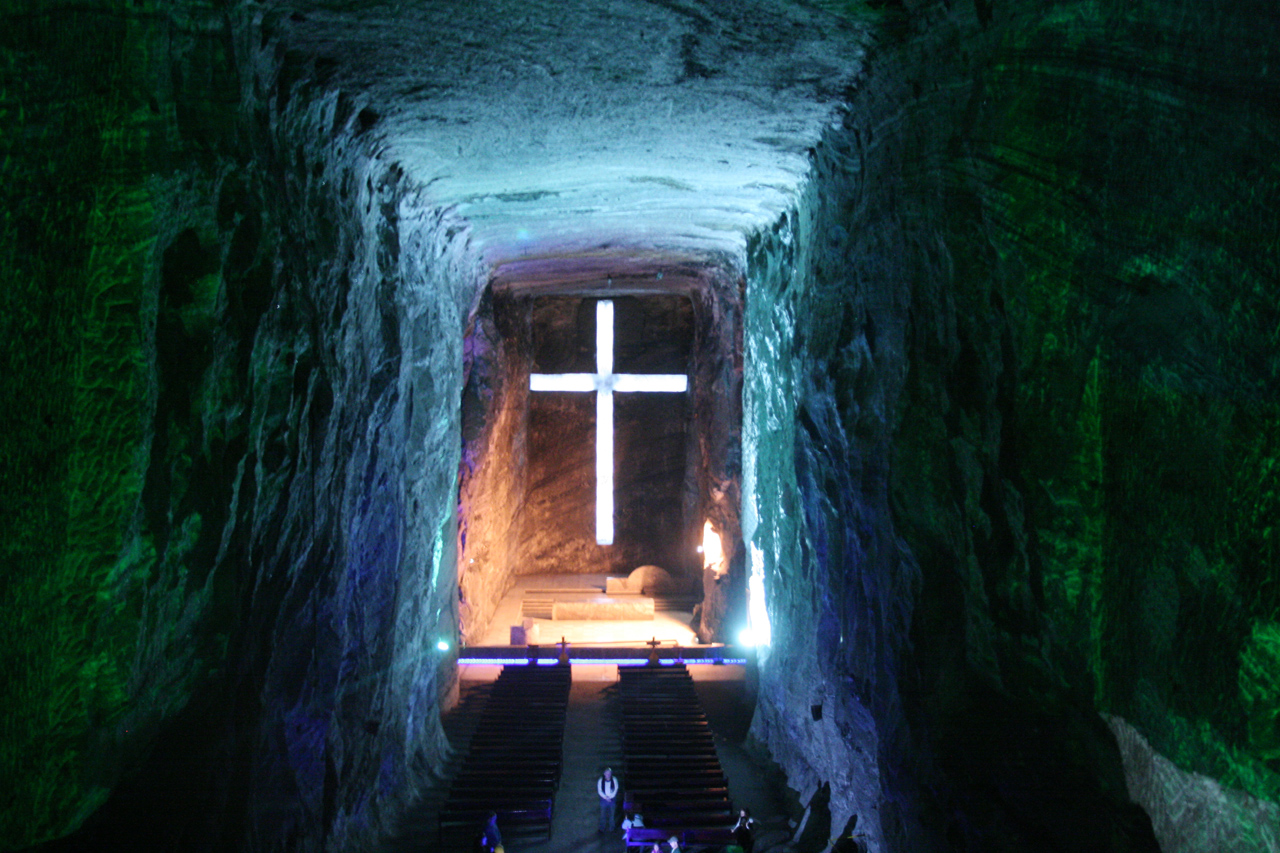
Salt Cathedral of Zipaquirá
Cundinamarca

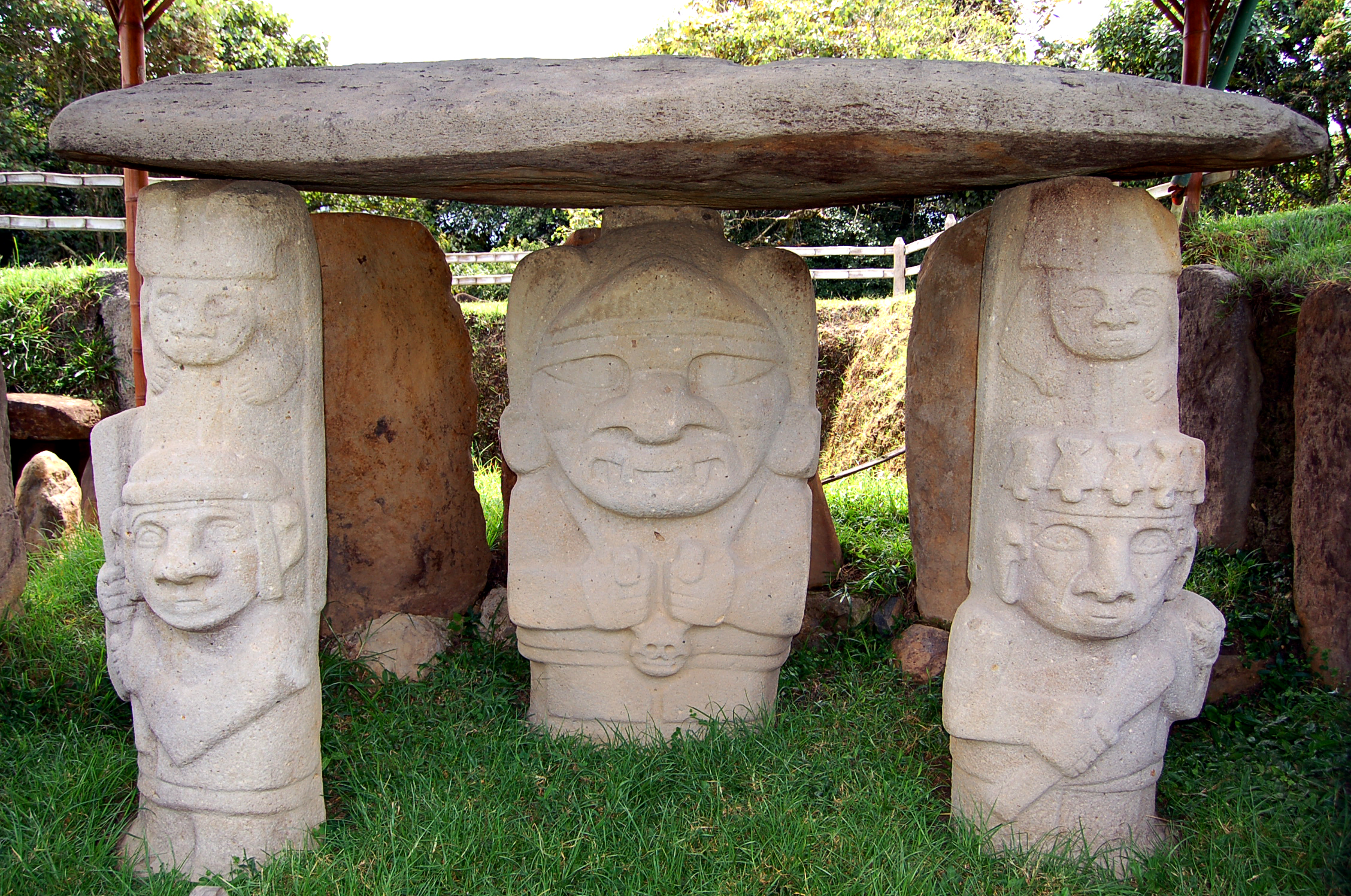
San Agustín
Huila

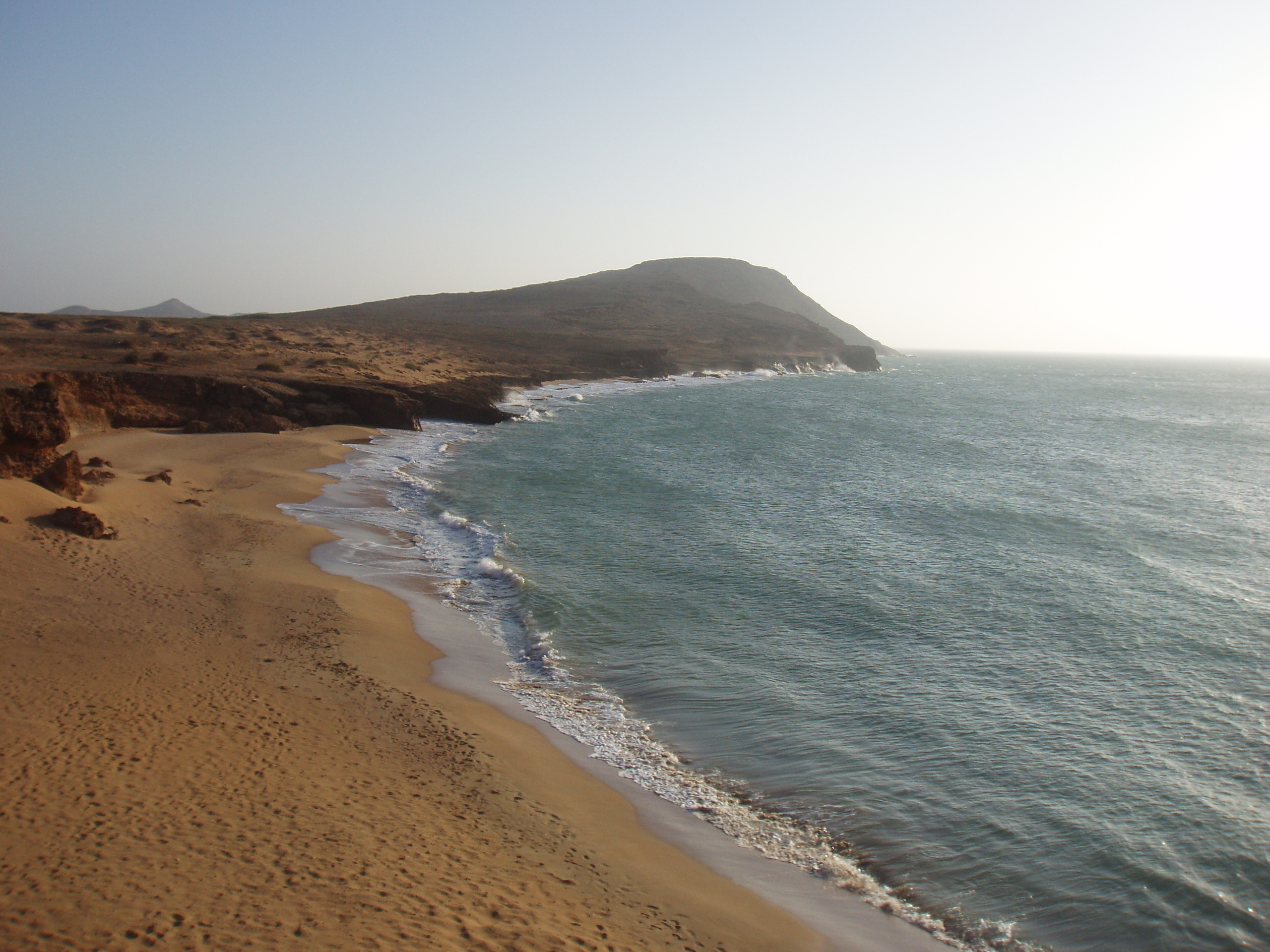
Cabo de la Vela or Cape of Sails
La Guajira

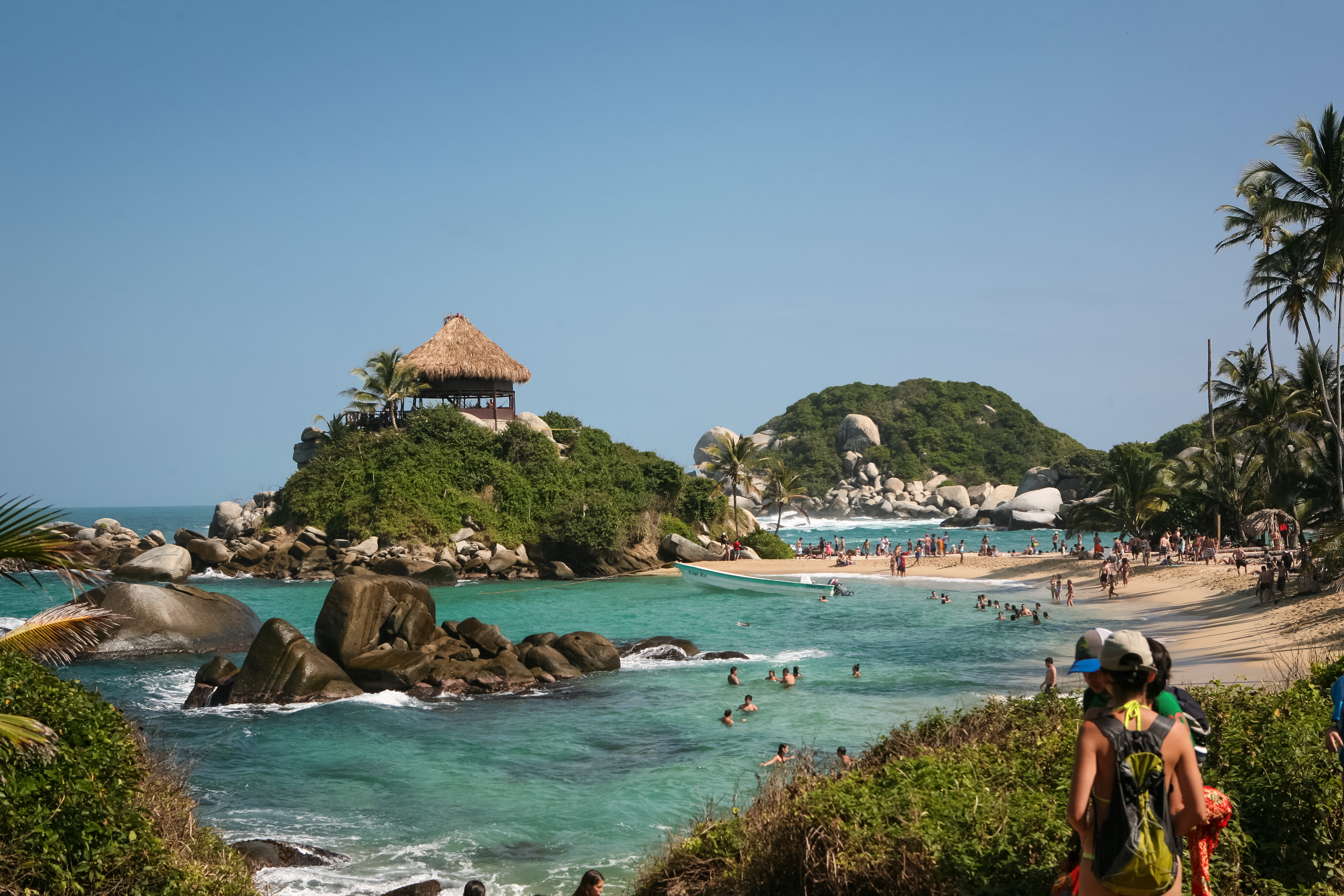
Cabo San Juan
Magdalena

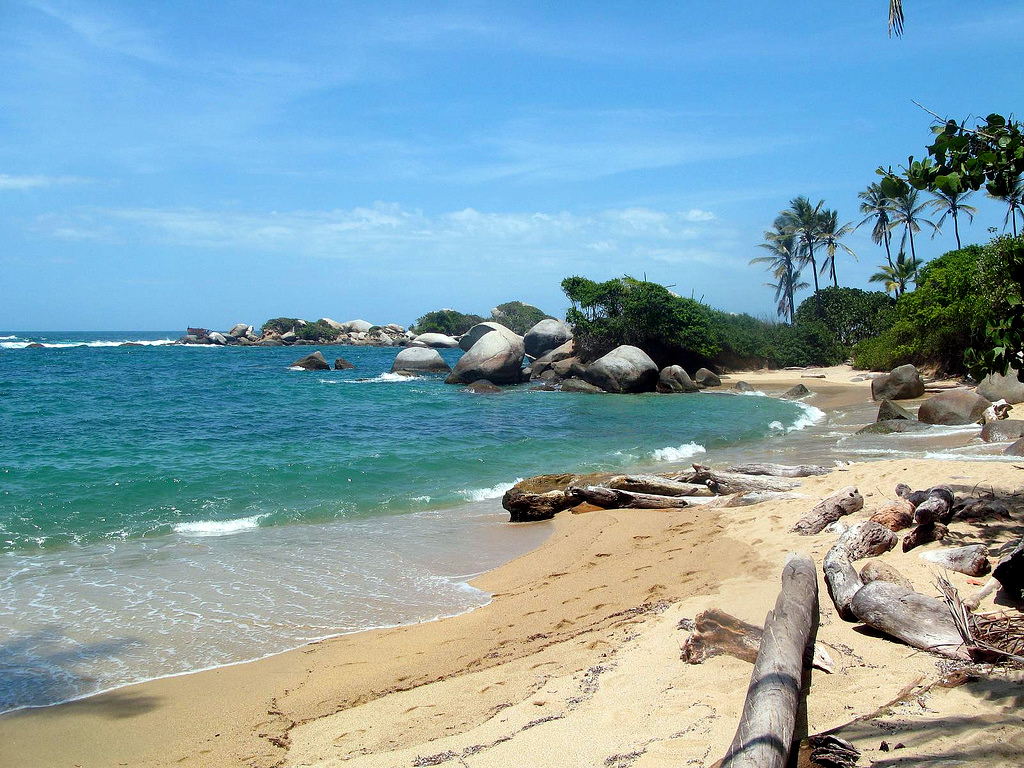
Park Tayrona
Magdalena

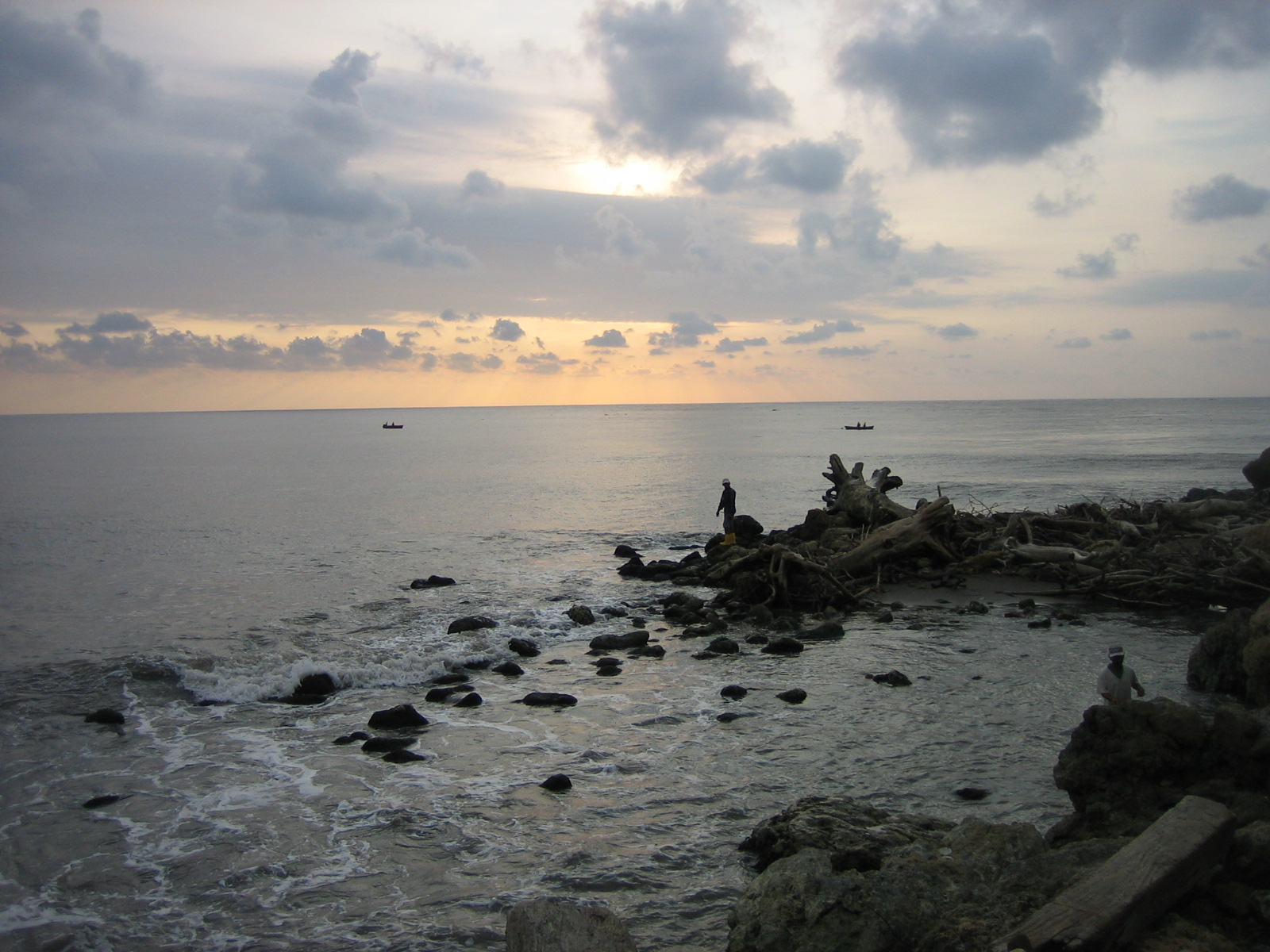
Bocas de Ceniza, Barranquilla
Atlántico

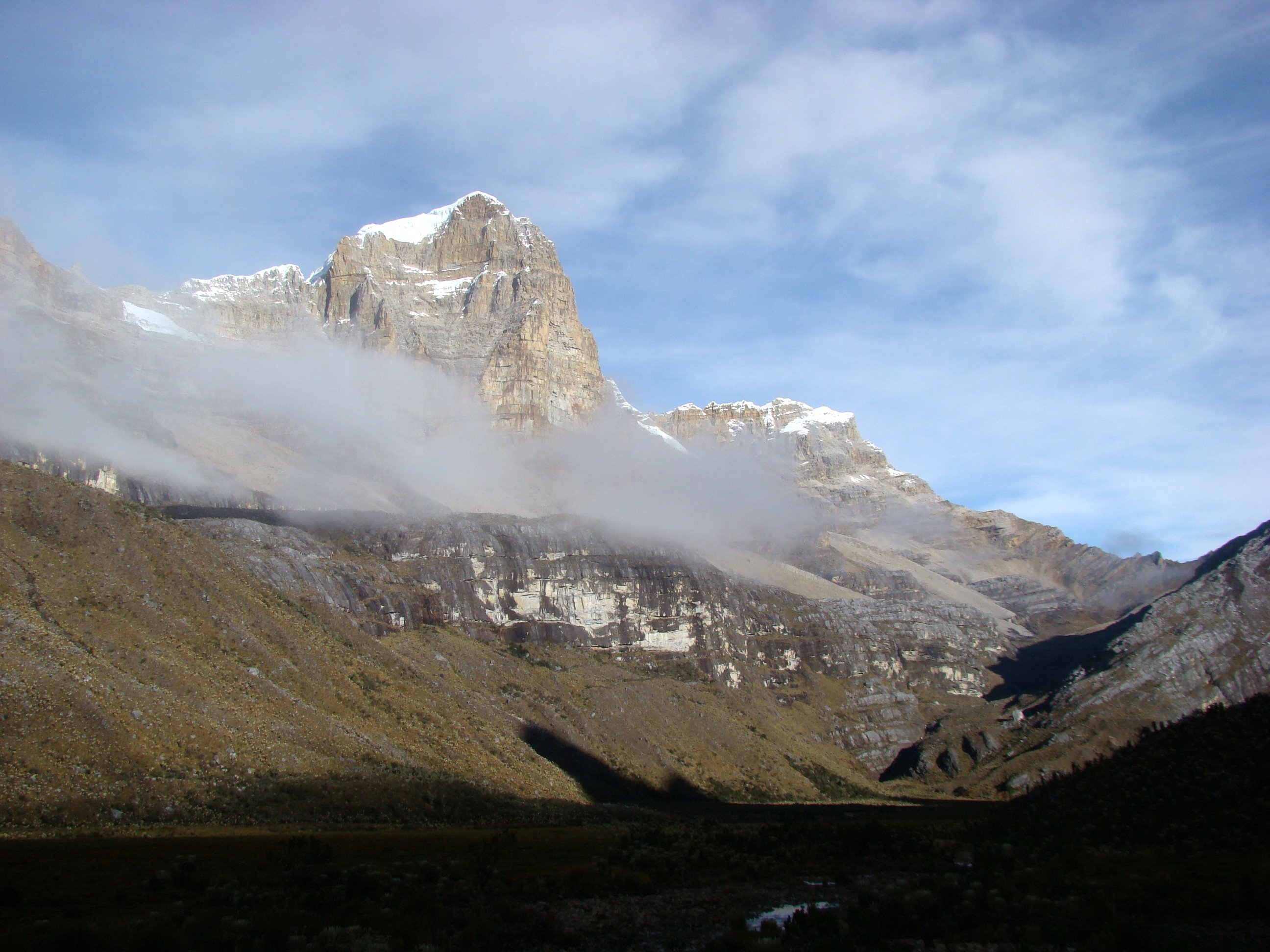
Sierra Nevada del Cocuy
Boyacá

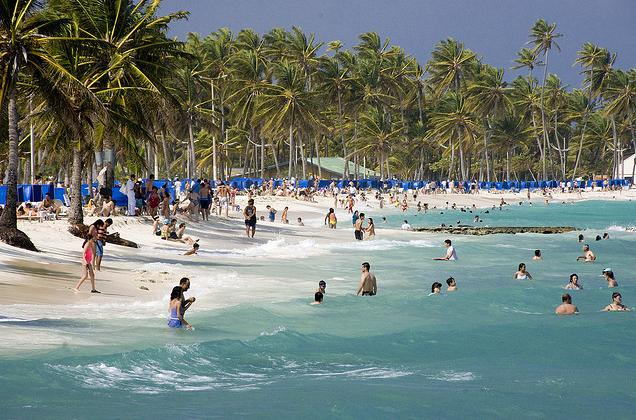
San Andrés Island
San Andrés y Providencia

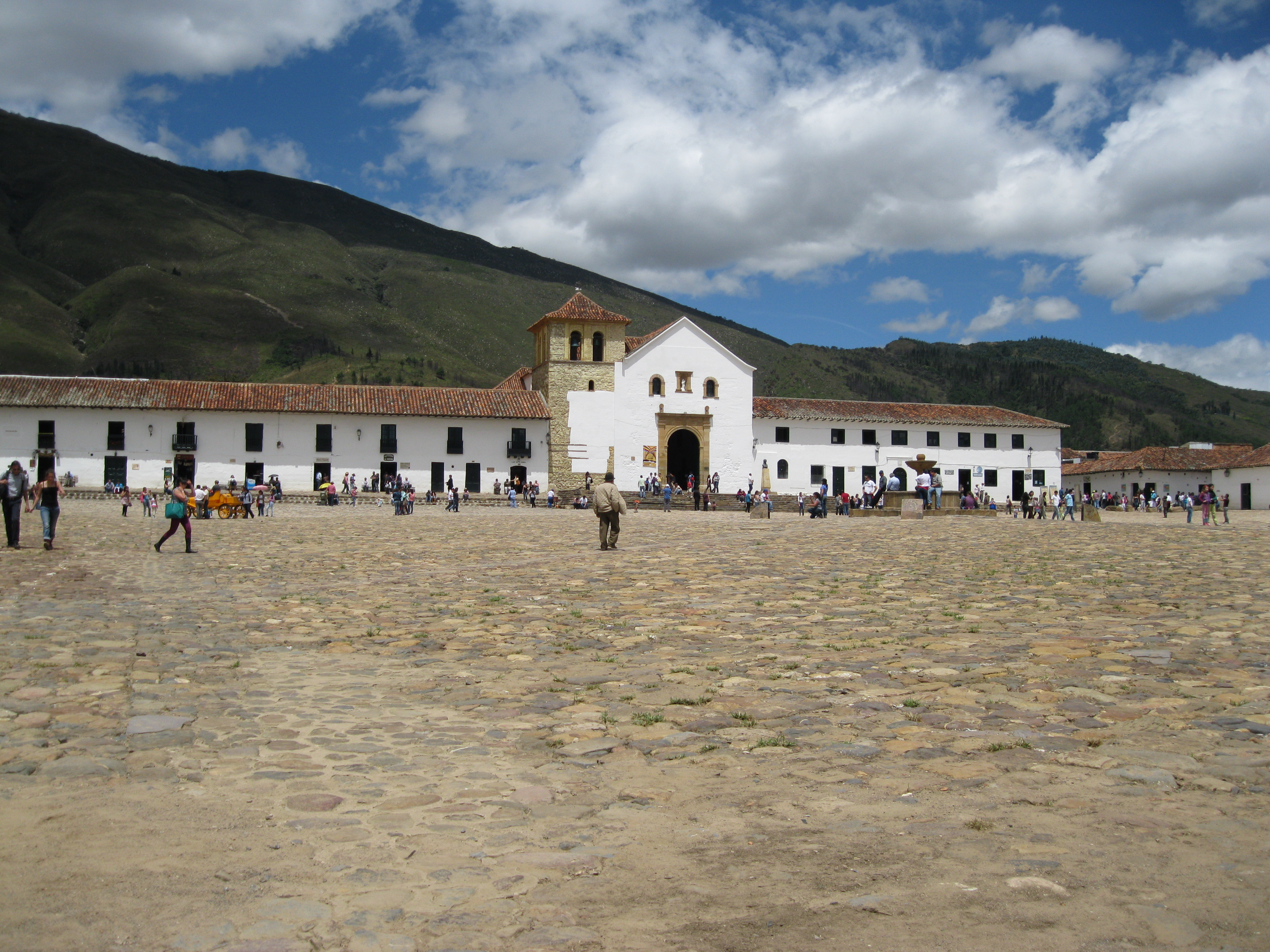
Villa de Leyva
Boyacá

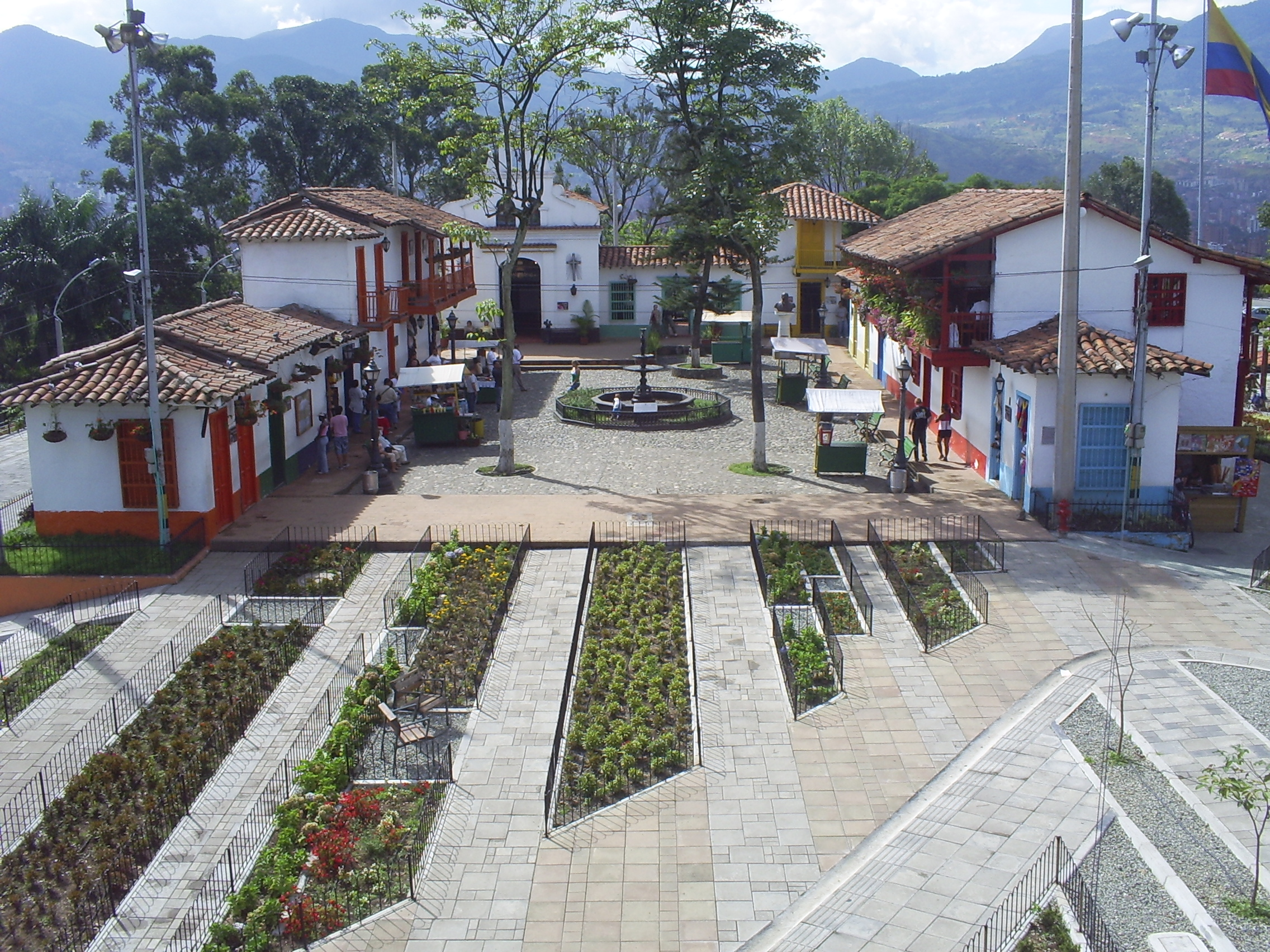
Pueblito Paisa, Medellín
Antioquia

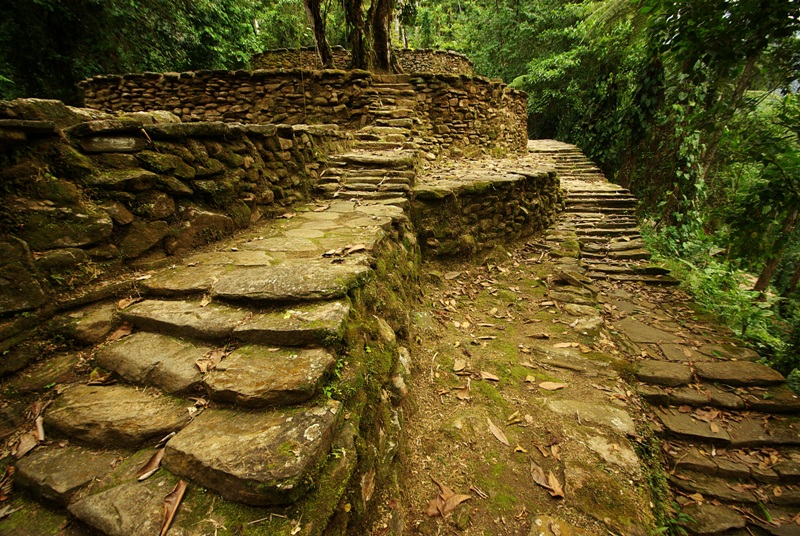
Ciudad Perdida
Magdalena

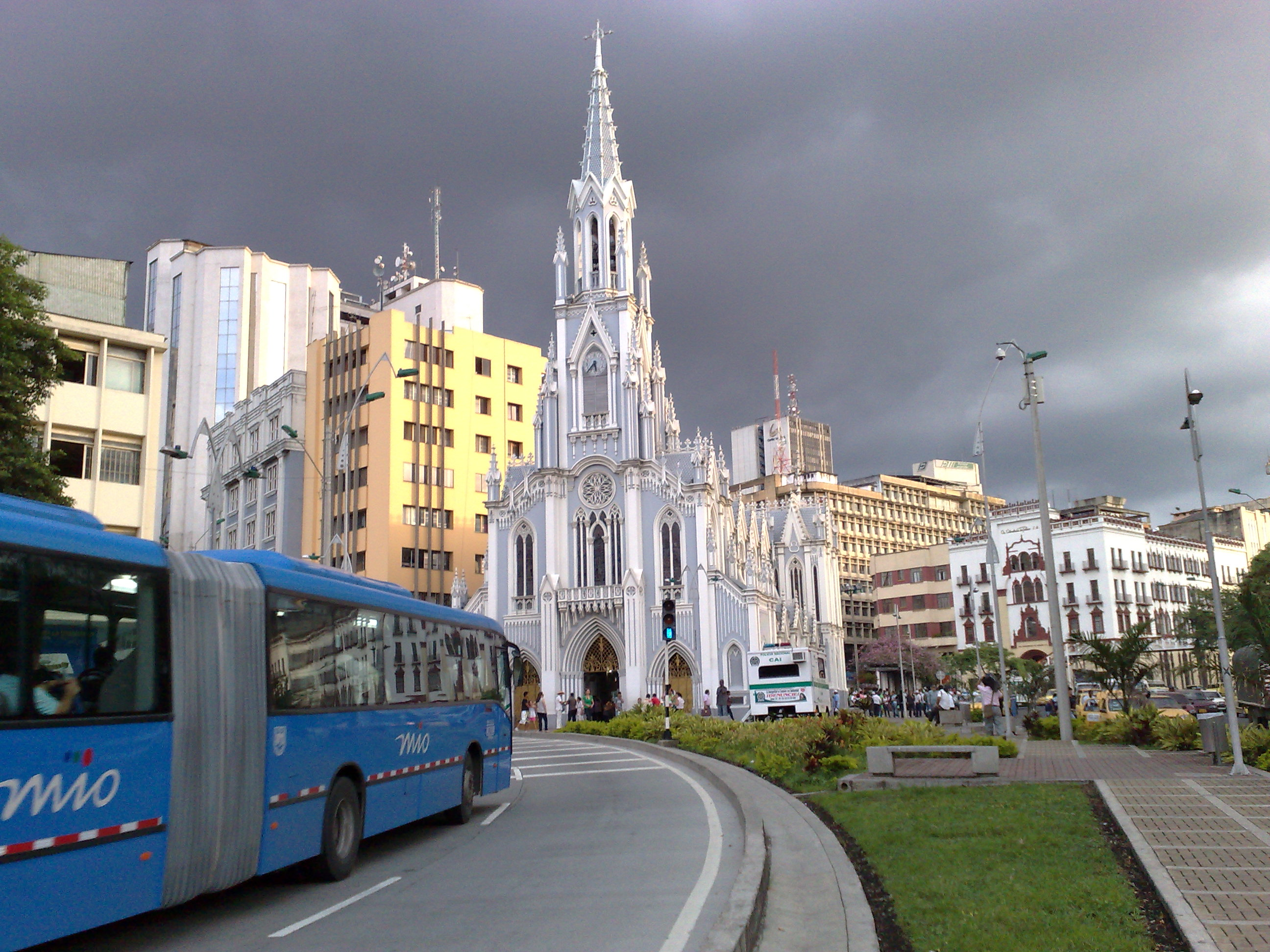
Cali
Valle del Cauca

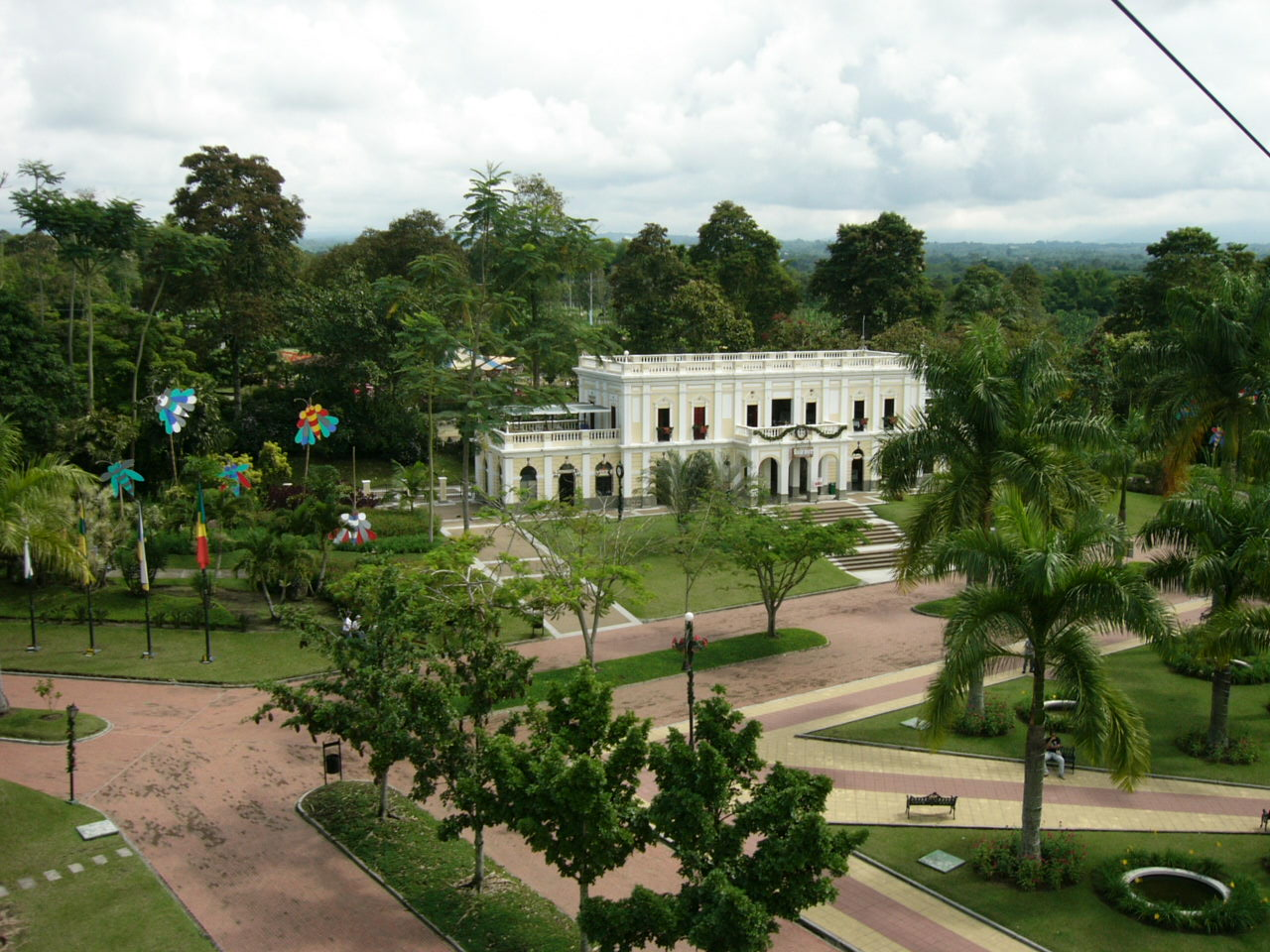
Colombian coffee growing axis
Quindío, Risaralda and Caldas

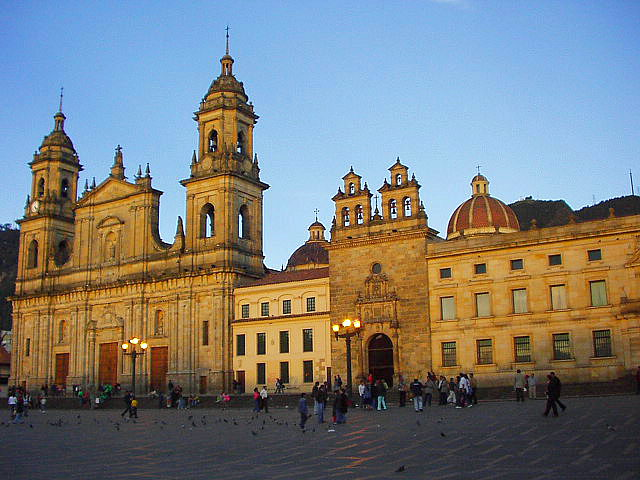
Bogotá
Cundinamarca

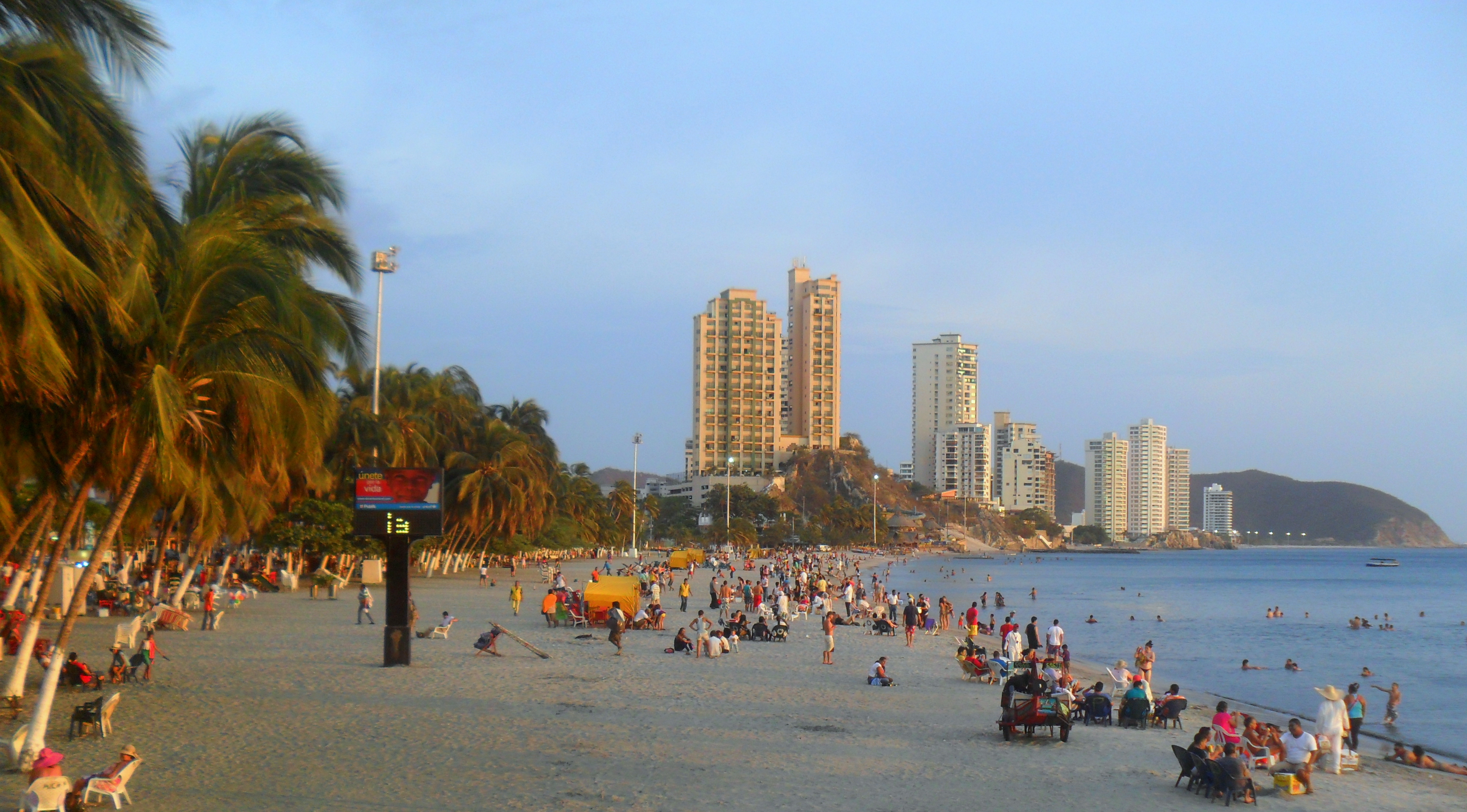
Santa Marta
Magdalena

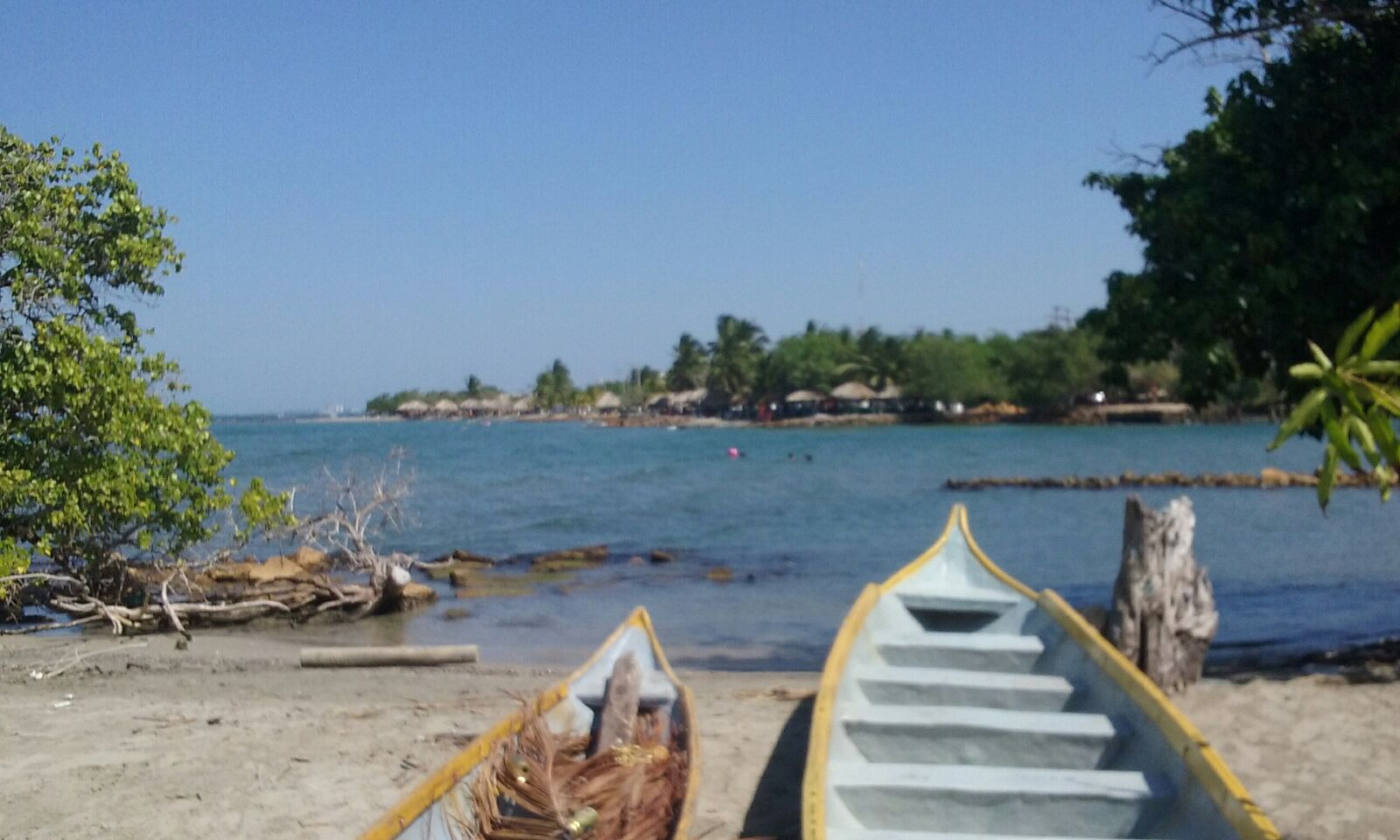
Coveñas, Sucre

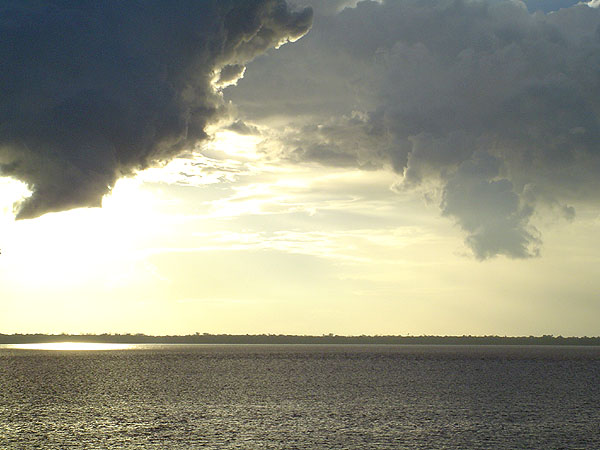
Amacayacu National Park
Amazonas

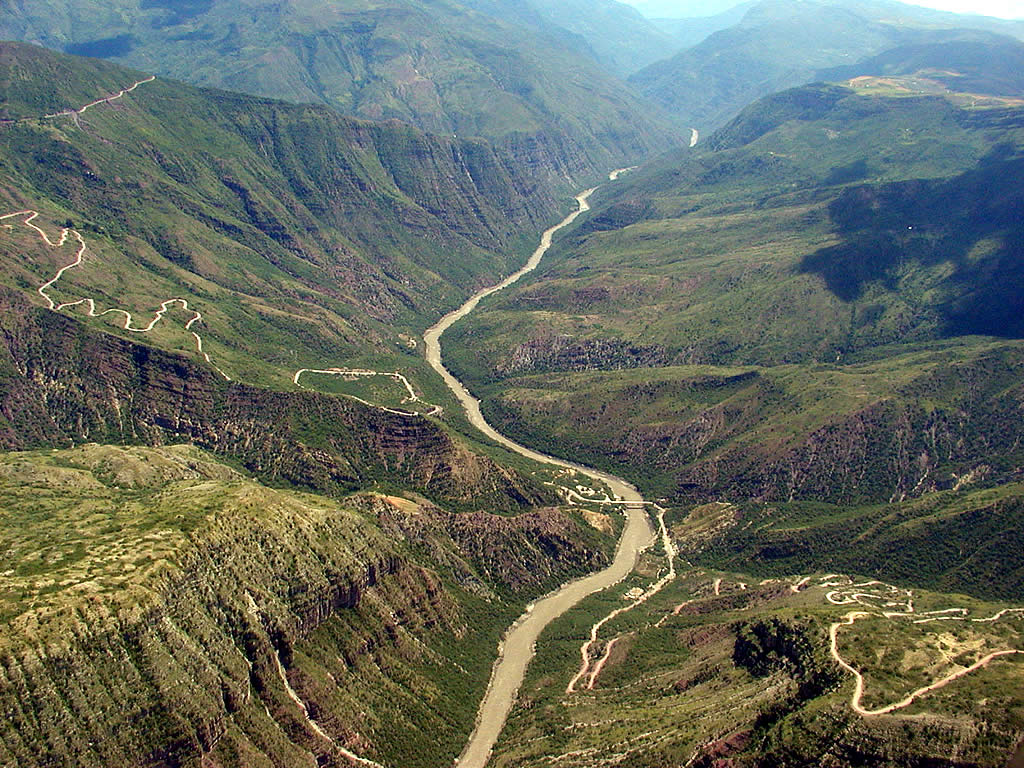
Chicamocha Canyon
Santander

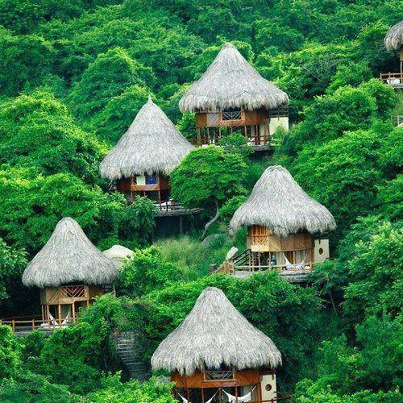
Indigenous huts in Sierra Nevada de Santa Marta
Cesar

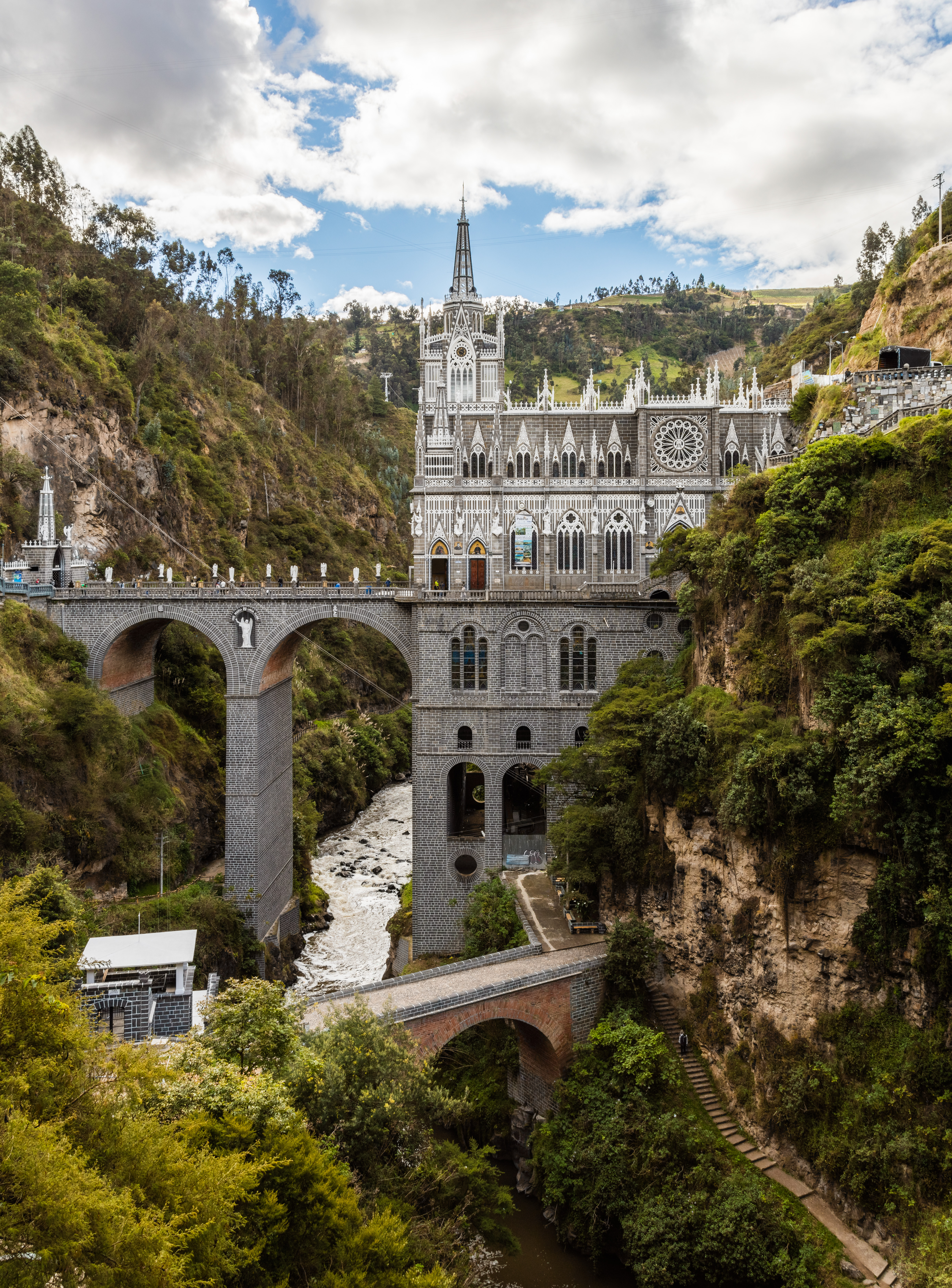
Las Lajas Sanctuary
Nariño

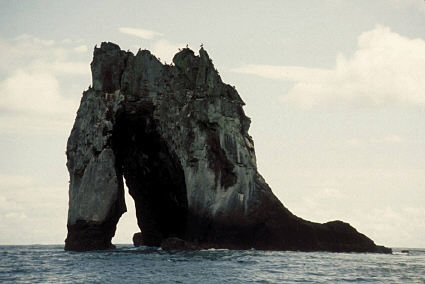
Gorgona Island
Cauca

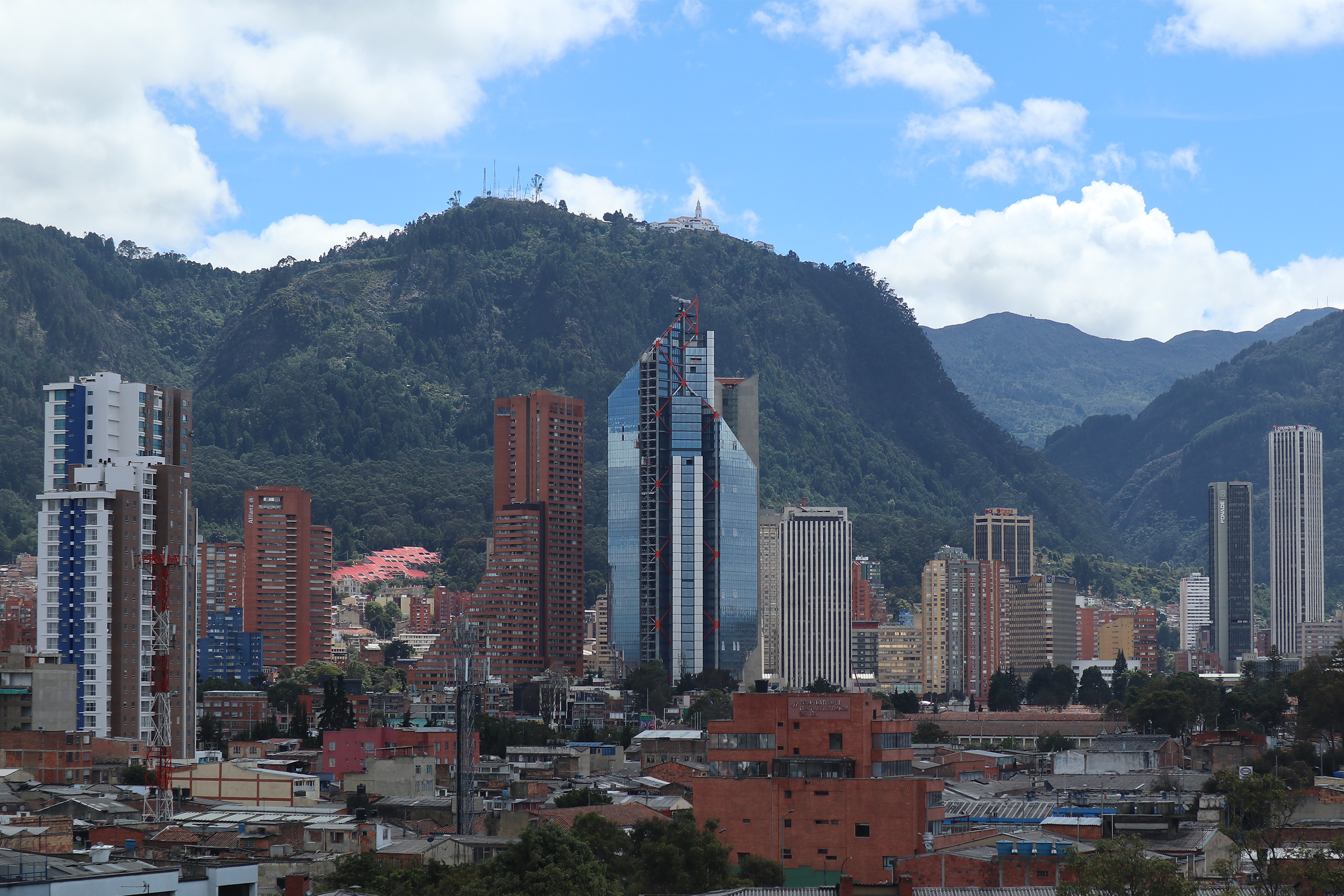
Bogotá Downtown

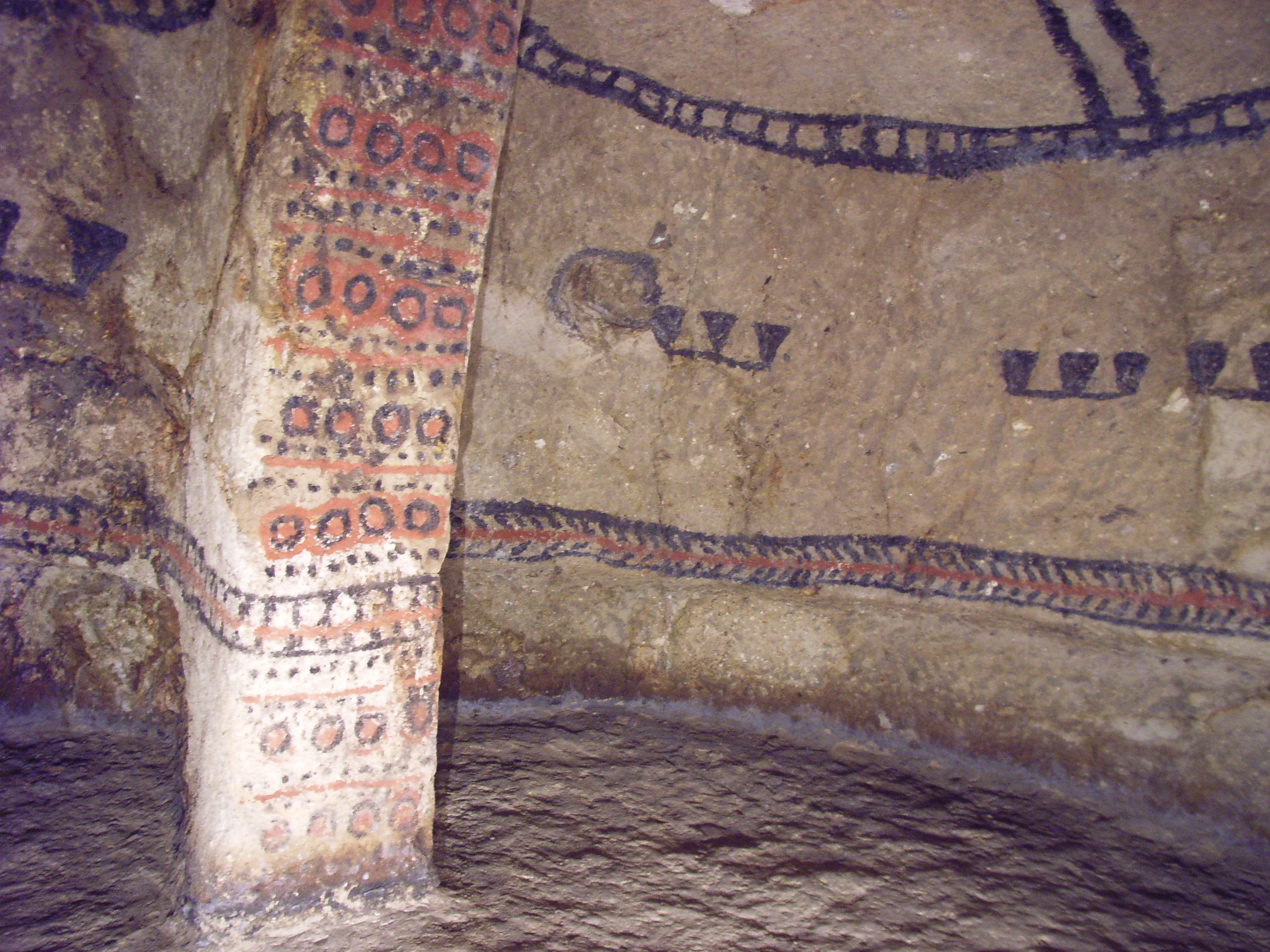
Archaeological Park of Tierradentro
Cauca

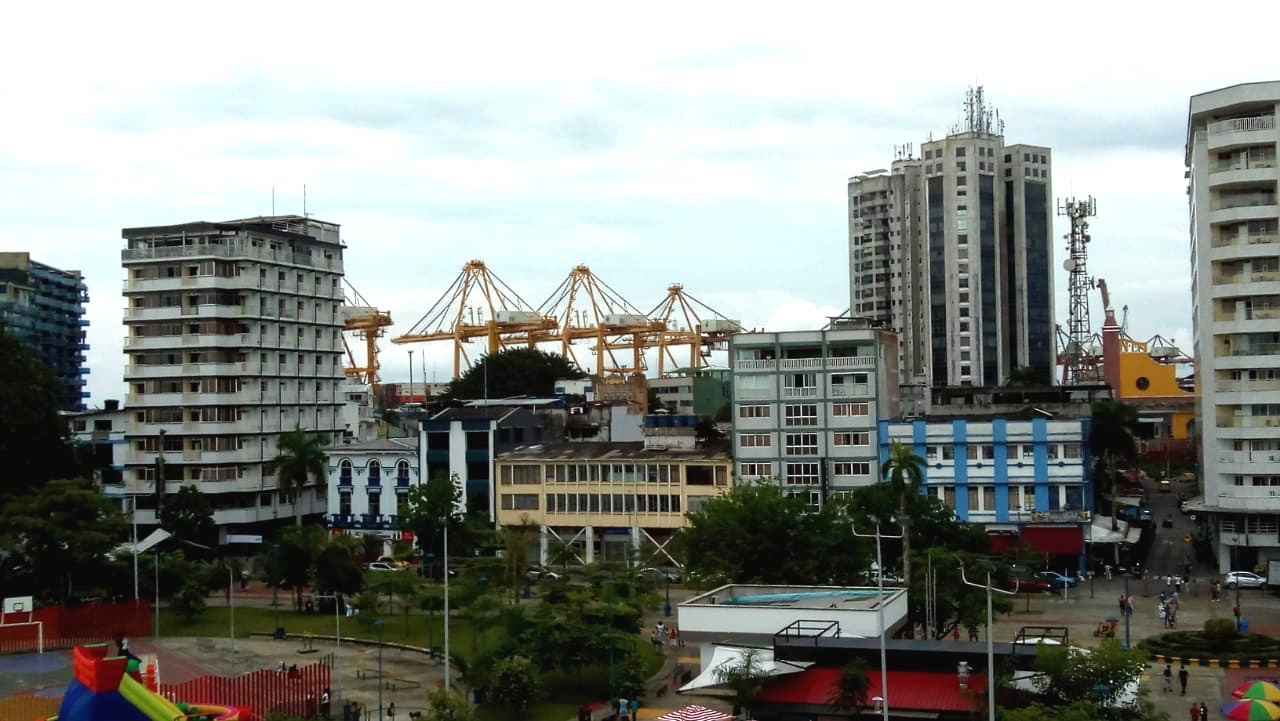
Port of Buenaventura

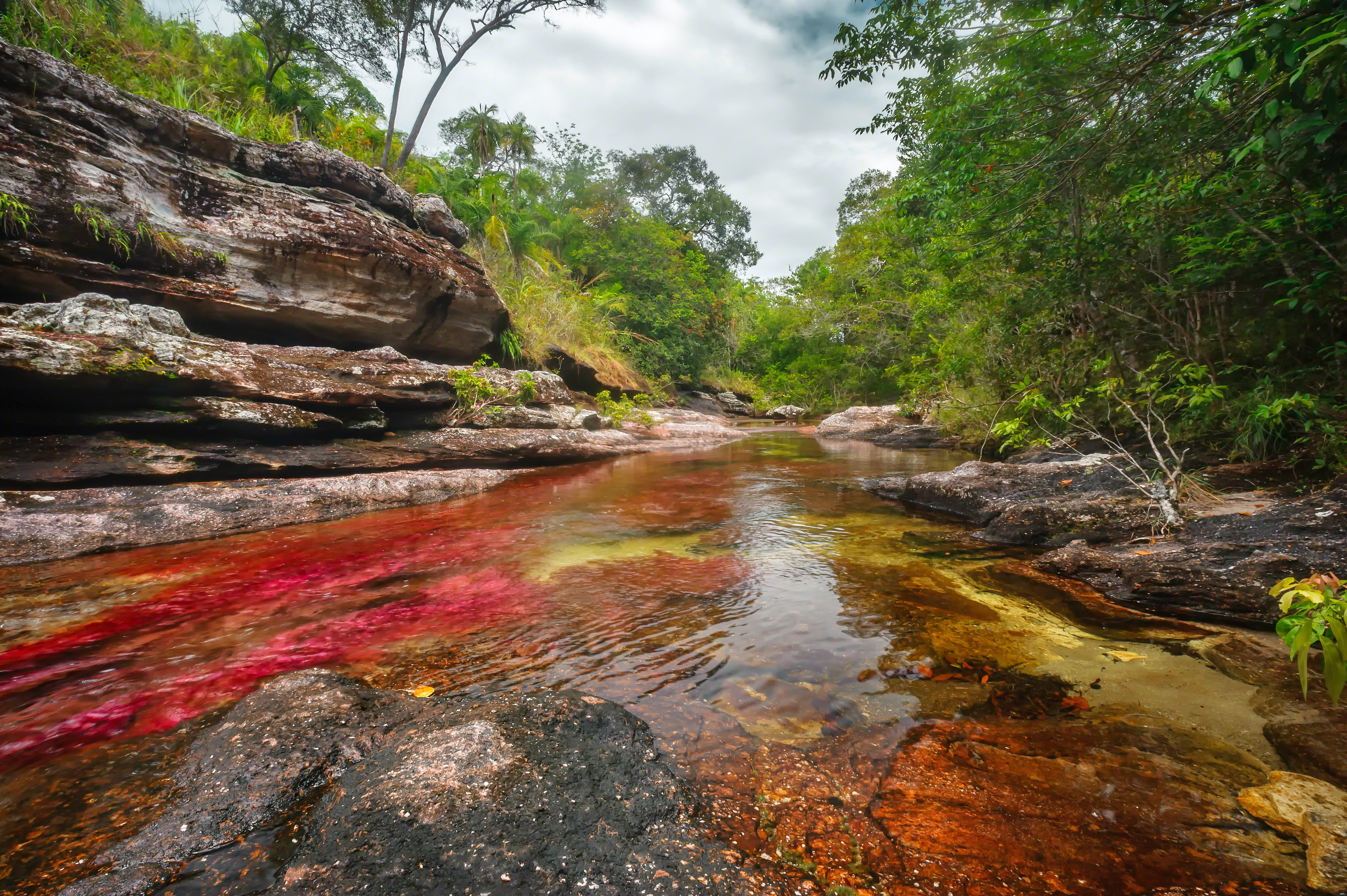
Caño Cristales
Meta

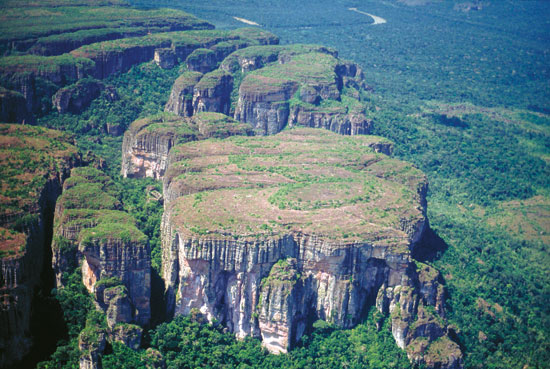
Chiribiquete National Park

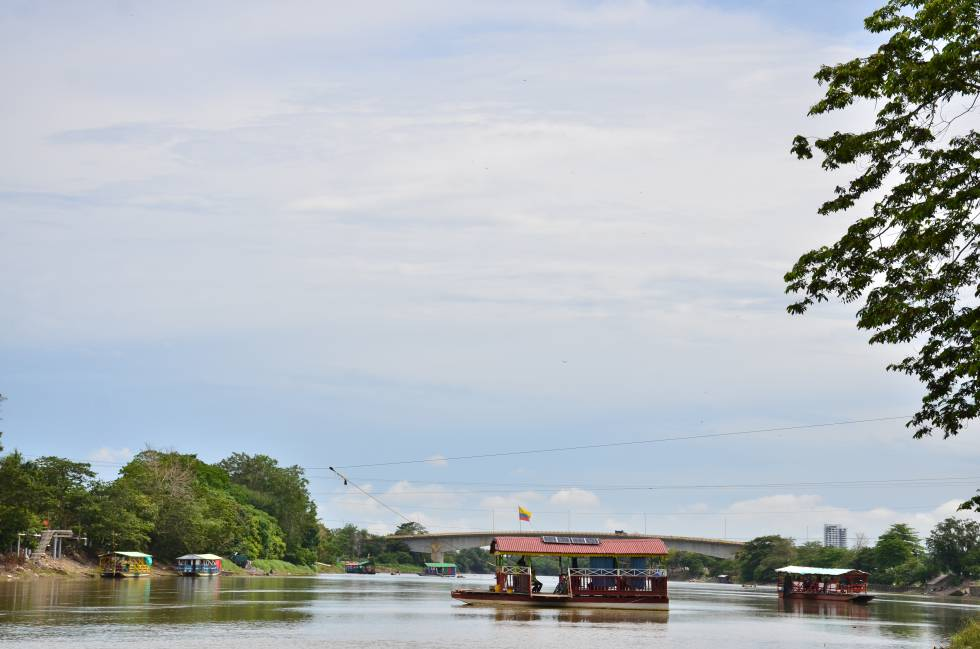
Montería
Córdoba

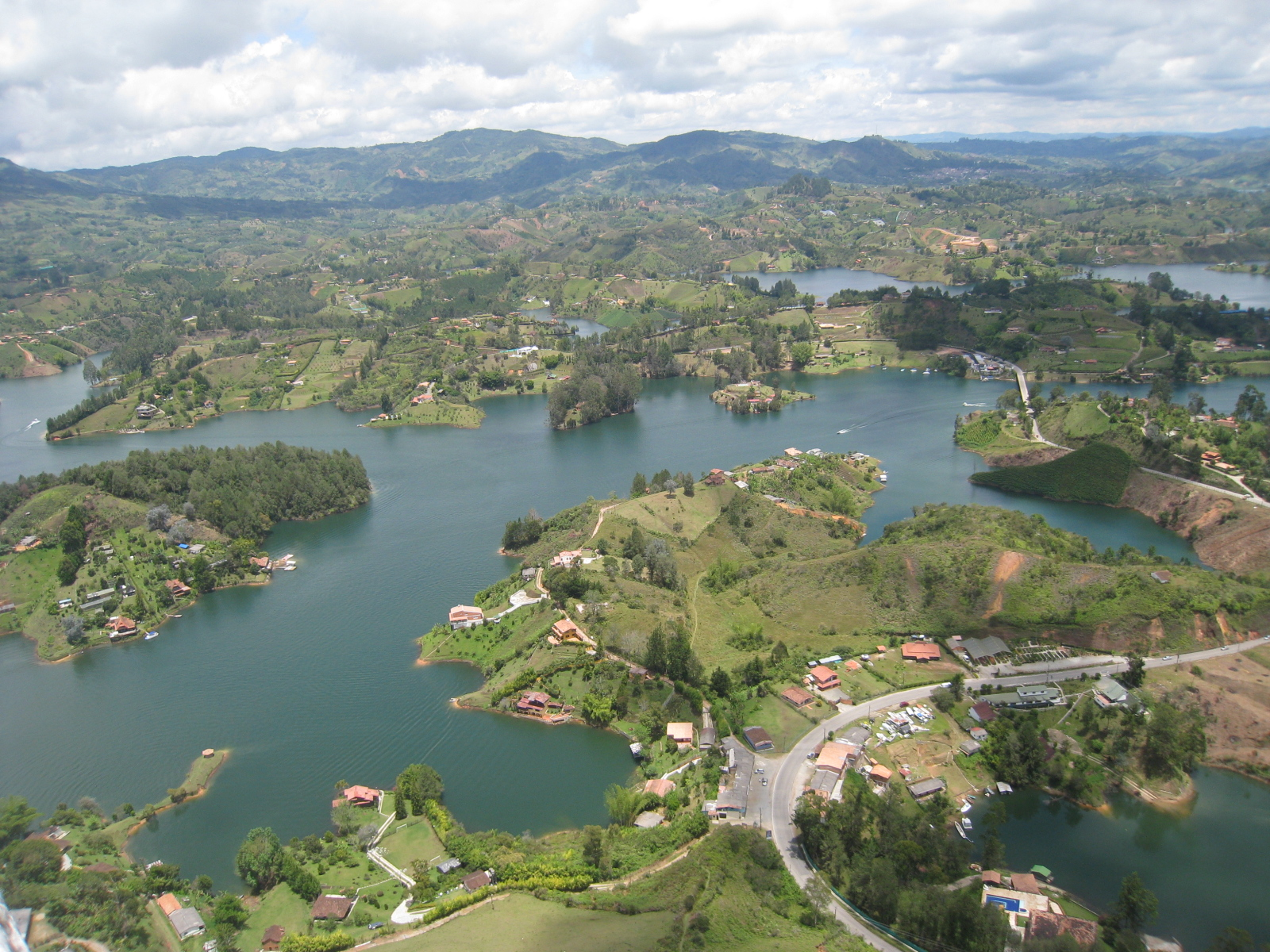
Guatapé, Antioquia

== See also ==
- Pueblos Patrimonio
- Seven Wonders of Colombia
- Visa policy of Colombia
- Jaime Duque Park
- List of World Heritage Sites in Colombia

== Bibliography ==
- Lipski, John M. (1994), Latin American Spanish, Longman, ISBN 978-0-582-08761-3
