= List of Intangible Cultural Heritage elements in Colombia =

Location of Colombia

The United Nations Educational, Scientific and Cultural Organization (UNESCO) defines intangible cultural heritage elements as non-physical traditions and practices performed by a people. As part of a country's cultural heritage, they include celebrations, festivals, performances, oral traditions, music, and the making of handicrafts. The term intangible cultural heritage is formally established by the Convention for the Safeguarding of the Intangible Cultural Heritage, which was drafted in 2003 and took effect in 2006. The inscription of new heritage elements on UNESCO's Intangible Cultural Heritage Lists for protection and safeguarding is determined by the Intergovernmental Committee for the Safeguarding of Intangible Cultural Heritage, an organization established by the convention. Colombia ratified the convention on 19 March 2008. It served on the Intangible Cultural Heritage Committee from 2016 to 2020.

National lists are required by the convention for the further nomination of elements to the UNESCO lists.

== Intangible Cultural Heritage of Humanity ==
UNESCO's Intangible Cultural Heritage of Humanity consists of three lists: the Representative List of the Intangible Cultural Heritage of Humanity, the List of Intangible Cultural Heritage in Need of Urgent Safeguarding, and the Register of Good Safeguarding Practices. Colombia has elements inscribed in the three lists.

† Transnational element

=== Representative List ===
This list aims to represent the intangible cultural heritage of Colombia worldwide and bring awareness to its significance.

Intangible Cultural Heritage elements recognized by UNESCO
Name	Media	Year	No.	Description
Cultural space of Palenque de San Basilio		2008	00102	
Carnival of Barranquilla		2008	00051	
Carnaval de Negros y Blancos		2009	00287	
Holy Week processions in Popayán		2009	00259	
Wayuu normative system, applied by the Pütchipü'üi (palabrero)		2010	00435	
Traditional knowledge of the jaguar shamans of Yuruparí		2011	00574	
Festival of Saint Francis of Assisi, Quibdó		2012	00640	
Marimba music, traditional chants and dances from the Colombia South Pacific region and Esmeraldas Province of Ecuador † (Note: Shared with Ecuador.)		2015	01099	
Ancestral system of knowledge of the four indigenous peoples, Arhuaco, Kankuamo, Kogui and Wiwa of the Sierra Nevada de Santa Marta		2022	01886	
Midwifery: knowledge, skills and practices † (Note: Shared with Cyprus, Germany, Kyrgyzstan, Luxembourg, Nigeria, Slovenia, and Togo.)		2023	01968	
Living pictures of Galeras, Sucre		2024	01887	

=== Need of Urgent Safeguarding ===
This list covers elements that are endangered and thus require appropriate safeguarding.

Endangered elements recognized by UNESCO
Name	Media	Year	No.	Description
Traditional Vallenato music of the Greater Magdalena region		2015	01095	
Colombian-Venezuelan llano work songs † (Note: Shared with Venezuela.)		2017	01285	
Traditional knowledge and techniques associated with Pasto Varnish mopa-mopa of Putumayo and Nariño		2020	01599	

=== Register of Good Safeguarding Practices ===
This list accredits programs and projects that safeguard intangible cultural heritage and express the principles of the convention.

Good Safeguarding Practices recognized by UNESCO
Name	Media	Year	No.	Description
Safeguarding strategy of traditional crafts for peace building		2019	01480	

== See also ==
- List of World Heritage Sites in Colombia
- Culture of Colombia
- Tourism in Colombia
