= Seven Wonders of Colombia =

The Seven Wonders of Colombia (Spanish: Siete maravillas de Colombia) was a 2007 competition sponsored by El Tiempo. The newspaper asked readers to nominate and vote for man-made structures whose engineering, architectural or historical value deserved special recognition.

== El Tiempo's Seven Wonders of Colombia ==
Image	Nominee	Location	Number of votes
	Salt Cathedral of Zipaquirá; Catedral de Sal de Zipaquirá	Zipaquirá, Cundinamarca	6,654
	Las Lajas Sanctuary; Santuario de Las Lajas	Ipiales, Nariño	5,057
	San Agustín Archaeological Park; Parque Arqueológico San Agustín	San Agustín, Huila	4,680
	San Felipe de Barajas Castle; Castillo San Felipe de Barajas	Cartagena, Bolívar	4,389
	Ciudad Perdida	Sierra Nevada de Santa Marta, Magdalena	4,373
	Tierradentro	Inza, Cauca	2,787
	Teatro de Cristóbal Colón	Bogotá	2,785

== Other finalists ==
- Quinta de San Pedro Alejandrino – 2,783
- Zenú Waterworks in Mompox Depression – 2,661
- Villa de Leyva's Main Square – 2,598
- Puente de Occidente in Santa Fe de Antioquia – 2,476
- Santa Bárbara Church in Santa Cruz de Mompox – 2,057
- Puerto Colombia's Pier – 1,943
- National Museum of Colombia's Building – 1,915
- Bolívar Square – 1,894
- Ecce Homo Convent, Sutamarchán – 1,849
- Barichara's Main Square – 1,822
- La Quiebra Tunnel – 1,782
- Capitolio Nacional – 1,626
- Metropolitan Cathedral of Medellín – 1,624
- Museum of Antioquia's Building – 1,191
