= List of World Heritage Sites in Colombia =

Location of World Heritage Sites in Colombia. Red dots represent cultural sites, green dots natural sites, and blue dots mixed sites. Purple dots indicate the sites of the Coffee Cultural Landscape. Orange dots are the sites of the Qhapaq Ñan.

The United Nations Educational, Scientific and Cultural Organization (UNESCO) World Heritage Sites are places of importance to cultural or natural heritage as described in the UNESCO World Heritage Convention, established in 1972. Cultural heritage consists of monuments (such as architectural works, monumental sculptures, or inscriptions), groups of buildings, and sites (including archaeological sites). Natural heritage consists of natural features (physical and biological formations), geological and physiographical formations (including habitats of threatened species of animals and plants), and natural sites which are important from the point of view of science, conservation, or natural beauty. Colombia accepted the convention on 24 May 1983, making its historical sites eligible for inclusion on the list.

There are nine World Heritage Sites in Colombia, including six cultural sites, two natural sites and one mixed site. The first site in Colombia, Port, Fortresses and Group of Monuments, Cartagena, was inscribed on the list at the 8th Session of the World Heritage Committee, held in Buenos Aires, Argentina, in 1984. Los Katíos National Park was inscribed as the first natural site in 1994. In 2009, the site was listed as endangered, after a request by the Colombian government because of illegal deforestation and overfishing. The situation improved by 2015, so the site was no longer listed as endangered. Chiribiquete National Park – "The Maloca of the Jaguar" was added to the list in 2018 as Colombia's most recent inscription. Qhapaq Ñan, Andean Road System, is a transnational site and is shared with five other countries. Colombia has a further 13 sites on its tentative list. The country has served on the World Heritage Committee three times.

== World Heritage Sites ==
UNESCO lists sites under ten criteria; each entry must meet at least one of the criteria. Criteria i through vi are cultural, and vii through x are natural.

* Transnational site

World Heritage Sites
Site	Image	Location (department)	Year listed	UNESCO data	Description
Port, Fortresses and Group of Monuments, Cartagena	A fortress on the top of the hill	Bolívar	1984	285; iii (cultural)	Cartagena features the most extensive and one of the most complete fortification systems in South America and is a prominent example of the military architecture of the 16th, 17th, and 18th centuries. Initial defences were built by the Spanish in 1586 and gradually expanded, protecting one of the most important ports of the Caribbean Sea. There are numerous fortresses around the city. Within the walls, there are churches, palaces, and residences for the wealthy citizens.
Los Katíos National Park	River and flooded plains from above	Antioquia, Chocó	1994	711; ix, x (natural)	The national park is located in the Darién Gap and is contiguous with the Darién National Park in Panama. The Great American Interchange of animals took place through this area in late Cenozoic. It was also likely a refugium during the Pleistocene, which is indicated by a high number of endemic species. The habitats include the Chocó–Darién moist forests and wetlands. The floodplains of the Atrato River are pictured. The park is home to the American crocodile, giant anteater, and Baird's tapir. In 2009, the site was listed as endangered upon a request by the Colombian government because of illegal deforestation and overfishing. The situation has improved by 2015 so the site was removed from the list.
Historic Centre of Santa Cruz de Mompox	Church with elaborate designs on the facade	Bolívar	1995	742; iv, v (cultural)	Santa Cruz de Mompox was founded by the Spanish in 1540, as a river port on the banks of the Magdalena River. It developed along the main street that runs parallel to the river and also acts as a dyke during floods. The city played a major role in the colonization of the region but declined in importance in the 19th century. The historical centre is well preserved, with numerous buildings featuring decorated portals, balcons, and galleries. The Santa Barbara Church is pictured.
National Archeological Park of Tierradentro	Interior of an underground tomb with walls painted with geometric patterns	Cauca	1995	743; iii (cultural)	The archaeological park, comprising four nearby areas, contains numerous hypogea, underground chambers that were used as tombs. They were created roughly between 600 and 900 CE. The largest of them are up to 12 m (39 ft) wide. The tombs often feature polychrome paintings with geometric designs, animal and human motifs, and stone carvings. The architecture of the tombs intended to resemble human dwellings. There are also several monumental human statues, carved in volcanic stone, in the park.
San Agustín Archaeological Park	Three anthropomorphic statues serving as pillars for a tomb	Huila	1995	744; iii (cultural)	The archaeological park comprises three areas with remains of the San Agustín culture. The main monuments date to the Regional Classic period (1-900 AD) and include burial mounds, terraces, funerary structures, and monumental stone statues. The statues at Mesita B are pictured.
Malpelo Fauna and Flora Sanctuary	A rocky island in the ocean	Valle del Cauca	2006	1216; vii, ix (natural)	The site comprises the Malpelo Island, an isolated island around 500 km (310 mi) off the mainland, and the surrounding waters. The island and its rocky outcrops are home to populations of the Nazca booby, swallow-tailed gull, and Galápagos petrel. The nutrient-rich waters support a wide variety of marine life: including large aggregations of pelagic fish species and large predators, such as the hammerhead shark and silky shark. The area is designated as a no-fishing zone.
Coffee Cultural Landscape of Colombia	Hills with coffee plantations	Caldas, Quindío, Risaralda	2011	1121; v, vi (cultural)	Colombia is known for its coffee production. The site comprises six areas with coffee plantations and several urban centres. Cultivation of coffee on steep mountain slopes on small plots in a high forest has resulted in a specific cultural landscape with settlements located on the flat tops and buildings made of cob and pleated cane. The architecture reflects the mixture of the Spanish architectural influences with those of the people from the Antioquia Department, who settled in the area in the 19th century. There are several expressions of intangible cultural heritage, including the traditional sombrero aguadeño hats and raw hide shoulder bags.
Qhapaq Ñan, Andean Road System*	Paved path in the mountains	several sites	2014	1459; ii, iii, iv, vi (cultural)	Qhapaq Ñan is an extensive pre-Incan and Incan road system, spanning over 30,000 km (19,000 mi) across the Andes. The roads connect high mountain peaks with rainforests, coasts, valleys, and deserts. The road system formed the lifeline of the Inca Empire, allowing transport and exchange of goods, as well as movement of messengers, travelers, and even armies. The site comprises 273 components featuring structures such as roads, bridges, ditches, and supporting infrastructure, nine of which are in Colombia. The site is shared with Argentina (a section pictured), Bolivia, Chile, Ecuador, and Peru.
Chiribiquete National Park – "The Maloca of the Jaguar"	Several tepui, elevated mountains with flat tops, and rainforest at the bottom	Caquetá, Guaviare	2018	1174; iii, ix, x (mixed)	The national park is located at the meeting point of the Andes, Amazon, Guayana, and the Orinoco biomes, which results in high levels of biodiversity, numerous endemic species, and it also allows for species to transit between the regions. Large animals include the jaguar, giant otter, giant anteater, and South American tapir. There are numerous tepuis (table-top mountains, example pictured) in the park. Some of them have rock shelters where people were creating rock art through millennia. The paintings include dances, battles, and ceremonies, as well as plants and animals. The indigenous communities consider these sites as sacred.

== Tentative list ==
In addition to sites inscribed on the World Heritage List, member states can maintain a list of tentative sites that they may consider for nomination. Nominations for the World Heritage List are only accepted if the site was previously listed on the tentative list. Colombia has 13 properties on its tentative list.

Tentative sites
Site	Image	Location (department)	Year listed	UNESCO criteria	Description
Seaflower Marine Protected Area (MPA)	Satellite image of an island	Archipelago of San Andrés, Providencia and Santa Catalina	2007	ix, x (natural)	The largest marine protected area in the Caribbean comprises land and waters around San Andrés (satellite image pictured) and Providencia and Santa Catalina Islands. Habitats include mangroves, dry forests, lagoons, atolls, seagrass meadows, beaches, extensive coral reefs, and deep waters. There is a colony of magnificent frigatebirds nesting on the islands.
Canal del Dique - Dike Canal	Sunset over the river channel. Lush vegetation on both sides.	Atlántico, Bolívar, Sucre	2012	i, iv (cultural)	The canal connects Cartagena, Colombia's main port; with the Magdalena River, country's main river. However, the Magdalena River delta is not navigable due to obstacles. The first canal was built by the Spanish in 1582 but quickly fell out of use because of lack of maintenance. The next building stage took place in 1650 and was considered an engineering challenge due to its scale. It allowed development of the interior of the country and of several settlements along the canal.
University City of Bogotá	University buildings with a mural depicting Che Guevara	Bogotá	2012	i, iv (cultural)	The university campus of National University of Colombia was created in 1936 by teacher Fritz Karsen and architect Leopoldo Rother who developed the architectural and urban plan. The project represented the first such campus in Latin America and a driver of modern architecture in the country. It was influential in the design of campuses in several other countries, including the Venezuelan World Heritage Site of the University City of Caracas. León de Greiff Auditorium is pictured.
Pre-Hispanic Hydraulic System of the San Jorge River		Bolivar, Córdoba, Sucre	2012	iii, iv, v (cultural)	Momposina Depression is flooded most of the year, except during the dry season from November to March. The area has been inhabited for at least ten millennia by different communities, including the Zenú people. Flooding makes the soil fertile and attractive for agriculture, however, to establish permanent settlements, societies needed to construct extensive networks of drainage canals, terraces, and ridges. There are also remains of ceramics, gold smithing, and burial mounds. After the arrival of the Spanish, the water works were gradually abandoned.
Tayrona and Sierra Nevada de Santa Marta National Parks and their Archaeological Sites	Ruins of an ancient city with stone terraces	Cesar, La Guajira, Magdalena	2012	iii, iv, v, viii (mixed)	Sierra Nevada de Santa Marta is an isolated mountain range with the foot at the coast and the highest peak reaching 5,770 m (18,930 ft). This creates different habitat types, such as marine and coastal ecosystems, mangroves, and different types of forests on the mountain slopes. They support various flora and fauna. There are numerous archaeological sites in the area, several of them belonging to the Tairona culture between the 5th and 9th centuries. Pre-Hispanic cultures constructed terraces, canals, and roads. Major sites include the Ciudad Perdida (pictured) and Bahía de Cinto.
Catholic Doctrine Temples		Cauca	2012	ii, iv (cultural)	The Spanish permanently settled in what is now the Cauca Department only in the late 18th century, following a strong resistance by the indigenous communities. As a part of the evangelization and colonization process, they constructed twelve temples, seven of which still remain today. They are made of timber and earth and represent an example of religious syncretism with Spanish building styles and local construction techniques.
United Fruit Company Infrastructure		Magdalena	2012	iv, vi (cultural)	In the first decades of the 20th century, the multinational United Fruit Company transformed large areas in the Zona Bananera for the purpose of production of bananas. They cleared forests to set plantations, built towns and villages for workers, and constructed railroads. The life on plantations inspired the works of Gabriel García Márquez, the workers strike and the subsequent Banana Massacre in 1928 were the basis for the climax of his novel One Hundred Years of Solitude.
South of Ricaurte Province	A lake surrounded by hills with sparse vegetation	Boyacá	2012	ii, iii, viii, x (mixed)	The Iguaque Flora and Fauna Sanctuary (Lake Iguaque pictured) is located in the mountains between the elevations 2,400 m (7,900 ft) and 3,800 m (12,500 ft). It is one of the few places with the páramo ecosystem, a mountain ecosystem above the forest line but below the permanent snow line. Fossils of marine organisms from the Cretaceous period were found here, as before the emergence of the Andes mountains, there was a sea. The area has a spiritual significance to the Muisca people and there are several archaeological sites, including an astronomical observatory that is around 2200 years old.
Puente de Occidente (Western Bridge)	A suspension bridge crossing a river. Two tower-like structures on the bank serve as support.	Antioquia	2012	i, iv (cultural)	The bridge, designed by José María Villa, crosses the Cauca River. It is a suspension bridge with a span of almost 300 m (980 ft). When opened in 1895, it was the third largest bridge in the world and the largest in South America. The architect took the Brooklyn Bridge as a design reference and adjusted it to the local settings. The bridge represented an important engineering achievement of the era and allowed for economic development of the until then isolated region.
Cultural Landscape of the Vernacular Stilt Housing of Cienaga Grande de Santa Marta and of Medio Atrato	Two stilt houses connected by an elevated bridge	Antioquia, Chocó, Magdalena	2013	iv, v (cultural)	The area between the Sierra Nevada de Santa Marta mountains and the Magdalena River is covered by wet tropical rainforest and is designated a Ramsar wetland. People adapted to the natural environment by constructing stilt houses (example pictured). The area of Medio Atrato has been inhabited since the 17th century by people mostly of African descent. The main economic activity is fishing.
The architectural legacy of Rogelio Salmona: an ethical, political, social and poetic manifesto	A circular two-level construction with columns as a part of a larger building	Bogotá, Bolívar	2022	ii, iv (cultural)	This nomination comprises seven works by the French-Colombian architect Rogelio Salmona (1927–2007). The buildings, constructed from the middle of the 20th to the beginning of the 21st century, reflect the ideals of the architect who wanted to create an open city with public spaces for diverse encounters. He was drawing from various Western traditions and those from Mesoamerica to produce his artistic expression. Buildings include the Gabriel García Márquez Cultural Center (pictured), General Archive of the Nation, and the Graduate School Building at the National University of Colombia.
Paleontological Sites of the Middle Devonian of Floresta, Boyacá	Marine fossils as a museum exhibit	Boyacá	2024	viii (natural)	The Floresta Formation from the Middle Devonian epoch is rich with fossils of different types of marine invertebrates, such as trilobites, bivalves, bryozoans, gastropods, and crustaceans. The rock formation, which is around 700 m (2,300 ft) thick, allows studies of the evolution of life and environment over the period of around ten million years. A museum exhibit of some fossils from the formation is pictured.
The La Venta Konzentrat-Lagerstätte: a Neotropical moist forest biome of the middle Miocene		Huila	2024	viii (natural)	La Venta is a fossil site with remains from the Middle Miocene sub-epoch, from roughly 13 million years ago, during the Middle Miocene Climatic Optimum. There are fossils of different fish, caiman, early anacondas, as well as mammals. Here, metatheria and xenarthra species are represented, as well as different ungulates, bats, and rodents. It provides a glimpse of what life in the region was like before the main wave of the Great American Interchange.

== See also ==
- List of Intangible Cultural Heritage elements in Colombia
