= Barbacoas =

Barbacoa or Barbacoas may refer to:

- Barbacoa, a “Framework of sticks” or grill, from where barbecue and the word for this are derived. In Mexico, an earth oven and the food being prepared.
- Barbacoan languages

== Colombia ==
- Barbacoas, La Guajira, a village in Riohacha Municipality, La Guajira Department
- Barbacoas Municipality, a municipality in Nariño Department, 1°40′19.7″N 78°08′27.6″W
  - Barbacoas, Nariño, a town in Barbacoas Municipality, Nariño Department
- Barbacoas, Santander, a village in Santander Department, 06°43′N 74°12′W

== Costa Rica ==
- Barbacoas, Costa Rica

== Venezuela ==
- Barbacoas, Aragua, a city in Aragua State
- Barbacoas, Lara, a village in Morán Municipality, Lara State
