= Mamarongo =

- Vereda
- Location in La Guajira and Colombia Mamarongo (Colombia)
- Coordinates: 10°57′19″N 73°17′54″W
- Country: Colombia
- Department: La Guajira Department
- Municipality: Riohacha Municipality
- Elevation: 6,217 ft (1,895 m)
- Time zone: UTC-5 (Colombia Standard Time)

Mamarongo is a vereda in Riohacha Municipality, La Guajira Department in Colombia. It is located at the foothills of the Sierra Nevada de Santa Marta mountain range.

== Climate ==
Mamarongo has a subtropical highland climate (Cfb) with moderate rainfall from December to March and heavy to very heavy rainfall from April to November.

Climate data for Mamarongo
Month	Jan	Feb	Mar	Apr	May	Jun	Jul	Aug	Sep	Oct	Nov	Dec	Year
Mean daily maximum °C (°F)	19.9 (67.8)	21.0 (69.8)	21.1 (70.0)	21.3 (70.3)	21.4 (70.5)	21.3 (70.3)	21.8 (71.2)	21.9 (71.4)	21.2 (70.2)	20.4 (68.7)	20.3 (68.5)	20.8 (69.4)	21.0 (69.8)
Daily mean °C (°F)	14.7 (58.5)	15.3 (59.5)	15.7 (60.3)	16.2 (61.2)	16.3 (61.3)	16.6 (61.9)	16.5 (61.7)	16.5 (61.7)	16.4 (61.5)	16.0 (60.8)	15.7 (60.3)	15.1 (59.2)	15.9 (60.7)
Mean daily minimum °C (°F)	9.5 (49.1)	9.6 (49.3)	10.4 (50.7)	11.1 (52.0)	11.2 (52.2)	11.9 (53.4)	11.3 (52.3)	11.2 (52.2)	11.7 (53.1)	11.6 (52.9)	11.1 (52.0)	9.4 (48.9)	10.8 (51.5)
Average rainfall mm (inches)	41 (1.6)	48 (1.9)	86 (3.4)	279 (11.0)	382 (15.0)	183 (7.2)	110 (4.3)	225 (8.9)	308 (12.1)	441 (17.4)	329 (13.0)	90 (3.5)	2,522 (99.3)
Source: Climate-Data.org
