= Cerrillo =

Cerrillo is a surname of Spanish origin. Notable people with the surname include:

- Edwin Cerrillo (born October 3, 2000) American soccer player
- José Luis Cerrillo (born 1952) Mexican politician
- Manuel Mota Cerrillo (9 July 1966 ‒ 8 January 2013) Spanish fashion designer
- Raquel Jiménez Cerrillo (born 1966) Mexican politician affiliated with the PAN

== See Also ==
- Cerrillos
- Carrillo (surname)
