= List of mayors of Barrancas =

The following is a list of mayors in the Colombian municipality of Barrancas, La Guajira.

Year	Mayor
1709 – ???	Eugenio Vidal
1813 – ???	Juan Manuel Garavito
1875 – ???	Lorenzo Solano Gómez
1900 – ???	Nemesio Saltarén
1917–1917	Juan Gómez Mendoza
1917–1917	Gregorio Bonilla
1917–1917	Tómas Peláez
1917 – ???	Antonio Saltarén Carrillo
1920 – ???	José Concepción Romero
1926–1930	Sebastián Pinto Solano
1930–1931	Numas Tovar Soto
1931–1932	Pedro Fortunato Ospino
1932–1933	Luís Emilio Plata
1933–1933	Pedro Eslava
1933–1934	Francisco A. Ramírez
1934–1934	Jacobo Gómez
1934–1934	Domingo Gómez
1934–1935	Segundo Brito Robles
1935–1935	José María Iguaran
1935–1936	Esteban Almenárez Brito
1936–1936	Segundo Brito Robles
1936–1937	Rafael Solano Gómez
1937–1937	Francisco f. Robles
1937–1937	Wilson Delúquez
1937–1938	Héctor Solano Redondo
1938–1938	Eugenio Ríos
1938–1939	Gabriel Solano Vidal
1939–1940	Rafael Solano Gómez
1940–1941	Pedro Iguarán Asís
1941–1942	Juan Pertuz Pertuz
1942–1943	Luís Loreto Cerchar
1943–1944	José del Rosario Gutiérrez
1944–1945	Franklin Figueroa
1945–1946	Simeón Soto
1946–1947	Célico Garzón
1947–1947	Guillermo Hernández
1947–1947	Célico Garzón
1947–1948	Emilio Saltarén Reinoso
1948–1948	Piolelio Ortegón (military)
1948–1949	Daniel Robles
1949–1949	Sebastián Yancy
1949–1949	Samuel Soto
1949–1949	Daniel Robles
1949–1949	"Cabo" Cadena (military)
1950–1950	Camilo Quiñónes (military)
1950–1950	Rafael Henríquez
1950–1951	Luís Carlos Cobo
1951–1951	Bienvenido Torres
1951–1952	Tomás Solano Tovar
1952–1954	Emérito Gómez
1954–1955	Ramiro González (military)
1955–1955	Emilio Saltarén Reinoso
1955–1955	Tomás Solano Tovar
1955–1956	Pedro Guzmán (military)
1956–1956	Emilio Saltarén Reinoso
1956–1957	Salatiel Guerra (military)
1957–1957	Manuel Hernández
1957–1959	José Solano Solano
1959–1959	Simón Arregocés
1959–1959	Alcibiades Pinto Romero
1959–1960	Gustavo Salas Asís
1960–1961	Carlos Salas Solano
1961–1961	Luís Loreto Cerchar
1961–1961	Plácido Gutiérrez (military)
1961–1961	Wilson Velázquez (military)
1961–1961	Manuel Tapias Rojano
1961–1962	Luís Loreto Cerchar
1962–1962	Luís Emilio Plata
1962–1962	Manuel Tapias Rojano
1962–1962	Sabas Medina Barros
1962–1962	Avelino González (military)
1962–1962	Mario Rojas (military)
1962–1963	Teófilo Freyle (military)
1963–1964	Alfonso Gómez Barros
1964–1964	Luís Loreto Cerchar
1964–1964	Alfonso Angulo González
1964–1965	David Pinto Romero
1965–1965	Néstor Brugues Pinedo
1965–1965	Felipe Peláez Bermúdez
1965–1966	Rafael Del Prado
1966–1966	Emilio Saltarén Reinoso
1966–1967	Francisco Peláez Soto
1967–1967	Manuel Tapias Rojano
1967–1968	Carlos Carrillo B.
1968–1968	Juan Manuel León
1968–1970	Josefa Hernández Parodi
1970–1970	Manuel Tapias Rojano
1970–1971	Halminton Freyle
1971–1971	Juan Soto León
1971–1972	Obardo Pinto Romero
1972–1972	Hugues Romero
1972–1973	Obardo Pinto Romero
1973–1974	Rafael Corsino Solano
1974–1975	Pedro Fonseca
1975–1976	Juan Soto León
1976–1976	Nando Almenárez
1976–1977	Nora Romero Soto
1977–1977	Francisco Abdala
1977–1978	Deniris Núñez
1978–1978	Juan Manuel León
1978–1979	Marcos Castañeda
1979–1980	Juan Manuel León
1980–1981	Remedios Rois Olivella
1981–1981	Saúl Ramírez Asís
1981–1982	Luís Loreto Cerchar
1982–1982	Manuel Tapias Rojano
1982–1983	Sebastián Pinto
1983–1984	Cerelda Guerra Solano
1984–1985	Serbando Solano Pérez
1985–1985	Sigifredo Almenárez
1985–1985	Alfonso Gómez Barros
1985–1986	Luís Angel Puche Pinto
1986–1987	Jaime Gómez Carrillo
1987–1988	Sigifredo Almenárez

Elected by popular vote

Year	Mayor
1988–1990	José Berardinelli
1990–1992	José Soto Berardinelli
1992–1994	José Domingo Solano
1995–1997	Juan Francisco Gómez
1998–2000	Miguel Fonseca Gámez
2000–2003	Juan Francisco Gómez
2003–2007	Yadra Cecilia Brito
2008–present	Juan Carlos Leon Solano

== See also ==
- List of governors of La Guajira Department
