= Barrancas, La Guajira =

Coordinates: 11°00′N 72°45′W

Barrancas
- Town
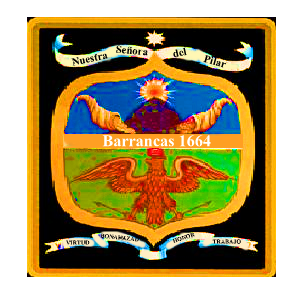
- Flag Coat of arms

- Location of the town and municipality of Barrancas in La Guajira Department.
- Country: Colombia
- Region: Caribbean
- Department: La Guajira
- Established: 1872

Government
  - Mayor: Juan Carlos Leon Solano (L)

Area
  - Town: 1,060 km^{2} (410 sq mi)
  - Urban: 742 km^{2} (286 sq mi)
- Elevation: 40 m (130 ft)

Population (2020 est.)
  - Town: 38,232
  - Density: 36.1/km^{2} (93.4/sq mi)
- Time zone: UTC-5
- Climate: Aw

Barrancas is a town and municipality in the Colombian Department of La Guajira. The municipality of Barrancas is located to the west of the Ranchería River in a valley between the Sierra Nevada de Santa Marta and Serranía del Perijá mountains. Barrancas has a total area of 742 km^{2} and an elevation of 40 meters above sea level. The average temperature is 28 °C throughout the year. It became a municipality in 1892.

Its economy is based on agriculture and coal mining which is exploited by the Cerrejón coal mine.

== Geography ==
Barrancas is located in the Guajira Peninsula in the Caribbean Region of Colombia, limiting to the east with the Bolivarian Republic of Venezuela; to the north with the municipalities of Hatonuevo and Albania; to the south with the municipality of Fonseca and to the west with the municipality of Riohacha. The municipality covers a total area of 742 km^{2} (286.5 sq mi) and is some 40 m (131 ft) over the sea level.

The municipality of Barrancas lies in the Valley of Upar formed between the Sierra Nevada de Santa Marta (west) and the Serranía del Perijá (east) and within the basin of the Ranchería River.

=== Climate ===
The climate present in the region is predominantly hot and dry with no mountainous climate variations, maintaining an average temperature throughout the year of 28 °C; while in the lower plains temperature can reach 35 °C, while in the mountainous area of the municipality the temperature is milder. During the rainy season temperature in the mountainous part of the municipality can reach between 15 and 18 °C while in the dry season 18-24 °C. Higher temperatures are reached by the end of March, April and May In June and July temperatures drop and in August and September raises. In October and November drops once again and raises in December and January due to the trade winds.

== History ==
Barrancas was founded in 1664, when the Spaniards arrived in the region.

During the war of independence from Spain, on March 26, 1813, the Cabildo of Barrancas insurrected against the local Spanish monarchy authorities destroying images and coat of arms of King Fernando VII. The cabildo also swore loyalty to Simón Bolívar. The revolt was led by Eugenio Vidal, Javier López Sierra, Jose Rodriguez Romero, Misael Orozco, Pedro Ojeda, Crisanto Solano, Bienvenido Gomez and Pedro Miguel Garavito.

Barrancas was one of the villages part of the Province of Padilla and became a municipality in 1892. It was also one of the five municipalities that grouped to form the Department of La Guajira in 1954, then called Intendencia Nacional de La Guajira by orders of then military dictator Gustavo Rojas Pinilla.

== Politics ==
- List of mayors of Barrancas

== Demographics ==
According to projections made by the DANE for the year 2005 the municipality of Barrancas had a population of approximately 29,856 inhabitants.

Year	Population total
2002	27,519
2003	28,285
2004	29,064
2005	29,856

== Economy ==
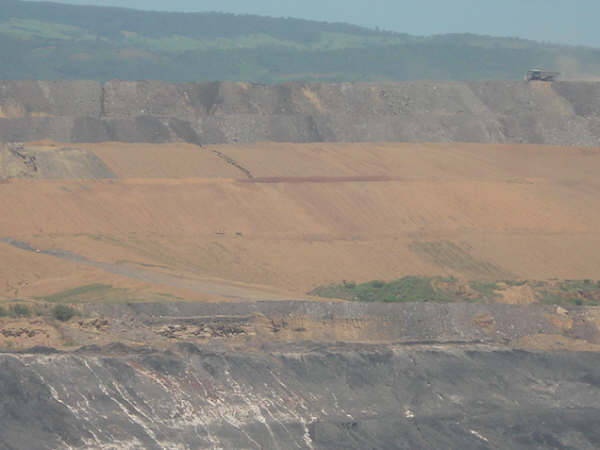
Section of the Cerrejón coal mine open pit near the Serranía del Perijá mountain range.

The municipality of Barrancas is connected through a highway to the department capital, Riohacha and the main commercial town in the department, Maicao. Barrancas also has cultural influence and commercial trade related to agriculture from the city of Valledupar in the Department of Cesar. Barrancas commercializes in small scale agricultural products such as coffee, plantain, cotton, maize and yuca, but the main economic activity in the municipality is the exploitation of coal at Cerrejón coal mine. The Cerrejón coal mine is one of the largest open pit coal mines in the world.

== Culture ==
The municipality celebrates the Festival y Reinado Nacional del Carbón (Coal National festival and Pageant) in October.

== Notable people ==
- Leandro Díaz (1928–2013), music composer
- Luis Díaz, footballer for FC Bayern Munich and the Colombia national team
- Joaquín Gómez, bloc commander and member of the Revolutionary Armed Forces of Colombia
