= Riohacha Municipality =

Municipality in Columbia

Location of Riohacha Municipality

Riohacha Municipality (Spanish pronunciation: [rjoˈatʃa]) is located on the Caribbean region of Colombia of La Guajira Department, Colombia. It extends over 3,120 km^{2} and has an urban part divided into 10 Communes, 14 Corregimientos and 8 Resguardos Indígenas. 7 of the indigenous regions belong to the Wayuu and one in the Sierra Nevada de Santa Marta region shared by the Kogi, the Wiwa, and the Ijka, a subtribe of the Arhuaco people.

Riohacha is 1,121 km north of Bogotá. The municipality is located in the southwestern part of La Guajira Department and is bordered by the municipality of Dibulla to the west, the Caribbean Sea to the northwest, the municipality of Manaure to the north, the Municipalities of Maicao and Albania to the east, the municipalities of Hatonuevo, Barrancas, Distracción, Fonseca to the southeast and San Juan del Cesar to the south.

== Corregimientos ==
The municipality consists of an urban part and 14 Corregimientos: Camarones, Tigreras, Choles, Matitas, Arroyo Arena, Galán, Barbacoas, Tomarrazón, Juan y Medio, Las Palmas, Cerrillo, Cotopríx, Monguí and Villa Martin.

== Comunas ==
The city is divided into 10 comunas with the following barrios:

1. Comuna Centro Histórico: Centro, Barrio Arriba, Barrio Abajo, Urbanización El Faro.
2. Comuna Nuevo Centro: San Martín de Porres, Los Remedios, El Acueducto, El Libertador, Urbanización El Tatual.
3. Comuna Coquivacoa: Coquivacoa, Padilla, José Antonio Galán, Urbanización Sol Tropical, Urbanización Terrazas de Coquivacoa, Paraíso, Guapuna, Las Mercedes, Luis Antonio Robles, Coquivacoa.
4. Comuna Cooperativo: 12 de octubre, Urbanización Marbella, San Tropel, Nuevo Horizonte, Urbanización Portal de Comfamiliar, Cooperativo Nuevo Faro, La Ñapa, Edinson Deluque Pinto, Urbanización Manantial, Urbanización Majayura I y II, Jorge Pérez.
5. Comuna Aeropuerto Almirante Padilla: Cactus I Y II, Che Guevara, Las Tunas, Caribe, San Martín de Loba, Matajuna, Aeropuerto, La Paz, Nazareth.
6. Comuna Nuestra Señora De Los Remedios: Obrero, 20 de julio, San Francisco, Rojas Pinilla, La Loma, Nuestra Señora de los Remedios, José Arnoldo Marín, Calancala, Las Villas, Entre Ríos, Los Medanos, El Progreso, Luis Eduardo Cuellar, Villa Tatiana, Kepiagua.
7. Comuna Boca Grande: La Cosecha, Boca Grande, Los Nogales, San Judas, El Comunitario, Los Olivos, Divino Niño, La Esperanza, 15 de mayo, Comfamiliar 2000, Simón Bolívar, Eurare, Buganvilla.
8. Comuna Ecológica Laguna Salada y El Patrón: Camilo Torres, Maria Eugenia Rojas, Ranchería, Villa Laura, Urbanización Villa Armando, Urbanización Bella Vista, Urbanización Solmar, Buenos Aires, Los Cerezos, 7 de agosto, Urbanización Pareigua, Claudia Catalina, Pilar Del Río, Urbanización Wuetapia.
9. Comuna Eco – Turística Río Ranchería: Urbanización Villa Comfamiliar, Urbanización Villa Del Mar, Urbanización Villa Tatiana, Villa Fátima.
10. Comuna El Dividivi: Ciudadela El Dividivi, Los Almendros, Los Loteros, Villa Sharin, Urbanización La Floresta, Hugo Zúñiga, Urbanización San Judas Tadeo, Urbanización San Isidro, Villa Yolima, Villa Jardín, 31 de octubre, Urbanización la Mano de Dios, Las Mercedes, Nuevo Milenio, Urbanización Villa Aurora, Urbanización Taguaira, La Lucha, La Luchita.

== See also ==
- Riohacha Province
