= Albania, La Guajira =

Coordinates: 11.1597°N 72.5856°W

- town
- Flag Coat of arms
- Nickname: "Princesa Negra" (Black Princess)
- Location of the town and municipality of Albania in the Department of La Guajira.
- Country: Colombia
- Region: Caribbean
- Department: La Guajira
- Foundation: January 27, 1801

Government
  - Mayor: Nestor Saenz Gonzalez

Area
  - Total: 425 km^{2} (164 sq mi)
- Elevation: 320 m (1,050 ft)

Population (Census 2018)
  - Total: 26,940
  - Density: 63.4/km^{2} (164/sq mi)
- Time zone: UTC-5
- Climate: Aw
- Website: albania-laguajira.gov.co/

Albania (previously known as Calabacito from the Spanish meaning small calabash tree) is a town and municipality in the Colombian department of La Guajira. It is the most recently formed municipality of La Guajira along with the town of Uribia, among others, created on March 19, 2000. Albania neighbours an exclusive enclosed camp site for the Cerrejón coal mine workers and their families, named Mushaisa.

== Geography ==
The municipality of Albania is located in the Guajira Peninsula, northern Colombia presenting a predominantly flat and arid terrain by the steps of the Serranía del Perijá to the east and the Sierra Nevada de Santa Marta to the west, within the basin of the Ranchería River. The municipality of Albania limits to the north with the municipality of Maicao; to the east with the Bolivarian Republic of Venezuela and Maicao; to the south with the municipalities of Hatonuevo, to the west with the municipalities of Hatonuevo and Riohacha.

The municipal seat is located at 72° 56’ east y 98° 08’ north. The municipality has a total area of 425 km^{2}. Since May, 2001 the Colombian government authorized an urban corridor between Albania and the locality of Cuestecitas of approximately 95 km^{2} pertaining to the mining zone. The municipality has one of the largest deposits of coal in Colombia.

== History ==
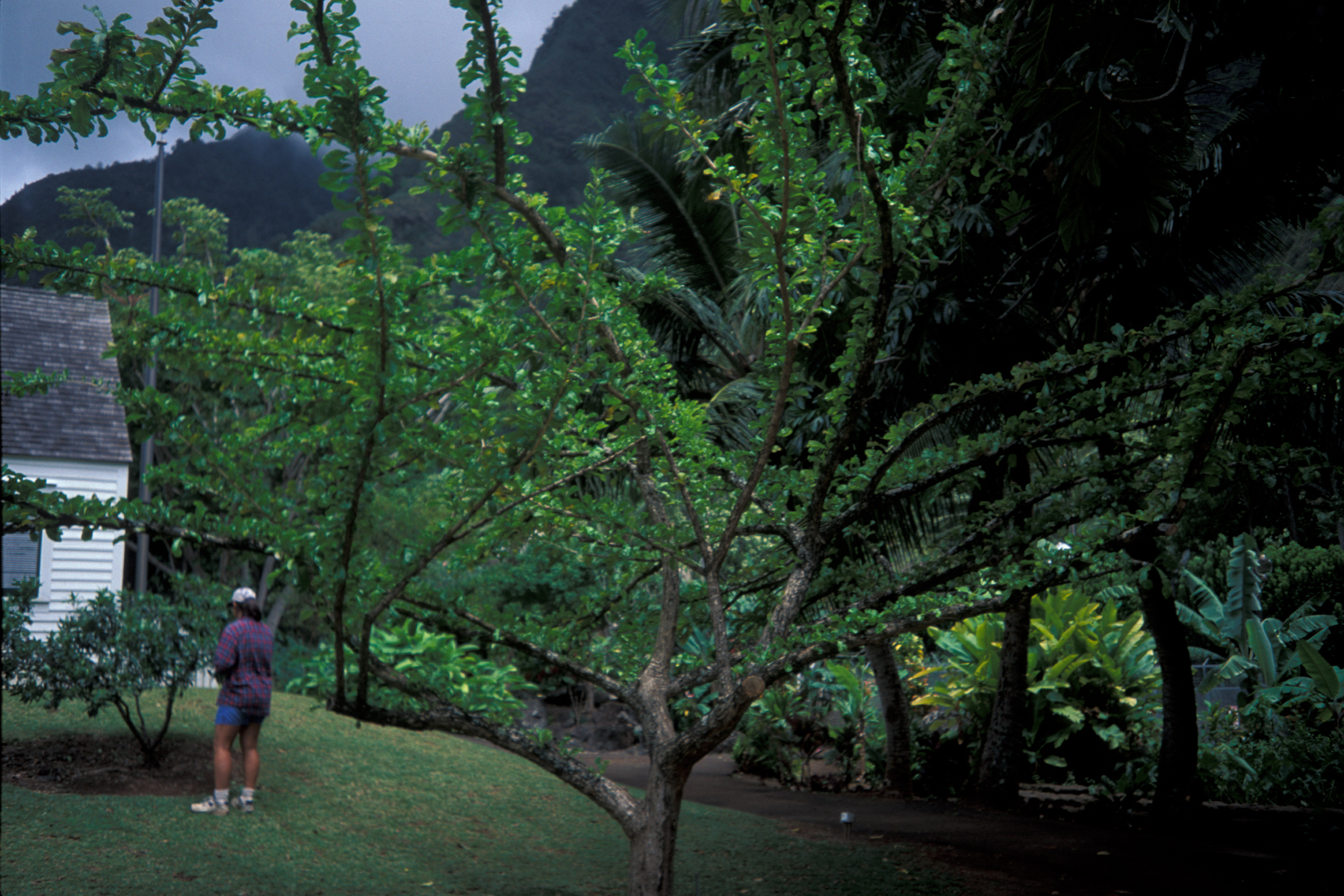
The Crescentia cujete (Calabash trees) colloquially known as Calabazos, first name of Albania.

The village of Calabacito was founded in the early 19th century and was first inhabited by indigenous groups pertaining to the Cocinas, Cariachiles and Wayuu who, due to their nomad traditions abandoned the area. It was repopulated later by former African slaves or their descendants probably escaping from the settlements of Moreno, Tabaco or Barrancas.

These first inhabitants were blacks or mulattos and probably came also from a settlement known as "Soldado" in the early 20th century by 1903 escaping from political persecution or the civil war itself in which Colombia was engulfed between 1899 and 1902 known as the "Thousand Days' War".

The first settlers apparently were seeking to establish agricultural production. The area was largely populated by Crescentia cujete (Calabash trees) colloquially known as Calabazos or Totumos.

Politically and administratively, Albania was along the settlements of Manantial, Cuestecitas and Los Remedios under the mandate of the Province of Santa Marta (Sovereign State of Magdalena) until the year 1911 when it became part of the Special Commissary of La Guajira. The name of Calabacito was changed in 1937 by a commissar of La Guajira named Eduardo Londoño Villegas, who named it after his daughter Alba Londoño Sánchez (1923–2023) or as other version suggests, after the country in the Balkans, Albania.

During the military dictatorship of Gen. Gustavo Rojas Pinilla, Albania was annexed officially by Decree 1824 of 1954 to the Special Commissary of La Guajira; integrated by Uribia (then capital) and the village of Maicao. Along Albania the villages of Cuestecitas and Manantial were also included through Executive Decree 807.

By Law 105 of December 12, 1960, the government of Colombia created the National Intendency of La Guajira, legalized by Decree 1824 by legislative act 1 of December 28 of the same year making La Guajira a department. The legislative act was officially enforced on July 1, 1965.

Albania became a municipality on March 27, 2000, by Ordinance 001 passed by the Department Assembly of La Guajira, presented by then deputy Alvaro Gustavo Rosado. The first Mayor of Albania was Adel Enrique Pinto, designated by Decrere 080 of March 29, 2000.

== Climate ==
Climate data for Albania (Camp Intercor), elevation 122 m (400 ft), (1981–2010)
Month	Jan	Feb	Mar	Apr	May	Jun	Jul	Aug	Sep	Oct	Nov	Dec	Year
Mean daily maximum °C (°F)	32.6 (90.7)	33.4 (92.1)	34.4 (93.9)	34.4 (93.9)	34.3 (93.7)	34.3 (93.7)	34.9 (94.8)	35.4 (95.7)	34.5 (94.1)	33.1 (91.6)	32.5 (90.5)	31.8 (89.2)	33.9 (93.0)
Daily mean °C (°F)	27.1 (80.8)	27.5 (81.5)	28.1 (82.6)	28.5 (83.3)	28.3 (82.9)	28.6 (83.5)	29.1 (84.4)	29.0 (84.2)	28.2 (82.8)	27.4 (81.3)	27.2 (81.0)	26.7 (80.1)	28.0 (82.4)
Mean daily minimum °C (°F)	22.0 (71.6)	22.6 (72.7)	23.1 (73.6)	23.6 (74.5)	23.5 (74.3)	23.8 (74.8)	23.9 (75.0)	23.4 (74.1)	22.3 (72.1)	21.8 (71.2)	22.1 (71.8)	21.9 (71.4)	22.9 (73.2)
Average precipitation mm (inches)	14.7 (0.58)	15.7 (0.62)	3.2 (0.13)	95.7 (3.77)	135.4 (5.33)	75.5 (2.97)	53.2 (2.09)	93.0 (3.66)	158.3 (6.23)	177.7 (7.00)	161.5 (6.36)	54.0 (2.13)	1,004.9 (39.56)
Average precipitation days	4	3	2	7	11	8	7	9	13	15	12	7	92
Average relative humidity (%)	71	69	66	69	74	73	69	70	75	79	79	75	72
Mean monthly sunshine hours	260.4	223.0	232.5	174.0	189.1	201.0	244.9	241.8	219.0	189.1	225.0	226.3	2,626.1
Mean daily sunshine hours	8.4	7.9	7.5	5.8	6.1	6.7	7.9	7.8	7.3	6.1	7.5	7.3	7.2
Source: Instituto de Hidrologia Meteorologia y Estudios Ambientales

== Politics ==
=== Administrative divisions ===
==== Corregimientos ====
- Cuestecitas
- Los Remedios
- Porciosa
- Wareware

==== Veredas ====
- Urapa
- Paradero
- Santa Fé
- Amarre
- Campo Herrera
- Piedra Amarilla

==== Indigenous reserves ====
- Resguardo Indígena Wayúu de la Alta y Media Guajira
- Resguardo Indígena Wayúu Cuatro de Noviembre

== Demographics ==
In 2001 the population of Albania was of approximately 8,637 inhabitants with 3,535 of these living in the seat of the municipality. There were 707 homes and some 807 families. The area is a traditional territory of Wayuu indigenous tribe influence.

In the 2005 census, 67% of people in the municipality of Albania lived in houses, 19% in apartments and 13% in a studio or rented room. 6.1% of these had a home based economy. 72% of the population had electricity service, 43% had sewer services, 66% had aqueduct service, 27% had natural gas service and 24% had a home telephone.

the population of Albania in terms of gender is made up by 51% of males and 49% of females, presenting a relatively young population. 29% of these considered itself indigenous while a 10% mestizo, raizal or Afro-Colombian.

== Education ==
Colegio Albania, an American international school, is in Albania, within the Mushaisa residential complex.
