= Ranchería River =

River in Colombia

Ranchería
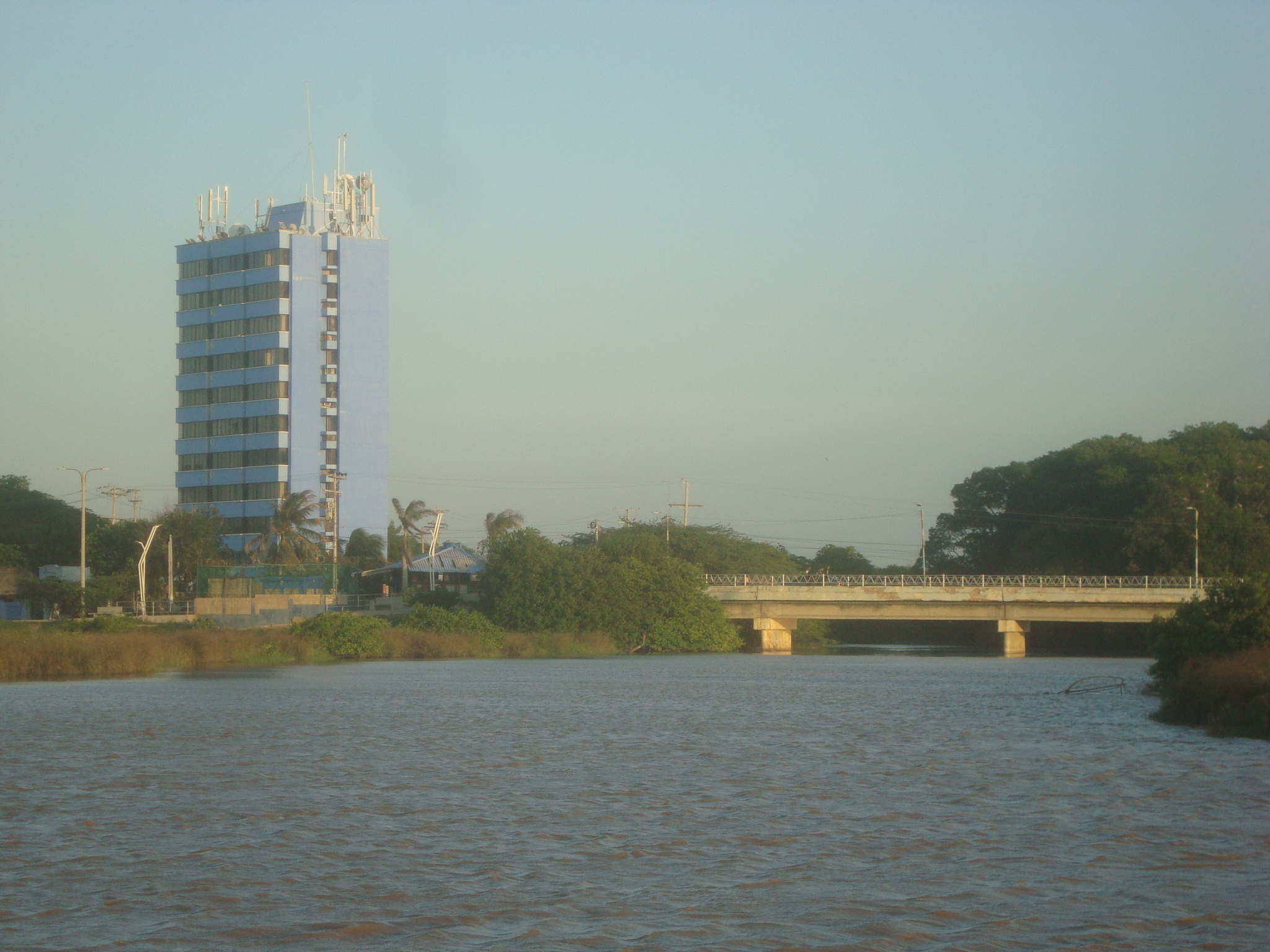
- Ranchería River Mouth in Riohacha

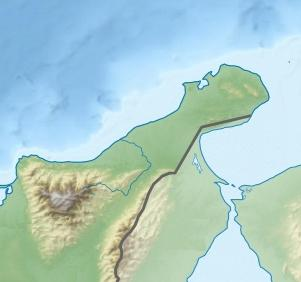
- Map of the Ranchería River watershed
- Etymology: Traditional Settlement of the Wayuu people

Location
- Country: Colombia
- Cities: Riohacha; Fonseca; Albania; Barrancas; Distracción

Physical characteristics
- Source: Southern La Guajira Department, North Eastern Magdalena Department
  - location: Sierra Nevada de Santa Marta, Colombia
  - elevation: Approx. 3,000 m (9,800 ft)
- Mouth: Caribbean Sea
  - location: Riohacha, Colombia
- Length: 150 km (93 mi)

The Ranchería River (Spanish: Río Ranchería) is a river located in northern La Guajira Department, Colombia. Born in the Sierra Nevada de Santa Marta southern steps flows south, abruptly turns northeast and then north where it finally flows into the Caribbean Sea. It is the main river of La Guajira Department and has great significance for the Wayuu people.

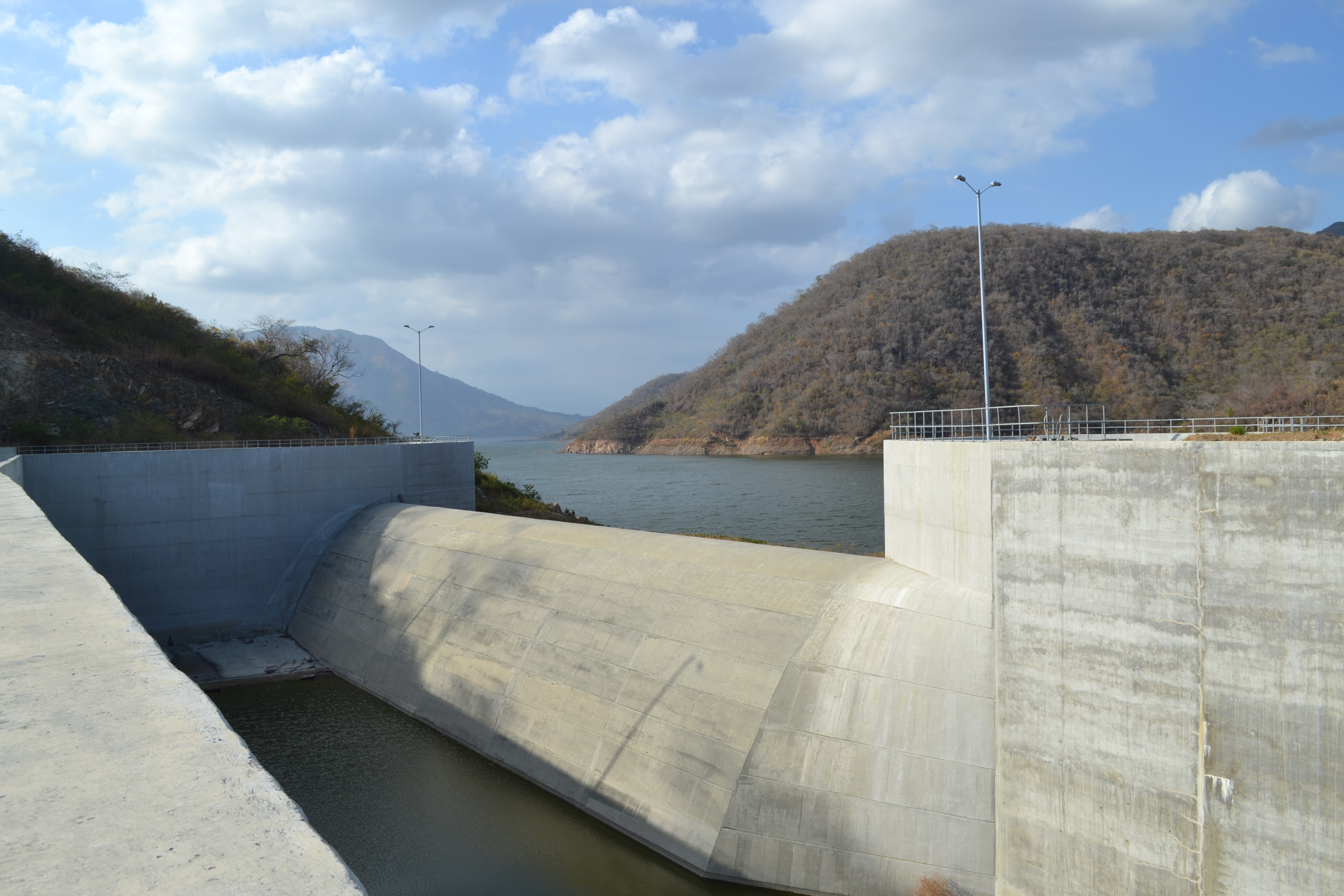
Vertedero - Presa El Cercado - Proyecto Río Ranchería ( La Guajira - Colombia)

A large dam, the "El Cercado", was first proposed in the 1950s in the Sierra Nevada de Santa Marta mountains, as an irrigation source for agribusiness and for the population of at least nine municipalities. The Sierra Nevada Indigenous communities protested the dam, which they regarded as a systematic appropriation of the river by landowners and the coal mining industry (the world's largest open-pit coalmine, Cerrejón, is allowed around 16% of the river's volumetric flow). It was completed in the mid 2000s (picture)

The river flows down to a region of water scarcity in the semi-desert lowlands to the north and west. Four water management phases were envisaged, but by 2021 only dam construction has been completed and pipelines for irrigation, which are not connected. Irrigation connections, aqueducts and a seven megawatts hydroelectric plant are programmed but there are significant accusations that they have been uncompleted due to corruption and mismanagement.

== 2007 floods ==
On April 22, 2007, the Rancheria river flooded the municipality of Manaure in La Guajira after three or four days of continuous precipitation. The town of Manaure suffered floods in 24 neighborhoods and some 30 communities in the rural area of the municipality and also affected sections of the municipality of Riohacha. Flood victims (some 1,250 families, mostly pertaining to the Wayuu ethnic group) had to be evacuated on boats and jet skis by the Colombian Red Cross and the Colombian Civil Defense due to the difficult conditions in the area. They also delivered medical and food supplies. The Governor of La Guajira José González, was also present in the area and asked the national government for assistance and aid.
