= Cerrejón =

Coal mine in Albania, Barrancas, Hatonuevo, La Guajira, Colombia

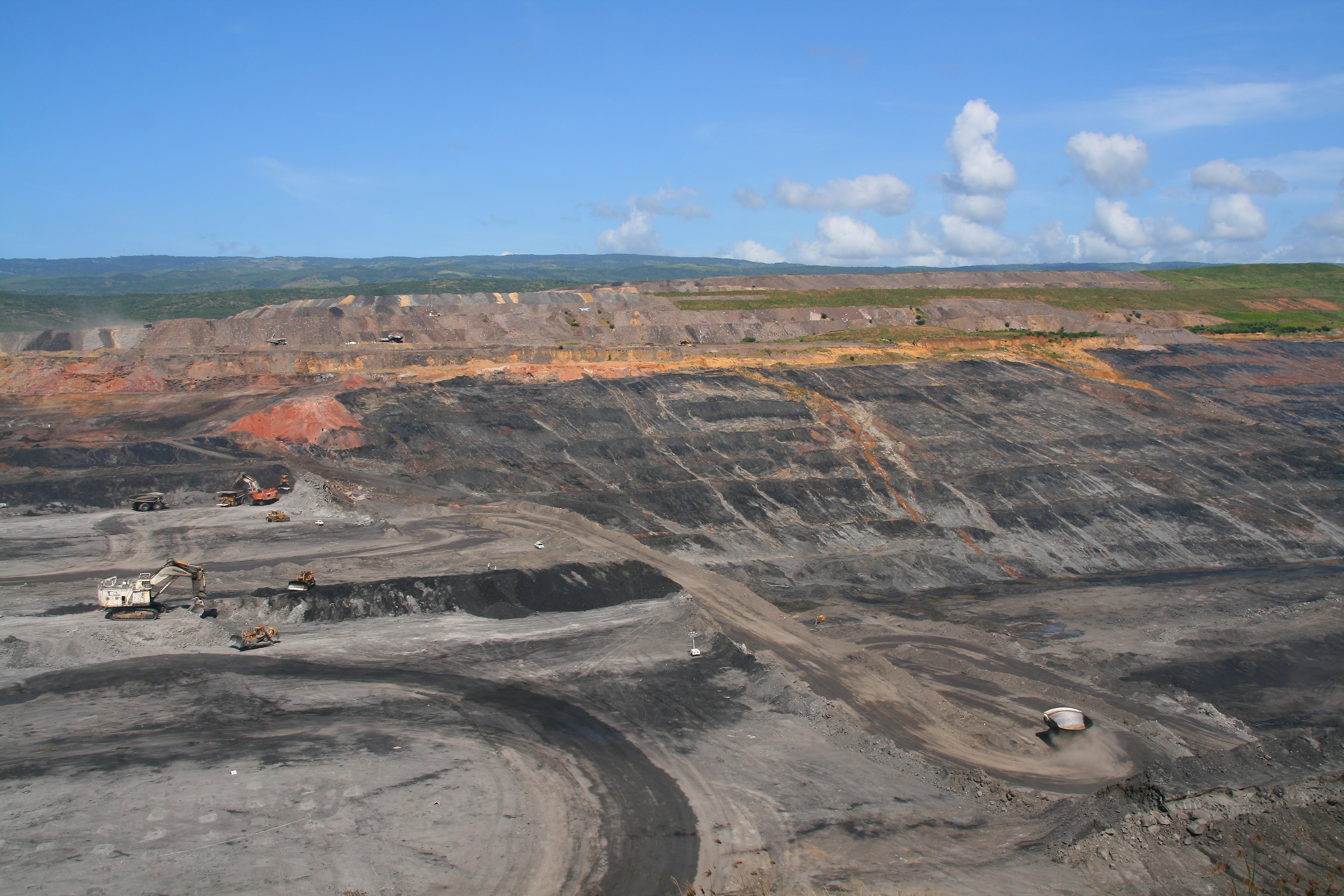
- View of Cerrejón

- Location of Cerrejón in La Guajira
- Location: Albania, Barrancas, Hatonuevo, La Guajira, Colombia; 11°05′22″N 72°40′31″W
- Products: Low-ash, low-S bituminous coal
- Production: 32,683,315 t (32,167,132 long tons; 36,027,188 short tons)/year
- Financial year: 2016
- Type: Open-pit coal mine
- Greatest depth: 180 m (590 ft)
- Opened: 1985
- Company: Glencore (99.9 %)
- Website: Official website

Cerrejón is a large open-pit coal mine in Northern Colombia owned by Glencore. At Cerrejón, low-ash, low-sulphur bituminous coal from the Cerrejón Formation is excavated. At over 690 square kilometres (270 sq mi) the mine is one of the largest of its type, the largest in Latin America and the tenth biggest in the world. Cerrejón is divided into three sections, North Zone, Central Zone and South Zone. Total proven reserves are estimated at 503 megatonnes. In 2016, the mine produced 32,683,315 tonnes (32,167,132 long tons; 36,027,188 short tons).

In June 2020, lawyers for the local Wayuu community lodged a request to the United Nations special rapporteur for human rights and the environment for work to be immediately halted over environmental and human rights concerns. In September 2020, several UN independent human rights experts called for the mining operations to be temporarily suspended, citing the serious damage to the environment and the negative effects on the health and other rights of the indigenous peoples who live in the area due to the spread of coal dust and water pollution.

== Geography ==
Cerrejón is located in Northern Colombia in the southeast of the department of the arid plain La Guajira, close to the border with Venezuela.

The mine extends over 690 square kilometres (270 sq mi) and is situated in the northeastern part of the Cesar-Ranchería Basin, the basin of the Ranchería River, between the Sierra Nevada de Santa Marta in the west and the Serranía del Perijá to the southeast.

== Prehistory ==
Cerrejón was once home to the Titanoboa (Titanoboa cerrejonensis), the largest snake ever on the planet, that dwarfed even today's anaconda and also dominated prehistoric Cerrejón, 60 million years ago along with large fish, turtles and crocodiles; with crocodiles being its main food sources. Titanoboa may have eaten the fish that roamed the waters of its home and may have preyed on them like the crocodiles, but due to the changing climate Titanoboa and the creatures that lived with it disappeared from the face of Cerrejón.

== History ==
=== The 19th century ===
There is controversy about the discoverer of Cerrejón mine, and some names are shuffled: the American civil engineer John May, hired by the national government, which conducted the examination in 1864; the writer Jorge Isaacs; and Mr. Juan Gomez Osío, native of La Guajira. In the 19th century small scale mining began.

=== Cerrejón North Zone ===
The "defunct" company Intercor (International Colombia Resources Corporation) was in its time called "The Cerrejón Zona Norte Coal Project": In December 1976, a partnership contract was signed between Carbocol S. A. (Carbones de Colombia S. A.), a state-owned firm, and Intercor (International Colombia Resources Corporation Intercor), at the time Exxon, today ExxonMobil subsidiary, to develop the north zone of Cerrejón. This contract considered three stages: exploration (1977–1980), construction (1981–1986), and production (1986–2009). In January 1999, the Colombian government extended the concession for a further 25 years, to 2034.

In November 2000, the Colombian government sold its Carbocol S. A. shares (50%) in the partnership contract Cerrejón North Zone to a consortium comprising subsidiaries of BHP Billiton, Anglo American, and Glencore. In 2013, Glencore merged with Xstrata. In February 2002, this consortium acquired the remaining 50% of shares from Intercor (ExxonMobil), thereby becoming sole concessioners of the Cerrejón North Zone. In November 2002, the union of the purchased to Intercor and Carbones del Cerrejón S. A. was formalized, and the official name of the mine operator was changed to Carbones del Cerrejón Limited, Cerrejón.

=== Cerrejón Central Zone ===
In this zone, there are two areas under concession:

- The Central Deposit (El Cerrejón community) has been in production since 1981 via contracts with different companies (a Domi Prodeco Auxini consortium, Carbones del Caribe, and others). In 1995, Glencore acquired Prodeco S. A., creating Carbones del Cerrejón S. A. and then in 1997, Anglo American became involved in the business. In 2000, BHP Billiton became the third partner.
- The Oreganal Deposit (state-owned) was initially under concession to Carbones del Caribe by the national government. Then, in 1995, the concession passed to Oreganal S. A. which, in turn, ceded its shares to Carbones del Cerrejón S. A. in 1999.

==== Patilla Area ====
In 2001, after a public tender, this area was ceded to a consortium comprising Carbones del Cerrejón S. A. and Cerrejón Zona Norte S.A., which is currently concessioned to subsidiaries of BHP Billiton, Anglo American, and Xstrata.

=== Cerrejón South Zone ===
In 1997, after a tender process, the exploration and mining contract for this zone was awarded to the consortium now comprising subsidiaries of BHP Billiton, Anglo American, and Xstrata. Currently, the Cerrejón South Zone is under exploration.

== Description ==
Cerrejón was at one point the tenth largest coal mine in the world and the biggest in Latin America. Production started in 1985, when the mine was operated by Carbocol, a Colombian state company and Intercor, a subsidiary of ExxonMobil. The proven reserves in 2009 were 502,900,000 tonnes (495,000,000 long tons; 554,400,000 short tons) and the probable reserves 241,000,000 tonnes (237,000,000 long tons; 266,000,000 short tons). The coal is low-ash, low-sulphur bituminous coal, mined from the Paleocene Cerrejón Formation in the northeastern part (Cerrejón Sub-basin) of the Cesar-Ranchería Basin. The coal seams reach a thickness of 180 metres (590 ft). The total production in 2016 was 32,683,315 tonnes (32,167,132 long tons; 36,027,188 short tons).

== Operator ==
As of 2017 Cerrejón was owned in equal parts by subsidiaries of three international mining companies BHP, Anglo American and Glencore. These three companies sell the coal through their business named CMC, headquartered in Dublin.

The mine produces over 32×10^{6} tonnes (3.1×10^{7} long tons; 3.5×10^{7} short tons) of thermal coal a year and has estimated reserves of over five billion tonnes (4.9×10^{9} long tons; 5.5×10^{9} short tons). From 1985 to 2011, it produced 508.8 million tonnes of coal and generated US$2,006 million in royalties. In 2011 alone, sales generated US$336.60 million for the country as a whole and the region of La Guajira. By the end of 2011, it had reached a historical production figure of 32.03 million tonnes to the following markets: Europe (58%), the Mediterranean and Asia (21%), Central and South America (12%), and North America (9%). These external sales represent 40% of Colombia's coal sales and 4.6% of global coal sales.

== Integrated operation ==
The open-pit coal mine has maintenance workshops of over 26,000 square metres (280,000 sq ft).

=== Workforce ===
Carbones del Cerrejón's directly employed 5,373 workers (62% from La Guajira, 28% from other parts of the Caribbean coast, and 10% from the rest of the country). In addition, a further 4,497 workers are employed indirectly through contractor firms for the operation. Mushaisa Residential Unit offers complete infrastructure for housing, commercial shops, and services for 2,200 residents, 297 houses, 430 apartments, and a hotel for over 200 people. Albania School is a bilingual school with a very high ICFES ranking at 23 out of 12,273 educational institutions in the country.

=== Mining fleet ===
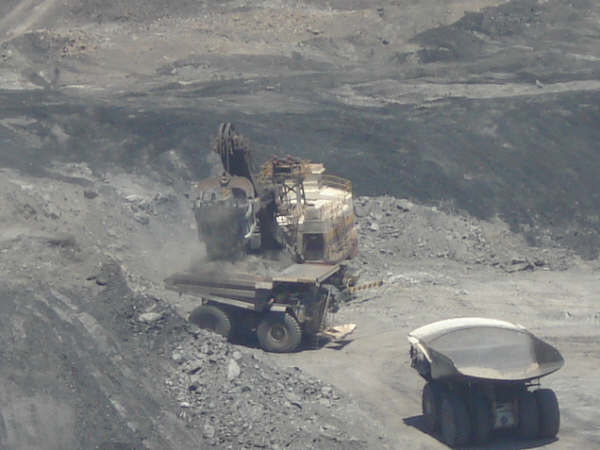
Mining operations at one of Cerrejón pits

Carbones del Cerrejón has a mining fleet comprising 493 pieces of equipment: 258 trucks with a load capacity of 190, 240, and 320 tonnes, 50 hydraulic shovels, and 185 pieces of auxiliary equipment. A 320 tonnes (310 long tons; 350 short tons) truck can haul a load equivalent to approximately 10 tractor trailers. In Colombia, a tractor trailer hauls 30 to 35 tonnes. A P&H 2800XPC shovel has a load capacity equivalent to the weight of 40 automobiles, that is, approximately 63.5 tonnes. A PC8000 shovel can manage a load equivalent to 50 automobiles, about 75.3 tonnes (74.1 long tons; 83.0 short tons).

=== Railway ===
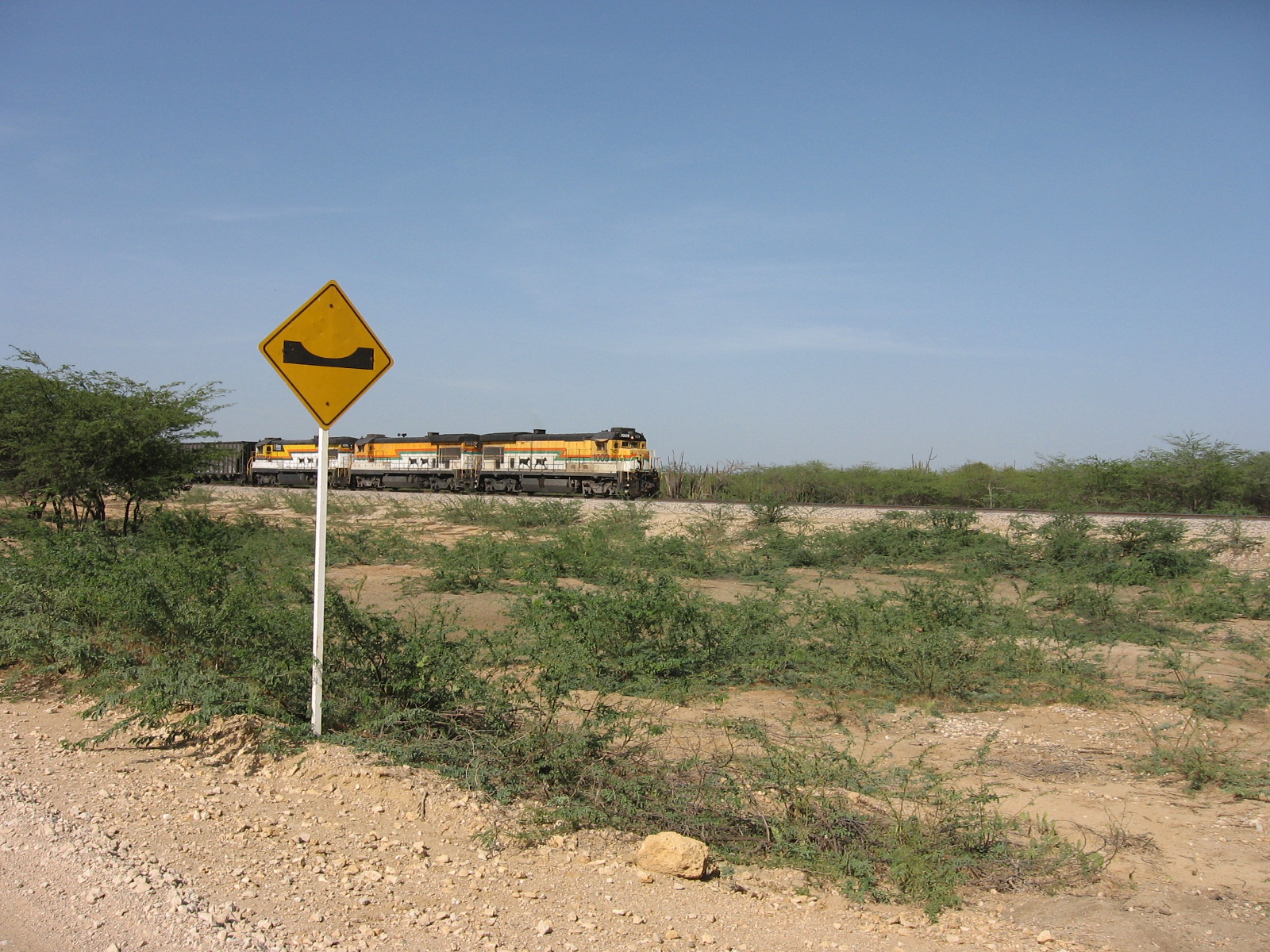
Coal train

The integrated railway line is 150 kilometres (93 mi) long. Each train can haul 109 freight wagons, each of which can carry 96 to 110 tonnes (94 to 108 long tons; 106 to 121 short tons) of coal. The Tren del Cerrejón connects the mine with Puerto Bolívar

=== Port ===
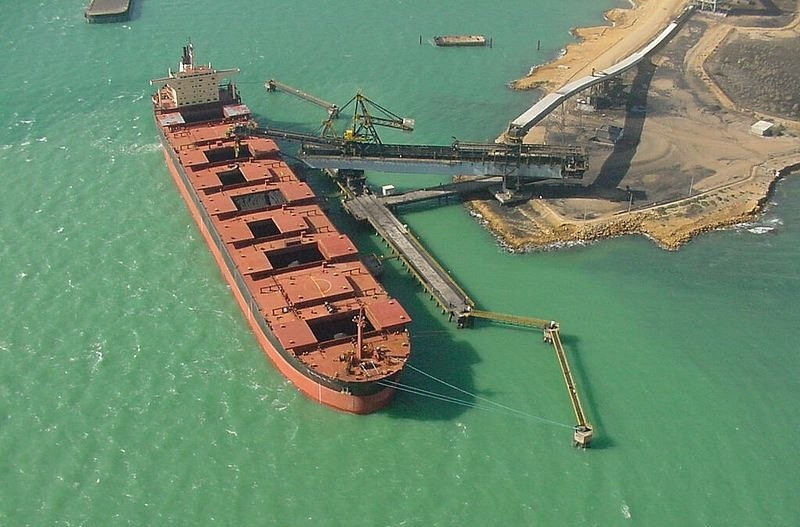
Bolívar Port

Puerto Bolívar 1,600 metres (5,200 ft) is the largest coal-export port in Latin America with covered conveyor belts and a direct-loading system since 1985, receives vessels of up to 180,000 tonnes (180,000 long tons; 200,000 short tons). The Puerto Bolívar shipping terminal loads bulk carrier ships of up to 180,000 tonnes (200,000 tons). The port also has a supply dock for ships of up to 70,000 tonnes which is used to supply machinery, spare parts, fuel, and other goods for the mining operation. The navigable channel is 19 metres (62 ft) deep, 225 metres (738 ft) wide, and 4 kilometres (2.5 mi). It is one of the largest coal maritime ports in South America with clean technology.

Airports 3,500 m (11,500 ft) of runway; Mine: 1,700 metres (5,600 ft). Mine-Puerto Bolívar Motorway. A motorway 150 km (93 mi) long for operational support and access for the population of La Guajira since 1982. It links the southern part of the department with the northern part.

== Extraction process ==
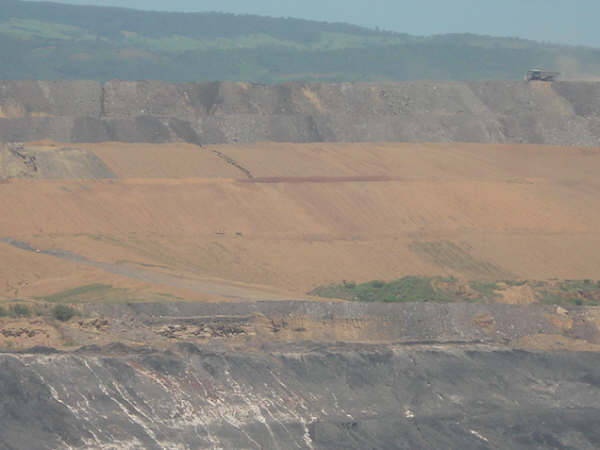
Overburden removal

The extraction process begins with the identification and relocation of wildlife in the area slated for intervention. Then the land is cleared and the topsoil is removed and stored in soil banks for the future reclamation of areas intervened by the mining operation. Subsequently, the area is drilled and explosives inserted for blasting so the hydraulic shovels can remove the overburden. This waste rock is loaded on 240-tonne and 320-tonne trucks and deposited in waste rock dump sites. Once the coal seams are exposed, the tractors pile up the coal and it is loaded onto 190-tonne trucks. The coal is taken to one of two crushing plants and piled in accordance with its quality and caloric value. The plant crushes the coal, and transports it via conveyor belt to the silos for loading in rail cars. The train travels 150 kilometres to Puerto Bolívar. At the unloading station, the train unloads the coal and conveyor belts transport it to the three stacker-reclaimers, which unload it to storage piles. It is later reclaimed and sent to the linear ship-loader, which places it in the holds of coal ships.

== Environmental and human rights concerns - Environmental Racism ==
In the ten years leading up to 2011, mining has been related to human rights violations related to environmental issues in Colombia. In June 2020, lawyers for the local Wayuu community lodged a request to the United Nations special rapporteur for human rights and the environment for work to be immediately halted over environmental and human rights concerns. In September 2020, several independent human rights experts for the UN called for the mining operations to be halted, citing the serious damage to the environment and the negative effects on the health and other rights of the indigenous peoples who live in the area.

The core pillars of structural determinants of health, defined by various health organizations, include: land and food system, legal system, educational system, and economic system. Beyond human rights concerns, the El Cerrejón mine in Colombia experiences environmental racism. The Human Rights Council 2022 report reveals that the systematic projects targeting marginalized communities are rooted in racism, discrimination, colonialism, patriarchy, impunity, and political systems that systematically ignore human rights. This concept is essential to understanding the forced displacement of Afro-Colombian and Indigenous Wayuu communities experienced since the beginning of the El Cerrejón project. Prioritizing economic maximization over the protection of local communities (their health and voice in legal systems that might offer asymmetric compensations) goes beyond a simple human rights issue. Existing research focused on environmental justice clearly connotes these issues.

== See also ==
- Puerto Bolivar Airport
- Cerrejón Formation
- Titanoboa, world's largest prehistoric snake, found in Cerrejón, among many other fossils
