= Daniel Robles =

Peruvian politician

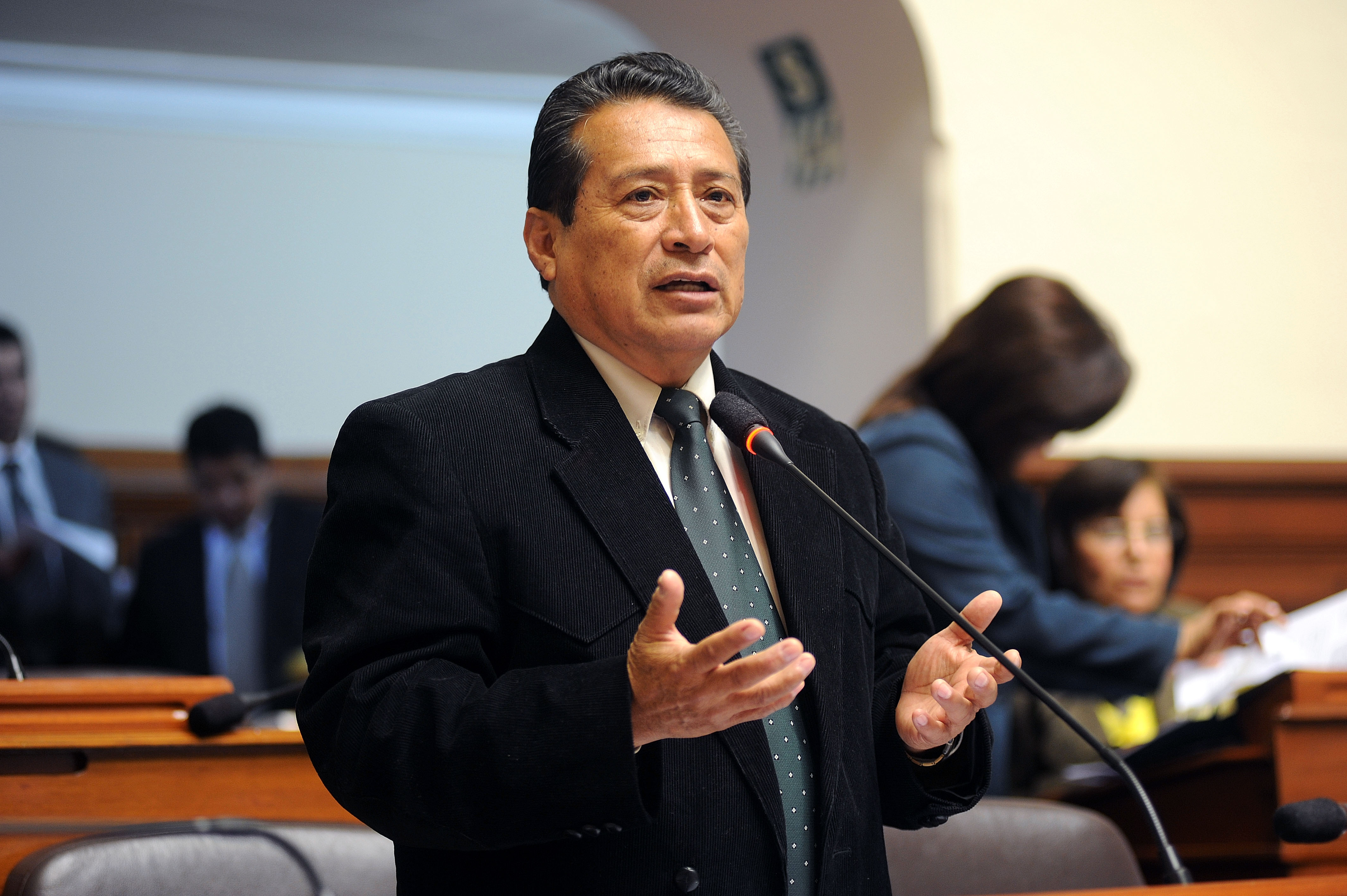
- Robles in 2010

Member of Congress
- In office 26 July 2001 – 26 July 2011
- Constituency: La Libertad

Personal details
- Born: Daniel Robles López; 10 February 1947 (age 79)
- Party: Peruvian Aprista Party
- Occupation: Politician

Daniel Robles López (born 10 February 1947) is a Peruvian politician and a former Congressman representing La Libertad for two terms from 2001 to 2011. Robles belongs to the Peruvian Aprista Party. He first ran for a seat in Congress in the 2000 elections, under the Peruvian Aprista Party, but he was not elected, attaining a low share of votes as the party only gained 5 seats. He was first elected in the 2001 elections representing La Libertad and was re-elected in the 2006 elections. He did not run for re-election in the 2011 elections and retired from politics.
