= Raquel Jiménez Cerrillo =

Mexican politician (born 1966)

- Born: 21 January 1966 (age 60); León, Guanajuato, Mexico
- Education: Universidad de Guanajuato; UAQ
- Occupation: Deputy
- Political party: PAN

Raquel Jiménez Cerrillo (born 21 January 1966) is a Mexican politician affiliated with the PAN. She served as Deputy of the LXII Legislature of the Mexican Congress representing Querétaro. Previously, she served as a local deputy in the Congress of Querétaro from 2003 to 2006.
