= José Luis Cerrillo =

Mexican politician (born 1952)

- Born: 9 December 1952 (age 73); Michoacán, Mexico
- Occupation: Politician
- Political party: PRI

José Luis Cerrillo Garnica (born 9 December 1952) is a Mexican politician from the Institutional Revolutionary Party. From 2007 to 2009 he served as Deputy of the LX Legislature of the Mexican Congress representing Michoacán.
