= Hatonuevo =

Coordinates: 11.0694°N 72.7669°W

- town
- Flag Coat of arms

- Location of the town and municipality of Hato Nuevo in the Department of La Guajira.
- Country: Colombia
- Region: Caribbean
- Department: La Guajira
- Foundation: 1840

Government
  - Mayor: Rafael Ángel Ojeda Brito

Area
  - Total: 347 km^{2} (134 sq mi)
- Elevation: 50 m (160 ft)

Population (2015)
  - Total: 24,910
- Time zone: UTC-5
- Climate: Aw
- Website: www.laguajira.gov.co/turismo/hatonuevo

Hatonuevo (Spanish pronunciation: [atoˈnweβo]), Spanish for New Herd, Is a town and municipality of the Colombian Department of La Guajira. A municipality of the La Guajira Department since 1994, it has a population of approximately 17,014 inhabitants, the majority of which being workers of El Cerrejon coal mine.

The town has an extension of 347 km^{2} and is located an altitude of 50 meters above sea level with an average temperature of 28 °C throughout the year. It is 75 km away from the capital of La Guajira Department, Riohacha.

== History ==
=== Coal mining ===
BHP and its joint venture partners, Anglo American and Glencore, became equal owners of the Cerrejon Zona Norte (CZN) coal mine in Colombia in February 2002, When they acquired International Colombia Resources Corporation (Intercor) from ExxonMobil, Which held the mine's remaining 50 per cent ownership and operational interests. A new company, Cerrejon Coal Company, was formed, combining CZN and Carbones del Cerrejon. Situated within the mining lease is the village of Tabaco. The acquisition has proceeded in accordance with Colombian law. As part of the legal process, a survey was conducted to determine whether the people of the village wanted to sell their possession rights or be relocated. The survey established that there were 213 possession rights in Tabaco, of which 8 were municipal public properties, 151 were unoccupied lands or houses and 54 were occupied dwellings.

Some 95% of the possessors said they did not want resettlement and wanted to negotiate directly. Subsequently, 192 out of 213 possession rights were settled; and acquisition of the 8 public properties was negotiated with the municipality of HN. In August 2001, the remaining 13 possession rights were acquired through an expropriation process ordered by national judges in accordance with the Colombian Mining Law. Court action was initiated on behalf of those people who had not agreed to sell their possession rights; and, in May 2002, the Colombian Supreme Court ordered that the municipality of HN provide primary education and housing infrastructure support for children of this group. While schooling is provided free to students, there are associated expenses for such items as educational materials. Following a review at the end of 2002, it was decided the funding should be provided directly to the schools attended by the children. Through the Fundación Nuestra Señora del Pilar, assistance has been given to the school in HN for a cafeteria and to the school in Patilla for school furniture and materials.

== Climate ==
Climate data for Hatonuevo (Mina La), elevation 80 m (260 ft), (1981–2010)
Month	Jan	Feb	Mar	Apr	May	Jun	Jul	Aug	Sep	Oct	Nov	Dec	Year
Mean daily maximum °C (°F)	32.2 (90.0)	32.7 (90.9)	33.6 (92.5)	34.0 (93.2)	34.1 (93.4)	34.5 (94.1)	34.9 (94.8)	35.4 (95.7)	34.4 (93.9)	33.1 (91.6)	31.9 (89.4)	31.5 (88.7)	33.6 (92.5)
Daily mean °C (°F)	27.4 (81.3)	27.9 (82.2)	28.7 (83.7)	29.1 (84.4)	29.1 (84.4)	29.5 (85.1)	29.9 (85.8)	29.8 (85.6)	28.7 (83.7)	27.9 (82.2)	27.5 (81.5)	27.1 (80.8)	28.6 (83.5)
Mean daily minimum °C (°F)	23.2 (73.8)	23.5 (74.3)	23.9 (75.0)	24.5 (76.1)	24.5 (76.1)	24.8 (76.6)	25.1 (77.2)	25.0 (77.0)	24.2 (75.6)	23.9 (75.0)	23.9 (75.0)	23.4 (74.1)	24.1 (75.4)
Average precipitation mm (inches)	10.7 (0.42)	5.4 (0.21)	12.2 (0.48)	70.0 (2.76)	115.6 (4.55)	51.5 (2.03)	60.4 (2.38)	88.6 (3.49)	148.9 (5.86)	146.4 (5.76)	164.1 (6.46)	64.1 (2.52)	937.9 (36.93)
Average precipitation days	3	2	2	6	10	8	6	10	14	15	13	7	95
Average relative humidity (%)	71	69	68	70	74	71	67	69	75	78	79	76	72
Mean monthly sunshine hours	263.5	223.0	220.1	195.0	186.0	219.0	241.8	229.4	192.0	195.3	201.0	244.9	2,611
Mean daily sunshine hours	8.5	7.9	7.1	6.5	6.0	7.3	7.8	7.4	6.4	6.3	6.7	7.9	7.2
Source: Instituto de Hidrologia Meteorologia y Estudios Ambientales
