= Riohacha =

District and city in La Guajira department, Colombia

- District and city
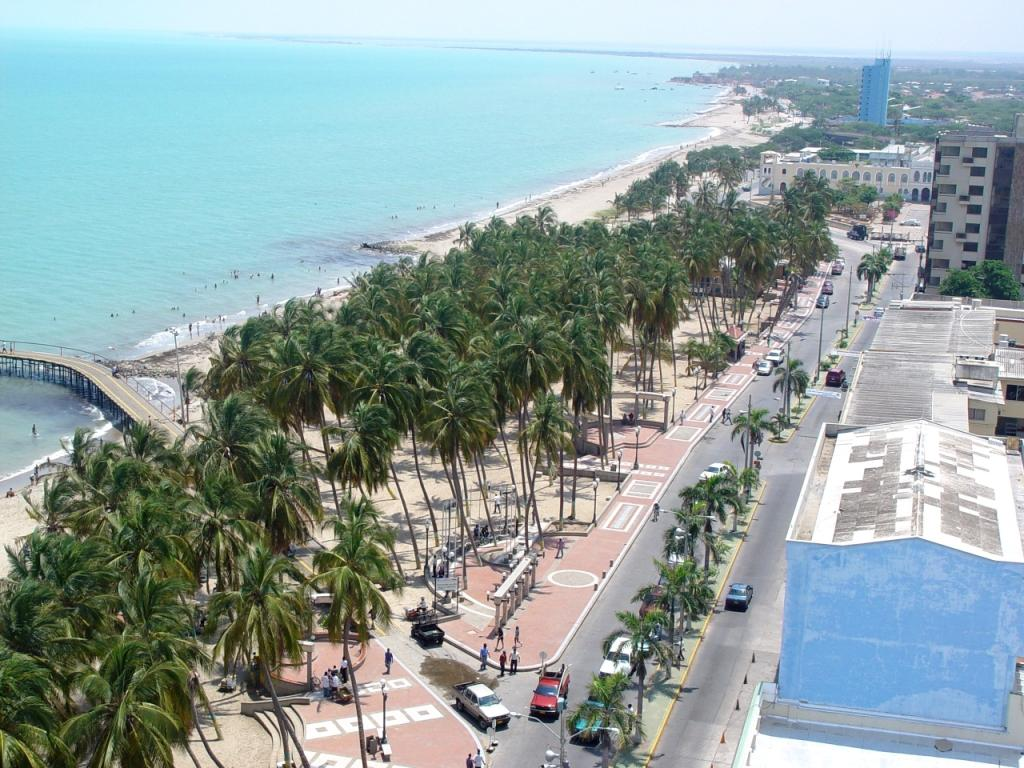
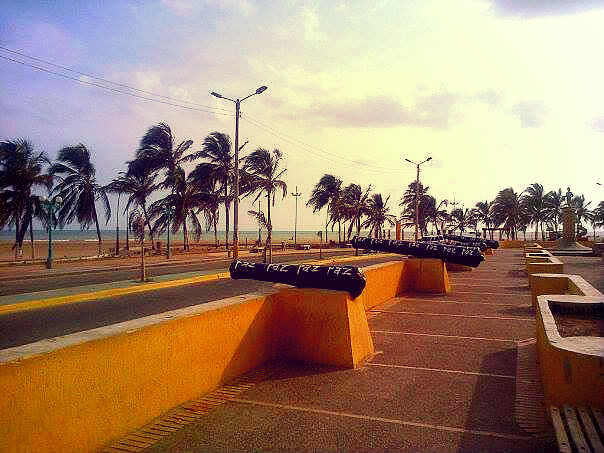
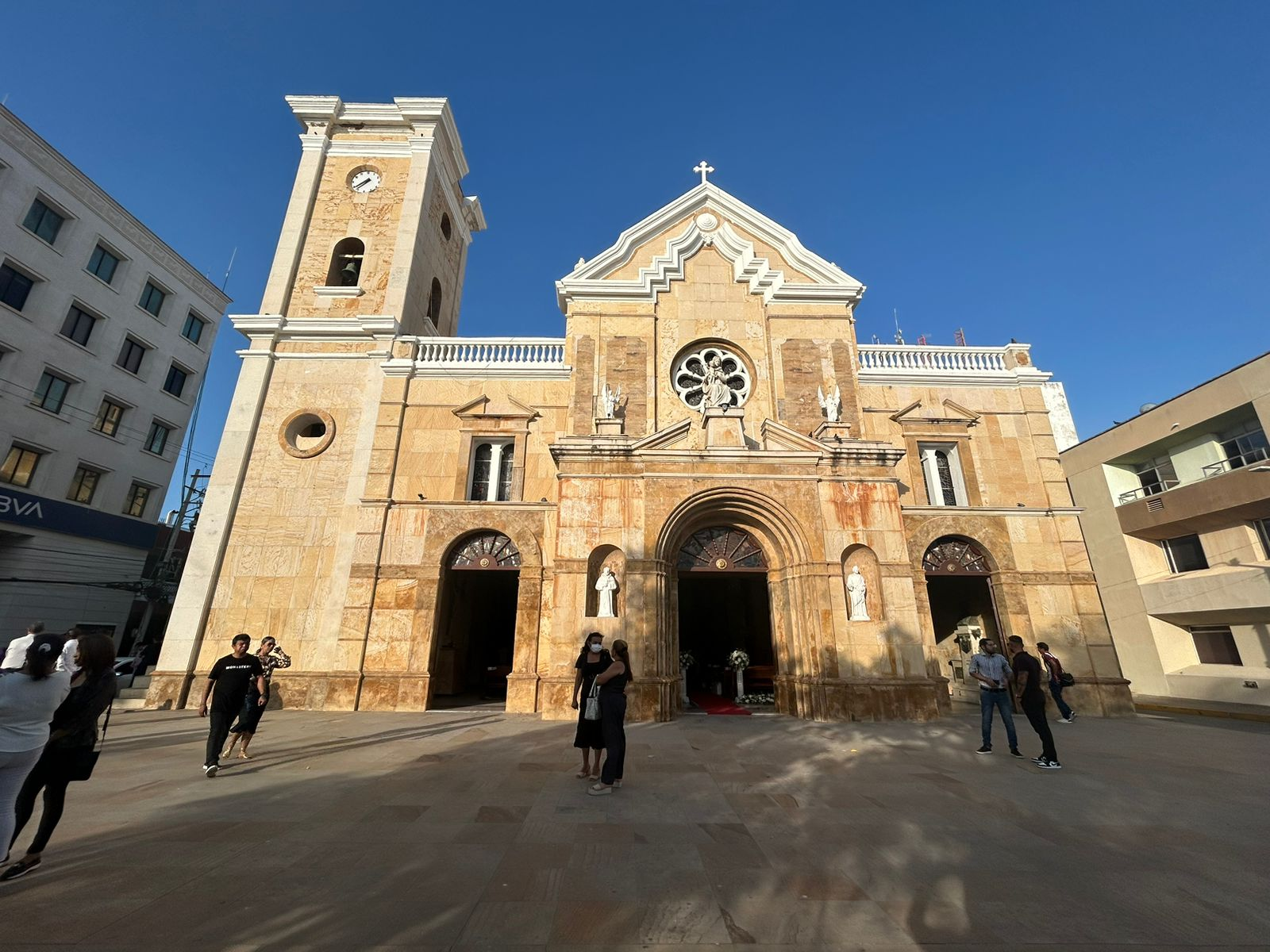
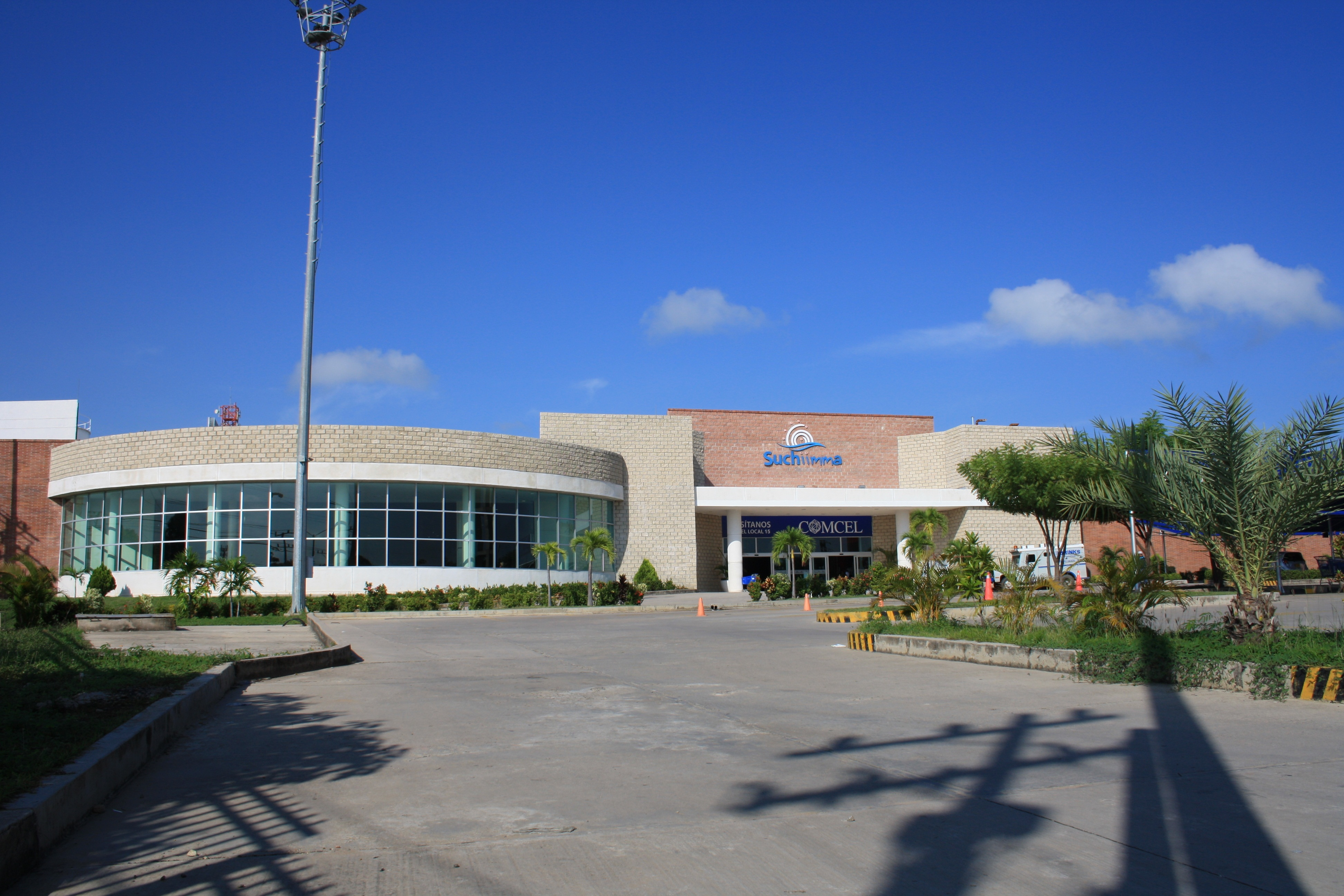
- From top to bottom: View of Riohacha beachfront, Canyon Park, Cathedral, Süchiimma Mall

- Flag Coat of arms

- Location of Riohacha in the Department of La Guajira. Municipality (red), city (black dot).

- Location within Colombia
- Coordinates: 11°32′39″N 72°54′25″W
- Country: Colombia
- Region: Caribbean
- Department: La Guajira
- Foundation: 1545
- Founder: Nikolaus Federmann

Government
  - Mayor: Rafael Ceballos Sierra (L)

Area
  - District and city: 3,120 km^{2} (1,200 sq mi)
  - Urban: 25.53 km^{2} (9.86 sq mi)
- Elevation: 5 m (16 ft)

Population (2023 Census)
  - District and city: 222,541
  - Density: 71.3/km^{2} (185/sq mi)
  - Urban: 126,103
  - Urban density: 4,939/km^{2} (12,790/sq mi)
- Time zone: UTC-05 (Eastern Time Zone)
- Postal code: 440001
- Area code: 57 + 5
- Climate: BSh
- Website: Official website (in Spanish)
- ^{*}Riohacha metropolitan area is yet to be determined.

Riohacha (Note: Also Rio Hacha and Rio de la Hacha (English: "river of the axe").) (Spanish pronunciation: [rjoˈa.tʃa]; Wayuu: Süchiimma (Note: English: "river land".)) is a city in the Riohacha Municipality in the northern Caribbean Region of Colombia by the mouth of the Ranchería River and the Caribbean Sea. It is the capital city of the La Guajira Department. It has a sandy beach waterfront.

Founded by conquistador Nikolaus Federmann in 1535, Riohacha was named after a local legend, "The legend of the Axe". Because of the powerful rain shadow of the Sierra Nevada de Santa Marta, the area is mostly desertic. It is inhabited primarily by Amerindians, predominantly the Wayuu ethnic group. During colonial times, Riohacha was a very important port, as divers could retrieve vast numbers of pearls from the harbor.

In the second half of the 20th century, the city developed as one of Colombia's medium important, maritime commercial ports. It is also a multicultural center for La Guajira Department. The city is mentioned several times in novels written by Colombian writer Gabriel García Márquez, who won the Nobel Prize in Literature. Among his important works are One Hundred Years of Solitude, Love in the Time of Cholera, and Chronicle of a Death Foretold.

== Place Name ==
The place name Riohacha has existed since the same period of the Spanish land conquest and colonization in La Guajira (1526-1536). There are three different hypotheses about its origin, all of them related to the exploration of the area of the mouth of a river in the middle part of the La Guajira Peninsula. The first hypothesis recounts the rescue that a young indigenous man makes of a lost and thirsty Spanish battalion, guiding them towards the encounter with the river; as a reward, the captain gives the native an axe and baptizes the place as El Río de La Hacha. The second hypothesis speaks of the same Spanish battalion whose Captain loses his emblematic axe when crossing said river; as a consolation he baptizes it Río de La Hacha. The third hypothesis documents the discovery of a beautiful axe buried on the river bank by a battalion of European explorers, who until now believed they were the first to arrive at that place. In this way, they called it Río de la Hacha.

The word Süchiimma means, in the Wayuunaiki language, Land of the River: Süchii (river) and Mma (land). The city is also known as Portal de Perlas (alluding to its pearl origin), the Capital of the Magical Arreboles (the most beautiful sunsets in the Colombian Caribbean) and the Mestiza del Nordeste (for its rich multiculturalism and the Trade Winds of the Northeast).

== History ==
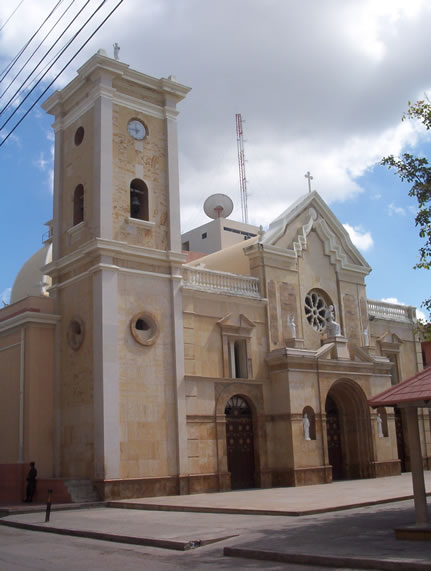
Cathedral of Riohacha

The Riohacha area was long inhabited by American Indians of the Wayuu culture, part of the larger Arawak group. The first European to visit the area was the Spanish sailor Alonso de Ojeda in 1498, though he never landed. A short time later, Juan de la Cosa, another Spanish explorer, landed on what is today called Cabo de la Vela (Cape of the Sail, so called because of its shape). In 1535, the German explorer Nikolaus Federmann founded a city with the name Nuestra Señora Santa Maria de los Remedios del Cabo de la Vela (Our Lady Saint Mary of the Remedies of the Cape of the Sail) at the place where de la Cosa had landed.

The Spanish discovered a vast amount of pearls in the city's area. This treasure frequently attracted raids by pirates. After the city was destroyed by a pirate raid, the city government relocated the city to the mouth of the Ranchería River, in order to confuse the pirates, and to give the city time to rebuild before the next attack. The new city, named Nuestra Señora de los Remedios del Río de la Hacha (Our Lady of the Remedies), expanded peacefully for a short time in its new location. Pirate attacks soon resumed. By 1564 British pirates led by John Hawkins forced the Rio Hacha settlers to buy his cargo of African slaves and goods despite the trade was prohibited. He carried out a fake threat of force with the local governor's collusion as part of the Triangular trade. 1566: John Lovell attacked Rio Hacha. In 1568 John Hawkins and his second cousin Francis Drake attacked Rio Hacha again, forcing residents to buy his cargo. This included some of the 400 Africans he had captured and enslaved in West Africa. The next major attack, led by the English privateer Francis Drake, took place in 1596, when Drake pillaged the city searching for gold and pearls.

In the 18th century, Riohacha was incorporated to the Viceroyalty of New Granada as part of the province of Santa Marta. During the battles for independence from Spain, the port of Riohacha served many vessels fighting for Colombian and Venezuelan independence. Many Riohachans also served in the revolutionary navy, most notably Admiral José Prudencio Padilla, who would come to be considered a hero in the revolutions of Colombia and Venezuela.

In 1954, Riohacha City acquired municipality status, and in 1964 was declared capital of the new La Guajira Department.

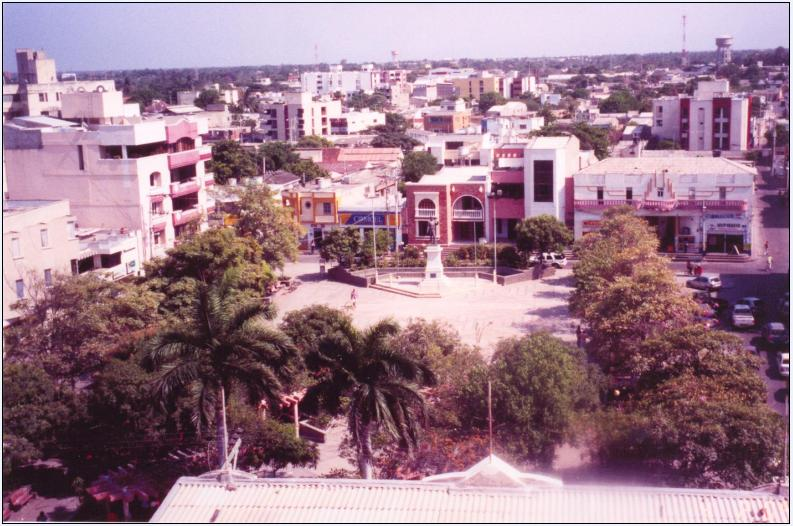
The Almirante Padilla Plaza in downtown Riohacha.

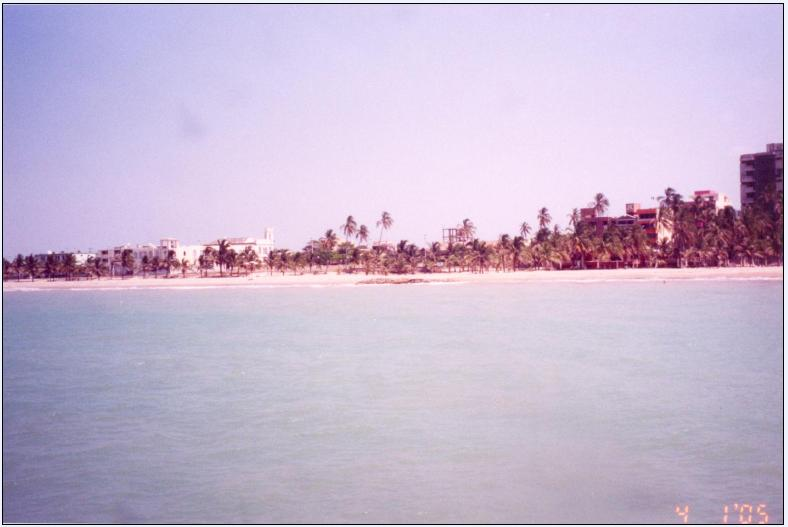
Riohacha Beach.

== Culture ==
- The National Festival of the Dividivi is celebrated every year from June 29 to July 1. The last day celebrates the creation of the Department of La Guajira.

== Transportation ==
Riohacha has one airport, the Almirante Padilla Airport. It serves airlines covering the route to and from the Colombian capital city Bogotá, the near cities of Valledupar and Santa Marta, and the Caribbean resort island of Aruba. In September 2016 the low-cost carrier Easy Fly initiated service between Riohacha and Barranquilla.

== Climate ==
Riohacha, owing to the rain shadow of the Sierra Nevada de Santa Marta, has a semi-arid climate (Köppen BSh), being too dry to be considered as a tropical savanna climate or a humid subtropical climate which owing to the extremely torrid temperatures is not that far above an arid climate despite receiving as much as 746 millimetres (29.37 in) of rainfall per year. In stark contrast to temperate climates with even less rainfall that maintain lush environments, the hot temperatures cause a steppe-like environment. The rain falls almost exclusively in May and between August and November, and for the rest of the year there are a mere thirteen wet days out of 212 in an average year. Despite the lack of rainfall, humidity is high year round and adds to the uncomfortable heat.

Climate data for Riohacha (Almirante Padilla Airport), elevation 4 m (13 ft), (1981–2010)
Month	Jan	Feb	Mar	Apr	May	Jun	Jul	Aug	Sep	Oct	Nov	Dec	Year
Record high °C (°F)	39.2 (102.6)	36.7 (98.1)	39.8 (103.6)	38.4 (101.1)	38.0 (100.4)	38.6 (101.5)	38.1 (100.6)	38.8 (101.8)	39.4 (102.9)	36.6 (97.9)	35.8 (96.4)	38.6 (101.5)	39.4 (102.9)
Mean daily maximum °C (°F)	32.5 (90.5)	32.6 (90.7)	32.8 (91.0)	33 (91)	33.5 (92.3)	34.5 (94.1)	35.2 (95.4)	35.1 (95.2)	33.7 (92.7)	32.8 (91.0)	32.2 (90.0)	32.4 (90.3)	33.4 (92.1)
Daily mean °C (°F)	27.1 (80.8)	27.2 (81.0)	27.4 (81.3)	28.0 (82.4)	28.8 (83.8)	29.7 (85.5)	29.9 (85.8)	29.5 (85.1)	28.5 (83.3)	28.0 (82.4)	27.7 (81.9)	27.3 (81.1)	28.3 (82.9)
Mean daily minimum °C (°F)	22.3 (72.1)	22.7 (72.9)	23.5 (74.3)	24.5 (76.1)	25.2 (77.4)	25.6 (78.1)	25.6 (78.1)	25.3 (77.5)	24.5 (76.1)	24.0 (75.2)	23.6 (74.5)	23.0 (73.4)	24.2 (75.6)
Record low °C (°F)	17.2 (63.0)	17.0 (62.6)	17.0 (62.6)	17.2 (63.0)	20.8 (69.4)	20.0 (68.0)	17.2 (63.0)	19.8 (67.6)	19.2 (66.6)	20.0 (68.0)	18.8 (65.8)	16.8 (62.2)	16.8 (62.2)
Average precipitation mm (inches)	3.7 (0.15)	1.6 (0.06)	5.5 (0.22)	31.3 (1.23)	75.9 (2.99)	51.2 (2.02)	36.8 (1.45)	80.0 (3.15)	142.6 (5.61)	148.8 (5.86)	75.6 (2.98)	31.0 (1.22)	704.1 (27.72)
Average precipitation days	1	1	1	4	8	4	3	6	10	11	7	3	57
Average relative humidity (%)	72	70	72	74	74	69	66	72	78	80	80	75	73
Mean monthly sunshine hours	263.5	228.7	232.5	201.0	195.3	234.0	260.4	251.1	207.0	207.7	216.0	241.8	2,739
Mean daily sunshine hours	8.5	8.1	7.5	6.7	6.3	7.8	8.4	8.1	6.9	6.7	7.2	7.8	7.5
Source: Instituto de Hidrologia Meteorologia y Estudios Ambientales

Climate data for Riohacha (Matitas), elevation 20 m (66 ft), (1981–2010)
Month	Jan	Feb	Mar	Apr	May	Jun	Jul	Aug	Sep	Oct	Nov	Dec	Year
Mean daily maximum °C (°F)	32.9 (91.2)	32.9 (91.2)	33.5 (92.3)	33.9 (93.0)	34.0 (93.2)	34.6 (94.3)	35.2 (95.4)	35.3 (95.5)	34.4 (93.9)	33.1 (91.6)	32.5 (90.5)	32.3 (90.1)	33.8 (92.8)
Daily mean °C (°F)	26.6 (79.9)	26.8 (80.2)	27.3 (81.1)	27.6 (81.7)	27.7 (81.9)	28.4 (83.1)	28.9 (84.0)	28.5 (83.3)	27.7 (81.9)	27.1 (80.8)	27.1 (80.8)	26.7 (80.1)	27.5 (81.5)
Mean daily minimum °C (°F)	21.2 (70.2)	21.5 (70.7)	21.4 (70.5)	22.3 (72.1)	23.1 (73.6)	23.9 (75.0)	24.0 (75.2)	23.7 (74.7)	23.1 (73.6)	23.0 (73.4)	22.8 (73.0)	21.8 (71.2)	22.6 (72.7)
Average precipitation mm (inches)	14.5 (0.57)	5.8 (0.23)	16.7 (0.66)	92.8 (3.65)	155.4 (6.12)	81.3 (3.20)	46.7 (1.84)	127.3 (5.01)	200.2 (7.88)	232.1 (9.14)	171.5 (6.75)	41.9 (1.65)	1,186.2 (46.70)
Average precipitation days	2	1	2	7	10	6	4	8	12	13	10	4	73
Average relative humidity (%)	77	76	76	78	82	78	75	78	83	84	83	81	79
Mean monthly sunshine hours	235.6	194.8	179.8	147.0	164.3	207.0	232.5	223.2	183.0	182.9	195.0	220.1	2,365.2
Mean daily sunshine hours	7.6	6.9	5.8	4.9	5.3	6.9	7.5	7.2	6.1	5.9	6.5	7.1	6.5
Source: Instituto de Hidrologia Meteorologia y Estudios Ambientales

== Notable people ==
- Luis Antonio Robles Suárez, first Afro-Colombian lawyer and politician.
- Junior Bueno, footballer
- José Prudencio Padilla, militar and naval hero.

== Gallery ==
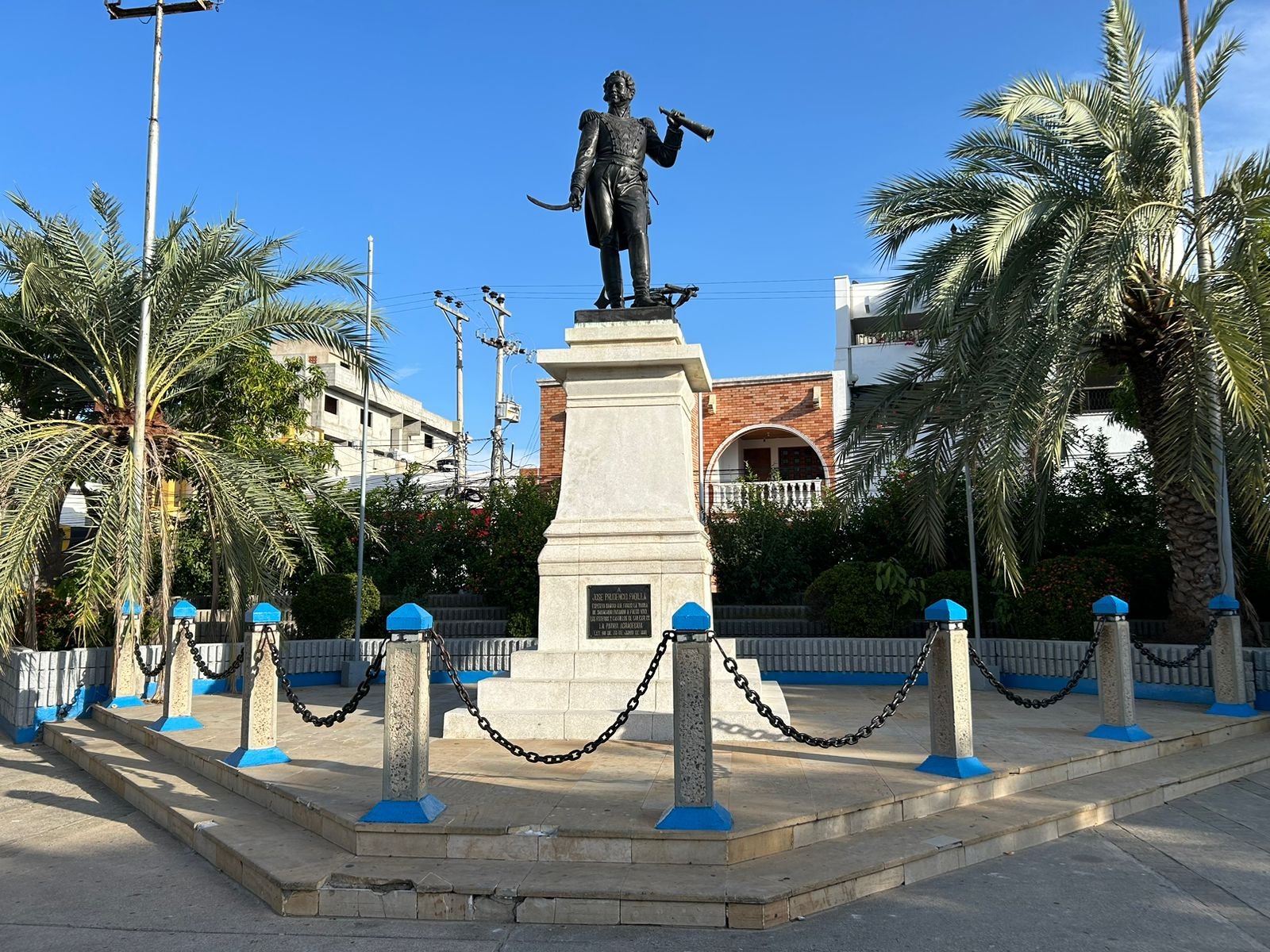
José Prudencio Padilla square

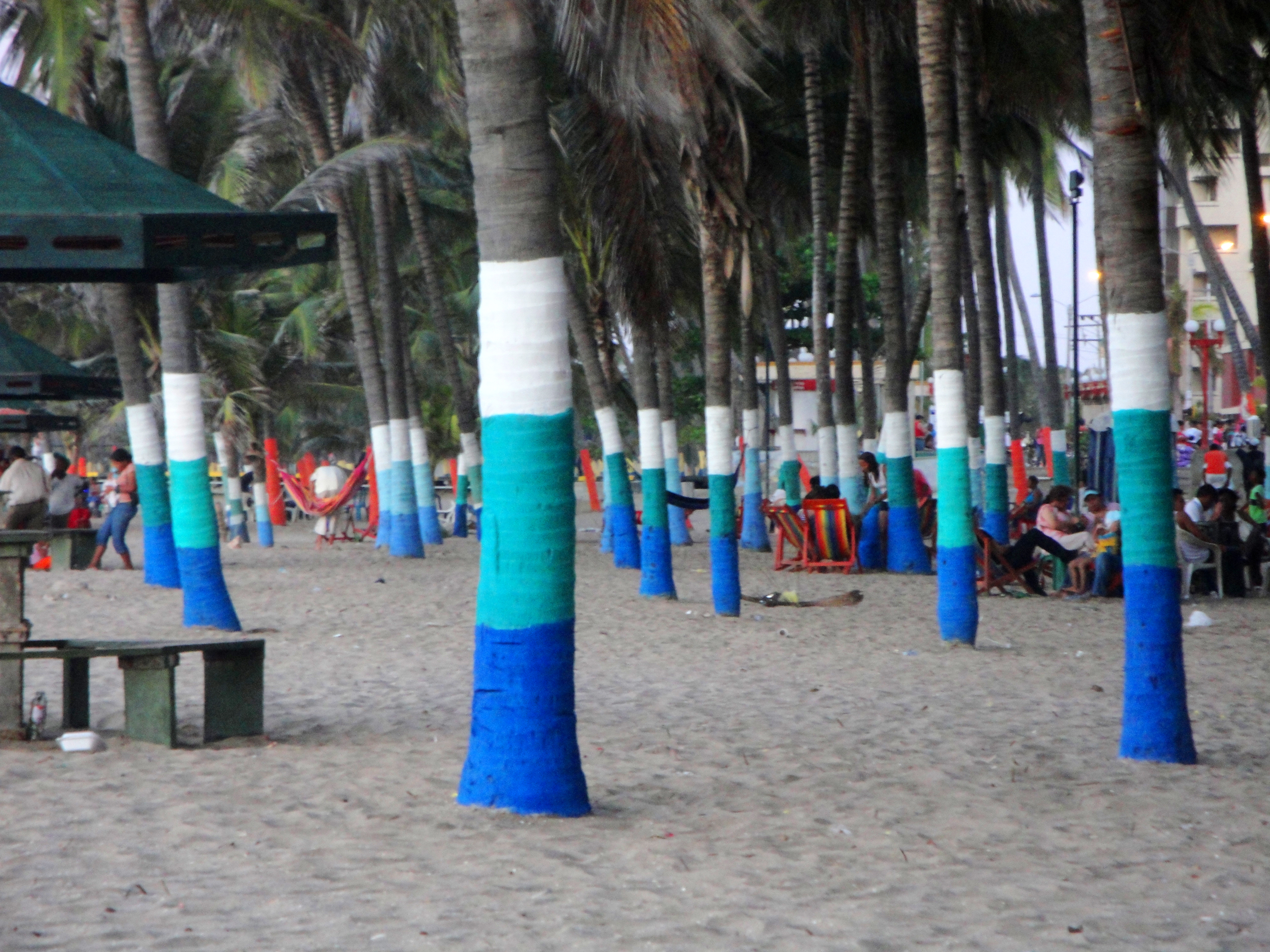
Malecon Beach

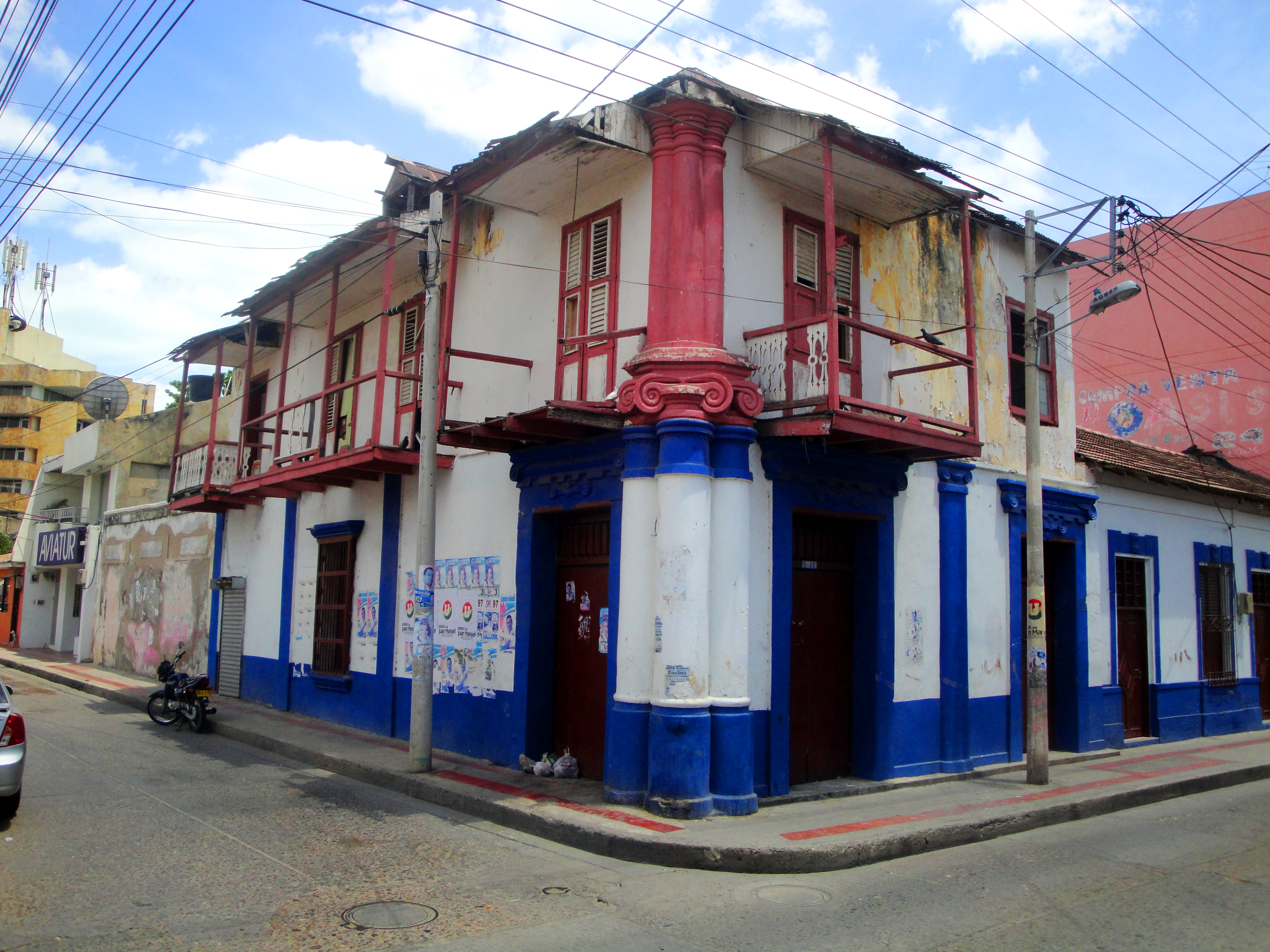
Typical building

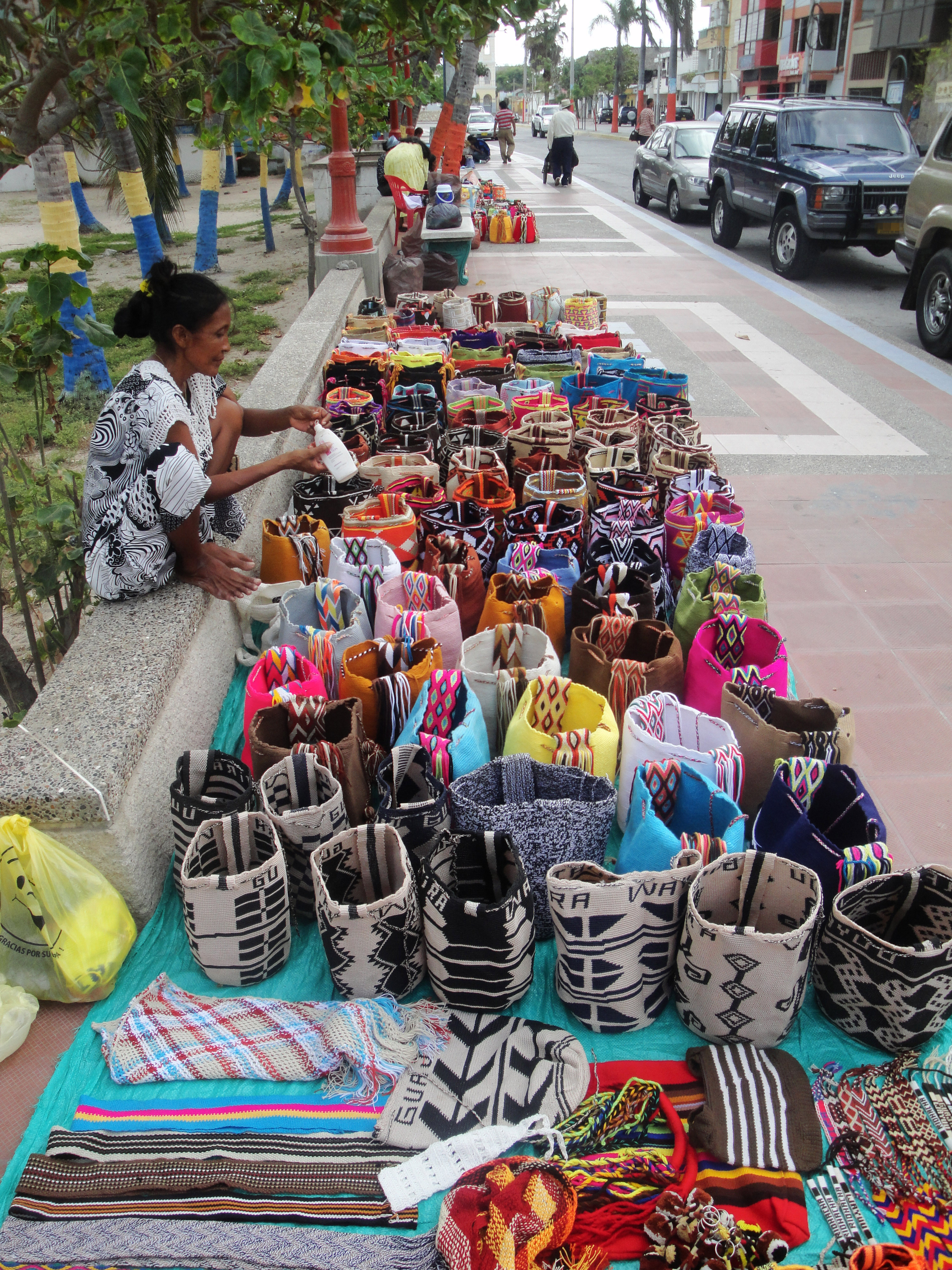
Colombian Wayuu crafts on Avenida Primera (1st Ave.)

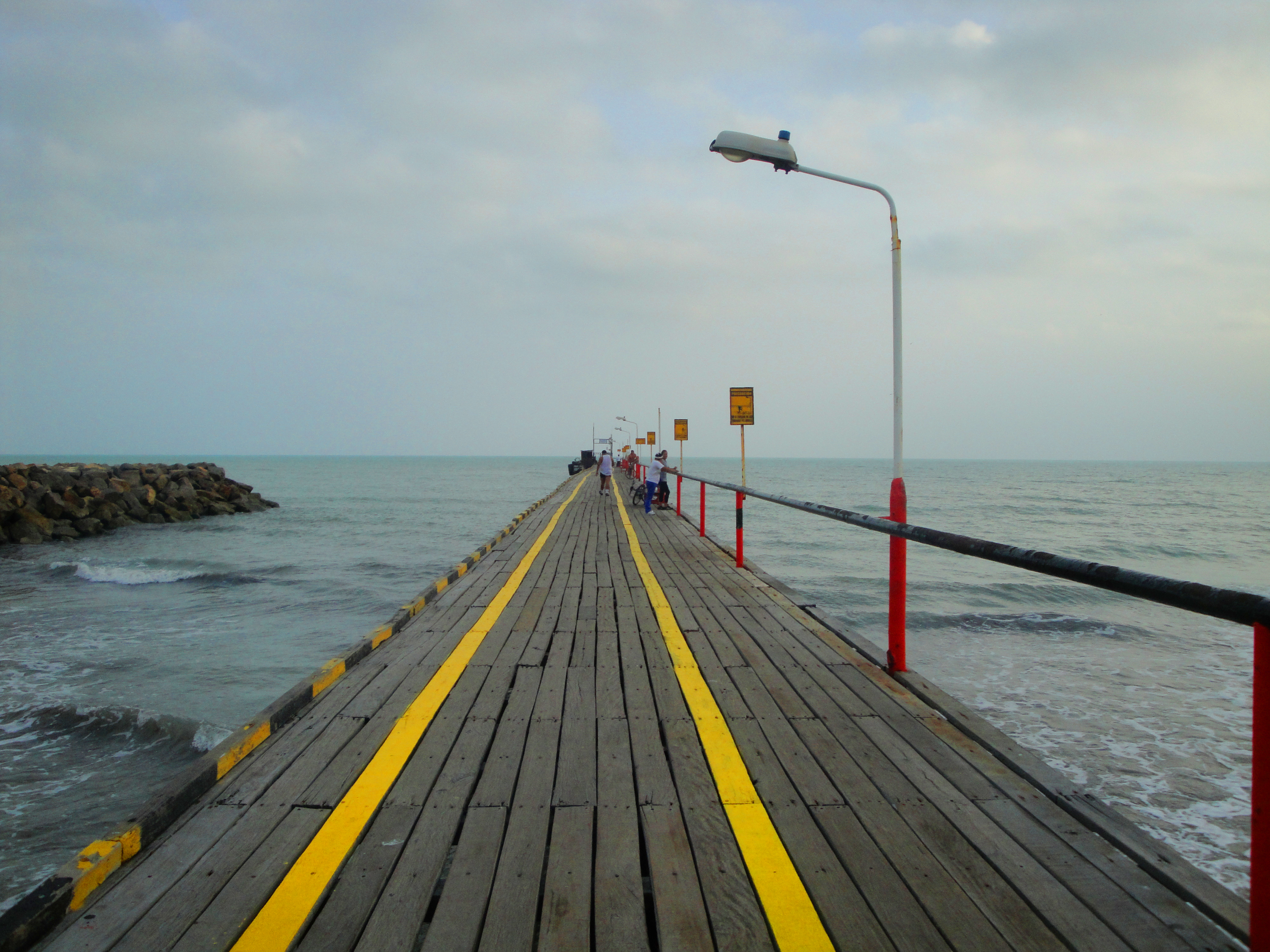
Riohacha's Touristic Dock

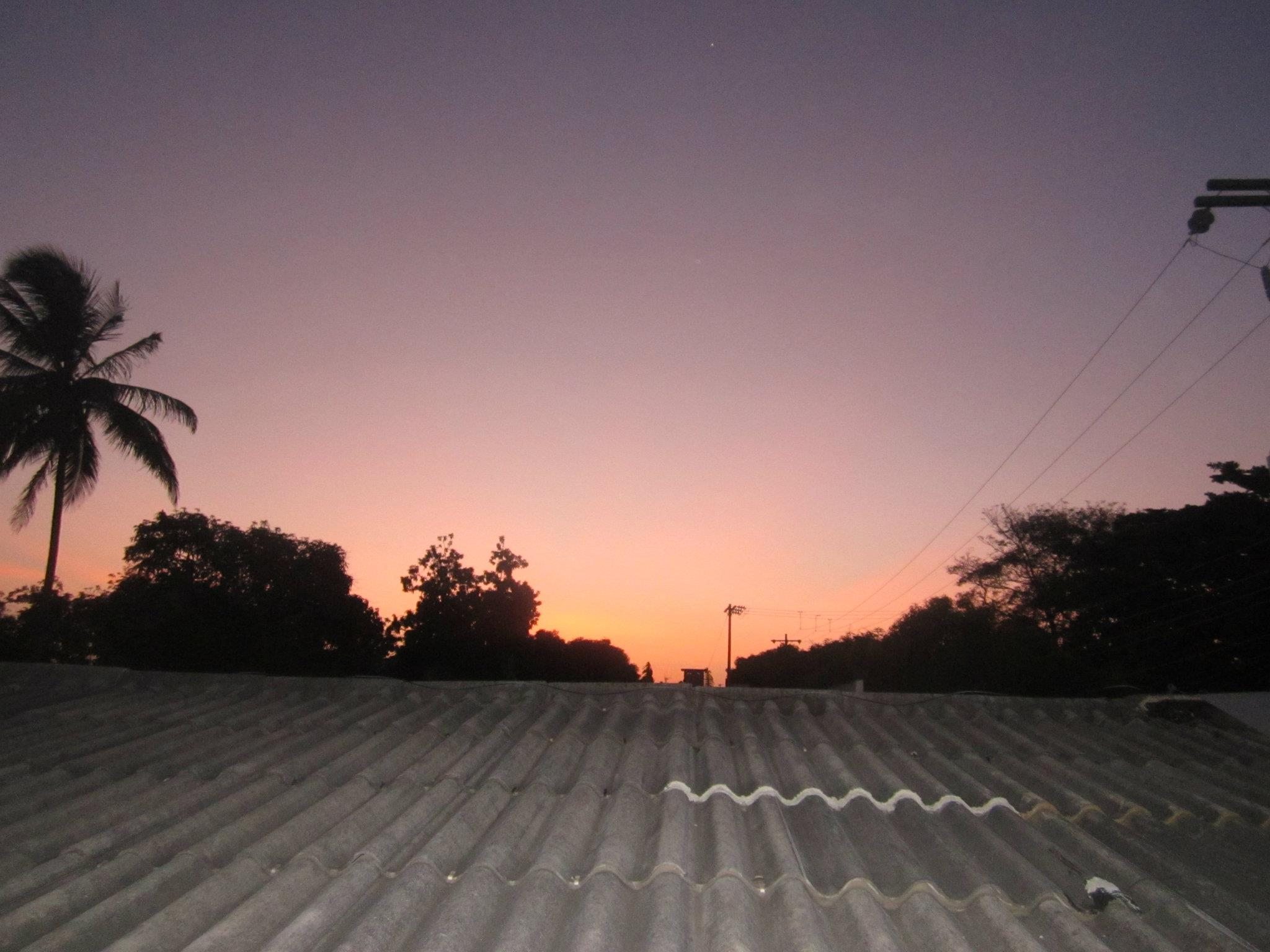
Riohacha's sunrise from a rooftop

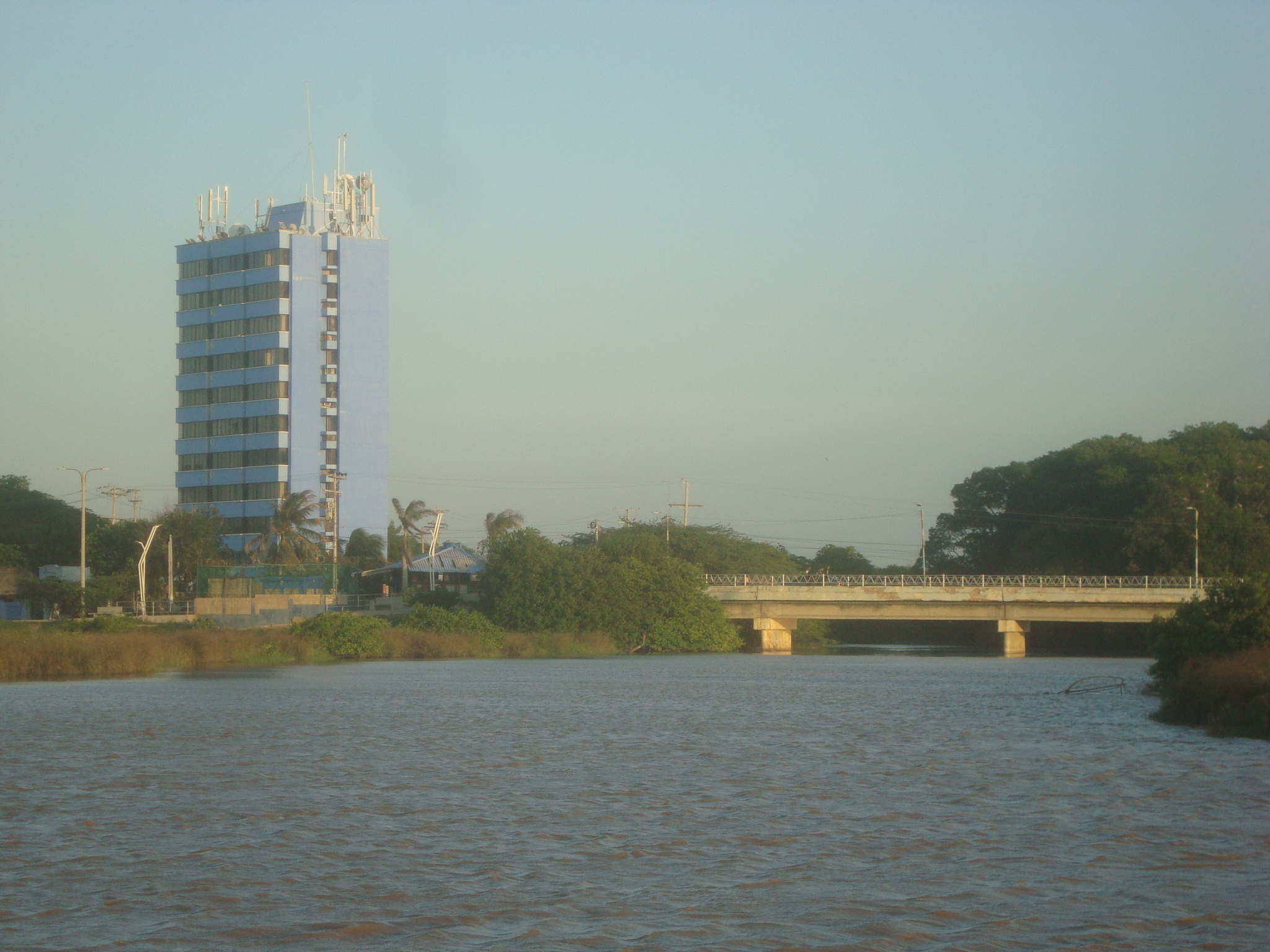
Ranchería River emptying into Riohacha

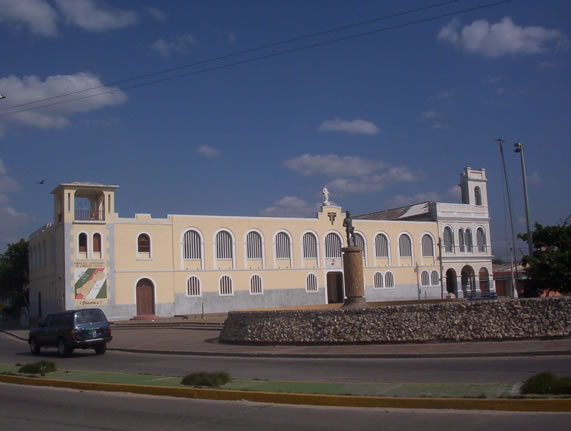
Former capuchin convent

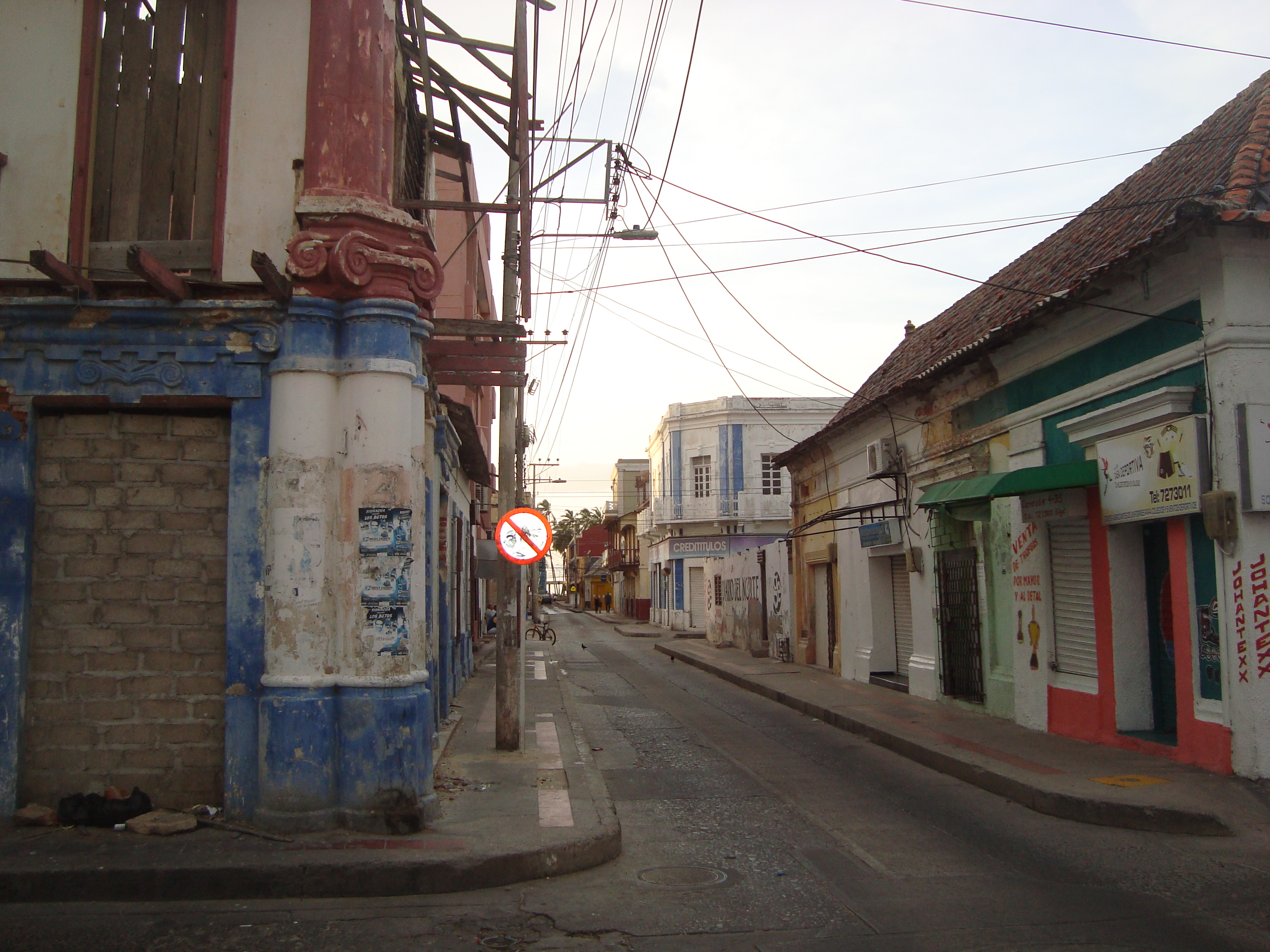
One of the streets of the historic city center

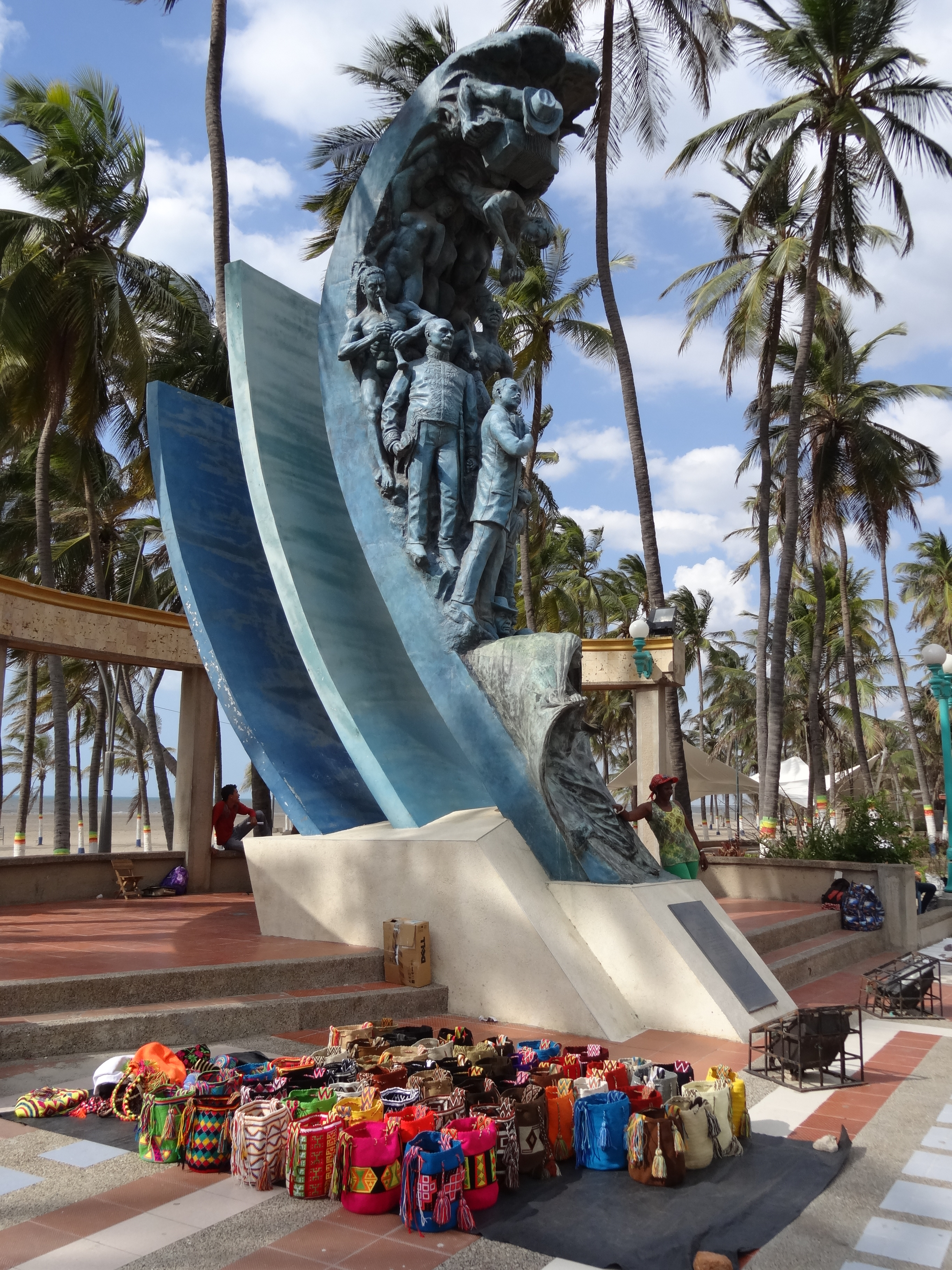
Identidad Monument, erected in 2010

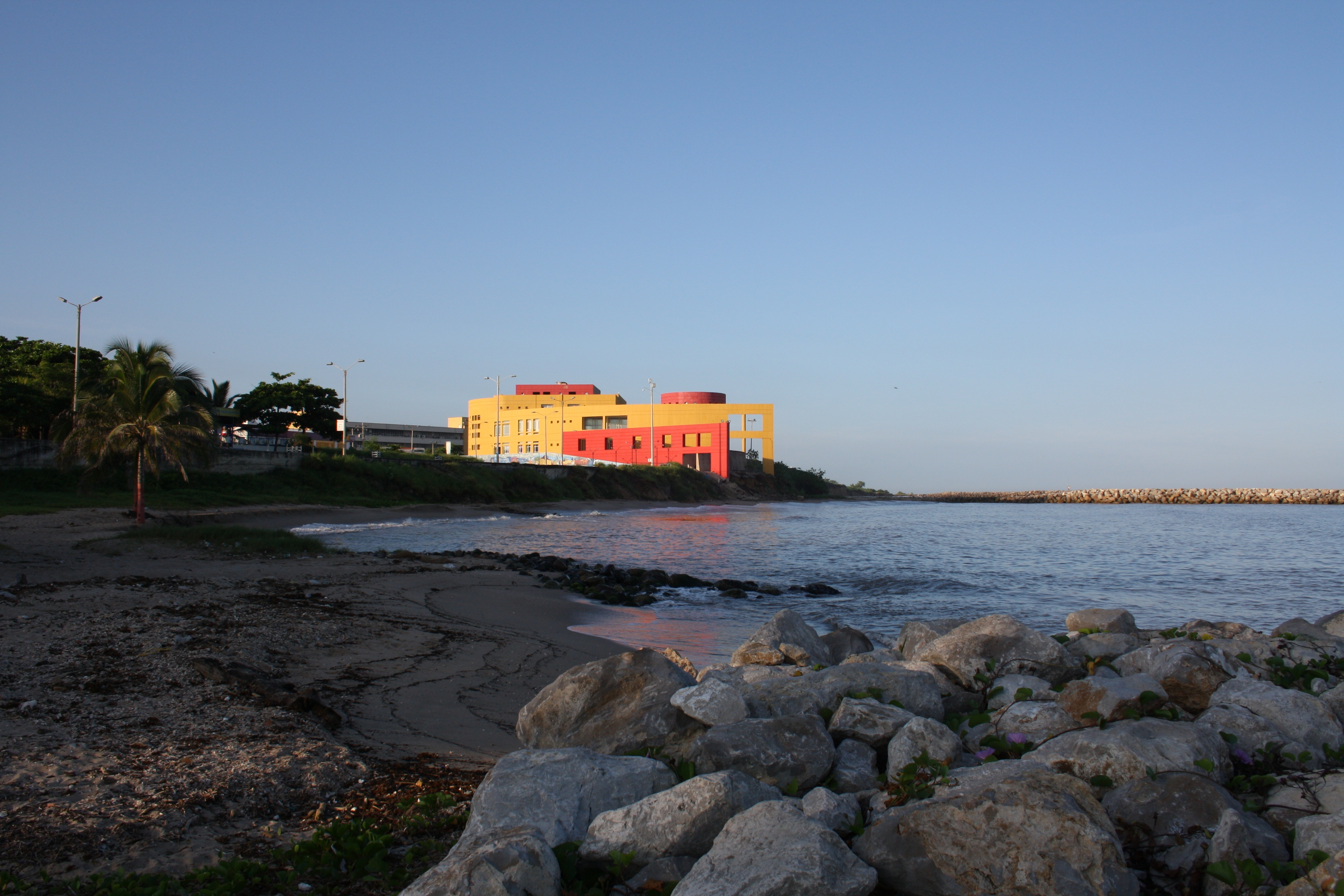
Departmental Cultural Center, seen from the beach

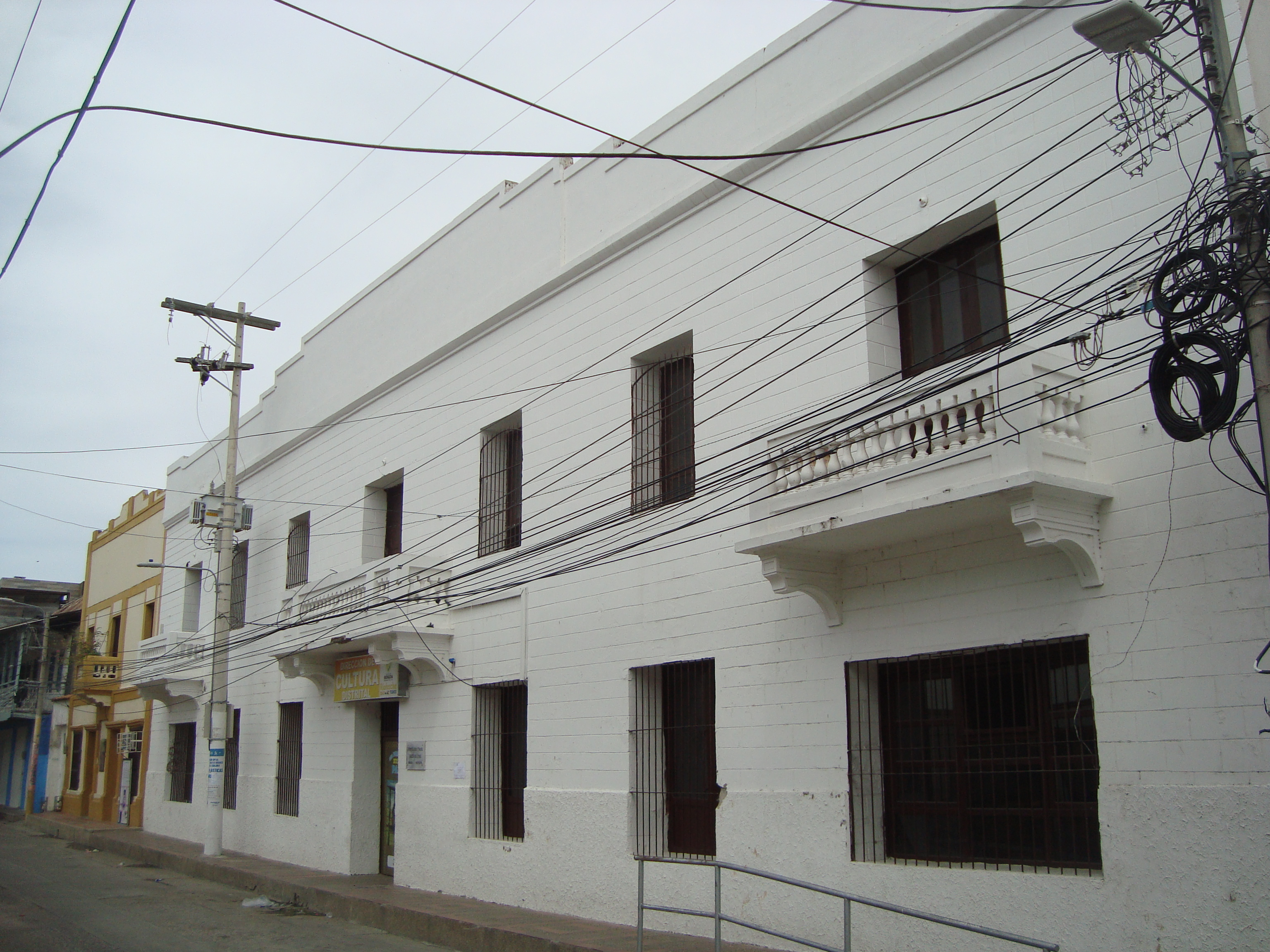
Late 19th-century structure

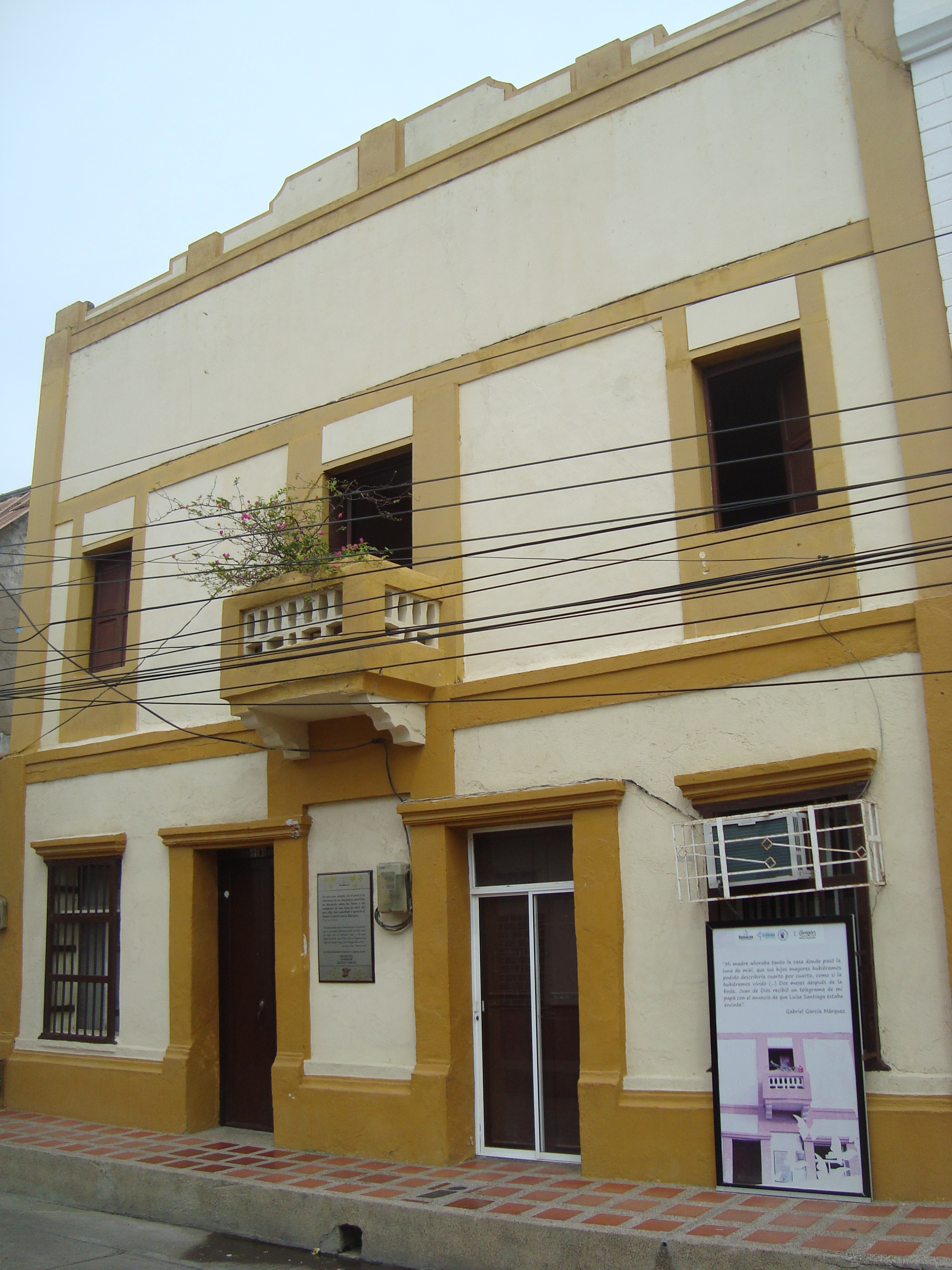
House where Gabriel García Márquez was conceived, according to his autobiography Living to Tell the Tale (2002)

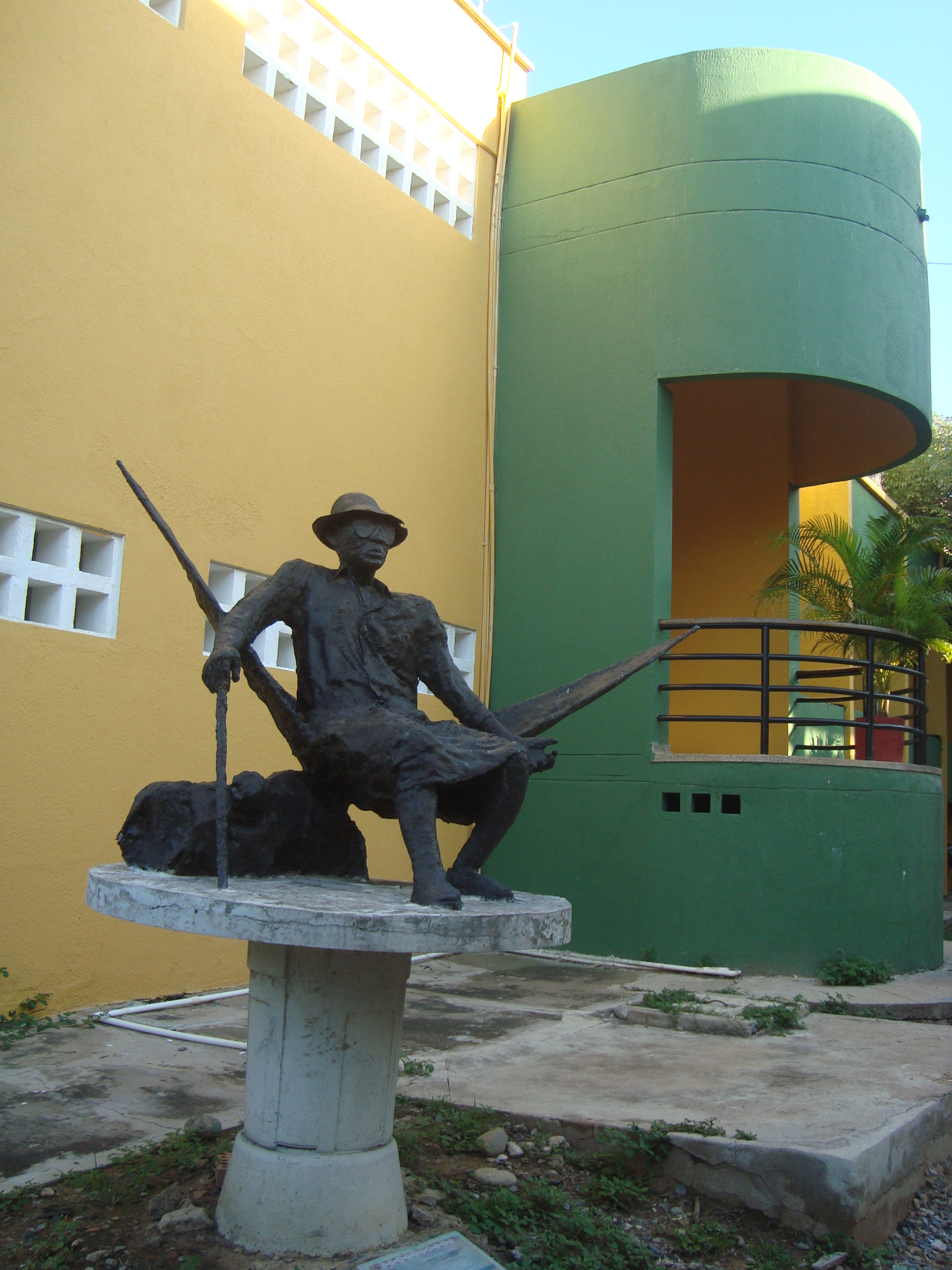
La Guajira University, located in Riohacha

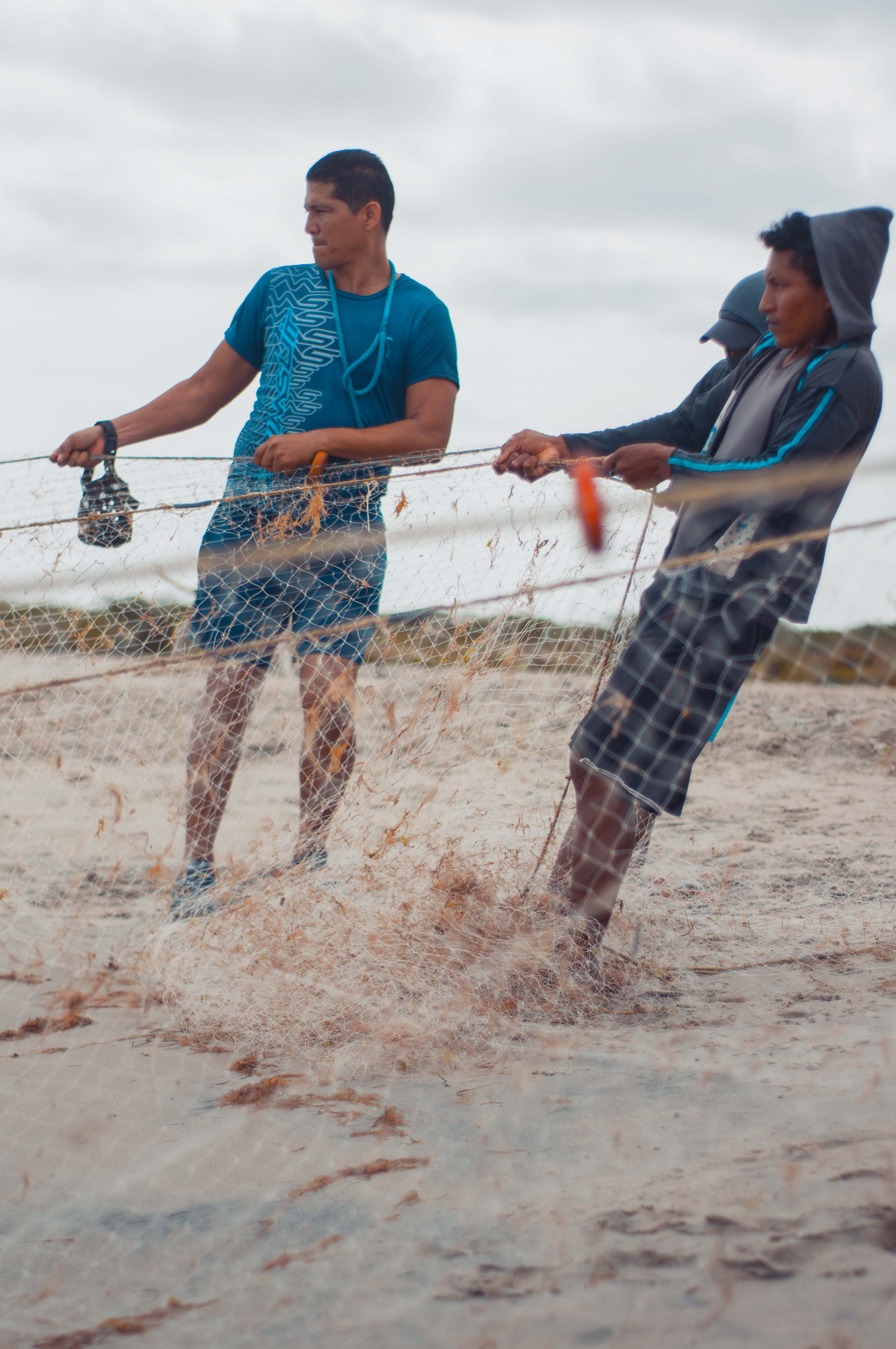
Fishing between Alijuna and Wayú Caribbean coast, Riohacha
