= La Guajira (disambiguation) =

La Guajira may refer to:

- La Guajira Peninsula, a peninsula in the northernmost part of South America shared by Colombia and Venezuela
- La Guajira Department, a department of Colombia which includes most of the Guajira Peninsula
- La Guajira Desert, a desert which covers most of the Guajira Peninsula

== See also ==
- Guajira (disambiguation)
- La Guajira terrane
