= Guajira =

Guajira may refer to:

- Guajira Peninsula, a peninsula in the northernmost part of South America shared by Colombia and Venezuela
- Guajiro people (Wayuu), a South American ethnic group inhabiting northeastern Colombia and northwestern Venezuela
- guajiro bean (also known as the kapeshuna bean), a set of heirloom cultivars of the cowpea grown mainly in northeastern Colombia
- La Guajira Department, a department of Colombia which includes most of the Guajira Peninsula
- La Guajira Desert, a desert which covers most of the Guajira Peninsula
- Guajira (music), a style of Cuban music, song or dance
- Guajira (TV series), a Colombian telenovela
- "Guajira", a song in Santana (1971 album)
- Guajira (flamenco), a flamenco palo or traditional music style

== See also ==
- La Guajira (disambiguation)
