= Bahia Honda =

Bahia Honda or Bahía Honda (meaning "Deep Bay" in Spanish) may refer to:

- Bahia Honda Key in the U.S. state of Florida
- Bahía Honda, Cuba, in the province of Artemisa
- Bahía Honda (Colombia), a bay in La Guajira, Colombia
- Honda Bay, Philippines, a bay in Palawan, Philippines
- Bahía Honda, Los Santos, a corregimiento in Panama
- Bahía Honda, Veraguas, a corregimiento in Panama
