= Conus gibsonsmithorum =

Scientific classification
- Kingdom: Animalia
- Phylum: Mollusca
- Class: Gastropoda
- Subclass: Caenogastropoda
- Order: Neogastropoda
- Superfamily: Conoidea
- Family: Conidae
- Genus: Conus
- Species: C. gibsonsmithorum

Binomial name
- Conus gibsonsmithorum Petuch, 1986

Synonyms
- Conus (Dauciconus) gibsonsmithorum Petuch, 1986 · accepted, alternate representation; Gradiconus gibsonsmithorum (Petuch, 1986)

Species of sea snail

Conus gibsonsmithorum is a species of sea snail, a marine gastropod mollusk in the family Conidae, the cone snails, cone shells or cones.

These snails are predatory and venomous. They are capable of stinging humans.

== Description ==
The size of the shell varies between 20 mm and 46 mm.

== Distribution ==
Locus typicus: Cabo de la Vela, Guajira Peninsula, Colombia.

North coast of South America: continental shelf.

Caribbean Sea off Colombia to Venezuela.
