= List of shipwrecks in July 1857 =

The list of shipwrecks in July 1857 includes ships sunk, wrecked or otherwise lost during July 1857.

== 1 July ==
List of shipwrecks: 1 July 1857
Ship	State	Description
Earl of Derby	United Kingdom	The ship was driven ashore at "Trefontano", Sicily. She was on a voyage from Smyrna, Ottoman Empire to an English port. She was refloated on 6 July and taken in to "Mazzora".
Futtah Moombarrack	India	The full-rigged ship was wrecked on "Sirdy Island", in the Persian Gulf. All on board were rescued.
Jantina	Netherlands	The ship foundered in the North Sea off Scarborough, Yorkshire, United Kingdom. Her crew were rescued by the steamship Stockton (United Kingdom). Jantina was on a voyage from Groningen to Newcastle upon Tyne, Northumberland, United Kingdom.
Patriot	United Kingdom	The brig ran aground and sank at Thisted, Denmark. Her crew were rescued. She was on a voyage from Hull, Yorkshire to Stockholm, Sweden.

== 2 July ==
List of shipwrecks: 2 July 1857
Ship	State	Description
Arctic	United Kingdom	The ship was driven ashore on Sanday, Orkney. She had been refloated by 7 July and resumed her voyage.
Hebe	Sweden	The barque ran aground on the Goodwin Sands, Kent United Kingdom. She was on a voyage from Torrevecchia Teatina, Papal States to Stockholm. She was refloated and taken in to London, United Kingdom.
Napoleon	France	The steamship ran aground at Kronstadt, Russia. She was refloated and taken in to Kronstadt.
Norman	United Kingdom	The ship was driven ashore at Galle, Ceylon. Her crew were rescued.
Patriotess	United Kingdom	The ship ran aground on the Swan Spit. She was on a voyage from Leith, Lothian to Geelong, Victoria. She was refloated the next day and taken in to Queenscliff, Victoria.
Swea	Sweden	The steamship was driven ashore on Öland. She was on a voyage from Saint Petersburg, Russia to Gothenburg.

== 3 July ==
List of shipwrecks: 3 July 1857
Ship	State	Description
Delta	United Kingdom	The brig ran aground on the Sizewell Bank, in the North Sea off the coast of Suffolk. She was on a voyage from Hartlepool, County Durham to London. She was refloated and taken in to Harwich, Essex in a waterlogged condition.
Floraville	United Kingdom	The brig ran aground on the Whiting Sand, in the North Sea off the coast of Suddolk. She was refloated.
George the Fourth	United Kingdom	The brig ran aground on the Whitby Rock. She was on a voyage from Newcastle upon Tyne, Northumberland to Dieppe, Seine-Inférieure, France. She was refloated and resumed her voyage.
Gosport	United Kingdom	The ship was driven ashore 15 nautical miles (28 km) south of Cape Henry. Virginia, United States. She was on a voyage from Liverpool, Lancashire to Baltimore, Maryland, United States.
Patriot	United Kingdom	The ship sank off Lemvig, Denmark. Her crew were rescued. She was on a voyage from Hull, Yorkshire to Stockholm, Sweden.

== 4 July ==
List of shipwrecks: 4 July 1857
Ship	State	Description
Anne Augusta	United Kingdom	The ship ran aground at Carlingford, County Louth. She was refloated.
Julia	United Kingdom	The transport ship was driven ashore at Clifton, India with the loss of four lives. She was on a voyage from Kurrachee to Bombay.
Ontario	United Kingdom	The barque was driven ashore and wrecked at Plymouth, Devon. She was on a voyage from Sunderland, County Durham to Aden.
Richard	United Kingdom	The Mersey Flat was driven ashore at Dublin. She was on a voyage from Dublin to Liverpool, Lancashire.

== 5 July ==
List of shipwrecks: 5 July 1857
Ship	State	Description
Caroline	France	The brig was wrecked in the Magdalen Islands, Nova Scotia, British North America. Her crew were rescued. She was on a voyage from Bordeaux, Gironde to Quebec City, Province of Canada, British North America.
Esther	Netherlands	The schooner was capsized by a tornado off the Spanish Main with the loss of two lives.
H. Lidunia	Netherlands	The ship ran aground at Akyab, Burma and was damaged. She was refloated and put back to Akyab.
Rapid	United Kingdom	The ship ran aground at Great Yarmouth, Norfolk. She was refloated and resumed her voyage.

== 6 July ==
List of shipwrecks: 6 July 1857
Ship	State	Description
Agnes	United Kingdom	The barque was wrecked on the False Cape Patch, off the coast of Africa. She was on a voyage from the British Cameroons to Bonny.
Sally Gale	United Kingdom	The ship ran aground and sank at Quillebeuf-sur-Seine, Eure, France. Her crew were rescued. She was on a voyage from South Shields, County Durham to Rouen, Seine-Inférieure, France.

== 7 July ==
List of shipwrecks: 7 July 1857
Ship	State	Description
HMS Actaeon	Royal Navy	The sixth rate frigate ran aground on a reef in the Gaspar Strait (1°39′48″S 106°37′58″E) and was damaged.
Hampden	United Kingdom	The ship foundered in the South Atlantic. Her eleven crew too to tow boats; eight of them reached Bahia, Brazilon 17 July. The other three were reported missing. Hampden was on a voyage from Newport, Monmouthshire to Ascension Island.
Sampson	United Kingdom	The Mersey Flat sank in the River Mersey with the loss of all five people on board.
Three Brothers	United Kingdom	The ship was driven ashore. She was on a voyage from London to Lübeck. She was refloated and taken in to Carolinensiel, Kingdom of Hanover for repairs.

== 8 July ==
List of shipwrecks: 8 July 1857
Ship	State	Description
Cawthorn	United Kingdom	The ship ran aground and capsized at Bideford, Devon. She was on a voyage from Demerara, British Guiana to Bidefored.
Endeavour	(United Kingdom of Great Britain and Ireland) Jamaica	The schooner was attacked on the coast of the Spanish Main 150 nautical miles (280 km) from Bahia Honda, Republic of New Granada. Local inhabitants plundered the vessel, murdered four of her eleven crew and set her afire.
Koning Willem II	Netherlands	The ship was wrecked in Guichen Bay.

== 10 July ==
List of shipwrecks: 10 July 1857
Ship	State	Description
Gil Blas	(United Kingdom of Great Britain and Ireland) New Zealand	The schooner was wrecked on the southern end of Mana Island, New Zealand, whilst en route from Wellington to Sydney. There were no deaths.
HMS Transit	Royal Navy	The troopship was wrecked on a reef in the Bangka Strait (1°59′40″S 105°08′40″E). All on board survived.
William Bailey	United Kingdom	The ship was run ashore in Plettenberg Bay where she was destroyed by fire. Her crew survived. She was on a voyage from Algoa Bay to London.

== 11 July ==
List of shipwrecks: 11 July 1857
Ship	State	Description
St. Louis	France	The ship ran aground on the Holm Sand, in the North Sea off the coast of Suffolk, United Kingdom. She was on a voyage from Sunderland, County Durham, United Kingdom to Vannes, Morbihan. She was refloated and put in to Lowestoft, Suffolk.
Undaunted	United Kingdom	The whaler was crushed by ice in Melville Bay. Her crew were rescued.

== 13 July ==
List of shipwrecks: 13 July 1857
Ship	State	Description
Beta	United Kingdom	The barque ran aground on the Blackwater Bank, in the Irish Sea off the coast of County Wicklow. She was on a voyage from Glasgow, Renfrewshire to Boston, Massachusetts, United States. She was refloated the next day and resumed her voyage.
Grazio à Deo	Uruguay	The barque collided with the full-rigged ship Carlyle (United States) and sank in St. George's Channel with the loss of six of her twelve crew. Grazio à Deo was on a voyage from Liverpool, Lancashire, United Kingdom to Trieste.

== 14 July ==
List of shipwrecks: 14 July 1857
Ship	State	Description
Belle	United Kingdom	The ship was driven ashore and wrecked on "Rotkein", Grand Duchy of Finland. She was on a voyage from Kronstadt, Russia to Whitby, Yorkshire.
Energy	United Kingdom	The brig capsized and sank at the mouth of the Restigouche River.
Francis	(United Kingdom of Great Britain and Ireland) Straits Settlements	The barque was driven ashore in the Chusan Islands, China. She was on a voyage from Woosung to Amoy, China. She became a wreck on 18 July with the loss of 21 crew.

== 15 July ==
List of shipwrecks: 15 July 1857
Ship	State	Description
Antarctic	United Kingdom	The ship was wrecked on the South Sands, in the Strait of Malacca. She was on a voyage from Calcutta, India to Hong Kong.

== 17 July ==
List of shipwrecks: 17 July 1857
Ship	State	Description
Britannia	United States	The ship was driven ashore in the Saguenay River. She was on a voyage from Bic, Province of Canada, British North America to an English port. She was refloated the next day and subsequently taken in to Quebec City, Province of Canada.
Isabella	United Kingdom	The ship was driven ashore and wrecked on the south coast of Öland, Sweden.
Manhattan	United States	The ship was driven ashore at Formby, Lancashire, United Kingdom. She was on a voyage from New York to Liverpool, Lancashire. She was refloated and taken in to Liverpool.

== 18 July ==
List of shipwrecks: 18 July 1857
Ship	State	Description
Agnes	United Kingdom	The ship was wrecked on the Bimbay Flats, on the African coast.
Lapwing	United Kingdom	The ship ran aground on the Cockle Sand, in the North Sea off the coast of Norfolk.
Louis Charles	France	The lugger foundered off Bideford, Devon, United Kingdom. Her crew were rescued. She was on a voyage from Cardiff, Glamorgan, United Kingdom to Bordeaux, Gironde.
Van Bosse	Netherlands	The ship was wrecked on "Tarama", in the "Line Kive Islands", Japan. All 27 people on board were rescued. She was on a voyage from Shanghai, China to Singapore, Straits Settlements.

== 19 July ==
List of shipwrecks: 19 July 1857
Ship	State	Description
Creole	(United Kingdom of Great Britain and Ireland) Antigua	The ship was wrecked at Antigua.
Semiramis	United Kingdom	The ship foundered in the Indian Ocean 150 nautical miles (280 km) off Colombo, Ceylon. All on board survived. She was on a voyage from Colombo to London.

== 20 July ==
List of shipwrecks: 20 July 1857
Ship	State	Description
Magnet	United Kingdom	The ship ran aground on the Newcombe Sand, in the North Sea off the coast of Suffolk. She was on a voyage from Kronstadt, Russia to London. she was refloated.
Wohlfart	Prussia	The ship was driven ashore and wrecked at Memel. Her crew were rescued.

== 21 July ==
List of shipwrecks: 21 July 1857
Ship	State	Description
Kandian Chief	United Kingdom	The ship was destroyed by fire off the Cape of Good Hope, Cape Colony. Her crew were rescued. She was on a voyage from The Downs to Ceylon.
Monasco	United States	The barque was wrecked near "Burie", Newfoundland, British North America with the loss of 54 lives. She was on a voyage from Gothenburg, Sweden to New York.
Moultree	United Kingdom	The full-rigged ship ran aground off Charleston, South Carolina, United States. She was on a voyage from Cardiff, Glamorgan to Charleston. She had sunk by 25 July.
Paragon	United Kingdom	The ship struck a reef in the Pentland Firth and was damaged. She was on a voyage from South Shields, County Durham to Quebec City, Province of Canada, British North America. She put in to Widewall Bay in a leaky condition.

== 22 July ==
List of shipwrecks: 22 July 1857
Ship	State	Description
Falkland	United Kingdom	The ship ran aground on the Green Island Reef, in British North American waters. She was on a voyage from Quebec City, Province of Canada, British North America to Liverpool, Lancashire. She was refloated on 24 August and towed in to Quebec City in a capsized condition.
Ste. Anne	(United Kingdom of Great Britain and Ireland) British North America	The schooner was wrecked on the Goose Island Reef.

== 23 July ==
List of shipwrecks: 23 July 1857
Ship	State	Description
Arabian	(United Kingdom of Great Britain and Ireland) British North America	The steamship was driven ashore and scuttled at Quebec City, Province of Canada. She was on a voyage from Rivière-du-Loup to Quebec City.
Consul Davis	Norway	The brig ran aground on Norra Flytarre, off Gotland, Sweden and was wrecked. She was on a voyage from Kronstadt, Russia to an English port. She was refloated on 28 August and taken in to Slitohamn, Sweden.
Currency	United Kingdom	The ship was driven ashore at Kamouraska, Province of Canada, British North America. She was on a voyage from Quebec City to Whitehaven, Cumberland. She had been refloated by 10 August and towed in to Quebec City.

== 24 July ==
List of shipwrecks: 24 July 1857
Ship	State	Description
Juno	(Russian Empire) Grand Duchy of Finland	The schooner was wrecked on the Barshage Reef, off the south coast of Gotland, Sweden. She was on a voyage from London, United Kingdom to Turku. She had been refloated by 28 August and taken in to "Burysock".
Sarah Clarke	United States	The barque was driven ashore at Yarmouth, Nova Scotia, British North America. She was on a voyage from Saint John, New Brunswick, British North America to a European port. She was refloated and taken in to Portland, Maine.
Senoriano	Spain	The brig was destroyed by fire at Havana, Cuba.
Witch of the Wave	United Kingdom	The ship ran aground on the English Bank, in the River Plate and sank. Her crew were rescued. She was on a voyage from Liverpool, Lancashire to Montevideo, Uruguay.

== 25 July ==
List of shipwrecks: 25 July 1857
Ship	State	Description
Ann	United Kingdom	The ship was driven ashore on Skagen, Denmark. She was on a voyage from "Wyburg" to Gloucester. She was refloated on 27 July and taken in to Gothenburg, Sweden.
Ohio	United Kingdom	The ship was driven ashore near Alexandretta, Ottoman Empire. She was on a voyage from South Shields, County Durham to Alexandretta. She was later refloated.
Tosna (Тосна)	Imperial Russian Navy	The steamship ran aground and was wrecked on a reef southeast of Bolshoy Tyuters in the Gulf of Finland. Her crew were rescued. She was on a voyage from Kronstadt to Narva.

== 26 July ==
List of shipwrecks: 26 July 1857
Ship	State	Description
Gipsey	United Kingdom	The full-rigged ship was lost near St. Shott's, Newfoundland, British North America. Her crew were rescued. she was on a voyage from Quebec City, Province of Canada, British North America to Liverpool, Lancashire.

== 27 July ==
List of shipwrecks: 27 July 1857
Ship	State	Description
London Packet	United Kingdom	The ship was abandoned in the North Sea. Her crew were rescued by Aurora (Denmark). London Packet was on a voyage from Stettin to Ipswich, Suffolk.
Marie Francoise	France	The schooner was in collision with Stranger (United Kingdom) and was abandoned in the English Channel 30 nautical miles (56 km) south of Start Point, Devon, United Kingdom. Her crew were rescued by Stranger. Marie Francoise was on a voyage from Havre de Grâce, Seine-Inférieure to Cardiff, Glamorgan, United Kingdom. She was towed in to Alderney, Channel Islands in a derelict condition on 6 August.

== 28 July ==
List of shipwrecks: 28 July 1857
Ship	State	Description
Helen	(United Kingdom of Great Britain and Ireland) New Zealand	The brigantine was blown onto rocks at Pitt Island in New Zealand's Chatham Islands by a fierce gale, with the loss of eight of the 14 people on board.

== 29 July ==
List of shipwrecks: 29 July 1857
Ship	State	Description
Creole	United Kingdom	The brig was wrecked on the Belfast Reef, off the north coast of Antigua. She was on a voyage from London to Antigua.

== 30 July ==
List of shipwrecks: 30 July 1857
Ship	State	Description
Ariel	(United Kingdom of Great Britain and Ireland) New South Wales	The schooner was wrecked on Swan Island, Tasmania.
Carack	United Kingdom	The ship caught fire in the Gulf of Mexico and was abandoned. She was on a voyage from New Orleans, Louisiana, United States to Liverpool, Lancashire.
Harp	(United Kingdom of Great Britain and Ireland) New South Wales	The schooner was wrecked on Swan Island.
Hylton Grove	United Kingdom	The ship was beached on Landfall Island, Andaman Islands. Her crew were rescued by Arratoon Apcar (Flag unknown).
Norna	(United Kingdom of Great Britain and Ireland) New South Wales	The schooner was wrecked on Swan Island.
Rapid	(United Kingdom of Great Britain and Ireland) New South Wales	The schooner was wrecked on Swan Island.
Valentine	United Kingdom	The schooner ran aground, capsized and sank at Newport, Monmouthshire. She was on a voyage from Newport to Youghal, County Cork.

== Unknown date ==
List of shipwrecks: Unknown date in July 1857
Ship	State	Description
Boyne	United Kingdom	The brig ran aground on the Sunderland Bank, in the Irish Sea. She was on a voyage from Ardrossan, Ayrshire to Fleetwood, Lancashire.
Bromborough	United Kingdom	The ship was wrecked at Richibucto, New Brunswick, British North America before 2 June.
Constantia	United Kingdom	The ship was wrecked at Kedgeree, India before 3 July.
Don	United Kingdom	The ship ran aground at St. Ives, Cornwall. She was on a voyage from Quebec City to Hayle, Cornwall.
HMS Himalaya	Royal Navy	The troopship ran aground in the Strait of Banca. She was refloated on 8 July with assistance from Gauntlet (United Kingdom).
Italia	Kingdom of the Two Sicilies	The brig was wrecked on Reeth's Reef. Her crew were rescued by Confidence (United Kingdom). Italia was on a voyage from Agrigento to Newcastle upon Tyne, Northumberland, United Kingdom.
Johannes	Kingdom of Hanover	The full-rigged ship was driven ashore near Adra, Spain before 23 July. She was on a voyage from Newcastle upon Tyne to Trieste.
Laurent et Fauny	France	The brig ran aground and capsized at Cardiff, Glamorgan, United Kingdom.
Leonhardt	Netherlands	The ship sank off Manado, Netherlands East Indies before 28 July.
Mary Matilda	United States	The ship ran aground near Brouwershaven, Zeeland, Netherlands. She was refloated and taken in to Hellevoetsluis, Zeeland.
Pacha	United Kingdom	The ship was driven ashore on Hogland, Russia. She was on a voyage from Sunderland, County Durham to Kronstadt, Russia. She was refloated and completed her voyage, arriving on 31 July.
Pacific	United States	The barque was driven ashore in the Dry Tortugas.
Polynesia	United Kingdom	The ship was driven ashore at Carlingford, County Louth before 25 July. She was refloated.
Prince Albert	United Kingdom	The brig was driven ashore at Patrick's Hole, British North America.
Prisilla	United States	The cargo schooner was lost on Norman's Woe.
Retriever	(United Kingdom of Great Britain and Ireland) New South Wales	The brig was lost at sea during July while en route from Sydney to The Bluff, New Zealand. Wreckage was later found along the South Island's west coast.
Rosabella	United Kingdom	The brig was wrecked on the Spanish Main. Her crew survived.
Swift	United Kingdom	The schooner was driven ashore at "Hantoon", County Wexford. She was refloated.
Vermont	United States	The barque was driven ashore and severely damaged on Cape Sable Island, Nova Scotia before 27 July. She was on a voyage from Quebec City to Hull, Yorkshire. She had been refloated by 8 August and taken in to Barrington, Rhode Island, where she was condemned.
