= Lamontichthys filamentosus =

Conservation status
- Least Concern (IUCN 3.1)

Scientific classification
- Kingdom: Animalia
- Phylum: Chordata
- Class: Actinopterygii
- Order: Siluriformes
- Family: Loricariidae
- Genus: Lamontichthys
- Species: L. filamentosus

Binomial name
- Lamontichthys filamentosus (LaMonte, 1935)

Synonyms
- Harttia filamentosa LaMonte, 1935; Harttia filamentissima C. H. Eigenmann & Allen, 1942

Species of fish

Lamontichthys filamentosus is a species of freshwater ray-finned fish belonging to the family Loricariidae, the suckermouth armored catfishes, and the subfamily Loricariinae, the mailed catfishes. This species is found in the upper and middle Amazon basin in Bolivia, Brazil, Colombia, Ecuador and Peru. This species reaches a maximum standard length of 16.7 cm (6.6 in).
