= El Calabozo cove =

Coordinates: 11°25′N 71°35′W

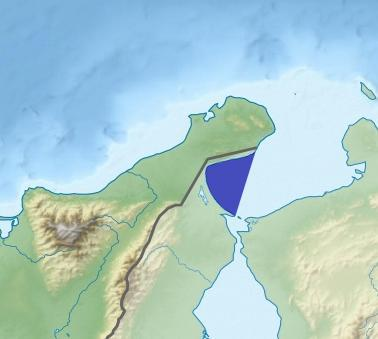

El Calabozo cove (Spanish: Ensenada de Calabozo) is a cove located at the northern tip of South America, at the western Gulf of Venezuela, the country's namesake. This cove starts in Castilletes Point and ends to 90.60 km at the southern Barrier of Maracaibo, comprising approximately 140 km of coastline, and shapes the coastline that originate the La Guajira Peninsula.

Administratively, it belongs to the Zulia State.
