= Government of Santa Marta =

Polity

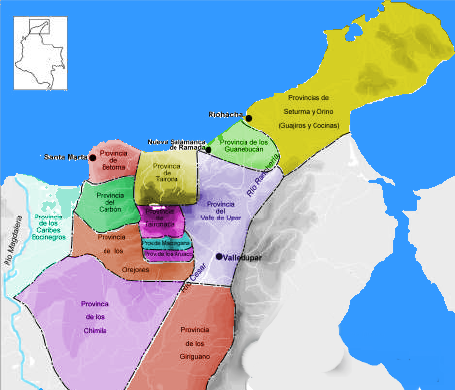
Indigenous territories in c. 1500.

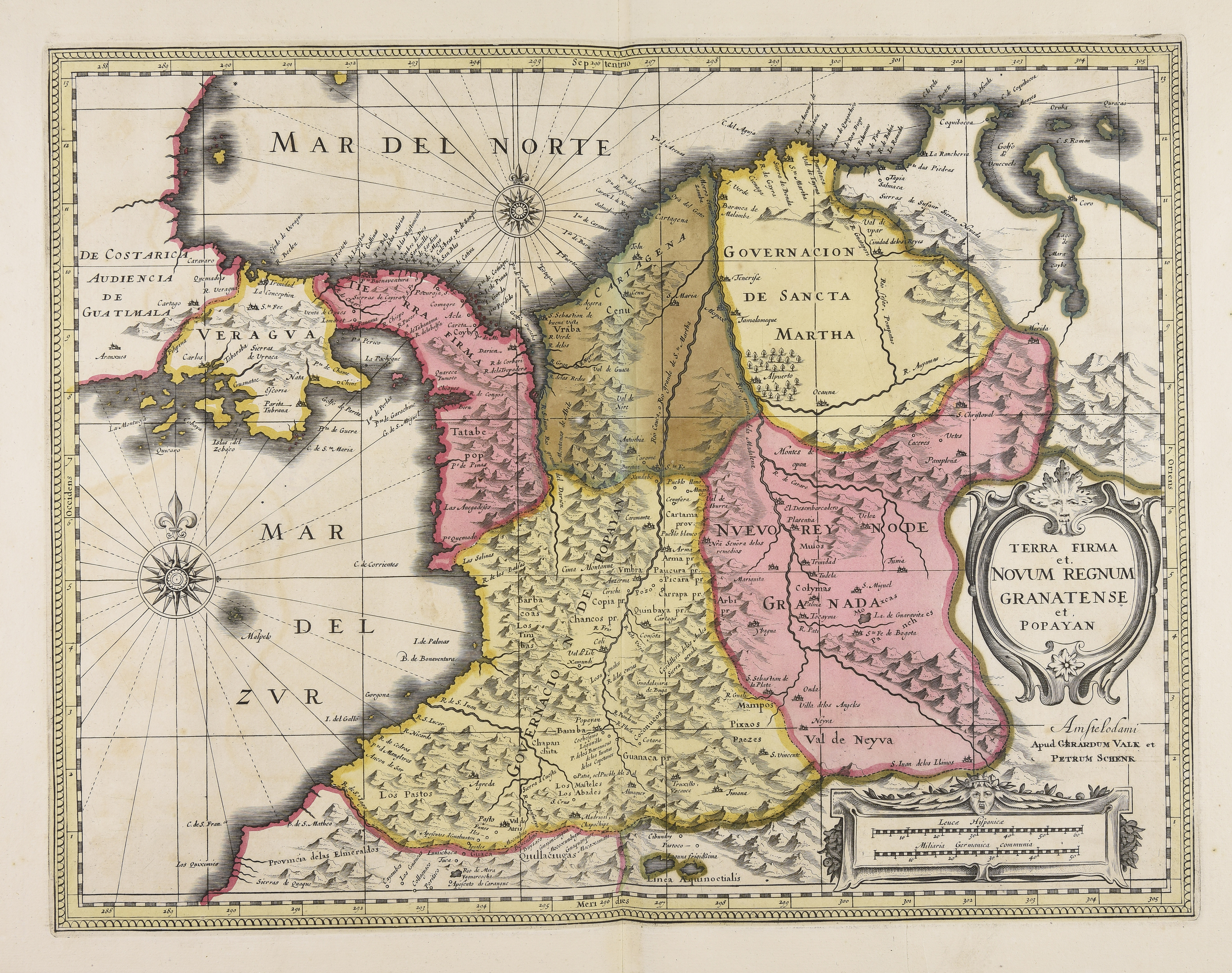
The New Kingdom of Granada. (1680)

The Government of Santa Marta was a capitulation given by the King of Spain between 1526 and 1618 to his loyals to manage newly discovered and conquered territories in the Americas. The Government of Santa Marta became part of the New Kingdom of Granada in 1528 as a subdivision. In 1549 the Government of Santa Marta was subject to the Royal Audience of Santa Fe de Bogotá.

== History ==
=== Discovery ===
The Spanish expedition led by Alonso de Ojeda, Amerigo Vespucci and Juan de la Cosa arrived to the coast of the Guajira Peninsula in 1499. In a second voyage bordered the coast southwest as further as to the gulf of Urabá. In 1501 Rodrigo de Bastidas repeated the trip along with Juan de la Cosa but upon their return to Spain, Bastidas was incarcerated along Christopher Columbus.

The village of Santa Marta was founded on 29 July 1525. A year before Rodrigo de Bastidas signed a capitulation with the King of Spain on 6 November 1524 establishing himself as the first governor of Santa Marta.
