= Guajira–Barranquilla xeric scrub =

Ecoregion in South America

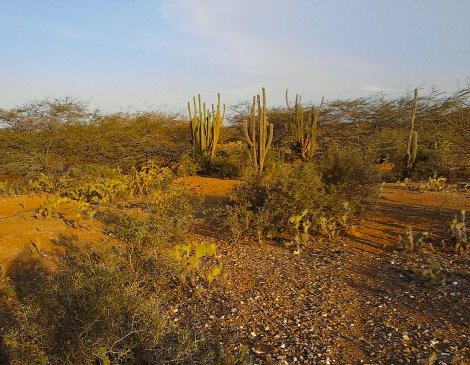

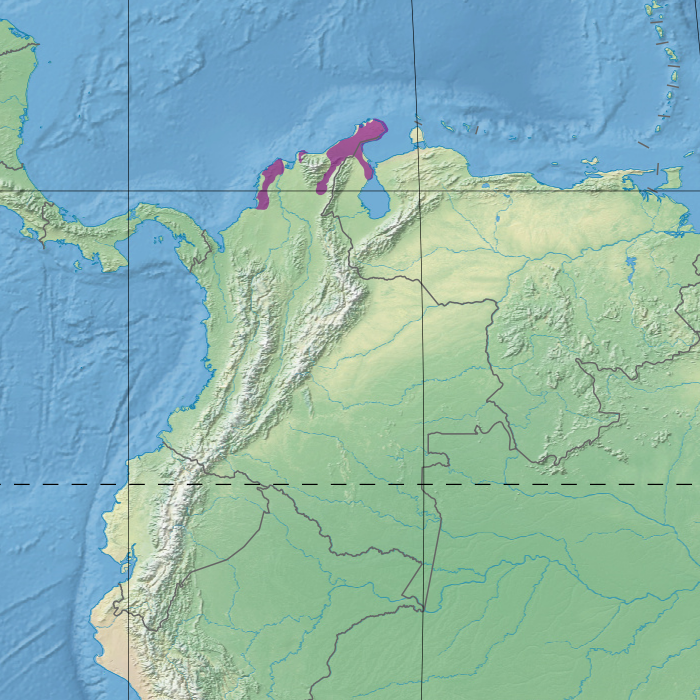
- Ecoregion territory (in purple)

Ecology
- Biome: Deserts and xeric shrublands

Geography
- Area: 150,000 km^{2} (58,000 mi^{2})
- Country: Colombia, Venezuela, ABC Islands (Leeward Antilles)
- Coordinates: 11°N 74°W
- Geology: Cesar-Ranchería, Cocinetas, Guajira, Maracaibo, Sinú-San Jacinto Basin

The Guajira–Barranquilla xeric scrub is a xeric shrubland ecoregion in Colombia, Venezuela, and the ABC Islands (Leeward Antilles), covering an estimated area of 150,000 km^{2} (58,000 sq mi). Rainfall varies from 125 to 600 mm (4.9 to 23.6 in), and the median temperature is 26 °C (79 °F).

== Location ==
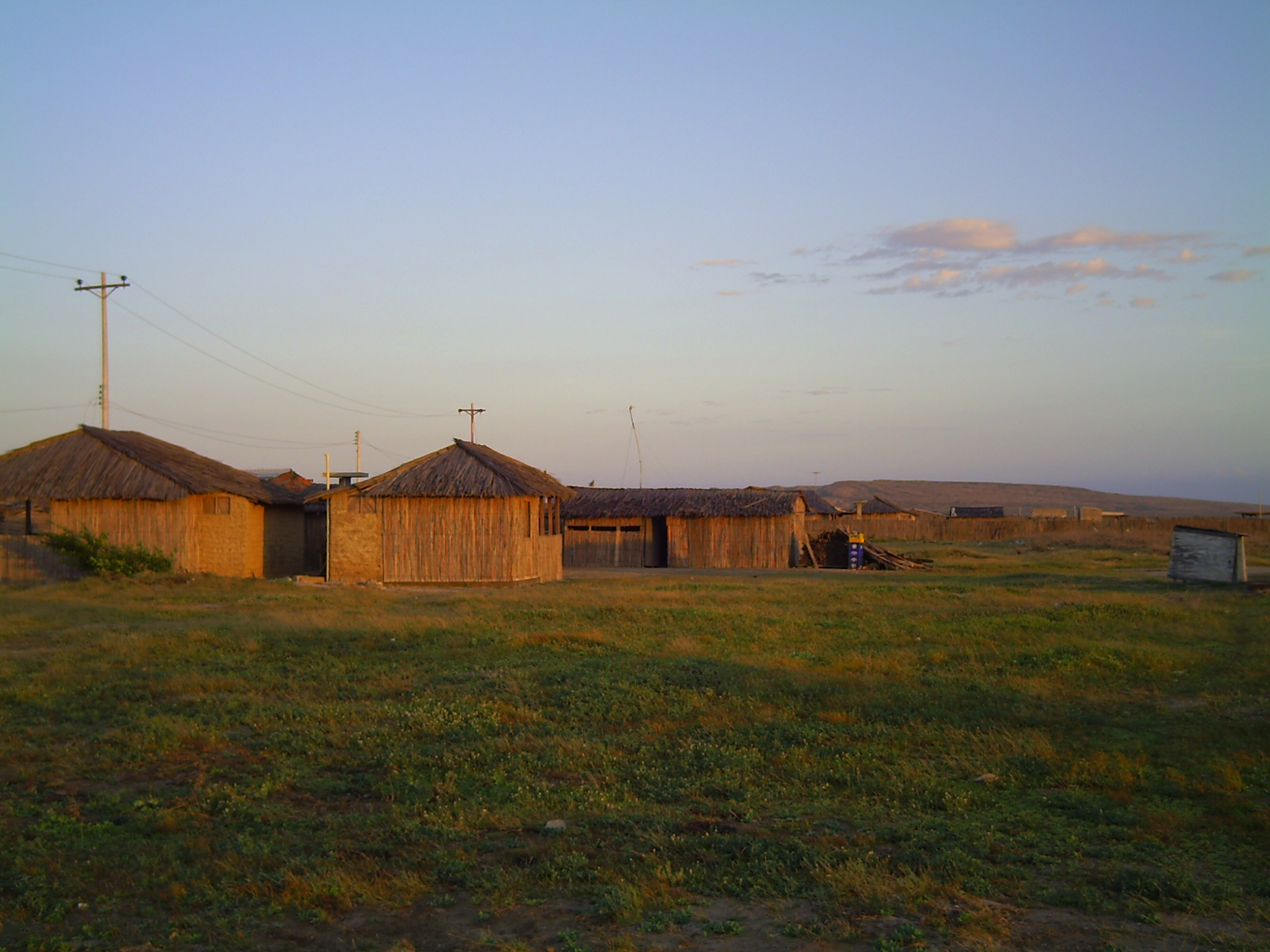
A wayuu rancheria. The wayuu people are the native inhabitants of the Guajira xeric scrub

The ecoregion occupies the Guajira Peninsula, the valley of the Rancheria river and Guajira Department, covering parts of the northeastern coast of Venezuela to the ABC Islands (Leeward Antilles). The valleys lie in the rain shadow of the surrounding Serranía de Macuira, which reaches an elevation of 900 m (3,000 ft) over sea level. These mountains trap some of the trade winds, causing mist. An important tourist destination in the area is Cabo de la Vela, and Klein Curaçao.

== Ecology ==
=== Flora ===
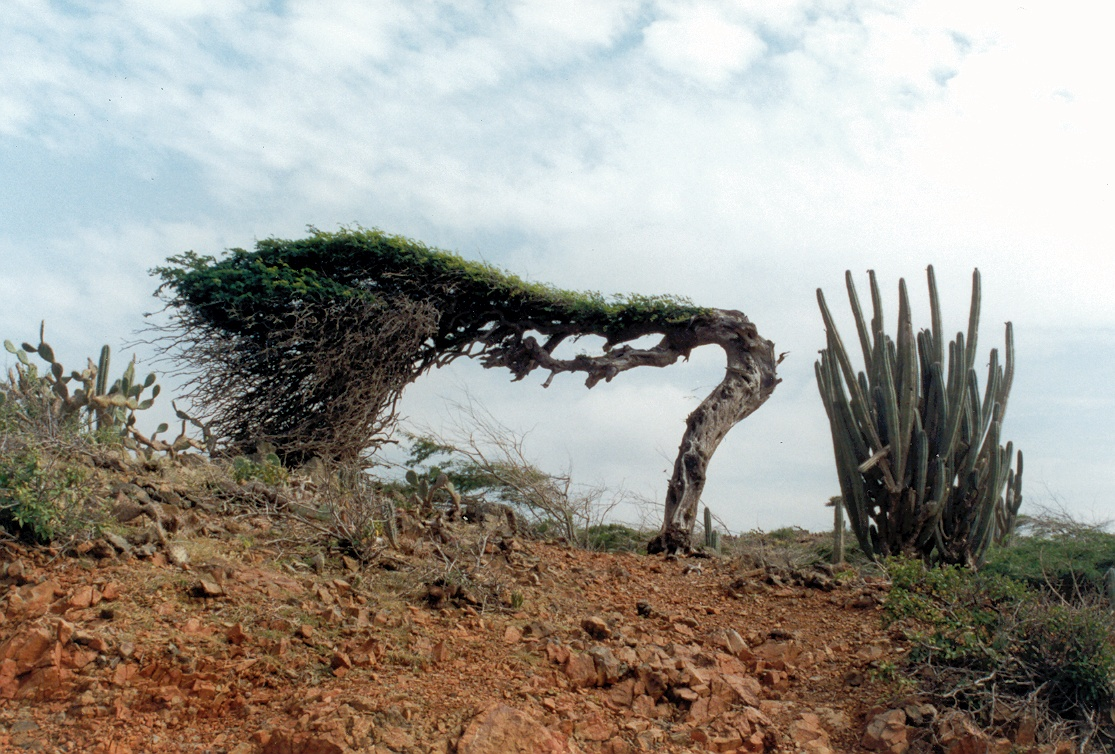
Divi-divi (Caesalpinia coriaria)

The ecoregion is dominated by thorny trees and succulents. Common species include Acacia glomerosa, Bourreria cumanensis, Bulnesia arborea, Caesalpinia coriaria, Copaifera venezolana, Croton sp., Gyrocarpus americanus, Hyptis sp., Jacquinia pungens, Malpighia glabra, Myrospermum frutescens, Opuntia caribaea, Pereskia guamacho, Piptadenia flava, Prosopis juliflora, and Stenocereus griseus.

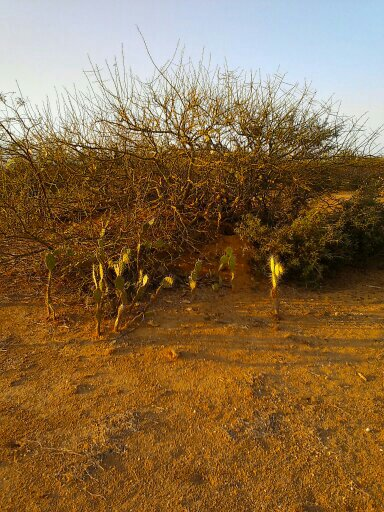

Forests dominated by Lonchocarpus punctatus are often accompanied by Bunchosia odorata and Ayenia magna. Other forests exist in which Prosopis juliflora, Erythrina velutina and Clerodendron ternifolium are dominant. A variety of plant communities occur where two plant species are dominant. Examples include Astronium graveolens – Handroanthus billbergii, Haematoxylum brasiletto – Melochia tomentosa, Caesalpinia coriaria – Cordia curassavica, Bursera glabra – Castela erecta, Vitex cymosa – Libidibia coraria, Mimosa cabrera – Cordia curassavica, Bursera tomentosa – Bursera graveolens and Castela erecta – Parkinsonia praecox.

=== Fauna ===
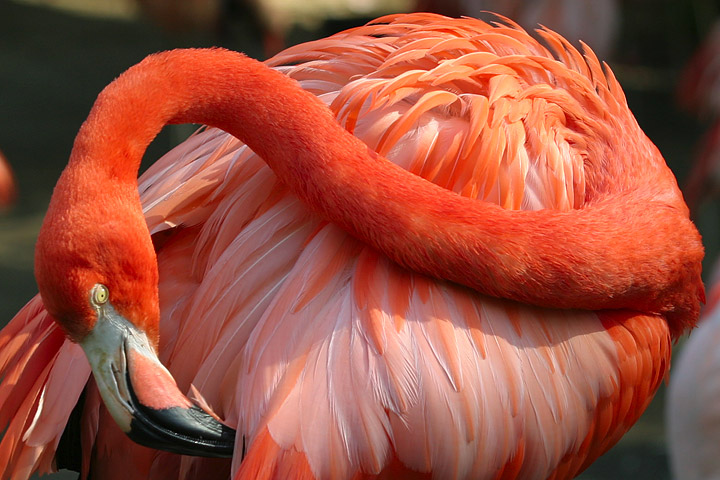
Caribbean flamingo (Phoenicopterus ruber)

The ecoregion is notable for being the habitat of a large community of Caribbean flamingo (Phoenicopterus ruber), besides a diversity of birds and bats.

== Conservation ==
Most of the Serranía de Macuira lies within National Natural Park of Macuira. Nearby is the 80 km^{2} (31 sq mi) Los Flamencos Sanctuary, which is a center of plant diversity for species of Hechtia, Salvia, and cactus. Of the 2700 species found within, approximately 30% are endemic.
