= Lamontichthys =

Scientific classification
- Kingdom: Animalia
- Phylum: Chordata
- Class: Actinopterygii
- Order: Siluriformes
- Family: Loricariidae
- Subfamily: Loricariinae
- Genus: Lamontichthys; P. Miranda-Ribeiro, 1939

Type species
- Harttia filamentosa La Monte, 1935

Genus of fishes

Lamontichthys is a genus of freshwater ray-finned fishes belonging to the family Loricariidae, the suckermouth armored catfishes, and the subfamily Loricariinae, the mailed catfishes. The catfishes in this genus are found in South America

== Taxonomy ==
The phylogenetic position of Lamontichthys remains uncertain. It has been considered to be sister to Harttia, whereas Lamontichthys shows much more similarities with Pterosturisoma microps of the monotypic genus Pterosturisoma, which only differs from Lamontichthys by the number of pectoral fin rays. The genus Lamontichthys is classified in the subfamily Loricariinae in the family Loricariidae which is classified in the suborder Loricarioidei of the catfish order, Siluriformes.

== Etymology ==
Lamontichthys suffixes the Greek word ichthys, meaning "fish", onto the surname of teh American ichthyologist Francesca LaMonte, the describer of the type species as Harttia filamantosa in 1935.

== Species ==
Lamontichthys contains the following recognized valid species:

- Lamontichthys avacanoeiro Paixão & Toledo-Piza, 2009
- Lamontichthys filamentosus (LaMonte, 1935)
- Lamontichthys llanero Taphorn & Lilyestrom, 1984
- Lamontichthys maracaibero Taphorn & Lilyestrom, 1984
- Lamontichthys parakana Paixão & Toledo-Piza, 2009
- Lamontichthys stibaros Isbrücker & Nijssen, 1978

== Distribution and habitat ==
Lamontichthys is distributed in the northwestern part of South America in the upper Amazon and Orinoco River drainages, and in the Lake Maracaibo region. Species in this genus occupy the same ecological niche as those of Harttia. They mainly live in the mainstream of rivers, on rocky and sandy bottoms.

== Description ==
Sexual dimorphism in Lamontichthys includes hypertrophied odontodes on the pectoral spines in mature males. In all species of Lamontichthys, there is one pectoral fin spine and seven pectoral fin rays on each fin, as opposed to the rest of Loricariinae species which have one pectoral fin spine and only six pectoral fin rays.

== Ecology ==
Lamontichthys is an open brooder; eggs are laid on an open surface such as rocks, submerged wood or plants, and are generally exposed to the current. Females lay a few large-sized (1.4–1.8 millimetres or .056–.071 in in diameter) yellowish eggs during each spawning event.
