= Cabo de la Vela =

Cape in northern Colombia

Coordinates: 12°12′27″N 72°10′22″W

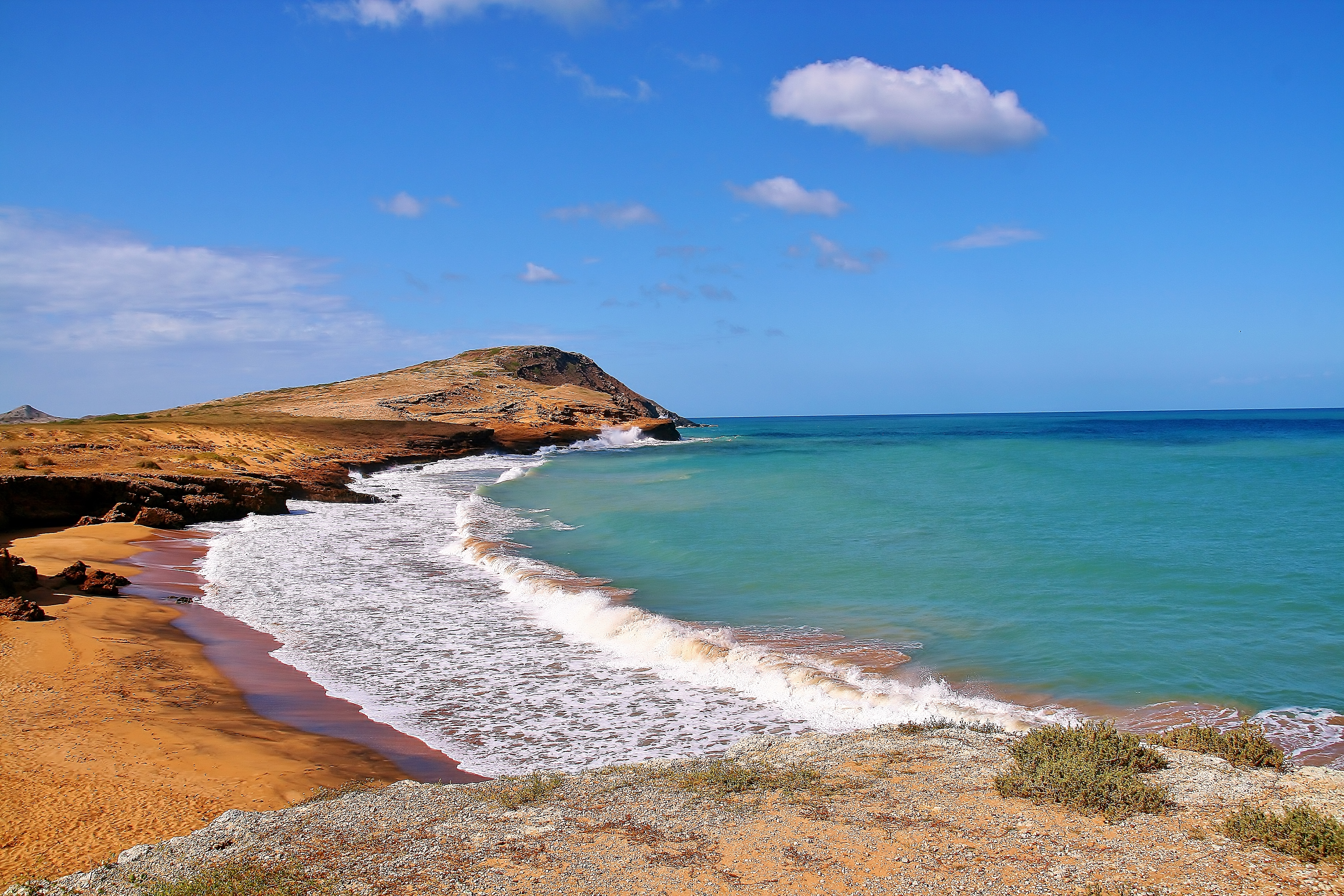
Cabo de la Vela.

Cabo de la Vela (Spanish for "cape of the sail") is a headland in the Guajira Peninsula in Colombia with an adjacent small fishing village. It is a popular ecotourism destination of the Caribbean region of Colombia.

== History ==
Spanish explorer Juan de la Cosa was among the first Europeans to see the cape in 1499, during his fourth travel as pilot for the expedition of Alonso de Ojeda, making this place, together with the Gulf of Paria, the first places ever visited by the Europeans on South American mainland. Its name derives from the first view of the cape from the sea, when the pale colors of the promontories and their curvilinear forms emerging from the flat desert, suggested vaguely to the Spanish the shape of a sailboat. The foundation of the first settlements in the area was made by Nikolaus Federmann who founded a village near the Cabo de la Vela with the name Nuestra Señora Santa María de los Remedios del Cabo de la Vela in 1535, the first settlement in La Guajira. Pearl deposits led to constant attacks from the indigenous Wayuu and other Spanish conquerors from the neighboring Government of Santa Marta and New Andalusia Province, and the village was moved to present-day Riohacha in 1544 and refounded by Nikolaus Federmann. The aboriginal inhabitants of the area were an ethnic group of Arawaks, who remained free, defeating the Spanish Conquest. Their descendants, the Wayuu people, still inhabit the area. Cabo de La Vela (Jepirra in Wayuunaiki) is a sacred place to them, since they believe it is the place where the souls of all the deceased travel to rest with the ancestors, as the gate to afterlife.

== Description ==
The cape is surrounded by the La Guajira Desert, part of the larger Guajira-Barranquilla xeric scrub. In the area there are several saline lagoons and mudflats visited by large populations of American flamingos.

== Climate ==
Cabo de la Vela has a hot arid climate (Köppen BWh) with little to no rainfall in all months except October and November.

Climate data for Cabo de la Vela
| Month | Jan | Feb | Mar | Apr | May | Jun | Jul | Aug | Sep | Oct | Nov | Dec | Year |
|---|---|---|---|---|---|---|---|---|---|---|---|---|---|
| Mean daily maximum °C (°F) | 31.7 (89.1) | 32.0 (89.6) | 32.4 (90.3) | 33.0 (91.4) | 33.8 (92.8) | 34.3 (93.7) | 34.9 (94.8) | 34.5 (94.1) | 34.2 (93.6) | 33.2 (91.8) | 32.5 (90.5) | 32.2 (90.0) | 33.2 (91.8) |
| Daily mean °C (°F) | 27.5 (81.5) | 27.7 (81.9) | 28.1 (82.6) | 28.7 (83.7) | 29.5 (85.1) | 30.0 (86.0) | 30.2 (86.4) | 30.0 (86.0) | 29.8 (85.6) | 29.0 (84.2) | 28.5 (83.3) | 28.0 (82.4) | 28.9 (84.1) |
| Mean daily minimum °C (°F) | 23.3 (73.9) | 23.5 (74.3) | 23.8 (74.8) | 24.4 (75.9) | 25.2 (77.4) | 25.7 (78.3) | 25.5 (77.9) | 25.6 (78.1) | 25.4 (77.7) | 24.9 (76.8) | 24.5 (76.1) | 23.8 (74.8) | 24.6 (76.3) |
| Average rainfall mm (inches) | 2 (0.1) | 1 (0.0) | 0 (0) | 25 (1.0) | 24 (0.9) | 11 (0.4) | 2 (0.1) | 15 (0.6) | 46 (1.8) | 101 (4.0) | 82 (3.2) | 19 (0.7) | 328 (12.8) |
Source: Climate-Data.org
