= Escalante River (Venezuela) =

- Mouth location in Venezuela
- Native name: Rio Escalante (Portuguese)

Location
- Country: Venezuela

Physical characteristics
- Mouth
  - coordinates: 9°14′45″N 71°47′07″W

The Escalante River (Spanish: Rio Escalante) is a river of Venezuela. It drains into Lake Maracaibo.

The river rises in the Venezuelan Andes. It then flows through the Maracaibo dry forests ecoregion before emptying into Lake Maracaibo.

== See also ==
- List of rivers of Venezuela
