= Lamontichthys maracaibero =

Conservation status
- Vulnerable (IUCN 3.1)

Scientific classification
- Kingdom: Animalia
- Phylum: Chordata
- Class: Actinopterygii
- Order: Siluriformes
- Family: Loricariidae
- Genus: Lamontichthys
- Species: L. maracaibero

Binomial name
- Lamontichthys maracaibero Taphorn & Lilyestrom, 1984

Species of fish

Lamontichthys maracaibero is a species of freshwater ray-finned fish belonging to the family Loricariidae, the suckermouth armored catfishes, and the subfamily Loricariinae, the mailed catfishes. This catfish is known obly from the south and southeast of the drainage basin of Lake Maracaibo in Colombia and Venezuela. This species grows to a standard length of 18.5 cm (7.3 in).
