= Allobates wayuu =

Conservation status
- Least Concern (IUCN 3.1)

Scientific classification
- Kingdom: Animalia
- Phylum: Chordata
- Class: Amphibia
- Order: Anura
- Family: Aromobatidae
- Genus: Allobates
- Species: A. wayuu

Binomial name
- Allobates wayuu (Acosta-Galvis, Cuentas, and Coloma, 1999)

Synonyms
- Colostethus wayuu Acosta-Galvis, Cuentas, and Coloma, 1999

Species of frog

Allobates wayuu is a species of frog in the family Aromobatidae. It is endemic to the Serranía de Macuira in La Guajira Department, Colombia, and is only known from its type locality in the Macuira National Natural Park.

== Etymology ==
The specific name wayuu refers to Wayuu people, an ethnic group from the extreme north of Colombia.

== Description ==
Males measure 14–17 mm (0.55–0.67 in) and females 16–20 mm (0.63–0.79 in) in snout–vent length. The snout is nearly ovoid in dorsal view and anteriorly inclined in lateral view. The tympanum is partly concealed. The canthus rostralis is acute but not prominent. The fingers and toes bear expanded discs; fingers are unwebbed whereas toes have some webbing. Skin is smooth. The body is brown while the limbs are cream; the hind limbs have brown bars. The sides are dark brown and have dorsolateral bands. The lips are cream. The belly is creamy with some brownish-gray spots. The toes of all four feet are brown in color.

== Reproduction ==
The eggs are deposited on the forest floor. The male carries the hatched tadpoles to streams and ponds where they complete their development. The tadpoles' bodies appear oval in shape when viewed from the side. They are creamy in color with black spots everywhere except the belly.

== Habitat and conservation ==
It inhabits tropical forest with dry vegetation, including secondary forest, at elevations of 210–780 m (690–2,560 ft) above sea level. The known population is within the Parque Nacional Natural Macuira.
