= Lamontichthys stibaros =

Conservation status
- Least Concern (IUCN 3.1)

Scientific classification
- Kingdom: Animalia
- Phylum: Chordata
- Class: Actinopterygii
- Order: Siluriformes
- Family: Loricariidae
- Genus: Lamontichthys
- Species: L. stibaros

Binomial name
- Lamontichthys stibaros Isbrücker & Nijssen, 1978

Species of fish

Lamontichthys stibaros is a species of freshwater ray-finned fish belonging to the family Loricariidae, the suckermouth armored catfishes, and the subfamily Loricariinae, the mailed catfishes. This catfish is found in Ecuador and Peru, in Ecuador it is found in the basin of the Napo-Pastaza basin, and in Peru it is known from the Marañon basin and has been reported from the Itaya River. This species grows to a standard length of 24.2 cm (9.5 in).
