= Gulf of Venezuela =

Gulf of the Caribbean Sea

Coordinates: 11°30′N 71°0′W

- Golfo de Venezuela (Spanish)
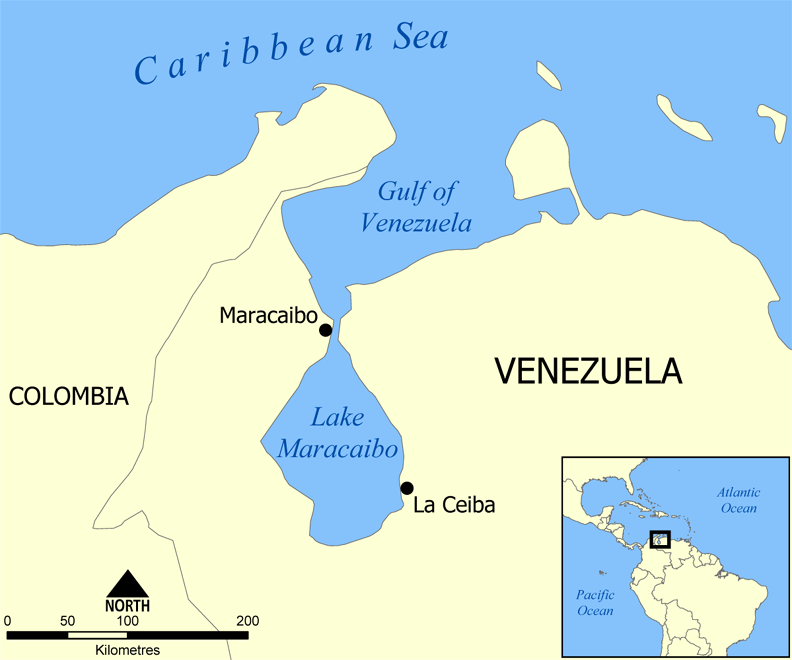
- Location of the Gulf of Venezuela

- Location within Venezuela
- Type: Gulf
- Primary outflows: Caribbean Sea
- Basin countries: Venezuela, Colombia
- Surface area: 17,840 km^{2} (6,890 mi^{2})

The Gulf of Venezuela is a gulf of the Caribbean Sea bounded by the Venezuelan states of Zulia and Falcón and by La Guajira Department, Colombia. The western side is formed by the Guajira Peninsula. A 54 km (34 mi) strait connects it with Maracaibo Lake to the south.

== Location ==
The Gulf is located in the north of South America, between Paraguaná Peninsula of the Falcón State to the east in Venezuela and the Guajira Peninsula in Colombia to the west. It is connected to the south to Maracaibo Lake through an artificial navigation canal. Colombia and Venezuela have had a longstanding dispute over control of the gulf that has not been resolved, despite the decades-long negotiations conducted by a bilateral commission.

== History ==
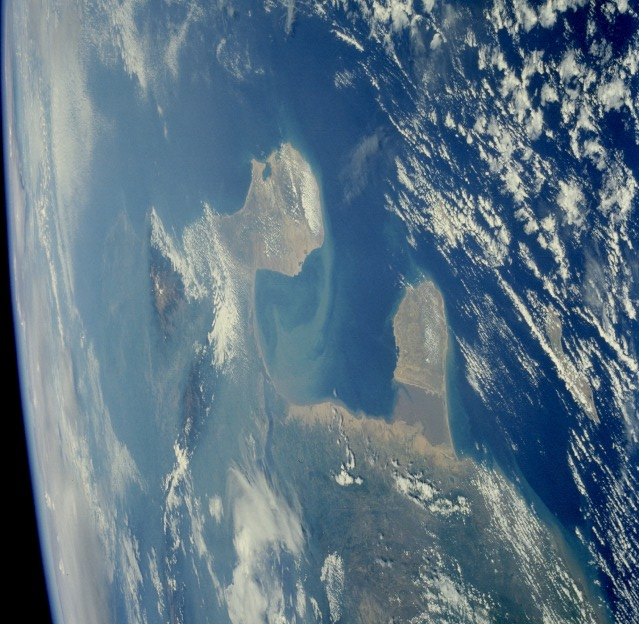
Satellite view of the gulf

The gulf was first seen by Europeans in 1499, when an expedition commanded by Alonso de Ojeda, in which he was accompanied by Amerigo Vespucci, explored the Venezuelan coasts. They compiled information and named the new lands; this expedition arrived at the gulf after passing through the Netherlands Antilles and the Peninsula of Paraguaná.

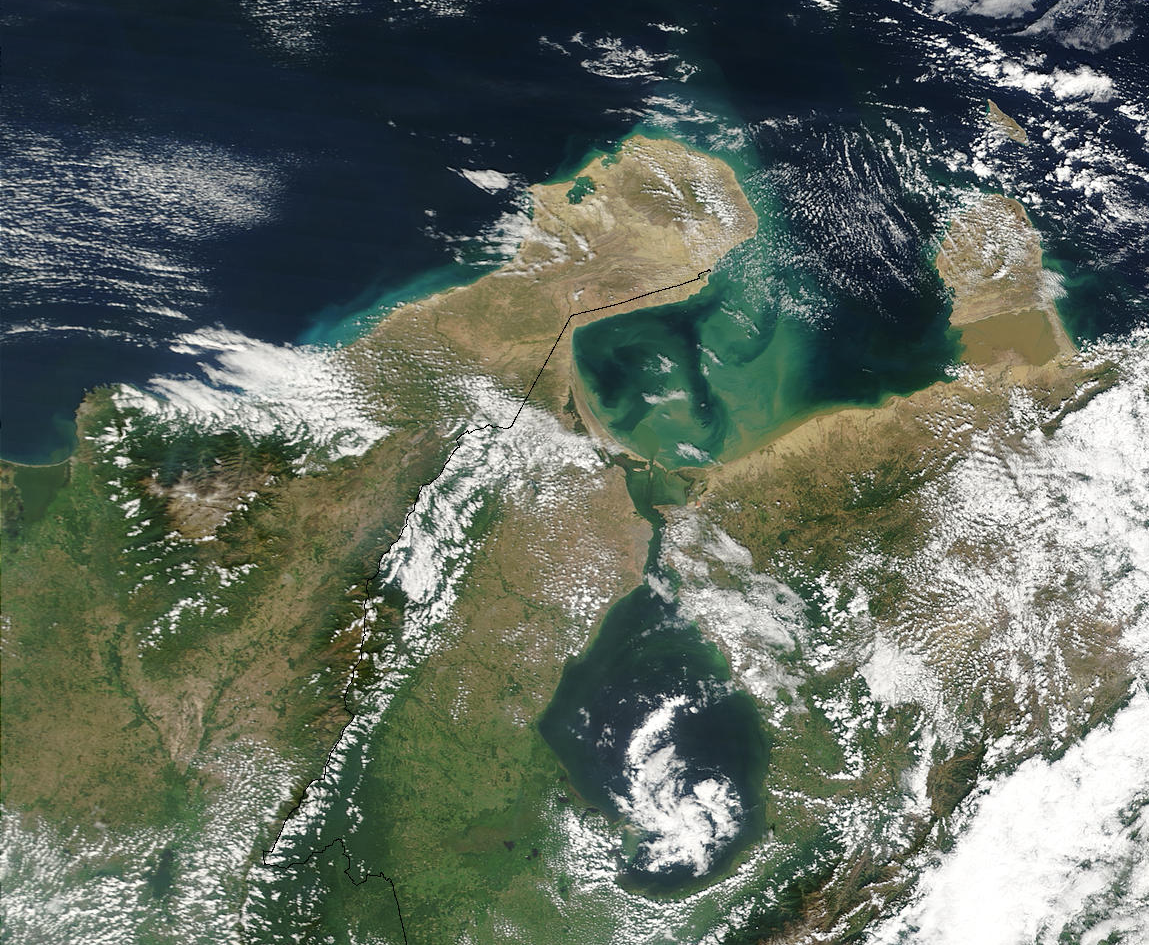
The Guajira Peninsula, the Gulf of Venezuela, and Lake Maracaibo, located south of the Caribbean Sea.

== Economic importance ==
These waters are important because they connect the Caribbean Sea to Lake Maracaibo in Venezuela, an important source of crude petroleum. Their industry uses the gulf to ship products from their wells and refineries in Lake Maracaibo to the world markets.

== See also ==
- El Calabozo cove
