= Lamontichthys parakana =

Conservation status
- Data Deficient (IUCN 3.1)

Scientific classification
- Kingdom: Animalia
- Phylum: Chordata
- Class: Actinopterygii
- Order: Siluriformes
- Family: Loricariidae
- Genus: Lamontichthys
- Species: L. parakana

Binomial name
- Lamontichthys parakana de Carvalho Paixão & Toledo-Piza, 2009

Species of catfish

Lamontichthys parakana is a species of freshwater ray-finned fish belonging to the family Loricariidae, the suckermouth armored catfishes, and the subfamily Loricariinae, the mailed catfishes. This catfish is endemic to Brazil where it occurs only in Pará in the Tocantins River, downstream from the Tucuruí Dam. This species grows to a standard length of 13.1 cm (5.2 in).
