= Lamontichthys llanero =

Conservation status
- Least Concern (IUCN 3.1)

Scientific classification
- Kingdom: Animalia
- Phylum: Chordata
- Class: Actinopterygii
- Order: Siluriformes
- Family: Loricariidae
- Genus: Lamontichthys
- Species: L. llanero

Binomial name
- Lamontichthys llanero Taphorn & Lilyestrom, 1984

Species of fish

Lamontichthys llanero, the royal whiptail or cowboy whiptail catfish, is a species of freshwater ray-finned fish belonging to the family Loricariidae, the suckermouth armored catfishes, and the subfamily Loricariinae, the mailed catfishes. This catfish is found in Colombia and Venezuela in tributaries of the Orinoco. This species grows to a standard length of 20.2 cm (8.0 in).
