= Bahía Honda, Los Santos =

Coordinates: 7.6833°N 80.4500°W

Bahía Honda
- Corregimiento
- Location within Panama
- Country: Panama
- Province: Los Santos
- District: Macaracas

Area
  - Land: 28.1 km^{2} (10.8 sq mi)

Population (2010)
  - Total: 646
  - Density: 23/km^{2} (60/sq mi)
- Population density calculated based on land area.
- Time zone: UTC−5 (EST)

Bahía Honda is a corregimiento in Macaracas District, Los Santos Province, Panama with a population of 646 as of 2010. Its population as of 1990 was 648; its population as of 2000 was 616.
