= Torrejoncillo del Rey =

Torrejoncillo del Rey, Spain
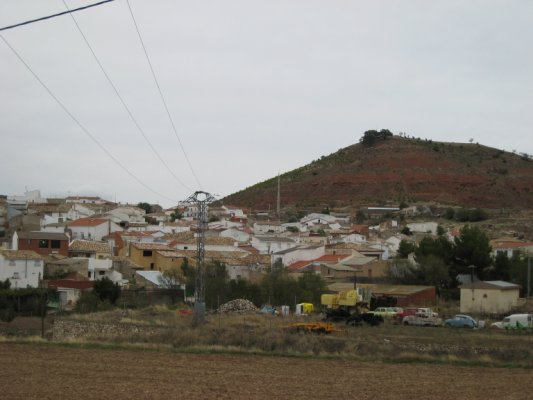
- Vista general del pueblo

- Flag Coat of arms

- Location within Spain Location within Castilla-La Mancha
- Coordinates: 40°00′N 2°34′W
- Country: Spain
- Autonomous community: Castile-La Mancha
- Province: Cuenca
- Municipality: Torrejoncillo del Rey

Area
  - Total: 201 km^{2} (78 sq mi)

Population (2025-01-01)
  - Total: 341
  - Density: 1.70/km^{2} (4.39/sq mi)
- Time zone: UTC+1 (CET)
  - Summer (DST): UTC+2 (CEST)

Torrejoncillo del Rey is a municipality located in the province of Cuenca, Castile-La Mancha, Spain. According to the 2004 census (INE), the municipality had a population of 652 inhabitants.
