= Lake Maracaibo =

Body of water in Venezuela

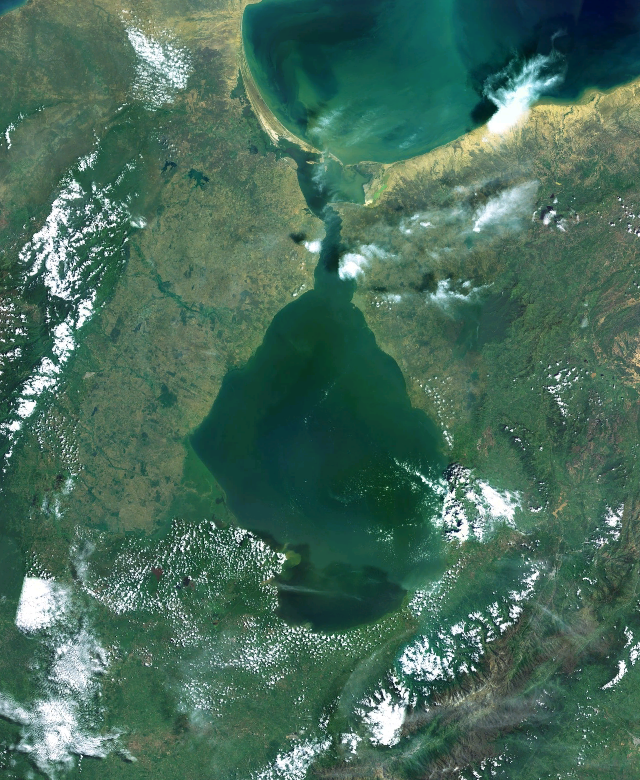
- Satellite image of Lake Maracaibo

- Location within Venezuela

- Map
- Coordinates: 09°48′57″N 71°33′24″W
- Type: Ancient lake, Coastal saltwater, bay, estuary
- Primary inflows: Catatumbo River
- Primary outflows: Gulf of Venezuela
- Basin countries: Venezuela
- Max. length: 210 kilometres (130 mi)
- Max. width: 121 kilometres (75 mi)
- Surface area: 13,512 km^{2} (5,217 sq mi)
- Max. depth: 35 m (115 ft)
- Water volume: 280 km^{3} (230,000,000 acre⋅ft)
- Surface elevation: 0 m (0 ft)
- Settlements: Maracaibo, Cabimas, Ciudad Ojeda

Lake Maracaibo (Spanish: Lago de Maracaibo) is located in northwestern Venezuela, between the states of Zulia, Trujillo, and Mérida. While Maracaibo is commonly referred to as a lake, its current hydrological characteristics may better classify it as an estuary and/or semi-enclosed bay connected to the Gulf of Venezuela. With a surface area of 13,512 km^{2} (5,217 sq mi), if counted as a lake it would be the largest in South America, ahead of Lake Titicaca, as well as one of the oldest lakes on Earth, having formed 36 million years ago in the Andes Mountains.

The lake consists of brackish water, and is connected to the Gulf of Venezuela to the north by a narrow strait. It is fed by numerous rivers, the biggest being the Catatumbo River. The fault in the northern section has collapsed and is rich in oil and gas resources. It is Venezuela's main oil producing area and an important fishing and agricultural producing area. Eutrophication caused by oil pollution is a major environmental problem facing the lagoon. The area around the lagoon is inhabited by a quarter of the country's population and is also the place with the most frequent lightning on Earth, the Catatumbo lightning, which can illuminate nighttime navigation.

== Geology ==
Lake Maracaibo is located within the eponymous basin and is one of the oldest lakes on earth. It was formed 36 million years ago when the faults collapsed when the Andes were uplifted in the late Eocene. In the geological history, sea water and fresh water have alternated many times, and have flooded the area. At the end of the last glacial period, the sea level rose, connecting Lake Maracaibo directly with the Atlantic Ocean, and the lighter fresh water floated on the heavier salt water, causing nutrients to be deposited on the bottom of the lake, resulting in the accumulation of a more than five-kilometre (3 mi) thick deposit of sediment on the bedrock.

In the Pliocene, the depression of today's Lake Maracaibo reached what would be practically its current form. The numerous rivers that flow into the lake have been defining its banks, especially those that form the southern delta of the lake, where the Escalante, Catatumbo and Santa Ana rivers converge.

Lake Maracaibo is located in the Maracaibo lowland in the faulted basin between the Perija Mountains and the Merida Mountains of the Eastern Cordillera Mountains in northwestern Venezuela. The lake is in the shape of a vase. It is 210 kilometres (130 mi) long from north to south, 121 kilometres (75 mi) wide from east to west, covers an area of 13,512 square kilometres (5,217 mi^{2}), the deepest is 35 metres (115 ft), the shore length is about 1,000 kilometres (620 mi), and the volume is about 280 cubic kilometres (67 mi^{3}). The largest river entering the lake, the Catatumbo River, enters the lake from west to east, providing 57% of the water entering the lake. In addition to the influence of the prevailing wind, the lake water circulates counterclockwise. There are also the Santa Ana River, Chama River, Motatán River, Escalante River, and about fifty other rivers which drain into it.

Lake Maracaibo is deep in the south and shallow in the north. The northern half of the lake, which looks like a bottleneck, is 55 kilometres (34 mi) long. The southeastern edge of the lake basin with a flat bottom is steep and the northwestern edge is gentle. The southern part is lighter due to river water injection, while the northern part is slightly salty due to tidal influence. The Catatumbo River forms a bird-foot-shaped delta in the southwest of the lake basin, and the surface lake water in the delta has a salinity of only 0.13%. However, the intrusion of seawater from the mouth of the lake makes the salinity of the bottom lake water higher, reaching 0.2–0.3%. The north is connected with the Gulf of Venezuela, and the spit at the mouth of the lake extends for about 26 kilometres (16 mi).

== Climate ==
The annual average temperature of the lake area is 28 °C (82 °F); the precipitation is more in the south and less in the north, and the average annual rainfall in the south is 1,400 mm (55 in). The mountain wind from the Andes at night contacts the warm and humid air over the lake surface, contributing to an average rainfall of 297 mm (11.7 in) per year. The meteorological phenomenon known as Catatumbo lightning takes place over the southern part of the lake, characterized by a continuous series of lightnings that are almost silent. This makes Lake Maracaibo the place with the most frequent lightning on Earth. There are about 233 lightning strikes per square kilometre in a year on average. The nocturnal thunderstorms occur on average about 297 days per year. At its peak in September, the lake area can experience up to 280 lightning strikes per hour, approximately 28 lightning strikes per minute, lasting up to nine hours, and capable of illuminating nighttime navigation.

== History ==
Maracaibo, Cabimas, Ciudad Ojeda and Gibraltar

The aboriginal Añú people who lived on the banks of the lake refer to it as Coquivacoa. The tribes of Wayuu, Caquetíos, and Quiriquires also lived in the area. When Italian navigator Amerigo Vespucci and Spanish explorer Alonso de Ojeda's fleet sailed here on August 24, 1499 (the first time Europeans entered this area), the stilt houses in which the Añú lived in reminded Vespucci of the Italian city of Venice, so he named the region Veneziola (Venezuela in Spanish), or "Little Venice". Spain made two attempts to establish settlements around the lake in 1529 and 1569, but it was not until 1574 that the city of Maracaibo was successfully established. The Privateer Henry Morgan raided settlements on the lake in the Spring of 1669 and defeated a Spanish squadron sent to intercept him. On July 24, 1823, Venezuela won the famous Battle of Lake Maracaibo on the lake during the Venezuelan War of Independence.

The original depth of the lake mouth, which was only about 4 metres (13 ft) deep, was increased to 8 metres (26 ft) after dredging in the 1930s, and the three-kilometre (2 mi)-long stone breakwater was further increased to 11 metres (36 ft) after its completion in 1957, allowing ocean-going tankers to enter the lake, At the same time, the northern part, which was originally fresh water, became brackish. The 8,678-metre (5.4 mi) General Rafael Urdaneta Bridge over the lake connecting Maracaibo and Santa Rita was completed in 1962.

== Industry ==
Lake Maracaibo is rich in oil and gas resources and is known as the "oil lake". The first Spaniards who arrived used tar seeping from the lake to fill ship cracks. The Maracaibo oil field was discovered in 1914, the first oil well was constructed in 1917, and large-scale exploitation began in 1922. The oil fields are concentrated in the northeast and northwest of the lake, and the oil-producing layers are mainly Tertiary sandstone and Cretaceous limestone, with a hydrocarbon-bearing area of 1,300 square kilometres (500 mi^{2}), mainly concentrated in the coastal waters 105 kilometres (65 mi) long and 32 kilometres (20 mi) wide in the east of the lake.

On the northwest coast is the capital of Zulia State, Maracaibo, the second largest city in Venezuela and an important oil export port in the world. The lake area is also an important fishing and agricultural production area in Venezuela, supporting more than 20,000 fishermen, many of whom live in colorful traditional stilt houses built with iron sheets on the lake. The main crops on the south bank of the lake are bananas, peanuts, cocoa, coconut, sugar cane and coffee, the western shore of the lake developed dairy industry.

Lake Maracaibo and the Catatumbo River are the main traffic lines for the transportation of commodities in the nearby area, and the city of Maracaibo is the transshipment center of coffee produced in the Andes. The waterway can pass through oil tankers and other large sea-going ships, exporting crude oil and agricultural and livestock products from the Andean mountains and lakes. The Lake District is home to a quarter of Venezuela's population, and with the influx of farmers from the nearby Andes, the population of the Lake District increased from about 300,000 in 1936 to over 3.62 million in 2007.

== Nature ==
Lake Maracaibo possesses highly oxygenated waters which makes it rich in algae, and in turn fish, making it very biologically diverse. It is home to clams, blue crabs, shrimp and other aquatic products, and is also home to two red-listed aquatic mammals, the Guiana dolphin and the West Indian manatee, which is critically endangered in Venezuela. About 145 species of fish inhabit the lake, including many endemic species such as the Maracaibo half-hooked catfish (Hypostomus maracaiboensis), the Maracaibo hairy catfish (Trichomycterus maracaiboensis), the Maracaibo Lake Lamont catfish (Lamontichthys maracaibero), Lake Maracaibo tetra (Bryconamericus motatanensis), and Maracaibo wolf anchovies (Lycengraulis limnichthys) living in surface waters.

The lake has been drilled about 14,000 times, and more than 24,000 kilometres (15,000 mi) of oil and gas pipelines criss-cross the lake floor, but most of these pipelines are half a century old, with oil leaking from many aging underwater pipes. Before the 1950s, the lake water could still be used directly for domestic use, but then due to the intrusion of tidal salt water caused by the widening of the lake mouth channel, the salinity of the northern lake area increased by about 1,000%, and the south also increased by 300–500%.

== Contamination ==
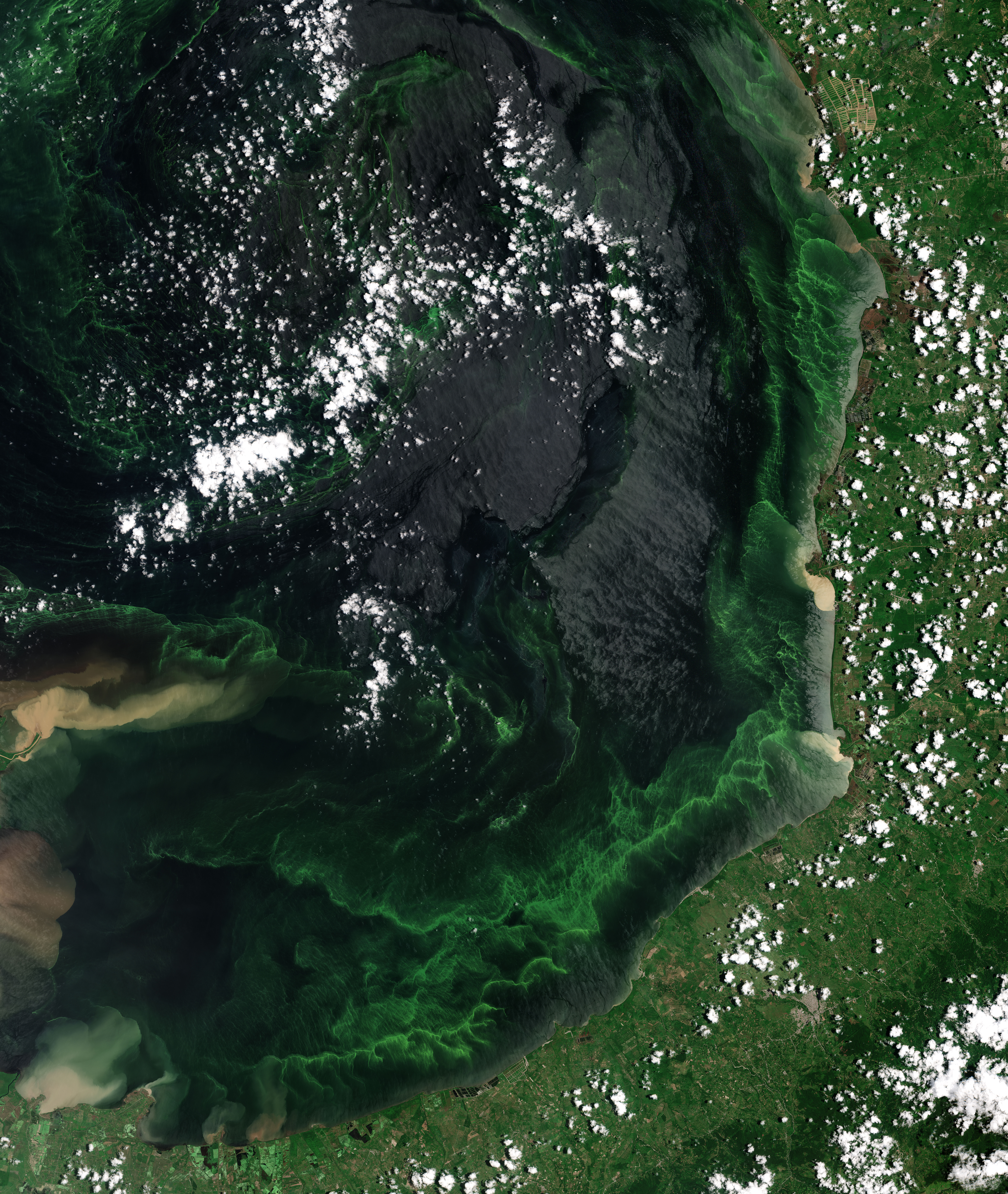

1 / Algae bloom

In lakeside towns such as the city of Maracaibo, the lake water is contaminated with E. coli from feces, oil pollution, and eutrophication caused by agricultural sewage discharged into the lake, as well as domestic and industrial wastewater, resulting in the blooms of duckweed and green algae. The presence of large amounts of duckweed blocks the passage of sunlight, significantly affecting biological cycles, preventing the development of native algae and plant species. Additionally, duckweed residues accumulate at the bottom, generating a layer of organic elements that produces large amounts of ammonium, methane and other compounds whose saturation causes eutrophication of the waters.

In the spring of 2004, heavy rains fell in the Lake Maracaibo basin, causing a large influx of fresh water into the lake. This caused nutrients originally deposited on the bottom of the lake to float to the surface of the lake, which in turn allowed the duckweed to rapidly multiply and triggered a bloom that lasted for up to eight months. The blooms were noted in June to have covered 18% of the lake, and the local government had to begin spending about $2 million per month on cleanup work.

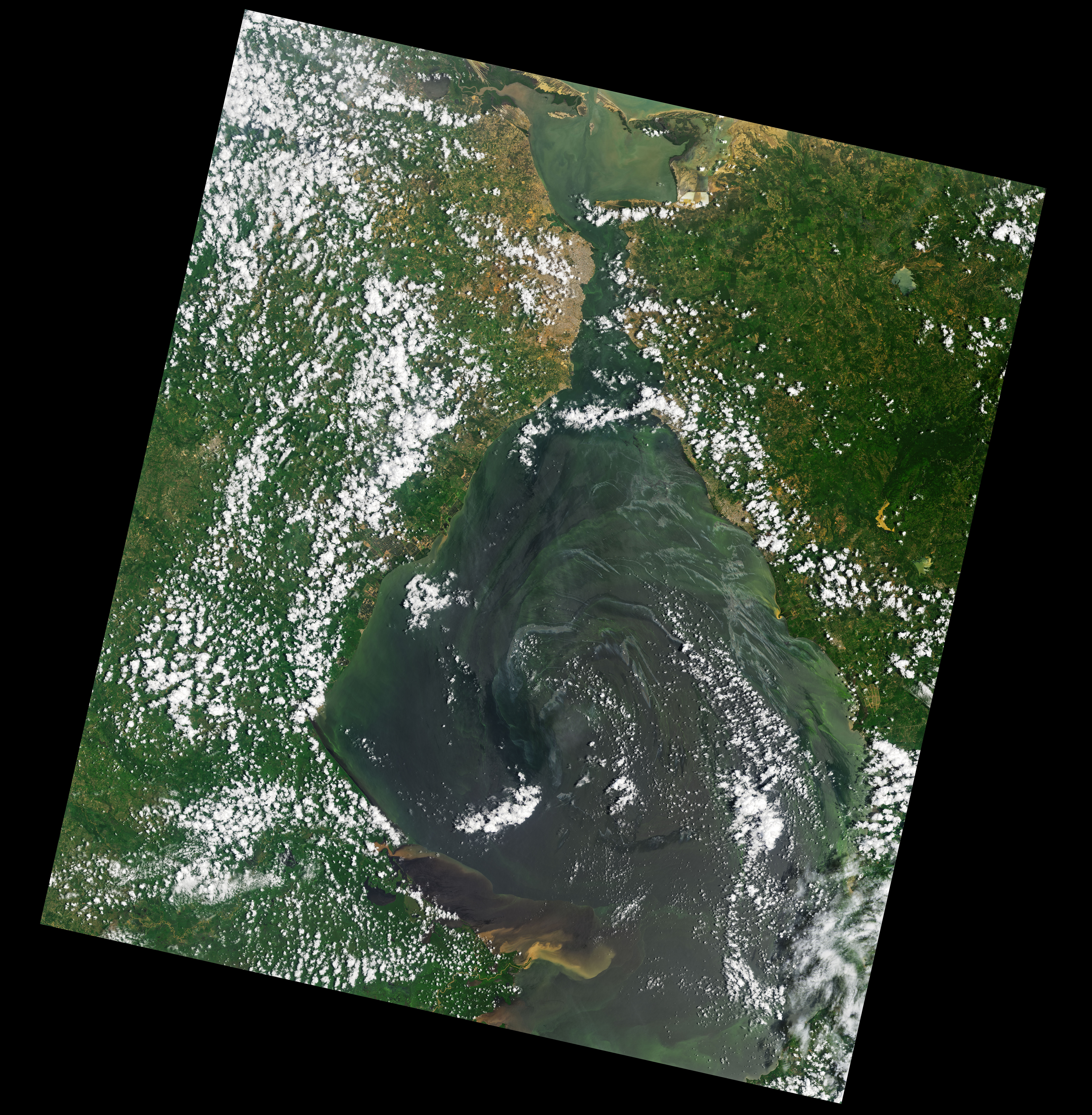

Numerous oil spills, at least partly attributed to deficient maintenance, and the indiscriminate discharge of sewage without prior treatment, have significantly deteriorated the water quality, to the point that in some parts of the Zulia area, the water presents levels of contamination that are very dangerous for health.

Within the existing polluting activities, the mining of mineral coal has started more recently, which further contaminates the basin with pollutants.

Likewise, the so-called cañadas, which are random drainage courses, drag large amounts of garbage from the human settlements that are in their path to the lake. In addition to this, residential waste such as plastic bags and bottles are also added. These pollutants all eventually get carried into the lake.

== Islands ==
There are many islands in the lake. Some primarily consist of sedimentary rock, such as the Zapara, Pescadores, and San Carlos islands (which is geographically a peninsula), while others like Toas have tectonic origins. The majority of the islands are located in the area of the Tablazo Bay and forms the Almirante Padilla municipality. The islands of Burro, Providencia, Hijacal, Pájaros, and the artificial islands are located at the neck of the lake and belong to other municipalities.

Natural islands of Lake Maracaibo:

- Uranden - Small island.
- San Carlos Island (Peninsula)
- Zapara Island
- Toas Island
- Providence Island
- Pescadores Island
- Los Pájaros Island
- Burro Island
- Hicacal Island

Artificial islands of Lake Maracaibo:

- Dorada Island – Residential complex in the Coquivacoa Parish of the city of Maracaibo.
- La Salina Island – Island created for the filling of oil tankers in the city of Cabimas. The only island in the sack of the lake.

== Bridge ==
The 8,678-metre (28,471 ft) long General Rafael Urdaneta Bridge connects the western and eastern coast of the lake together. It held the record for being the longest cable-stayed concrete bridge in the world at the time of its inauguration in 1962. Located in the southern part of the Strait of Maracaibo, it is a vehicles-only bridge that accommodates both directions of traffic, while its height allows for the passage of vessels up to 45 metres (150 ft) in height.

== Photos ==
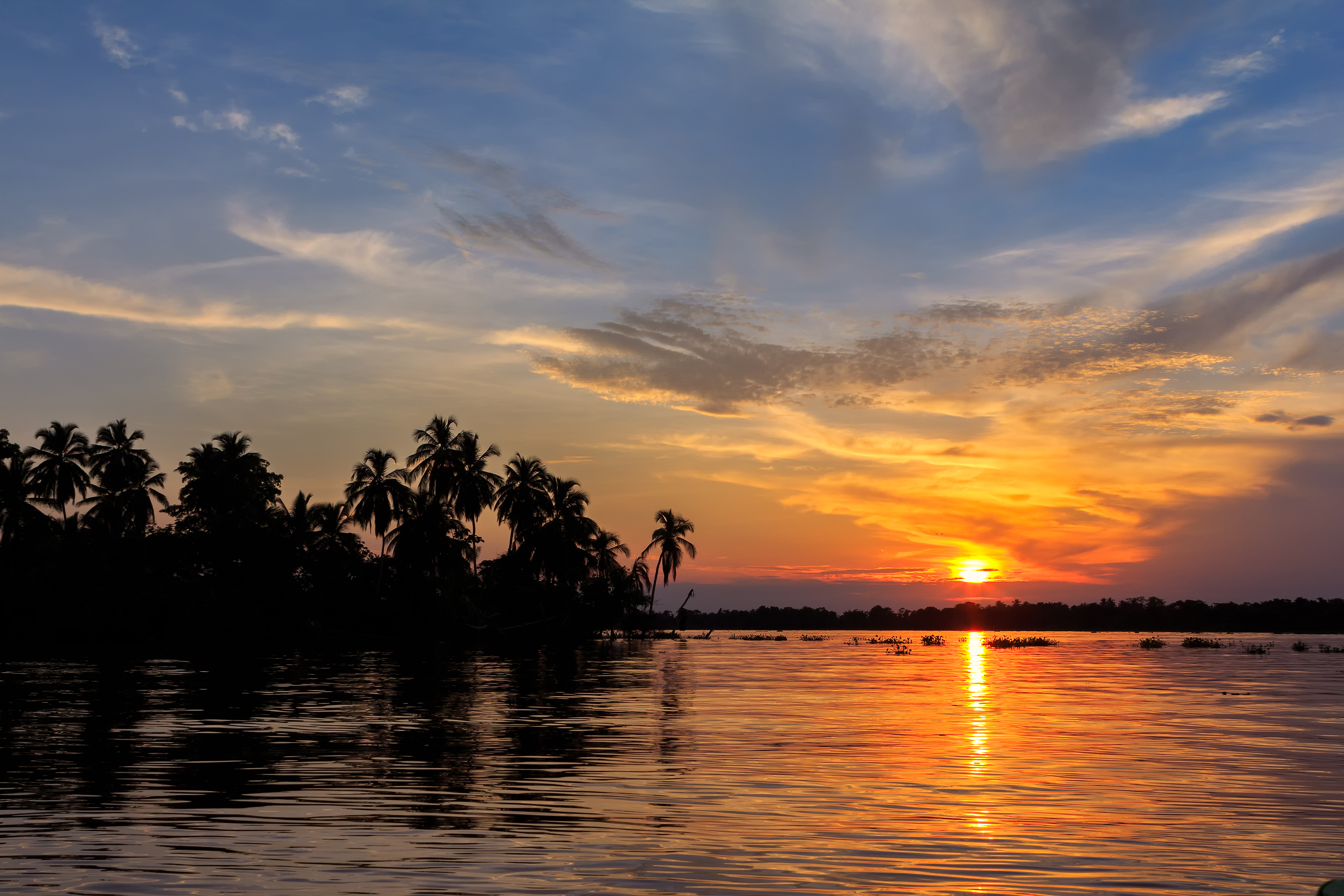
Sunset at Congo Mirador

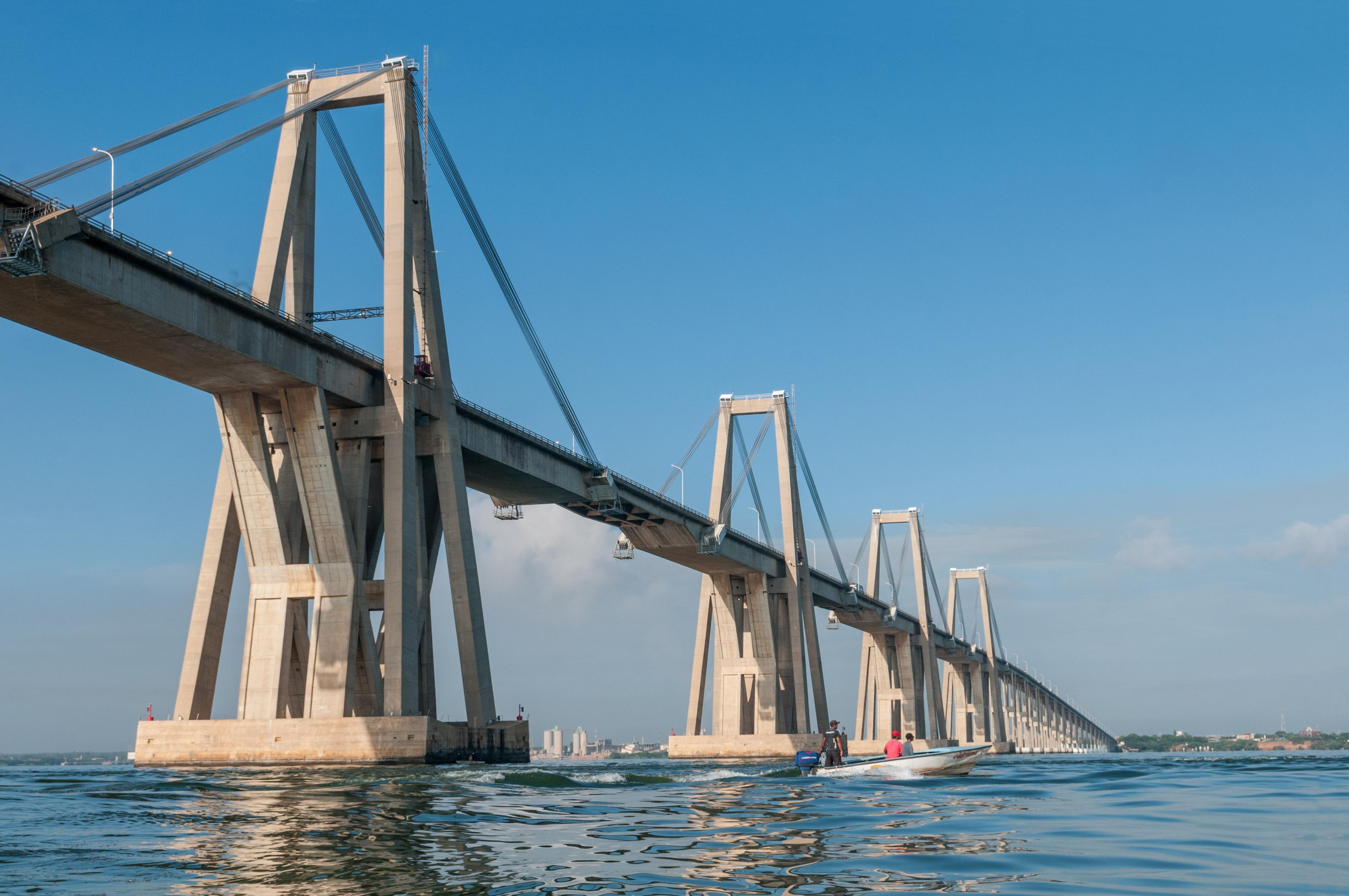
General Rafael Urdaneta Bridge

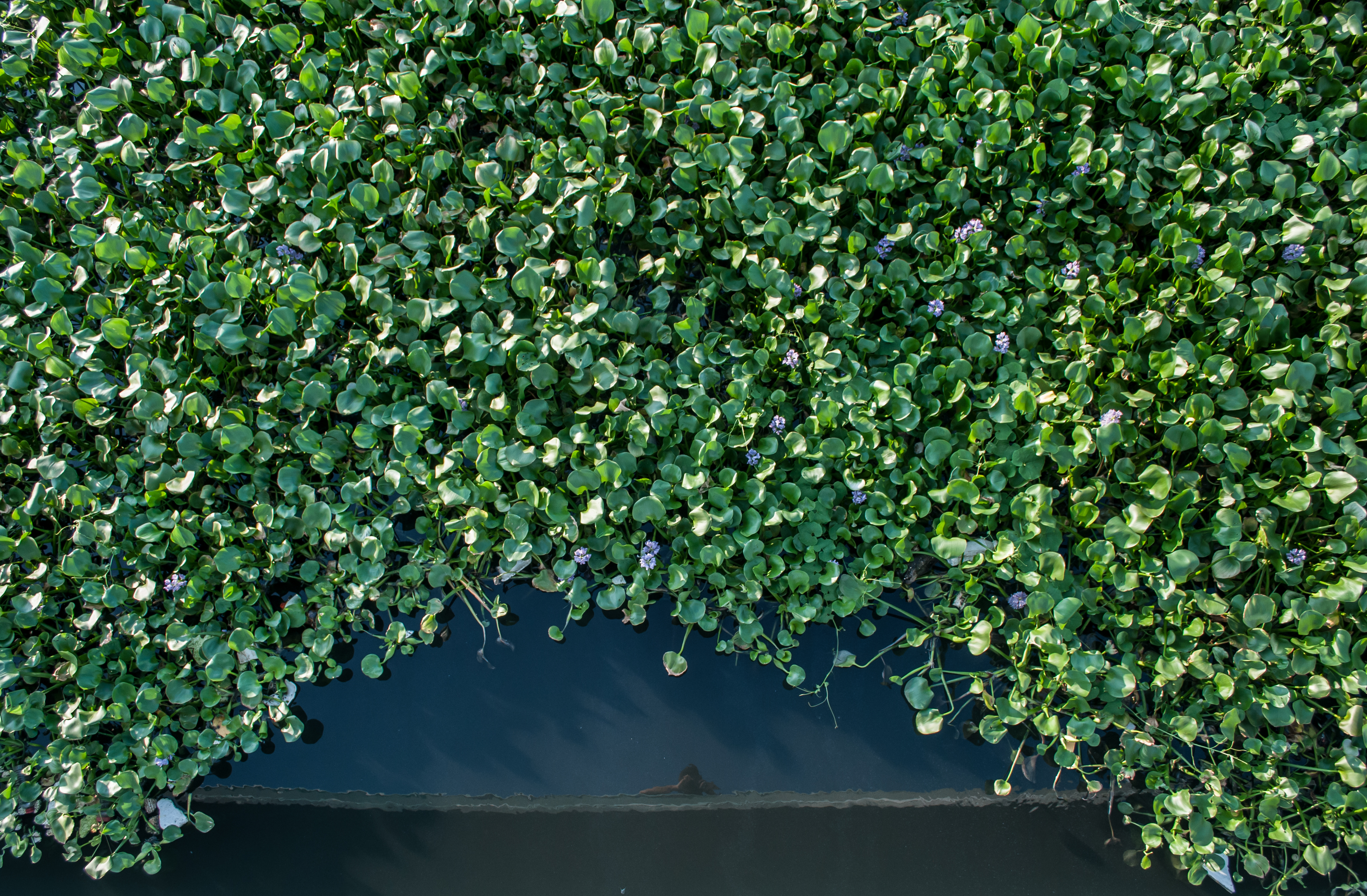
Lenteja Acuatica in lake

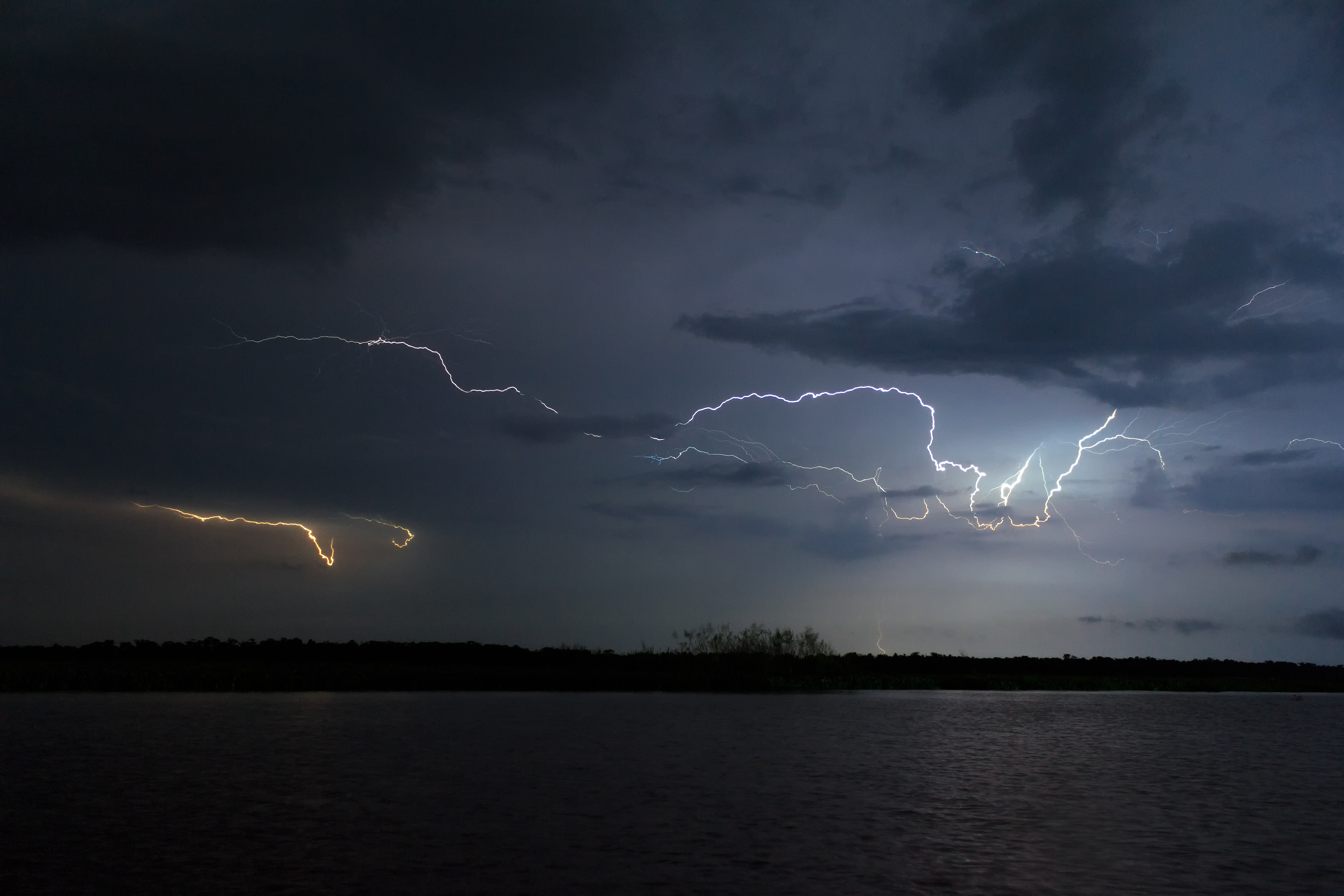
Catatumbo Lightning
