= Francesca LaMonte =

Ichthyologist

Francesca Raimonde LaMonte
- Born: 5 June 1895; Germany
- Died: 26 December 1982 (aged 87)
- Citizenship: United States
- Education: Wellesley College
- Known for: Founding Member of the IGFA Notable Ichthyologist
- Scientific career
- Fields: Ichthyology

Francesca Raimonde LaMonte (or La Monte; 1895–1982) was a noted ichthyologist and a founding figure of the International Game Fish Association. Her notable academic work includes illustrating and writing the popular book, "North American Game Fishes" which is an illustrated guide for identifying and fishing for game fish species in North America.

== Personal life ==
Francesca Lamonte was born in Germany to American and Armenian parents on June 5, 1895. Francesca's father passed away from unknown causes four years after she was born, and her mother remarried shortly after. As both LaMonte and her mother were Daughters of the American Revolution, Francesca was afforded societal advantages that assisted her admission into college. She graduated from Wellesley College in 1918 having accomplished a Bachelor of Arts degree and a certificate in Music. She died on December 26, 1982.

== Career ==
LaMonte's first foray into professional work at the American Museum of Natural History in New York was as an editorial assistant on A Bibliography of Fishes authored by Bashford Dean in 1919. She continued to work at the American Museum of Natural History for the rest of her career. LaMonte worked as an Assistant Curator at the American Museum of Natural History from 1920 to 1962. She began working with the museum two years after graduating from Wellesley College by translating scientific articles to English from French, German, Spanish, Italian, and Russian. LaMonte conducted significant field work, specializing in marine big game fish such as marlins and swordfish.

During the 1939 Lerner Australia/New Zealand Expedition of which LaMonte was a part of, the idea for an international organization supporting anglers was formed. This idea spawned the International Game Fish Association (IGFA) which was founded on June 7, 1939. Part of the purpose of the IGFA was to create a documenting organization for world record catches and provide resources to anglers. LaMonte became the first secretary for the International Game Fish Association. As her career continued, LaMonte held various offices in the International Game Fish Association and was inducted into the IGFA Hall of Fame. This accomplishment made her the first woman to do so in the history of the organization. LaMonte was in a position of leadership for the Lerner–American Museum Big Game Fish Expedition to Peru/Chile as the Scientific Leader in 1940. She was considered an authority on sportfish and was given the informal title of "fish expert" by Ernest Hemingway, who also was a founding figure of the IGFA.

LaMonte authored numerous scientific papers and best-selling fishing guides with vivid descriptors. It is estimated that she published 86 articles and several books. She was a coeditor on all of the IGFA's early published papers. Her years of science writing gained her the respect of prominent literary figures, including Ernest Hemingway, whom she advised on fish anatomical descriptions. Ernest Hemingway coauthored the book "Game Fish of the World" with LaMonte in 1949. The genus of the South American armored catfish (Lamontichthys) is named after her, immortalizing her contributions to fish conservation.

LaMonte was the Curator Emerita for the American Museum of Natural History after her retirement and until her death in 1982.

== Notable works ==
- LaMonte, F. (1945). North American Game Fishes. Garden City, NY: Doubleday, Doran & Co

== See also ==
- Category:Taxa named by Francesca LaMonte
