= Serranía de Macuira =

Mountain range in Colombia

Serrania de Macuira
- Location within Colombia

Highest point
- Peak: Cerro Paluou
- Elevation: 864 m (2,835 ft)

Dimensions
- Length: 35 km (22 mi)
- Width: 10 km (6.2 mi)

Geography
- Country: Colombia
- Region: La Guajira
- Range coordinates: 12°10′00″N 71°20′00″W

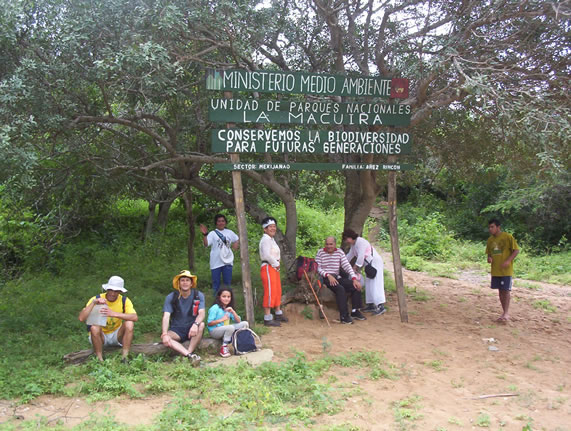
Entrance to the National Natural Park of Macuira

Serranía de Macuira is a mountain range in northern Colombia located in the municipality of Uribia, La Guajira. The Serrania de Macuira stands in the middle of the La Guajira Desert at 864 m (2,835 ft) isolated from the Sierra Nevada de Santa Marta and the Eastern Ranges of the Colombian Andes. The range is a protected area; National Natural Park Macuira.

The Serranía de Macuira measures around 35 kilometres (22 mi) in length and is circa 10 kilometres (6.2 mi) wide, at approximately 10 kilometres (6.2 mi) from the Caribbean Sea. The range is composed of three mountain massifs that are interconnected; the highest being Cerro Paluou (864 m (2,835 ft)), Cerro de Jibome (753 m (2,470 ft)) covering a total area of 250 km^{2} (97 sq mi). The area is home to numerous species of fauna and flora and due to its relatively high humidity caused by the trade winds and its proximity to the Caribbean sea it presents a forest of dwarf trees and cloud forests. The frog Allobates wayuu is only known from the Serranía de Macuira.
