= Bahia Honda (Colombia) =

Bahía Honda
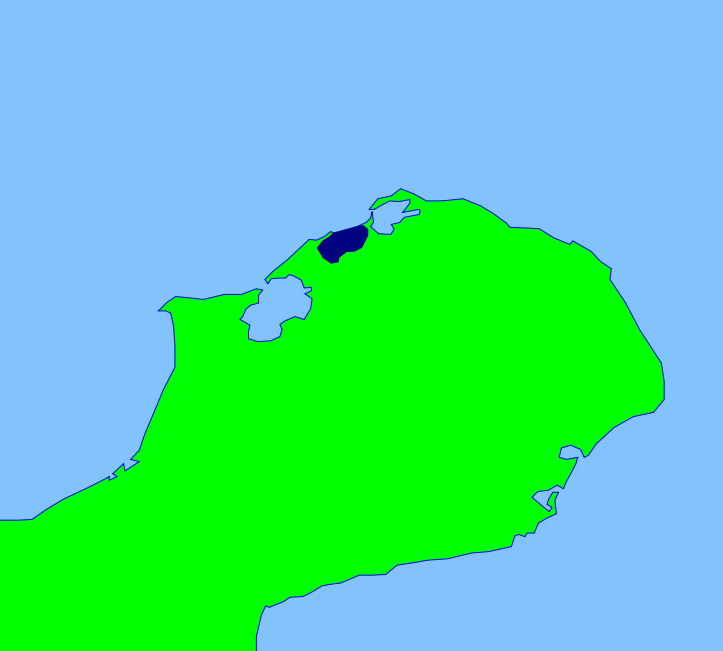
- Bahia Honda in blue

- Location within Colombia
- Location: La Guajira, Colombia
- Coordinates: 12°20.75′N 71°46.45′W
- Ocean/sea sources: Caribbean Sea
- Basin countries: Colombia

Bahia Honda is a bay in La Guajira, Colombia on the Atlantic Ocean. It lies approximately 40 miles (64 km) from the Venezuelan border on the Guajira Peninsula in the northeast region of Colombia. The bay opens to the Caribbean Sea.
