= La Guajira Desert =

Desert in Colombia and Venezuela

Coordinates: 12°04′18″N 71°35′52″W

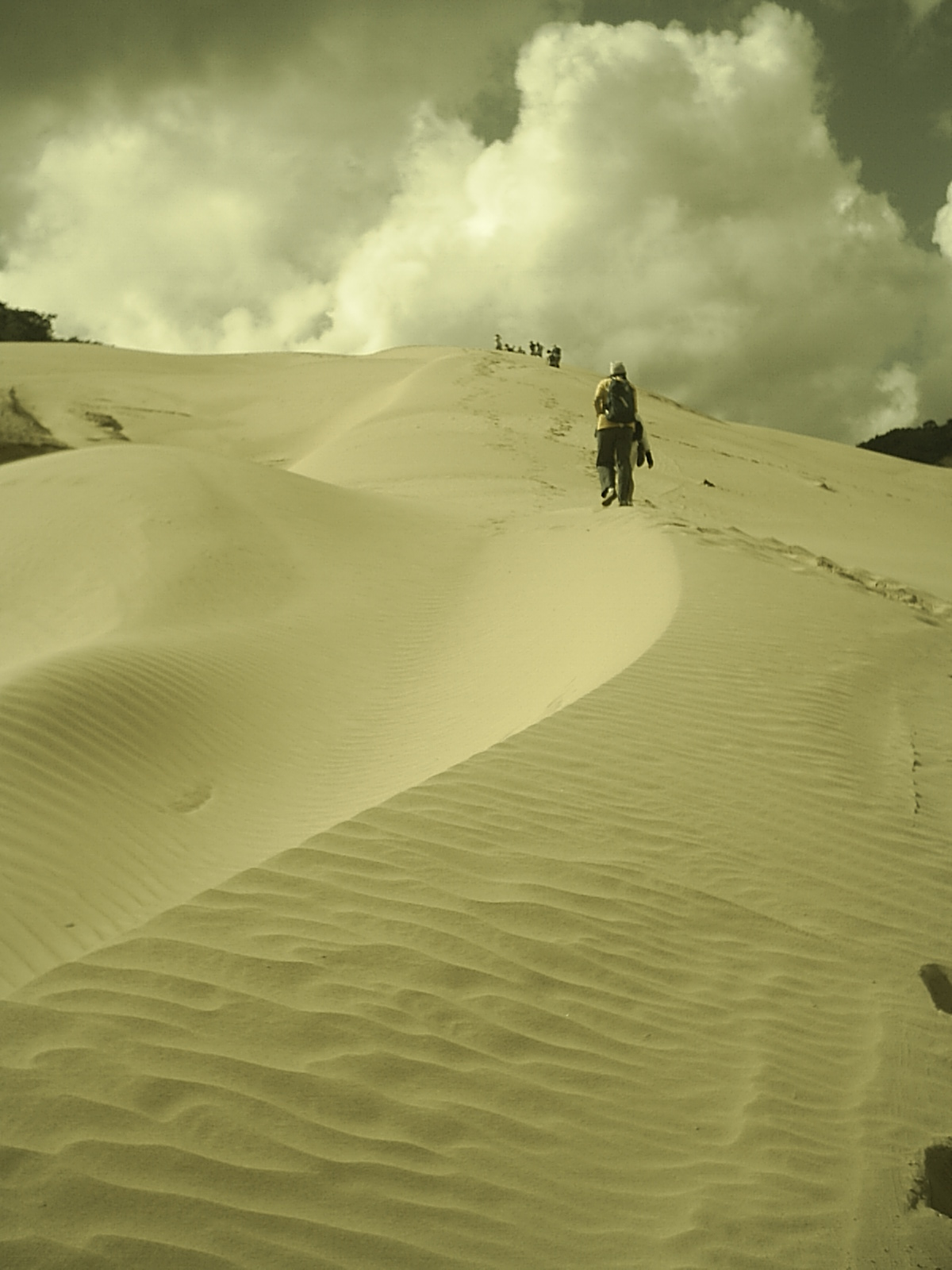
Dunes in La Guajira Desert

The La Guajira Desert [la ɣwaˈxiɾa] (Wayuu: Woumainkat Wajiira, Spanish: Desierto de La Guajira) is a desert located in northern Colombia and Venezuela, approximately 1,100 km (680 mi) north of Bogotá, covering most of the La Guajira Peninsula at the northernmost tip of South America. It is the continent's largest desert north of the equator. Most of the region is within Colombia's La Guajira Department, though a small portion is in the Venezuelan state of Zulia. The area holds immense coal reserves which are exploited in a zone known as El Cerrejón. It is also home to the indigenous Wayuu people. The Wayuu are mostly herders but also master deep-sea divers, known for collecting pearls from the Caribbean Sea.

The peninsula is populated chiefly by xeric scrubland, which is home to a large variety of flora and fauna. The National Natural Park of Macuira, established in 1977, is a tropical oasis located in the La Guajira Desert. The park covers 25,000 hectares (62,000 acres) in La Guajira's only mountain chain and ranges in altitude from sea level to 450 metres (1,480 ft). It has a warm climate that averages about 27 °C (81 °F).
