= Guajira Peninsula =

Geographic feature in northeastern Colombia and northwestern Venezuela

Coordinates: 12.000°N 71.500°W

- People: Wayuu
- Language: Wayuunaiki
- Country: Wajiira

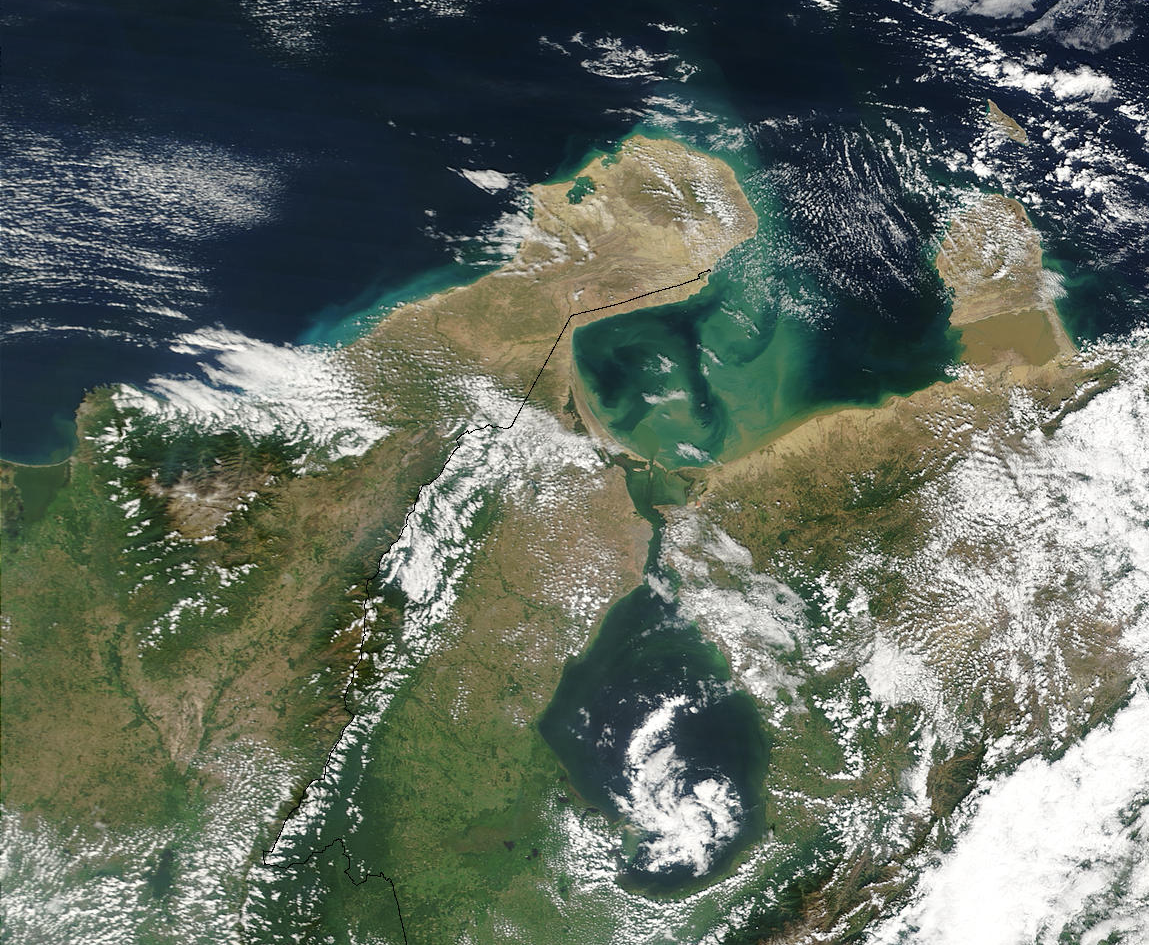
An aerial view of the Guajira Peninsula (top center), including parts of Colombia and Venezuela west of the Gulf of Venezuela and south of the Caribbean Sea

The Guajira Peninsula (Spanish pronunciation: [ɡwaˈxiɾa]; Spanish: Península de La Guajira, also spelled Goajira, mainly in colonial period texts, Wayuu: Woumainpa’a) is a peninsula in northern Colombia and northwestern Venezuela in the Caribbean. It is the northernmost peninsula in South America and has an area of 25,000 km^{2} (9,700 sq mi) extending from the Manaure Bay (Colombia) to the Calabozo Ensenada in the Gulf of Venezuela (Venezuela), and from the Caribbean to the Serranía del Perijá mountains range.

It was the subject of a historic dispute between Venezuela and Colombia in 1891, and on arbitration was awarded to the latter and joined to its Magdalena Department. Nowadays, most of the territory is part of Colombia, making it part of La Guajira Department. The remaining strip is part of the Venezuelan Zulia State. The northernmost part of the peninsula is called Punta Gallinas (12° 28´ N) and is also considered the northernmost part of mainland South America.

== Etymology ==
The name Guajira comes from the Cariban languages; it is the Spanish pronunciation of Wajiira or Wahiira. According to Picon, the word Guajiros was first used in the year 1600 to designate some 200 indigenous families inhabiting the region of Riohacha. They were known for having large herds of goats. The Spanish applied the term to all the indigenous in the peninsula who were goat herders. According to Oliver, the term Guajiro did not appear on Spanish records until the year 1626, in a document by a friar named Pedro Simón.

== Climate ==
The region receives the flow of the trade winds from the northern hemisphere. The northeastern coast of Venezuela and the Antilles have Guajira-Barranquilla xeric scrub. The trade winds cause a resurgence of the deep littoral waters and make the sea more rich in living species on the western side of the peninsula. The northeastern flank of the Sierra Nevada de Santa Marta mountain range acts as a barrier that generates abundant rainfall in its steppes, forming the headwaters of the Ranchería River, the only major river in the area. Climate and vegetation varies from south to north, presenting hyper-humid jungle weather in the southern part, with 3,000 mm (120 in) of rainfall a year, to the desertic areas in the north, with 300 mm (12 in) a year.

In the northern area, a small range of mountains known as the Macuira reaches 900 metres (3,000 ft) above sea level; they trap some of the trade winds and mist forms. Most of the mountain range is a protected area called National Natural Park of Macuira. Nearby there is also the eighty-square-kilometre (31 sq mi) Flamingos Fauna and Flora Sanctuary.

== Economy ==
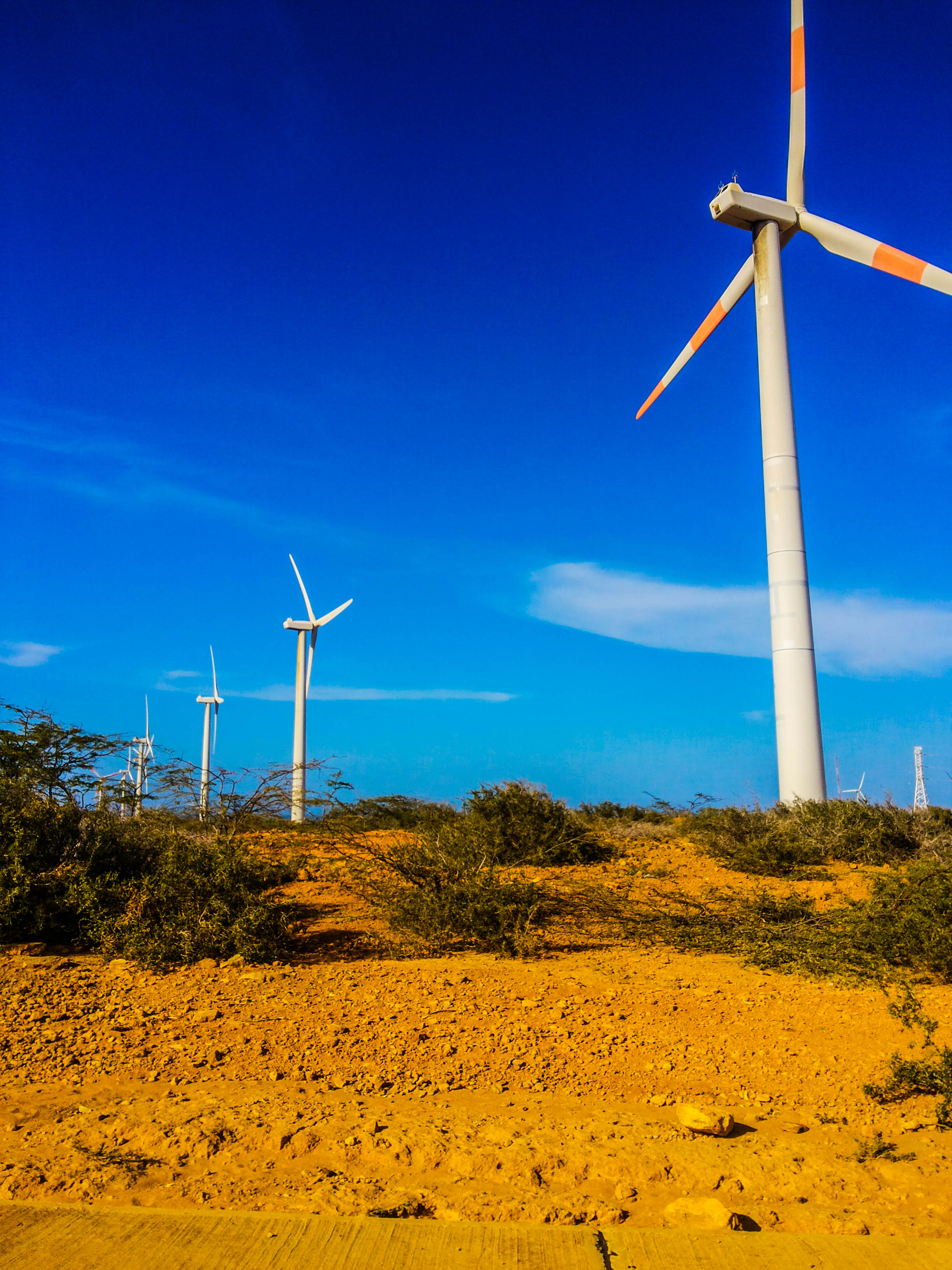
A Jepirachi wind farm in the desert of the Guajira Peninsula

The peninsula is inhabited mainly by members of the native tribe of the Wayuu, who use the plains to raise cattle, sheep, goats and horses. The descendants of Spanish colonists settled in the southeastern part of the peninsula, sometimes referred to as the Padilla Province. This has more fertile land, due to the proximity to other river basins, such as the Cesar River basin. It has been developed for large plantations of cotton and sorghum, and for cattle ranching.

Since the 1980s the central area of the peninsula was subject to the exploration and exploitation of coal and natural gas in the area of Cerrejón and of oil in the littoral. A popular ecotourism destination in the area is Cabo de la Vela, a headland and village on the peninsula on the Colombia side.

== Missionary history ==
The mission of Goajira was carried out since the 1880s by Capuchin friars. It was elevated by Pope Pius X on 17 January 1905, into a vicariate Apostolic, dependent on the Congregation for Extraordinary Ecclesiastical Affairs. Attanasio Maria Vincenzo Soler-Royo was appointed to the vicariate, as titular Bishop of Citharizum, on 18 April 1907. The early 20th-century missionaries described the inhabitants of the area as:

"tall and well made. Formerly they were very intractable, but the Capuchins, who were in charge of the Catholic missions, have had a great influence over them, and large numbers have been converted. The chief towns are Paraguaipoa, Calabacito, Maricha, Marocaso, and Soldado, La Guajira."

The Capuchins established three major orphanages, where they educated Wayuu children in Catholicism, Spanish, and European culture. In the 21st century, the government no longer requires Catholic education for the indigenous peoples. They are allowed to educate their children in the Wayuu traditions and language (Wayuunaiki).

== See also ==
- Distocyclus goajira, an electric fish
- T-63 Goajira, a ship of the navy of Venezuela
- Guajira Department, Guajira-Barranquilla xeric scrub and La Guajira Desert
