= Puerto Bolívar, Colombia =

Puerto Bolívar
- Location in La Guajira Department and Colombia Puerto Bolívar (Colombia)
- Coordinates: 12°15′20″N 71°58′0.01″W
- Country: Colombia
- Department: La Guajira Department
- Municipality: Uribia Municipality
- Time zone: UTC-5 (Colombia Standard Time)

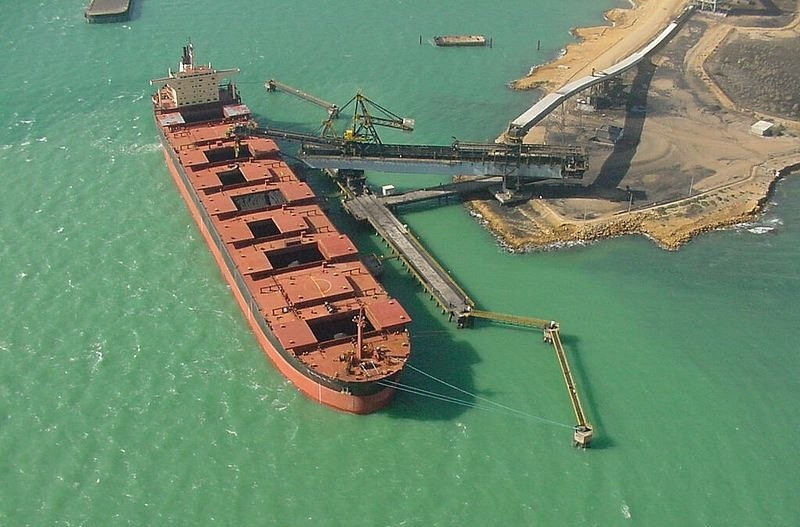
Puerto Bolívar

Puerto Bolívar is a maritime port in the municipality of Uribia in the La Guajira Department of Colombia. It is the largest Colombian port. The port is located in the south head of Bahia Portete, an area of permanent winds and low rainfall, 75 km (47 mi) north of the city of Uribia and 166 km (103 mi) of Riohacha.

== History ==
The Port of Puerto Bolívar, was created by decree No. 995 of April 5, 1982 by the President of Colombia, Julio César Turbay Ayala, with the name of Harbormaster of Bahia Portete in order to consolidate the presence of the state in this region of Colombia and exercise sovereignty through maritime legislation on domestic and foreign motor ships that arrived and sailed from Puerto Bolivar and quays of Portete and Puerto Nuevo. In 1986 during the administration of President Belisario Betancur its name was changed to Harbormaster of Puerto Bolívar.

== Infrastructure ==
Railway

- The tracks are 150 km (93 mi) in length, connecting the Puerto Bolívar with the Cerrejón mine
- The mine of the Cerrejón uses the only 1,435 mm (4 ft 8 1/2 in) standard gauge freight railway in the country

Port

- Largest coal-export port in Latin America
- Covered conveyor belts and a direct-loading system since 1985
- Receives vessels of up to 180,000 tonnes (180,000 long tons; 200,000 short tons)

Airport

- Puerto Bolívar Airport, 1,600 metres (5,200 ft) of runway
- Restricted flight area

Motorway

- A motorway 150 km (93 mi) long for operational support and access for the population of La Guajira since 1982. It links the southern part of the department with the northern part.

== Climate ==
Puerto Bolivar has a hot desert climate (Köppen BWh) with little to no rainfall in all months except September, October and November.

Climate data for Puerto Bolivar
Month	Jan	Feb	Mar	Apr	May	Jun	Jul	Aug	Sep	Oct	Nov	Dec	Year
Mean daily maximum °C (°F)	31.4 (88.5)	31.6 (88.9)	32.2 (90.0)	32.9 (91.2)	33.6 (92.5)	34.3 (93.7)	34.3 (93.7)	34.5 (94.1)	33.8 (92.8)	32.9 (91.2)	32.1 (89.8)	31.5 (88.7)	32.9 (91.3)
Daily mean °C (°F)	28.0 (82.4)	28.1 (82.6)	28.5 (83.3)	29.2 (84.6)	29.9 (85.8)	30.6 (87.1)	30.5 (86.9)	30.7 (87.3)	30.3 (86.5)	29.5 (85.1)	29.1 (84.4)	28.3 (82.9)	29.4 (84.9)
Mean daily minimum °C (°F)	24.6 (76.3)	24.5 (76.1)	24.9 (76.8)	25.6 (78.1)	26.3 (79.3)	26.8 (80.2)	26.6 (79.9)	26.9 (80.4)	26.9 (80.4)	26.1 (79.0)	26.0 (78.8)	25.2 (77.4)	25.9 (78.6)
Average rainfall mm (inches)	4.8 (0.19)	1.5 (0.06)	2.6 (0.10)	6.9 (0.27)	27.3 (1.07)	8.2 (0.32)	11.0 (0.43)	29.3 (1.15)	60.2 (2.37)	95.2 (3.75)	53.5 (2.11)	30.3 (1.19)	330.8 (13.01)
Average rainy days	2.0	1.0	0.5	1.5	3.1	1.6	1.6	4.2	7.1	9.8	6.9	4.6	43.9
Average relative humidity (%)	75.2	73.3	73.0	74.4	74.5	71.7	71.2	73.2	75.4	78.0	77.4	76.1	74.5
Mean monthly sunshine hours	279.2	258.2	270.4	244.0	245.4	239.5	276.1	281.1	235.8	222.2	228.8	260.2	3,040.9
Source: IDEAM
