= Junain =

- Vereda
- Location in La Guajira Department and Colombia Junain (Colombia)
- Coordinates: 12°13′52″N 72°0′22″W
- Country: Colombia
- Department: La Guajira Department
- Municipality: Uribia
- Elevation: 33 ft (10 m)
- Time zone: UTC-5 (Colombia Standard Time)

Junain is a vereda in Uribia Municipality, La Guajira Department, in Colombia.

== Climate ==
Junain has a hot arid climate (Köppen BWh) with little to no rainfall in all months except October and November.

Climate data for Junain
| Month | Jan | Feb | Mar | Apr | May | Jun | Jul | Aug | Sep | Oct | Nov | Dec | Year |
|---|---|---|---|---|---|---|---|---|---|---|---|---|---|
| Mean daily maximum °C (°F) | 31.5 (88.7) | 31.8 (89.2) | 32.3 (90.1) | 32.8 (91.0) | 33.6 (92.5) | 34.0 (93.2) | 34.6 (94.3) | 34.4 (93.9) | 34.0 (93.2) | 33.1 (91.6) | 32.4 (90.3) | 32.0 (89.6) | 33.0 (91.5) |
| Daily mean °C (°F) | 27.4 (81.3) | 27.6 (81.7) | 28.0 (82.4) | 28.5 (83.3) | 29.3 (84.7) | 29.8 (85.6) | 30.0 (86.0) | 30.0 (86.0) | 29.6 (85.3) | 29.0 (84.2) | 28.4 (83.1) | 27.8 (82.0) | 28.8 (83.8) |
| Mean daily minimum °C (°F) | 23.3 (73.9) | 23.4 (74.1) | 23.7 (74.7) | 24.3 (75.7) | 25.1 (77.2) | 25.6 (78.1) | 25.4 (77.7) | 25.6 (78.1) | 25.3 (77.5) | 24.9 (76.8) | 24.4 (75.9) | 23.7 (74.7) | 24.6 (76.2) |
| Average rainfall mm (inches) | 2 (0.1) | 2 (0.1) | 0 (0) | 20 (0.8) | 20 (0.8) | 10 (0.4) | 2 (0.1) | 11 (0.4) | 32 (1.3) | 91 (3.6) | 71 (2.8) | 21 (0.8) | 282 (11.2) |
Source: Climate-Data.org
