= Maicao Airport =

Maicao Airport La Majayura Airport
- IATA: none; ICAO: SKMJ

Summary
- Airport type: Public
- Serves: Maicao, Colombia
- Elevation AMSL: 160 ft / 49 m
- Coordinates: 11°23′20″N 72°14′30″W

Map
- Location of the airport in Colombia

Runways
Direction	Length		Surface
Direction	m	ft	Surface
07/25	1,550	5,085	Asphalt
- Sources: GCM Google Maps

Maicao Airport (ICAO: SKMJ) is an airport serving the city of Maicao, in the La Guajira Department of Colombia.

The airport may be closed. Google Earth Historical Imagery shows a control tower and terminal/hangar buildings were taken down sometime during 2013 or 2014. Its former IATA code of MCJ is now assigned to Jorge Isaacs Airport, 31 kilometres (19 mi) southwest of Maicao.

== See also ==
- Transport in Colombia
- List of airports in Colombia
