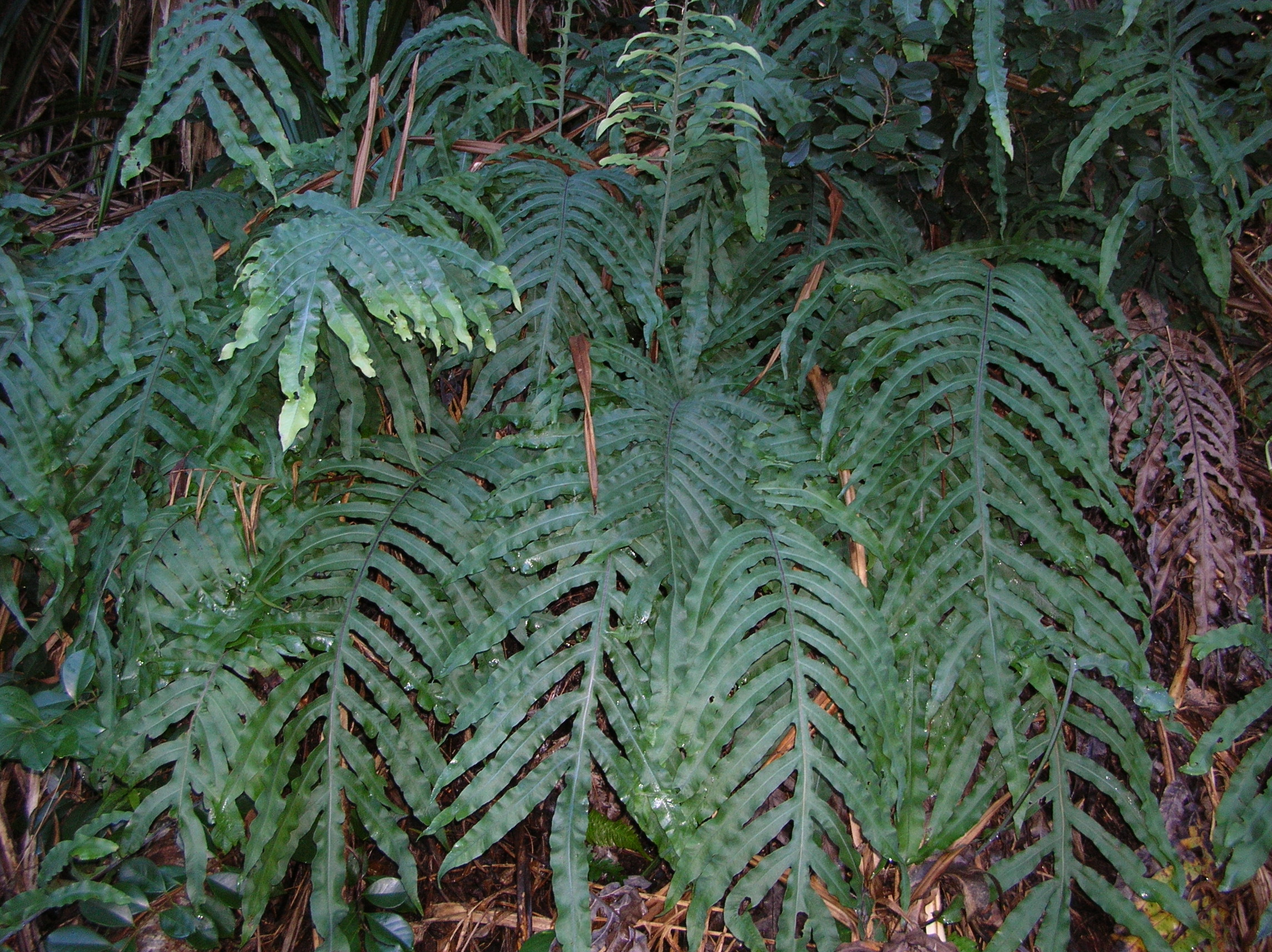
- Phlebodium aureum

Scientific classification
- Kingdom: Plantae
- Clade: Embryophytes
- Clade: Tracheophytes
- Division: Polypodiophyta
- Class: Polypodiopsida
- Order: Polypodiales
- Suborder: Polypodiineae
- Family: Polypodiaceae
- Subfamily: Polypodioideae
- Genus: Phlebodium (R.Br.) J.Sm.

Species
- See text.

Synonyms
- Polypodium sect. Phlebodium R.Br.

= Phlebodium =

Genus of ferns

Phlebodium is a small genus of ferns in the family Polypodiaceae, subfamily Polypodioideae, according to the Pteridophyte Phylogeny Group classification of 2016 (PPG I). It is native to tropical and subtropical regions of the Americas. Its species were formerly included in Polypodium.

They are epiphytic ferns, with a creeping, densely hairy or scaly rhizome bearing fronds at intervals along its length. The fronds are evergreen, persisting for 1–2 years, and are pinnatifid. The sori or groups of spore-cases (sporangia) are borne on the back of the frond.

== Species ==
As of February 2020, Checklist of Ferns and Lycophytes of the World accepted the following species:

Image	Scientific name	Distribution
	Phlebodium areolatum (Humb. & Bonpl. ex Willd.) J.Sm.	Mexico, Florida, some of the Caribbean islands, Central America, and South America to Argentina
	Phlebodium aureum (L.) J.Sm.	United States to Florida and the extreme southeast of Georgia, and south through the Caribbean (the Bahamas, Puerto Rico, and Lesser Antilles), and northern and eastern South America to Paraguay.
	Phlebodium decumanum (Willd.) J.Sm.	Central and South America

== See also ==
- Calaguala
