= Urumita =

Coordinates: 10°34′N 73°01′W

- Town
- Flag Coat of arms
- Nickname: "The Garden of La Guajira" (Spanish: El Jardin de La Guajira)
- Location of the town and municipality of Urumita in the Department of La Guajira.
- Country: Colombia
- Region: Caribbean
- Department: La Guajira
- Foundation: October 3, 1785 by Juan Bautista Canalete

Government
  - Mayor: Eunice Murgas Saurith (L)

Area
  - Total: 329 km^{2} (127 sq mi)
- Elevation: 255 m (837 ft)

Population (Census 2018)
  - Total: 10,198
- Time zone: UTC-5
- Climate: Aw
- Website: urumita-guajira.gov.co/

Urumita is a town and municipality of the Colombian Department of La Guajira.

== Geography ==
The municipality of Urumita is located on the Serranía del Perijá mountain range with part of its territory covering the valley of the Cesar River towards the Sierra Nevada de Santa Marta mountain range. The municipality seat of Urumita is however located on a flat area some 45 km away from the capital of the Department of Cesar, Valledupar and some 175 km from the capital city of the Department of La Guajira, Riohacha.

Urumita limits to the north with the municipality of Villanueva in a 36 km borderline; to the south with the municipality of La Jagua del Pilar sharing approximately 50 km; to the east with Venezuela, sharing 10 km; and to the west with the municipality of Valledupar sharing 15 km covering a total area of 329 km².

=== Climate ===
Climate in the municipality of Urumita is very warm to hot with an average temperature throughout the year of 28 °C or 82.4 °F varying only slightly over the year. There is a lengthy rainy season from April to November, with a slightly drier period mid-year, and a short, very dry season from mid-December to March. Under the Köppen climate classification, Urumita has a tropical savanna climate, labelled Aw on climate maps.

Climate data for Urumita, elevation 255 m (837 ft), (1981–2010)
Month	Jan	Feb	Mar	Apr	May	Jun	Jul	Aug	Sep	Oct	Nov	Dec	Year
Mean daily maximum °C (°F)	33.6 (92.5)	34.6 (94.3)	34.9 (94.8)	34.3 (93.7)	33.1 (91.6)	33.1 (91.6)	34.1 (93.4)	34.1 (93.4)	33.0 (91.4)	31.9 (89.4)	31.7 (89.1)	32.1 (89.8)	33.4 (92.1)
Daily mean °C (°F)	27.4 (81.3)	28.0 (82.4)	28.5 (83.3)	28.4 (83.1)	27.8 (82.0)	27.9 (82.2)	28.4 (83.1)	28.3 (82.9)	27.5 (81.5)	27.0 (80.6)	26.9 (80.4)	26.8 (80.2)	27.8 (82.0)
Mean daily minimum °C (°F)	21.0 (69.8)	21.4 (70.5)	22.0 (71.6)	22.8 (73.0)	22.8 (73.0)	22.7 (72.9)	22.6 (72.7)	22.7 (72.9)	22.3 (72.1)	22.0 (71.6)	22.0 (71.6)	21.5 (70.7)	22.2 (72.0)
Average precipitation mm (inches)	4.4 (0.17)	13.1 (0.52)	35.0 (1.38)	111.3 (4.38)	172.6 (6.80)	123.5 (4.86)	90.2 (3.55)	112.8 (4.44)	147.5 (5.81)	187.3 (7.37)	119.6 (4.71)	47.7 (1.88)	1,165 (45.9)
Average precipitation days	1	1	3	8	15	13	10	15	16	17	10	3	113
Average relative humidity (%)	66	65	64	65	69	69	67	67	70	72	72	70	68
Mean monthly sunshine hours	266.6	231.5	226.3	174.0	170.5	174.0	207.7	195.3	162.0	176.7	192.0	229.4	2,406
Mean daily sunshine hours	8.6	8.2	7.3	5.8	5.5	5.8	6.7	6.3	5.4	5.7	6.4	7.4	6.6
Source: Instituto de Hidrologia Meteorologia y Estudios Ambientales

== History ==
Prior to the arrival of the Spanish colonizers, the area of Urumita was inhabited by indigenous peoples pertaining to the Chimila. At the time of the Spanish arrival in the early 16th Century, the area was governed by a cacique named Uruma. After a period of conquest and colonization by the Spanish, on October 3, 1785 Juan Bautista Canalete founded the village of Urumita. The village became part of the jurisdiction of the municipality of Villanueva within the Government of Santa Marta. It was later made part of the Province of Padilla.

In 1972 Urumita became an autonomous corregimiento by Ordinance 043 of 1971 until 1978 when the Urumita was segregated from the municipality of Villanueva and became a relative status by Ordinance 016 of the same year. In 1982 the previous ordinance of 1978 is reconfirmed by ordinance 036 of 1982 rectifying the limits with Villanueva.

== Culture ==
The region has a large presence of Calagualas, a plant considered medicinal. It is used in various ways by the population of Urumita, and it is part of its popular culture. The locals celebrate the Festival y Reinado de las Flores y la Calaguala (Festival and Pageant of the Flowers and the Calaguala) in honor of the plant.
