= Manaure, La Guajira =

Manaure Seriita (Wayuu)
- Town
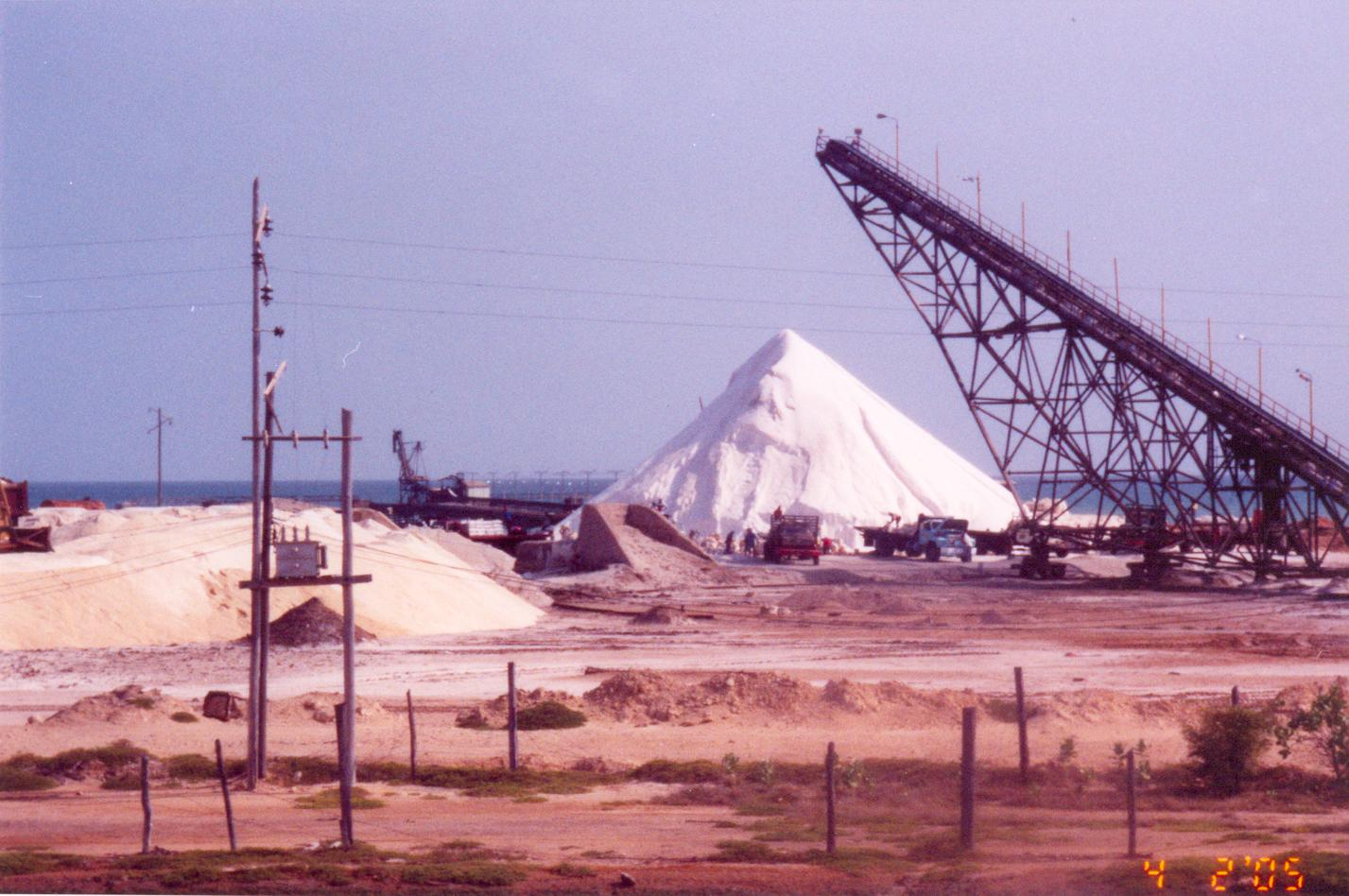
- Salt mines in Manaure, La Guajira

- Flag Coat of arms

- Location of the town and municipality of Manaure in the Department of La Guajira.

- Location within Colombia
- Coordinates: 11°46′45″N 72°26′58″W
- Country: Colombia
- Region: Caribbean
- Department: La Guajira
- Founded: 1723

Government
  - Mayor: Humberto Martinez Fajardo (C)

Area
  - Total: 1,971 km^{2} (761 sq mi)
- Elevation: 3 m (9.8 ft)

Population (2019 est.)
  - Total: 120,417
  - Density: 61.09/km^{2} (158.2/sq mi)
- Demonym: Manaurero
- Time zone: UTC-5
- Area code: 57 + 5
- Climate: BWh
- Website: Official website (in Spanish)

Manaure or Salinas de Manaure (Wayuu: Seriita) is a town and municipality located in the Colombian Department of La Guajira. Manaure's main economic activity is the exploitation of the vast amounts of salt in the area.

== Geography ==
The municipality of Manaure is located in northernmost part of South America, on the arid plains of the Guajira Peninsula, in the Colombian Caribbean region, bordering to the north with the Caribbean Sea to the east with the municipality of Uribia; to the south with the municipality of Maicao and to the west with the municipality of Riohacha.

The municipality of Manaure is within the Guajira-Barranquilla xeric scrub with water streams determined by precipitations during the rainy seasons. The municipality seat of Manaure is crossed by the Limón Creek which flows into the Caribbean sea. The coastline has high concentration of salt, rocks and clay over predominantly flat plains, slightly undulated in some areas.

=== Climate ===
Manaure has a hot arid climate (Köppen BWh) owing to its extremely high evaporation rates, despite receiving over 375 millimetres or 15 inches of rain in an average year. The weather is hot and dry throughout the year, averaging between 28 °C (82 °F) and 38 °C (100 °F) throughout the year with constant northeastern trade winds meaning evaporation and humidity are high. The area has a rainy season from August to November averaging around three-quarters of the annual rainfall, and also a shorter season of light rains during the month of May, with very little rain occurring in the remainder of the year.

Climate data for Manaure, elevation 1 m (3.3 ft), (1981–2010)
| Month | Jan | Feb | Mar | Apr | May | Jun | Jul | Aug | Sep | Oct | Nov | Dec | Year |
|---|---|---|---|---|---|---|---|---|---|---|---|---|---|
| Mean daily maximum °C (°F) | 32.3 (90.1) | 32.4 (90.3) | 32.6 (90.7) | 32.7 (90.9) | 33.4 (92.1) | 34.6 (94.3) | 35.0 (95.0) | 34.7 (94.5) | 33.8 (92.8) | 33.0 (91.4) | 32.6 (90.7) | 32.5 (90.5) | 33.3 (91.9) |
| Daily mean °C (°F) | 28.1 (82.6) | 28.0 (82.4) | 28.1 (82.6) | 28.5 (83.3) | 29.1 (84.4) | 29.9 (85.8) | 30.1 (86.2) | 29.4 (84.9) | 29.2 (84.6) | 28.7 (83.7) | 28.7 (83.7) | 28.3 (82.9) | 28.8 (83.8) |
| Mean daily minimum °C (°F) | 23.9 (75.0) | 24.0 (75.2) | 24.4 (75.9) | 24.3 (75.7) | 24.7 (76.5) | 25.3 (77.5) | 25.0 (77.0) | 25.0 (77.0) | 25.1 (77.2) | 24.7 (76.5) | 24.4 (75.9) | 24.1 (75.4) | 24.6 (76.3) |
| Average precipitation mm (inches) | 3.7 (0.15) | 2.9 (0.11) | 6.1 (0.24) | 19.1 (0.75) | 39.9 (1.57) | 14.1 (0.56) | 11.4 (0.45) | 33.6 (1.32) | 58.4 (2.30) | 114.1 (4.49) | 68.1 (2.68) | 22.2 (0.87) | 382.2 (15.05) |
| Average precipitation days | 1 | 1 | 1 | 2 | 3 | 2 | 1 | 3 | 6 | 8 | 6 | 4 | 36 |
| Average relative humidity (%) | 74 | 74 | 75 | 74 | 73 | 69 | 67 | 71 | 73 | 76 | 74 | 75 | 73 |
| Mean monthly sunshine hours | 235.6 | 203.3 | 217.0 | 186.0 | 201.5 | 231.0 | 235.6 | 248.0 | 213.0 | 195.3 | 201.0 | 207.7 | 2,575 |
| Mean daily sunshine hours | 7.6 | 7.2 | 7.0 | 6.2 | 6.5 | 7.7 | 7.6 | 8.0 | 7.1 | 6.3 | 6.7 | 6.7 | 7.1 |
Source: Instituto de Hidrologia Meteorologia y Estudios Ambientales

== History ==
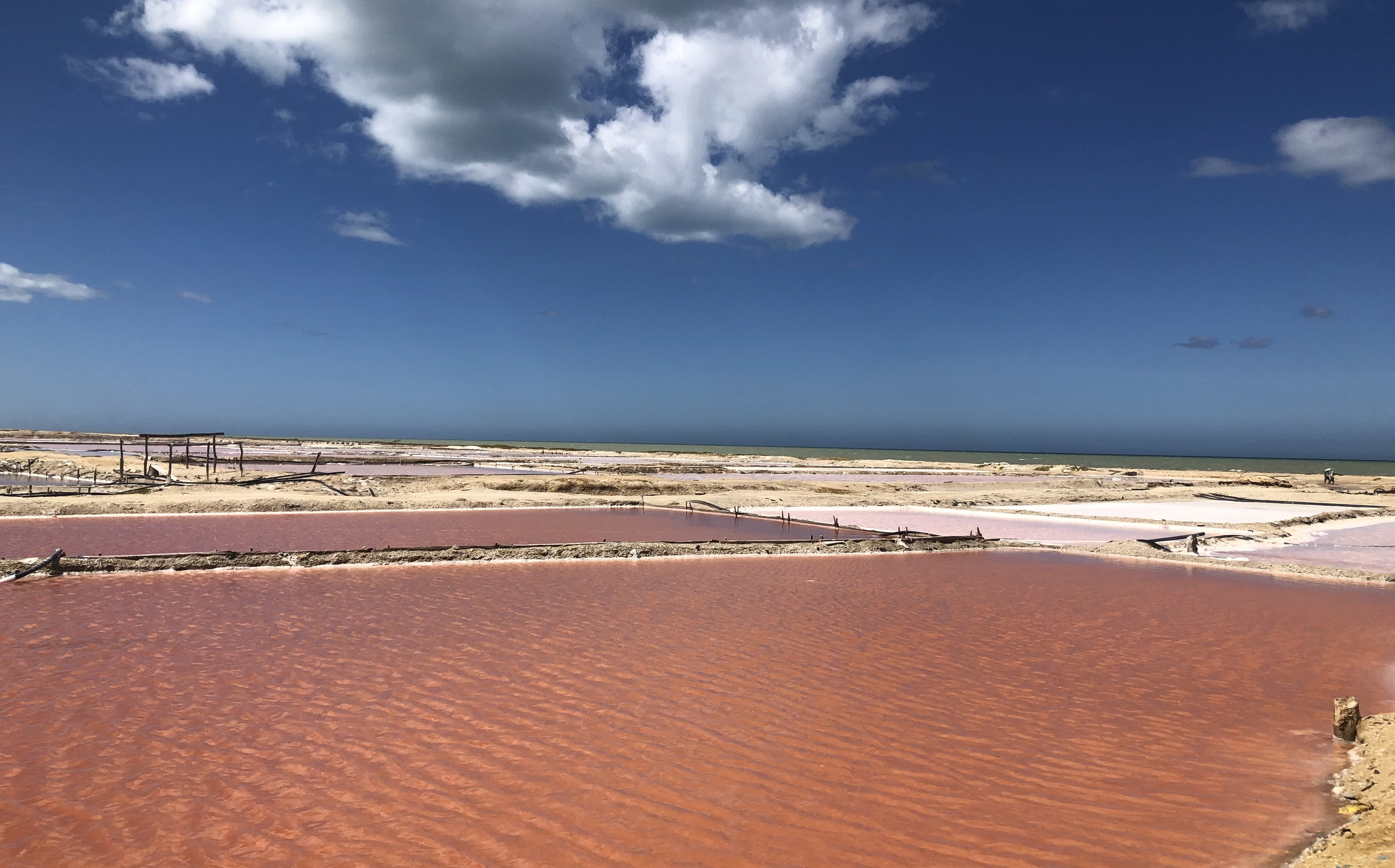
Manaure salt lagoons

Chronicles from the Spanish explorer first detailed some indigenous in the area called Coanaos which traveled between the Cabo de la Vela and the region of Valledupar to exchange salt for gold. During the 19th century salt in the region was exploited at Honda Bay and Quebrada Bay on coasts of what is part of the municipality of Manaure which naturally formed lagoons. In 1777 the Spanish government ordered the administration of the Salinas.

In 1824 the government declared the Salinas or salt mines as national patrimony of the nation establishing a regulatory price control. In 1932 the bank of the Republic was given authority over the administration and exploitation of salt mines in Zipaquirá, Nemocón and Sesquilé.

Industrial exploitation and processing of salt in Manaure began in the 1920s when the government gave concessions to individual investors for the exploitation of the salt mine and until the 1940s the mode of collection went from artisan to industrial, when the Bank of the Republic took over the Manaure salt mines. By 1948 salt production in Manaure was between 20,000 and 30,000 tons a year. In 1970 the concession of Manaure salt mines was transferred to the IFI-Concesión Salinas which intensified the production to one million tons a year.

The Wayuu began to claim the area as their ancestral land and historical owners of Manaure. In 1991 the government recognized the claim by the Wayuu and agreed to reorganize production and work conditions under a mixed economy, in which the indigenous would have 25% of the stocks in the company. The accords were not met and the Wayuus sued the government in 1994. The court ordered the creation of Sociedad Salinas de Manaure, SAMA based on the original agreement and linked to the then Ministry of Development. The Wayuu would have 25%, but once again the agreements were not met due to legal problems. In 2002 Law 773 of the same year reestablished the creation of the SAMA, distributing earnings among the Ministry of Development (51%) the indigenous Association "Sumain Ichi" (25%) and the municipality of Manaure (25%).
