= Jorge Isaacs Airport =

La Mina Airport Jorge Isaacs Airport
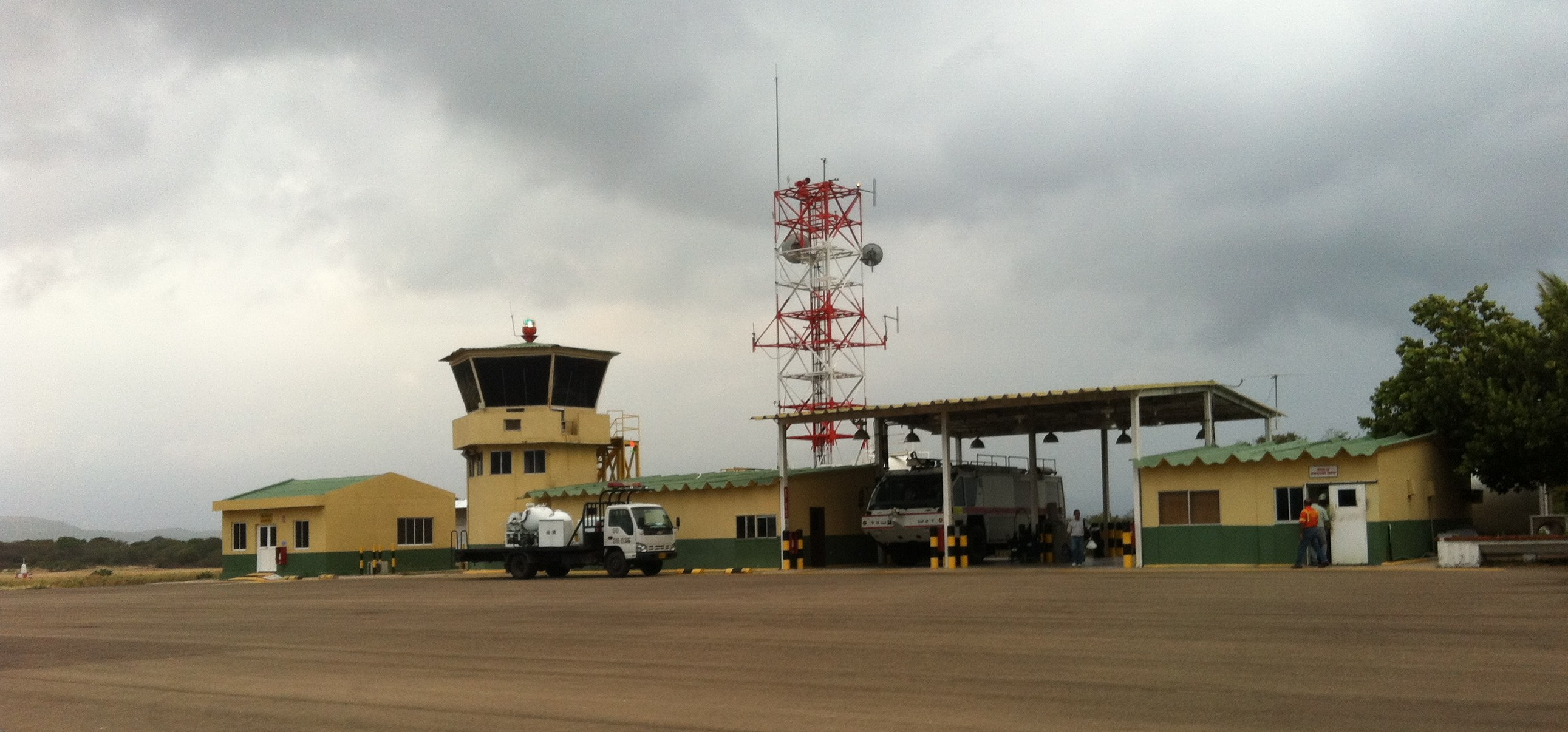
- IATA: MCJ; ICAO: SKLM

Summary
- Airport type: Private
- Owner: Cerrejon LLC.
- Serves: Maicao, Colombia
- Location: Albania
- Elevation AMSL: 276 ft (84 m)
- Coordinates: 11°13′57″N 072°29′20″W

Map
- Location of the airport in Colombia

Runways
Direction	Length		Surface
Direction	m	ft	Surface
10/28	1,700	5,577	Asphalt
- Source: WAD GCM Google Maps

La Mina Airport, or Jorge Isaacs Airport (Spanish: Aeropuerto Jorge Isaacs), (IATA: MCJ, ICAO: SKLM) is an airport serving Maicao, a municipality in the La Guajira Department in Colombia. The airport is 31 kilometres (19 mi) southwest of Maicao.

The Cerrejon VOR-DME (Ident: CJN) is located on the field. The Cerrejon non-directional beacon (Ident: CJN) is located 0.5 nautical miles (0.93 km) off the threshold of Runway 10.

As of May 2018 the airport is not serviced by any airline. SATENA, a regional airline based in the capital city of Bogota suspended all flights to Jorge Isaacs Airport.

== See also ==
- Transport in Colombia
- List of airports in Colombia
