= Maicao =

Maicao Maikau (Wayuu)
- Municipality and City
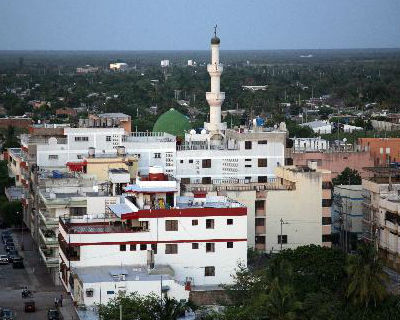

- Flag Coat of arms

- Location of the city and municipality of Maicao in the Department of La Guajira.

- Location in Colombia
- Coordinates: 11°22′40″N 72°14′20″W
- Country: Colombia
- Region: Caribbean
- Department: La Guajira
- Foundation: June 27, 1927

Government
  - Mayor: Mohamad Jaafar Dasuki Hajj

Area
  - Municipality and City: 1,769 km^{2} (683 sq mi)
  - Urban: 21.94 km^{2} (8.47 sq mi)
- Elevation: 52 m (171 ft)

Population (2020 est.)
  - Municipality and City: 185,072
  - Density: 104.6/km^{2} (271.0/sq mi)
  - Urban: 118,889
  - Urban density: 5,419/km^{2} (14,030/sq mi)
- Demonym: Maicaeros
- Time zone: UTC-05:00 (COT)
- Area code: 57 + 5
- Climate: Aw
- Website: Official website (in Spanish)

Maicao (Wayuu: Mai-ka-u) is a city and municipality in La Guajira Department, northern Colombia. It is located 76 km from Riohacha, the capital of the department and is the second largest urban center near the border with Venezuela after the city of Cúcuta.

The city was founded on June 27, 1927 by Colonel Rodolfo Morales and Tomás Curvelo Iguarán, on behalf of the Department of Magdalena in the middle of the Wayuu people's territory. During the 1970s Maicao became a commercial hub due to an oil boom in Venezuela and the flow of contraband present in the Guajira Peninsula.

== Etymology ==
The name of Maicao comes from the Wayuu language mai-ka-u which means "Land of the Maize".

== Geography ==
Maicao is located in the Guajira Peninsula, the northernmost part of South America and on the border of the La Guajira Desert.

The municipality of Maicao borders to the north with the municipalities of Uribia and Manaure; to the east with the Venezuela; to the south with the municipality of Albania and to the west with the municipality of Riohacha covering a total area of 1,782 km^{2} and at altitude over sea level of 52 m.

=== Climate ===
Climate in the municipality of Maicao varies from hot semi-arid (Köppen BSh) in the north to tropical savanna (Aw) in the south. There are typically two rainy seasons and two dry seasons. The average temperature throughout the year ranges from 27 to 29 °C (81 to 84 °F).

Climate data for Maicao (Esc Agr Carraipia), elevation 118 m (387 ft), (1981–2010)
Month	Jan	Feb	Mar	Apr	May	Jun	Jul	Aug	Sep	Oct	Nov	Dec	Year
Mean daily maximum °C (°F)	30.3 (86.5)	31.3 (88.3)	32.3 (90.1)	32.7 (90.9)	32.9 (91.2)	32.9 (91.2)	33.6 (92.5)	34.2 (93.6)	33.0 (91.4)	31.8 (89.2)	30.7 (87.3)	30.0 (86.0)	32.3 (90.1)
Daily mean °C (°F)	25.8 (78.4)	26.1 (79.0)	26.7 (80.1)	27.2 (81.0)	27.7 (81.9)	27.9 (82.2)	28.1 (82.6)	28.2 (82.8)	27.6 (81.7)	27.0 (80.6)	26.5 (79.7)	26.0 (78.8)	27.1 (80.8)
Mean daily minimum °C (°F)	21.5 (70.7)	21.8 (71.2)	22.4 (72.3)	23.0 (73.4)	23.4 (74.1)	23.7 (74.7)	23.7 (74.7)	23.7 (74.7)	23.1 (73.6)	22.5 (72.5)	22.5 (72.5)	21.8 (71.2)	22.8 (73.0)
Average precipitation mm (inches)	19.3 (0.76)	14.9 (0.59)	20.8 (0.82)	72.3 (2.85)	161.1 (6.34)	69.5 (2.74)	42.6 (1.68)	92.8 (3.65)	160.7 (6.33)	214.3 (8.44)	215.4 (8.48)	92.7 (3.65)	1,176.4 (46.31)
Average precipitation days	4	4	3	7	11	6	5	9	13	16	16	9	102
Average relative humidity (%)	79	75	73	74	78	77	75	74	79	83	85	84	78
Mean monthly sunshine hours	223.2	186.3	186.0	144.0	145.7	183.0	217.0	210.8	174.0	176.7	180.0	198.4	2,225.1
Mean daily sunshine hours	7.2	6.6	6.0	4.8	4.7	6.1	7.0	6.8	5.8	5.7	6.0	6.4	6.1
Source: Instituto de Hidrologia Meteorologia y Estudios Ambientales

== History ==
Maicao was inhabited by the Wayuu people prior to the arrival of the Spanish. The Wayuu gave strong resistance to the Spanish conquest, remaining rebellious until the early 20th century. Maicao was officially founded on June 27, 1927 by Colonel Rodolfo Morales and Tomás Curvelo Iguarán, on behalf of the Department of Magdalena in the middle of the Wayuu people territory.

One of the first families to settle in the area were those of José Domingo Boscán and Manuel Palacio López, who settled near the Venezuelan border between the road that connects Riohacha and Maraicaibo, in addition to the fact that this area had relatively fertile land. In 1927, several wells and windmills were built in the area by a German firm. In 1929, the township (Spanish: Corregimiento) of Maicao was created, following population growth. By 1940, Maicao had 500 inhabitants.

The indigenous Wayuu managed contraband trading routes through Maicao arriving from Aruba, Curaçao, Venezuela and other Caribbean Sea territories mostly coffee, alcohol, tobacco and weapons among other taxable articles. During the 1970s Maicao became a commercial hub due to an oil boom in Venezuela and the flow of contraband present in the Guajira peninsula. The commercial boom attracted Arab and other Middle Eastern immigrants most of whom established in Maicao as merchants, establishing another culture in the area.

=== Arab Migration ===
Due to Maicao's proximity to the Venezuelan border, it attracted a number of immigrants to the municipality, in addition to its free port characteristics, and in the 1970's it attracted a number of Arab immigrants from the Levant. In 1989, the Colombo-Arab College Dar el Arkam was created. The migrants settled in the center of Maicao, where one of them, José Abuchaibe of Palestinian origin, built the largest building in the municipality, which is the Hotel Don Juan. In 1997 Middle Eastern immigrants built the Mosque of Omar Ibn Al-Khattab, one of the largest mosques in South America.

=== Colombian armed conflict period ===
The marijuana bonanza in the outskirts of the Sierra Nevada de Santa Marta mountains also introduced another factor to the culture of the region. Marimberos or drug dealers initiated exports of numerous illegal drug trade to the United States and Europe where there was a high demand for drugs. Opulence in certain urban areas became notable, including a Ferraris collection by Lafaurie-González clan (Eduardo, Iván and Fernando Lafaurie-Gonzalez) and their bunker style houses in Maicao and Riohacha.

During the 1980s and 1990s the internal Colombian armed conflict between the government of Colombia and numerous revolutionary groups mainly the Revolutionary Armed Forces of Colombia (FARC) and the National Liberation Army began to affect the municipality of Maicao. Extortions, kidnappings and assassinations became a common practice. The situation worsened due to the deflation of the Venezuelan economy and the trade decrease, as well as crackdowns on contraband by the Colombian government.

In 1991 Maicao was given special customs status in order to spur job growth. The government's intent was to allow raw materials to enter the zone untaxed, have workers there turn them into finished product, and then re-export the finished goods outside Colombia. The law allowed for a certain amount of goods to pass from Maicao into the Colombian interior, but only if they were declared to customs officials and duty was paid on them. Cigarettes however moved outside the Maicao special customs zone "duty not paid" and from there into the black market.

Maicao became subject to royalties coming from the exploitation of coal in the Cerrejon coal mine, however municipal administrations have been subject to widespread corruption and royalties have been temporarily suspended. The culture of avoiding paying taxes has created in numerous occasions tensions between the locals and the government, including burning down the local tax bureau office DIAN in protest for confiscating large amounts of contraband. The municipality also suffered a problem of displaced people due to the internal armed conflict and deficiencies in education and health.

=== Hezbollah ties ===
According to FBI investigators who allegedly told Rio de Janeiro's O Globo in late October 2001 that in addition to the Triborder Region, a focal point of terrorism in South America was Maicao, described as an Islamic community of approximately 4,670 vacation spot for orthodox Islamics and the largest and best organized Islamic community in Colombia with a minority Shiites reportedly more closely associated with the Muslim fundamentalist concept. The report said that there were cells of the radical group Hezbollah and that it controlled up to 70 percent of the local commerce. "The merchants from there make contributions equivalent to 10 percent and even up to 30 percent of their profits. And those responsible for the fund send the money via banks in Maracaibo in Venezuela, and in Panama.

The Department of Administrative Security (Departamento de Seguridad Administrativa―DAS) shut down a clandestine radio station in Maicao on August 15, 1997, for broadcasting Hezbollah propaganda, and a couple of arrests for money laundering, Maicao's Muslim community reportedly has had few contacts with the law. Nevertheless, it is known that the black market for weapons and money laundering in Maicao and neighboring Zulia State in Venezuela is well established.

Hezbollah cells based within Maicao have used drug trafficking and contraband networks to launder funds that were later used to finance terrorist operations worldwide.

=== Modern times ===
On March 19, 2000 the town of Albania segregated some 425 km^{2} from Maicao and became a municipality. The municipality of Maicao lost a large area over the coal mine section decreasing the royalties percentage intended for the region.

== Economy ==
Ninety percent of Maicao's economy depends on commerce and the rest is mainly in the service sector, in addition to a small percentage in the manufacturing industry. According to statistics from the Chamber of Commerce of the Municipality it is estimated that there are 1300 registered commercial stores. In 1992, the Special Customs Regime Zone of Maicao, Uribia and Manaureo was established in 1992 to regulate trade in the area. One of the products grown in Maicao is Ahuyama, better known as Cucurbita moschata, this vegetable is processed into flour from this municipality and marketed in European countries.

== Culture ==
- Mosque of Omar Ibn Al-Khattab, built in September 1997, is the third largest mosque in South America. Although, Colombia is predominantly a Roman Catholic country, the region around Maicao has a large Lebanese Muslim migrant population who funded and built the mosque.

== Transportation ==
The municipality of Maicao had one now closed airstrip, La Majayura Airport, which has been closed, but may reopen. The city is now served by Jorge Isaacs Airport, which is located 40 kilometres (25 mi) in the southwest. It is also still a major transportation hub between Venezuela and Colombia.

Land transportation is served by a two-lane single-road highway, crossing the municipality of Maicao from Rio Hacha towards Venezuela and another from the city of Maicao south towards Valledupar. While much of the trade is legitimate, there is also a great deal of smuggling and contraband.

== Heritage Sites ==
Maicao has several tourist sites such as the Monumento a la Identidad, a sculpture made by Cartagena artist Alfredo Tatis Benzo, this monument is also known as "El Abuelo de las Barbas del Maíz" (lit. 'The Grandfather of the Corn Beards') in reference to how Maicao received its name. In addition there is the Plaza Bolivar of Maicao, it had a statue of Simon Bolivar that collapsed in 2021 from strong breezes, this statue had remained for more than 34 years in the square. In May 2022, a new statue was put up again, this time by the artist of the municipality, Vespaciano Ruiz Pichón. Another religious site in the municipality is the San José Church, which is the patron saint of the municipality.

== Nature Reserves ==
Maicao along the municipality of Albania has the Montes de Oca Natural Reserve, the reserve is in the township of Carraipía, south of Maicao.. This protected area has at least 14400 hectares, and is the source of water for part of the population of Maicao. According to the Autonomous Regional Corporation of La Guajira (Spanish: Corporación Autónoma Regional de La Guajira) there are approximately 200 types of plants and 177 species of birds, Montes de Oca contain endangered forest species such as Guayacán.
