= La Jagua del Pilar =

Coordinates: 10°31′N 73°05′W

- Municipality and town
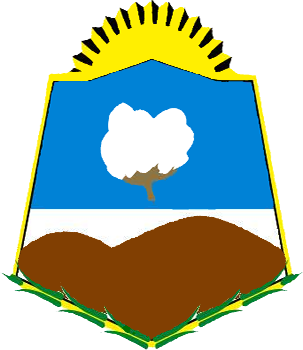
- Flag Coat of arms

- Location of the municipality and town of La Jagua del Pilar in the department of La Guajira.
- Country: Colombia
- Region: Caribbean
- Department: La Guajira

Government
  - Mayor: José Augusto Manjarrez Mendoza (2012-2015)

Population (2018)
  - Total: 2,721
- Time zone: UTC-5
- Website: http://www.lajaguadelpilar-laguajira.gov.co/

La Jagua del Pilar (Spanish pronunciation: [la ˈxaɣwa ðel piˈlaɾ]), literally "The Jagua of the Pillar", is a town and municipality in the Colombian Department of La Guajira. The municipality has a total area of 187 km² and located some 450 meters over sea level and with an average temperature of 27 °C. La Jagua del Pilar became a municipality of La Guajira in 1998.

== Geography ==
The municipality of La Jagua del Pilar is located in the southern area of the Guajira Peninsula limiting to the north with the municipality of Urumita; east with the Bolivarian Republic of Venezuela and to the south and west with the Department of Cesar covering a total area of 152 km². The area of the municipality is mostly flat with some mountains near the Serranía del Perijá mountain range and crossed by the Perija and Marquezote rivers and the Los Martires stream, among others. The municipality seat is located some 450 m above sea level.

=== Climate ===
The average temperature in the municipality is 28 °C throughout the year, presenting two rainy season and two dry seasons. Climate also varies depending on mountain altitude.

== History ==
The area of the present-day municipality of La Jagua del Pilar was populated by indigenous peoples pertaining to the Wayuu and Wiwas ethnic groups. During the period of Independence from Spain the area was a farm owned by María de la Concepción Loperena Ustariz, from Valledupar, one of the few women who supported the independence movement of Simón Bolívar. Loperena donated more than a hundred horses to the Patriot army. She also donated her state to build a new settlement which was named "La Jagua del Pedregal". The new settlement was established by Don Manuel José Fernández de Castro and Don Bartolo Ustariz on October 12, 1795. The name was later changed to La jagua del Pilar to honor Virgin Mary, Our Lady of the Pillar.

On May 6, 1998, the corregimiento of La Jagua del Pilar became a municipality, segregating from the municipality of Urumita by ordinance 018 of the same year declared by the Department Assembly of La Guajira and is covered also by Law 14 of 1969 also known as the "Frontiers Law" for having boundaries with Venezuela.

== Economy ==
The economy is based primarily on agriculture. Cattle ranching is practiced mostly extensively and in latifundios. The main agricultural products are cotton, maize, plantain and yuca.

== Culture ==
La Jagua del Pilar venerates the "Virgen del Carmen" (Virgin of Carmen) a local Roman Catholic tradition on July 16 of each year. Every October 12 of each year the municipality also celebrates the Our Lady of the Pillar along the Vela del Marquezote festival.
