= Bahia Portete (La Guajira, Colombia) =

Coastal bay in La Guajira, Colombia

Bahía de Portete
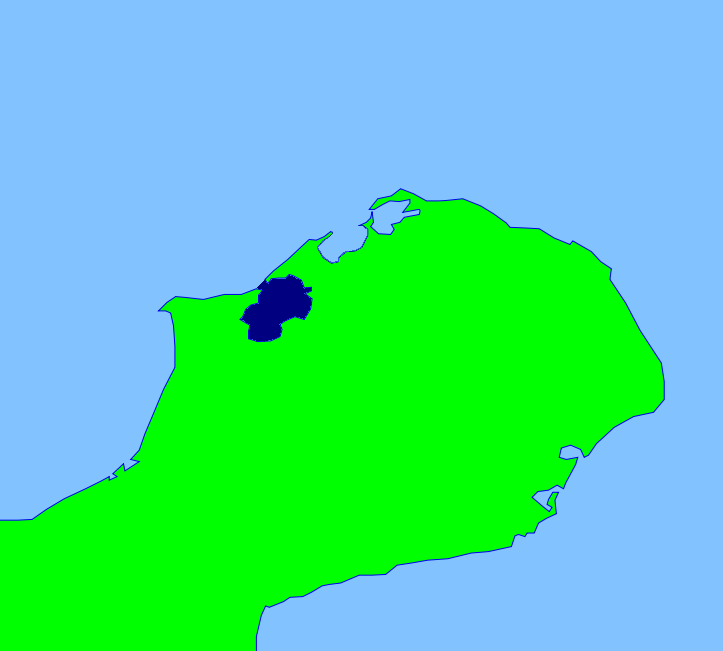

- Location within Colombia
- Location: La Guajira, Colombia
- Coordinates: 12°11.515′N 71°55.25′W
- Ocean/sea sources: Caribbean Sea
- Basin countries: Colombia

Bahía de Portete (Bahia Portete) is a bay in La Guajira, Colombia. It lies approximately 30 miles (48 km) from the Venezuelan border on the Guajira Peninsula in the northeast region of Colombia. The bay opens to the Caribbean Sea. A large coal terminal lies at the mouth of the bay, and the bay's inlet is less than 1 mile (2 km) wide.

The Puerto Bolivar Airport is the closest airport to the bay.
