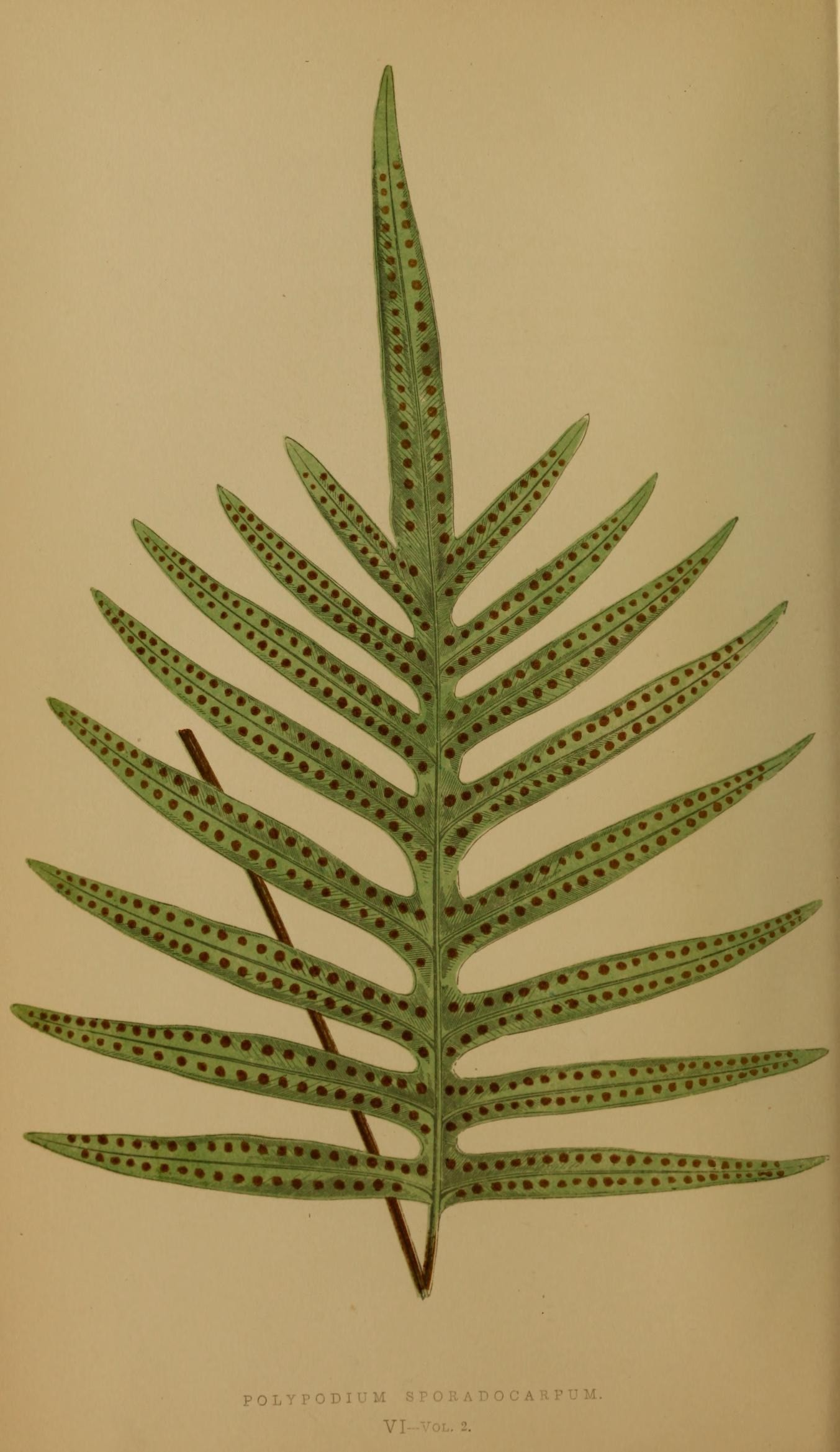

Scientific classification
- Kingdom: Plantae
- Clade: Embryophytes
- Clade: Tracheophytes
- Division: Polypodiophyta
- Class: Polypodiopsida
- Order: Polypodiales
- Suborder: Polypodiineae
- Family: Polypodiaceae
- Genus: Phlebodium
- Species: P. areolatum

Binomial name
- Phlebodium areolatum (Willd.) J.Sm.

Synonyms
- List: Chrysopteris araneosa Fourn.; Chrysopteris areolata Fée; Chrysopteris glauca Fée; Chrysopteris glaucina Fourn.; Chrysopteris lanosa Fée; Chrysopteris sporadocarpa Link; Chrysopteris trilobata Fée; Drynaria araneosa Fée; Drynaria fulva Fée; Drynaria glaucina Fée; Goniophlebium areolatum C.Presl; Phlebodium araneosum (M.Martens & Galeotti) Mickel & Beitel; Phlebodium aureum var. araneosum (M.Martens & Galeotti) L.D.Gómez; Phlebodium aureum var. areolatum Farw.; Phlebodium aureum var. trilobatum Farw.; Phlebodium fulvum T.Moore; Phlebodium lanosum T.Moore; Phlebodium pseudoaureum (Cav.) Lellinger; Phlebodium sporadocarpum J.Sm.; Pleopeltis araneosa T.Moore; Pleopeltis areolata C.Presl; Pleopeltis glaucina T.Moore; Polypodium araneosum M.Martens & Galeotti; Polypodium areolatum Willd.; Polypodium areolatum var. loreum J.Bommer; Polypodium aureum var. araneosum Brause; Polypodium aureum var. areolatum (Humb. & Bonpl. ex Willd.) Baker; Polypodium aureum subsp. pseudoaureum (Cav.) C.Chr.; Polypodium aureum var. reductum Jenman; Polypodium drynarioides Griseb.; Polypodium fulvum M.Martens & Galeotti; Polypodium glaucinum M.Martens & Galeotti; Polypodium pseudoaureum Cav.; Polypodium sporadocarpum Willd.

= Phlebodium areolatum =

Species of fern

Phlebodium areolatum, the Virginia blue fern, is a species of epiphytic fern in the family Polypodiaceae. It is native to the New World Tropics and Subtropics; Mexico, Florida, some of the Caribbean islands, Central America, and South America to Argentina, and has been introduced to India. As its synonym Phlebodium pseudoaureum it has gained the Royal Horticultural Society's Award of Garden Merit.
