= Phlebodium decumanum =

Scientific classification
- Kingdom: Plantae
- Clade: Embryophytes
- Clade: Tracheophytes
- Division: Polypodiophyta
- Class: Polypodiopsida
- Order: Polypodiales
- Suborder: Polypodiineae
- Family: Polypodiaceae
- Genus: Phlebodium
- Species: P. decumanum

Binomial name
- Phlebodium decumanum (Willd.) J.Sm.

Species of fern

Phlebodium decumanum is a species of fern in the family Polypodiaceae native to Mexico and Tropical America. Calaguala is an extract from the fern that has been used as cancer and psoriasis treatment.
