= Calaguala =

Calaguala is an extract from Phlebodium decumanum (syn. Polypodium decumanum), a type of fern used historically for medicinal purposes such as cancer treatment, and more recently as treatment for psoriasis.

It is also known as kalawalla, and a number of other spellings occur.

== See also ==
- Phlebodium aureum
- Callawalla (disambiguation)
