= Callawalla =

Callawalla may refer to:

- Kallawaya people, an indigenous people of Bolivia
- Kallawaya language, a language spoken by the Kallawaya people
