= Puerto Bolívar Airport =

Puerto Bolívar Airport Aeropuerto Puerto Bolívar
- IATA: none; ICAO: SKPB

Summary
- Airport type: Private
- Operator: Aerocivil
- Location: Uribia, Colombia
- Elevation AMSL: 90 ft / 27 m
- Coordinates: 12°13′18″N 71°59′05″W

Map
- Location of the airport in Colombia

Runways
Direction	Length		Surface
Direction	m	ft	Surface
09/27	1,594	5,230	Asphalt
- Source: WAD GCM Google Maps

Puerto Bolívar Airport (Spanish: Aeropuerto Puerto Bolívar) (ICAO: SKPB) is a private airport in the Guajira Department of Colombia. The closest city is Uribia. It is located next to the Cerrejón coal terminal and only serves the workers of the area. Only private sector aircraft and Colombia's Aerocivil land at Puerto Bolivar. No commercial airlines serve the airport and it is mostly empty.

The Puerto Bolivar non-directional beacon (Ident: PBL) is located 1.3 nautical miles (2.4 km) off the approach end of Runway 09. The Portete non-directional beacon (Ident: PTE) is located 0.8 nautical miles (1.5 km) off the approach end of Runway 27.

== See also ==
- Transport in Colombia
- List of airports in Colombia
