= Uribia, La Guajira =

Coordinates: 11°55′N 72°00′W

Uribia
- Municipality and city
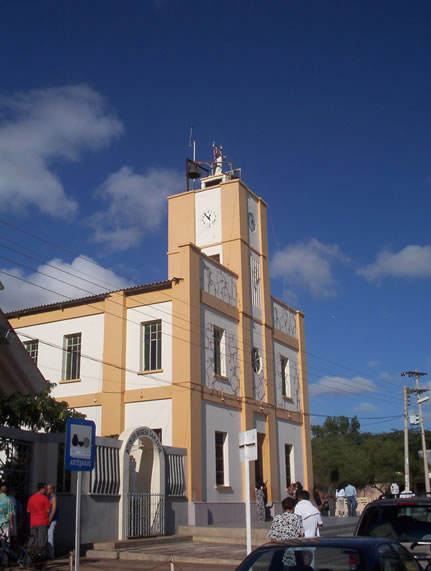
- Church in downtown Uribia.

- Flag Coat of arms
- Motto: Capital Indigena de Colombia (Indigenous capital of Colombia)
- Location of the city and municipality of Uribia in the Department of La Guajira.
- Country: Colombia
- Region: Caribbean
- Department: La Guajira
- Foundation: March 1, 1935

Government
  - Mayor: Jaime Luis Buitrago García (L)

Area
  - Total: 8,200 km^{2} (3,200 sq mi)

Population (2019 est.)
  - Total: 198,890
  - Density: 24/km^{2} (63/sq mi)
- Time zone: UTC-5

Uribia is a small city and municipality of the La Guajira department of Colombia. It is the youngest municipality of this Department since the year 2000. Northern Zone of the Cerrejón coal mines are located in this municipality. The municipality also contains the Serranía de Macuira mountain range which is an isolated low altitude mountain range in the middle of La Guajira Desert. One third of this mountain range is also a National Natural Park of Colombia.

== Geography and climate ==
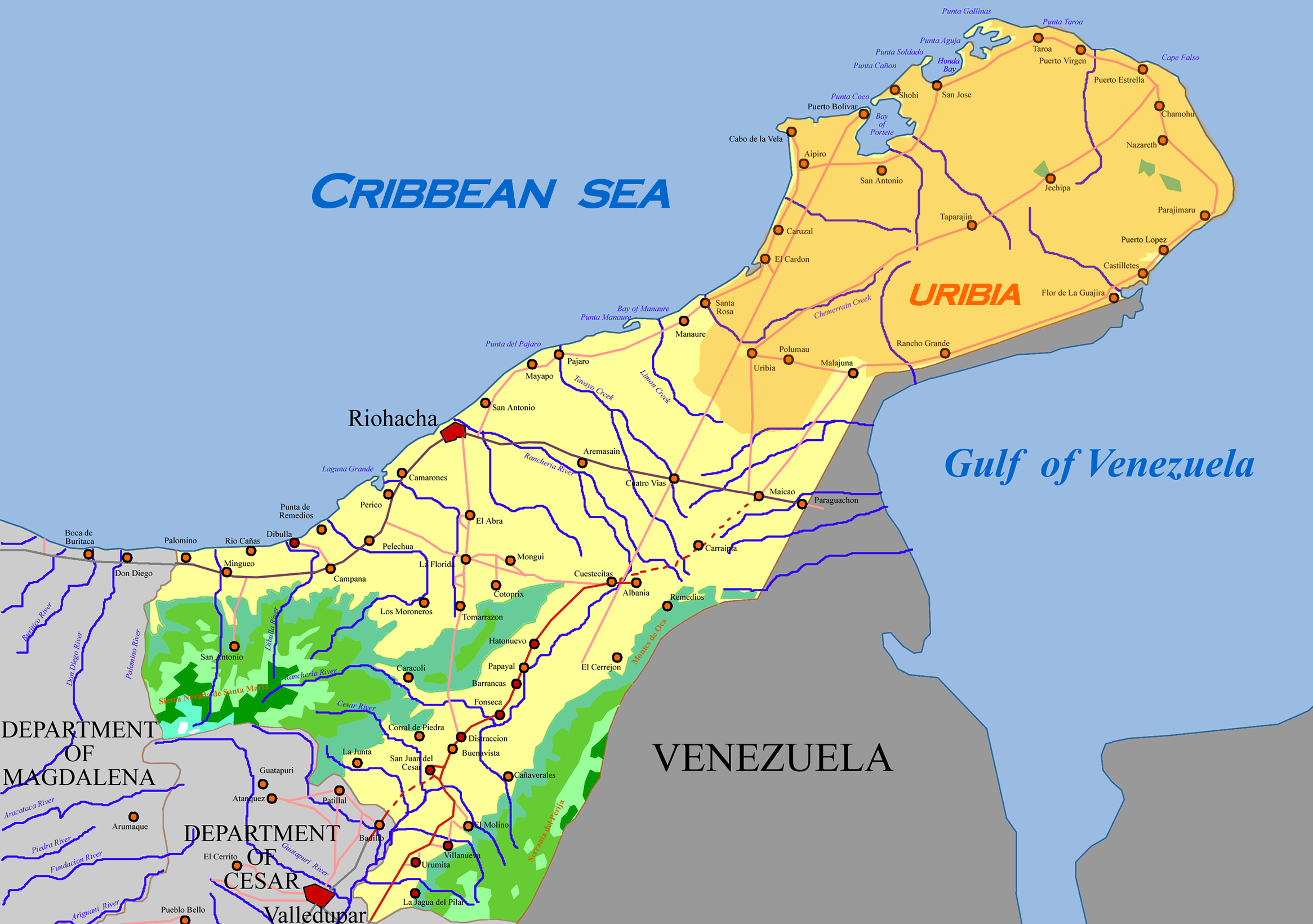
The municipality of Uribia within La Guajira including main roads and villages.

The Municipality of Uribia covers most of the northern area of the Guajira Peninsula, the northernmost part of South America. Uribia borders to the north and west with the Caribbean Sea which surround more than half the municipality; to the east Uribia has a short border with the Bolivarian Republic of Venezuela; to the south its borders the municipality of Maicao and southwest the municipality of Riohacha.

The Upper Guajira is arid, presenting clay formations with scarce vegetation of cactus and other xerophiles. The Serranía de Macuira lies in the middle of the upper region presenting three predominant hills 650 metres (2,130 ft) or more above sea level in the Macuira, Jarará and La Teta.

Uribia has an arid climate (Köppen BWh) owing to its extremely hot temperatures that average around 30 °C (86 °F) on most days of the year. Rainfall averages around 360 millimetres (14 in) per year but even in the “wet” months of May, September, October and November it does not reach the level of potential evaporation. Humidity is generally high enough to make the consistent heat very uncomfortable.

Climate data for Urbia (Nazreth), elevation 85 m (279 ft), (1981–2010)
Month	Jan	Feb	Mar	Apr	May	Jun	Jul	Aug	Sep	Oct	Nov	Dec	Year
Mean daily maximum °C (°F)	30.3 (86.5)	31.0 (87.8)	31.3 (88.3)	31.6 (88.9)	32.1 (89.8)	32.5 (90.5)	32.8 (91.0)	33.5 (92.3)	33.4 (92.1)	32.4 (90.3)	31.0 (87.8)	30.2 (86.4)	31.9 (89.4)
Daily mean °C (°F)	25.7 (78.3)	25.8 (78.4)	26.3 (79.3)	26.9 (80.4)	27.5 (81.5)	27.9 (82.2)	27.8 (82.0)	28.3 (82.9)	28.4 (83.1)	27.8 (82.0)	27.1 (80.8)	26.1 (79.0)	27.1 (80.8)
Mean daily minimum °C (°F)	23.4 (74.1)	23.2 (73.8)	23.6 (74.5)	24.5 (76.1)	25.1 (77.2)	25.5 (77.9)	25.1 (77.2)	24.1 (75.4)	25.3 (77.5)	24.6 (76.3)	24.4 (75.9)	23.5 (74.3)	24.4 (75.9)
Average precipitation mm (inches)	20.7 (0.81)	11.3 (0.44)	10.5 (0.41)	23.7 (0.93)	44.3 (1.74)	14.2 (0.56)	6.5 (0.26)	17.8 (0.70)	46.0 (1.81)	154.5 (6.08)	153.5 (6.04)	70.6 (2.78)	573.6 (22.58)
Average precipitation days	5	3	3	2	3	2	1	2	5	12	14	10	59
Average relative humidity (%)	82	81	81	82	81	80	80	80	81	84	85	84	82
Mean monthly sunshine hours	220.1	194.8	204.6	165.0	173.6	210.0	244.9	244.9	204.0	182.9	186.0	189.1	2,419.9
Mean daily sunshine hours	7.1	6.9	6.6	5.5	5.6	7.0	7.9	7.9	6.8	5.9	6.2	6.1	6.6
Source: Instituto de Hidrologia Meteorologia y Estudios Ambientales

Climate data for Uribia (Pto Bolivar), elevation 10 m (33 ft), (1981–2010)
Month	Jan	Feb	Mar	Apr	May	Jun	Jul	Aug	Sep	Oct	Nov	Dec	Year
Mean daily maximum °C (°F)	31.4 (88.5)	31.6 (88.9)	32.2 (90.0)	32.9 (91.2)	33.6 (92.5)	34.3 (93.7)	34.3 (93.7)	34.5 (94.1)	33.8 (92.8)	32.9 (91.2)	32.1 (89.8)	31.5 (88.7)	32.9 (91.2)
Daily mean °C (°F)	27.0 (80.6)	27.0 (80.6)	27.4 (81.3)	28.1 (82.6)	29.0 (84.2)	29.5 (85.1)	29.3 (84.7)	29.5 (85.1)	29.3 (84.7)	28.8 (83.8)	28.3 (82.9)	27.5 (81.5)	28.4 (83.1)
Mean daily minimum °C (°F)	24.6 (76.3)	24.5 (76.1)	24.9 (76.8)	25.6 (78.1)	26.3 (79.3)	26.8 (80.2)	26.6 (79.9)	26.9 (80.4)	26.9 (80.4)	26.1 (79.0)	26.0 (78.8)	25.2 (77.4)	25.8 (78.4)
Average precipitation mm (inches)	4.8 (0.19)	1.5 (0.06)	2.6 (0.10)	6.9 (0.27)	27.3 (1.07)	8.2 (0.32)	11.0 (0.43)	29.3 (1.15)	60.2 (2.37)	95.2 (3.75)	53.5 (2.11)	30.3 (1.19)	326.3 (12.85)
Average precipitation days	2	1	1	2	3	2	2	4	7	10	7	5	43
Average relative humidity (%)	75	73	73	74	75	72	71	73	75	78	77	76	75
Mean monthly sunshine hours	279.0	256.9	269.7	243.0	244.9	240.0	275.9	282.1	237.0	223.2	228.0	260.4	3,040.1
Mean daily sunshine hours	9.0	9.1	8.7	8.1	7.9	8.0	8.9	9.1	7.9	7.2	7.6	8.4	8.3
Source: Instituto de Hidrologia Meteorologia y Estudios Ambientales

Climate data for Uribia (Rancho Grande), elevation 50 m (160 ft), (1981–2010)
Month	Jan	Feb	Mar	Apr	May	Jun	Jul	Aug	Sep	Oct	Nov	Dec	Year
Mean daily maximum °C (°F)	31.9 (89.4)	32.3 (90.1)	32.9 (91.2)	33.5 (92.3)	33.8 (92.8)	34.3 (93.7)	34.5 (94.1)	34.6 (94.3)	33.7 (92.7)	32.4 (90.3)	32.3 (90.1)	32.0 (89.6)	33.2 (91.8)
Daily mean °C (°F)	27.8 (82.0)	27.8 (82.0)	28.3 (82.9)	29.0 (84.2)	29.4 (84.9)	29.8 (85.6)	29.9 (85.8)	30.1 (86.2)	29.7 (85.5)	29.0 (84.2)	28.7 (83.7)	28.1 (82.6)	29.0 (84.2)
Mean daily minimum °C (°F)	24.1 (75.4)	24.1 (75.4)	24.5 (76.1)	25.4 (77.7)	26.0 (78.8)	26.4 (79.5)	26.2 (79.2)	26.4 (79.5)	26.3 (79.3)	25.8 (78.4)	25.6 (78.1)	24.8 (76.6)	25.5 (77.9)
Average precipitation mm (inches)	6.9 (0.27)	4.3 (0.17)	1.2 (0.05)	9.3 (0.37)	34.7 (1.37)	10.4 (0.41)	7.2 (0.28)	28.9 (1.14)	72.4 (2.85)	96.0 (3.78)	56.6 (2.23)	19.8 (0.78)	347.4 (13.68)
Average precipitation days	1	1	0	1	3	1	1	3	7	8	6	3	36
Average relative humidity (%)	67	66	65	66	68	66	65	66	69	72	71	69	68
Mean monthly sunshine hours	275.9	242.8	257.3	213.0	220.1	237.0	263.5	263.5	225.0	213.9	219.0	248.0	2,879
Mean daily sunshine hours	8.9	8.6	8.3	7.1	7.1	7.9	8.5	8.5	7.5	6.9	7.3	8.0	7.9
Source: Instituto de Hidrologia Meteorologia y Estudios Ambientales

== History ==
=== Evangelization ===
The process of evangelizations of the Wayuu people restarted in 1887 with the return of the Capuchin friars under reverend friar José María de Valdeviejas. In 1905, Pope Pius X created the Vicariate of La Guajira and as first Vicar, friar Atanasio Vicente Soler y Royo in an attempt to "civilize" the Wayuu people.

The friars the created the orphanages for Wayuu children beginning with the La Sierrita orphanage built in the Sierra Nevada de Santa Marta mountains in 1903; followed by the San Antonio orphanage in 1910 located by the Calancala River, Nazareth orphanage in the Serrania de Macuira mountains in 1913 creating a direct influence over the Rancherías of Guarrachal, El Pájaro, Carazúa, Guaraguao, Murumana, Garra patamana and Karraipía. While Nazareth had some control over the rancherías of Taroa, Maguaipa, Guaseipá and Alpanapause. The friars constantly visited the settlements inviting to attend mass. Wayuu children in the orphanage were educated with traditional European customs. Conflicts between the Wayuu people and the Colombian government decreased since then. In 1942 the village of Uribia celebrated for the first time Christmas and New Year's Eve.

=== Official foundation ===
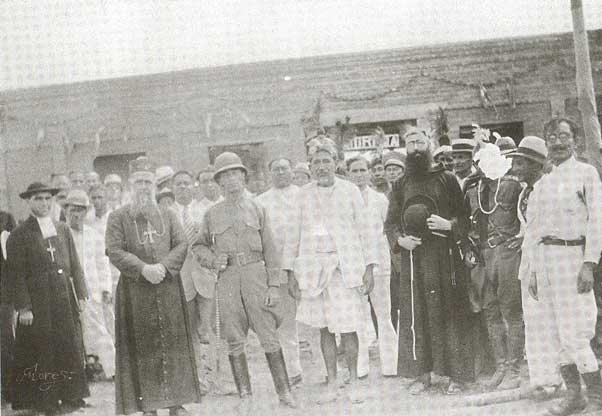
Captain Eduardo Londoño and Cacique Bartola González founded Uribia, with the presence of the Capuchin friars. (1935)

Uribia was founded officially on March 1, 1935 by Captain Eduardo Londoño Villegas in honor of Colombian Liberal Party leader Rafael Uribe Uribe, prior to this the village was named Chitki in Wayuu language. The main plaza was created and named after Francisco de Paula Santander one of the leaders of the Colombian independence from Spain.

=== Capital of the Special Commissary of La Guajira ===
Uribia became a regional capital town of the Special Commissary of La Guajira until 1954, when the National Intendency of La Guajira was created and the capital transferred to Riohacha.

== Culture ==
Uribia is predominantly inhabited by indigenous peoples pertaining to the Wayuu ethnic group. Cultural activities are directly related to them. The city celebrates the "Festival of the Wayuu Culture" from May 31 to June 1 every year.

== Transportation ==
- Puerto Bolívar Airport

== Gallery ==
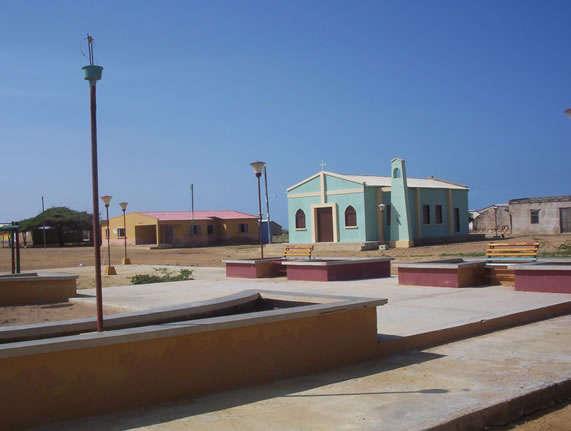
Puerto Estrella in the municipality of Uribia

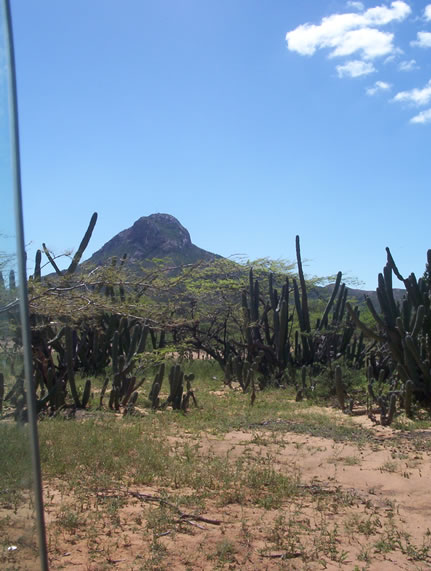
Cerro La Teta, northern municipality of Uribia - Guajira Desert
