= La Guajira Department =

Department of Colombia

La Guajira Department Departamento de La Guajira (Spanish) Mma'ipakat Wajiira (Wayuu)
- Department
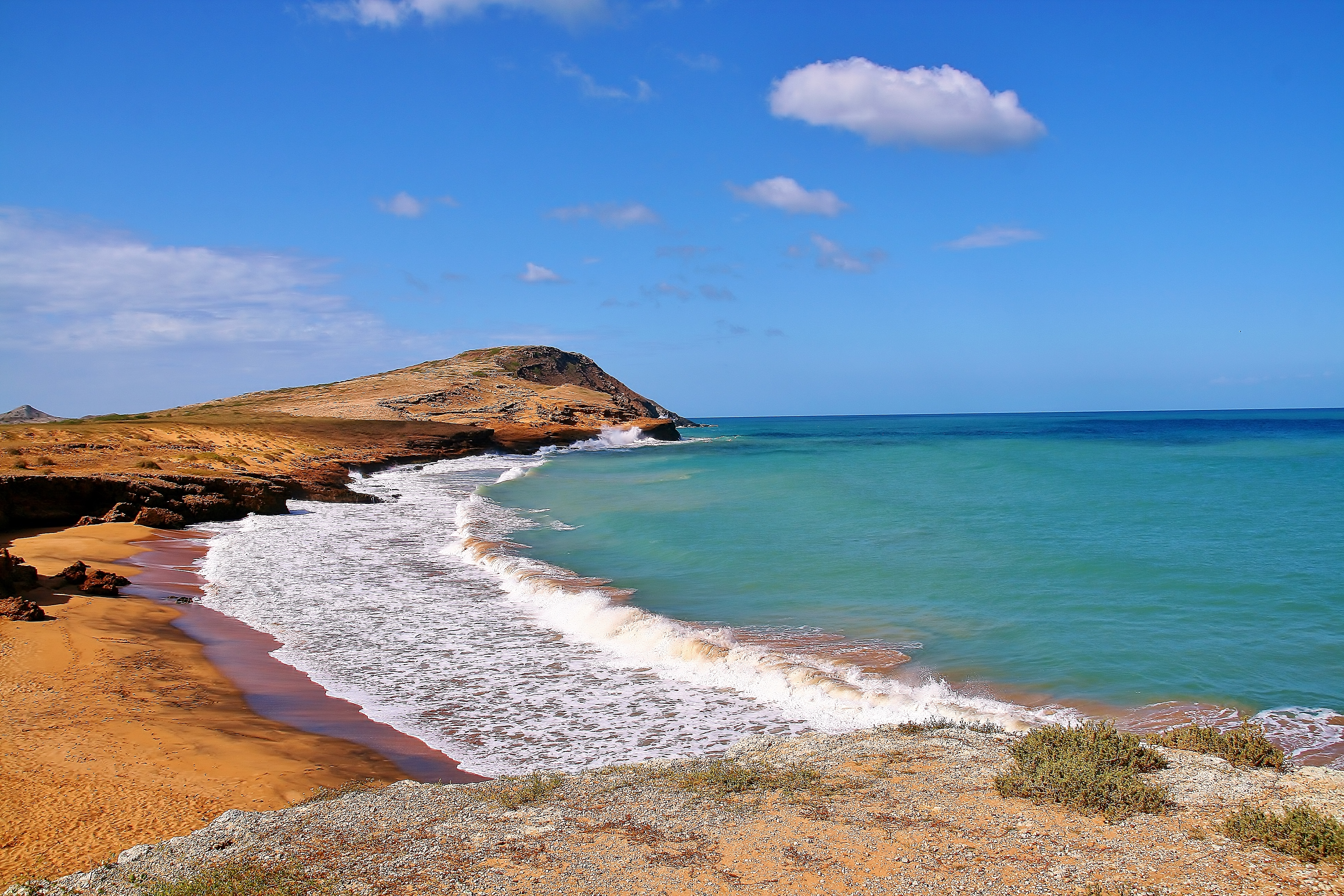
- The Cabo de la Vela

- Flag Coat of arms
- Anthem: Himno de La Guajira.
- La Guajira shown in red

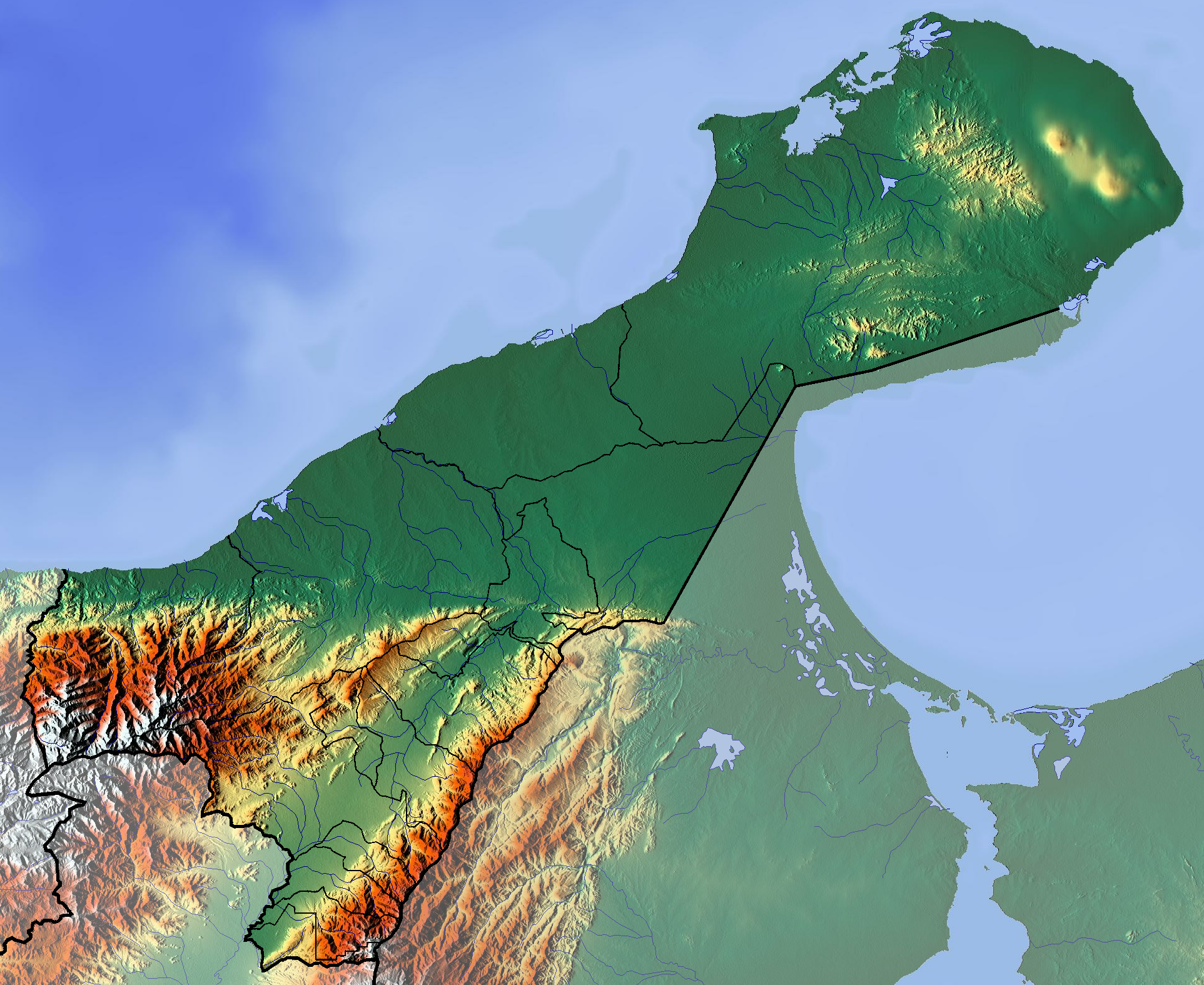
- Topography of the department
- Coordinates: 11°33′N 72°54′W
- Country: Colombia
- Region: Caribbean Region
- Established: July 1, 1965
- Capital: Riohacha

Government
  - Governor: Jairo Aguilar (2024-2027) (Radical Change)

Area
  - Total: 20,848 km^{2} (8,049 sq mi)
  - Rank: 25th

Population (2018)
  - Total: 880,560
  - Rank: 20th
  - Density: 42.237/km^{2} (109.39/sq mi)

GDP
  - Total: COP 22,263 billion (US$ 5.2 billion)
- Time zone: UTC-05
- ISO 3166 code: CO-LAG
- Municipalities: 15
- HDI: 0.720 high · 30th of 33
- Website: www.laguajira.gov.co/

La Guajira (Spanish pronunciation: [la ɣwaˈxiɾa] (Note: In isolation, they are pronounced [la] and [gwaˈxiɾa] respectively.)) is a department of Colombia. It occupies most of the Guajira Peninsula in the northeast region of the country, on the Caribbean Sea and bordering Venezuela, at the northernmost tip of South America. The capital city of the department is Riohacha.

Various indigenous tribes have populated the arid plains of the region long before the Spanish expeditions reached the Americas. In 1498, Alonso de Ojeda sailed around the peninsula of La Guajira, but the first European to set foot in what is known today as La Guajira was the Spanish explorer Juan de la Cosa in 1499. During the colonial era, the territory of La Guajira was disputed by the governors of Santa Marta and Venezuela, owing to deposits of pearls. English pirates, Frenchmen, and Germans also fought for control of the territory.

Martin Fernandez de Enciso founded Nuestra Señora Santa María de los Remedios del Cabo de la Vela, the first colonial village in the territory. In 1535, Nicolás de Federmán refounded the settlement as the village of Riohacha, as a result of constant attacks by the Wayuu people. In 1544, it was moved to the site of the present-day city. In 1871, the region was separated from the Department of Magdalena, and La Guajira became a national territory in its own right. The Intendance of La Guajira was created in 1898.

In 1911, the Colombian government created the Commissary of la Guajira. In the 1930s, numerous immigrants came to the area from the Middle East (Christian Arabs, Maronites in particular, and Shi'i Muslims) from Lebanon, Syria, Palestine and Jordan. They generally settled in the city of Maicao. In 1954, the Intendance of la Guajira was created again and Riohacha was declared a municipality. Finally, in 1964, the Department of La Guajira was created.

The economy of the department depends on royalties from the coal mining at Cerrejón (producing 24.9 million tons of export coal in 2004), natural gas exploitation, and salt mines. A popular ecotourist destination is Cabo de la Vela, a small fishing village located on the headland of the peninsula in the Guajira desert.

== Etymology ==
The name Guajira comes from the Cariban languages; it is the Spanish pronunciation of Wajiira or Wahiira. According to Picon, the word Guajiros was first used in the year 1600 to designate some 200 indigenous families inhabiting the region of Riohacha. They were known for having large herds of goats. The Spanish applied the term to all the indigenous in the peninsula who were goat herders. According to Oliver, the term Guajiro did not appear on Spanish records until the year 1626, in a document by a friar named Pedro Simón.

== Geography ==
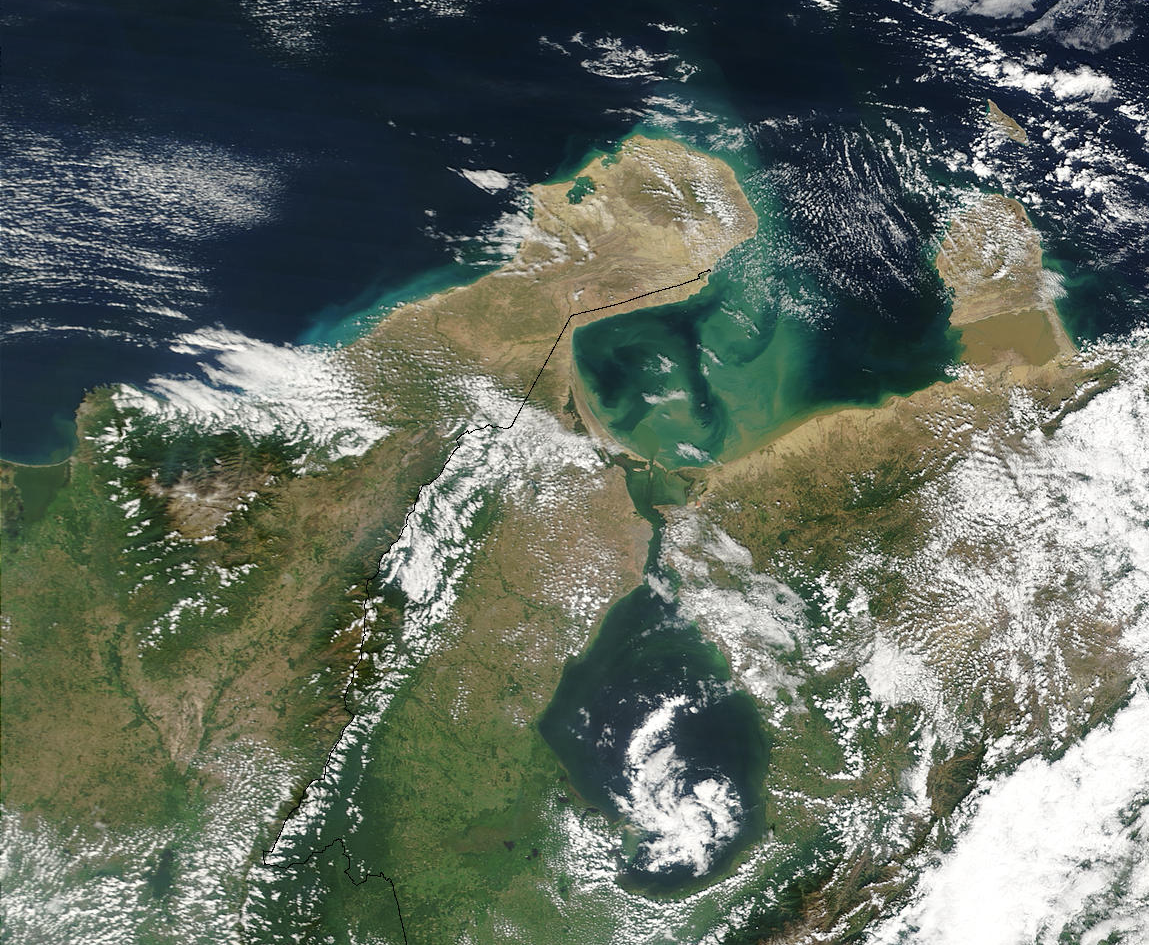
The Guajira peninsula

The northern part of the department consists of arid plains called the Guajira-Barranquilla xeric scrub, whose dryness is caused by the rain shadow of the Sierra Nevada de Santa Marta. These mountains rise to 5,775 metres (18,947 ft) in the south. The Sinú Valley dry forests lie in between. In the far south are the headwaters of the Cesar River, which flow south towards the Magdalena River.

The Ranchería River, which also rises in the Sierra Nevada de Santa Marta, crosses the Guajira Peninsula from south to north and flows through the Valley of Upar and into the Caribbean Sea. The Serranía del Perijá and the Montes de Oca lie in the southeastern part of the department, bordering Venezuela.

The department was divided into three subregions based on geographical characteristics: Upper, Middle, and Southern Guajira. The Upper Guajira covers the northernmost part of the peninsula, with mostly scarce semi-desertic vegetation. It has only an isolated, low-altitude mountain range, the Serranía de Macuira (865 m above sea level). The Middle Guajira region is mostly flat, with hills in some areas, presenting also an arid environment. The Southern Guajira covers the region of the Montes de Oca and the Serranía del Perijá mountain ranges on the border with Venezuela, and the valley formed with the Sierra Nevada de Santa Marta mountain range. Southern Guajira has more green vegetation, wetlands and rivers.

=== Ecoregions ===
The Department of La Guajira is within the Colombian Caribbean region, one of the five natural regions of Colombia.

==== Serranía de Macuira ====
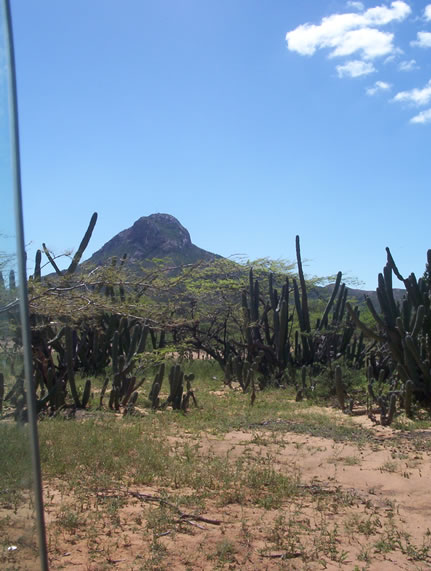
La Teta hill, located in the municipality of Uribia, northern Guajira

The Serranía de Macuira mountain range is located to the northwest of the Guajira Peninsula occupying an area of 35,000 hectares (86,000 acres), 25,000 ha (62,000 acres) of which are contained within the Macuira National Park. The mountain range is an isolated ecosystem in the middle of the La Guajira Desert, near the Caribbean Sea, between the villages of Nazareth, Ichipa and Tawara. The mountain range works as a barrier to humid trade winds, which blow from the northeast.

==== Sierra Nevada de Santa Marta ====
The Sierra Nevada de Santa Marta mountain range is located on the Caribbean Sea and is shared with the departments of Magdalena and Cesar. Most of the hydrographic reserves in the Department of La Guajira originate in this mountain range, including the Ranchería River which flows through most of the department from south to north. The Sierra Nevada de Santa Marta was declared by UNESCO as a Biosphere Reserve.

==== Cerro Pintao ====
The Cerro Pintao ("Painted Hill")—on the slopes of which sit the municipalities of San Juan del Cesar, El Molino, Villanueva, and Urumita and, in the Department of Cesar, the municipalities of Manaure, La Paz, San Diego, and Codazzi—covers an area of 25,000 hectares (62,000 acres), with altitudes ranging from 1,600 to 3,688 metres (5,249 to 12,100 ft), forming a Páramo ecosystem, and gives birth to some 13 rivers of Colombia.

==== Flamingos Fauna and Flora Sanctuary ====
The Santuario de Flora y Fauna los Flamencos (Flamingos Fauna and Flora Sanctuary) is located on the coastline of the municipality of Riohacha, between the village of Camarones and the Tapias River, and covers 7,000 hectares (17,000 acres) The sanctuary has four lagoons (Manzanillo, Navío Quebrado, Tocoromanes, and Laguna Grande) and numerous streams which serve as habitat for the flamingos and numerous other endemic species.

==== Flamingos Protection Area ====
Located in the village of Musichi, the Flamingos Protection Area is within the municipality of Manaure and contains numerous lagoons that are used by locals for the artisanal making of salt.

=== Climate ===
Climate data for Riohacha
Month	Jan	Feb	Mar	Apr	May	Jun	Jul	Aug	Sep	Oct	Nov	Dec	Year
Record high °C (°F)	39.2 (102.6)	36.7 (98.1)	39.8 (103.6)	38.4 (101.1)	38.0 (100.4)	38.6 (101.5)	38.1 (100.6)	38.8 (101.8)	39.4 (102.9)	36.6 (97.9)	35.8 (96.4)	38.6 (101.5)	39.8 (103.6)
Mean daily maximum °C (°F)	32.4 (90.3)	32.5 (90.5)	32.5 (90.5)	32.6 (90.7)	33.2 (91.8)	34.2 (93.6)	34.8 (94.6)	34.8 (94.6)	33.4 (92.1)	32.4 (90.3)	32.1 (89.8)	32.3 (90.1)	33.1 (91.6)
Mean daily minimum °C (°F)	21.8 (71.2)	21.9 (71.4)	22.9 (73.2)	24.2 (75.6)	24.8 (76.6)	25.3 (77.5)	25.2 (77.4)	25.0 (77.0)	24.4 (75.9)	23.7 (74.7)	23.3 (73.9)	22.5 (72.5)	23.8 (74.7)
Record low °C (°F)	17.2 (63.0)	17.0 (62.6)	17.0 (62.6)	17.2 (63.0)	20.8 (69.4)	20.0 (68.0)	17.2 (63.0)	19.8 (67.6)	19.2 (66.6)	20.0 (68.0)	18.8 (65.8)	16.8 (62.2)	16.8 (62.2)
Average rainfall mm (inches)	0.5 (0.02)	0.8 (0.03)	2.6 (0.10)	25.8 (1.02)	75.5 (2.97)	37.1 (1.46)	16.2 (0.64)	52.3 (2.06)	115.9 (4.56)	142.8 (5.62)	59.2 (2.33)	17.3 (0.68)	546 (21.49)
Average rainy days	1	1	1	3	7	3	2	5	9	10	5	2	49
Average relative humidity (%)	70	70	71	74	75	68	66	71	76	79	79	74	73
Mean monthly sunshine hours	259.3	229.8	235.4	195.0	193.5	230.3	249.4	236.5	198.1	211.7	217.5	238.2	2,694.7
Source: INSTITUTO DE HIDROLOGIA METEOROLOGIA Y ESTUDIOS AMBIENTALES

== History ==
=== Pre-Columbian ===
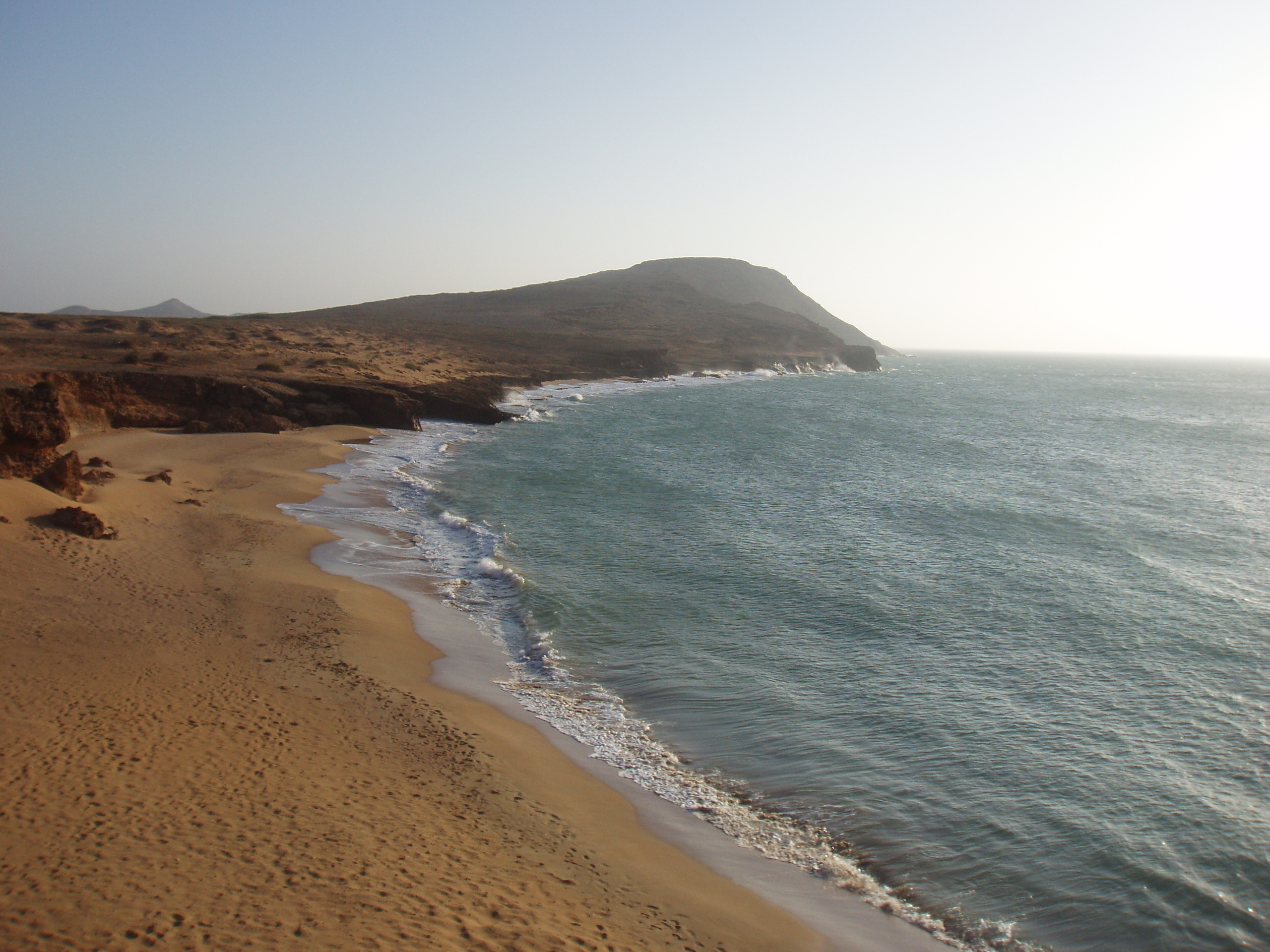
The Cabo de la Vela was one of the first sites that Spanish explorers first sighted upon their arrival to the continental Americas.

During the pre-Columbian era, present-day La Guajira was inhabited predominantly by indigenous tribes belonging, in the dry northern lowlands, mostly to the Wayuu (Guajiros, Macuiros, Anates, Caquetios, Wayunaiki, Cuanaos, Onotos and Eneales) and Cocina people, and, in the south, to the Kogui, Arhuaco, Guanebucan, and Chimila ethnic groups, among others. Archaeological digs have uncovered the sites of fishing communities that used pottery on the central eastern side of the Guajira Peninsula, dating to the 10th century BC.

These groups coexisted on the Guajira Peninsula. The northern indigenous peoples were nomads traveling the peninsula, hunting, fishing, and collecting fruit. The indigenous groups in the south were semi-sedentary, practicing agriculture and exploiting coastal resources.

=== Spanish conquest and colonization ===
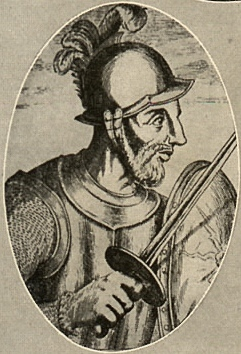
Alonso de Ojeda.

In 1498, the Guajira Peninsula was first seen by Spanish explorers led by Alonso de Ojeda, who sailed the coast, but didn't land. In 1502, a Spanish expedition led by Juan de la Cosa was the first to disembark at Cabo de la Vela.

In 1524, Rodrigo de Bastidas created the government of Santa Marta which encompassed an area from Cabo de la Vela to the mouth of the Magdalena River.

In 1535, Martín Fernández de Enciso founded the first settlement in La Guajira, a village, near present-day Cabo de la Vela, called Nuestra Señora Santa María de los Remedios del Cabo de la Vela. In 1544, due to constant attacks from the indigenous, and from Spanish from the neighboring Captaincy of Venezuela who were after the large deposits of pearls, the village was moved to present-day Riohacha and refounded by Nikolaus Federmann.

Between 1609 and 1640, the Spanish colonizers imported some 800 or more African slaves. Most of these later escaped and formed palenques. In 1679, the Government of Santa Marta offered these palenques their freedom in exchange for their helping to protect the territory from English pirates and the government of Venezuela who coveted the Guajira Peninsula because of its pearls.

La Guajira was one of the territories in Colombia that endured a period of isolation during the Spanish colonization of the Americas, due to the resistance of the indigenous peoples, predominantly the Wayuu. It was not until the 18th century that the Spanish monarchy ordered the complete conquest of the region, and the conflict between colonizers and indigenous prevailed throughout the 19th century.

==== The Guajira rebellion ====
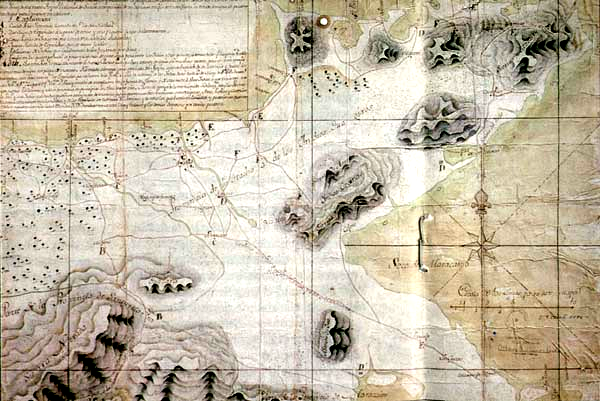
Map of La Guajira in 1769

The Wayuu were never subjugated by the Spanish, and the two groups were in a more or less permanent state of war. There were rebellions in 1701 (when the Wayuu destroyed a Capuchin mission), 1727 (when more than 2,000 Indians attacked the Spanish), 1741, 1757, 1761, and 1768. In 1718, Governor Soto de Herrera called the Wayuu, "barbarians, horse thieves, worthy of death, without God, without law and without a king". Of all the Indians in the territory of Colombia, they were unique in having learned the use of firearms and horses.

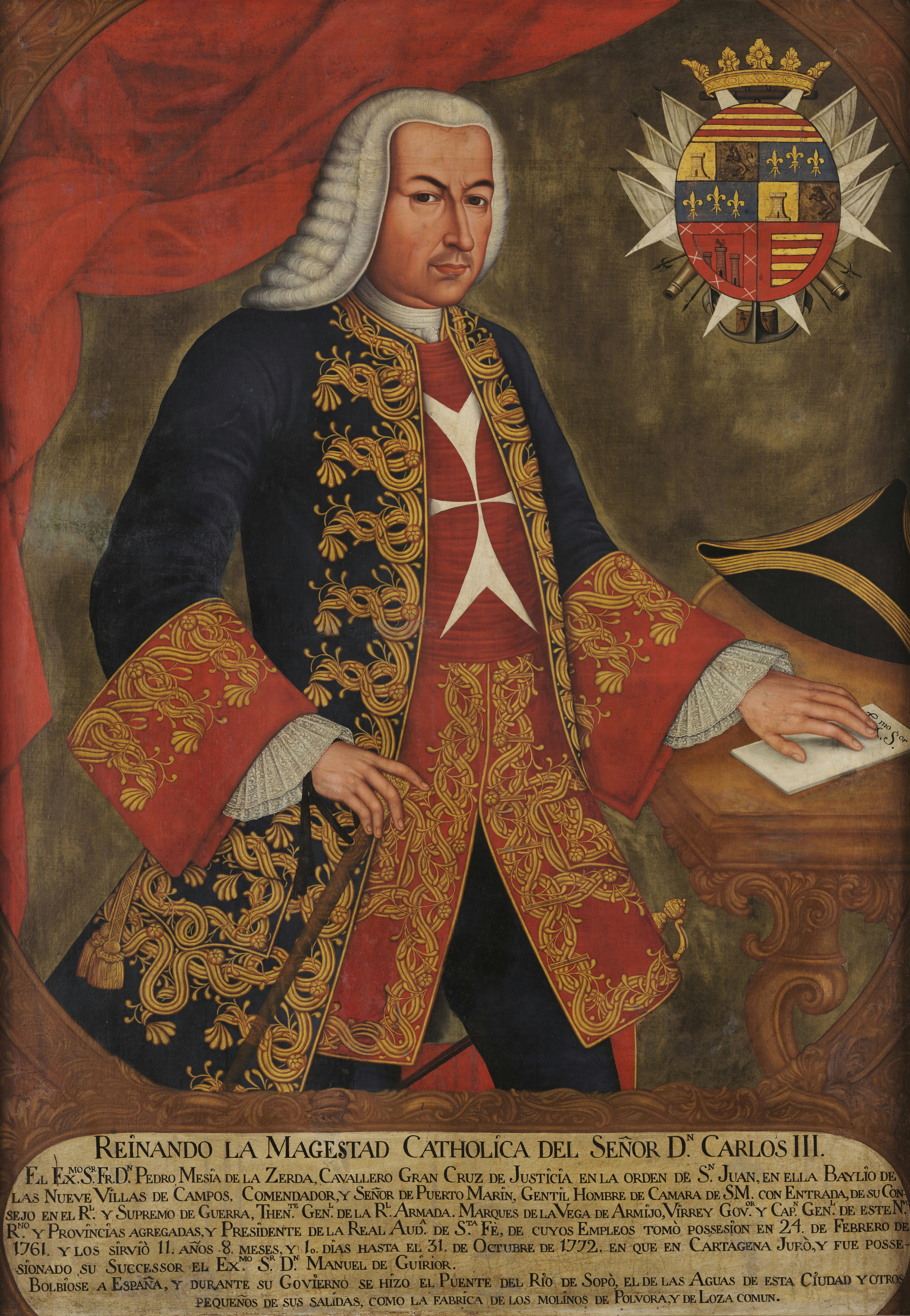
Pedro Messía de la Cerda, Viceroy of the Viceroyalty of New Granada.

In 1769, the Spanish took 22 Wayuu captive, in order to put them to work building the fortifications of Cartagena. The reaction of their fellow Indians was unexpected. On May 2, 1769, at El Rincón, near Río de la Hacha, they set the village afire, burning the church and two Spaniards who had taken refuge in it, and capturing the priest. The Spanish immediately dispatched an expedition from El Rincón to capture the Indians. At the head of this force was José Antonio de Sierra, a mestizo who had also headed the party that had taken the 22 Guajiro captives. The Guajiros recognized him and forced his party to take refuge in the house of the curate, which they then set afire. Sierra and eight of his men were killed.

This success was soon known in other Guajiro areas, and more men joined the revolt. According to Messía, at its peak there were 20,000 Indians under arms. Many had firearms acquired from English and Dutch smugglers, sometimes even from the Spanish. These enabled the rebels to capture nearly all the settlements of the region, which they burned. According to the authorities, more than 100 Spaniards were killed and many others taken prisoner. Many cattle were also taken by the rebels. The Spaniards who could took refuge in Río de la Hacha and sent urgent messages to Maracaibo, Valle de Upar, Santa Marta, and Cartagena. Cartagena sent 100 troops. The rebels themselves were not unified. Sierra's relatives among the Indians took up arms against the rebels to avenge his death, a battle between them being fought at La Soledad. That and the arrival of the Spanish reinforcements quelled the rebellion, but not before the Guajiro had regained much territory.

=== Republican era ===
In 1846, the new government of the Republic of New Granada created the "Guajiro territory", from part of the State of Magdalena, but the indigenous traded in contraband on a large scale, problems with the authorities continued, and the territory was once again put under the government of Santa Marta.

In 1871, once again the territory of La Guajira was put under separate administration and became a national territory. La Guajira became an intendencia in 1898 and a commissary in 1911. In 1954, it was demoted back to intendencia, until 1964, when the Department of La Guajira was created.

==== The Evangelization of the indigenous peoples ====
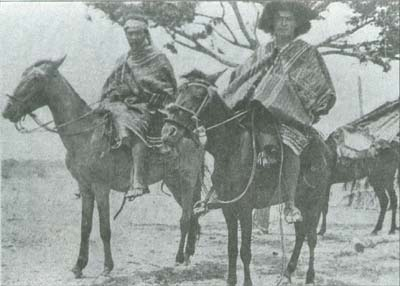
Wayuu riding on horses, 1928

The process of evangelizing the Wayuu people restarted in 1887 with the return of the Capuchin friars under reverend friar José María de Valdeviejas. In 1905, Pope Pius X created the Vicariate of La Guajira and, as the first vicar, Friar Atanasio Vicente Soler y Royo attempted to "civilize" the Wayuu people.

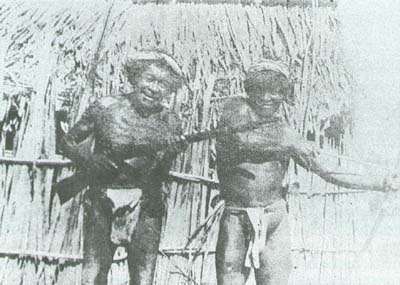
Wayuus carrying a rifle and traditional bow and arrow. 1928.

In 1903, the Capuchin Friars began building orphanages for Wayuu children, beginning with the La Sierrita Orphanage built in the Sierra Nevada de Santa Marta mountains. The San Antonio Orphanage, located by the Calancala River, was built in 1910, and the Nazareth Orphanage, in the Serranía de Macuira mountains, in 1913. The orphanages had influence over the rancherías of Guarrachal, El Pájaro, Carazúa, Guaraguao, Murumana, Garra Patamana, and Karraipía. The Nazareth Orphanage had some control over the rancherías of Taroa, Maguaipa, Guaseipá, and Alpanapause. The friars frequently visited the settlements, inviting the people to attend mass. Wayuu children in the orphanages were educated in traditional European customs. Conflicts between the Wayuu people and the Colombian government have decreased since then. In 1942, Uribia celebrated Christmas and New Year's Eve for the first time .

==== Thousand days' civil war ====
During the Thousand Days' War (1899–1902) the region was affected by the struggle between liberals and conservatives. The indigenous in La Guajira sided with members of either side depending on parental affiliation or economic advantage rather than on political views. A cacique named José Dolores came to an agreement with Liberal radical Rafael Uribe Uribe, but later sided with the conservatives after recognizing a parental affiliation with General Iguarán, one of the conservative commanders.

== Politics ==
The Department of La Guajira is governed by regional equivalents of the three branches of the national government of Colombia. The executive branch is represented by the Governor of the Department of La Guajira, elected every four years by popular vote in regional elections; the legislative branch by the Department Assembly of La Guajira; and the judicial branch by the regional courts under the Superior Tribunal of Riohacha whose members are appointed by the Supreme Court of Colombia. Control institutions also have their regional representatives. These institutions have control over the 15 municipalities which are governed locally by a mayor, a town council and by the regional courts and control institutions.

=== Administrative divisions ===
The Department of La Guajira is formed into 15 municipalities, each administered by a popularly elected mayor and a city council, as well as municipal-level courts. 12 of the municipalities are part of a government program called "Special Units for Frontier and Department Frontier Zone": San Juan del Cesar, La Jagua del Pilar, Barrancas, El Molino, Fonseca, Hatonuevo, Maicao, Uribia, Urumita, Villanueva, Manaure, and Riohacha. The municipalities of Dibulla, Albania, and Distracción are excluded from that classification. The Department of La Guajira is also composed of 126 corregimientos (local magistracies), 49 inspecciones de policía (police districts) and 10 caseríos (villages), distributed throughout the municipalities.

==== Municipalities ====
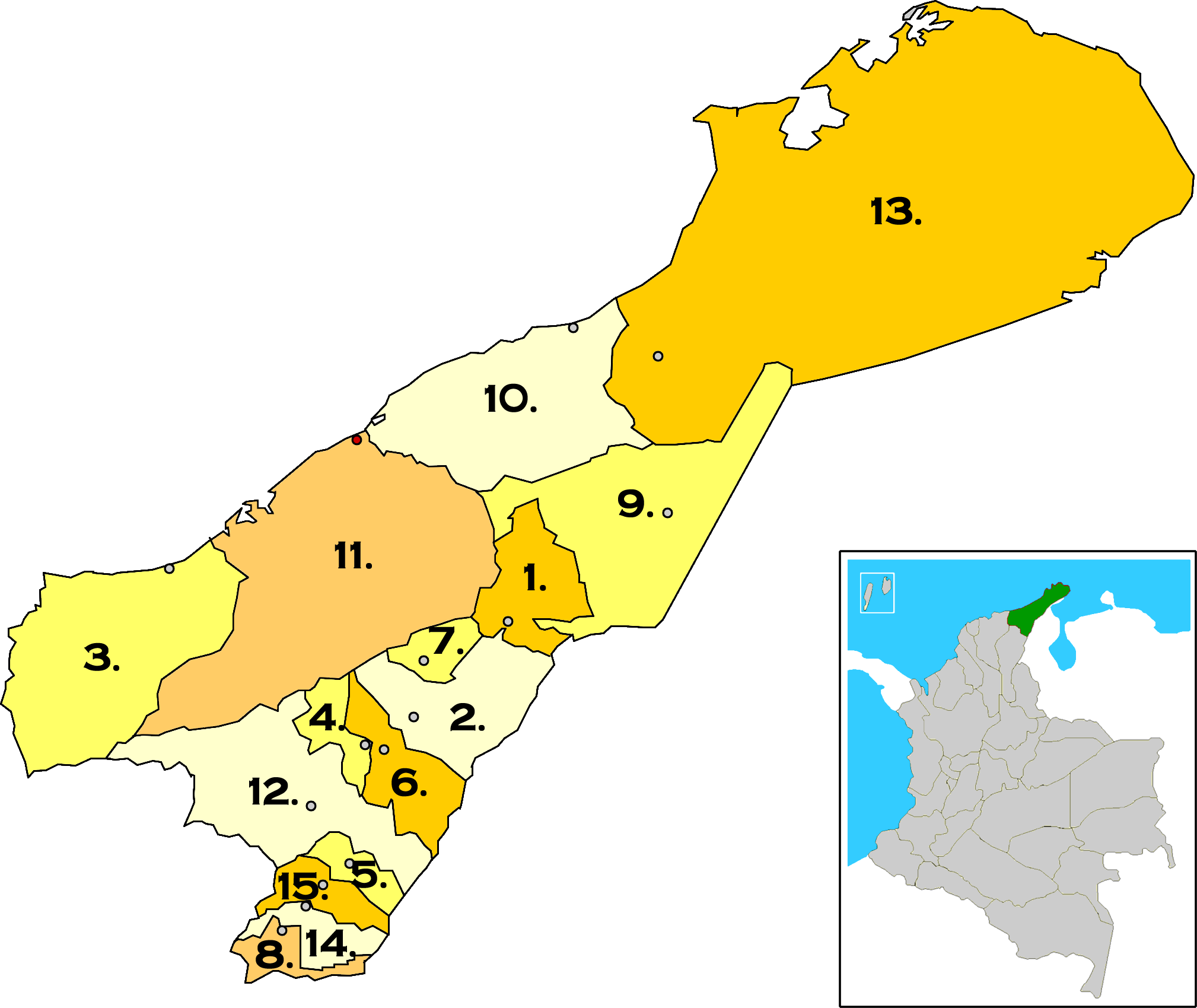
Municipalities of La Guajira Department. Municipality and city of Riohacha highlighted in dark gray and red respectively.

1. Albania
2. Barrancas
3. Dibulla
4. Distracción
5. El Molino
6. Fonseca
7. Hatonuevo
8. La Jagua del Pilar
9. Maicao
10. Manaure
11. Riohacha
12. San Juan del Cesar
13. Uribia
14. Urumita
15. Villanueva

=== Defense ===
The Colombian National Police have a regional command post in the Department of La Guajira, usually under the command of a colonel and based in the capital of the department, Riohacha. The Colombian National Army has two units in the department, both of which are part of the 1st Division: the 2nd Mechanized Cavalry Battalion (based in Distracción) and the 6th Mechanized Battalion (Based in Riohacha). The Colombian Air Force division Comando Aéreo de Combate No. 3 (CACOM-3), in Barranquilla, Atlántico, serves the Department of La Guajira, using as its airstrip the Almirante Padilla Airport.

== Demographics ==
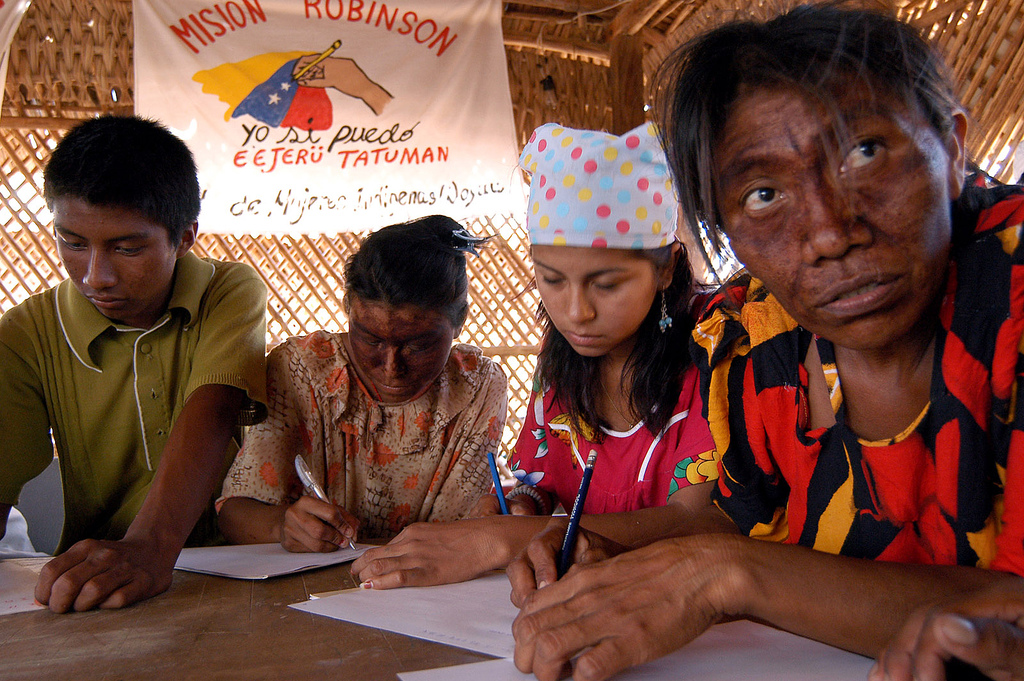
Members of the Wayuu ethnic group in Venezuela. Wayuus are nomads and travel between Colombia and Venezuela from time to time, usually during rainy seasons.

Historical population
Year	Pop.	±%
1973	181,771	—
1985	299,995	+65.0%
1993	433,361	+44.5%
2005	681,575	+57.3%
2018	880,560	+29.2%

According to the DANE (Colombian statistics bureau) 2005 Census, 44.9% of the population of the Department of La Guajira was indigenous, mostly belonging to the Arhuaco, Koguis, Wiwa, and Wayuu tribes. 7.5% was of Afro-Colombian descent; while the remaining 47.6% of the population did not consider itself part of a particular ethnic group, except for Middle Eastern descendants, who have migrated here throughout the 20th century.

The department's indigenous population was the largest of any Colombian department (followed by the departments of Cauca and Narino with 18% and 11.2% respectively) and was 20.2% of the national total of indigenous people. The municipalities with the largest indigenous populations were those where the Wayuu people had settled: Uribia (95.9%), Manaure (88.2%), and Maicao (40.1%).

The population of 623,250 constituted 1.5% of the total population of Colombia (42,090,502) and 7% of the Caribbean Region of Colombia (8,910,195). The Department of La Guajira had a population density of 29.9 inhabitants per square kilometer. From those 623,250 total inhabitants, 50.6% were females and 49.4% were males.

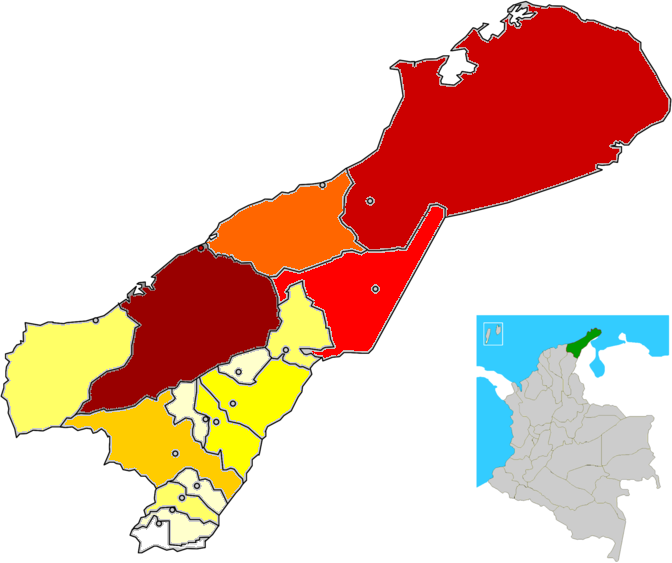
Map of La Guajira by population

Municipality	Population	Percentage
Riohacha	169,311	27.2%
Uribia	116,674	18.7%
Maicao	103,124	16.5%
Manaure	68,578	11%
San Juan del Cesar	25,587	4.1%
Fonseca	22,220	3.6%
Barrancas	22,207	3.6%
Dibulla	21,098	3.4%
Albania	20,898	3.4%
Villanueva	18,804	3%
Hatonuevo	9,797	1.6%
Urumita	8,545	1.4%
Distraccion	8,274	1.3%
El Molino	5,937	1%
La Jagua del Pilar	2,196	0.4%
TOTAL (2005)	623,250	100%

== Education ==
The University of La Guajira has its main campus at Riohacha, with satellite campuses at Fonseca, Maicao, Manaure, Albania, and Villanueva. The institution offers technical as well as undergraduate and graduate programs in natural sciences, engineering, economics, education, administration, and the humanities.

== Economy ==
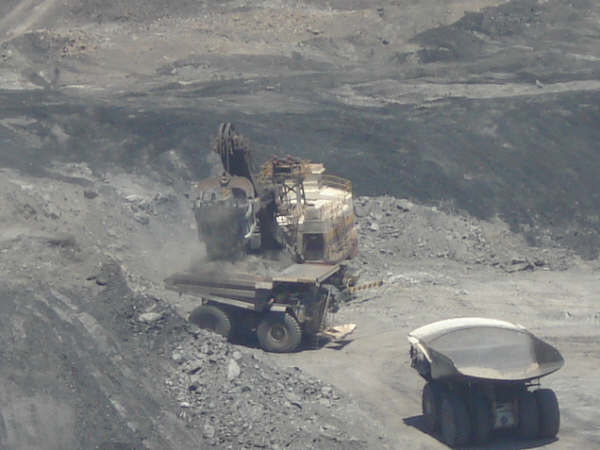
Trucks loaded with coal at the Cerrejón coal mine.

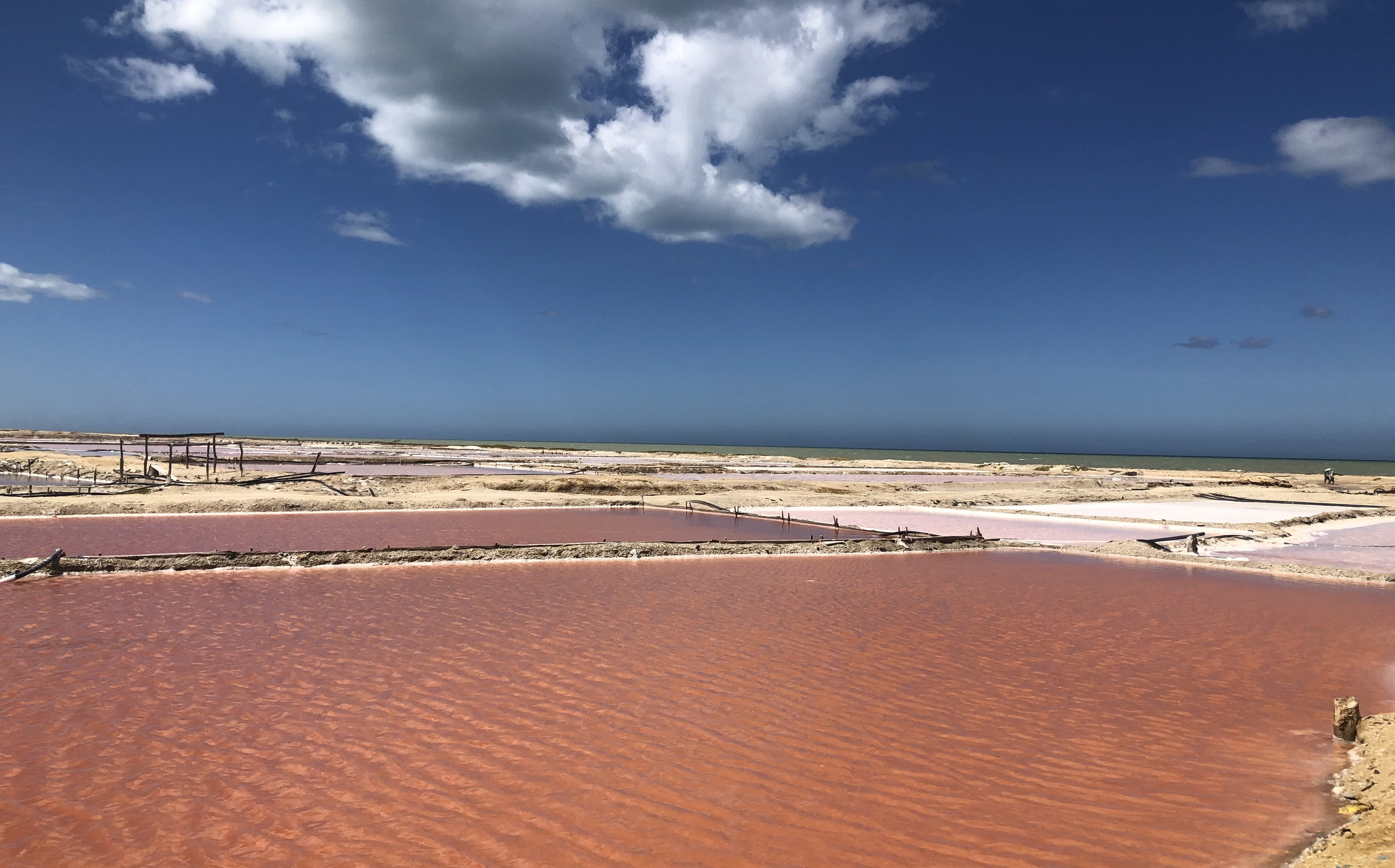
Manaure salt evaporation pond. Manaure provides approximately 80% of the Colombian market with salt.

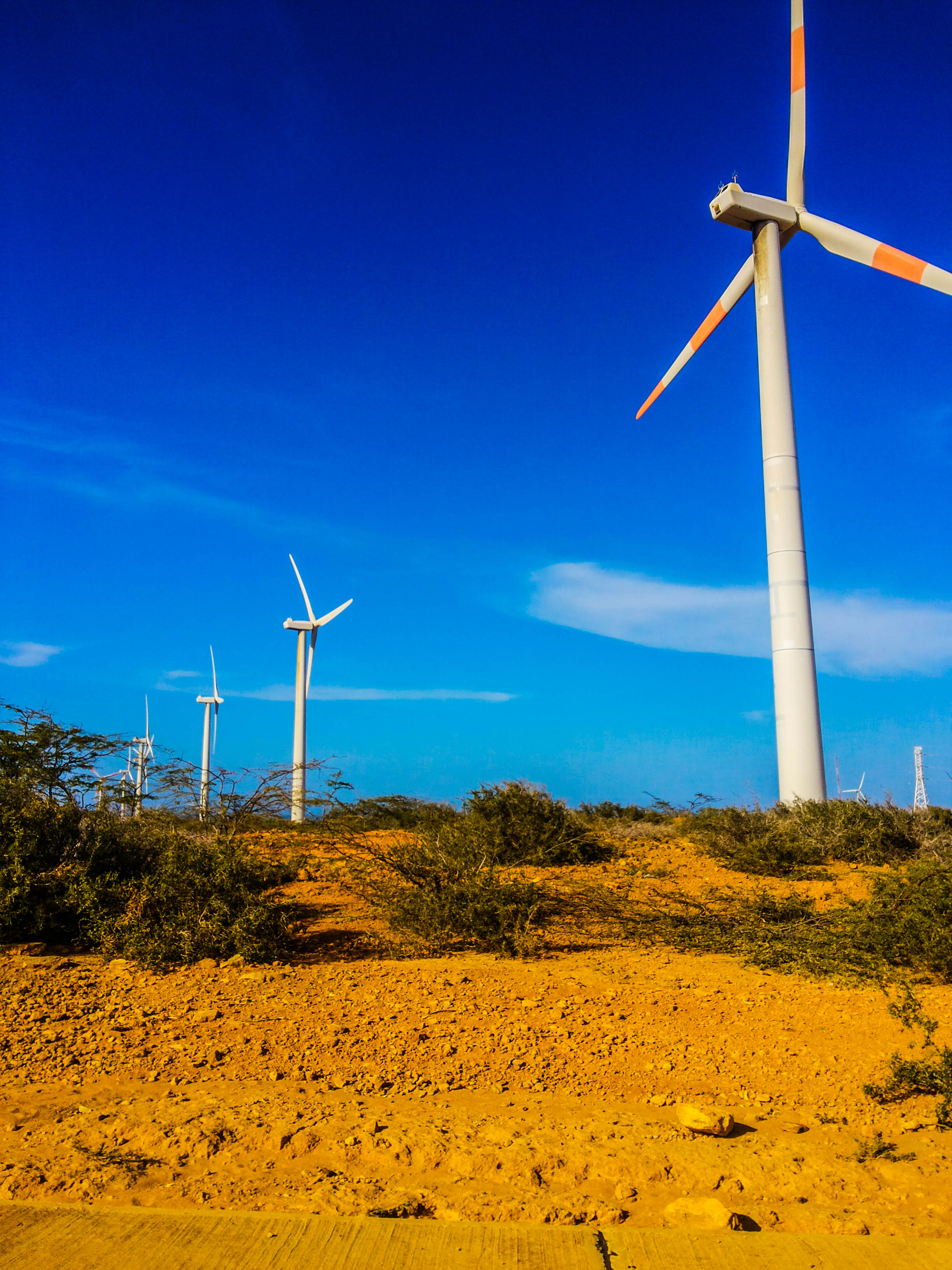
Jepírachi wind farm in the Guajira Peninsula.

The economy of the Department of La Guajira is based on the exploitation of mineral resources, such as coal in the Cerrejón mines, natural gas, salt mines in Manaure, and constituted 53.48% of total revenues in 2005.

The service industry follows, including electricity, gas, potable water, transport and communications, accounting for 11.06% of the total revenue. Education, health, community service and domestic services account for 9.60% of the total.

Agriculture, silviculture, and fishing account for 7.99% of the total, followed by commerce, hotel and restaurant industries which together account for 6.65% of the total revenues. Public administration accounts for 5.47%, construction 3.01%, real estate 2.21%, and industrial 0.52%.

=== Agriculture ===
The Department of La Guajira in 2005 produced mainly tobacco, coffee, yuca, plantain, coconuts, ñame, arracacha, oil palm, and sugar cane. 1,211 plantations were transitory while 59,830 plantations were in permanent production.

== Culture ==
Cultural aspects in the Department of La Guajira have been mostly influenced by the traditions of the Wayuu; by European culture, mainly through Roman Catholic traditions; by Afro-Colombian culture; and since the mid-20th Century, by Middle Eastern culture, including Islamic traditions. There is also considerable influence from Venezuela, as the traditional Wayuu territory is shared by the two nations.

=== Language ===
There are three main languages in La Guajira, the most widespread is the Spanish language, followed by the Wayuu language. The growing population of Middle Eastern immigrants has contributed the use of the Arabic language to the region. Koguis and Wiwas are more associated with the Chibchan languages, having their own dialect.

Spanish in La Guajira has also developed its own dialect mostly by taking words from the Wayuu language. The Wayuus and other indigenous groups are being given bilingual education in both their native language and Spanish. Numerous software companies such as Microsoft and Ubuntu have developed products in the Wayuu language.

There is also a small yet significant number of English speakers living in the Cerrejón miner's citadel, owing to the bilingual school there.

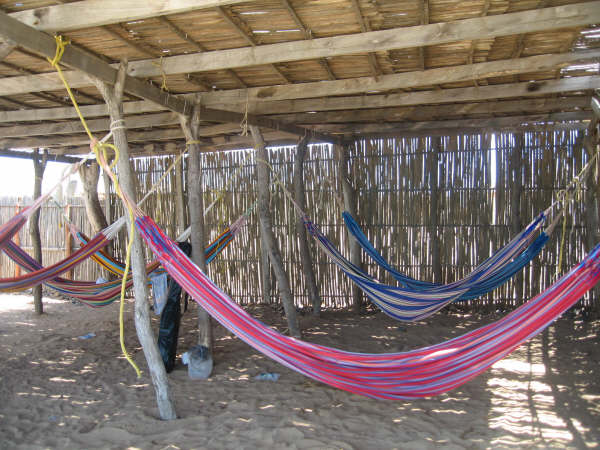
Typical Wayuu rectangular "day house" with hammocks by the Caribbean Sea. The Chinchorros hammocks are one of the most traditional items in the culture of La Guajira

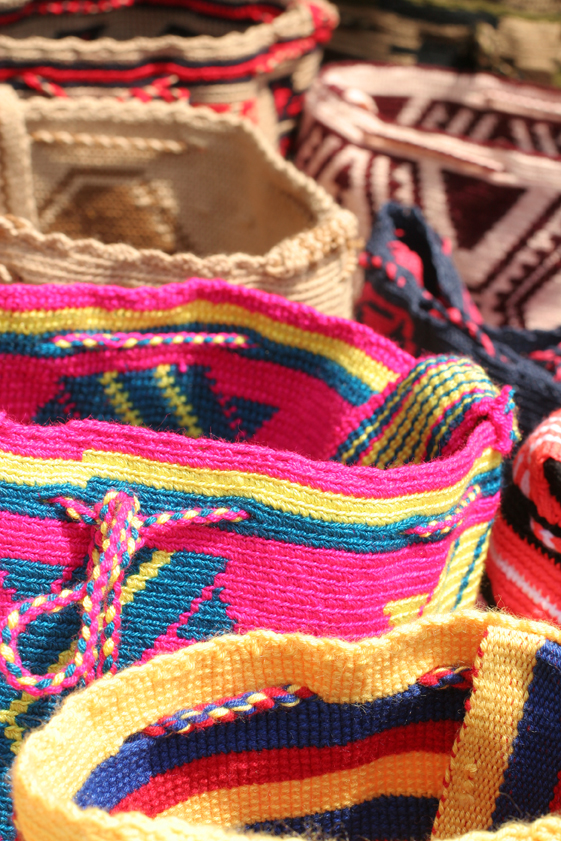
Wayuu handcrafted mochilas woolen bags have also transcended through cultures and fashion in Colombia.

Group	Language	Population
Mestizo	Spanish	300,000
Wayuu	Wayuunaiki	150,000
Koguis	Koguian/Tezhuan	7,100
Wiwas	Dámana/Terruna shayama	3,100
Middle Eastern	Arabic	3,061
Ika	Ikan	800
Inga or Kingui	Ingan	200

=== Literature ===
Literature in La Guajira has been both written in Spanish and Wayuunaiki, most of it describing the myths, the sacred, the tragic, the epics, the legends, heroism, the magic, the comedy, and romanticism autochthonous to the region and directly influenced by the Costumbrismo, including physiology and sexuality.

Wayuu tribes feature prominently in Papillon by Henri Charrière, which is about an escaped convict who takes refuge with one such tribe. La Guajira has been the subject of numerous writings describing its culture.

=== Music ===
Music in the Department of La Guajira has been associated with the indigenous peoples, as well as being influenced by the cultures of Afro-Colombians and Europeans. Such is the case of vallenato music, which allegedly originated in the region between Riohacha and Valledupar, with some considering larger area reaching from Riohacha to the central region of the Department of Cesar. The accordions and guitars first used for vallenato music were allegedly acquired in La Guajira as contraband arriving from the nearby island of Aruba, in the Caribbean Sea.

The Wayuu have contributed their own traditional music and instruments. Their culture associates economy and social life with music, such as in the case of raising cattle, where the indigenous sang to their animals. They also used music for meetings and celebrations, as well as mourning, at funerals. The Yonna is the traditional dance of the Wayuu and is performed to honor guests.

The Wayuus created many rustic musical instruments, such as Kashi, Sawawa (a type of flute), ma'asi, totoy, and the taliraai (tubular flute), wootoroyoi (type of clarinet), among others. The Majayura, or ritual of the "young wayuu virgin", in which a female dances towards a male considered a prospective mate, while other males perform rhythms with their traditional instruments, until the one male tumbles to the ground.

=== Gastronomy ===
Gastronomy in the Department of La Guajira is associated with the traditional gastronomy of the indigenous Wayuu, based on local fauna and flora, as well as being influenced by Spanish cuisine. The most representative of Guajira cuisine is friche – a fried or stewed goat seasoned with salt and its own blood and guts. There are also Arroz con camarones – rice with shrimp, where the rice is cooked with previously boiled shrimp and put out to dry in the sun; iguana stew with coconuts; Iguaraya – the fruit of the cactus, which the Wayuus use for drinking juice or wine; and turtles, deer, and capybaras cooked in a variety of ways, usually with rice, in soup or a stew.

== Coat of Arms ==
Coat of arms of La Guajira
- Armiger: The Department of La Guajira
- Adopted: November 29, 1966
- Shield: Quarterly: Vert, a one towered castle, Or, masoned and ajouré sable, Argent, a foil erect Or with hilt and pommel gules, fesswise addorsed arrows barbed and feathered sable, Vert, sun in his glory Or, Argent, a desert landscape proper.
- Other elements: A bordure of peals argent.
- Use: Official paperwork.

The coat of arms of the La Guajira was officially adopted by the Departmental Assembly Ordinance 028 of November 29, 1966 after the winning design of a public contest of pseudonymous contestant "Angel Cuervo". The coat of arms has subsequently been modified two occasions by the Ordinance 052 of 1994 and Ordinance 009 of March 10, 1998.

== Flag ==
The flag of La Guajira was officially adopted by the Departmental Assembly by means of Ordinance 028 of September 29, 1966. Previously, the flag had already been in use as the flag of the Intendancy of La Guajira, and subsequently it was modified last by Ordinance 052 of 1994. The Gubernatorial Standard is based on the Flag of the department but it is charged at the centre with the Coat of arms of the Department of La Guajira.

== See also ==
- Bahia Portete (La Guajira, Colombia)
