= 2022 Colombian presidential primaries =

Colombia's 2022 presidential primaries

The 2022 Colombian presidential primaries were a series of public votes held on 13 March 2022. The major political coalitions of Colombia held the primaries to determine their presidential candidates for the 2022 Colombian presidential election that would be held two weeks later.

== Historic Pact for Colombia ==
The Historic Pact for Colombia (Spanish: Pacto Histórico por Colombia) is a coalition of left-wing, progressive, and Indigenous politicians. Five pre-candidates representing six political parties or movements announced that they would be standing for election as the unified presidential candidate for the coalition.

=== Nominee ===
2022 Historic Pact Coalition ticket
Gustavo Petro	Francia Márquez
for President	for Vice President
Mayor of Bogotá (2012–2014)	Environmentalism activist (2010–present)

- Gustavo Petro, senator, former mayor of Bogota, and runner-up in the 2018 Colombian presidential election (Humane Colombia; Patriotic Union)
- Francia Márquez, Afro-Colombian human-rights and environmental activist (Alternative Democratic Pole)
- Camilo Romero, former governor of Nariño (Greens for Change)
- Arelis Uriana, Wayuu community leader (Indigenous and Social Alternative Movement)
- Alfredo Saade, evangelical pastor (Broad Democratic Alliance)

=== Primary results ===
Party	Party logo	Candidate	Votes	%
Humane Colombia		Gustavo Petro (Note: Member of Humane Colombia, also endorsed by Patriotic Union)	4,495,831	80.50%
Patriotic Union		Gustavo Petro	4,495,831	80.50%
Alternative Democratic Pole		Francia Márquez (Note: Endorsed by the Alternative Democratic Pole)	785,215	14.05%
Green Alliance		Camilo Romero	227,218	4.06%
Indigenous and Social Alternative Movement		Arelis Uriana	54,770	0.98%
Broad Democratic Alliance		Alfredo Saade	21,724	0.38%

Petro was announced as the winner of the public vote and was nominated to be the candidate of the Historic Pact for Colombia coalition.

== Hope Center Coalition ==
The Hope Center Coalition (Spanish: Coalición Centro Esperanza), formerly known as the Coalition of Hope (Spanish: Coalición de la Esperanza) until 28 November 2021, is a coalition of centre and centre-left politicians. Five pre-candidates announced that they would be standing for election as the unified presidential candidate for the coalition.

=== Nominee ===
2022 Hope Center Coalition ticket
Sergio Fajardo	Luis Gilberto Murillo
for President	for Vice President
Governor of Antioquia (2012–2016)	Minister of Environment and Sustainable Development (2016–2018)

- Juan Manuel Galán, former senator (New Liberalism)
- Sergio Fajardo, former mayor of Medellín (Independent Social Alliance)
- Jorge Enrique Robledo, senator (Dignity)
- Carlos Amaya, former governor of Boyacá (We Are Green Hope)
- Alejandro Gaviria, former Minister of Health and Social Protection (Colombia Has a Future)

=== Primary results ===
Party	Party logo	Candidate	Votes	%
Independent Social Alliance		Sergio Fajardo	723,475	33.50%
New Liberalism		Juan Manuel Galán	487,019	22.55%
We are Green Hope (Dignity-ASI)		Carlos Amaya	451,223	20.89%
Colombia Has a Future		Alejandro Gaviria	336,504	15.58%
Dignity		Jorge Enrique Robledo	161,244	7.46%

Fajardo was announced as the winner of the public vote and was nominated to be the candidate of the Hope Center Coalition.

== Team for Colombia Coalition ==
The Team for Colombia Coalition (Spanish: Coalición Equipo por Colombia) is a coalition of centre-right and right-wing politicians. Five pre-candidates announced that they would be standing for election as the unified presidential candidate for the coalition.

=== Nominee ===
2022 Team for Colombia Coalition ticket
Federico Gutiérrez	Rodrigo Lara
for President	for Vice President
Mayor of Medellín (2016–2019)	Mayor of Neiva (2016–2019)

- Aydeé Lizarazo (Independent Movement of Absolute Renovation)
- Alejandro Char, former mayor of Barranquilla (Land of Opportunities)
- David Barguil, senator (Colombian Conservative Party)
- Enrique Peñalosa, former mayor of Bogota (Party of the U)
- Federico Gutiérrez, former mayor of Medellín (We Believe Colombia)

=== Primary results ===
Party	Party logo	Candidate	Votes	%
Creemos Colombia		Federico Gutiérrez	2,161,686	54.18%
Land of Opportunities		Alejandro Char	707,007	17.72%
Colombian Conservative Party		David Barguil	629,510	15.77%
Independent Movement of Absolute Renovation		Aydeé Lizarazo	259,771	6.51%
Union Party for the People		Enrique Peñalosa	231,668	5.80%

Gutiérrez was announced as the winner of the public vote and was nominated to be the candidate of the Team for Colombia Coalition.

== Other candidates ==
- Rodolfo Hernández, former mayor of Bucaramanga (League of Anti-Corruption Governors). Hernández announced on 29 June 2021 that he would run as an independent candidate. On 13 December 2021, Hernández announced that he had delivered nearly 1.9 million signatures to the National Registry in support of his candidacy.
- John Milton Rodríguez, senator (Fair and Free Colombia). Rodríguez was chosen as the candidate of the evangelical Christian party Fair and Free Colombia (Spanish: Colombia Justa Libres) at the party's national convention in November 2021, obtaining 75% of the delegates' votes.
- Enrique Gómez Martínez (National Salvation Movement). On 1 November 2021, Gómez Martínez announced that he was relaunching the conservative National Salvation Movement (Spanish: Movimiento Salvación Nacional) that had been founded by his late uncle Álvaro Gómez Hurtado. On 1 December 2021, the National Registry accepted the return of the National Salvation Movement as a political party, and Gómez Martínez became the party's presidential candidate.
