= Gustavo Petro 2022 presidential campaign =

Successful Colombian presidential campaign

Gustavo Petro presidential campaign, 2022
- Campaign: 2022 Colombian presidential election
- Candidate: Gustavo Petro; Mayor of Bogotá (2012–2014); Francia Márquez; Environmentalism activist
- Affiliation: Humane Colombia; Coalition partner Historic Pact for Colombia
- Status: Announced: 22 September 2021; Presumptive nominee: 12 March 2022; Official nominee: 13 March 2022; Qualified for run-off: 29 May 2022; Won the election: 19 June 2022
- Receipts: COP 4.150.097,17

Website
- www.gustavopetro.com.co

The 2022 presidential campaign of Gustavo Petro In 2021, Petro declared that he would be running in the 2022 elections. In September 2021, Petro announced that he would retire from politics if his campaign were not to succeed, stating that he does not intend to be an "eternal candidate". Petro's campaign platform included promoting green energy over fossil fuels and a decrease in economic inequality. He has promised to focus on climate change and reducing greenhouse gas emissions that cause it by ending fossil fuel exploration in Colombia. He also pledged to raise taxes on the wealthiest 4,000 Colombians and said that neoliberalism would ultimately "destroy the country". Petro also announced that he would be open to having president Iván Duque stand trial for police brutality committed during the 2021 Colombian protests. Furthermore, he promised to establish the ministry of equality. Following his victory in the Historic Pact primary, Petro selected Afro-Colombian Human Rights and environmental activist and recipient of the Goldman Environmental Prize, Francia Márquez, to be his running mate.

Among the key points of his program, he proposes an agrarian reform to restore productivity to 15 million hectares of land to end "narco-feudalism" (in Spanish, "narco-latifundismo"); a halt to all new oil exploration in order to wean the country off its dependence on the extractive and fossil fuel industries; infrastructure for access to water and development of the rail network; investment in public education and research; tax reform and reform of the largely privatized health system. Petro announced that his first act as president will be to declare a state of economic emergency to combat widespread hunger. He is advocating progressive proposals on women's rights and LGBTQ issues. Petro also stated that he would restore diplomatic relations with Venezuela. He proposed combatting Colombia's cocaine trade with the growth of legal marijuana, and has opposed extraditions of accused drug criminals to the United States.

== Presidential ticket ==
Historic Pact Coalition ticket, 2022
Gustavo Petro	Francia Márquez
for President	for Vice President
Mayor of Bogotá (2012–2014)	Environmentalism activist (2010–present)

== Running mate selection process ==
The Historic Pact for Colombia (Spanish: Pacto Histórico por Colombia) is a coalition of left-wing, progressive, and Indigenous politicians. Five pre-candidates representing six political parties or movements announced that they would be standing for election as the unified presidential candidate for the coalition. The candidate was chosen by public vote on 13 March 2022.

The candidates were:

- Gustavo Petro, senator, former mayor of Bogota, and runner-up in the 2018 Colombian presidential election (Humane Colombia; Patriotic Union)
- Francia Márquez, Afro-Colombian human-rights and environmental activist (Alternative Democratic Pole)
- Camilo Romero, former governor of Nariño (Greens for Change)
- Arelis Uriana, Wayuu community leader (Indigenous and Social Alternative Movement)
- Alfredo Saade, evangelical pastor (Broad Democratic Alliance)

== Primary results ==
Party	Party logo	Candidate	Votes	%
Humane Colombia		Gustavo Petro (Note: Member of Humane Colombia, also endorsed by Patriotic Union)	4,495,831	80.50%
Patriotic Union		Gustavo Petro	4,495,831	80.50%
Alternative Democratic Pole		Francia Márquez (Note: Member of Soy Porque Somos, but endorsed by the Alternative Democratic Pole)	785,215	14.05%
Soy Porque Somos		Francia Márquez	785,215	14.05%
Green Alliance		Camilo Romero	227,218	4.06%
Indigenous and Social; Alternative Movement		Arelis Uriana	54,770	0.98%
Broad Democratic Alliance		Alfredo Saade	21,724	0.38%

Petro was announced as the winner of the public vote and was nominated to be the candidate of the Historic Pact for Colombia coalition.

== Campaign background ==
The economist, former guerrilla, and former mayor of Bogotá, Gustavo Petro, previously a candidate in the 2010 and 2018 Colombian presidential elections, maintained a lead in most opinion polls and was set during the election to become the first president of Colombia from a left-wing coalition. In September 2021, Petro promised that he would retire from politics should his campaign for the presidency be unsuccessful. Petro said he would do so as he did not want to be an "eternal candidate". Of his campaign, Gwynne Dyer wrote: "Petro is a known quantity, active in politics for the past thirty years. He's not really radical, but he would be Colombia's first-ever president from the left, so for some Colombians his policies would seem extreme: things like expanding social programs, ending oil and gas exploration, and investing in agriculture." His political party, Humane Colombia, promoted the creation of the Historic Pact for Colombia coalition, which includes social movements, socialist, environmental, and feminist associations. The ideological diversity of the coalition was seen as a source of internal tension, and Petro tried to win over more of the middle class during his campaign, which led him to moderate his economic program and his criticism of the private sector, while trying to distance himself from Venezuela, which he previously supported; he maintained his position of re-establishing bilateral relations with the government of Nicolás Maduro. During the campaign, he was critical of the neoliberal system of the Colombian economy and its reliance on oil and gas, advocated progressive proposals on women's rights and LGBTQ issues, and supported a peace agreement between the state and the guerrillas. Proposals from Petro to change the nation's economic model by piling taxes on unproductive landowners, as well as abandoning oil and coal for clean energy, upset investors. Some feared his efforts to shift wealth from rich to poor could cause Colombia to become similar to present-day Venezuela. Critics claim his ideas are also similar to the early days of Hugo Chávez's government in Venezuela. Petro was critical of the Maduro government's commitment to oil usage whilst on the campaign trail. In an interview with Le Monde, Petro argued that "Maduro's Venezuela and Duque's Colombia are more similar than they seem", pointing to both governments' commitment to non-renewable energy and the "authoritarian drift" of the two. Regarding Chávez, Petro praised his efforts to bolster equality but said that Chávez "made a serious mistake of linking his social program to oil revenues". During the campaign, Petro and his running mate Francia Márquez faced numerous death threats from paramilitary groups. Petro cancelled rallies in the Colombian coffee region in early May 2022 after his security team uncovered an alleged plot by the La Cordillera gang. In response to this and other similar situations, 90 elected officials and prominent individuals from 20 countries signed an open letter expressing concern and condemnation of attempts of political violence against Márquez and Petro. The letter highlighted the assassination of over 50 social leaders, trade unionists, environmentalists, and other community representatives in 2022. Signatories of the letter included former Ecuadorian president Rafael Correa, American linguist and philosopher Noam Chomsky, and French member of the National Assembly Jean-Luc Mélenchon. Petro received the support of Luis Gilberto Murillo.

=== Polls ===
During the campaign, his opponents said that he planned expropriation measures if he becomes president, and argued similarities with Venezuela's Nicolás Maduro. Proposals from Petro to change the nation's economic model were criticized for increasing taxes on unproductive landowners and for upsetting oil and coal investors by his platform to move to clean energy. Critics said his efforts to shift more of Colombia's wealth to the poor could turn Colombia into another Venezuela, and also compared his ideas to those of the early days of Hugo Chávez's government in Venezuela. In response, he signed a public document on 18 April in which he pledged not to carry out any type of expropriation if elected. During a presidential debate hosted by El Tiempo on 14 March, candidates responded to a question about relations with Venezuela and Nicolás Maduro. Whilst other participants responded by stating Venezuela is a dictatorship and expressing reluctance toward restoring relations, Petro replied, "if the theory is that with a dictatorship you can't have diplomatic relations, and Venezuela is, [then] why does this government have relations with the United Arab Emirates, which is a dictatorship, perhaps worse [than Venezuela]?" He also stated that diplomatic relations are established with nations and not with individuals. Whilst he has praised former Venezuelan president Hugo Chávez for bolstering equality, Petro said during an interview with French newspaper Le Monde in May 2022 that Chávez made a "serious mistake of linking his social program to oil revenues". He also criticized Venezuela's commitment to oil by president Maduro. Petro argued that "Maduro's Venezuela and Duque's Colombia are more similar than they seem", pointing to the Duque administration's commitment to non-renewable energy and the "authoritarian drift" of both governments. General Eduardo Zapateiro, commander of the National Army of Colombia, also criticized Petro during the campaign, causing controversy.

== Election results ==
Petro received the most votes in the first round held on 29 May but fell short of the 50% required to avoid a runoff. He and Márquez faced the former mayor of Bucaramanga and businessman, Rodolfo Hernández Suárez and his running mate Marelen Castillo in the run-off on 19 June. Shortly after the first round, Luis Gilberto Murillo, who was the running mate of Sergio Fajardo on the Hope Center Coalition ticket, endorsed Petro for the second round. In the second round, Petro and Márquez won the election by winning 50.44% of the popular vote against Hernández.

== Party representation ==
- Humane Colombia
- Alternative Democratic Pole

== See also ==
- Presidency of Gustavo Petro
- 2022 Colombian presidential election
- Gustavo Petro 2018 presidential campaign
- Gustavo Petro 2010 presidential campaign
