= Resguardo Indígena de Mayabangloma =

Mayabangloma Indigenous Reserve (Spanish: Resguardo Indígena de Mayabangloma) is an indigenous reserve in the municipality of Fonseca, Department of La Guajira in northern Colombia. The reserve is formed by the veredas Mayalita, Bangañita, La Gloria and La Loma, occupying a farm called "El Porvenir" formed by Resolution 046 of November 19, 1994. The reserve is inhabited by ethnic groups pertaining to the Wayuu people and covers approximately some 3.8 km^{2}.

According to a census in 2003 the population of the reserve was of approximately 1,252 inhabitants in 286 families. The base of these indigenous families is mostly based on clans, extensive families or nucleic families. Family consanguinity is considered matrilineal.

Politician and indigenous leader Arelis Uriana was born there in 1976.

== See also ==
- Wayuu
- Indigenous peoples in Colombia
