= Débora Barros =

Colombian human rights activist

- Born: Bahía Portete, Uribia, La Guajira, Colombia
- Other name: Débora Barros Fince
- Known for: Human rights activism

Débora Barros Fince is a Colombian human rights activist. A member of the Wayuu people, she became known as a prominent indigenous leader within the Colombian peace process after several of her relatives were killed or disappeared during the Bahía Portete massacre in 2004.

== Early life and education ==
Barros was born in Bahía Portete, a town in the Uribia municipality of the Colombian department of La Guajira. She was born into a Wayuu family, an indigenous group native to the Guajira Peninsula.

Barros obtained a diploma in civil procedural law, with a focus on human rights and international humanitarian law. After her graduation, she worked for a time as a police inspector in Uribia.

== Activism ==
On 18 April 2004, a group of around 40 paramilitaries from the United Self-Defence Forces of Colombia's Wayuu Counter-Insurgency Bloc, led by Rodrigo Tovar Pupo, shot and killed 12 members of the Wayuu community living in Bahía Portete. This included Barros' maternal aunt, Rosa Fince, a community leader; Fince's sisters Diana and Reina were forcibly disappeared. Barros was not in Bahía Portete at the time of the massacre, due to her working in the week in Uribia. The killings led to the displacement of 600 people living in the area, including Barros, who received death threats from a paramilitary identified as Pablo.

A month after the massacre, Barros joined the National System for Comprehensive Attention and Reparation for Victims as its national representative for victims. She went on to create Mujeres Tejiendo la Paz/Wayúu Munsurrat (lit. 'Women Weaving Peace'), which supports victims of sexual and domestic violence, with her sister Telemina Barros. Through MTP, Barros also has campaigned for women to be included in national reconciliation efforts in Colombia, as well as to keep the story of the massacre and its victims in public consciousness. Barros has criticised the School of the Americas, a United States military training institute whose graduates have included people who went on to become Colombian paramilitaries. In 2014 and 2015, Barros travelled to Havana, Cuba as part of the "victim's delegation" during Colombian peace talks, representing survivors from different ethnic groups, genders, and regions calling for peace and reconciliation.

Barros has campaigned for Wayuu people to return to their ancestral homelands in Guajira; many members of the community had been displaced during the Colombian conflict. In 2014, a decade after the massacre, Barros and her family returned to Bahía Portete. Barros Fince has criticised the presence of Chevron projects in tradition Wayuu territories, which she stated caused displacement, pollution, and the decline of Waiyuu land and culture. She accused them of manipulating the community by giving bribes to Waiyuu leaders to create support for the project.

Politically, Barros served as Secretary of the Departmental Government for La Guajira. In 2021, Barros stood as a candidate on the Conservative Party list for the Chamber of Representatives, in the municipality of Maicao.

On 27 January 2019, Barros reported that a motorcyclist with a gun had followed her. She stated that she and her sister had not received security protection from the National Protection Unit since late 2016. The National Center for Historical Memory called for the allegation to be investigated by Colombian authorities.

On 20 December 2023, Barros' brother José Miguel was assassinated while walking in Nuestra Señora de los Remedios, a neighbourhood in Riohacha, by two men on a motorcycle.
