= Carmen Ramírez =

Carmen Ramírez may refer to:

- Carmen Ramírez Boscán (born 1982), Colombian human rights activist and politician
- Carmen Ramírez Degollado (born 1940), Mexican food expert and restauranteur
- Carmen Ramírez de Sinibaldi, wife of Alejandro M. Sinibaldi, first lady of Guatemala in 1885
- Carmen Ramírez, U.S.-based trade-unionist, Oregon Woman of Achievement in 2007

== See also ==
- María del Carmen Ramírez (born 1956), Mexican politician
- Mari Carmen Ramírez (born 1955), American art historian and curator
- Mary Carmen Ramírez (born 1932), Spanish actress and mezzo-soprano
