= Camilo Romero =

Camilo Romero may refer to:

- Camilo Romero (footballer) (born 1970), Mexican footballer
- Camilo Romero (politician) (born 1976), Colombian journalist, politician and diplomat
