= David Barguil =

Colombian politician (born 1981)

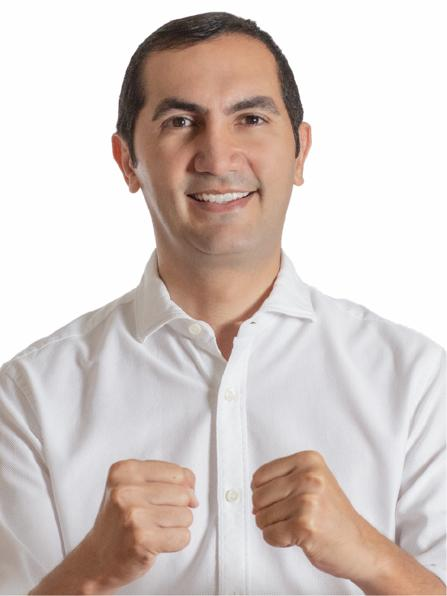

Senator of Colombia
- Incumbent
- Assumed office 20 July 2026
- In office 20 July 2018 – 20 July 2022

Member of the Chamber of Representatives
- In office 20 July 2010 – 20 July 2018
- Constituency: Córdoba

President of the Conservative Party
- In office 27 August 2014 – 27 December 2016
- Preceded by: Ómar Yepes
- Succeeded by: Hernán Andrade

Personal details
- Born: David Alejandro Barguil Assis; 23 June 1981 (age 45) Cereté, Córdoba, Colombia
- Party: Conservative (2010-present)
- Spouse: María Paz Gaviria (m. 2016; div. 2018) María Victoria Ramírez (m. 2019)
- Children: 1
- Education: Universidad Externado de Colombia
- Website: Senate website

David Alejandro Barguil Assis (born 23 June 1981) is a Colombian politician, Master of Finance and member of the Conservative Party.

Barguil has served as a Colombian Congressman, having served as a member of the Chamber of Representatives from 2010 to 2018, representing the department of Córdoba and more recently as a Senator of Colombia from 2018 to 2022, obtaining in the latter the highest vote in the 2018 Parliamentary election and the highest election of a congressman from the Conservative Party.

On 27 August 2014, he was unanimously elected as the President of the National Board of the Conservative Party, a position he held until 27 December 2016, being the youngest president in the history of that group, with 33 years at that time.

On 20 October 2021, his candidacy for the presidency of Colombia was announced as a pre-candidate of the Conservative Party, being later unanimously ratified as the official candidate of the Conservative Party for the 2022 Parliamentary election, in which he received the third highest vote of his coalition Team for Colombia during the 2022 Colombian presidential primaries.

== Personal life ==
David Alejandro Barguil Assis was born on 23 June 1981, in Cereté, Córdoba into a conservative middle-class family, of Syrian origin as a child he was abandoned by his father, for which his mother worked as a single mother, attended the León de Greff school until high school and where he would later graduate, being a member of the Creative Youth Organization group, later he would participate in a television program aimed at young audiences that was broadcast by Telecaribe. Later he graduated in Finance, Government, International Relations, specialist in Contract Law and Business Legal Relations from the Universidad Externado de Colombia. Then he would move to Montreal, Canada as a fellow in the Economics and Politics program at the Université de Montreal
