= Gustavo Petro 2010 presidential campaign =

Colombian political campaign

Gustavo Petro presidential campaign, 2010
- Campaigned for: 2010 Colombian presidential election
- Candidate: Gustavo Petro; Member of Chamber of Representatives (1998-2006); Clara López; Auditor General of the Republic (2003-2005)
- Affiliation: Alternative Democratic Pole
- Status: Announced: 3 March 2009; Presumptive nominee: 12 March 2009; Official nominee: 27 September 2007; Qualified for run-off: 7 October 2010; Won the election: 20 October 2010
- Receipts: COP 2.150.097,17
- Website: www.gustavopetro.com.co

The 2010 presidential campaign of Gustavo Petro in 2010, Gustavo Petro was elected presidential candidate, this time obtaining the fourth best result in the vote count in the first round on May 27 with 1,331,267, a sum that was not enough to advance to the second round on June 20.

Petro obtained the support of the Democratic Pole and the Patriotic Union party, two of his main supports throughout his political career.

== Presidential ticket ==
linkk=Alternative Democratic Pole Alternative Democratic Pole ticket, 2010
Gustavo Petro	Clara López
for President	for Vice President
Member of Chamber of Representatives (1998–2006)	Auditor General of the Republic (2003-2005)

== Campaign background ==
Since former President Álvaro Uribe Vélez was elected for a second presidential term, some sectors of Uribismo raised the idea of seeking constitutional mechanisms that would allow Uribe to aspire to a third term. The first promoter of this initiative was the then conservative senator Ciro Ramírez, who presented this project at the beginning of 2007.

In September of that same year, the Partido de la U led by its congressman Luis Guillermo Giraldo promoted a project to call a referendum to decide the possibility of electing President Álvaro Uribe Vélez for the period 2010-2014. To this end, a campaign was launched in 2008 in which 5 million citizen signatures were collected, of which the National Registry endorsed 3,900,000.

Once the signatures were collected and endorsed by the Registry, between August 2008 and August 2009 the two chambers of Congress processed the project to call the referendum. During this period, a series of irregularities in the process of collecting signatures were revealed, such as the confusing wording of the question that only allowed Álvaro Uribe to run for re-election in 2014, the violation of the funding limits authorized by the law or the participation of the Transval company (owned by the extradited David Murcia Guzmán) in the transfer of the signatures. Despite the doubts, the Congress of the Republic approved a referendum project to become effective in the 2010 presidential elections.

In accordance with the constitutional procedure, Alejandro Ordóñez, Attorney General of the Nation, gave a favorable opinion to the initiative and asked the Constitutional Court to declare it enforceable in January 2010. However, on February 26, 2010 the Constitutional Court, with seven votes in favor and two against, declared the referendum unenforceable, by accepting the presentation of magistrate Humberto Sierra Porto according to which the project had five process and competition defects.

Additionally, these irregularities led to an investigation by the National Electoral Council,15 which on March 4 declared the signature collection process invalid. Due to the same facts, the Office of the Attorney General of the Nation is currently an investigation for procedural fraud against the promoters of the referendum.

== Party representation ==
- Alternative Democratic Pole

== See also ==
- Presidency of Gustavo Petro
- 2010 Colombian presidential election
- Gustavo Petro 2022 presidential campaign
- Gustavo Petro 2018 presidential campaign
