= Pütchipü'ü =

Traditional mediator in the Wayuu culture

Palabrero
- Pütchipü'ü
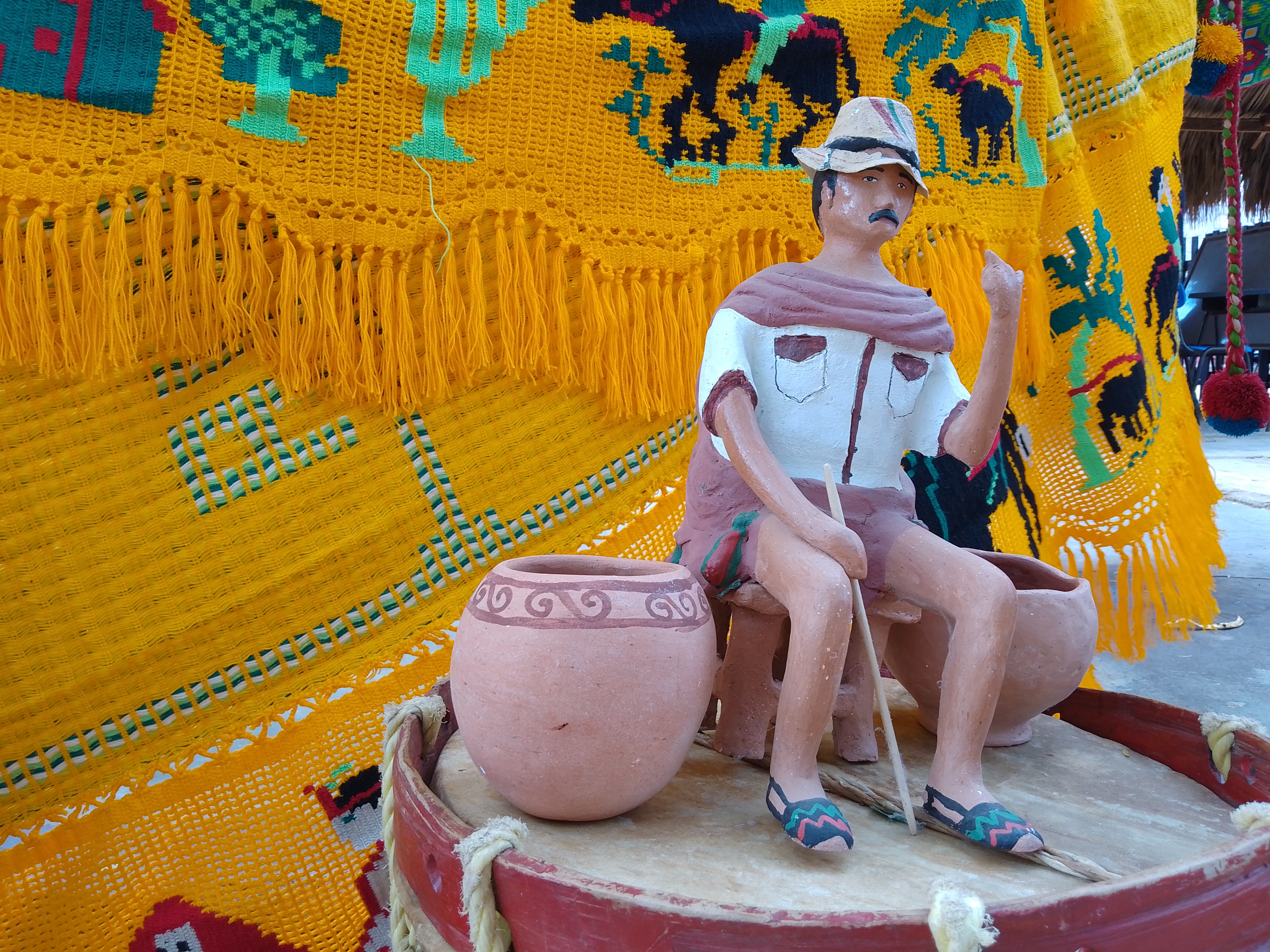
- Jurisdiction: Wayuu people

Wayuu normative system, applied by the Pütchipü’üi (palabrero)
- UNESCO Intangible Cultural Heritage
- Country: Colombia
- Reference: 00435
- Region: Latin America and the Caribbean

Inscription history
- Inscription: 2010 (5th session)
- List: Representative

A pütchipü'ü, or pütche'ejachi (in Wayuu, "messenger of the word"; Spanish: palabrero), is a mediator and the central element in the traditional administration justice system of the Wayuu people. The role of the pütchipü'ü was recognized as Intangible Cultural Heritage of Humanity by UNESCO in 2010. They are organized by the Major Autonomous Board of Palabreros, on which 37 pütchipü'ui served on in 2010.

== Description ==
The role of a pütchipü'ü is to solve conflicts through mediation and negotiation. This can include conflicts between different members or clans of the Wayuu community or with people or organizations outside the Wayuu people. Both parties involved in a dispute may request a pütchipü'ü. The pütchipü'ü then evaluates the situation at hand and subsequently notifies relevant authorities of his solution to the conflict. This negotiation includes material compensation to be paid by the aggravating family to the aggrieved family group at special events, after which the parties involved in the dispute reconcile with each other; even the most serious crimes are compensated. The pütchipü'ü also serves as a messenger between communities.

== Recognition ==
In 2010, this mediation system was recognized by UNESCO as part of the Intangible Cultural Heritage of Humanity. This indigenous law system has been recognized by governments of Venezuela and Colombia. The pütchipü'ui are organized by the Major Autonomous Board of Palabreros; as of 2010, there were 37 pütchipü'ui serving the council, as well as a further 20 young Wayuu professionals, both from Venezuela and Colombia.

== See also ==
- Masterpieces of the Oral and Intangible Heritage of Humanity
- UNESCO Intangible Cultural Heritage Lists
