= Marriage in the pre-Columbian Americas =

History of marriage in pre-Columbian era

The marriage in pre-Columbian America was a social institution present in most cultures and civilizations inhabiting the American continent before 1492 (arrival of Columbus to America). The perceptions and conceptions at a social level varied, with wedding ceremonies often carrying a predominant religious and spiritual significance. Some unions were even regarded as sacred and could be either monogamous or polygamous.

== Historical context ==
Once the conquest of America was established followed by its subsequent European colonization, there were frequent cultural clashes with the conquistadors and other Europeans. This led to significant shifts in the way Amerindians viewed sexual relationships. Over time, they adapted their customs and traditions in a lengthy process of acculturation and cultural assimilation in line with the sexual morals of the conquistadors. For instance, in the realms of the Spanish, Portuguese, and French colonial empires, they were compelled to adhere to the Catholic sexual morality and modify some behaviors. This included their attitudes towards nudity, polygamy, fornication, social tolerance of homosexuality and bisexuality, chastity, and preserving virginity until marriage, among other aspects. This depended on each ethnic group, though there was a general consensus in opposing adultery, incest, and rape, practices that were equally condemned by the vast majority of indigenous peoples.

Regarding homosexuality in pre-Columbian peoples, there is recorded evidence of a wide range of perceptions among the different native tribes of America. Attitudes ranged from broad social tolerance to death sentences, varying by tribe and time period. It was socially accepted in some indigenous tribes of North America, where it was associated with the tribal concept of "two spirits." Religious or spiritual authorities did not object to unions between two men, seen through a worldview of gender identity.

== North America ==
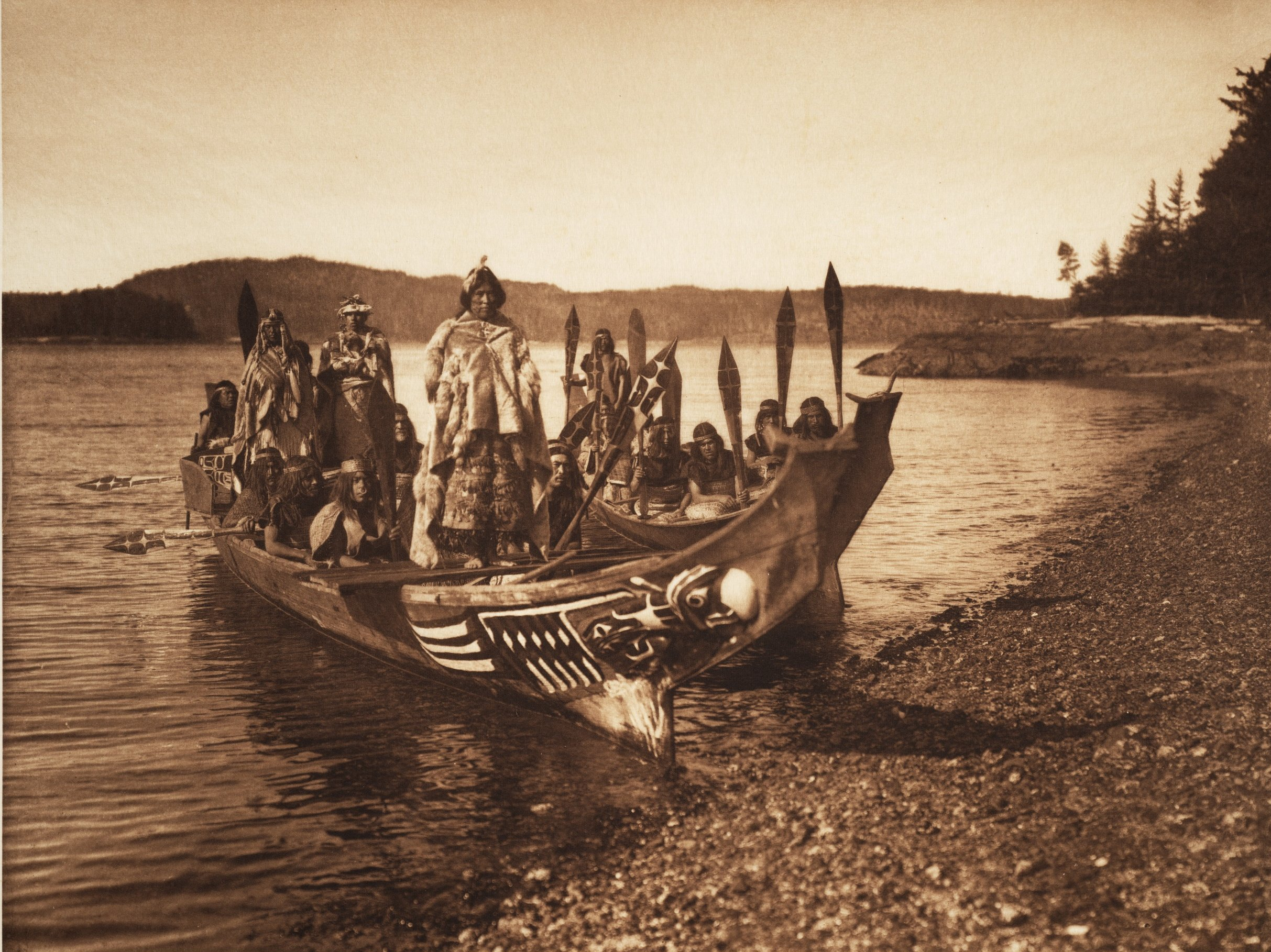
A wedding celebration of the kwakiutl tribe in Canada at the beginning of the 20th century.

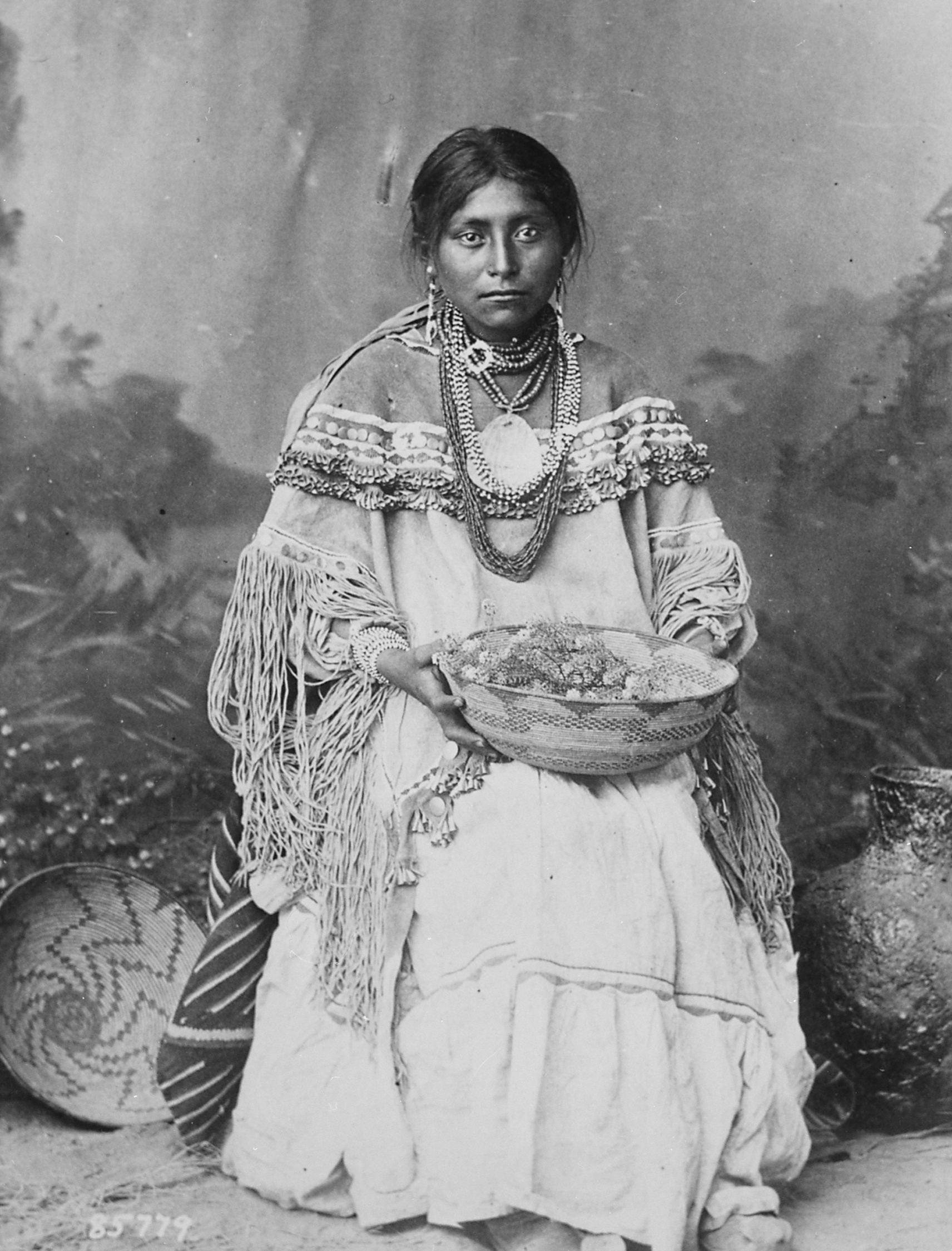
An apache woman in her bridal attire

For the Sioux tribes, marriage symbolized the unity of the couple under the principle of "together but not tied", explained as a moral in a traditional legend called "the eagle and the hawk". In this story, a wise man instructs a couple to hunt these two birds of prey alive but separately. Once captured, he asks them to tie the birds by their legs and release them. The birds, unable to fly, end up fighting each other. The lesson from this story is that both should "always fly together" but never be tied down, prioritizing mutual love while respecting the individuality of each being.

Among the Apache, who shared sociocultural traits with the Sioux and Cheyennes, a woman's chastity before marriage was one of the most important values for their society and spirituality, rooted in animism. The first menstruation of a woman was celebrated with a sacred transition ritual called "naihes". This rite consisted of a blessing for the now pubescent girl, complete with dances, feasts, and songs, beginning at dawn and lasting four days. To arrange a wedding, the families of the bride and groom would come together to organize the practical aspects of the union, always with the bride's consent. The groom's family held financial responsibility towards the bride's family, adhering to a matrilocal arrangement. The newlywed husband would move into his wife's family group to provide protection, but would also need to care for the needs of his own parents. The married couple would later move to a separate dwelling within the same tribe, establishing the "mother-in-law taboo", meaning the husband could not have direct verbal communication with his wife's mother.

The concept of marriage within the Eskimo kinship system was of an exogamous nature and had a worldview different from other cultures. There was no wedding ceremony or special rite for the occasion. Marital life began when families from different Inuit clans agreed on cohabitation between a man and a woman from their communities. However, love marriages were also possible with the clear aim of mutual cooperation and ensuring the survival of the ethnic group. In this context, the virginity of the couple played no role.

== Mesoamerica ==
For the Maya civilization, marriage was under a matrilocal system, viewed as the institution that granted life and represented its divine origin on Earth, incorporating spiritual and sacred elements for their Maya religion. The Mayas had experts in conducting arranged marriages called Ah atanzahob, who acted as "matchmakers", serving as intermediaries between the families of the bride and groom and preparing the wedding ceremony with a deep sacred meaning. Marriages usually had a strong endogamous nature, where marrying someone of the same caste and locality was well-regarded, but marriage between relatives (people with the same surname) and adultery were strictly prohibited. The wedding was a religious rite where the families of the couple exchanged gifts, and a Chilam (priest) officiated the wedding, performing a purification ritual of the couple with incense.

For the Aztecs, it was an arranged marriage initiated by the groom's parents, who played an essential role in the wedding ritual: they had to request the hand of the girl with gifts for the bride's family, and the initial response from their potential in-laws was always negative. On the second day, the procedure was repeated, this time consulting the bride's will. If the answer was affirmative, the ceremony proceeded, and the bride was taken to the groom's house amid a grand celebration of music and dances. After the wedding, the couple had to remain locked in a room for four days performing penance and fasting for their shared future, while the priests prepared the bed for the marriage to be consummated there.

Among the Ngäbe people, who lived in present-day territories of Panama and part of Costa Rica, arranged (or convenience) marriages within families of the same ethnicity were common. Girls were designated at an early age as future wives to their prospective husbands, with the wedding taking place once she had her menarche, between the ages of 12 and 14 when they were deemed adults and responsible in society. This was accompanied by a four-day ceremony, where the young girl was isolated from the community and counseled by the elder women of her tribe, receiving a special diet and purification baths. A very similar ceremony occurred among the Emberá people, inhabitants between Panama and present-day Colombia.

== The Caribbean ==
For the Kalinagos, a tribe historically residing on the Caribbean coast of South America and the Lesser Antilles, the nature of the marriage institution was versatile, depending on each particular situation. It could be monogamous or polygamous, endogamous or exogamous between different tribes for expansionist purposes, as well as matrilineal or patrilineal, based on agreements between families with a strong clan sense. For them, arranged marriages with the bride's consent also existed. However, during periods of war between tribes, a type of forced marriage was practiced, provided all the men of the bride's tribe had been defeated.

For the Taíno people, the indigenous inhabitants of the Caribbean, there were two types of marriage: the "general", which was monogamous and long-lasting, primarily for emotional reasons; and the royal marriage, which could be polygamous for the chiefs and the royalty of the tribe, serving mainly ceremonial and political purposes, as well as ensuring stability and peace among tribes. Hence, love was not a determining factor. Losing one's virginity was associated with rituals before marriage, and fidelity was one of the fundamental values in both types of marriage, with adultery being punishable by death.

== South America ==
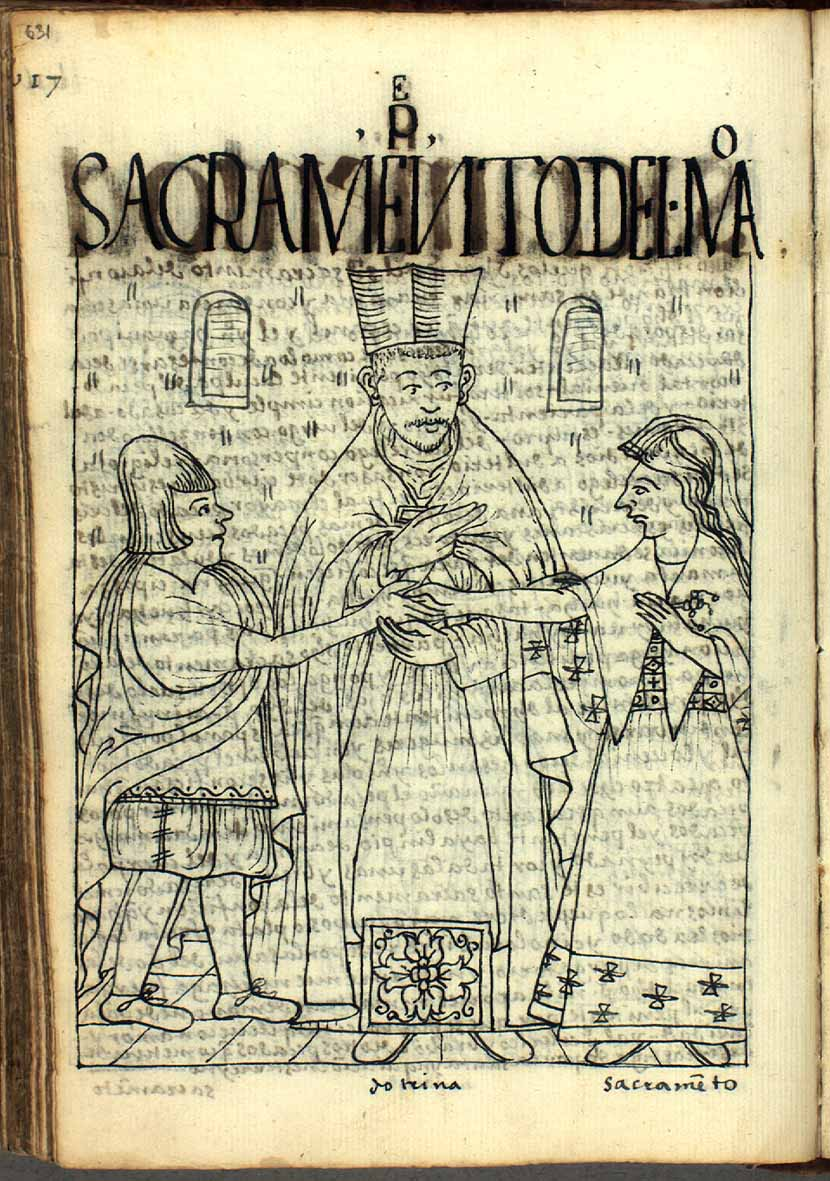
The sacrament of marriage as depicted in the Nueva Corónica by Guamán Poma (1615).

For the Inca civilization, with the consolidation of their empire, marriage became a matter of the state, seen as an administrative act without any particular sacred or divine connotation. However, the wedding ceremony was full of rites and traditions dedicated to their deities. Although polygamy was permitted, the first wife (also referred to as the primary wife) held higher hierarchical status than other concubines. Moreover, there was the practice of servinacuy, a trial period before marriage where couples could live together and engage in premarital sex, since a woman's virginity was not as significant in this culture. Another distinct aspect of this culture were symbolic child marriages between the children of curacas to establish alliances between different communities. These children remained in their parents' homes, without engaging in sexual relations, until the girl experienced her first menstruation and the rituals marking the onset of puberty in the boy took place. For the Inga people, mainly located in the Sibundoy Valley, marriage preparations began two weeks in advance. Couples abstained from sex before the wedding and committed to helping with the ceremony and celebration preparations. A taita, the spiritual leader of the Ingas, led the ceremony, which included various religious and symbolic rituals. One significant moment was when the bride was separated from her family to join the groom, forming a new monogamous family unit. For the Kichwa people, located in present-day Ecuador, the ceremony was similar to the Ingas'. The union of a man and a woman was seen as a pact between two families, and the celebration lasted three days: one day at the groom's house (kallari puncha), another at the bride's (kyoa puncha), and the third at the godparents' home (tukurik puncha). Spiritual elements included a chakana (Andean cross), floral and food offerings, and the tinkirina ritual, symbolizing the unbreakable union of two souls. This ritual involved flower crowns, anointing the couple with rose petals, and giving them two blessed plants or trees to be planted at their home. Their attire and decorations varied depending on whether the tribe originated from the Andes or the Amazon rainforest.

In the Aymara culture, jaqichasiña (the concept of marriage in this ethnicity) is a process that involves various rituals and tests for both parties as well as individually, within a complex system aimed at ensuring the couple's welfare and cohesion for a fruitful future, as well as their behavior and role within society. The union is strictly monogamous and is seen as a dual commitment of the couple to the community they belong to, both parties being on equal terms and usually governed by the chacha-warmi, although it relegates women to secondary roles at the social level.

Among the Wayuu people (present-day Colombia and Venezuela), the transition from childhood to puberty for a woman is marked by a traditional ritual called "the confinement", where the young girl who experiences her first menstruation becomes a Majajüt (young lady) and is no longer a "girl", beginning her marriageable age. She must be confined in a dwelling for a period ranging from six months to a year, where she learns weaving techniques and receives advice from the elder women of her family to prepare her for marital life. On the day of the girl's menarche, a rite is conducted in which she loses communication and contact with the male members of her family, her hair is cut, and she must undergo a purifying bath at midnight in the presence of the celebration's guests. To propose, the groom's family must present a dowry to the bride's family, which generally consists of animals and garments.

For the Mapuche people (present-day Chile and Argentina), marriage could be both polygamous and monogamous, depending on various factors, especially the social and hierarchical position of the man. Marriages tended to be exogamous between different lof, aiming to strengthen ties between communities through these unions, in a traditionally warlike people. The bride kidnapping among the Mapuches was a common ritual, which was usually simulated, though it could also be a real abduction that might involve premarital sexual relations right before the wedding day.

For the Yaghan, inhabitants of the Tierra del Fuego archipelago, marriage was a union based on love and joint work in a society with a strong sense of belonging to their clan. Courtship was vital and could last months or even years before the ceremony was organized. Both parties had to have undergone their Ciexaus, the puberty rite. Furthermore, it was common to marry widowers to someone from the same social group to avoid their loneliness.

== Bibliography ==
- Romero de Nohra, Flor (2001). Storm Goddesses: The Pre-Columbian Woman (in Spanish). Central University – University of Texas. ISBN 9789582600594.

Note: - "versalita" has been translated as "sc" (small caps) for Wikipedia. - "Diosas de tempestad: la mujer precolombina" has been translated as "Storm Goddesses: The Pre-Columbian Woman". This is an interpretative translation to capture the essence of the title. If the book has an official English title, it would be better to use that.
