= Fonseca, La Guajira =

Coordinates: 10°50′N 72°50′W

Fonseca
- Municipality and town
- Flag Coat of arms
- Motto: "Volver a ti es repetir la dicha de nacer"
- Location of the town and municipality of Fonseca in the Department of La Guajira.
- Country: Colombia
- Region: Caribbean
- Department: La Guajira

Government
  - Mayor: Hamilton García Peñaranda (Podemos)

Area
  - Municipality and town: 473.5 km^{2} (182.8 sq mi)
  - Urban: 5.46 km^{2} (2.11 sq mi)
- Elevation: 11.8 m (39 ft)

Population (2020 est.)
  - Municipality and town: 44,544
  - Density: 94.07/km^{2} (243.7/sq mi)
  - Urban: 39,662
  - Urban density: 7,260/km^{2} (18,800/sq mi)
- Time zone: UTC-5
- Climate: Aw
- Website: fonseca-guajira.gov.co/

Fonseca is a municipality located in the Colombian Department of La Guajira. The town celebrates the Festival del Retorno in honor of St Augustine with religious celebrations, vallenato music events and others.

== Geography ==
The municipality of Fonseca has a total area of 622 square kilometres or 240 square miles at an altitude of 11 metres or 36 feet above sea level at the seat of the municipality. The municipality is on a depression in the valley of the Ranchería River which flows through the municipality from west to east, between the Sierra Nevada de Santa Marta and the Serranía del Perijá.

Fonseca's northern borders meet the municipality of Riohacha and the Sierra Nevada de Santa Marta mountain range; to the south, the Bolivarian Republic of Venezuela and the Serranía del Perijá mountains; to the east, the municipality of Barrancas; and to the west, the municipality of San Juan del Cesar.

The average temperature throughout the year is 28 °C or 82.4 °F, varying according to altitude due to the mountainous environment. The municipality's climate ranges from hot semi-arid (Köppen BSh), as at the weather station of La Paulina, to tropical savanna (Aw) in wetter locations. There is a long, though not intense, wet season from April to November and a dry season from December to March with very little or no rain.

== Climate ==
Climate data for Fonseca (Paulina La), elevation 170 m (560 ft), (1981–2010)
Month	Jan	Feb	Mar	Apr	May	Jun	Jul	Aug	Sep	Oct	Nov	Dec	Year
Mean daily maximum °C (°F)	33.2 (91.8)	34.1 (93.4)	34.2 (93.6)	34.2 (93.6)	34.0 (93.2)	34.9 (94.8)	35.3 (95.5)	35.0 (95.0)	34.5 (94.1)	33.8 (92.8)	33.0 (91.4)	32.4 (90.3)	34.1 (93.4)
Daily mean °C (°F)	27.3 (81.1)	27.7 (81.9)	28.1 (82.6)	28.3 (82.9)	28.1 (82.6)	28.6 (83.5)	29.0 (84.2)	28.8 (83.8)	28.0 (82.4)	27.6 (81.7)	27.1 (80.8)	26.9 (80.4)	28.1 (82.6)
Mean daily minimum °C (°F)	22.1 (71.8)	22.1 (71.8)	22.4 (72.3)	22.9 (73.2)	23.5 (74.3)	24.0 (75.2)	24.0 (75.2)	23.7 (74.7)	23.1 (73.6)	22.9 (73.2)	23.0 (73.4)	22.4 (72.3)	23.0 (73.4)
Average precipitation mm (inches)	7.4 (0.29)	1.7 (0.07)	11.0 (0.43)	68.5 (2.70)	93.9 (3.70)	96.4 (3.80)	70.2 (2.76)	99.9 (3.93)	138.2 (5.44)	111.0 (4.37)	87.1 (3.43)	27.0 (1.06)	812.2 (31.98)
Average precipitation days	1	0	2	6	9	8	8	10	13	12	9	3	74
Average relative humidity (%)	70	69	69	70	75	73	70	73	77	80	78	78	73
Mean monthly sunshine hours	291.4	259.7	254.2	204.0	201.5	219.0	248.0	229.4	198.0	198.4	234.0	263.5	2,801.1
Mean daily sunshine hours	9.4	9.2	8.2	6.8	6.5	7.3	8.0	7.4	6.6	6.4	7.8	8.5	7.7
Source: Instituto de Hidrologia Meteorologia y Estudios Ambientales

== History ==
The area of Fonseca has been inhabited by different indigenous groups including Chimila, Tupe, Wayuu, Cariachile people and Motilon.

The date of Fonseca's original founding is uncertain, and there are two hypotheses about the foundation of Fonseca. One suggests that it was the Catalan colonizer Agustín Fonseca and, and the other, that it was the Italian José Agustín Parodi.

Agustín Fonseca was the leader of a group of adventurers who settled by the Ranchería river, until a rainy season lead to the river flooding the area and bringing diseases. They then moved to a dryer location, on what is supposedly the present-day main plaza of Fonseca.

José Agustín Parodi was a captain of the Spanish Crown and arrived by orders of the Spanish monarchy.

In 1773, Fonseca was registered as a jurisdiction of Santa Marta. On June 13, 1829, Decree 1954 established Fonseca as a municipality of the Intendencia of La Guajira. In 1954, La Guajira was re-established as an Intendencia and, in 1964, La Guajira separated from Magdalena and became its own Department.

=== Colombian armed conflict ===
Since the 1970s, Barrancas has been influenced by the Colombian armed conflict because of its strategic location between the Sierra Nevada de Santa Marta, the Serranía del Perijá mountain ranges and the border with Venezuela. The Revolutionary Armed Forces of Colombia (FARC), through its Caribbean Bloc's 59th, 19th and 41st fronts, and the National Liberation Army (ELN) guerrilla Gustavo Palmesano Front have practiced selective assassinations, kidnappings, extortions, forcedly recruitments, town sieges, arms and illegal drugs trafficking among others against the Colombian government and the civilian population.

The United Self-Defense Forces of Colombia (AUC) appeared in the area in the early 2000s led by alias Jorge 40. After a violent presence in the area, but also dissipating the guerrilla presence, the AUC demobilized in 2006.

== Politics ==
=== Administrative divisions ===
Fonseca comprises three corregimientos: Conejo, El Hatico and Sitio Nuevo. It also has eight Inspecciones de Policía: Bangañitas, El Confuso, Los Altos, Sabaneta, Los Pondores, Cardonal, Trigo and Cañaboba. There are twenty veredas: El Porvenir, El Potrero, Jaguey, Puyalito, El Puy, Potrerito, Los Toquitos, Hatico Viejo, La Yaya, San Agustín, Puerto López, Las Bendiciones, Las Marimondas, Las Colonias, La Villa, Guamachal, Mamarongo, El Chorro and Mamonal.

It has 32 urban neighborhoods, and several rural communities including La Mana, La Union, Arroyo Hondo, Sabana el Medio San Agustin, El Puy, El Toco, Los Roquitos and others. There is one indigenous reserve called Resguardo Indígena de Mayabangloma.

== Demographics ==
Population data pertaining to the municipality of Fonseca from the year 2000 to 2004.

Year	Urban	Rural	Total
2000	22,923	3,126	26,049
2001	23,702	3,232	26,934
2002	24,508	3,342	27,580
2003	25,341	3,456	28,797
2004	26,203	3,547	29,777

As of 2024, Fonseca had 45,706 urban residents and 5,482 rural residents, totalling 51,118.

== Culture ==
Fonseca celebrates the Festival del Retorno (Festival of the Return) every year in which people from Fonseca living in other towns, regions or countries are celebrated for their return to town.
