= National Center for Historical Memory =

Colombian government entity

- Centro Nacional de Memoria Histórica
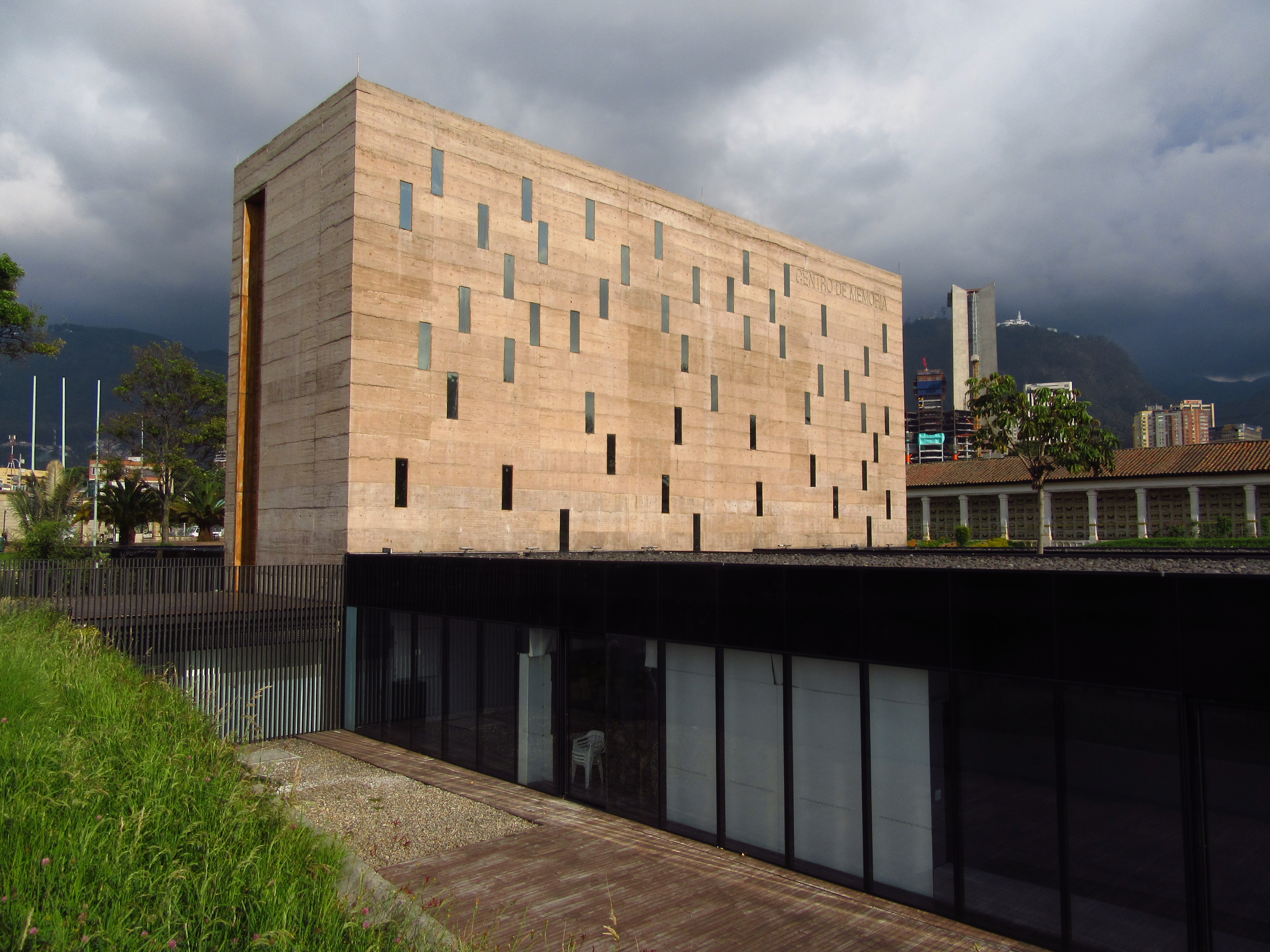
- the Center for Historical Memory building in Bogotá

Government entity overview
- Website: https://centrodememoriahistorica.gov.co/

Footnotes
- Part of Truth and reconciliation in Colombia

The National Center for Historical Memory (Centro Nacional de Memoria Histórica, NCHM) is a national and public entity attached to the Administrative Department for Social Prosperity (DSP) in Colombia.

== History ==
The NCHM was created by the Victims’ and Land Restitution Act of 2011 (Law 1448). The NCHM is in charge of contributing to the state´s duty of memory regarding the violations committed during the Colombian conflict. Also, it helps on the comprehensive reparation and the right to the truth to which the victims and the entire society are entitled.

The center produces public information available for everyone interested, through museum and educational activities that enrich the knowledge of the social and political history of Colombia. In 2021, the NCHM will inaugurate the Colombia’s National Museum of Memory, a platform for the dialogue and articulation of plural memories of the armed conflict that guarantees the inclusion of different actors and populations and contributes to the comprehensive reparation, historical clarification, guaranties of non-repetition and the construction of a sustainable peace.

Deemed to be very close to the Colombian government and the Armed Forces, the center was excluded in 2020 from the International Coalition of Sites of Conscience (which brings together more than 200 museums and memorials in over 60 countries). According to associations of victims of the conflict and historians, the center carries out "negationist" work by reducing the armed conflict to a struggle between the state and "terrorists.

The government approved the so-called "veterans' law," which provides that a space in the National Memory Museum be dedicated "to displaying to the public the life stories of veterans of the public force, especially highlighting their courageous actions, their sacrifice and their contribution to the general welfare.

The director of the organization, Darío Acevedo, resigned on July 7, 2022, following a complaint filed against him by the Special Jurisdiction for Peace for having altered documents, when he did not have the right to do so, in order to conceal the role of paramilitarism in the conflict. Darío Acevedo. He faced several controversies and was criticized by victims' associations who accused him of denial. In particular, he signed a controversial agreement with José Félix Lafaurie, president of the Colombian Federation of Cattle Breeders (FEDEGAN), to highlight the role of cattle breeders in the conflict, while FEDEGAN has often been criticized for financing paramilitary groups and opposing reparations to victims through land restitution.

== Organization ==
To fulfill its mandates and strategic objectives, the NCHM is divided into four large areas:

- Construction of Historical Memory Directorate
- National Museum of Memory Directorate
- Human Rights Archive Directorate
- Truth Agreements Directorate

One of its main objectives is the contribution to the clarification of the facts, the culprits and the conditions that made the armed conflict possible, as well as the institutional, political and social dynamics that unleashed and degraded the conflict.

Also, the NCHM works to:

- Consolidate the role of memory as a right and public patrimony.
- Dignify the victims and clarify the violent acts committed during the armed conflict.
- Plan, construct and deliver to the country the National Museum of Memory as a place that dignifies the victims and promotes a culture respectful of human rights.

== Reports published ==
=== 2008 ===
- Trujillo: A tragedy that Never Ceases

=== 2009 ===
- El Salado: That War was not Ours
- Memories in Wartime
- Toolbox: Recall and Narrate the Conflict

=== 2010 ===
- Bojayá: War Without Limits
- La Rochela: Memoirs of a Crime Against Justice
- The Bahía Portete Massacre: Wayuu Women in the Spotlight
- The Disputed Land
- Memories of Dispossession and Peasant Resistance in the Caribbean Coast (1960 - 2010)

=== 2011 ===
- Women and War: Victims and Resistance in the Colombian Caribbean
- Women Who Make History: Earth, Body and Policy in the Colombian Caribbean
- San Carlos: Memories of Exodus in War
- The Invisible Footprint of War: Forced Displacement in the Comuna 13
- The Unarmed Order. The resistance of the Workers' Association Peasants of Carare
- To Silence Democracy. The Massacres of Remedios and Segovia 1982-1997
- El Tigre Massacre: Reconstruction of Historical Narrative in the Valle del Guaméz - Putumayo

=== 2012 ===
- El Placer: Women, Coca and War in the Bajo Putumayo
- “Our life has been our struggle”. Memory and Resistance in the Indigenous Cauca
- Justice and Peace: Judicial Truth or Historical Truth?
- Law of Justice and Peace: The Silences and the Forgetfulness of Truth
- Justice and Peace: Lands and Territories from the Paramilitary Perspective

=== 2013 ===
- “Basta Ya!” Colombia: Memories of War and Dignity. This document gives an account of 50 years of armed conflict in Colombia, revealing the enormous magnitude, ferocity and degradation of war and the serious consequences and impact on the civilian population.
- Guerrilla Forces and Civilian Population. Path of the FARC 1949 - 2013
- A Kidnapped Society
- Agrarian Policies and Land Reform in Colombia: Sketch of an Institutional Memory
- Challenges for Reintegration: Approaches to Gender, Age and Ethnicity

=== 2014 ===
- Remember to Repair. The Massacres of Matal of Flor Amarillo and Corocito in Arauca
- Archive of grave violations to Human Rights. Elements for Public Policy
- Masters and Farmers: Land, Power, Violence in Valle del Cauca
- Putumayo: The Maelstrom of Rubber Plantations
- Notebook of Damages Caused by the Violence
- Truth Agreements Directorate (TAD) Reports
- New Scenarios of Armed Conflict and Violence. Panorama of post-agreements with Paramilitaries of Caribe Region, Department of Antioquia and Department of Choco
- New Scenarios of Armed Conflict and Violence. Panorama of post-agreements with Paramilitaries of Northeast and Middle Magdalena, Eastern Plains, Southeast and Bogota
- Make War and Kill Politics
- Enforced Disappearance

=== 2015 ===
- Overview I contributed to the truth
- Annihilate the difference
- The legacy of the absent. Leaders and important people in the history of El Salado
- The word and silence
- A journey through the historical memory
- Disarmament, demobilization and reintegration
- Del ñame espino al calabazo
- Series: A displaced nation
  - A displaced nation. National report of the displacement in Colombia
  - Razed villages. Memories of the displacement in El Castillo (Meta)
  - Licensed to move: Massacres and reconfiguration territorial in Tibú, Catatumbo
  - Crossing the border: Memories of the exodus towards Venezuela. The case of the Arauca River
- Primer: Criminal law and war
- Quintín Lame: first indigenous guerrilla of Latin America
- Roads for memory
- Toolbox for Managers of Human Rights Archives
- Buenaventura: A Port Without Community
- Corporal Texts of Cruelty: Historical Memory and Forensic Anthropology
- Narratives of Life and Memory
- Memory, Territory and Peasant Struggles
- Lucho Arango: The Advocate of Artisanal Fishing
- That Day the Violence Arrived by Canoe…
- Historical Memory from the Territorial Sphere
- Communicate During the Conflict, Memoires of Eduardo Estrada

=== 2016 ===
- Crimes that do not prescribe
- Petroleum, coca, territorial dispossession and social organization in Putumayo
- Pogue: the memory made of songs
- Social cleansing. Limpieza social. Una violencia mal nombrada (Spanish)
- Right to justice as a guarantee of non-repetition
- Memories of a forgotten massacre
- La maldita tierra (Spanish)
- La justicia demanda memoria (Spanish)
- Esa mina llevaba mi nombre (Spanish)
- Land and rural conflicts
- Granada. Memories of war, resistance and reconstruction
- Until you find them. The drama of enforced disappearance in Colombia
- Cartillas: Desde el Carare, la niñez y la juventud siembra cultura de paz (Spanish)

=== 2017 ===
- The hidden war: landmines and explosive remnants in Colombia
- Grupos armados posdesmovilización (Spanish) - Armed groups that emerged after the demobilization
- Architecture, memory and reconciliation
- Tomas y ataques guerrilleros (1965 - 2013) (Spanish) - (1965-2013) guerrilla attacks
- Herramienta Metodológica del Monumento Sonoro por la Memoria (Spanish)
- Travesía por la memoria: Ruta metodológica para la reconstrucción de memoria histórica con niños, niñas y adolescentes (Spanish) - Journey through memory: Methodological path for the reconstruction of historical memory with children and adolescents

== See Also ==
- Government entities of Colombia
