= Arelis Uriana =

Wayuu Colombian indigenous leader and politician (born 1976)

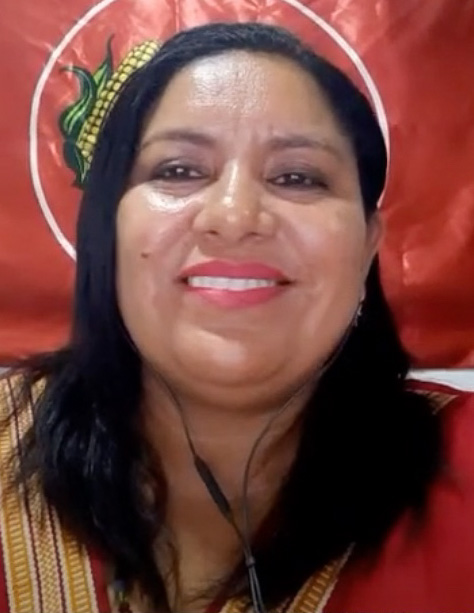
- Arelis Uriana in 2021
- Born: February 24, 1976 (age 50); Resguardo Indígena de Mayabangloma, Fonseca, La Guajira, Colombia

Arelis María Uriana Guariyú (born 24 February 1976) is a Wayuu Colombian politician and indigenous leader. She was the first indigenous woman to run for President of Colombia as a pre-candidate for the Historic Pact for Colombia coalition in 2022, representing the Movimiento Alternativo Indígena y Social (MAIS).

== Career ==
Uriana was born on 24 February 1976 in Resguardo Indígena de Mayabangloma, Fonseca, La Guajira, Colombia in a Wayuu family. In that community, she had to do farm work from a young age and received part of her primary education there, where nuns taught classes under the trees. She attended high school in Fonseca, but failed her first year because she had to walk more than an hour to get there and couldn't make it to class on time. Soon Uriana joined the National Indigenous Organization of Colombia (ONIC), where earned diplomas in secretarial studies and administration.

She was a trainer at the National Indigenous Training School (EFIN) of the ONIC between 2007 and 2011. Between 2012 and 2016, she was an advisor to the ONIC's Council for Women, Family, and Generation and from 2015 to 2018 she was coordinator of the Continental Network of Indigenous Women of the Americas (ECMIA).

Uriana became the first indigenous woman member of the MAIS candidacy for the 2018 parliamentary election, in which she obtained 16,495 votes.

In 2021 became the first indigenous woman to run for President of Colombia as a pre-candidate for the Historic Pact for Colombia coalition in thee 2022 presidential election, representing the Movimiento Alternativo Indígena y Social (MAIS). Her political activism focuses on the fight against racial and gender discrimination, the dignity of Colombia's indigenous peoples as a priority issue for the state, environmental protection and the political role of women. In the results of the 2022 primaries for the Historic Pact for Colombia, she came in fourth place with 54,541 votes (0.98%).

== Personal life ==
She married a Wayuu man at the age of 19 with whom she had six children.
