= Gustavo Petro 2018 presidential campaign =

Colombian political campaign

Gustavo Petro presidential campaign, 2018
- Campaigned for: 2018 Colombian presidential election
- Candidate: Gustavo Petro; Mayor of Bogotá (2012–2014); Ángela Robledo; Member Chamber of Representatives
- Affiliation: Humane Colombia
- Status: Announced: 3 March 2017; Presumptive nominee: 12 March 2017; Official nominee: 22 July 2018; Qualified for run-off: 7 October 2018; Won the election: 20 October 2018
- Receipts: COP 4.150.097,17
- Website: www.gustavopetro.com.co

The 2018 presidential campaign of Gustavo Petro in 2018, Gustavo Petro was again a presidential candidate, this time getting the second best result in voting counting in the first round on 27 May, and advanced to the second round. His campaign was run by publicists Ángel Beccassino, Alberto Cienfuegos and Luis Fernando Pardo. A lawsuit was filed by citizens against Iván Duque, Petro's right-wing opponent, alleging bribery and fraud. The news chain Wradio made the lawsuit public on 11 July, which was presented to the CNE ('Consejo Nacional Electoral', National Electoral Council, by its acronym in Spanish). The state of the lawsuit will be defined by the Magistrado Alberto Yepes.

Petro's platform emphasized support for universal health care, public banking, a rejection of proposals to expand fracking and mining in favor of investing in clean energy, and land reform. Before the runoff, Petro received endorsements from senator-elect Antanas Mockus and senator Claudia López Hernández, both members of the Green Alliance.

In the second round of voting, Duque won the election with more than 10 million votes, while Petro took second place with 8 million votes. Duque was inaugurated on 7 August; meanwhile, Petro returned to the Senate. He served until the inauguration of a new congress in 2022.

Petro received death threats from the paramilitary group Águilas Negras.

== Presidential ticket ==
Humane Colombia ticket, 2018
Gustavo Petro	Ángela Robledo
for President	for Vice President
Mayor of Bogotá (2012–2014)	Member of Chamber of Representatives (2010-2018)

== Campaign background ==
The economist Gustavo Petro of Humane Colombia, a former mayor of Bogotá and former M-19 guerilla who was previously a candidate in the 2010 presidential election, ran a populist campaign focusing on decreasing inequality and tackling climate change. Supported by a coalition of left and centre-left parties, Petro also emphasised workers' rights and campaigned to improve labour conditions in both urban and rural areas. He aimed to reduce poverty by implementing land reforms and establishing a "popular bank" that would offer loans to impoverished citizens. Petro supported the introduction of state-funded universal healthcare that would replace the unpopular private-funded system. Furthermore, he sought to restrict the use of fossil fuels and intended to ban any further exploration of mining and fracking in favour of renewable energy sources. Several months before the election, Petro survived an assassination attempt when a bullet pierced through his armoured van. He presented himself as a successor to prominent slain left-wing politicians such as Jorge Eliecer Gaitan and Luis Carlos Galán. Petro furthermore highlighted the need to end political persecution in the country. Petro's opponents claimed that he would "turn Colombia into another Venezuela", citing his prior support for former Venezuelan president Hugo Chávez. Critics said his policy proposals would not attract foreign investment and that his plans to abandon non-renewable energy, which accounted for 2-4% of Colombia's GDP, were not feasible at the time. Opponents also claimed that his policies would result in an economic disaster.

== Party representation ==
- Humane Colombia

== See also ==
- Presidency of Gustavo Petro
- 2018 Colombian presidential election
- Gustavo Petro 2022 presidential campaign
- Gustavo Petro 2010 presidential campaign
