= Carlos Amaya =

Colombian politician (born 1984)

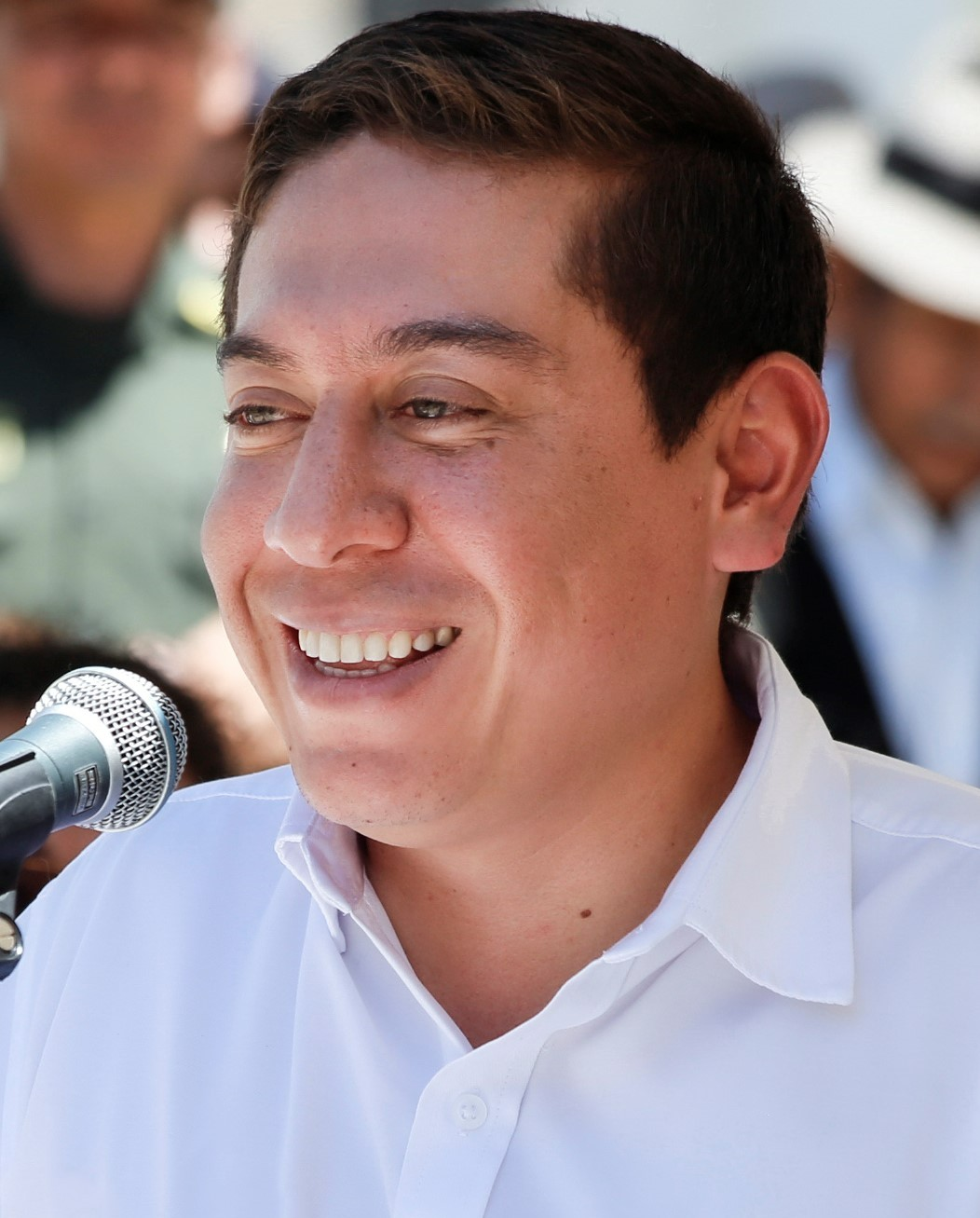
- Amaya in 2017

Governor of Boyacá
- Incumbent
- Assumed office 1 January 2024
- Preceded by: Ramiro Barragán Adame
- In office 1 January 2016 – 31 December 2019
- Preceded by: Juan Carlos Granados
- Succeeded by: Ramiro Barragán Adame

Personal details
- Born: 17 September 1984 (age 41)
- Party: Green Alliance

Carlos Andrés Amaya Rodríguez (born 17 September 1984) is a Colombian politician. He has served as governor of Boyacá since 2024, having previously served from 2016 to 2019. From 2010 to 2014, he was a member of the Chamber of Representatives.
