= Carmen Ramírez Boscán =

Colombian activist and politician (born 1982)

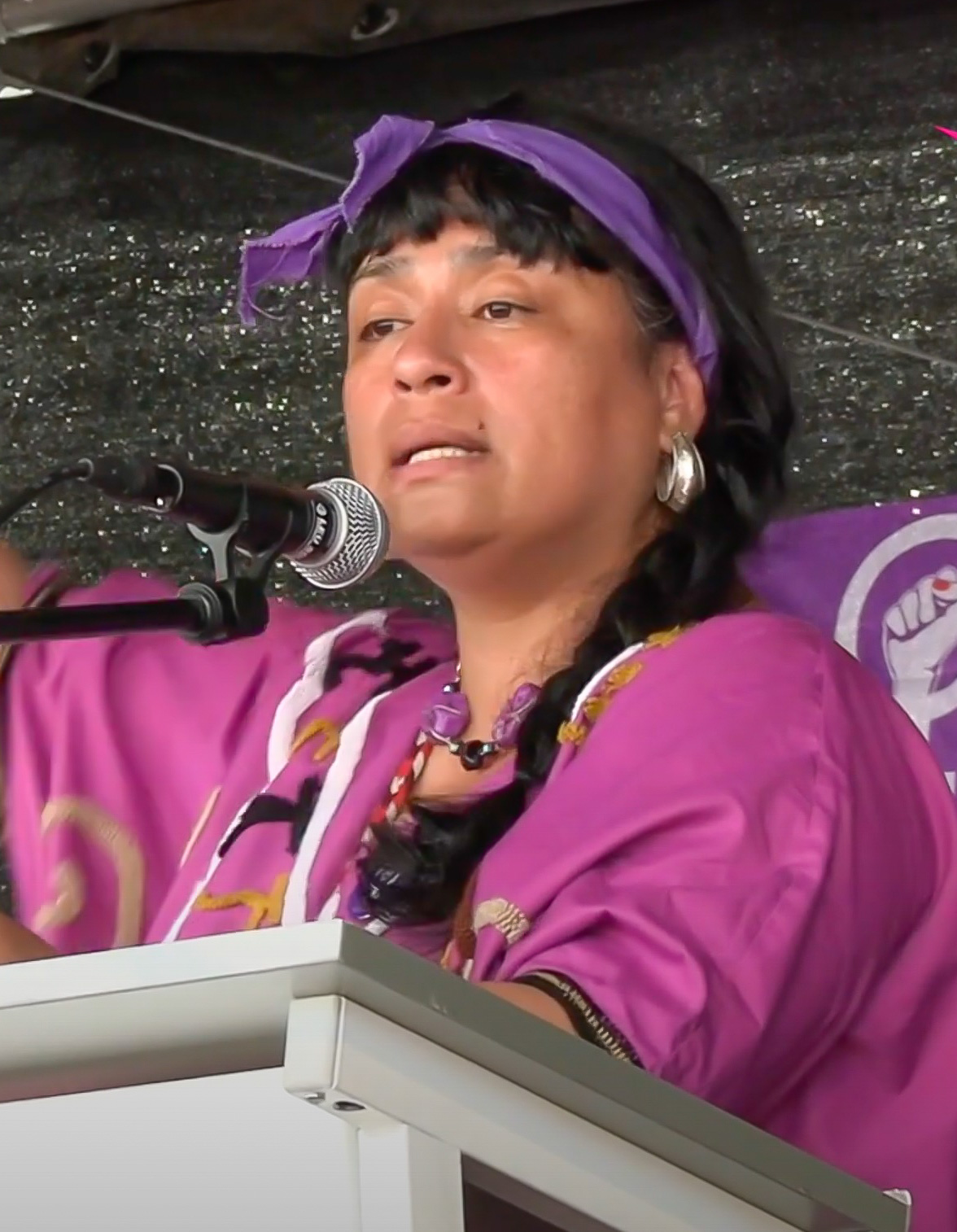
- Ramírez in 2019

Member of the Chamber of Representatives of Colombia
- Incumbent
- Assumed office 20 July 2022
- Constituency: Colombians Abroard

Personal details
- Born: 1982 (age 43–44) Maicao, La Guajira Department, Colombia
- Party: Humane Colombia

Carmen Felisa Ramírez Boscán (sometimes spelled Karmen; Born 1982), also known by her indigenous name Wayúnkerra Epinayú, is a Colombian human rights activist and politician. A member of the Wayuu people, she first became known for leading the Wayuu Women's Force, which denounced paramilitary violence against indigenous groups, following the murders of several members of her family. Ramírez later additionally began campaigning against mining in traditional Wayuu lands, which led to her receiving death threats and ultimately forced Colombia in 2009. Since 2022, she has been a member of the Chamber of Representatives of Colombia, representing Colombians living abroad.

== Early life and education ==
Ramírez was born in 1982 in Maicao, a city in La Guajira Department in northern Colombia. She is a member of the Wayuu people, a group indigenous to the Guajira Peninsula in Colombia and Venezuela. After completing her education, Ramírez moved to Bogotá in the early 2000s to study graphic design.

== Activism ==
While Ramírez was at university in Bogotá, her grandfather, uncle, and two of her cousins were murdered by paramilitary groups in La Guajira. She subsequently returned to Maicao to seek justice for their deaths. In 2006, Ramírez founded the Wayuu Women's Force (Spanish: Fuerza de Mujeres Wayuu), consisting primarily of Wayuu women publicly denouncing abuses carried out by paramilitary groups. Among its first members were survivors of the 2004 Bahía Portete massacre. The organisation draws on traditional Wayuu beliefs, including the role of women in resolving conflicts, and the principles of solidarity and reciprocity with non-Wayuu (Wayuu: Alijuna) people.

In addition to her peace work, Ramírez also became an environmentalist, campaigning against corporate interests in ancestral Wayuu lands in La Guajira. In 2007, she published the book Desde el Desierto (lit. 'From the Desert'), in which she documented paramilitary violence against Wayuu people, as well as the negative impact of mining on biodiversity and indigenous communities in La Guajira.

In 2009, Ramírez fled Colombia after receiving death threats, settling in Geneva, Switzerland, where she subsequently married. In Switzerland, she established the website Lucify.ch, which aimed to support and empower migrant women living in the country. Ramírez went on to work as a consultant for organisations including the International Labour Organisation, the United Nations Institute for Training and Research, and the Office of the United Nations High Commissioner for Human Rights.

In 2013, Ramírez became a member of the Committee on the Elimination of All Forms of Discrimination Against Women, publishing a report on the rights of indigenous women in Colombia. Additionally, she launched the committee's training course on indigenous women, CEDAW Indigena. That same year, Ramírez was recognised by the Global Fund for Women at its 25th anniversary gala in San Francisco, United States, for her work advocating for indigenous women in Latin America.

== Political career ==
In 2022, Ramírez was named as the Historic Pact for Colombia and Humane Colombia candidate for the international constituency representing Colombians living abroad in the Chamber of Representatives. During the election, Ramírez received 37, 220 votes, defeating the incumbent Democratic Centre candidate; she started in the role in July 2022. In 2026, as part of her role, Ramírez publicly called for Alligator Alcatraz, an immigration detention facility in Florida containing many Colombian detainees, to close, citing its "overcrowded and dangerous conditions".
