= Bahía Portete massacre =

Killing of 12 people in Colombia in 2004

- Bahía Portete massacre (Colombia)
- Location: Bahía Portete (municipality of Uribia), La Guajira, Colombia
- Date: 16 April 2004
- Target: Wayuu family
- Attack type: shooting, mass murder, massacre
- Weapon: small arms
- Deaths: 12
- Perpetrator: AUC: Wayuu Counter-Insurgency Bloc

The Bahía Portete massacre (Spanish: Masacre de Bahia Portete) was a massacre in the Colombian town of Bahía Portete (municipality of Uribia), in the Department of La Guajira on April 16, 2004. It was perpetrated by paramilitary groups of the United Self-Defense Forces of Colombia (AUC) Wayuu Counter-Insurgency Bloc led by alias "Jorge 40" killing 12 people and the disappearance of one. Some 600 people were displaced against their will and took refuge in neighboring Venezuela.

Jorge 40's men, alias "Pablo" and "Chema Bola" shot the Indigenous group in Bahia Portete after receiving reports that these were "kidnapping and robbing" in the region. Five member of the Fince-Epinayú family were assassinated, accused of kidnapping a Lebanese immigrant.

The Spanish newspaper El Mundo reported in 2004 that the motives were rivalries, aroused between paramilitary factions between "Jorge 40" and another paramilitary commander known as "Chema Balas" for the control of the port of Bahía Portete. Calculated the death of 30 members of the Wayuu executed, 60 disappeared and some 250 forcibly displaced into Venezuela. Paramilitaries pertaining to the AUC demobilized in 2006, but new drug trafficking organizations arose, such as the Aguilas Negras. Between 2000 and 2005 the FARC and the AUC perpetrated two massacres each while the ELN perpetrated one in the Department of La Guajira.

Débora Barros, who lost several family members in the massacre, went on to become an indigenous leader within the Colombian peace process. Carmen Ramírez Boscán established the Wayuu Women's Force in response to violence against indigenous peoples, including victims of the massacre.

== See also ==
- The Return (2013 film) by filmmaker Patricia Ortega (Maracaibo, Venezuela) based on the Massacre in Bahía Portete- available at YouTube.com: https://www.youtube.com/watch?v=tAjsmjkJsC8&t=27s
- List of massacres in Colombia
