= Camilo Romero (politician) =

Colombian politician (born 1976)

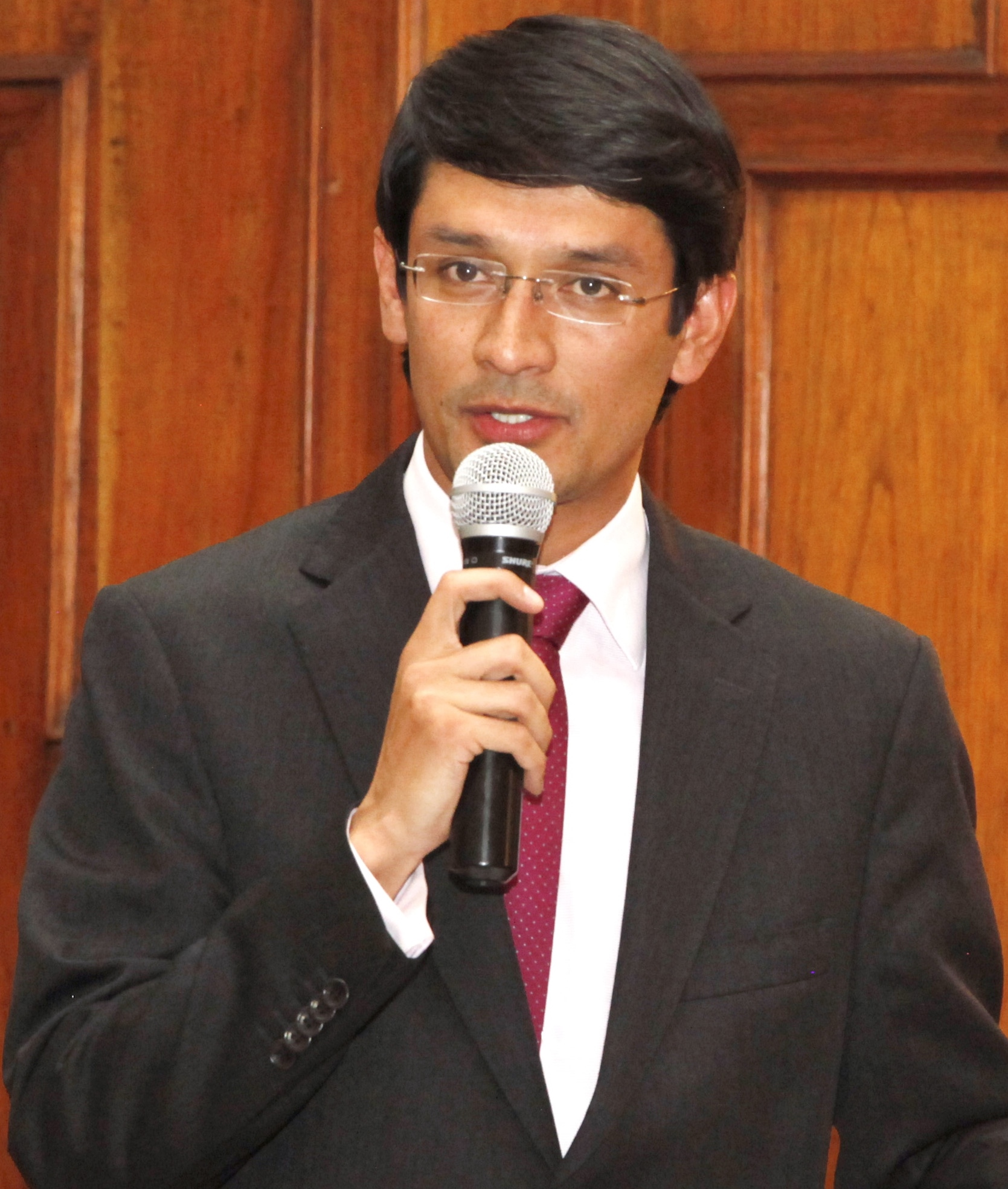

Ambassador of Colombia to Argentina
- In office September 13, 2022 – August 7, 2026
- President: Gustavo Petro
- Preceded by: Álvaro Pava Camelo

Governor of Nariño
- In office January 1, 2016 – December 31, 2019
- Preceded by: Raúl Delgado
- Succeeded by: John Alexander Rojas

Senator of Colombia
- In office July 20, 2010 – July 20, 2014

Personal details
- Born: Camilo Ernesto Romero Galeano; July 17, 1976 (age 50) Ipiales, Nariño, Colombia
- Party: Green Alliance (Since 2012)
- Other political affiliations: Democratic Pole (Until 2012)
- Website: House website

Camilo Ernesto Romero Galeano (born July 17, 1976) is a Colombian journalist and politician who served as Governor of Nariño from 2016 to 2019. A member of the Green Alliance, Romero was an unsuccessful candidate in the 2022 Colombian presidential election, losing the Historic Pact for Colombia primary to Gustavo Petro.

== Early life and education ==
Romero was born in Ipiales, Nariño on July 17, 1976. He is the son of politician Ricardo Romero Sánchez and the nephew of political leader Heraldo Romero Sánchez. Romero studied journalism at the Universidad Autónoma de Occidente.

== Career ==
Romero participated in the creation of Telesur in 2005, later become the station's lead correspondent in Colombia. In 2008, Romero helped form the Vamos Independientes political collective associated with the Alternative Democratic Pole.

In the 2010 parliamentary elections, Romero was elected to the Senate of Colombia. In the 2014 presidential election, Romero ran in the Green Alliance presidential primary, but lost the nomination to former Mayor of Bogota Enrique Peñalosa.

In the 2015 regional election, Romero was elected Governor of Nariño with the support of the Somos Nariño coalition. His candidacy was supported by the Green Alliance and the Indigenous Authorities of Colombia (AICO) party. Romero mounted another presidential run in 2022, but lost the Historic Pact for Colombia primary to Gustavo Petro.

Diplomatic posts
Preceded by Álvaro Pava Camelo	Colombian Ambassador to Argentina; 2022–2026	Incumbent
Party political offices
Preceded by No nomination	Green Alliance nominee for President of Colombia; 2022-2026	Most recent
Political offices
Preceded by Raúl Delgado	Governor of Nariño; 2016–2019	Succeeded by John Alexander Rojas
