= Wayuu people =

Ethnic group indigenous to the Guajira Peninsula

Wayuu
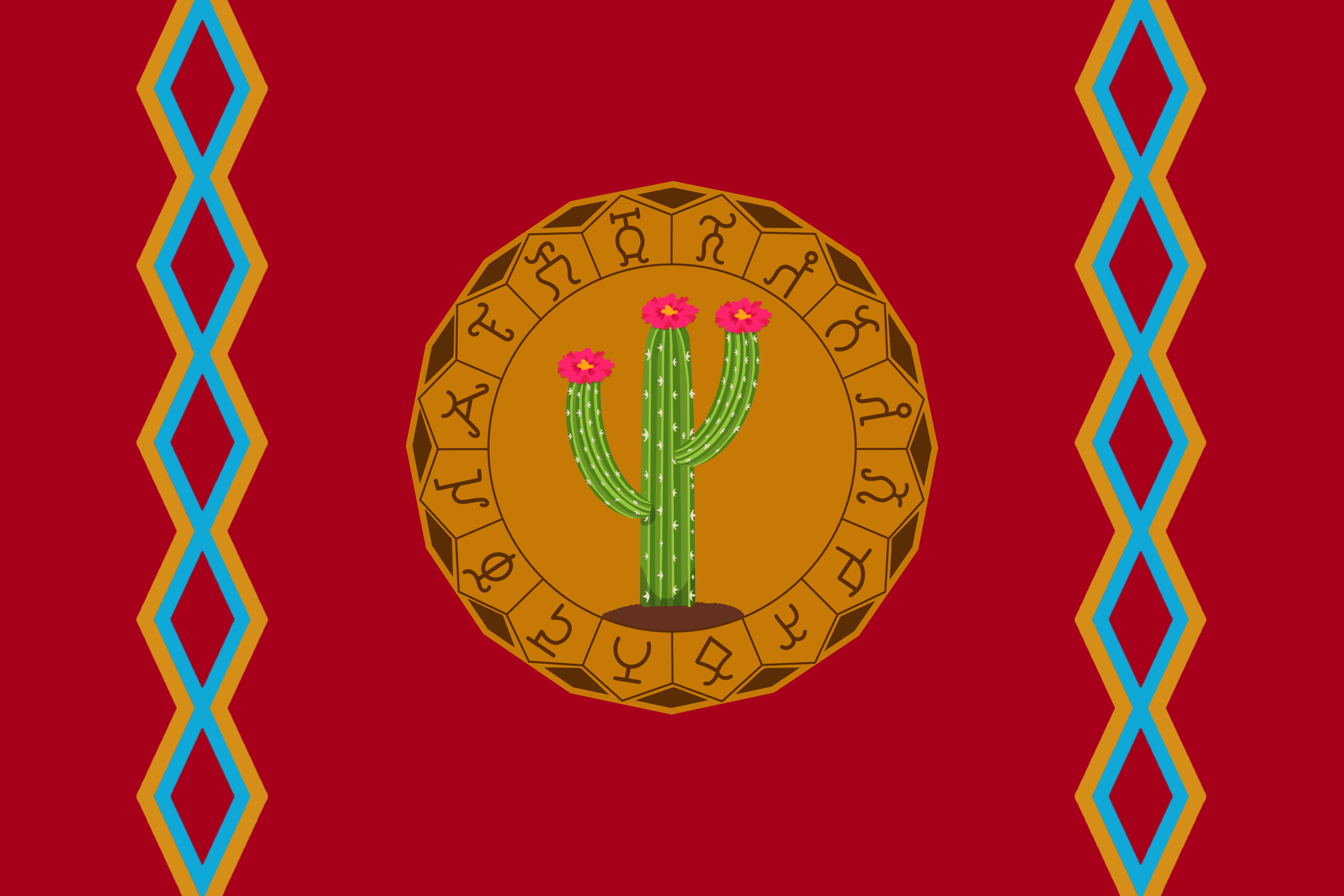

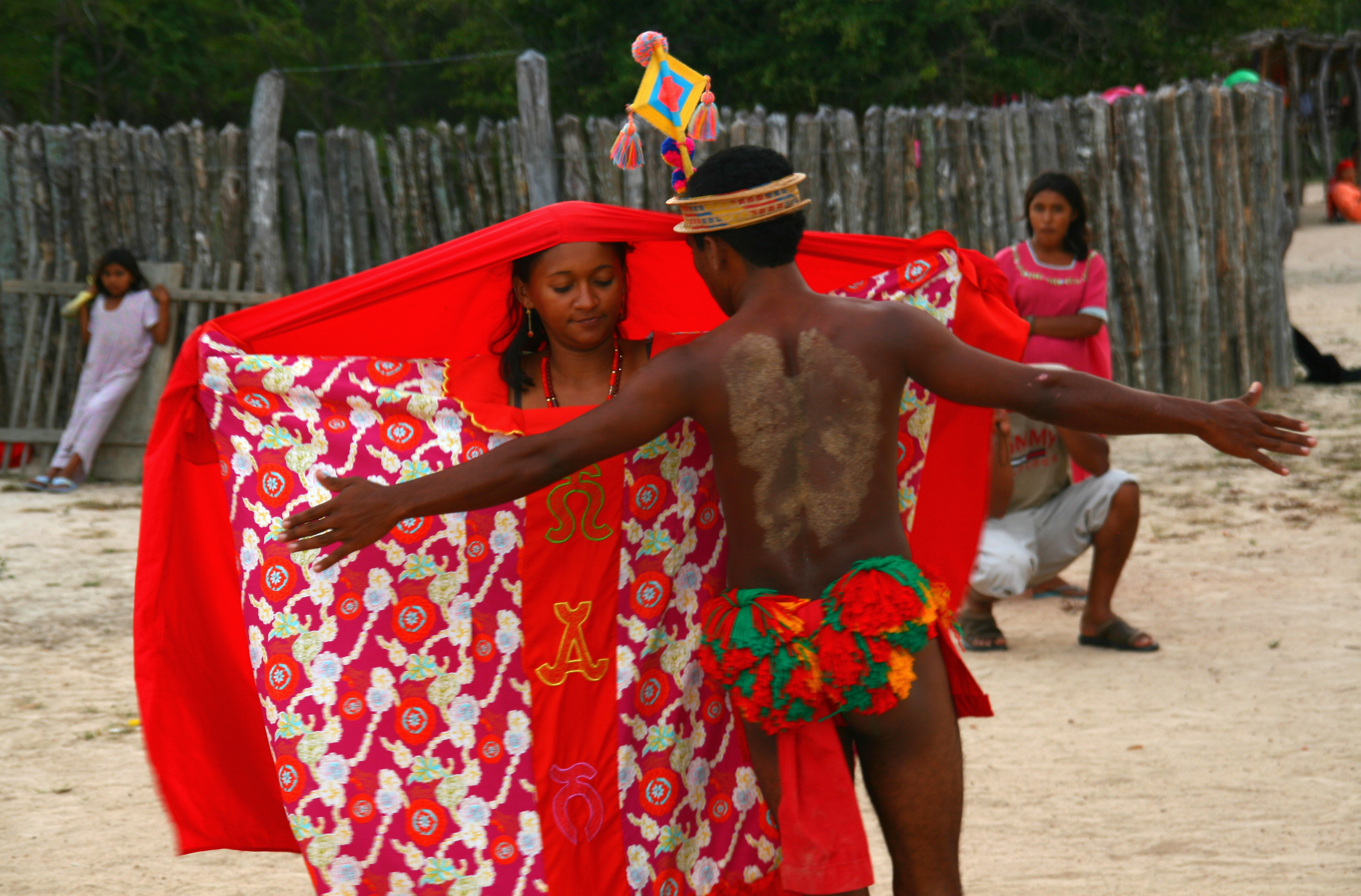
- Wayú people engaged in a courtship dance

Total population
- Approx. 413,437 in Venezuela (2011 Census); Approx. 380,460 in Colombia (2018 Census)

Regions with significant populations
- Guajira Peninsula; Colombia and Venezuela

Languages
- Wayuu, Spanish

Religion
- Traditional, Roman Catholicism

Related ethnic groups
- Other Arawakan peoples, especially other Ta-Arawakan peoples

- People: Wayuu
- Language: Wayuunaiki
- Country: Wajiira

The Wayuu (also Wayu, Wayú, Guajiro, Wahiro) are an indigenous ethnic group native to the Guajira Peninsula in northern Colombia and northwest Venezuela. The Wayuu language is part of the Arawakan language family. Throughout their history, they have resisted the Spanish, rural land owners, and the Catholic Church. Wayuu tradition remains, and their artisan industry is one of the biggest handicraft exports in present-day Colombia.

== Geography ==
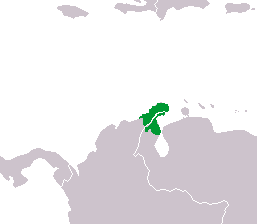
Area inhabited by the Wayuu, between Colombia and Venezuela

The Wayuu inhabit the arid Guajira Peninsula straddling the Venezuela-Colombia border, on the Caribbean Sea coast. Two major rivers flow through this mostly harsh environment: the Ranchería River in Colombia and the El Limón River in Venezuela, representing the main sources of water. They are accompanied by artificial ponds designed to hold rainwater during the rain season.

The territory has equatorial weather seasons: a rainy season from September to December, which they call Juyapu; a dry season, known by them as Jemial, from December to April; a second rainy season called Iwa from April to May; and a second dry season from May to September.

== History ==
=== Guajira rebellion ===
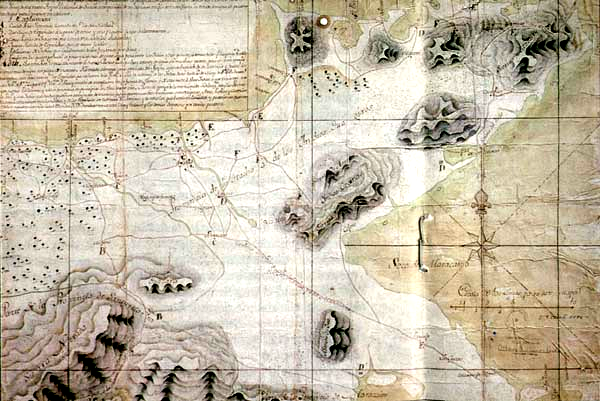
Map of La Guajira in 1769

Although the Wayuu were never subjugated by the Spanish, the two groups were in a more or less permanent state of war. There were rebellions in 1701 (when they destroyed a Capuchin mission), 1727 (when more than 2,000 natives attacked the Spanish), 1741, 1757, 1761 and 1768. In 1718, Governor Soto de Herrera called them "barbarians, horse thieves, worthy of death, without God, without law and without a king". Of all the Indigenous peoples in the territory of Colombia, they were unique in having learned the use of firearms and horses.

In 1769, the Spanish captured 22 Wayuus in order to put them to work building the fortifications of Cartagena. In reaction, on May 2, 1769, at El Rincón, near Río de la Hacha, Wayuu set the village on fire, burning the church and two Spaniards who had taken refuge in it. They also captured the priest. The Spanish immediately dispatched an expedition from El Rincón to capture the Wayuu. This force was led by José Antonio de Sierra, a mestizo who had also led the party that captured the 22 Guajiro. They recognized him and forced his party to take refuge in the house of the curate, which they then set afire. Sierra and eight of his men were killed.

This success was soon known in other Guajiro areas, and more men joined the revolt. According to Messía, at the peak there were 20,000 Wayuu under arms. Many had firearms acquired from English and Dutch smugglers, sometimes even from the Spanish. These enabled the rebels to take nearly all the settlements of the region, which they burned. According to the authorities, more than 100 Spaniards were killed and many others taken prisoner. Many cattle were also taken by the rebels. The Spaniards who could took refuge in Río de la Hacha and sent urgent messages to Maracaibo, Valle de Upar, Santa Marta and Cartagena. Cartagena sent 100 troops. The rebels themselves were not unified. Sierra's relatives among the Wayuu took up arms against the rebels to avenge his death. The two groups of natives fought at La Soledad. That and the arrival of Spanish reinforcements caused the rebellion to fade, but not before the Guajiro had regained much territory.

=== Coerced labor ===
In many rural areas in colonial Venezuela, abuses – and in most cases – debt peonage of the Wayuu grew rampant, even after the 1542 New Laws' prohibition on indigenous slavery in Spanish colonial territories.

In 1771, a Spanish force sent from Cartagena to quash the Indigenous insurgency in the Guajira Peninsula, and what they found was a fearsome army with British guns. On top of having connections with both British and Dutch merchants, Wayuu people would trade pearls and brazilwood to these merchants in return for contraband slaves. In fact, Wayuu chiefs Pablo Majusares and Toribio Caporinche both owned eight African slaves. Until Venezuelan independence was to be official, the Wayuu remained a constant threat and remained autonomous from the Spanish, with kidnappings occurring from both sides occasionally. When questioned about laws that had already been put into place regarding Indigenous abuse in Spanish territory, Spanish officers would reply to concerns for using captives as slaves as "just," claiming that belligerence allows for compensation.

Venezuelan independence was declared in 1811 but not fully achieved until 1821 when Simón Bolívar led the Venezuelan War of Independence. The removal of debt peonage in Venezuela did not officially end until 1854, when President José Gregorio Monagas (1851–1855) promised land owners compensation for the release of their so-called "unvaluable" workers growing in age.

From 1880 to 1936, local areas were able to continue to exploit Indigenous workers, as the Venezuelan government maintained most of their focus on the main cities. The oral tradition of the Wayuu people suggests that getting tricked into coerced labor happened frequently. Wayuu people increasingly sought to engage in the wage labor economy, and were offered free transportation to other settlements for wage labor, only to be taken to settlements for unpaid work. There are also indications in which local Venezuelan officials ordered villages of the Wayuu to be raided, where the people would be captured. Afro-descendants were brought in from countries like Cuba, for many land owners felt as though they needed more workers, and there was not a huge supply in Wayuu captives. With the hacienda system still continuing to be an issue, and with Venezuela's land being mainly farmland, captives were usually sent to work agriculture.

Resistance varied regionally based on the amount of control the land owners had on their workers. This resistance was caused by the unification of aspirations of Wayuu and Afro-Venezuelan workers. Forms of resistance came in the shape of fleeing, petitioning to local governments, or asking foreign countries for help, Columbia being a huge example. When fleeing, many Wayuu people did not know the geography, which in most cases resulted in the escapees being lost. At that point, they would either die from disease or hunger, or be re-captured by their land owners. Collective petitions saw success in some areas, even though in most cases only individual Wayuu people were freed, with the rest of the Afro-Venezuelans and other Wayuu's remaining captured. This control slowly dissipated over time, especially after the death of ruler Juan Vicente Gómez (1908–1935).

In 1936, General Eleazar López Contreras (1935–1941), Gómez's successor, sent government officials to rural regions to stop debt peonage from occurring to both Afro-Venezuelan and Wayuu people. While coerced labor concerning Indigenous people would not end until the 1950s in Venezuela, dependence on coerced Guajiro labor declined from 1936 onward.

=== Evangelization process ===
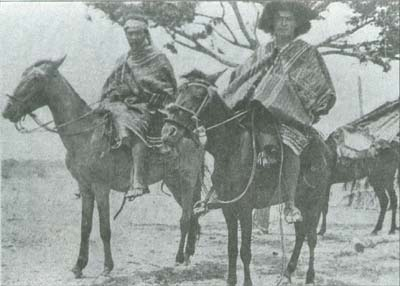
Wayuu riding on horses, 1928

The process of evangelization of the Wayuu people restarted in 1887 with the return of the Capuchin friars under reverend friar José María de Valdeviejas. In 1905, Pope Pius X created the Vicariate of La Guajira with Friar Atanasio Vicente Soler y Royo as the first vicar, in an attempt to "civilize" the Wayuu people.

In 1903, the Capuchin friars began building orphanages for Wayuu children, beginning with the La Sierrita orphanage, built in the Sierra Nevada de Santa Marta mountains, followed by the San Antonio orphanage, located by the Calancala River, in 1910, and the Nazareth orphanage in the Serrania de Macuira mountains in 1913, The orphanages had influence over the rancherías of Guarrachal, El Pájaro, Carazúa, Guaraguao, Murumana, Garra Patamana, and Karraipía, with Nazareth exerting some control over the rancherias of Taroa, Maguaipa, Guaseipá and Alpanapause. The friars constantly visited the settlements inviting the Wayuu to attend mass. Wayuu children in the orphanage were educated with traditional European customs. Conflicts between the Wayuu people and the Colombian government decreased since then.In 1942, the village of Uribia celebrated Christmas and New Year's Eve for the first time.

== Demographics ==
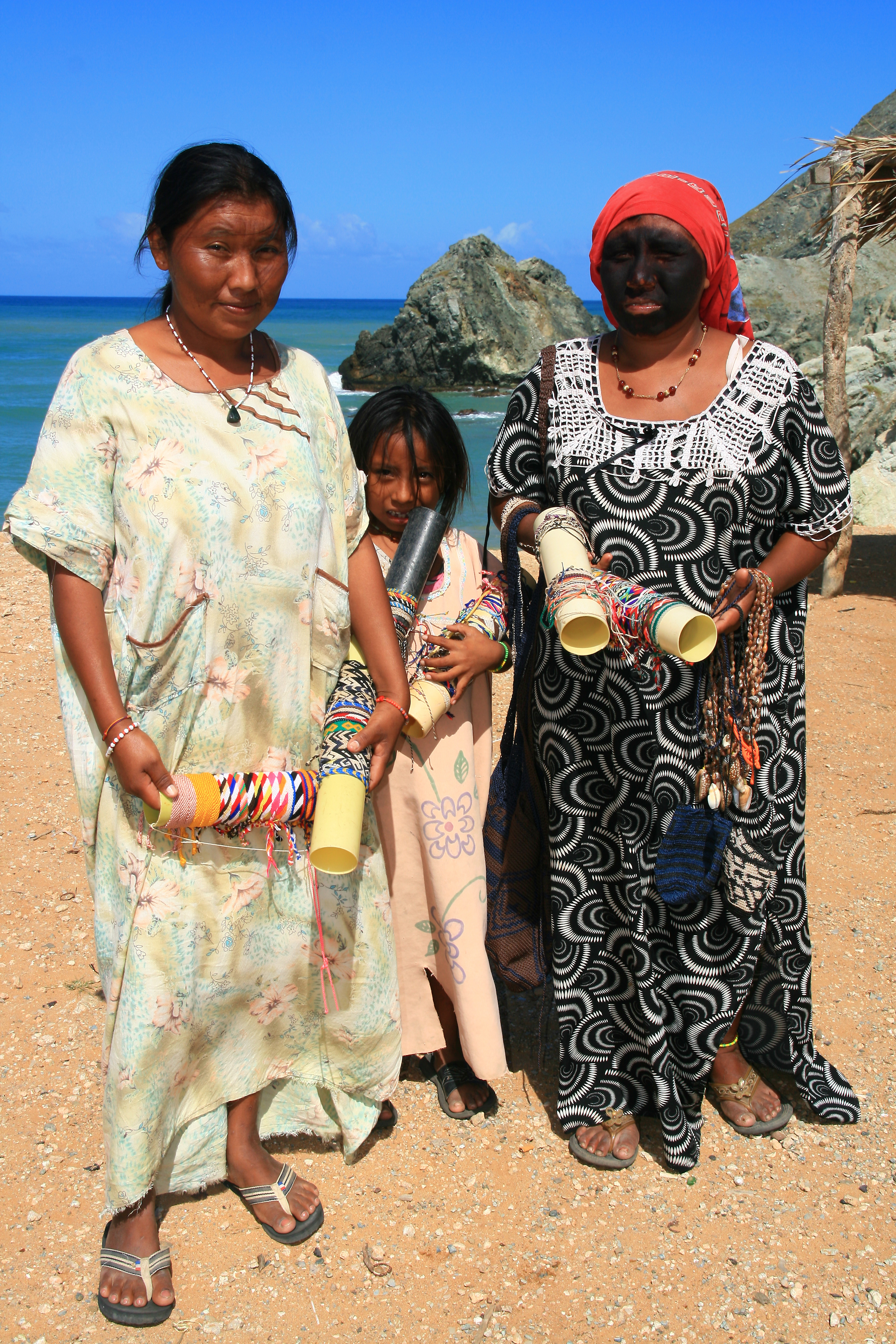
The Wayuu are the largest indigenous group in Colombia and in Venezuela.

According to a 1997 census in Colombia, the Wayuu population numbered approximately 144,003 – representing 20% of Colombia's total Amerindian population and 48% of the population of the Department of La Guajira. The Wayuu occupy a total area of 4,171 square miles (10,800 km^{2}) within approximately ten settlements, eight of which are located south of the Department (including a major one called Carraipia).

In Venezuela, the Wayuu population is estimated at 293,777, according to the 2001 census, with some 60,000 living in the city of Maracaibo. This makes the Wayuu the largest indigenous group in Venezuela, representing 57.5% of the Amerindian population.

Wayuu communities are not uniformly distributed within these territories, as their population is concentrated primarily in the outskirts of such settlements as Nazareth and Jala'ala, on the plains of Wopu'muin and Uribia, and within the municipalities of Maicao and Manaure, where population densities are some of the highest in the peninsula. This irregular distribution is intimately related to seasonal changes in weather – during the dry season, a significant proportion of the population crosses the border into Venezuela to work in the city of Maracaibo and its nearby settlements; once the rainy season begins, these Wayuu tend to return to their homes on the Colombian side.

The Wayuu people refer to themselves simply as "Wayuu" and do not acknowledge the term "Indian", preferring instead the term "people". They use the terms Kusina or "Indian" to refer to other ethnic indigenous groups, while using the term Alijuna (essentially meaning "the one who damages") to refer to outsiders or persons of European ancestry.

== Clans ==
Families in the Wayuu culture are divided into clans, some of which are:

CLAN	TERRITORY	TRANSLATION
Aapushana	Eirakajaule; Jasauwo´u; Kanakantui; Matuwolu´u; Sipano´u; Ushuwo´u watchulepu Wolu´u; Watkasainru´u; Polumolu´u; Shooliyuu-kanejeruu	Sour with something Land of the beach Intercalated; Forgotten; Land of si´iya Land of pans Away from the pulp round object Inside the heart of the Wolunka house Axe on the ground Hideouts
Epieyu	Lumoulein; Puuroulepu	Bushes where sleepiness is felt
Iipuana	Wo'upanalu'u; Puuroulepu	Close to the eyes For the birds
Jayaliyuu	Kalimiru´u; Aralietu´u; Uraichein; Mekijanao	Animal teeth to herd Little "curarire" Eyes without head
Jusayuu	Polujalii; Maraalu'u	Beware of the Axe; On top of the land
Pausayuu	Patsuarui; Paluwo'u	Frightened; Arrive at the sea
Sapuana	Tuikii; Waaleru	Fire; Inside you
Tijuana	Uchali´i; Oulemeru´u	Play; A lot
Uliana	Alainmapu; Chawaisu; Anuapa´a; Pusichipa´a; Kaijawou´u; Sekuolu´u; Uchaispa´a; Pulashu´ulia; Soulawo´u	All come together One on top of the other When it turns into a boat When it turns into a bat The teeth of our eyes Coming here Going there I have more power than you The one that saws
Uliyuu	Iisho´u	Of Cardinal
Uraliyuu	Aalasu; Paluuto´u	Passing by My eyes are of sticks
Ulewana	Iruwo´u	Olive face
Walepushana	Ishajiwo ´u Alapuolu ´u	Burned eyes Lying eyes
Walapuana	Atuairuku	Nurturing

== Language ==
The Wayuu language, called wayuunaiki, is part of the Arawak language family predominant in different parts of the Caribbean. There are small differences in dialect within the region of La Guajira: the northern, central or southern zones. Most of the younger generation speak Spanish fluently but understand the importance of preserving their traditional language.

To promote cultural integration and bilingual education among Wayuus and other Colombians, the Kamusuchiwo'u Ethno-educative Center, or Centro Etnoeducativo Kamusuchiwo'u, started an initiative to create the first illustrated Wayuunaiki-Spanish, Spanish-Wayuunaiki dictionary.

== Religion and society ==
The central figure of the Wayuu religion is Maleiwa (God) creator of everything, of the Wayuu and the founder of society. Pulowi and Juya, spiritual beings, like demigods, are a married couple associated with procreation and life, where Pulowi is the female figure related to the wind and dry seasons, and Juya the male, is a nomad and related to hunting who is seen as a powerful killer. Wanülu represents the evil spirit being of illness, and death.

Children are born at home, assisted by the mother-in-law or the nearest female relative. Priority is placed on the well-being of the child as women prefer to feed children first and follow strict diets when the survival of children is not assured.

Puberty is not very important among boys, but girls are exposed to rituals as early as 12 years old or when they start menstruating, requiring them to go through a period of seclusion for anywhere from two months up to two years. Girls are obliged to shave their heads and rest in a chinchorro or large hammock. During this period, Wayuu girls are taught how to be a wife in which a large part consists of cooking and learning the art of crocheting Wayuu bags. She is also fed with a special vegetarian diet called Jaguapi, and bathes frequently.

Women play important roles in the society, but it is not quite a matriarchal one. The Wayuu want their women to be wise and mature. Nearly all traditional marriages are arranged and accompanied by a dowry, which is given to the mother's brothers and uncles. Young girls are promised to men of the clan as young as 11 years old, around the time they are becoming of child-bearing age. The perceived intention is to wed her to a man before risking that pregnancy out of wedlock or arrangement, a cause of great social shame, specifically for the woman's family's honor and credibility. Men may have multiple wives (polygamy).

The Wayuu believe that the life cycle does not end with death, but that a relationship with one's bones continues. Burials are very important. The relatives of the dead act in a certain way: first, the body is buried with personal belongings; after five years, the bones are exhumed, put into ceramics or a chinchorro (hammock), and reburied in the clan's cemetery.

== Lifestyle ==
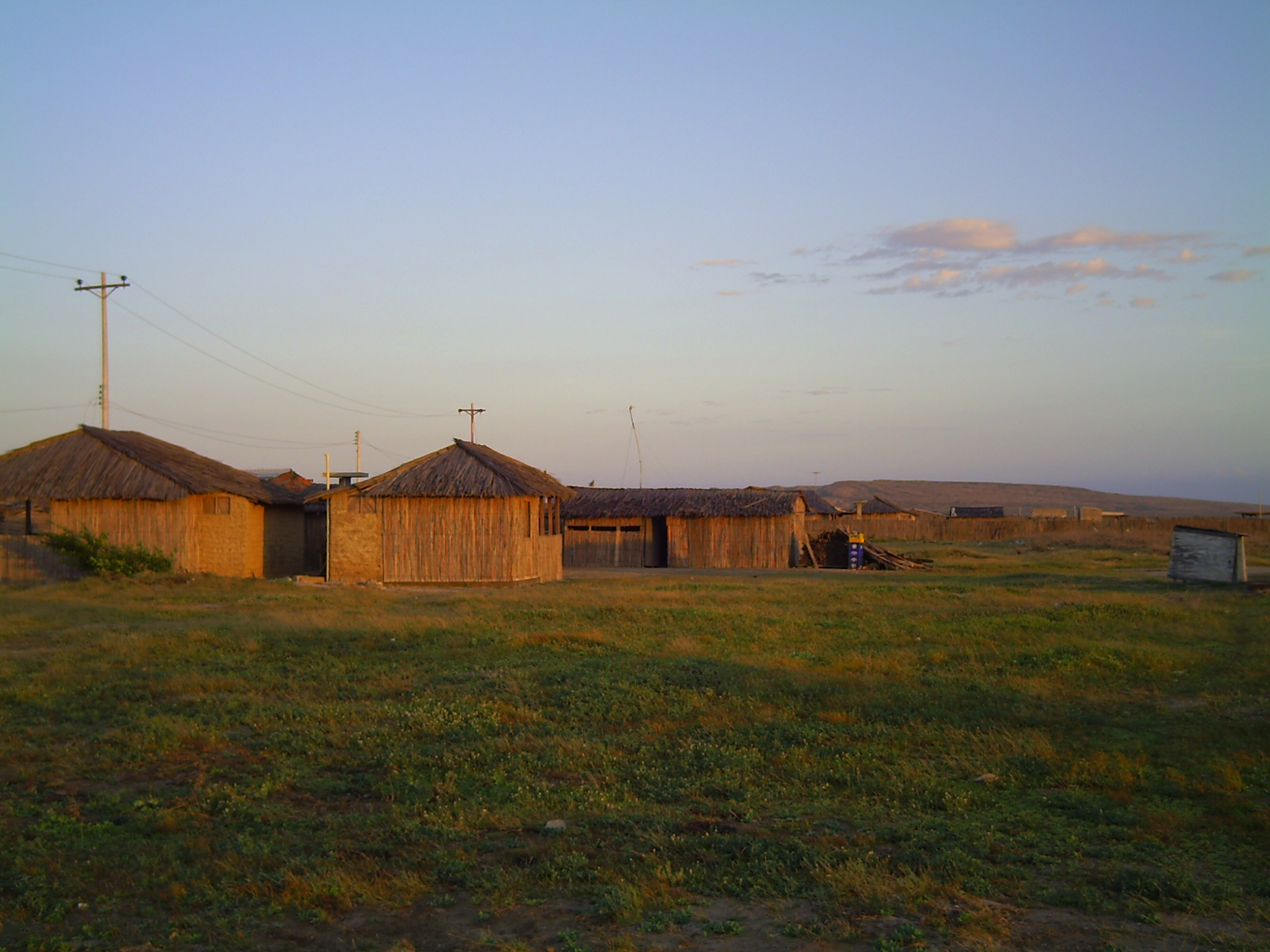
A Wayuu rancheria

A traditional Wayuu settlement is made up of five or six houses that made up caseríos or rancherías. Each ranchería is named after a plant, animal or geographic place. A territory that contains many rancherias is named after the mother's last name; that is, society is matrilineal. The Wayuu congregated in rancherias are usually isolated and far from each other to avoid mixing their goat herds.

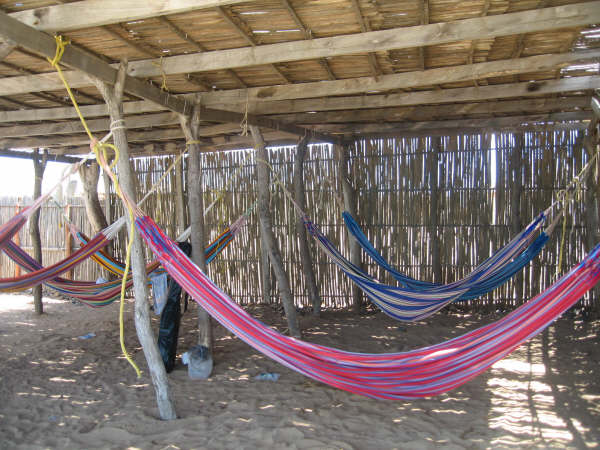
Typical Wayuu rectangular "day house" with hammocks by the Caribbean Sea.

The typical house is a small structure called a piichi or miichi, generally divided into two rooms with hammocks to sleep in and keep personal belongings such purses or mochilas of acrylic fiber and ceramics to keep water.

Wayuu culture is known for making Wayuu bags or mochilas. There are many styles of mochilas. A susu is a backpack typically 20–30 cm wide and 35 cm high, used to store personal and work items. Characteristic for the fabrics are the decorating patterns inspired by nature and what the culture sees around.

Living quarters are either rectangular or semi-circular. Close to the main house is a common area called a luma or enramada, similar to a living room but almost in the open. Built of six pillars with a flat roof, it is used for everyday duties and to attend to visitors and business activities. Family members hang their hammocks there for the noon nap.

Traditionally, the walls are made of yotojoro – a wattle and daub of mud, hay and dried canes, but some Wayuu now use more modern construction with cement and other materials. The preferred material for roofing and yotojoro wood is the dagger cactus (Stenocereus griseus), which the Wayuu call yosú. The word yotojoro originally referred to the cane-like inner wood of the yosú cactus. This plant is used for many other purposes: it is planted to create living fences around pastures; young shoots are fed to goats; the fruit (iguaraya) is similar to pitahaya and is a popular food among the Wayuu. Because the demand for yosú as food and wood is seasonal, at times there is little fruit, building material or even cuttings for fences. It has thus been proposed to develop techniques for the Wayuu to cultivate it. Due to varying supply of yosú wood for construction, other plants are also used, including trupillo or turpío (Prosopis juliflora), jattá (Haematoxylum brasiletto), kapchip (Capparis zeylanica) and kayush (Peruvian Apple Cactus, Cereus repandus).

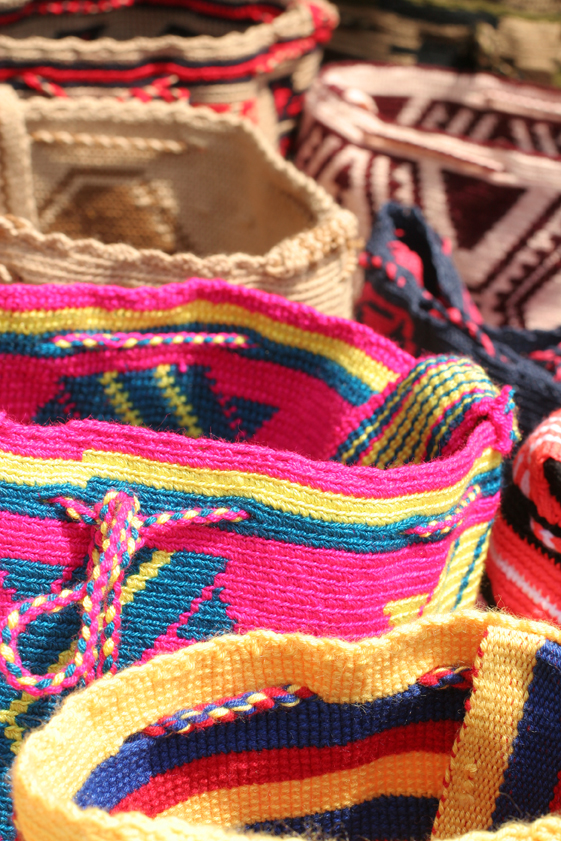
Wayuu handcrafted mochilas (crocheted bags)

=== Music and dances ===
Traditional Wayuu music is closely tied to economy and social life. For example, they sing to their cattle. They also use music for meetings and celebrations, as well as mourning rituals during funerals. La Yonna is a traditional dance used to honor guests.

Girls are taught a dance that is at the heart of the Majayura, the ritual passage of the "young Wayuu virgin". She must dance in a courtship dance (baile de cortejo) with prospective suitors. With her head covered and wearing a fabric shawl and dress, the girl dances forward with small steps and arms outstretched, swooping like a bird, within a circle made up of people from the village. The male dances backward before her, coming close and yielding as they circle around, until he finally falls to the ground. The adult men play traditional drums and musical instruments in their ring around the dancers. If a male is respected in his clan and accepted, he must pay a dowry to the girl's mother and male relatives. This used to be in the form of goats and sheep for the support of the clan.

Traditional musical instruments include kashi, sawawa (a type of flute), ma'asi, totoy and the taliraai (tubular flute), wootoroyoi (a type of clarinet), among others.

=== Wayuu artisan industry ===
Wayuu women learn how to weave at a very early age. The Wayuu are descendants of the Caribs and Arawak peoples, largely known for their strong weaving tradition. The Wayuu carry on this traditional weaving.

It is said the Wayuu learned to weave thanks to a mythical spider called Walekeru. This spider would create magical pieces using thread from her mouth. She is the one that taught all Wayuu women to crochet, crocheting hammocks to sleep in, belts for men, shoes, bracelets and Wayuu bags of all different sizes and crochet methods to be used for different purposes. Today, the skill of crocheting has become the main source of income for the Wayuu community.

Traditionally, Wayuu bags were not as bright and colorful as they are now. Cotton used to be able to grow in the region of La Guajira thus Wayuu bags were made of natural fibers. They were dyed using plants and elements of the natural surrounding, thus took on shades of brown, red and other natural hues.

Today, there is a common misconception that Wayuu bags are made of cotton. But all crochet pieces from the Wayuu community are made of acrylic threads from companies like Miratex, providing bright hues that will not wash out easily with time as opposed to natural fibers.

Weaving and crocheting make up a large part of their daily life, especially for women. Most of the women presently weave or will do it at some point through their lives. The men participate in the industry as well; they make the straps, provide the materials, and transport the goods to the city centers. The tribe produces millions of high-quality artisan products every year. This artisan weaving industry plays a vital role in the local economy, and the people are known most for the mochila Wayuu or Wayuu Bag.

Today, Wayuu bags are the most exported handicraft in all of Colombia.

The Wayuu have resented the way that foreigners have profited more from their work than do the artisans.

== Representation in media ==
- The Wayuu are among the peoples depicted in the 1921 documentary Blandt Syd-Amerikas urskovsindianere (Among the Primeval Forest Indians of South America).
- The feature film Pájaros de verano (Birds of Passage, 2019) is set on the Guajira peninsula and among the Wayuu in the 1970s. Directed by Cristina Gallego and Ciro Guerra, it stars José Acosta and Carmiña Martínez. In addition, many non-actor Wayuu are included in the film, which is primarily in the Wayuu language. It explores the disruption of traditional clan culture after members of the tribe enter the drug trade, and are affected by great wealth and violence.
- The film "la Buena Vida" by the German filmmaker Jens Schanze is about the forced displacement of Wayuu people from the town of Tamaquito. The Swiss-based company Glencore with its Colombian subsidiary el Cerrejon needs their land for coal-mining.

== Notable people ==
- Débora Barros, survivor of the Bahía Portete massacre and peace activist
- Luis Díaz (born 1997), Colombian football player for FC Bayern Munich and national team
- Aloha Núñez (born 1983), former Minister of Indigenous Peoples of Venezuela
- Lido Pimienta (born 1986), Colombian–Canadian musician, artist and winner of the 2017 Polaris Music Prize
- Noelí Pocaterra (born 1936), Venezuelan indigenous activist and politician
- Carmen Ramírez Boscán (born 1982), Colombian activist and politician
- Arelis Uriana (born 1976), first indigenous woman to run for President of Colombia in 2022
- Patricia Velásquez (born 1971), Venezuelan actress, model and founder of the Wayúu Tayá Foundation

== See also ==
- Pütchipü'ü, the mediator in the traditional Wayuu justice system.
- Arhuacos
- Haplogroup Q1a3a
- Indigenous peoples of the Americas
- Koguis
- Taironas
