= Art of Cesar Department =

Colombian art

Art of Cesar Department refers to the expressions of art in the Colombian Department of Cesar in the Caribbean Region of Colombia. The diverse range of human activities and artifacts, painting, sculpture, printmaking, musical and dance expressions, literature and other forms of visual and auditory arts.

The art in Cesar Department is sponsored by the Colombian Ministry of Culture, and the local Department Secretary of Education, Culture and Sports.

== History of art in Cesar Department ==
The first expressions of art in the Cesar Department were developed by the indigenous people's traditions, present since their arrival from Mesoamerica and the Caribbean. Then there are different cultural expressions from the extinct Taironas, the Arhuacos, Kankuamos mostly present in the Sierra Nevada de Santa Marta mountain range. The culture of the Arhuacos is specially rich in sawing wool and fique, drawings on stones, pottery, work on wood, and other handicrafts.

With the arrival of the Spanish the European art expressions were also introduced, and the Spanish also introduced the African slaves who developed their own artistic expressions in the Cesar Department based on their African heritage. Due to the process of independence from Spain and the political struggle that followed, art expressions in Cesar Department decreased, only maintaining some of the indigenous traditional art, poetry, musical expressions that developed like cumbia and vallenato. The musical expression was born from the strong storytelling tradition, inherited from the three cultural expressions of local indigenous peoples, Europeans and African descendants.

During the second half of the 20th century and with the creation of Cesar Department the creation of local government secretaries intended to support and develop artistic expressions were created. in the Cesar Department the governor created the Education, Culture and Sports. Each municipal administration depending on its budget created a secretary of culture or through an associated institution such as the Casa de la Cultura (Cultural house) or the Escuela de Bellas Artes Fine Arts School in Valledupar.

== Painting ==
During the 1970s and with the support from the local government and society, many painters, Some of this new generation were represented by Walter Arland, Ineris Cuello, Rita Hinojosa, Eivar Moya, Efrain Quintero Molina, Celso Castro (also a photographer), Franklin Ramos, Maria Liliana Mejia, Jose Anibal Moya, Alvaro Palomino, among others.
