= Gerardo Reichel-Dolmatoff =

Austrian anthropologist (1912–1994)

- Burial place of Reichel-Dolmatoff
- Born: 6 March 1912; Salzburg, Austria-Hungary
- Died: 17 May 1994 (aged 82); Bogotá, Colombia
- Known for: Archaeology, anthropology
- Spouse: Alicia Dussán Maldonado (m. 1943)
- Children: 4
- Scientific career
- Fields: Archaeology & anthropology of indigenous peoples of Colombia

Gerardo Reichel-Dolmatoff (6 March 1912 – 17 May 1994) was an Austrian anthropologist and archaeologist. He is known for his fieldwork among many different Amerindian cultures such as in the Amazonian tropical rainforests (e.g. Desana Tucano), and also among dozens of other indigenous groups in Colombia in the Caribbean Coast (such as the Kogi of the Sierra Nevada de Santa Marta), as well as others living in the Pacific Coast, Llanos Orientales, and in the Andean and inter-Andean regions (Muisca) as well as in other areas of Colombia, and he also did research on campesino societies. For nearly six decades he advanced ethnographic and anthropological studies, as well as archaeological research, and as a scholar was a prolific writer and public figure renowned as a staunch defender of indigenous peoples. Reichel-Dolmatoff has worked with other archaeologists and anthropologists such as Marianne Cardale de Schrimpff, Ana María Groot, Gonzalo Correal Urrego and others. He died 17 May 1994 in Colombia.

== Personal life ==
Reichel was born in 1912 in Salzburg, then part of Austria-Hungary, as son of the artist Carl Anton Reichel and Hilde Constance Dolmatoff. Oriented in the classics (Latin and Greek) he did most of his high school at the Benedictine school of Kremsmunster in Austria. He attended classes at the Faculté des Lettres of the Sorbonne and in the École du Louvre from late 1937 to 1938. Reichel emigrated to Colombia in 1939, where he became a Colombian citizen in 1942. Reichel became member and was the Secretary to the Free France Movement (1942-1943) with the help of his colleague and friend the French ethnologist Paul Rivet who was the Delegate of the Resistance of France Libre and living in Colombia. General Charles De Gaulle later awarded Reichel-Dolmatoff with the medal of the Ordre national du Mérite. Reichel-Dolmatoff spent the rest of his life in research in the fields of anthropology, archaeology, ethnoecology, ethnohistory, ethnoastronomy, material culture, art, and vernacular architecture, among others.

== Career ==
Reichel-Dolmatoff developed a keen interest for conducting fieldwork which would take him and his studies throughout the country, the Caribbean area, La Guajira desert, the Chocó rainforests, the Llanos Orientales, to the mountains of the Sierra Nevada de Santa Marta and the Amazon rainforests.

Some of Reichel-Dolmatoff's archaeological research was essential in creating the basic chronological framework for most of the Colombian area, and is still used today. In a trip to the upper Meta River in the Orinoco plains in 1940, he conducted research and later published the earliest studies done on the Guahibo Indians. In 1943 Gerardo wrote his first article on the Muisca settlement of Soacha. That same year, together with his wife anthropologist and archaeologist Alicia Dussán, he conducted an analysis on pre-Columbian burial urns of the Magdalena River. Working in the Tolima region inhabited by Amerindians and the renowned indigenous leader Quintin Lame, they also published a study indicating the indigenous culture of the local populations and also indicated the blood type variations among the indigenous groups of the Pijao in the Department of Tolima as further proof of their Amerindian identity as these tribes were arguing over rights to their ancestral territories.

Switching residency to the city of Santa Marta in 1946, the Reichel-Dolmatoffs created and headed the Instituto Etnologico del Magdalena in 1945 and created also a small museum about the anthropology and archaeology of the Sierra Nevada region. Reichel-Dolmatoff wrote a two volume monography of the Kogi Indians in the 1940s which to this day is considered a classic reference. For the next five years, Gerardo and his colleague and wife conducted research throughout the Sierra Nevada de Santa Marta region, focusing particularly on the Tairona descendants, the Kogui, also known as the Kogi or Kaggaba, and also worked with the Arhuaco and Wiwa indigenous groups, as well as ethnography of a peasant community among the people of Aritama (Kankuamo). Reichel-Dolmatoff carried out a regional study of the area covering archaeology, ethnohistory and anthropology, making it one of the first such regional studies made in Colombia. Reichel also did research in the Pacific coast and studied amongst others the Guna of the Caiman Nuevo River, west of the Gulf of Urabá. Several years later, Reichel published ethnohistorical studies and anthropological research related to the Kogi, demonstrating their connections to ancestral Tairona chiefdoms.

In the late 1950s, Reichel and his family moved to the coastal city of Cartagena. Reichel taught classes in medical anthropology at the university there and engaged in programs of public health with an anthropological perspective. Actively involved in archaeological excavations in the Caribbean region around Cartagena, in 1954, the Reichel-Dolmatoffs located and also excavated, amongst others, the Barlovento site, which was the first early Formative shell-midden site found in Colombia. At Momil, they conducted the first study of societies engaged in a subsistence change from shifting cultivation (manioc) to corn agriculturalists. After returning to live in Bogotá in 1960 Reichel was the founder, professor, and first Chair the first Department of Anthropology in Colombia. Reichel did archaeological excavations at the site of Puerto Hormiga where they discovered the earliest dated pottery in all of the New World (at that time), -dated over 5 thousand years old- which indicated that pottery had been first developed in the Caribbean coast of Colombia and then spread elsewhere to the rest of the Americas (and hence was not brought through diffusion from the Old World as had been formerly suggested by other archaeologists) .(Reichel see biblio). Reichel also excavated in other sites including in San Agustin, Huila. He published his analyses of the Puerto Hormiga site regarding early Formative cultures, and of the San Agustin site regarding chiefdoms. Reichel also produced one of the first overviews of Colombian archaeology and proposed an interpretive framework of its millenarian pre-historic past.

In 1963, Reichel and his wife taught courses in anthropology at the Universidad de los Andes, and then in 1964 formally created the first Department of Anthropology in Colombia at the university in Bogotá. Reichel-Dolmatoff worked for 5 years at the Department and left together with his wife and several other professors due to changes in the Department.

Reichel received a short visiting fellowship to Cambridge University in 1970 and became an adjunct professor at the Anthropology Department of the University of California in Los Angeles. During the 1960s and until the mid-1990s Reichel-Dolmatoff advanced research on Amerindian shamanism, indigenous modes of life, ethnoecology, and on cosmologies and worldviews, and he also did research on hallucinogens related to shamanism, entheogens, ethnoastronomy, ethnobotany, ethnozoology, and on the vernacular architecture of temples and of the Amazonian 'maloca' longhouses; additionally he did research on the shamanic symbolism of pre-Columbian goldwork, as well as other Amerindian artifacts and material culture, including basketry.

Reichel-Dolmatoff was a member of the Colombian Academy of Sciences, and a Foreign Associate Member of the NAS National Academy of Sciences of the United States and he was also a member of the Academia Real Española de Ciencias. He was awarded the Thomas H. Huxley medal by the Royal Anthropological Institute of Great Britain and Ireland in 1975. Reichel-Dolmatoff was the single author of 40 books and of over 400 articles, all dedicated to the archaeology and anthropology of Colombia and specifically highlighting the relevance of indigenous peoples of the past and present.

In 1983, Reichel-Dolmatoff was one of the founding members of the Third World Academy of Sciences (TWAS), which was created and headed by dr. Abdus Salam (Nobel Prize in Physics) with renowned scientists of the Third World who sought to focus differently on the issues of science and technology for the interests of the developing countries themselves.

=== International recognition ===
While living in Colombia for over half a century, Reichel-Dolmatoff provided his professional services to the national and departmental governments, and as university professor, researcher and author to public and private universities. In 1945 he founded in Santa Marta the Instituto Ethnologico Nacional del Magdalena and in the early 1950s he became professor of Medical Anthropology at the University of Cartagena. He occupied, amongst other positions, those of researcher and lecturer of the Instituto Etnologico Nacional and the Colombian Institute of Anthropology and he was Chair and professor of the Department of Anthropology of the Universidad de los Andes. He was visiting professor of the National Museum of Ethnology in Japan. Reichel-Dolmatoff participated in academic congresses and seminars and wrote conference papers in universities and international or national academic events in South America, North America and Central America as well as in Europe, Japan. In the field of archaeology, Reichel-Dolmatoff helped define the early archaeological evidence of the Formative stage in Colombia, based on sites excavated which provided the then most ancient site in all the Americas where pottery had originated over 6,000 years ago, and this research was tied also to new interpretations of the meaning and connections of the cultural evolution of Colombia with other regions of the Americas. Reichel-Dolmatoff researched origins of early chiefdoms and explained the millenarian evolution of Amerindian cultures and their links to contemporary indigenous groups. His excavations focused mainly on living spaces and garbage heaps, where the archaeologist avoided exploring or excavating monumental sculptures, monumental architecture and indigenous burial sites. In the field of anthropology, Reichel-Dolmatoff focused on investigating and celebrating Colombia's ethnic and cultural diversity and especially of indigenous peoples. The scope and extent of his work and dedication to understanding, acknowledging and disseminating the importance and value of Colombia's contemporary indigenous peoples was significant.

At a conference in 1987, Reichel-Dolmatoff spoke the following words:

"Today I must acknowledge that since the beginning of the 1940s, it has been for me a real privilege to live with, and also try to understand in depth, diverse indigenous groups. I noted among them particular mental structures and value systems that seemed to be beyond any of the typologies and categories held then by Anthropology. I did not find the ‘noble savage’ nor the so-called ‘primitive’. I did not find the so-called degenerate or brutish Indian nor even less the inferior beings as were generally described by the rulers, missionaries, historians, politicians and writers. What I did find was a world with a philosophy so coherent, with morals so high, with social and political organizations of great complexity, and with sound environmental management based on well-founded knowledge. In effect, I saw that the indigenous cultures offered unsuspected options that offered strategies of cultural development that simply we should not ignore because they contain valid solutions and are applicable to a variety of human problems. All of this more and more made my admiration grow for the dignity, the intelligence and the wisdom of these aborigines, who not least have developed wondrous dynamics and forms of resistance thanks to which so-called ‘civilization’ has not been able to exterminate them.

I have tried to contribute to the recuperation of the dignity of the Indians, that dignity that since the arrival of the Spaniards has been denied to them; in effect, for five hundred years there has been an open tendency to malign and try to ignore the millenary experience of the population of a whole continent. But humankind is one; human intelligence is a gift so precious that it can not be despised in any part of the world, and this country is in arrears in recognizing the great intellectual capacity of the indigenous peoples and their great achievements due to their knowledge systems, which do not lose validity for the mere fact they do not adjust to the logic of Western thinking.

I hope my conceptualizations and works have had a certain influence beyond anthropological circles. Maybe I am too optimistic, but I think that anthropologists of the older and new generations, according to their epochs and the changing roles of the Social Sciences, have contributed to revealing new dimensions of the Colombian people and of nationhood. I also have trust that our anthropological work constitutes an input to the indigenous communities themselves, and to their persistent effort to attain the respect, in the largest sense of the term, that is owed to them within Colombian society. I think that the country must highlight the indigenous legacy and guarantee fully the survival of the contemporary ethnic groups. I think that the county should be proud to be mestizo. I do not think that it is possible to advance towards the future without building upon the knowledge of the proper millenarian history, nor overlook what occurred to the indigenous peoples nor the black populations (Afrodescendants) during the Conquest and the Colonies, and also during the Republic and to this day. These are, in sum, some of the ideas that have guided me through almost half a century. They have given sense to my life."

== Bibliography ==
This list is a selection.

- People of Aritama (ISBN 0-415-33045-9)
- Land of the Elder Brothers (ISBN 958-638-323-7)
- Recent Advances in the Archaeology of the Northern Andes (ISBN 0-917956-90-7)
- Rainforest Shamans: Essays on the Tukano Indians of the Northwest Amazon (ISBN 0-9527302-4-3)
- Yurupari: Studies of an Amazonian Foundation Myth (ISBN 0-945454-08-2)
- The Forest Within: The World-view of the Tukano Amazonian Indians (ISBN 0-9527302-0-0)
- Indians of Colombia: Experience and Cognition (ISBN 958-9138-68-3)
- The Shaman and the Jaguar: A Study of Narcotic Drugs Among the Indians of Colombia (ISBN 0-87722-038-7)
- Amazonian Cosmos: The Sexual and Religious Symbolism of the Tukano Indians (ISBN 0-226-70732-6)
- Colombia (Ancient Peoples and Places)

== See also ==
- List of Muisca scholars
- Marianne Cardale de Schrimpff
