= Kankuamo =

Kankuamo, Cancuamo, or Kankui may refer to:

- Kankuamo people, an ethnic group of Colombia
- Kankuamo language, a language of Colombia
- Kankuamo (spider), a genus of spiders
