= Alicia Dussán de Reichel =

Colombian anthropologist (1920–2023)

- Born: Alicia Dussán Maldonado; 16 October 1920; Bogotá, Colombia
- Died: 17 May 2023 (aged 102); Bogotá, Colombia
- Other name: Alicia Dussán de Reichel-Dolmatoff
- Occupations: Anthropologist; ethnologist
- Years active: 1942–2008
- Spouse: Gerardo Reichel-Dolmatoff (m. 1943; died 1994)

Alicia Dussán de Reichel (16 October 1920 – 17 May 2023) was a Colombian educator, who was one of the first students of ethnology in the country. For two decades, she was the only woman conducting archaeological and anthropological studies in the country. Her research focused on Colombia and the Caribbean and along with her husband, she founded the University of the Andes' Department of Anthropology. She occupied Chair 15 of the Colombian Academy of Exact, Physical and Natural Sciences until 2008 and was the only anthropologist to be a member during her tenure. In 2010, she was honored by the French Government with the designation of officer of the Ordre des Arts et des Lettres.

== Early life ==
Alicia Dussán Maldonado was born on 16 October 1920 in Bogotá, Colombia, to Lucrecia Maldonado Parra and Agustín Dussán Quiroga. Her father was a landowner, originally from Villavieja and her mother was a passionate liberal nationalist, as her father, José María Maldonado Neira, had served as a General in the Thousand Days' War. Another ancestor from her Parra line was Antonio María Díaz, who had fought in the Battle of Boyacá. From the third grade, Dussán developed an interest in other cultures, particularly those of Africa and Asia, as well as a curiosity about Colombia's indigenous people.

Dussán attended the Gimnasio Femenino (Women's Gymnasium) in Bogotá, a prestigious private school which incorporated a Montessori method as well as moral instruction to prepare young women to become good wives and mothers. She was one of the first group of young women in Colombia who pursued higher education and a career. Dussán's father died before she completed high school. She graduated in 1938 and with the consent of her mother, decided to go to Europe to further her studies. She enrolled in the University of Berlin studying German Culture and Language and while she was in Europe took the opportunity to visit many museums, seeing for the first time archaeological objects from South America. She was forced to return to Colombia at the outbreak of World War II. Dussán enrolled in the Faculty of Law at the National University of Colombia in 1940, but fascinated by archaeology attended lectures offered by Paul Rivet. After studying law through 1941, she transferred to the National Ethnological Institute (NEI), which had recently been founded by Rivet. The program was an innovative approach to scientifically based methodology, rather than rote memorization. Students were encouraged to evaluate the biological, cultural and technological influences of indigenous peoples upon each other. Receiving her degree in 1942, the following year, Dussán married fellow student Gerardo Reichel-Dolmatoff.

== Career ==
Between 1942 and 1945 Dussán worked as research assistant at NEI and jointly worked with her husband on an evaluation of funerary urns in the Magdalena Department and carried out a study on the physical anthropology of the Pijao people of the Tolima Department. During this period, she also gave birth to the couple's first child, René Reichel Dussán. She was awarded research grant to carry out studies in 1944 from the French government. Besides the difficulty of the physical work, Dussán had to face criticism from local priests and other members of society, who felt that her dress and behavior were inappropriate for a woman. For the first two decades of her career, she was the only woman working in anthropology in Colombia, and was ridiculed for not choosing a career as a social worker or nurse, if she insisted on working. Wearing pants, instead of the customary dresses for women at that time, and becoming one of the first women to drive a car resulted in people calling her a man and throwing stones at her.

In 1946, she co-founded with her husband the Ethnological Institute of Magdalena and worked there through 1950. Collecting ceramics and ethnographic materials, they established a museum of pieces they amassed during their joint archaeological fieldwork in an area they designated as Pueblito, which is now in the Tayrona National Natural Park, and the river valleys surrounding the Ranchería and Cesar Rivers. One particularly important ritual they documented was a practice of secondary burial among the Yuko or Yukpa people who lived in the northeastern part of the Cesar Department. Working on the slopes of the Sierra Nevada de Santa Marta, Dussán who was pregnant again, collected materials from the local indigenous people on their mythology, socialization processes, and traditions. Using field questionnaires designed and adapted from Margaret Mead's methodology, she made pioneering studies on gender relations and parenting traditions in Taganga.

In 1951, Dussán began working as a research assistant to the Colombian Institute of Anthropology and History until 1956. She and her husband undertook work at a site known as Aritama, a pseudonym for Atánquez, where they could study the villagers of the Kankuamo people. The mestizo town offered an opportunity to study the transitions between cultures, as to those in nearby Valledupar, the village was known as an indigenous town, but to those living in traditional native communities, Atánquez was viewed as a "Spanish" town. The couple's findings, which included Dussán's analysis of the social changes, documented how the society had been reshaped by contact would be published as The People of Aritama (1961), which quickly became a classic of the studies of early society in Colombia. Her work was funded in part by a research grant from the Wenner Gren Foundation in New York City. Between 1954 and 1958, the couple lived in Cartagena and worked in a collaborative program sponsored by the University of Cartagena and their new department focusing on public health and preventative medicine. The program allowed them to participate in archaeological digs along the Caribbean coast of Colombia, and conduct medical anthropological studies, which were insightful for their findings on Atánquez.

Returning to Bogotá in 1960, Dussán took a job with the Inter-American Center for Housing and Planning (IACHP) and later that year, she took a position as a research associate of the Institute of Andean Research in Washington, D. C. through 1962. These organizations allowed exploration to continue on the Pacific coast, in an area ranging from Panama's Darién Province to the Colombia–Ecuador border. Very little archaeological work had been done in the area at the time. While studying in the area, El Hermanito an apocalyptic prophet became the subject of one of her studies. El Hermanito's doomsday predictions affected both the customs and local economy, causing both indigenous and Afro-Colombian populations to sell off their belongings or sacrifice them into the river, and kill off their livestock. Dussán's study of the movement was the first religiously based anthropological study of its kind in Latin America. The association with the IACHP allowed Dussán to study urban problems, evaluating marginal neighborhoods. One such study focused on the El Carmen neighborhood of Bogotá.

In 1964, the Reichels founded the Department of Anthropology at the Universidad de los Andes at the suggestion of the rector, Ramón de Zubiría. Financed by the Ford Foundation, they designed a program which would grant a degree in applied anthropology covering studies in archaeology, ethnology, linguistics, material culture studies and physical anthropology. In addition to working as a professor in the department, Dussán traveled at her own expense to evaluate the anthropology departments at New York University, Tulane University, and UCLA to develop programs which could be adapted for the new department. Dussán published Problemas y necesidades de la investigación etnológica en Colombia (Problems and Needs of Ethnological Research in Colombia, 1965) which stressed the urgency of evaluating those communities in danger of having their cultures usurped by modernization. The essay had international impact and created discussion on the importance of fieldwork and preserving indigenous cultures. In 1967, she served as the Colombian representative to the first international conference, held in Austria, which discussed teaching anthropology in Latin America and her paper, presented at the conference urged that their program was ready to undertake postgraduate training. Between 1967 and 1968, Dussán served as an advisor to the Gold Museum, Bogotá to develop scripts for the museum exhibits. After 1968, she no longer participated in field work on archaeological sites. Throughout her career, she published 40 books, around half as a co-author with her husband, and nearly 500 articles.

While continuing to work in a consultative role with the Gold Museum, Dussán was appointed to serve as the head of the Division of Museums and Restoration of the Colombian Institute of Culture in 1970. Simultaneously, as a Guggenheim Fellow, she worked on a project sponsored by Harvard University and the Colombian National Institute of Nutrition to evaluate the effects of malnutrition on mental development in Colombia. She resigned from the museum post in 1973 and between 1975 and 1977 worked among the Kogi people completing archaeological and ethnological studies. In 1978, Dussán moved to Los Angeles, California and worked as a visiting curator for the Museum of Cultural History. In 1980, she transferred to the Natural History Museum of Los Angeles County, where she remained until 1982. Returning to Colombia, she began work as a co-producer of an audiovisual media project on Colombian culture created by the Ministry of Education.

Dussán was one of the founders and a charter member of the Academy of Sciences of the Third World, created in 1983 to promote scholarship and stimulus to develop scientific study. She also led the drive to create the Academy of Women Scientists of the Third World. In 1984, she was recognized by the Colombian Congress of Anthropology with Meritorious Honor, grade III. That year, she became a coordinator at the Institute of Colombian Culture, in the Cultural Communications Division and then in 1988, coordinated institutional relations for the Colombian Academy of Exact, Physical and Natural Sciences through 1989. In 1993, Dussán was awarded the Honor of Cultural Merit from the mayor of Bogotá, in 1998 she was elected as an Officer of the Order of Democracy of the Republic of Colombia by the legislature, and in 2001 was recognized with the Honor of Scientific Woman of Success. The Ministry of Culture in conjunction with the Colombian Academy of Exact, Physical and Natural Sciences bestowed upon her the Lifetime Achievement prize for her scientific body of work in 2002. She occupied Chair 15 of the Colombian Academy of Exact, Physical and Natural Sciences until 2008, when she was granted the status Honorary Academic. During her tenure, she was the only anthropologist to be a member of the organization. In 2010, the French Government honored her as an officer of the Ordre des Arts et des Lettres.

== Personal life ==
Dussán turned 100 in October 2020, and died on 17 May 2023, at age 102.
