= Symbols of the Department of Magdalena =

The Symbols of the Department of Magdalena are the official symbols adopted by the Government of the Colombian Department of Magdalena to represent the identity of the Department of Magdalena as a subnational. These symbols intend to represent the Magdalenian identity by creating visual, verbal, and culturally iconic representations of Magdalena's history, culture, peoples, values and goals.

The flag and coat of arms are used in official ceremonies, departmental agencies, school, institutions and departmental officials to represent the department displayed in departmental institutions, schools, parks and documents of the department, and the anthem is usually performed during official ceremonies.

Aside from this symbols, the Governor of the Department of Magdalena, the Senators, Representatives, and other Departmental employees are considered symbols and representatives of the government to the people, and as so, they most act accordingly to properly represent the department.

== Flag of Magdalena ==
Flag of the Department of Magdalena

The Flag of the Department of Magdalena is the official flag on the Department of Magdalena. It consists of six horizontal stripes of equal length alternating between gules and azure, and is the defaced at the middle by a five-pointed star made up of 30 individual five-pointed stars which represent the thirty Municipalities that compromise the department.

The colors of the flag, red and blue, have different meanings, one of these is that red is for the blood spilled by the patriots throughout its history in the pursuit of freedom, and blue for the waters that surrounds it. Red and blue also represent integrity and firmness of the Magdaleniense's soul.

The colors are also used in the logo and uniform of the Unión Magdalena, the department's soccer team.

== Coat of arms of the Department of Magdalena ==
Coat of arms of the Department of Magdalena

The official Coat of arms of the Department of Magdalena was created by the Samarian painter Alvaro Corvacho. The coat of arms is a symbol of symbols, as it is made up of symbols associated with the region, like the Sierra Nevada de Santa Marta, the Tayrona, the flag, the Magdalena River, and the National Pantheon in the Quinta de San Pedro Alejandrino.

== Anthem of the Department of Magdalena ==
The Anthem of the Department of Magdalena was written by Francisco Covilla Noguera. It is sung poem composed of six stanzas and a chorus. The anthem manages to gives a small history lesson of the department in a very short poem, from its discovery by the Spaniards, and the indigenous people, to the slave trade, independence, the role of women, and its economy. The anthem is sung at special civic and state events usually after the National Anthem of Colombia and before the Anthem of Santa Marta.

== Other symbols of Magdalena ==
The Magdalena Department apart from the official symbols is symbolized by a number of other things that are associated with the department.

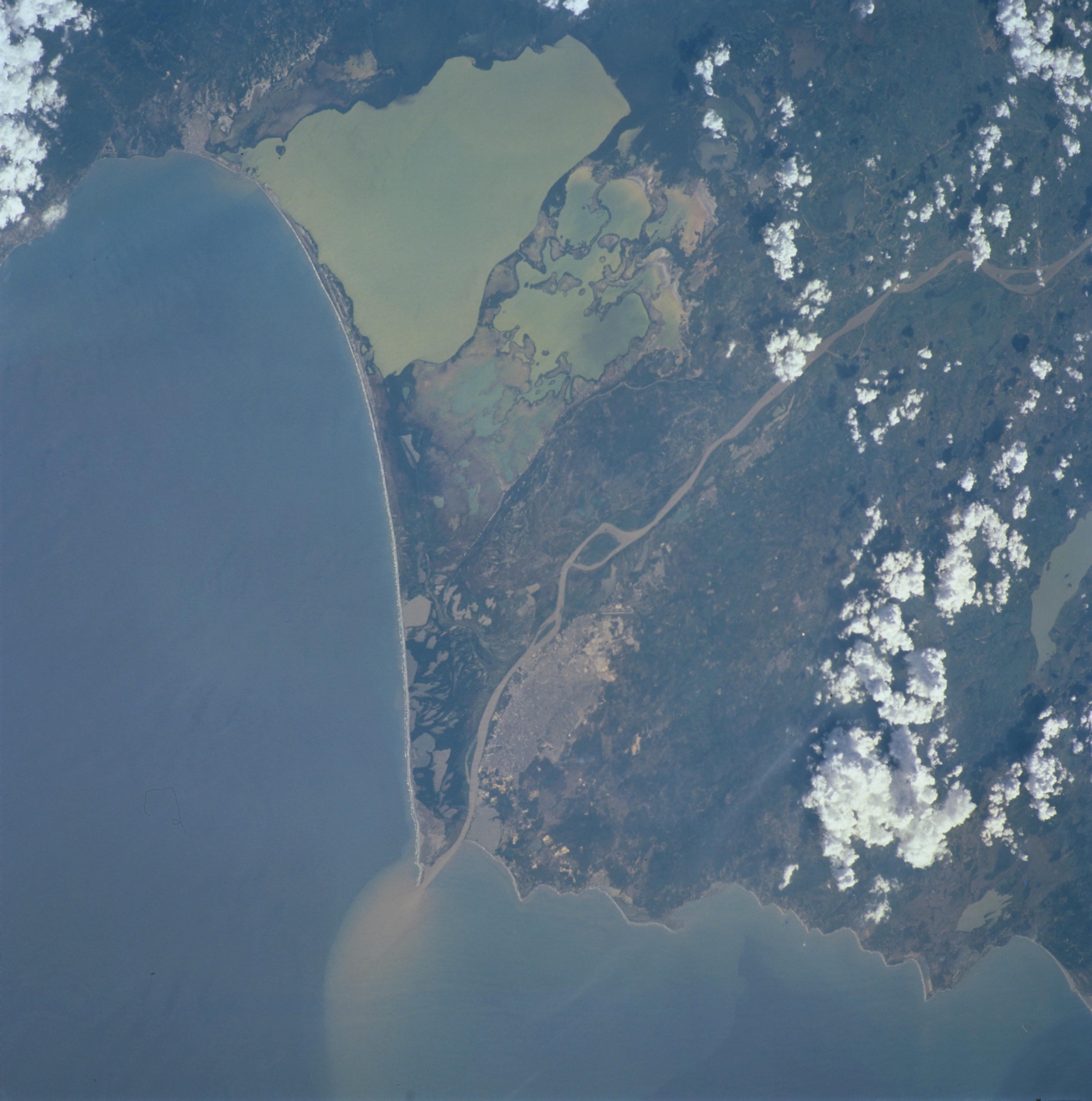
The Magdalena River, from which the department gets its name.

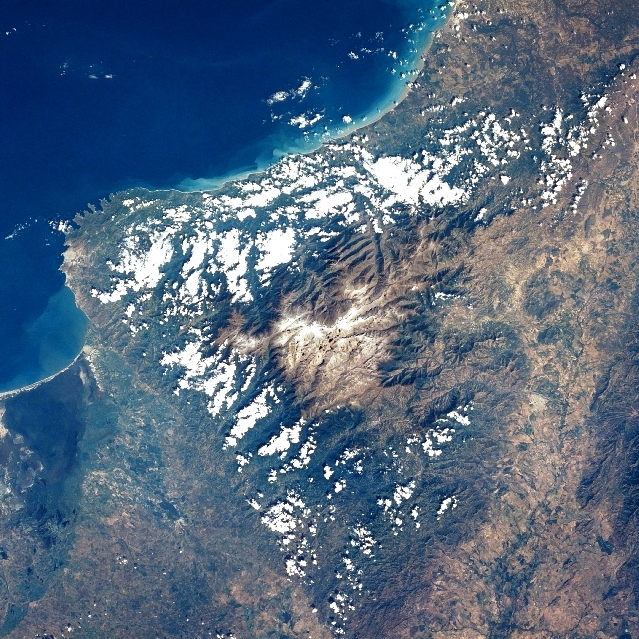
The Sierra Nevada de Santa Marta, a distinct geographical feature named after its capital and featured in the coat of arms.

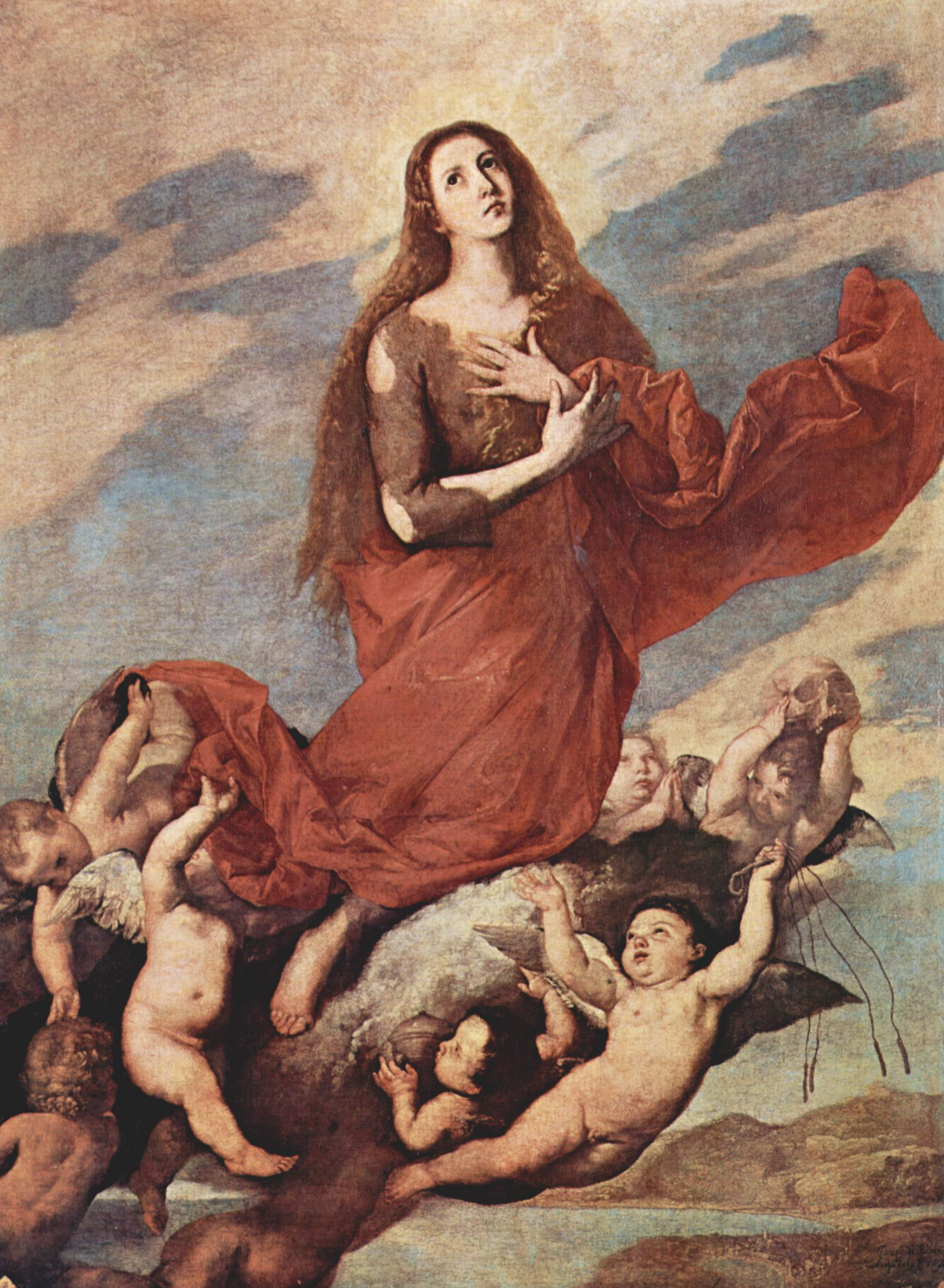
Mary Magdalene, Patron saint of the department, as the Magdalena river is named in her honor.

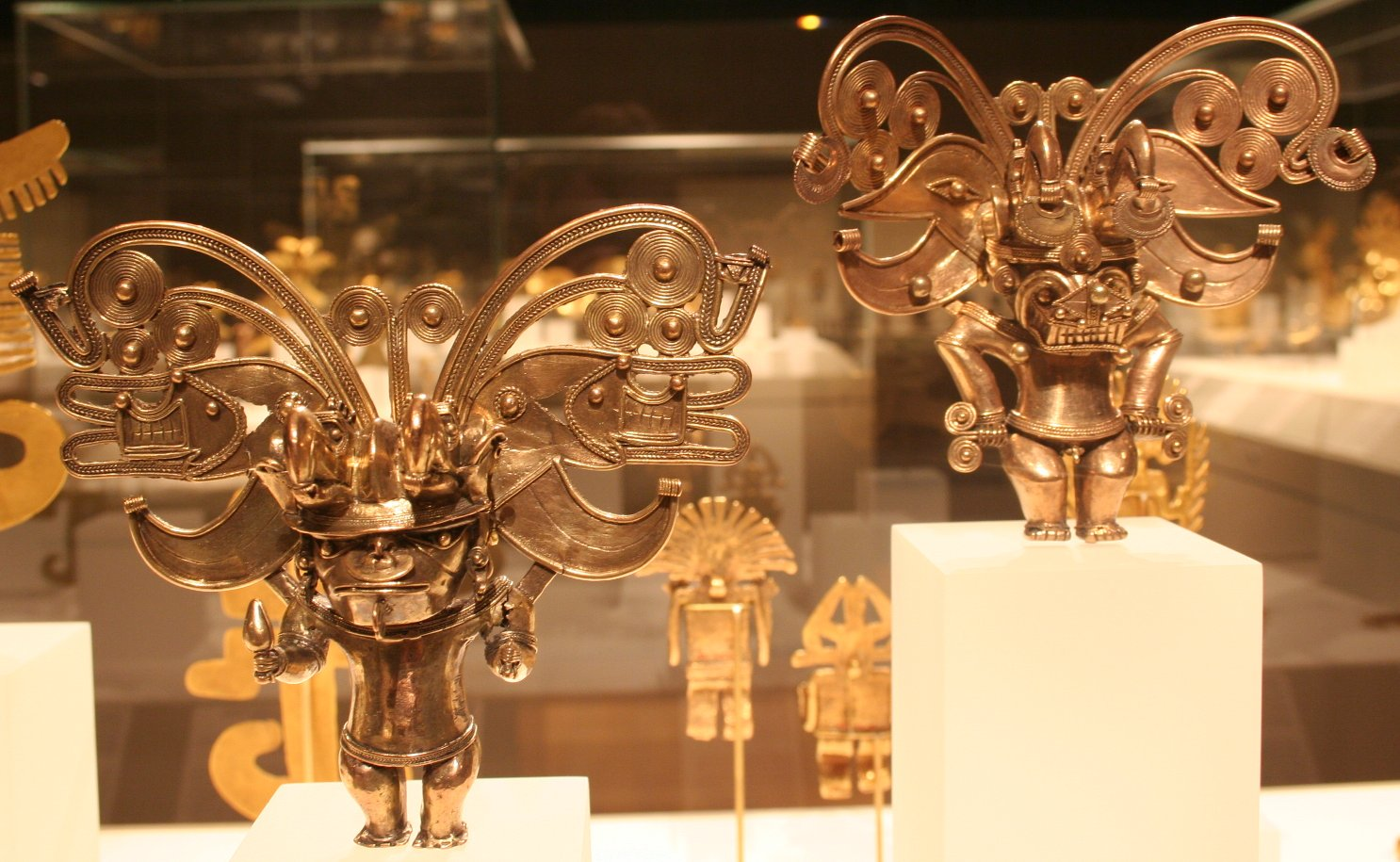
The Tayrona, an indigenous community that have inhabited the since before its discovery.

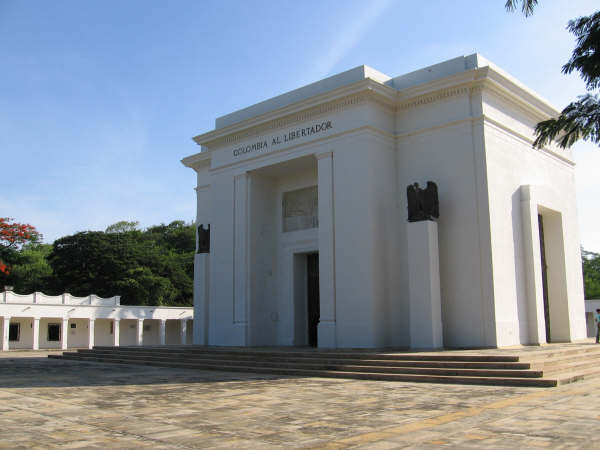
La Quinta de San Pedro Alejandrino, a Sanctuary of the Nation, it was the place where the Libertador Simón Bolívar died.

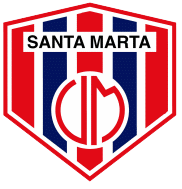
The Unión Magdalena, the department's soccer team.
