= Tairona =

Former family of ethnic and linguistic groups

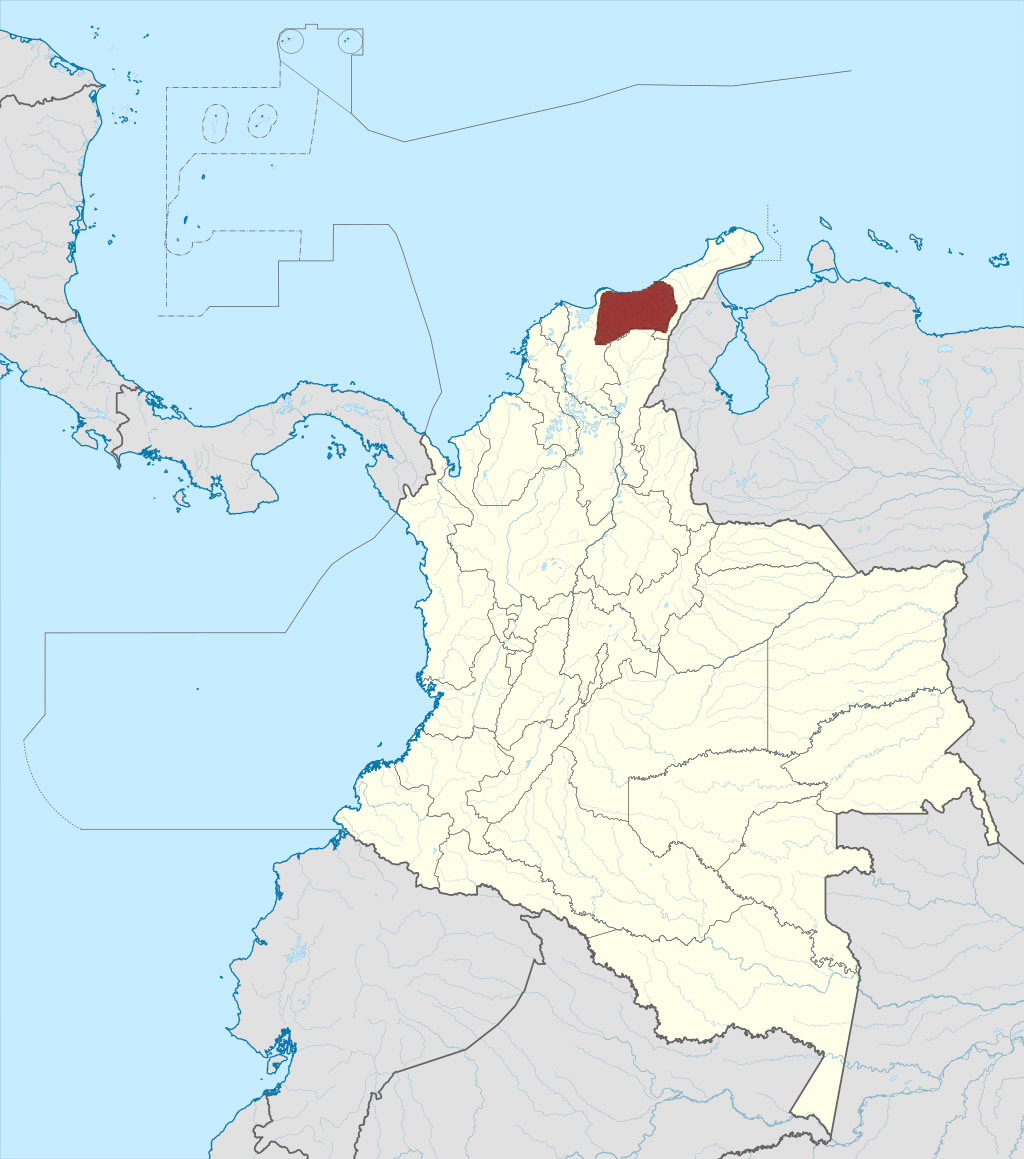
Tairona culture

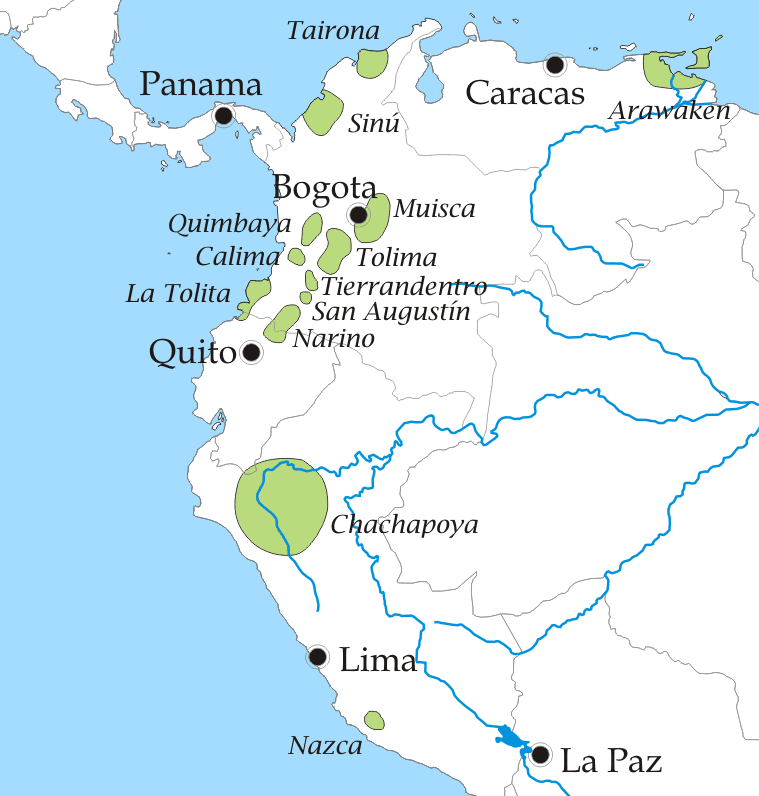
Map showing ancient pre-Columbian cultures in northern South America

Tairona or Tayrona was a Pre-Columbian cultural tradition characterised by a set of intense and complex relations between the coast, the slopes and the mountains of the Sierra Nevada de Santa Marta (in present-day Cesar, Magdalena and La Guajira Departments of Colombia, South America) sharing technology and social aspects and functioning effectively as an integrated organisational and productive system which consisted of a group of different chiefdoms whose definitive formation as an independent cultural tradition goes back to at least the 10th and 11th centuries AD.

Genetic and archaeological evidence shows a relatively dense occupation of the region by at least 200 BC. Pollen data compiled by Luisa Fernanda Herrera in 1980 shows considerable deforestation and the use of cultigens such as yuca and maize since possibly 1200 BC. However, occupation of the Colombian Caribbean coast by sedentary or semi-sedentary populations has been documented to have occurred by c. 4000 BC. In 2022, Gutiérrez Montoya Nayibe published the first complete synthesis of knowledge and research on the so-called Tairona.

Ethnohistorical data shows that initial contact with the Spanish was tolerated by the Tairona; but by 1600 AD confrontations grew, and a small part of the Tairona population moved to the higher stretches of the Sierra Nevada de Santa Marta. This movement allowed them to evade the worst of the Spanish colonial system during the 17th and 18th centuries. The Indigenous Kogi, Wiwa, Arhuacos (Ijka, Ifca) and Kankuamo people who live in the area today are believed to be direct descendants of the Tairona.

== Tairona-Kogi continuity ==
According to the Austro-Colombian anthropologist Gerardo Reichel-Dolmatoff, small groups of Tairona survivors fleeing from the Spaniards retreated to the highlands and gradually became the Kogi, the latter having kept their pre-Hispanic tradition intact and a sense of ecological balance. According to Augusto Oyuela-Caycedo, Reichel-Dolmatoff's research showed that the Kogi are not free from historical change, while still establishing a continuity with the Tairona. However, the Colombian archaeologist Santiago Giraldo criticised this idea as essentialist and representing the Kogi as "noble eco-savages", while ignoring the evolutions and tensions within the Sierra Nevada de Santa Marta as a region with a rich historical past.

According to Giraldo, indigenous groups, adopting a form of strategic essentialism, started using the past and their image as a political instrument to achieve their goals. Over time, the archaeological project at Ciudad Perdida expanded to the rest of the Sierra Nevada and became a nationalistic preservation project focused on the dual indigenous-ecological heritage, by representing the "Other" in a utopian and "savage" ahistorical reality contrasting with the modern world. Falk Xué Parra Witte, on the other hand, has stated that recognising these nuances "should not lead to the other extreme of being too sceptical or hesitant about asserting or at least exploring possible actualities in Kogi statements and practices". Henning Bischof argued that modern-day societies in the region are the result of the interaction between a lasting colonial economic system and pre-Hispanic entities, more than unchanged relics, and the passage of power from secular to religious authorities happened after, not before, the Spanish conquest, but still considered the cultural continuity between Tairona and Kogui to be obvious as the class of priests finally took power (after already increasing its influence) following the defeat of the 1600 revolt.

== Origin of the name ==
Etymological similarities of the word Tairona survive in the four main linguistic groups of the Sierra Nevada de Santa Marta: in Sanca it is pronounced Teiruna, in Kankuamo language Teijua or Tairuna, and in Ijka, Teruna, meaning "Males" or "sons of the Jaguar."

Although Tairona may be an inaccurate name for the people who inhabited the region during the contact with the Spanish Empire, it has become the most common name for a hierarchical network of villages that developed around 900. Initially it was used to refer to the inhabitants of a valley and probably a chiefdom named Tairo on the northern slope of the Sierra Nevada de Santa Marta. But by the 16th century, the Spanish used it for the whole group of complex chiefdoms in the area. The groups in the northern and western Sierra Nevada were largely indistinguishable to the Spaniards, and became indistinguishable to archaeologists in more modern times.

== Arts and crafts ==
The Tairona ceramic chronologies range from 200 BCE to 1650 CE, and the Caribbean coast of Colombia has evidence of ceramics from at least 2500 BCE. Recent investigations in Chengue, Parque Tairona by the Colombian archaeologist Alejandro Dever show significant variations in the ceramic that allow for a chronological division of sequence into at least five phases. The first phase, called Nahuange 1, appears to start at around 200 BCE and ends at around 500 CE when there appears to be a peak in the population. A second phase spans from 500 AD to about 900 AD; it can be called Nehuange 2, and was called Buritaca after detailed excavations by Jack Wynn in the 1970s.

From c. 900 CE began what is commonly called the Tairona period, characterized by an impressive increase in the variation, size and number of ceramic forms, many conserving the styles from the Nehuange or Buritaca phases. The Tairona 1 through 3 phases, from 900 to 1650, show significant local variations. This was shown by numerous works done in the 1980s by Colombian archaeologists Augusto Oyuela, Carl Langebaek, Luisa Fernanda Herrera and Ana Maria Groot, and others. During the Tairona period, the evidence for exchange increases as does the population of the entire region. The causes for this population increase are not fully known but what is evident is the robust local exchange networks that emerge at this time.

The Tairona civilization is most renowned for its distinctive goldwork. The earliest known Tairona gold work has been described for the Neguanje Period (from about 300 to 800 AD). Its use in the Tairona society appears to have extended beyond the elite, although little proof of this exists. The gold artifacts consist of pendants, lip-plugs, nose ornaments, necklaces, and earrings. The Tairona cast a meltable mixture of gold, silver and copper called Tumbaga into intricate moulds using clay, sand, charcoal and lost wax. Depletion gilding, using controlled corrosion to remove copper from the surface, gave the appearance of solid gold. Cast Tairona figure pendants (known as "caciques") in particular stand out among the goldworks of pre-Columbian America because of their richness in detail. The figurines depict human subjects - probably the shamanic elite that ruled them - in ornate dresses and with a large animal mask over the face. Many elements of their body posture (e.g., hands on their hips) and dress signal an aggressive stance, and hence are interpreted by some as evidence for the power of the wearer and the bellicose nature of Tairona society at that time. Not only that, but recent revelations have shown that this was the first step of a process known as 'transformation', which involved members of the shaman elite putting on sub-labial ornaments, nose rings etc. to resemble certain bat species and extract powers from the animal, opening their eyes to a greater truth.

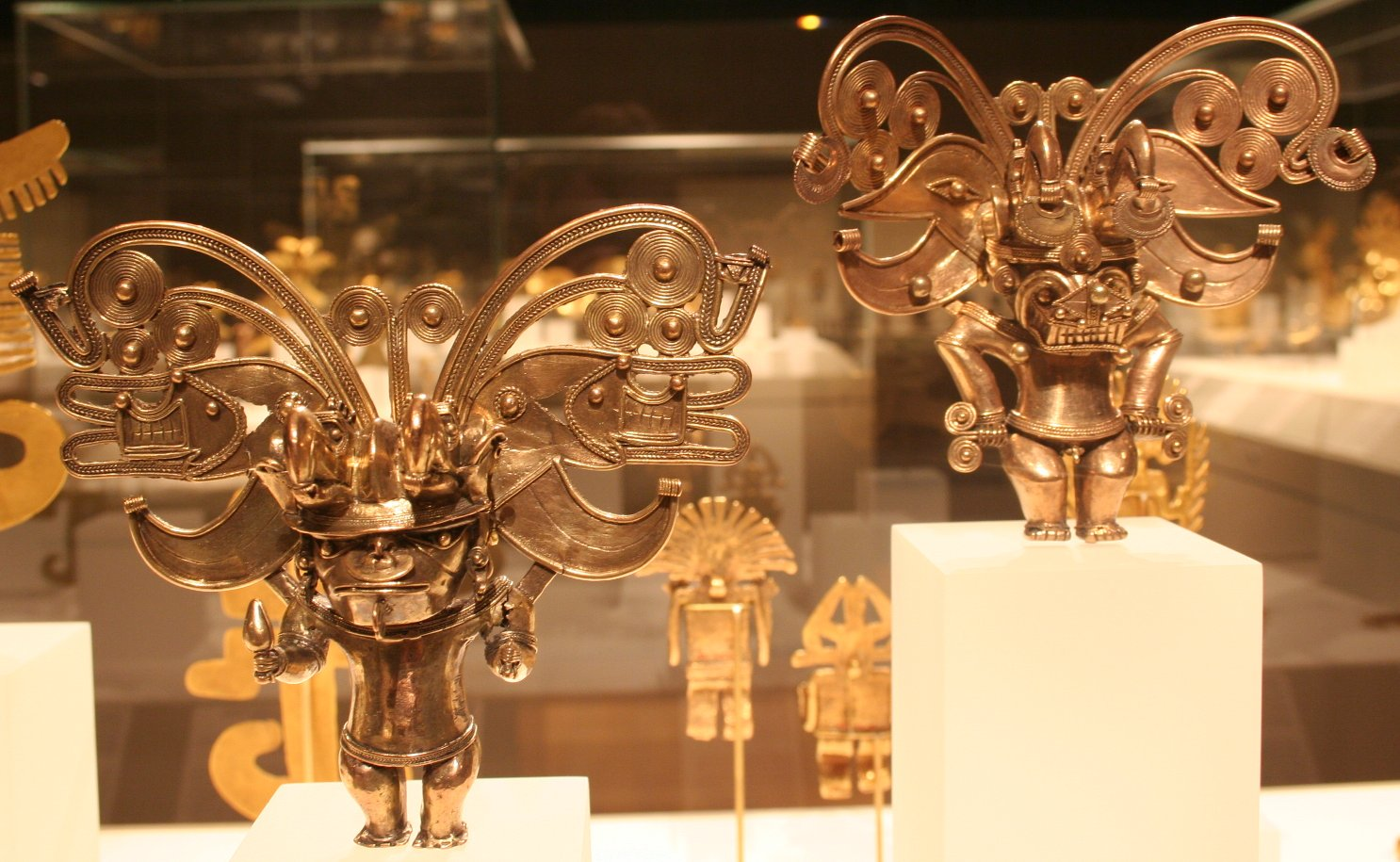
Tairona figure pendants in gold

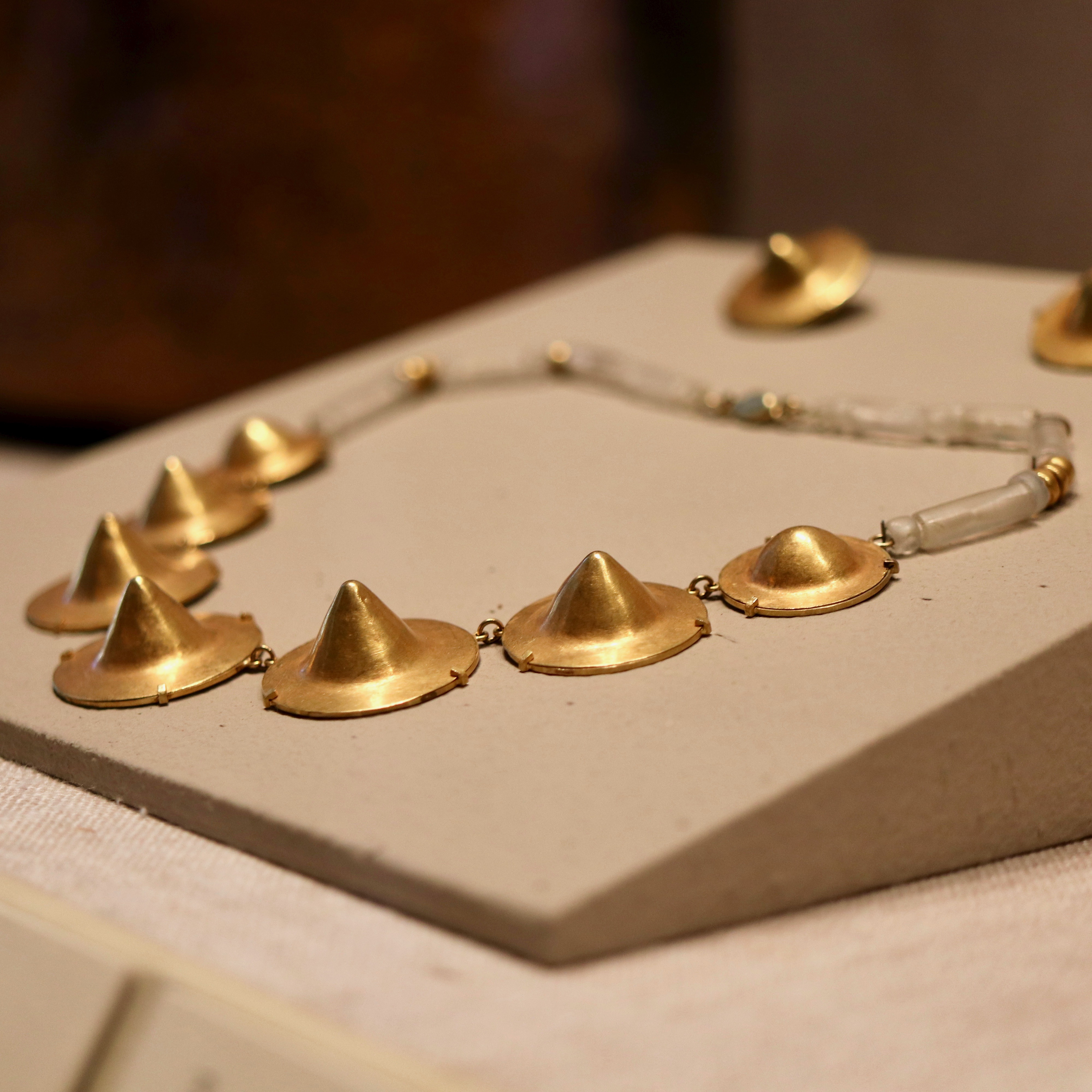
Tairona necklace and earrings. Shaped like cymbals. 1000 CE. San Antonio Museum of Art

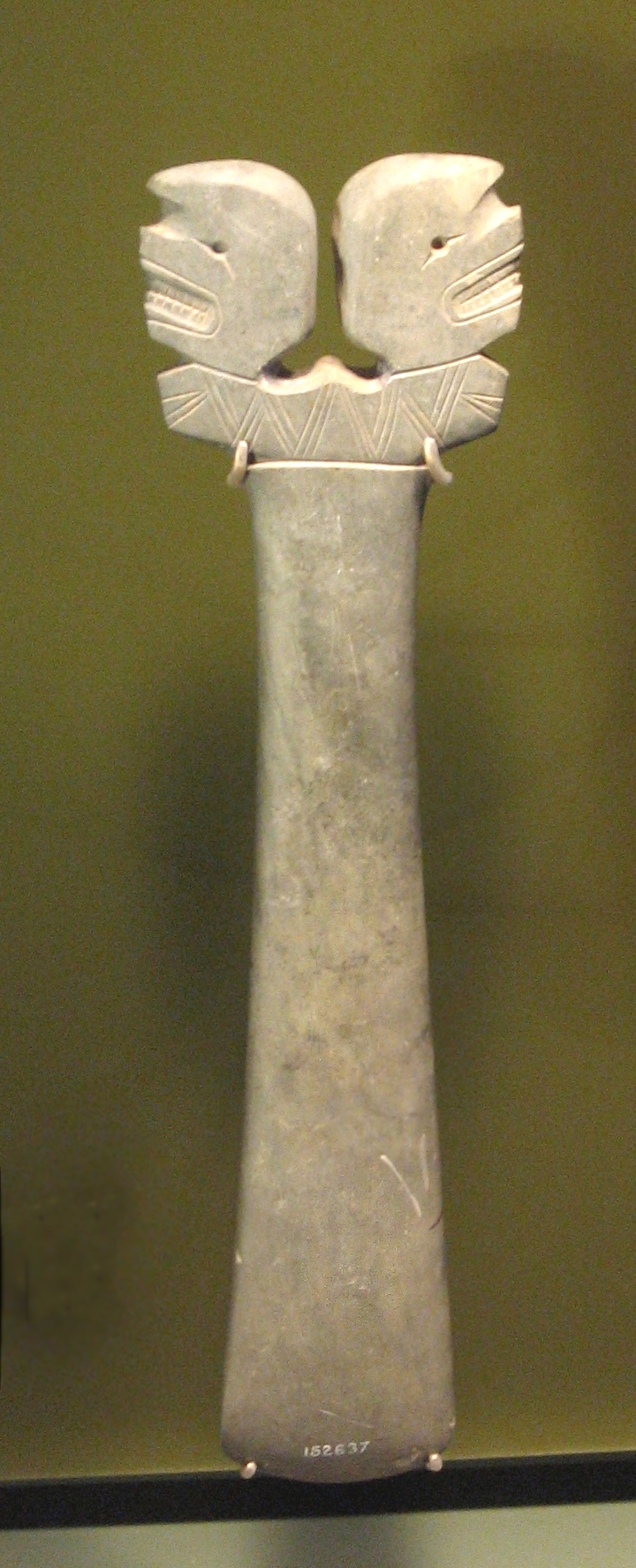
Tairona greenstone staff, 1550 - 1600 CE

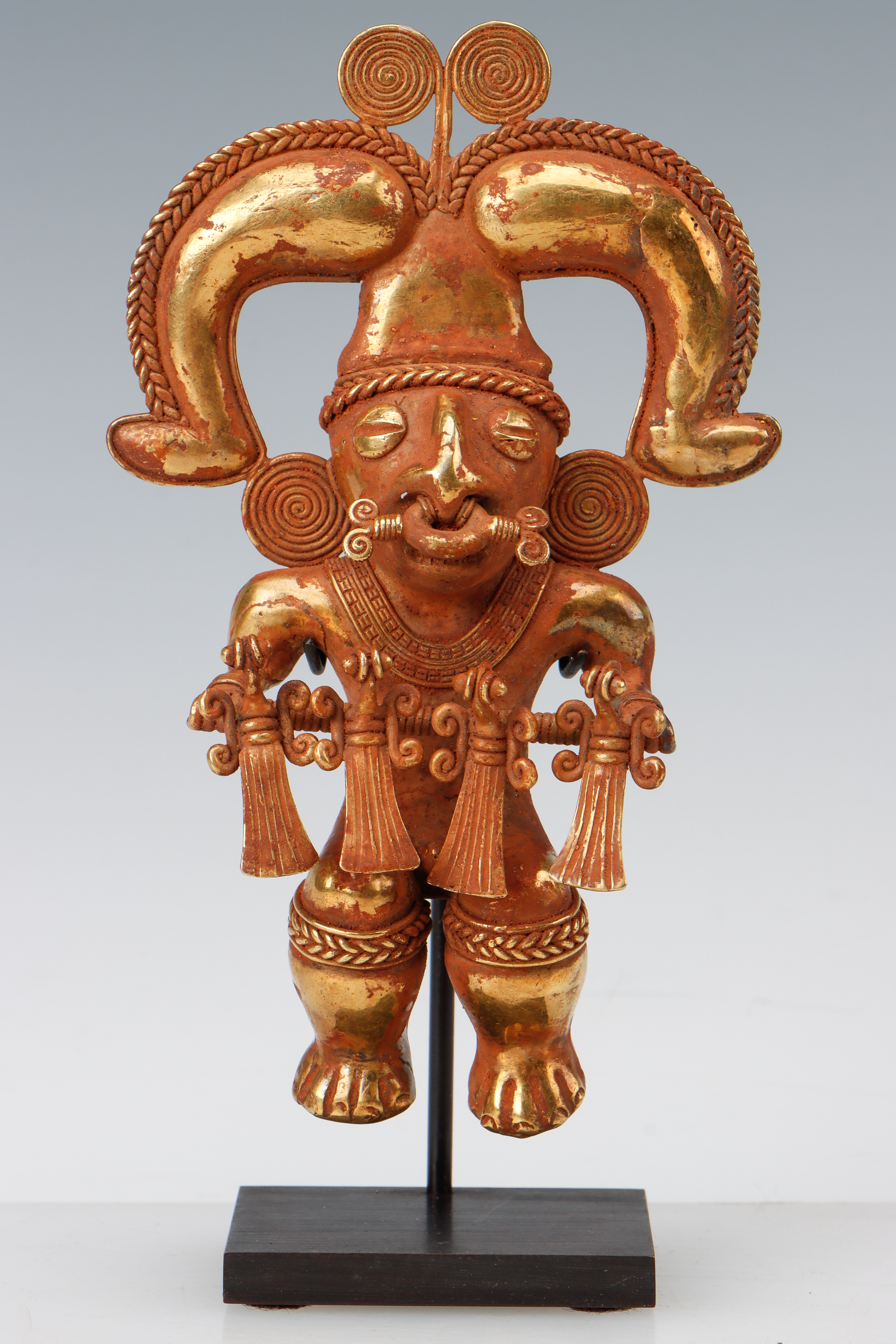
Ancient Tairona Ornament. Movable parts on the nose and hands. Museum-quality artefact - courtesy the Wovensouls collection.

== See also ==
- Kogi
- Muisca
- Ciudad Perdida
- El Dorado
