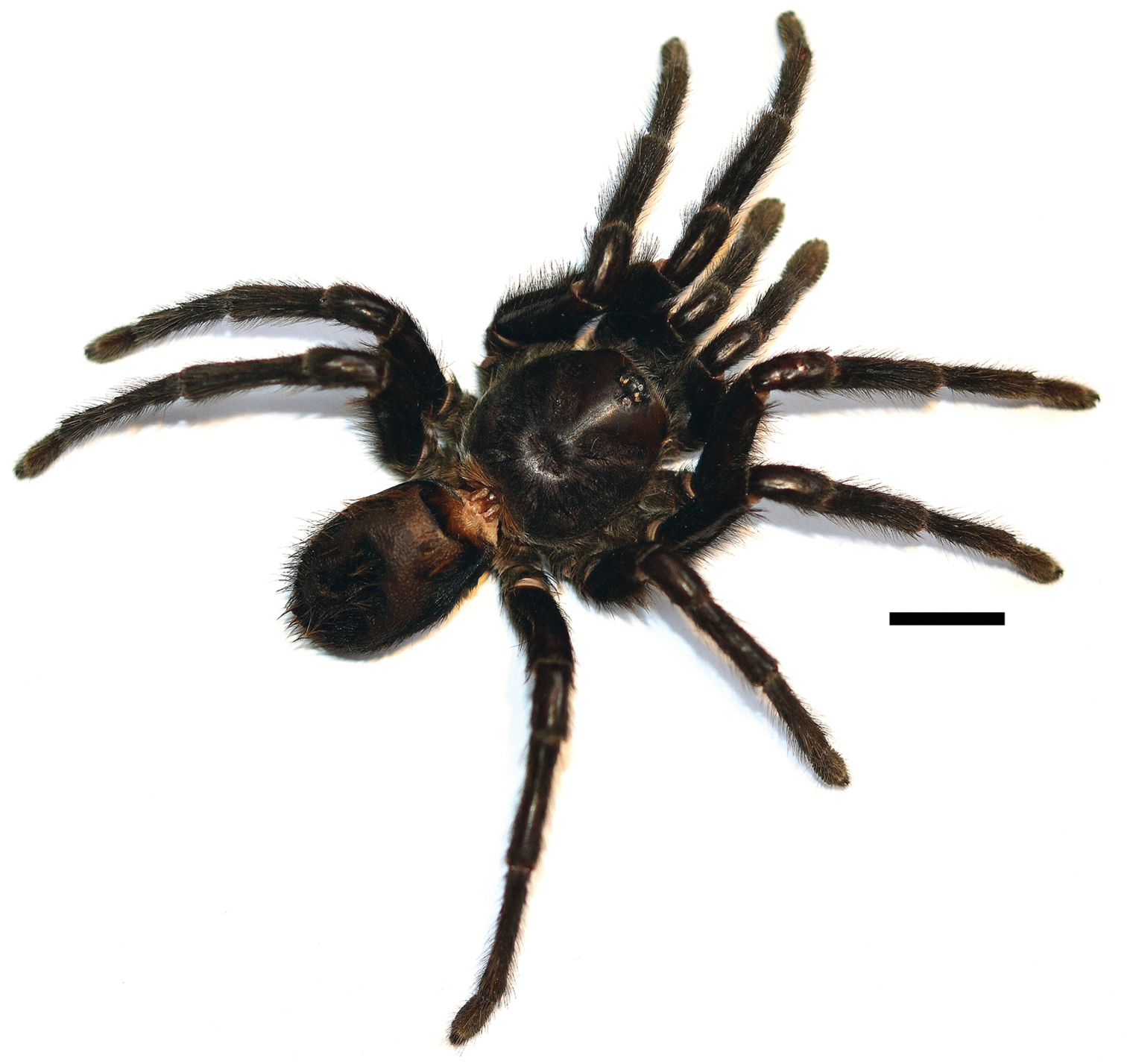
- Female Kankuamo marquezi (dorsal view)

Scientific classification
- Kingdom: Animalia
- Phylum: Arthropoda
- Subphylum: Chelicerata
- Class: Arachnida
- Order: Araneae
- Infraorder: Mygalomorphae
- Family: Theraphosidae
- Genus: Kankuamo; Perafán, Galvis & Pérez-Miles, 2016
- Species: K. marquezi

Binomial name
- Kankuamo marquezi Perafán, Galvis & Gutiérrez, 2016

= Kankuamo marquezi =

Species of spider

Kankuamo marquezi is the only species within the monotypic spider genus Kankuamo, in the family Theraphosidae. It is found in the Sierra Nevada de Santa Marta, Colombia. This spider has urticating hairs, the first to be classified as type VII. These sword-shaped, bristly hairs are used as a defense mechanism by stinging or stabbing. Most other species of tarantulas attack by throwing their hairs from a distance. Kankuamo hairs cover the entire body and have penetrating tips which will embed themselves into the skin or mucous membranes and cause severe irritation. Humans often experience mild to severe skin irritation or rashes.

== Taxonomy ==
The species Kankuamo marquezi and the new genus Kankuomo were first described in 2016 by Carlos Perafán et al. The genus name honors the indigenous Kankuamo people of the Caribbean region of Colombia, where this species is found. The grammatical gender of Kankuamo is neutral. The species name marquezi was given in honor of Nobel Prize-winning Colombian author Gabriel García Márquez, considered one of the most significant writers of the 20th century.

Perafán et al. placed the genus Kankuamo in the subfamily Theraphosinae. Based on a morphological phylogenetic analysis, the genus was most closely related to Metriopelma.

== Description ==
=== Abdominal urticating setae ===
Urticating hairs are used to differentiate between the subfamilies, genera and species of the family Theraphosidae (tarantulas). Prior to the discovery of Kankuamo marquezi, six different kinds of urticating hairs were known, varying in their morphology, ornamentation, length and releasing mechanism. Two types (II and V) were found in subfamily Aviculariinae, the other four types (I, III, IV and VI) in subfamily Theraphosinae.

A different type of urticating hair was found during the study of Kankuamo marquezi. The spider was covered with rust-colored bristles, including an unusual oval patch of sharp-tipped barbed hairs. Some lanceolated barbs are arranged with their tips towards the penetration tip of the hair, opposite to the main barbs. These unique urticating hairs were put in a new type of urticating hair, type VII. They were considered to have evolved to defend the spider against direct contact.

The action of type VII urticating hairs was first observed while handling the specimen in alcohol. The upper part of the tarantula's abdomen was touched intentionally and it was noticed that the urticating hair easily pierced the human finger. After further examination of the finger with stereoscope microscope, the setae were seen to be embedded in the skin, but none penetrated more than one-third of their length. When attempts were made to remove the setae, they were found to break easily from their distal end, leaving a remainder inside the tissue. The lanceolated barbs (in the reverse direction), which are present at the distal end of the setae, serve as a natural breaking point.

==== Urticating hair, type VII ====
It is different from the other types because of its insertion feature, as it contains a penetrating tip with the barbs in the reversed that aid embedding them in the targets.
Type VII is located in the dorsal of the abdomen intermixed with covering the setae and attached to the cuticle by thinner stalk that makes it easy to release. Length of the setae is 1122±40 μm and Width is 33±3 μm, length/width ratio is 34(n=10). Setae have a very sharp penetrating tip on its distal apex which is opposite to the stalk. The stalk of it is approximately 45±3 μm in length and 10±1 in width, which is larger than other urticating types. The main shaft is notably straight, which contains the main small barbs that extend along the whole setae. It also has a small oval patch of lanceolated reversed barbs near the penetrating tip.

=== Palpal bulb ===
Male spiders use palpal bulbs instead of a penis to transfer sperm to females. Males of this new species of Theraphosidae have a subconical palpal bulb with many conspicuous kneels distributed throughout the subtegulum and embolus, forming a completely unique pattern covered with zig-zag edges, which may resemble a musical instrument. These bulbs are especially developed on the dorsal and prolateral faces, most of them with serrated edges, additional dorsal kneels and supra-accessory kneels. The general shape of the palpal bulb resembles that of the genus Ami discovered in 2008, but with the subtegulum more elongated in Kankuamo.

Females are different from other genera in a way that they have spermathecae with one notched receptacle, two granulated lobes and several irregular sclerotized longitudinal striations.

== Distribution and habitat ==
Kankuamo marquezi inhabits Cuchilla San Lorenzo on the northwestern flank of the Sierra Nevada de Santa Marta, at an altitude of 2000 to 2300 m above sea level, in the lower montane wet forest ecozone. The location where it was found mainly consist of shrubs from the families Arecaceae and Chrysobalanaceae. The area is also inhabited by snakes of the genus Atractus and frogs of the genus Atelopus.
