= Guatapurí =

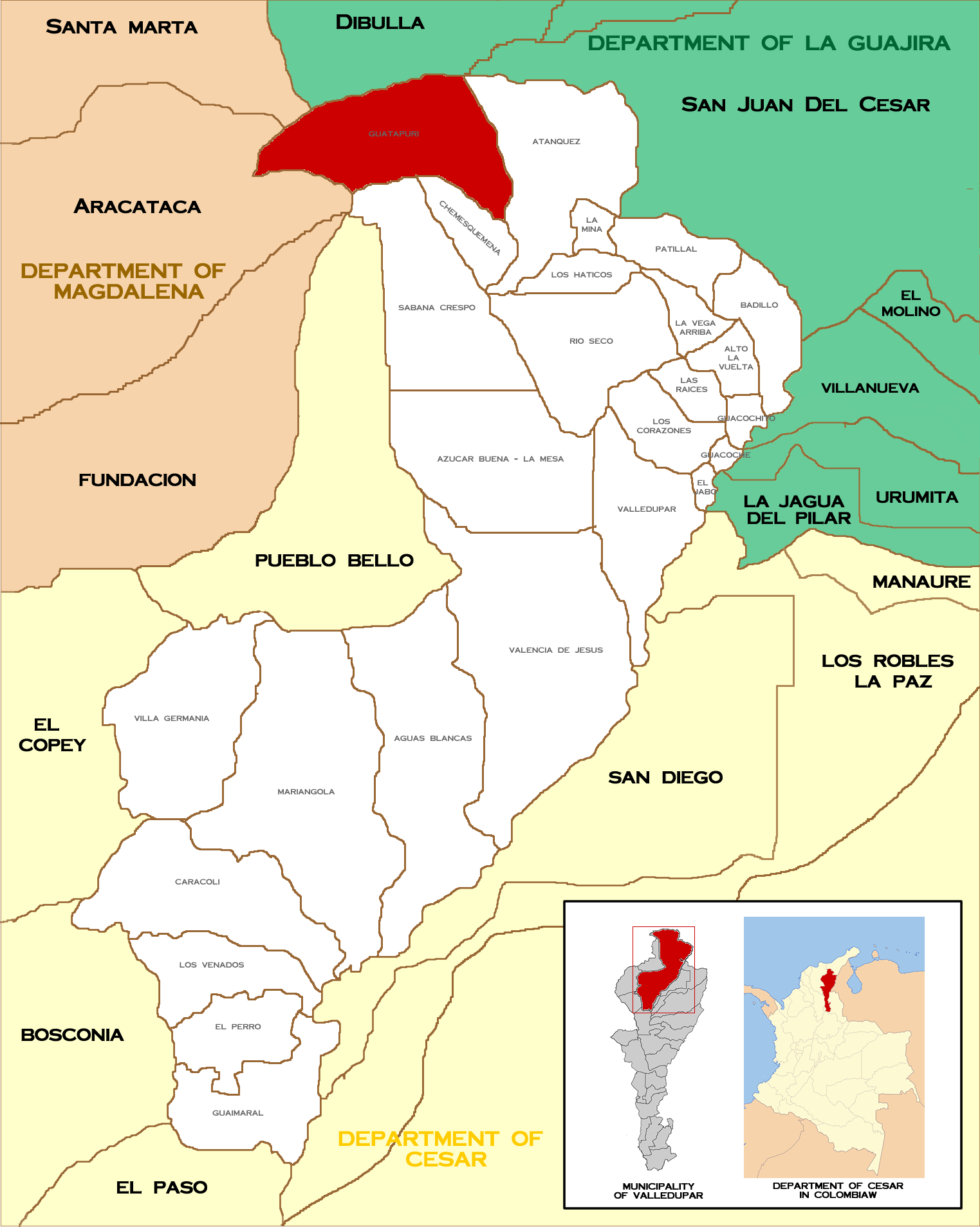
- Location in the municipality of Valledupar.
- Country: Colombia
- Department: Cesar
- Municipality: Valledupar
- Founded: Pre-Columbian

Government
  - Type: Corregimiento
- Time zone: UTC-5
- Website: www.atanquez.com

Guatapurí is a populated center of Colombia and corregimiento of Valledupar in the Department of Cesar. Atanquez is located on the Sierra Nevada de Santa Marta mountain range at approximately 2,000 m over the sea level. Guatapurí is known for being predominantly inhabited by the indigenous ethnic group Kankuamos among others and mestizo groups.

== History ==
Historically, Guatapurí has been an area inhabited by the Arhuaco ethnic group, an Amerindian group. The name Guatapurí meaning "cold water" gives the name to the river that passes through its territory; the Guatapuri River.

== Economy ==
The economy of Guatapurí is based on agriculture and the production of indigenous art crafts. The main products are panela, liquor from maize and sugar cane, fique, production of medicinal plants, local fruits and vegetables, Cacao and coffee which is commercialize in Valledupar.
