= Kankuamo language =

Extinct Chibchan language of Colombia

Kankuamo
- Cancuamo
- Native to: Colombia
- Ethnicity: Kankuamo, Atanque
- Extinct: after 1932
- Language family: Chibchan: Arwako–Chimila; Arwako; Kankuamo

Language codes
- ISO 639-3: None (mis)
- Glottolog: kank1244

Kankuamo, also known as Kakatukua, Kampanake, Atanques or Atanque, is an extinct Chibchan language of Colombia, once spoken in the area of Sierra Nevada de Santa Marta.

It was spoken on the southeastern slope of the Sierra Nevada de Santa Marta, in the communities of the Atánquez district. Although the language of the Kankuamo is nearly extinct and the Kankuamo communicate mainly in Spanish, tradition holds that speakers of the native language can still be found in the páramos, especially among some elders and mamos (spiritual leaders).

With the collaboration of members of the Kankuamo community, as well as other indigenous people of the Sierra with knowledge of this language, and with the support of experts, written materials are being developed to promote its dissemination among children and young people.

== Phonology ==
=== Vowels ===
Kankuamo vowel phonemes
	Front	Central	Back
Close	i		u
Mid	e	ə	o
Open		a	

=== Consonants ===
Kankuamo consonant phonemes
		Labial	Dental/ Alveolar	Palatal	Velar	Glottal
Stop	Voiceless		t	tʃ	k	
Stop	Voiced	b	d	dʒ ⟨J⟩	g	
Fricative	Voiceless		s	ʃ	x	h
Fricative	Voiced			ʒ		
Nasal		m	n	ɲ		
Continuant		w		j		
Lateral			l			
Trill			r / r			

== Vocabulary ==
There is very little information about the language, in particular with regard to grammar. Before its speakers switched to Spanish, Celedón (1892) managed to compile a brief dictionary. The following table shows a sample of the lexicon.

gloss	Celedón	Wavrin
one	ijkua	hiskwa
two	moga	moga
three	ména	me̱wa
head	chakúku	c̈akna
eye	úma	hu̱mE
nose	michiuña	muc̈iñi
ear	kukkuá	kwükwü
tooth	köhka	khükhü
man	ferúa	teru̱a
woman	amia	akmi̱a
water	dita	ditáʼ
fuego	guié	ghié
earth	nebinyàku	kwi
fish	uáka	gẅa̱ku
tree	kandina	Xä
sun	koköbúnyo	bonju
moon	sakaméru	sakné̱ru

Despite being so poorly attested, Kankuamo clearly belongs to the Arwako subgroup of Chibcha. In particular, it appears to be very close to Wiwa in terms of phonetic innovations.

== Toponyms ==
Traces of Kankuamo are also preserved in toponyms recorded in the region of Sierra Nevada. Suffixes like -ka "place, site" (e.g. in Susungá-ka, Chingá-ka, Kankuá-ka) or -kua "bower" (e.g. in Birintu-kua, Risátu-kua, Kamíntu-kua) are diagnostic of a Kankuamo source.
