= Damana people =

Indigenous Colombian ethnic group

Damana
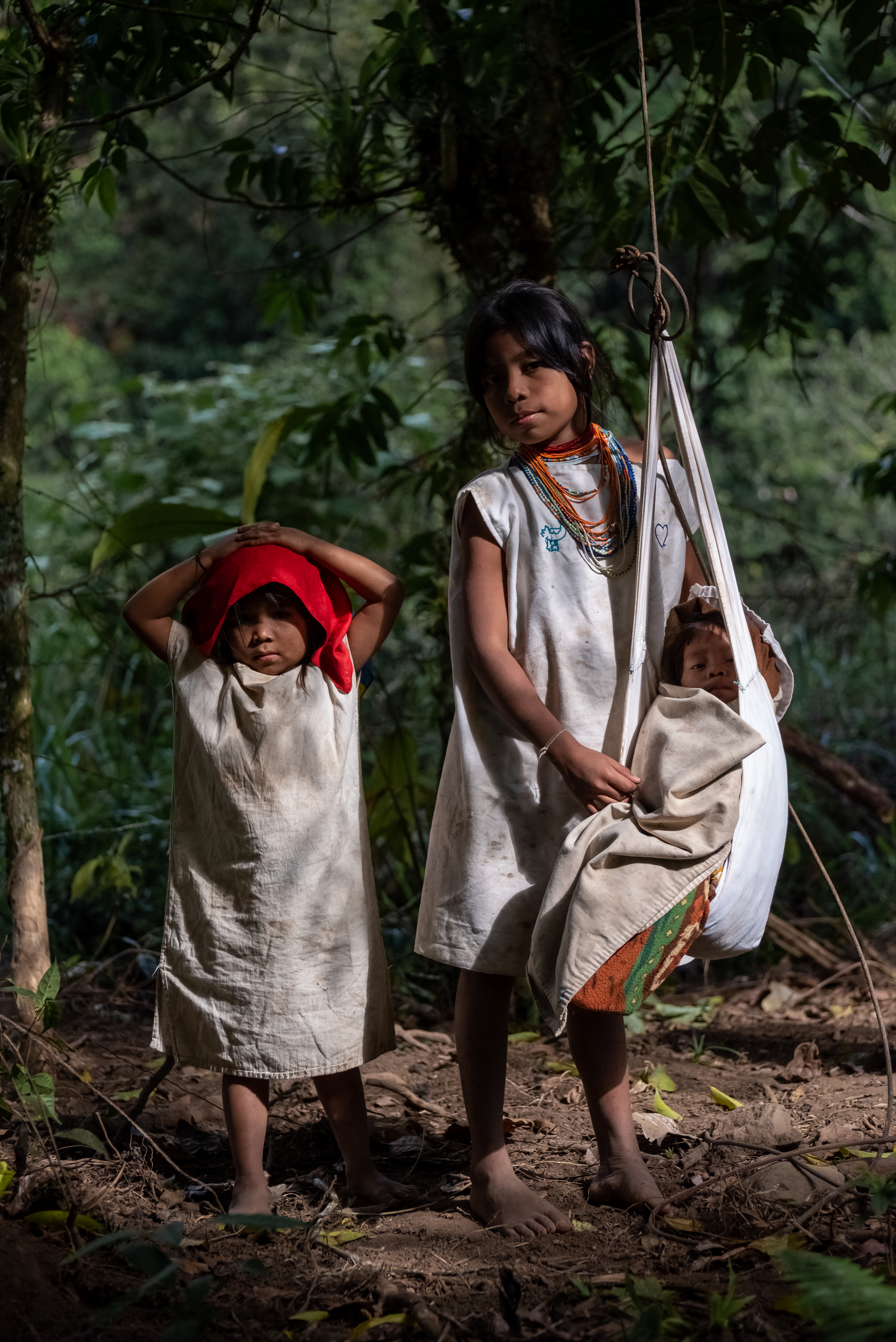
- Three male Damana children near Ciudad Perdida (2021)

Total population
- 18,202 (2018, census)

Regions with significant populations
- Sierra Nevada de Santa Marta, Cesar Department, La Guajira Department, Valledupar, Santa Marta

Languages
- Damana, Colombian Spanish, Kagaba

Religion
- Shamanism

Related ethnic groups
- Arhuaco, Kogi, Kankuamo

The Damana (Dʉmʉna) people, also known as the Wiwa, are an Indigenous people of Colombia that speak the Chibchan Damana language and live in the Sierra Nevada de Santa Marta region.

== Etymology ==
The word Wiwa comes from the Dʉmʉna language, wi meaning warm or warm area and wa meaning people, combined to mean people of warm land. This refers to the Damana's historic inhabitance in the lower, warmer parts of the Sierra Nevada mountains. The Damana are also known as the Sajas, which means "Native" or "Indigenous", as opposed to Sintalu, meaning "foreign, non-Indigenous". The origin of the demonym Malayos is unclear, but it is also used. Other regional demonyms typical of Damana villages are: guamacas (from Guamaka), marocaseros (from Marokaso), and arsarios (from El Rosario).

== History ==
The Damana are direct descendants of the Tairona people.

== Territory ==
The historical Damana territory was in the Marokaso, El Rosario, and Guamaka regions, reaching into the flat lowlands. But, due to colonization and forced displacement, the Damana later migrated to higher lands, abandoning El Rosario (later called La Sierrita) and Marokaso. Their land, located in the Sierra Nevada de Santa Marta mountain region, is between the basins of the northern Guachaca River and the southwestern Frío River in northern Colombia. They live between 900 and 2,500 metres (3,000 and 8,200 ft) above sea level in the mountains.

The territories in which the Damana people currently reside are within the Cesar, La Guajira, and Magdalena Departments. A significant population of Damana people have resided in the Magdalena Department since the early 1980s after Mamo Ramón Gil Barros was able to recover ancestral Damana territory. In Magdalena, they occupy the villages of Gotsezhi, Kemakumake, Kalabangaga, Wimake, Tolezhi, and Rumangaga.

The main Damana villages are now Avingüe, Cherúa, Sinkujka, Surimena, Ahuyamal (munduguatjkua), Pozo de Humo, Siminke, Sabanas de Juaquina (Kuasalamena), and Bernaka in Cesar, as well as Rinconal, Naranjal, Marokaso, and Potrerito in La Guajira.

Many villages are located within the Kogui Malay Arhuaco Reservation (RKMA), an indigenous reservation recognized by the state. Together with the Arhuaco, Kankuamo and Kogui peoples, some Damana live on the Sierra Nevada de Gonawindua territory in Santa Marta. In the Serranía del Perijá mountains in the Becerril municipality of Cesar, Damana inhabit the Campo Alegre Reservation.

=== Parque Tayrona ===
The Damana people are among the four Indigenous groups who historically inhabited Tayrona National Natural Park in Santa Marta and now live in the areas surrounding it. While they have decided to not inhabit the park itself due to the high concentration of outside people who come and go, some work and gather materials in the park.

=== Displacement ===
In early 2024, alarms were raised by various human rights group operating Colombia about ongoing forced displacement of Damana people in the Rancheria River basin by right-wing paramilitary groups, the Conquering Self-Defense Forces of the Sierra Nevada (ACS) and the Clan del Golfo (AGC), and conflict.

== Population ==
Their settlements are composed of dispersed rectangular single-family houses located in the foothills and valleys of the Sierra mountains. These villages are ceremonial and ritual centers, with their meetings being held in homes, where stories and advice of the mamos are heard.

The 2018 Colombian National Census put the Damana population at 18,202 people, making them the 6th least populated Indigenous group surveyed.

According to the Ministry of Culture of Colombia, in 2010 the Damana had "a population of 13,627 persons - 6,872 being men and 6,755 being women -. Of these, 12,803 resided in rural areas and 824 in urban areas. The bulk of the population is composed of children, youth, and young adults (79% under the age of 30), while adults older than 60 are a small number of people(2%)."

They have formed the Wiwa Yugumaiun Bunkuanarrua Tayrona Organization (OWYBT) at the Cesar Department level to be represented in the rest of society. In La Guajira, they are represented by the Wiwa Golkushe Tayrona Organization (OWGT). They also meet with authorities of three other groups of the Sierra: Kogui, Arhuaco, and Kankuamo to coordinate the defense of their territory within the línea negra, which demarcates the Sierra and the four groups in charge of taking care of it.

== Culture ==
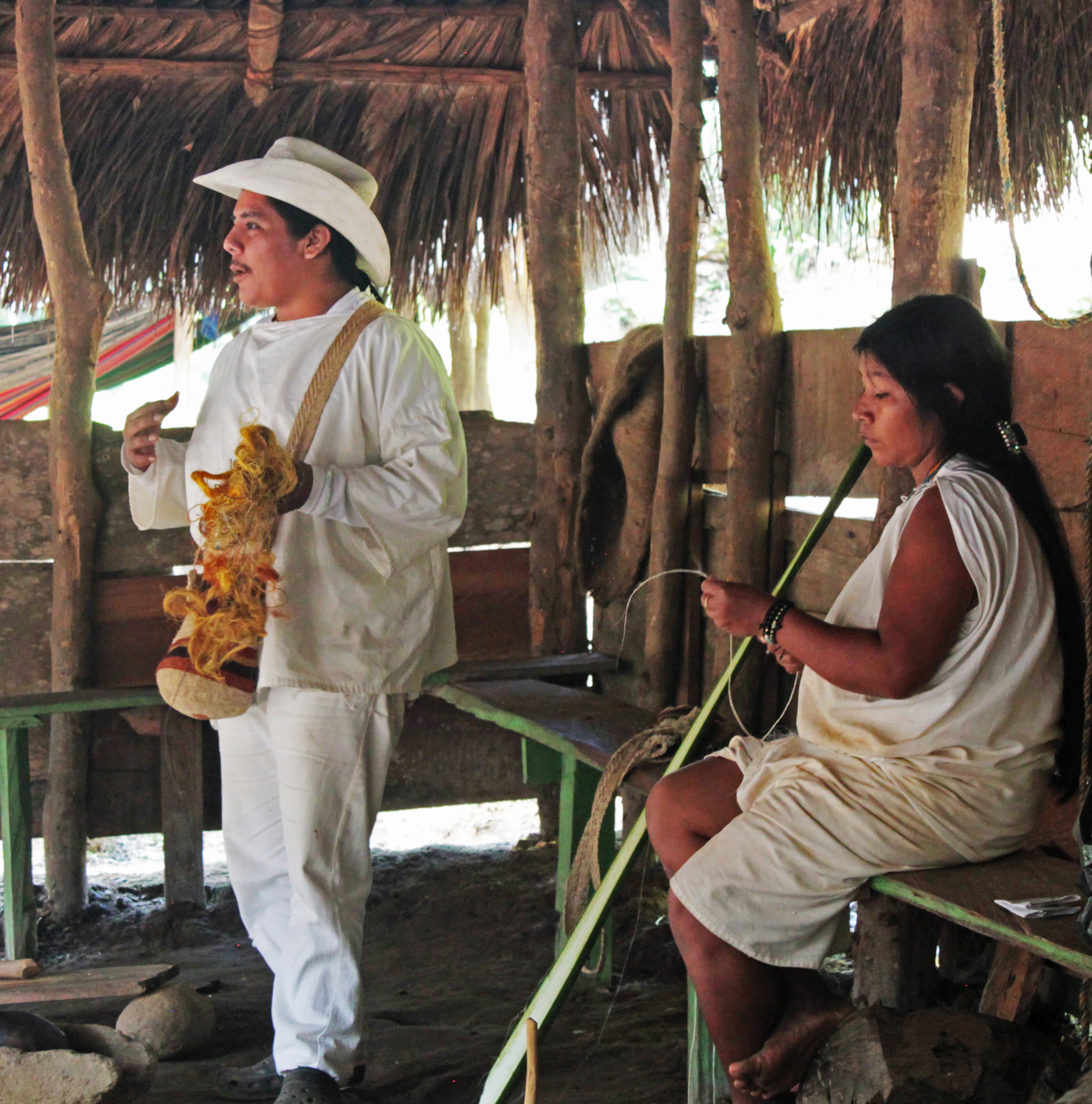
A Damana man and woman in the Sierra Nevada de Santa Marta

=== Mamos and sagas ===
The traditional male Damana spiritual and political authorities are called mamos and the female equivalent sagas. Their influence is present in the daily lives and important events of the community, whom they advise individually, in meetings, and in angag+k+n talks.

Mamo means sun,^{:4} grandfather, and counselor and saga means moon,^{:4} grandmother, and counselor. Both leaders receive a special education to learn about the Creator, understand nature, society, and people, heal, interpret dreams, and direct ceremonies and rituals. Training to become a Mamo begins at an early age and takes years of dedication.

The mamos, in addition to being spiritual leaders, fulfill the functions of a doctor, as every person in the community who gets sick is attended to by him. For many people, they are considered the wisest people in the community.

=== Traditional clothing ===
Damana men dress in white pants (ganz~~u~~rra), white tea shirts made by Damana women (shamarra), and hats. Damana woman dress in blanket ponchos that they make by hand with textiles, and a sash (yina). Male children and teenagers dress in a white coat or tunic that reaches their knees, with a small backpack that they carry at all times on their shoulder. Just like the male children, female children and adolescents dress in a tunic, but it is typically longer, reaching the ankles.

== Agricultural system and economy ==
The Damana are farmers that grow and cultivate yuca, ñame (a type of yam), malanga, bananas, corn, bean, coca, and sugarcane/panela, for family consumption and coffee (coffea arabica) for commerce. They also produce fique, whose fiber they make hammocks and suzu backpacks with. The men wear carry cross with duadu backpacks, made of home-spun cotton. The women make the clothes, although they usually acquire the fabric from Kogui people, and the men make hats. They hunt iguanas, rabbits, rodents, and birds. They collect shells in order to extract their lime which is required for the traditional consumption of coca.

== Language ==
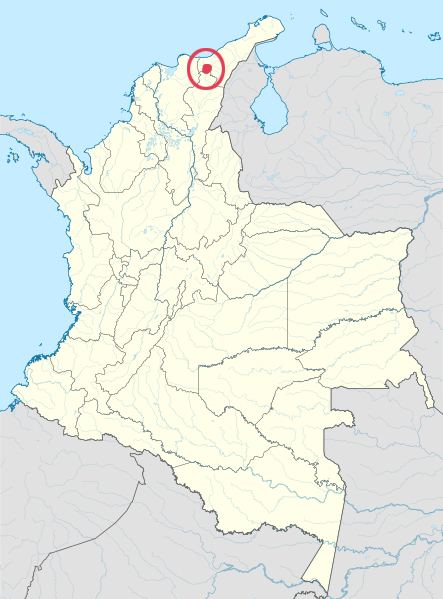
Map of the Damana language in Colombia

The native language of the Damana is Dʉmʉna, also known as Malayo, Wiwa, or Guamaka; It belongs to the Chibchan language family and is spoken by more than one thousand people. According to a 2008 survey conducted by the Colombian Ministry of Culture, 60% of the Damana people spoke Damana well, 3% understood but did not speak it, 7.7% spoke and understood it little, and 28.2% neither spoke nor understood the language.

The Damana language has seven vowel phonemes and nineteen consonant phonemes.

=== Trilingualism ===
Due to the transposition of the Damana and Kogui territory that has characterized the past decades, part of both peoples speak each other's languages. In addition, a large part of the Damana population speaks Spanish. This means it's relatively common for Damana to be trilingual.

== Legal recognition ==
On July 11th, 2024 Colombia's Special Jurisdiction for Peace (JEP) officially recognized the Damana as victims of international crimes ineligible for amnesty in Colombia. This action was a part of the larger macro-case 09, with the ultimate goal of prosecuting and sanctioning those responsible for crimes against Indigenous groups of Colombia during the Colombian conflict.

== See also ==
- Damana language
- Indigenous people of Colombia
- Musica
