= Damana language =

Chibchan language spoken in Colombia

Damana
- Wiwa, Malayo
- Dʉmʉna
- Native to: Colombia
- Region: Sierra Nevada de Santa Marta
- Ethnicity: Damana people
- Native speakers: 1,850 (2007)
- Language family: Chibchan: Arwako–Chimila; Arwako; Damana

Language codes
- ISO 639-3: mbp
- Glottolog: mala1522
- ELP: Guamaca
- Linguasphere: 81-EDC-aa
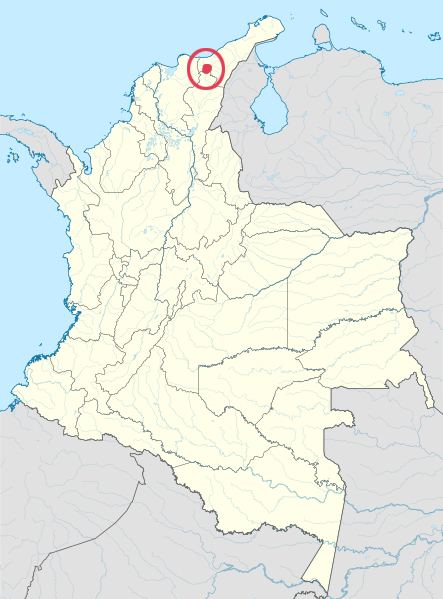

Damana (also known as Malayo or Wiwa) is a Chibchan language spoken by the Indigenous Damana people on the southern and eastern slopes of Sierra Nevada de Santa Marta in northern Colombia. According to Ethnologue, it was spoken by 1,850 people in 2007; however, according to the Colombian Ministry of Culture, there were 13,627 Damana people in 2010, of whom some 60% speak Dʉmʉna well.

== Alternative names ==
Other alternative names include Damana, Malayo, Wiwa, Arosario, Arsario, Guamaca, Guamaka, Maracasero, Marocasero, Sancá, Sanja, Sanka, and Wamaka.

== Phonology ==
=== Vowels ===
There are seven phonemic vowels in Damana:

Vowel phonemes
	Front	Central	Back
Close	i	ɨ	u
Mid	e	ə	o
Open		a	

=== Consonants ===
Damana has 19 phonemic consonants:

Consonant phonemes
	Labial		Dental/ Alveolar		Palatal		Velar		Glottal
Nasal		m		n					
Stop	p	b	t	d	tʃ	dʒ	k	g	
Fricative			s	z	ʃ	ʒ			h
Flap				ɾ					
Trill				r					
Continuant		w		l					
