= Department Secretaries of Cesar Department =

Regional government bureaucrat in Spain

The Department Secretaries of Cesar Department (Spanish: Secretarias departamental del Departamento del Cesar) are the secretaries in charge of supporting the functions of the Governor of Cesar Department on specific areas.

== Secretaries ==
- Secretary of Government of Cesar Department (Spanish: Secretaria de Gobierno del departamento del Cesar)
- Secretary of Finances of Cesar Department (Spanish: Secretaria de Hacienda del departamento del Cesar)
- Secretary of Health of Cesar Department (Spanish: Secretaria de Salud del departamento del Cesar)
- Secretary General of Cesar Department (Spanish: Secretaria General del departamento del Cesar)
- Secretary of Mines of Cesar Department (Spanish: Secretaria de Minas del departamento del Cesar)
- Secretary of Infrastructure and Public Works of Cesar Department (Spanish: Secretaria Infraestructura y Obras)
- Office of Planning (Spanish: Oficina asesora de planeacion)
- Office of Judicial Affairs (Spanish: Oficina asesora de asuntos juridicos)
- Secretary of General Management (Spanish: Secretaria de Gestion General)
- Secretary of Education, Culture and Sports (Spanish: Secretaria de Educacion, Cultura y Deporte)
- Secretary of Agriculture and Entrepreneurship (Spanish: Secretaria de Agricultura y Desarrollo Empresarial)

== See also ==
- Government of Cesar Department
- Governor of Cesar Department
