= Ciudad Perdida =

Rediscovered "lost city" in Colombia

- Teyuna, Buritaca-200
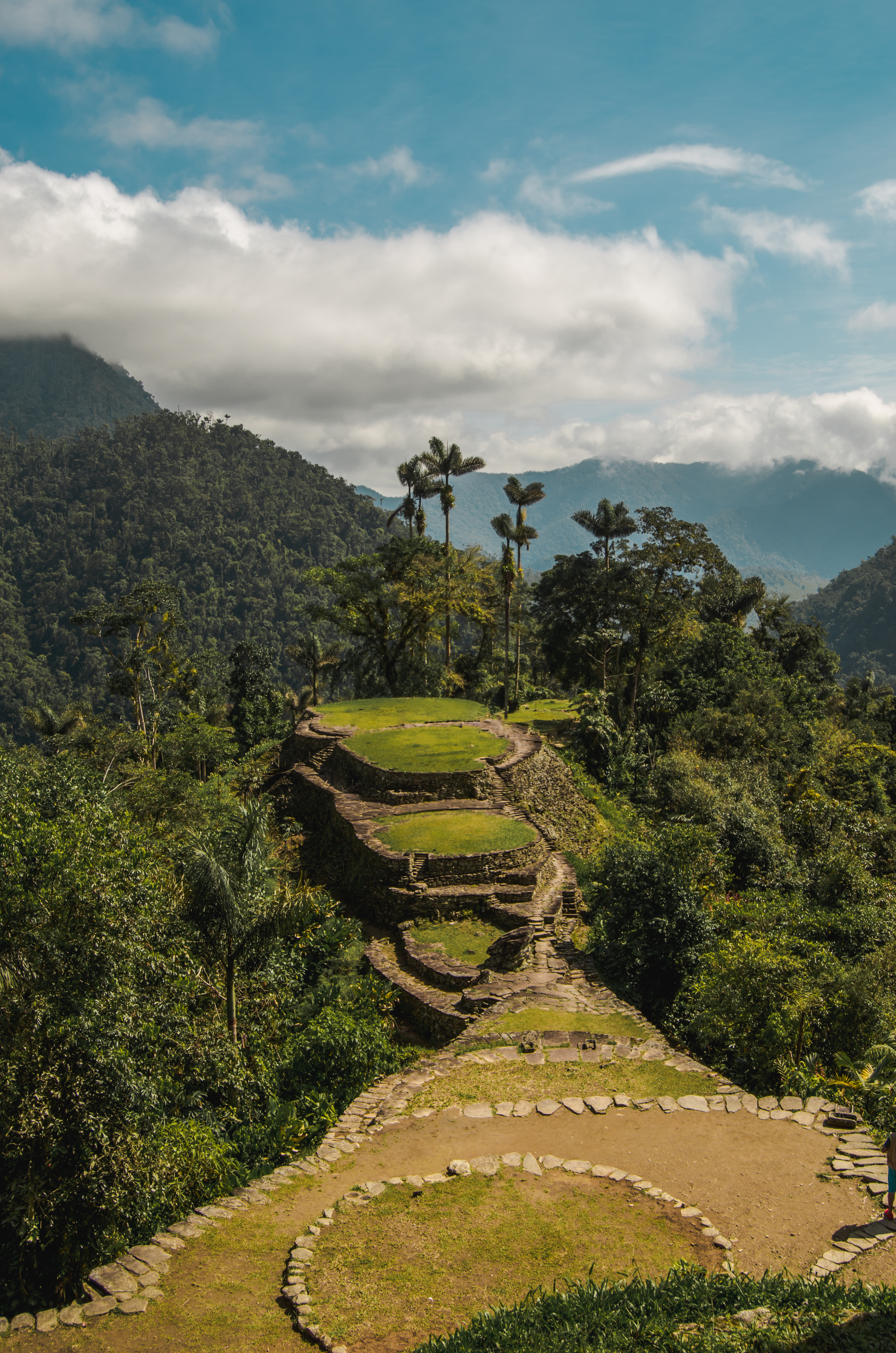
- View of the central area of the city. Wooden structures once stood on the stone platforms.

- Location within Colombia
- 11°2′16.79″N 73°55′30.69″W
- Type: Settlement
- Location: Santa Marta, Magdalena Department, Colombia
- Region: Sierra Nevada de Santa Marta

Ciudad Perdida (Spanish for "lost city"; also known as Teyuna and Buritaca-200) is the archaeological site of an ancient city in the Sierra Nevada de Santa Marta of Colombia, within the jurisdiction of the municipality of Santa Marta. This city is believed to have been founded about 800 AD. If so, Ciudad Perdida predates Machu Picchu by about 650 years. It was built by the Tairona.

Ciudad Perdida consists of a series of 169 terraces carved into the mountainside, a network of tiled roads, and several small circular plazas. The entrance can be accessed only by climbing up 1,200 stone steps through dense jungle.

== Modern discovery ==
Ciudad Perdida was discovered in 1972 by Los Sepúlvedas, a group of local treasure looters.

Los Sepúlvedas were a small family of looters living in Colombia. The family often went hunting in the forests, and one day they shot a "pava" presumably a Band-tailed Guan. While retrieving the bird, they noticed it had fallen on a series of stone steps rising up the mountainside. They climbed up the stone steps and discovered an abandoned city, which they named "Green Hell" or "Wide Set". After the murder of one of the Sepúlveda sons at the site of Ciudad Perdida, fights broke out among the looters.

Soon after, gold figures and ceramic urns from Ciudad Perdida began to appear on the local black market. This alerted archaeologists, and a team led by the director of the Instituto Colombiano de Antropología, reached the site in 1976. The site was reconstructed between 1976 and 1982.

Although La Ciudad Perdida is an impressive site, it is not the only one of its kind. Only about 30–40% of the sites in the Sierra Nevada region have been explored. However, thanks to recent widespread lidar access, more and more of these sites are being discovered.

Members of local tribes – notably the Kogi people – have stated that they visited the site of Ciudad Perdida regularly before it was widely reported, but had kept quiet about it. They call the city "Teyuna" and believe it was the heart of a network of villages inhabited by their forebears, the Tairona.

== History ==
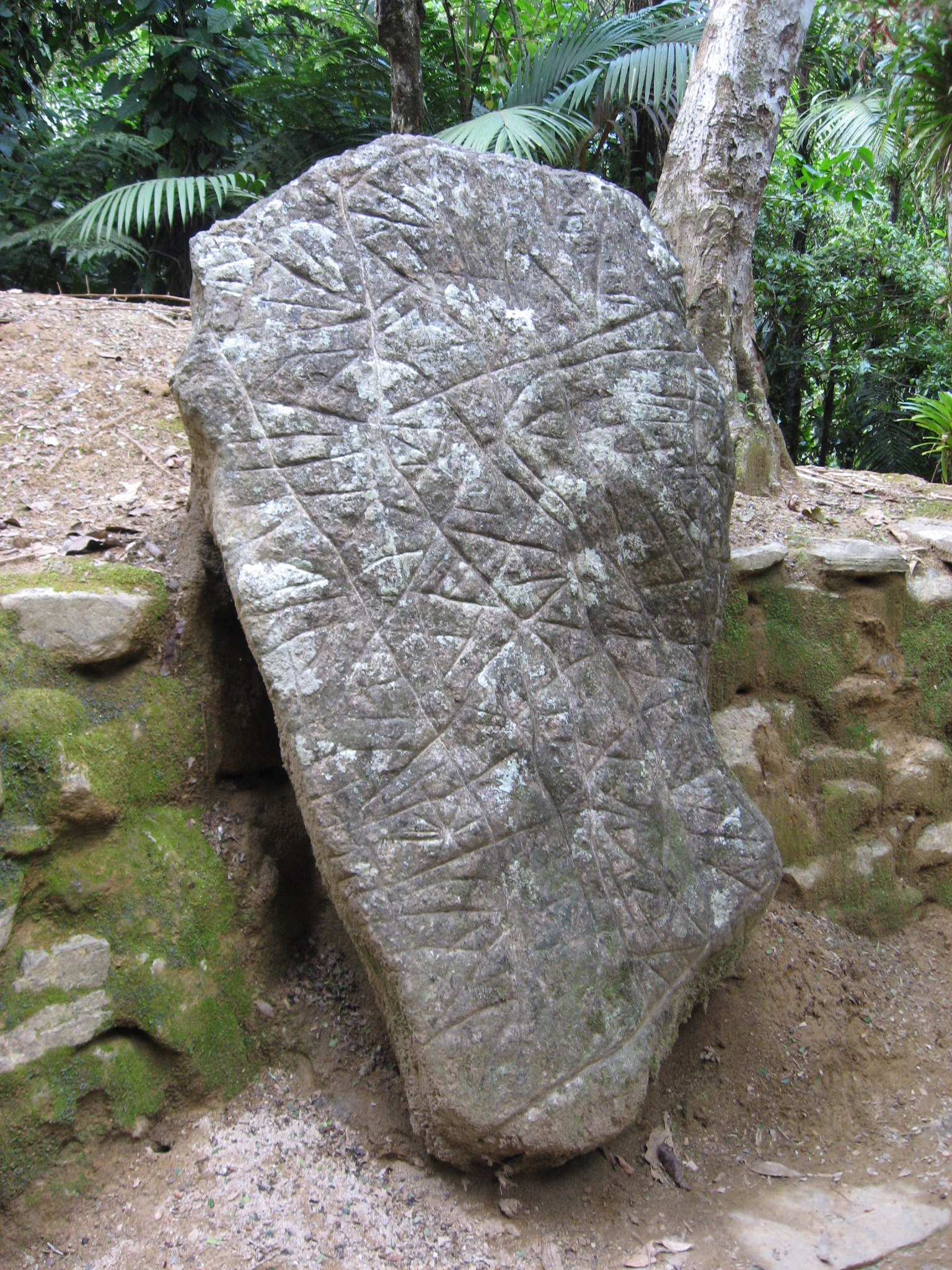
Boulder with carved markings, believed to be a map of Ciudad Perdida and paths connecting it to the larger area

Built around 800 CE, Ciudad Perdida was most likely the region's political and manufacturing center on the Buritaca River and may have housed 2,000–8,000 people. The site was originally inhabited by the Tairona people. According to the Kogi people, who are some of the last preserved indigenous descendants of the Tairona, the Tairona lived for thousands of years, up until the age of the Spanish conquistadors.

The Tairona people were forced to flee from La Ciudad Perdida sometime in the 16th century, after years of trade and conflict.

== Armed conflict ==
The area around Ciudad Perdida was affected by the Colombian armed conflict between the Colombian National Army, right-wing paramilitary groups, and left-wing guerrilla groups like the National Liberation Army (ELN) and Revolutionary Armed Forces of Colombia (FARC).

During the decades of the 1980s and 1990s, due to the boom of drug traffic and contraband, FARC and ELN settled in the zone, creating routes and armies and using forced taxation with the communities as well. During this time, a peace treaty with the government was in the making for demobilization; however, this allowed for other guerrilla groups that were not part of the treaty to get stronger and united; around the same time, right-wing paramilitary groups invaded the region El Mamey, in the north of Ciudad Perdida, creating instability in the area and a wave of violence between all armed forces. By the late 1990s, most of the territory was under the Colombian paramilitary group Autodefensas Unidas de Colombia (AUC).

On 15 September 2003, the ELN kidnapped eight foreign tourists visiting Ciudad Perdida, demanding a government investigation into human rights abuses in exchange for their hostages. The ELN released the last of the hostages three months later. The AUC continued attacking indigenous and non-indigenous individuals in the zone. In 2006, after a demobilization treaty, the damage done by the Colombian paramilitary group amounted to 8000 direct victims, around 274 violent deaths, and 1000 indirect victims.

== Resumed access ==
In the search to create, develop, plan, project, research, and protect the area with conservation and preservation plans, settlement of inter-institutional cooperation no. 008 was established between national parks (PNN) and the Colombian Institute of Anthropology and History (ICANH); this Indigenous management plan model allows Colombian Sierra Nevada and the Indigenous populations to receive environmental, regional, and international benefits. PNN has developed ecotourism strategies to preserve natural resources in accordance with the "parques con la gente" (parks with the people) policy for active social interaction. Nowadays, this has allowed for the inclusion of larger committees such as the Department of Commerce, Industry and Tourism, PNN, and the Indigenous reservation Kogui-Malayo-Arhuaco, in which they study the tourist occupancy in Teyuna "Ciudad Perdida," does not negatively impact any environmental and cultural aspect. Indigenous communities play an active role in decision-making about the territory due to the historical and ancestral value of preserving their past heritage.

In 2005, tourist hikes became operational again and there have been no problems since then. The Colombian Army actively patrols the area, which is now deemed to be safe for visitors, and there have not been any more kidnappings.

Since 2009, the non-profit organization Global Heritage Fund (GHF) has been working in Ciudad Perdida to preserve and protect the historic site against climate, vegetation, neglect, looting, and unsustainable tourism. GHF's stated goals include the development and implementation of a regional management plan, documentation and conservation of the archaeological features at Ciudad Perdida, and engagement of the local indigenous communities as major stakeholders in the preservation and sustainable development of the site.

== Gallery ==
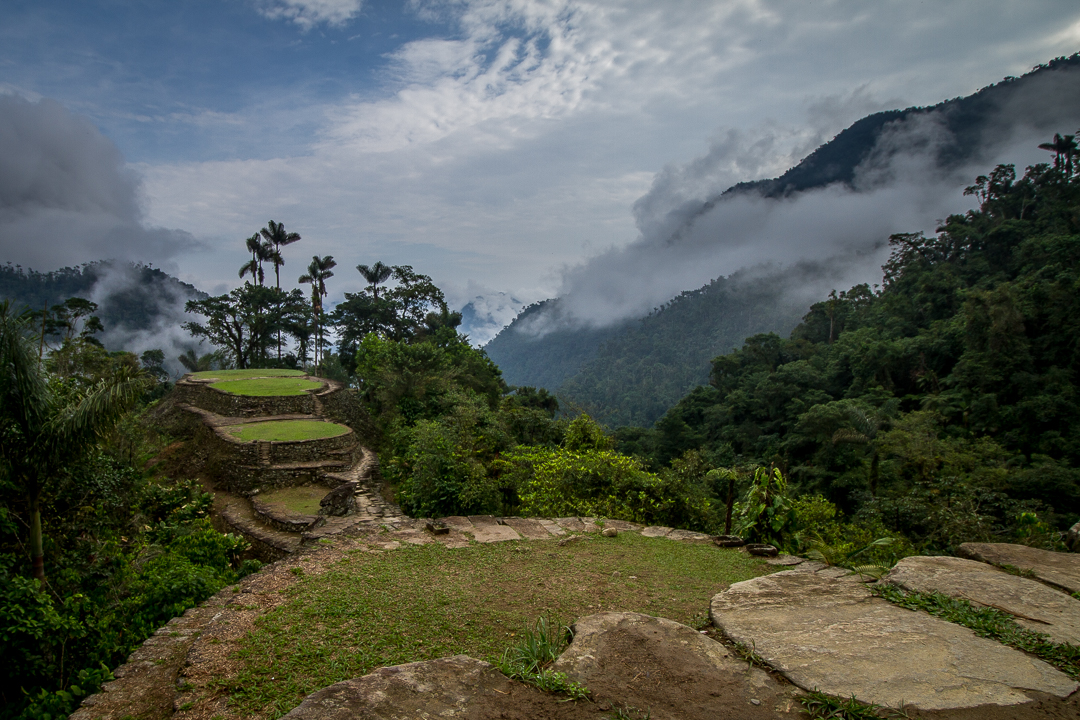
Overview of Ciudad Perdida

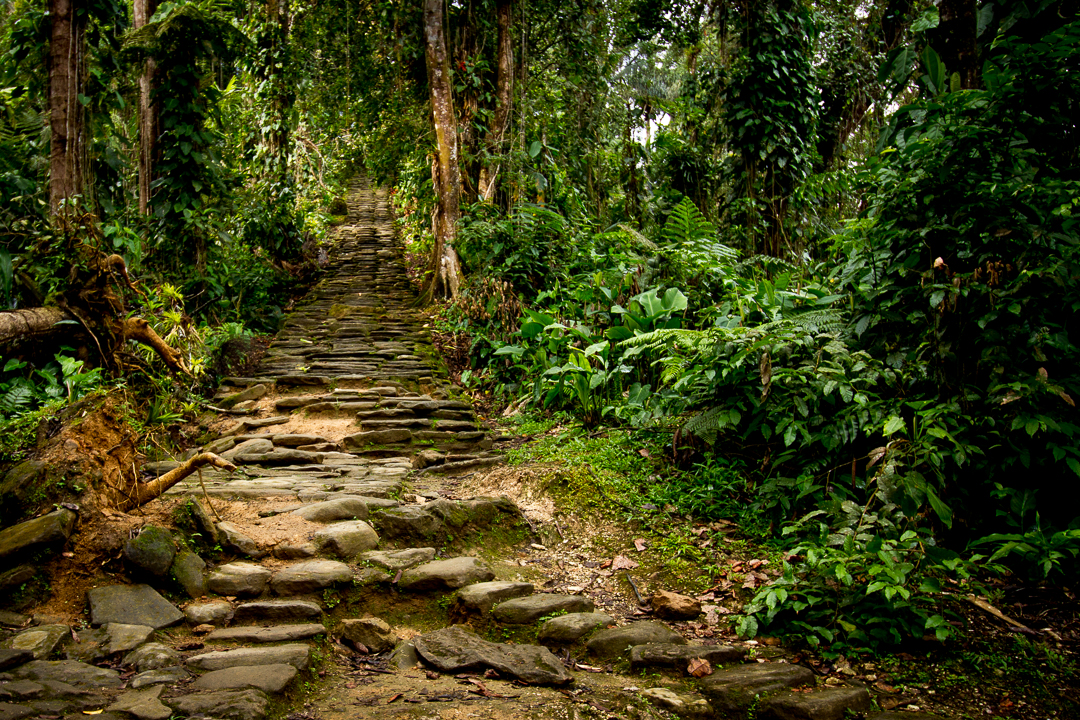
Section of the stone staircase that leads up from the river valley to Ciudad Perdida

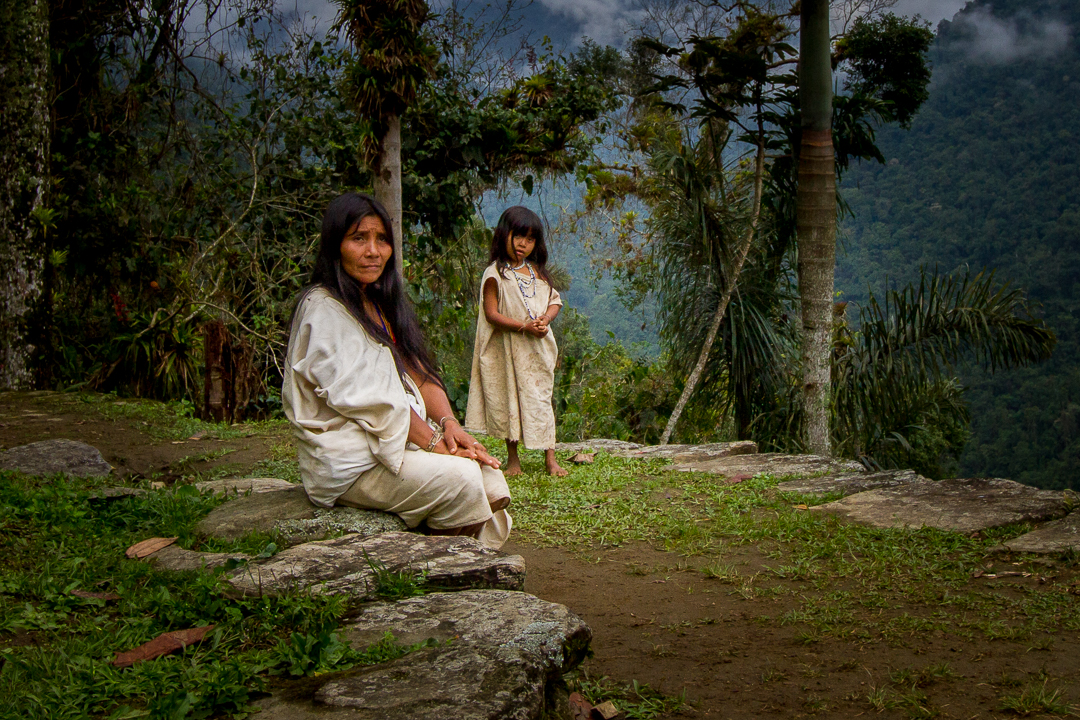
Portrait of a Koguis tribeswoman and child on a terrace at Ciudad Perdida

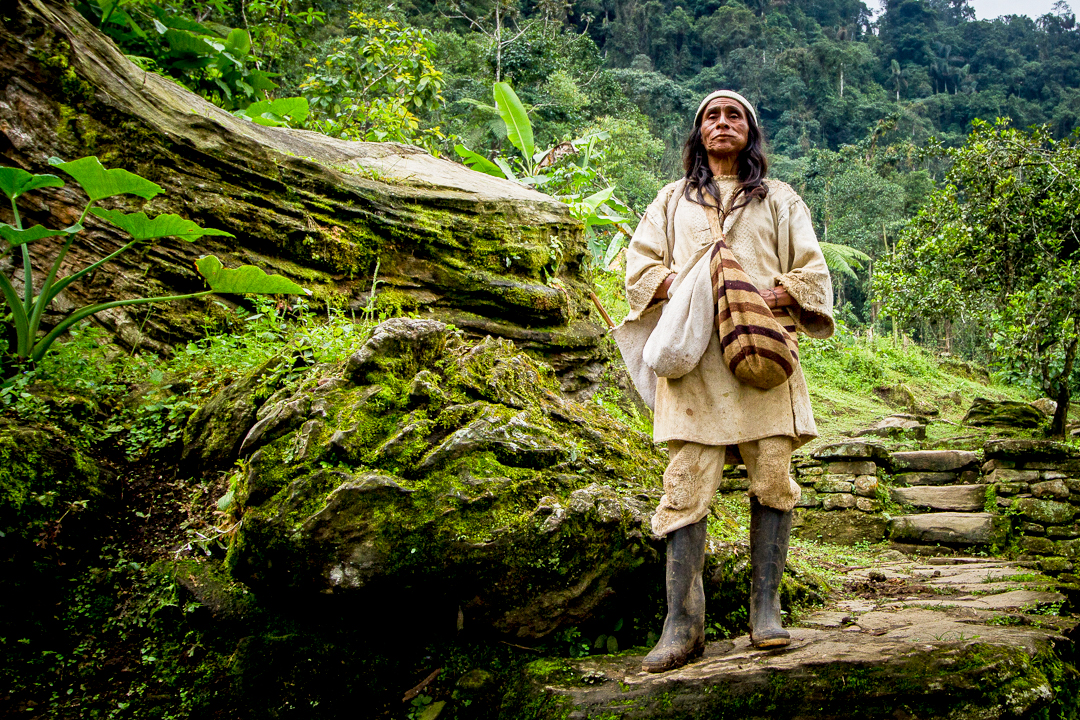
Portrait of a Koguis shaman at Ciudad Perdida
