= Kankuamo people =

Indigenous people of Colombia

Kankuamo
Total population
- 16,986 (2018)

Regions with significant populations
- Colombia (Sierra Nevada de Santa Marta)

Languages
- Spanish, formerly Sánha

Religion
- Traditional beliefs

Related ethnic groups
- Arhuaco, Wiwa, Kogui

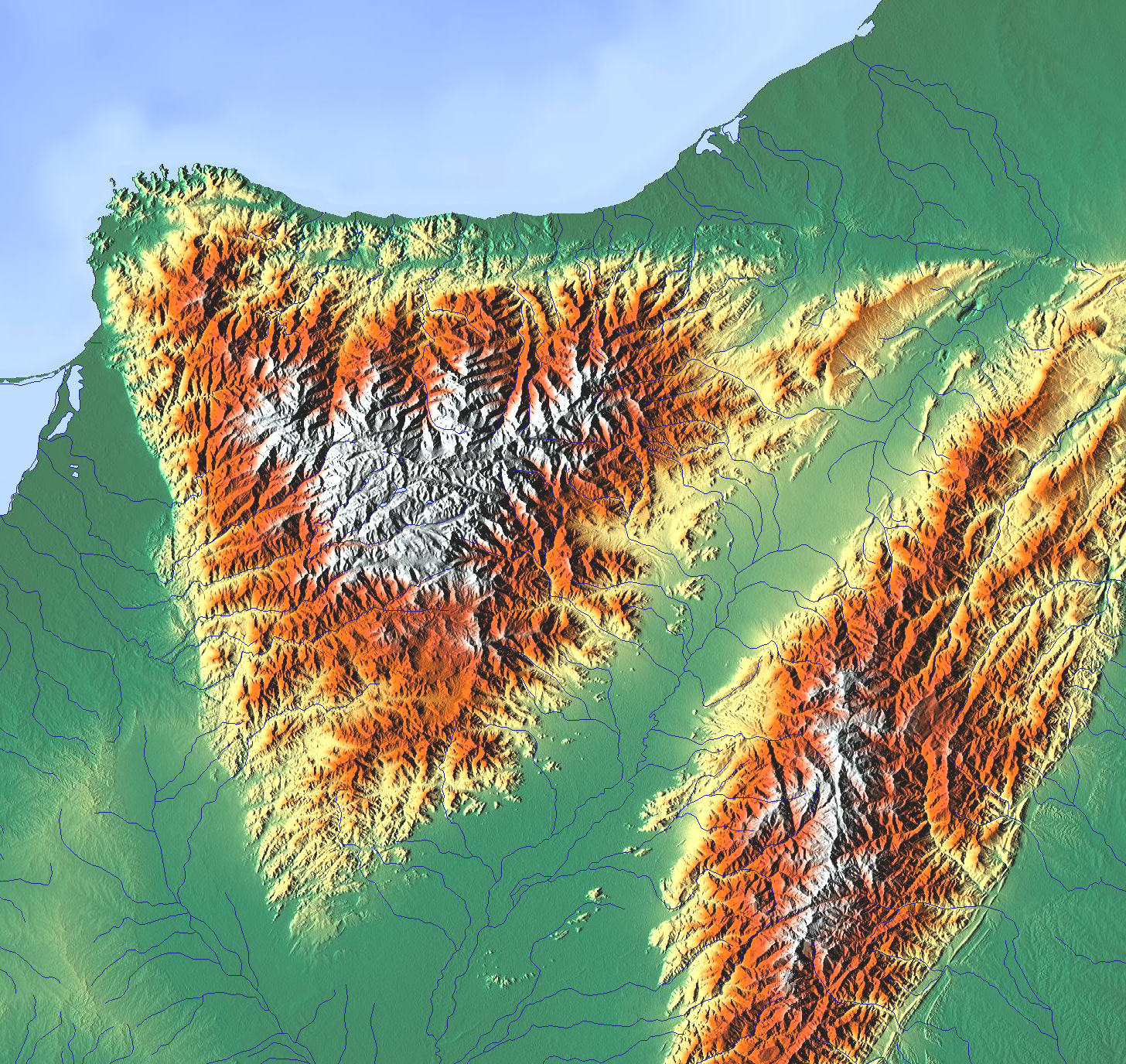
Sierra Nevada de Santa Marta, home of the Kankuamo people

The Kankuamo, Kankuaka, Kankui or Kankuané are an Indigenous people of Colombia, living on the southern slopes of the Sierra Nevada de Santa Marta up until the north of the César department (corregimientos: Atánquez, Guatapurí, Chemesquemena, Los Haticos, La Mina and Rio Seco). The Kankuamo people, estimated at 15,000 individuals, historically spoke Sánha, a dialect of the Atanque language of the Chibchan family. Today, the Kankuamo language is extinct and the people speak only Spanish. Their laws are borne from nature and they consider the Sierra Nevada de Santa Marta, the highest mountain range closest to the sea, as sacred. In their native tongue they call this Umunukunu.

== Indigenous group of the Sierra Nevada de Santa Marta ==
Traditionally, of the four Indigenous groups of the Sierra Nevada de Santa Marta, the Kankuamo people are the least contacted by others, having developed strategies to survive away from the outside world.

The Kankuamo people are characterized for their different way of dressing from the other peoples of the Sierra Nevada; the women wear two overlapping cloths, and the men wear short trousers and a hat of reed. Their living space is bordered by the Kogui, Wiwa and Arhuaco.

From the late 1980s to 2006 over 300 Kankuamo people were murdered during the Colombian conflict.

== Economy ==
The economy of the Kankuamo is based on agriculture. The main products are yuca, ñame, pigeon peas, corn, bananas, coca leaves, fique, arracacha and starch.
