= Sierra Nevada de Santa Marta =

Mountain range in northern Colombia

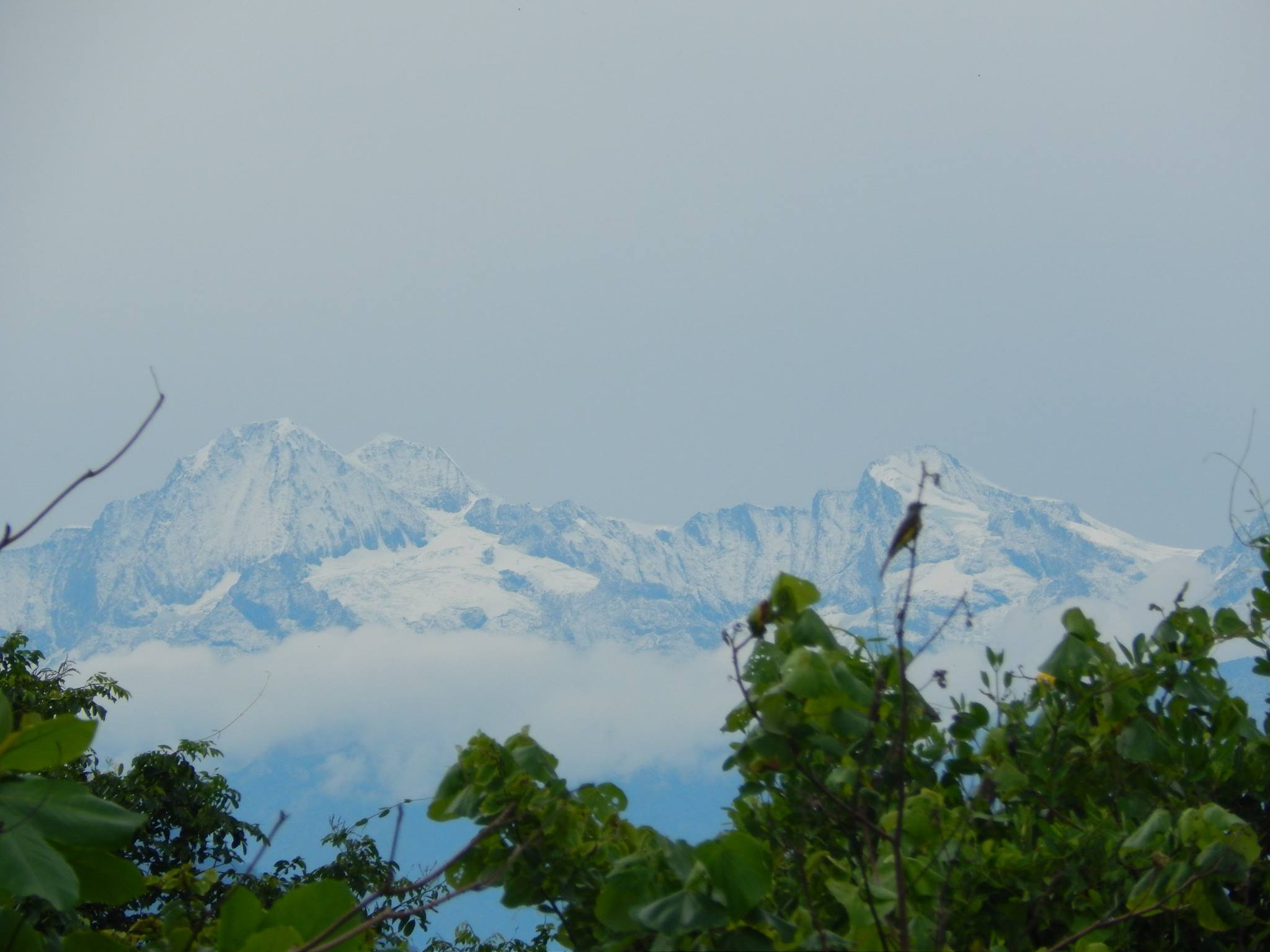

Highest point
- Peak: Pico Simón Bolívar and Pico Cristobal Colon
- Elevation: 5,710 m (18,730 ft)
- Coordinates: 10°52′00″N 73°43′12″W

Dimensions
- Length: 162 km (101 mi)

Geography
- Location within Colombia
- Country: Colombia

PNN Sierra Nevada de Santa Marta
- Sierra Nevada de Santa Marta National Natural Park
- IUCN category II (national park)
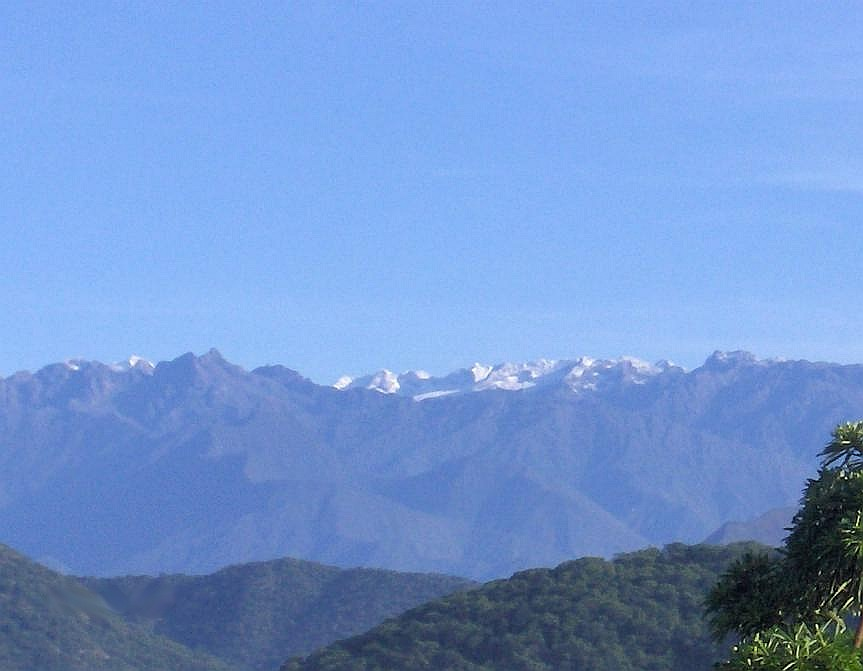
- Sierra Nevada viewed from Valledupar
- Interactive map of PNN Sierra Nevada de Santa Marta
- Nearest city: Santa Marta, Colombia
- Area: 3,830 km^{2} (1,480 sq mi)
- Established: 1964
- Governing body: SINAP

The Sierra Nevada de Santa Marta (English: Snowy Mountain Range of Saint Martha) is an isolated mountain range in northern Colombia, separate from the Andes range that runs through the north of the country. Reaching an elevation of 5,700 m (18,700 ft) just 42 km (26 mi) from the Caribbean coast, the Sierra Nevada is the highest coastal range in the tropics, and one of the highest coastal ranges in the world, being 250 metres (820 ft) shorter than the Saint Elias Mountains in Alaska and Canada. The Sierra Nevada encompasses about 17,000 km^{2} (6,600 sq mi) and serves as the source of 36 rivers. The range is in the Departments of Magdalena, Cesar and La Guajira.

The highest point of the Sierra Nevada group (and Colombia in general) may be either Pico Cristóbal Colón or Pico Simón Bolívar, both in the municipalities of Santa Marta and Aracataca; it has yet to be determined which is higher. SRTM data and local topographic maps show that their true elevations are approximately 5,700 m (18,700 ft), lower than the 5,775 m (18,947 ft) elevation that is often quoted.

The Sierra Nevada is a compact group, relatively small in area, and completely surrounded by lands with elevations below 200 m (660 ft). Although it is associated with the Tropical Andes, the main backbone of the Andes cannot be reached from the Sierra Nevada without dropping below this level. This makes its highest point the world's fifth most prominent summit.

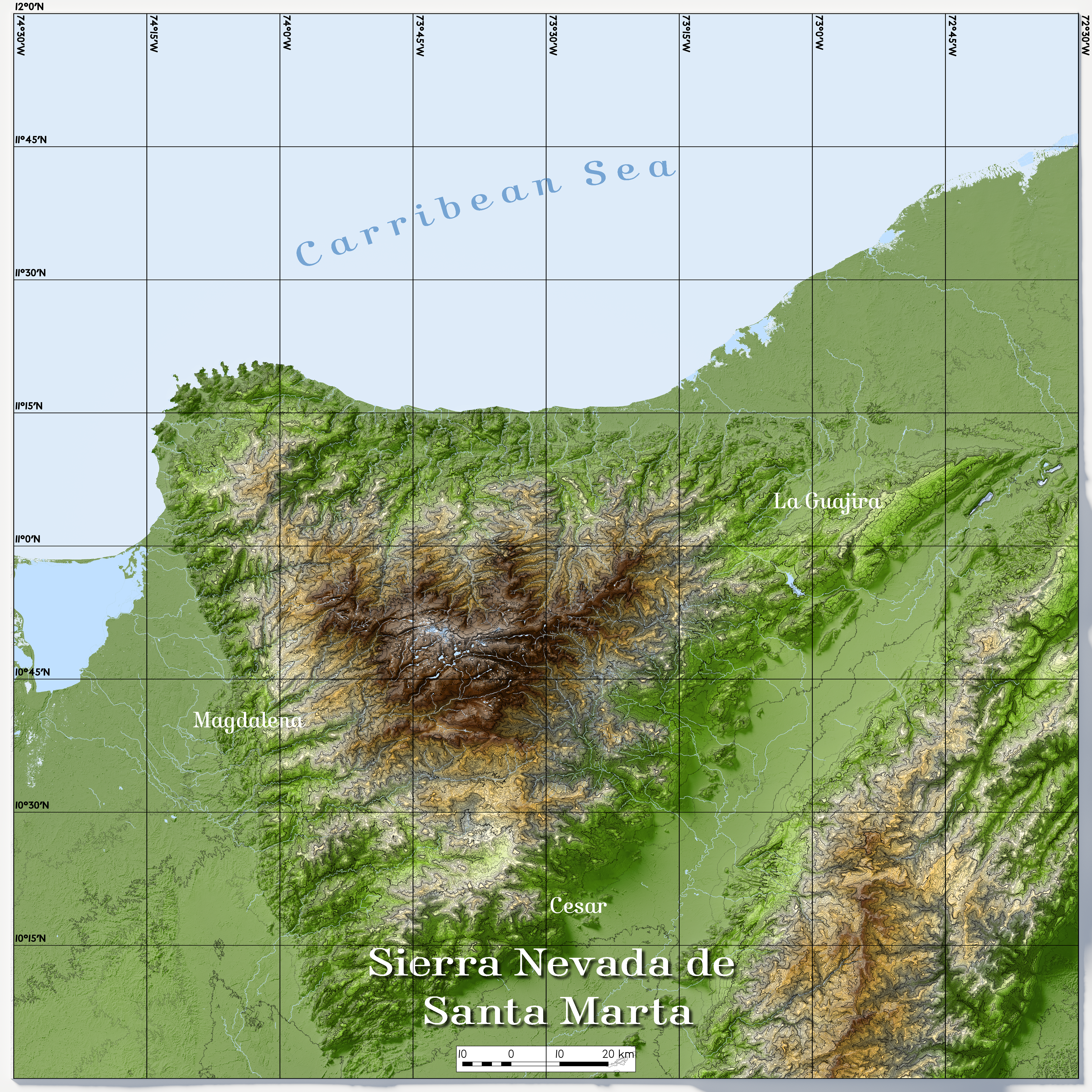
Topographic map of the Sierra Nevada de Santa Marta

Several peaks in the Sierra Nevada are intervisible with Cerro Paramillo, a 3,730 m (12,240 ft) peak in Antioquia Department. This implies a theoretical direct line of sight of just over 500 km (310 mi), reported to be the longest between any two points on the surface of the Earth.

== Climate ==
It is calculated that the yearly average rainfall is 4,000 mm (157.5 in) at elevations of 500 to 1,500 m (1,640 to 4,921 ft). The temperature varies between 0 and 27 °C (32 and 81 °F).

== Biodiversity ==
The tropical rainforest is made up of perennial trees, with a canopy reaching between 30 and 40 m (98 and 131 ft). There is a great variety and large populations of epiphytes and lianas, and more than 3,000 species of vascular plants are found in the area. The indigenous peoples made an alcoholic beverage from fruits of the palm Attalea maripa found at the lower elevations.

Of Colombia's 340 endemic bird species, 44 are found in the park, for example seven species of endemic hummingbirds. Of the 3,057 endangered species, 44 are found here. The area is home to 440 species of birds, including black-fronted wood-quail, king vulture, Andean condor, Santa Marta warbler and Santa Marta parakeet. Mammals found in the park include: tapir, cougar, jaguar, squirrel, Transandinomys talamancae, otter, and brocket deer.

The Sierra Nevada de Santa Marta is home to a number of ecoregions, which vary with elevation.

The Guajira–Barranquilla xeric scrub region lies near the Caribbean seacoast to the north of the range. The Sinú Valley dry forests cover the range's lower slopes, up to an elevation of 500 m (1,640 ft).

The Santa Marta montane forests lie above 500 to 800 m (1,640 to 2,625 ft). The montane forests are separated from other moist forests by the lower-elevation dry forests and xeric shrublands, and have large numbers of endemic species. The montane forest ecoregion has several distinct plant communities, distinguished by altitude and rainfall; moist lowland forests cover the windward northern and western flanks of the range between 500 and 900 m (1,640 and 2,953 ft), and the drier eastern and southern flanks from 1,000 to 5,800 m (3,281 to 19,029 ft). Above 900 m (2,953 ft) is a transitional forest zone of smaller trees and palms. Cloud forests occur above 1,000 m (3,281 ft); the Sub-Andean forests from 1,000 to 2,500 m (3,281 to 8,202 ft) form a canopy 25 to 35 m (82 to 115 ft) tall, while the higher-elevation Andean forests, between 2,500 and 3,300 m (8,202 and 10,827 ft), grow to 15 to 20 m (49 to 66 ft) in height.

The Santa Marta Páramo, a high altitude belt of montane grasslands and shrublands interspersed with marshes and acid bogs, occupies the zone between 3,300 and 5,000 m (10,827 and 16,404 ft). The Santa Marta Páramo is the northernmost enclave of Páramo in South America, which occur along the Andes belt. Above 5,000 m (16,404 ft) lies the permanent snow cap.

== National Natural Park ==
The Sierra Nevada de Santa Marta National Natural Park (Spanish: Parque Nacional Natural Sierra Nevada de Santa Marta) is Colombia's second-oldest national park, established in 1964. It is located in the Cordillera Oriental range, between the departments of La Guajira, Magdalena and Cesar, in the mountain range of the Sierra Nevada de Santa Marta. It is a sanctuary as well as a tourist attraction, because it offers different climate, terrain, flora and fauna environments, ranging from beaches to snowy mountain peaks. Sierra Nevada de Santa Marta National Natural Park is considered a unique place in the world, due to its isolation from the Andes, and its highest peak (5,700 metres (18,701 ft) above sea level) is located just 42 kilometres (26 mi) away from the sea.

All the water courses that originate in the national park drain to the Caribbean sea whether directly (e. g. rivers Ranchería, Don Diego, Palomino, Buritaca, Guachaca, Cañas, etc.) or through the Magdalena River system that includes the Ciénaga Grande de Santa Marta, (e.g. rivers Cesar, Ariguaní, Fundación, Frío, Aracataca, etc.). Roughly 1.2 million people are dependent upon the freshwater supplied by the Sierra Nevada de Santa Marta rivers. There are currently about 30,000 indigenous people of the ethnic groups Koguis, Arhuacos, Kankuamos and Wiwa living in the area. This park is also home to the remnants of the Tairona Culture. In 1979, the park was designated a Biosphere reserve by UNESCO. A 2013 report by the International Union for Conservation of Nature on the world's most irreplaceable protected areas identified the park as the most irreplaceable park in the world for threatened species.

== Geology ==
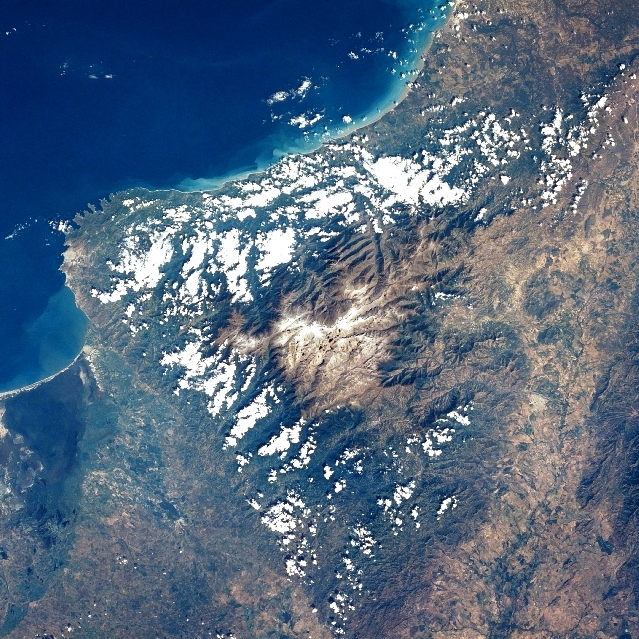
Satellite view of the Sierra Nevada de Santa Marta

It is composed of Cretaceous metamorphic rocks (predominantly schists and gneisses) and quartzdioritic intrusives of Tertiary age. The Quaternary of the Sierra Nevada de Santa Marta is mainly represented by colluvial-alluvial valley fill and by recent beach deposits. The coastlines of the northwestern part of the Sierra Nevada de Santa Marta are indented, reflecting the alternation of rocky headlands and deep, north-northwest trending tectonically controlled bays. The headlands are typically 100-to-150 m (330-to-490 ft) cliffs cut into schists and granites, whereas the embayments front alluvial valley deposits. The bay shores are typically steep, reflective beaches composed of very coarse sand to granules eroded from adjacent cliffs and alluvial deposits. Wide pocket beaches and tombolos are common along sectors with abundant rocky erosional remnants and stacks.

== Fauna ==
Three species of reptiles which are native to the Sierra Nevada de Santa Marta are named after it: Anolis santamartae, a lizard; Atractus sanctaemartae, a snake; and Lepidoblepharis sanctaemartae, a lizard.

The range is home to about 20 endemic bird species.

== Inhabitants ==
The Sierra Nevada de Santa Marta is home to the remnants of the Native American Tairona Culture; Arhuacos, Koguis, Wiwas and Kankuamos, that live in Resguardos Indigenas (indigenous reserves) located in the mid-highlands.

=== Recent access problems ===
For the last ten years, access to the highest summits has been very difficult, and this situation continues, although there is a documented ascent of Pico Cristóbal Colón in December 2015. This was due to opposition from locals in the southern side of the mountain to aid and allow climbers to explore the place. Their aid and permission is important for success in the summit. Armed turmoil has also proven to hinder access to the place, notwithstanding the peace process carried on since 2016. The only safe and relatively straightforward access is from Santa Marta city to Cuchillo de San Lorenzo, but that is only to 2,800 m (9,200 ft) (although it provides excellent views of the peaks).

== See also ==
- Ciudad Perdida
- Tayrona
- Juan Mayr
- Pico Cristobal Colon
- Pico Simon Bolivar
