= Freddy Molina =

Colombian musician and songwriter

- Born: Freddy de Jesús Molina Daza; 4 August 1945; Patillal, Colombia
- Died: 14 October 1972 (aged 27) Patillal, Colombia
- Genre: Vallenato
- Years active: 1966–1972

Freddy de Jesús Molina Daza (Note: Also spelled Fredy. In this Spanish name, the first or paternal surname is Molina and the second or maternal family name is Daza.) (1945–1972) was a Colombian musician and songwriter. He wrote several vallenato songs that were recorded by artists including Alfredo Gutiérrez and Carlos Vives, and won the unpublished song competition of the Vallenato Legend Festival in 1970.

== Biography ==
=== Early life and education ===
Freddy de Jesús Molina Daza was born on 8 August 1945 in Patillal, in the Colombian department of Cesar (but at that time in Magdalena), to Eloísa Daza Hinojosa and José Amiro Molina Gutiérrez. Molina went to school in Valledupar. He didn't graduate high school, but moved to Bogotá to study music composition at the Luis A. Calvo Academy.

=== Music career ===
Molina's compositions appeared on a record for the first time in 1966, when his songs "Los Novios" and "Indiferente" were included in a compilation album put out by Discos Orbe. His songwriting style was influenced by the Colombian artistic movement of nadaism, which he was introduced to by Marta Traba and Gonzalo Arango when they attended the Vallenato Legend Festival in 1969.

In 1969 Molina was introduced to Alfredo Gutiérrez, who went on to record several of his compositions, including "Adiós Noviazgo", "Dos Rosas", "La Verdad", "Recuerdos de Ella", and "Amor Sensible". Molina's songs have also been recorded by Jorge Oñate with Los Hermanos López, Héctor Lavoe, Los Melódicos, Roberto Torres, Peter Manjarrés, Diana Burco, and Carlos Vives.

Molina won the unpublished song competition of the Vallenato Legend Festival in 1970 with the paseo "El Indio Desventurado", which was later recorded by Alfredo Gutiérrez and Diomedes Díaz. In 1973, Armando Zabaleta won the competition with the song "No Voy a Patillal", which he wrote about Molina's death.

=== Death ===
Molina died on 14 August 1972 in Patillal, after being shot in the house of his brother Aldo José.
