= Arhuaca mochila =

Colombian artisan bag

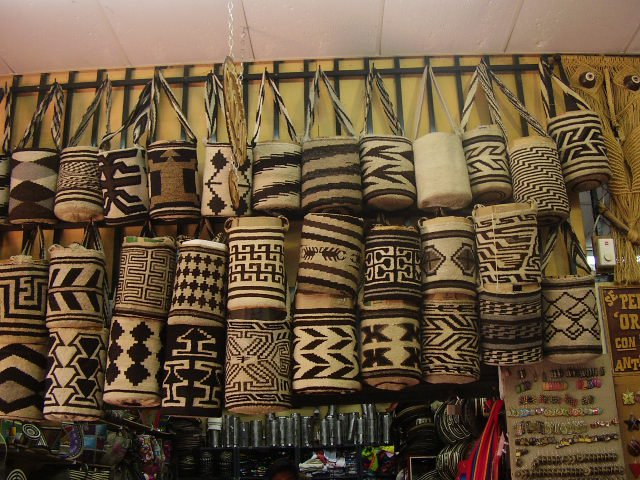
The Arhuaca mochila is a popular artisan bag in Colombia.

The mochila arhuaca (English: Arhuaca knapsack), or tutu iku in Ika, is a popular Colombian artisan bag made by the Arhuaco people of the Sierra Nevada. In recent years, they have become a cultural symbol of Colombian identity.

== History ==
Although the whole arhuaco community is involved in production, only Wati (Arhuaco women) can weave the bags together according to custom. Traditionally, the women learn to weave from an early age by watching their mothers. The first mochila they make is given to the priest for the rituals of the life cycle.

== Characteristics ==
The colors with which the mochilas are woven are earth tones, ranging from brown and beige to black and gray. Originally they were woven with natural fibers from the Arahuaco lands, such as agave and cotton (the latter reserved for Mamos backpacks, which can not be traded). The Spanish introduced sheep's wool and currently mochilas also are made with industrial fibers.

The bags are usually decorated with indigenous representations of animals and other objects of their cosmology. Each design identifies a family. Some of the most important are the gamako (frog), the symbol of fertility, the zikamu (centipede), the aku (rattlesnake), which symbolizes time and space, the peynu (comb), the kutia (ribs), kaku serankua (the creator of the Sierra father), makuru (vulture), gwirkunu (hills and lakes), urumu (snail), sariwuwu (the months of pregnancy), kunsamunu a'mia (the thought of women), kunsamunu cheyrua (human thought), kanzachu (tree leaf), chinuzatu (the four corners of the world), kambiru (scorpion tail or scribble), phundwas (the snowy peaks of the Sierra) and Garwa (the father of the roads).

In the town of Atanquez, the bags are most frequently made with hemp from the Sierra Nevada de Santa Marta mountain range.

== Usage ==
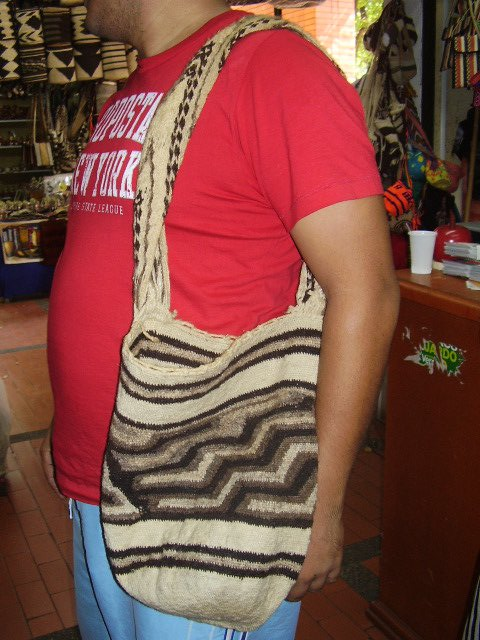
Arhuaca mochila

Arhuaco men traditionally use three bags: one called chige kwanu, to save personal belongings, another called Zizhu, to carry coca leaves, and the third for food storage or travel items. They also used a fourth one called masi, to hold their poporo. The women carry the tutu gawa made of agave. The tutu chakeai and jina kau (white, cotton, without drawings) are marunsama backpacks or mamu (spiritual sage of the arhuaco).

When a man and woman will marry, the future wife weaves two bags, one for her and one for her husband, to symbolize the love of the couple.

== Popular culture ==
Starting in the 1960s, the arhuaca mochila left the geographical arhuaco, penetrated large Colombian cities (especially Santa Marta and Valledupar), and is used primarily by young people today as a way to claim their indigenous culture.

In 2006, the backpack was nominated as the Arhuaco cultural symbol of Colombia in the contest organized by the magazine Semana.

Disney's 2021 film Encanto features the protagonist Mirabel Madrigal carrying a mochila bag when traveling.

== See also ==
- Ruana
- Sombrero vueltiao
