= Los Haticos =

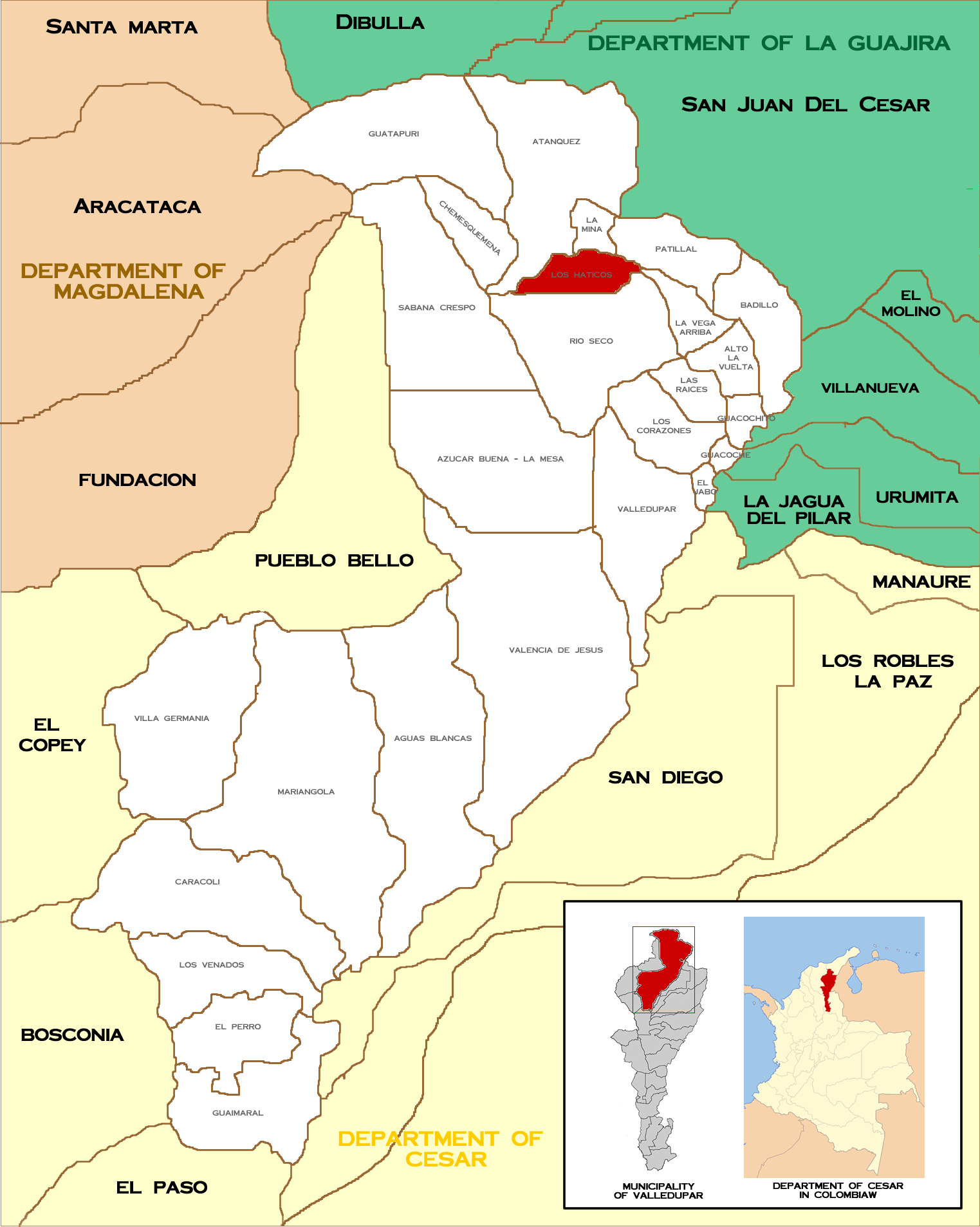
- Location in the municipality of Valledupar.
- Country: Colombia
- Department: Cesar
- Municipality: Valledupar

Government
  - Type: Corregimiento
- Time zone: UTC-5

Los Haticos is a populated center of Colombia and corregimiento in the municipality of Valledupar within the Colombian Department of Cesar. The town lies on the steps of the Sierra Nevada de Santa Marta in the Colombian Caribbean region.

== Geography ==
The corregimiento of Los Haticos borders to the north with the corregimientos of La Mina and Atanquez, to the south with the corregimiento of Rio Seco and to the northeast with the corregimiento of Patillal.

== History ==
The Corregimiento of Los Haticos was created on August 18, 1980, by Municipal Accord 007 of that same year.

== Veredas ==
- Haticos Chindo
- Haticos López
- Haticos Pastrana
- Sevilla
