= San Juan del Cesar =

Coordinates: 10°46′N 73°00′W

- Municipality and town
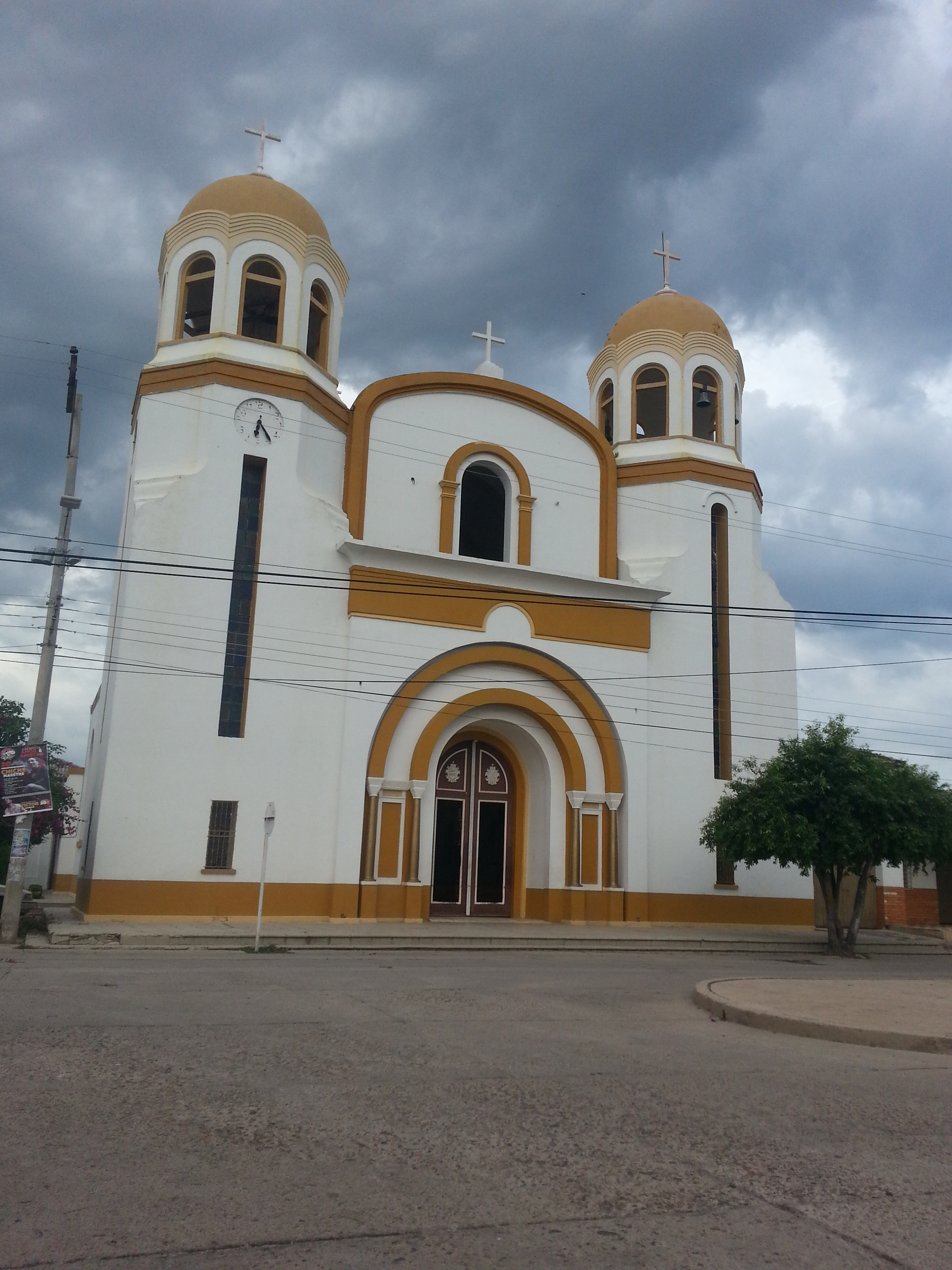

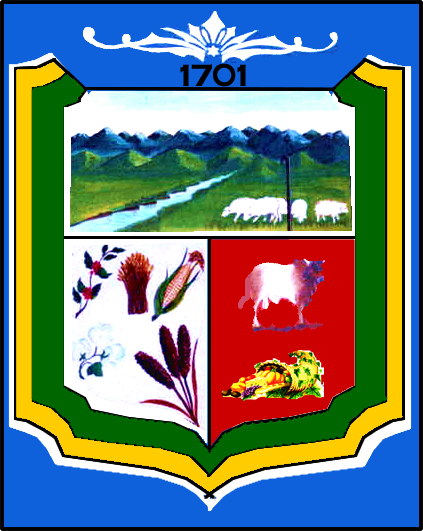
- Flag Coat of arms

- Location of the municipality and town of San Juan del Cesar in La Guajira Department.
- Country: Colombia
- Region: Caribbean
- Department: La Guajira
- Foundation: June 24, 1701 by Captain Salvador Felix Arias Pereira

Government
  - Mayor: Cubita Enrique Camilo Urbina Suarez (U-CR)

Area
  - Municipality and town: 1,314 km^{2} (507 sq mi)
  - Urban: 6.84 km^{2} (2.64 sq mi)
- Elevation: 250 m (820 ft)

Population (2020 est.)
  - Municipality and town: 49,584
  - Density: 37.74/km^{2} (97.73/sq mi)
  - Urban: 35,079
  - Urban density: 5,130/km^{2} (13,300/sq mi)
- Time zone: UTC-5
- Climate: Aw

San Juan del Cesar is a municipality and town located in the La Guajira Department, Colombia.

== Etymology ==
San Juan Bautista del Cesar name in English: John the Baptist and Chet-tzar or Sasare indigenous language for calm water, the name of the Cesar River.

== History ==
The region San Juan del Cesar was inhabited by Arhuacos indigenous tribe, led during that time by a Cacique named "Marocazo". It was founded on June 24, 1701 by Captain Salvador Felix Arias Pereira with the name of Villa of San Juan Bautista, over Mount Yiyirigak by the Cesar River. Arias-Pereira was in a mission to "pacify" the indigenous tribes in rebellion; the Tupes, Coyaimas, Conopans and Marocazos.

The Villa of San Juan immediately became a pass for people traveling between Valledupar and the port of Riohacha, back then an important commercial route flowing with cattle and agricultural products. The first church was built by Priest Gonzalo Suárez Oñate.

== Geography ==
The municipality of San Juan del Cesar is located between the mountain ranges of the Sierra Nevada de Santa Marta and the Serranía del Perijá by the Cesar River and close to the Ranchería River. It borders to the north with the municipality of Riohacha and Distracción, to the south with the municipalities of Villanueva, El Molino and the Cesar Department. To the east with the Bolivarian Republic of Venezuela, to the west again with the municipality of Riohacha, Dibulla and Cesar Department covering a total area of 1,415 km^{2}. The urban area of San Juan del Cesar covers 10% of this area; 141 km^{2} and the rural area 90%; 1,274 km^{2}.

The municipality is part of the Upper Valley of the Cesar River (Spanish: Alto Valle del Río César), where the Cañaverales tributary is located.

=== Climate ===
The average temperature is 27°C year round.

== Economy ==
San Juan del Cesar together with Riohacha and Dibulla, are one of the production zones in which the yam, also known as Ñame, is cultivated in the department. San Juan del Cesar is one of the largest producers of yam in the Colombian Caribbean region in which 85 hectares of yam production has been reported.

== Administrative divisions ==
=== Neighborhoods ===
The municipality seat of San Juan del Cesar had in 2003 some 35 neighborhoods; Villa Corelca, Gran Colombia, Manzanares, El Centro, La Floresta, San Rafael, Regional, La Victoria, Juan Bautista Forero, Loma Fresca, Manzanillo, Paraíso de Betel, La Esperanza, 16 de Julio, Norte Félix Arias, 20 de Julio, Buenos Aires, El Prado, Las Delicias, Alpes, Enrique Brito, El Carmen, San Francisco, Juan Antonio Araujo, Rafael de Armas, Las Tunas I y II, Chiquinquirá, Villa Hermosa, Manuel Antonio Dávila, San Juan Bautista, Chapinero, Los Ángeles and Los Olivos.

=== Corregimientos ===
- Cañaverales
- Caracolí
- Corral de Piedras
- El Totumo
- Guayacanal
- La Junta
- La Peña
- Los Haticos
- Los Pondores
- Villa del río

=== Centros Poblados ===
- Boca del Monte
- Corralejas
- Curazao
- El Hatico de los Indios
- El Tablazo
- La Peña de los Indios
- Lagunita
- Los Cardones
- El Placer
- Los Pozos
- La Sierrita
- Pondorito
- Potrerito
- Zambrano

=== Veredas ===
- Boca del Monte
- Copo de Nieve
- Curazao
- El Caney
- El Capuchino
- El Carmen
- El Limón
- El Machín
- El Pital
- El Placer
- El Playón
- El Voladorcito
- Farias
- La Loma del Potrero
- Los Tamacos
- Los Tunales
- Piloncito
- Sabana Grande
- Sabanas de Joaquina
- San Benito
- Tocapalma
- Torcuatopinto
- Ulago

== Heritage sites ==
In 2021, the municipality of San Juan del Cesar was selected by the National Tourism Fund (FONTUR) among the 25 municipalities of the "Pueblos que Enamoran" initiative, due to its historical sites and tourist attractions, in particular, La Ruta del Cacique (lit. 'The Cacique's Route').

=== Churches ===
In 1973, the community of the municipality decided to raise funds for the construction of a new modern church. The old church was demolished, in the meantime the parish priest Manuel Antonio Dávila ordered to build a small chapel near the cemetery of the municipality, in order to preserve the images of the old church and perform masses there while the new church was being built. The construction of this temple, which today is called the San Juan Bautista Parish, was carried out by the architect from Barranquilla, Carlos Makis Ordóñez, and lasted between 1944 and 1945.

The parishes of San Juan Bautista, El Divino Niño and Nuestra Señora del Carmen located in the town of San Juan del Cesar are supported by the municipal administration for religious events. Also the municipality has several churches categorized as assets of cultural interest by the Ministry of Culture, such as the Lagunita church, which was designated as a material heritage site in July 2003, where eucharistic celebrations are held in honor of the patron saint, San Rafael Arcángel. Another parish that has been considered a cultural property of cultural interest since 2003 is the San Francisco de Asis Church in the corregimiento of Pondores, south of the municipal capital.

=== Museums ===
The municipality has the Manuel Antonio Dávila House of Culture, which is attached to the office of Social Management and the Secretariat of Government and Education, which was declared a national heritage site in July 2003 along with the churches of the corregimientos of the municipality. In this cultural events have been held such as events of historical photographs of the municipality. The municipality also contains other heritage sites such as the Ventana Marroncita (lit. 'The Brown Window') which is part of the Cacique route, this place inspired Diomedes Diaz's album "Tres Canciones", this museum located in Corregimiento La Junta, contains clothing and photos of Diomedes. The Corregimiento de La Junta, also has a gallery of Diomedez's eldest daughter, Rosa Elvira Diaz Mejia with personal belongings.
