= Jonathan De Guzman =

Jonathan De Guzman may refer to the following persons:

- Jonathan de Guzmán (1987–), association football player
- Jonathan De Guzman (police officer) (1973–2016), American police officer

== See also ==
- Guzmán (disambiguation)
