= El Molino, La Guajira =

Coordinates: 10.6533°N 72.9242°W

El Molino
- town
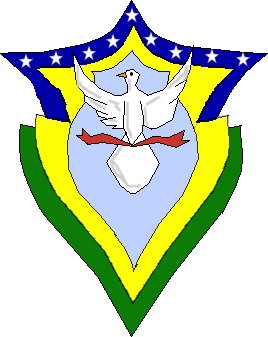
- Flag Coat of arms

- Location of the town and municipality of El Molino in the Department of La Guajira.
- Country: Colombia
- Region: Caribbean
- Department: La Guajira
- Foundation: 1595

Government
  - Mayor: Luis Alfredo Escobar Rodriguez (Movimiento Apertura Liberal)

Area
  - town: 190 km^{2} (73 sq mi)
  - Urban: 1.5 km^{2} (0.58 sq mi)
- Elevation: 240 m (790 ft)

Population (2005)
  - town: 5,937
- Time zone: UTC-5
- Climate: Aw
- Website: elmolino-laguajira.gov.co/

El Molino (English: The Mill) is a town and municipality located in the Colombian Department of La Guajira.

The town is known for having the colonial church Ermita de San Lucas, considered a National Monument of Colombia. The town also celebrates the Festival del Cantante (Spanish for Festival of the Singer). It became a municipality in 1989.

== Geography ==
The municipality is within the Valley formed by the Sierra Nevada de Santa Marta and Serranía del Perijá mountains and the Cesar River. The municipality is located on the mountain steps of the Serranía del Perijá covering a total area of 190 km^{2} and at 240 meters over sea level.

The municipality of El Molino is located in the southern part of the Department of La Guajira limiting to the west and north with the municipality of San Juan del Cesar; to the south with the municipality of Villanueva and to east with the Bolivarian Republic of Venezuela.

The El Molino River is the main source of water for the municipality, flowing down from the Serrania del Perija mountain range and into the Cesar River.

=== Climate ===
The average temperature throughout the year is 28 °C with two rainy season and two dry seasons. Climate varies depending on altitude from steppe to mountainous, ranging between 16 °C and 34 °C presenting warm, temperate and cold weather.

== History ==
The village of El Molino was founded in 1595 as Villa del Rosario by the Spanish colonizer Pedro Beltrán Valdés and became part of the Government of Santa Marta. The name was changed later to "Población de San Lucas de El Molino" and Later to simply El Molino.

The first inhabitants in the region, prior to the Spanish colonization of the Americas were indigenous peoples pertaining to the Cariachiles ethnic group. Capichin friars named the village "Población de San Lucas de El Molino" because of a Wheat Mill (grinding) which was later demolished. Besides Spanish families, El Molino also received colonizers from Portugal, France and Germany to a lesser scale.

El Molino became a corregimiento of the municipality of Villanueva and subsequently became a municipality in 1989. El Molino was officially formed by Ordinance 039 of 2001 segregated from the municipality of San Juan del Cesar after a popular referendum.

== Notable people ==
- Álvaro Montero, professional footballer
- Fabri Meriño (1952–1971), vallenato accordionist
- Armando Zabaleta (1927–2010), vallenato musician and songwriter
