= Guzmán (disambiguation) =

Guzmán is a Spanish surname.

Guzmán may also refer to:

== People with Guzmán as a given name ==
- Guzmán Casaseca, Spanish soccer player, known as simply Guzmán
- Guzmán Quintero Torres, Colombian journalist

== Geographical features ==
=== Americas ===
- Ciudad Guzmán, Jalisco, Mexico
- Guzmán Basin, northern Mexico and the southern United States
- Puerto Guzmán, Putumayo, Colombia
- Santo Domingo de Guzmán (usually simply Santo Domingo), Dominican Republic
- Guzmán, Coclé, Panama

=== Spain ===
- Guzmán, Burgos, Spain
- Castilleja de Guzmán, Seville, Spain
- Toral de los Guzmanes, León, Spain

== Other ==
- Castillo de Guzmán, a castle in Tarifa, Spain
- Guzmán de Alfarache, Spanish novel by Mateo Alemán
- Roman Catholic Diocese of Ciudad Guzmán, Jalisco, Mexico
- Estadio Mario Mercado Vaca Guzmán, a stadium in Potosí, Bolivia
- Gobernador Horacio Guzmán International Airport, an airport serving San Salvador de Jujuy, Argentina
- National University of Education Enrique Guzmán y Valle, a Peruvian university
- Prix Guzman, prize for interplanetary communication
- Sinaloa Cartel, a drug cartel sometimes called the Guzman-Loera Organization
