= Armando Zabaleta =

Colombian songwriter, singer, and musician

- Born: Armando Darío Zabaleta Guevara; 21 February 1927; El Molino, Colombia
- Died: 8 June 2010 (aged 83) Barranquilla, Colombia
- Genres: Vallenato
- Spouse: Adelma María Meza

Armando Darío Zabaleta Guevara (Note: In this Spanish name, the first or paternal surname is Zabaleta and the second or maternal family name is Guevara.) (1927–2010) was a Colombian songwriter, singer, and guacharaca player. His best known composition is "No Voy a Patillal", which he wrote about the death of Freddy Molina.

== Biography ==
Armando Darío Zabaleta Guevara was born on 21 February 1927 in El Molino, in the Colombian department of La Guajira, to Fernando Antonio Zabaleta and Francisca Guevara. He was a vallenato singer and guacharaca player, and he performed with accordionists including Luis Enrique Martínez and Colacho Mendoza. Zabaleta was also a songwriter, and his best known song is "No Voy a Patillal".

Zabaleta was married to Adelma María Meza, with whom he had five children. He had Parkinson's in later life, and died on 8 June 2010 in Barranquilla.

== Notable compositions ==
Zabaleta wrote several songs in the genre of vallenato, and his best known is "No Voy a Patillal", which he wrote about the death of Freddy Molina, and which won the unpublished song competition of the Vallenato Legend Festival in 1973. He wrote the song "Aracataca Te Espera" as a criticism of Gabriel García Márquez following his Nobel Prize win, and the song was recorded by Jorge Oñate with Los Hermanos López in 1974.

At one point Zabaleta attempted to revive the long-term piqueria rivalry between Emiliano Zuleta and Lorenzo Morales by writing the merengue "La Sugestión de Zuleta", which mocked Zuleta, who believed it to have been written by Morales. Morales wrote the song "La Bulla" to defuse the situation.

Other notable compositions by Zabaleta include "Margarita" (later recorded by Diomedes Díaz and Colacho Mendoza), "Amor Comprado", "Aborréceme", "El Villanuevero", "La Garra", "Lo Mismo Me Da", "El Trajecito Gris", "La Guacamaya Verde", 'Déjame Quieto", "Recuerdos de Emilianito", and "No Me Guardes Luto".
