= Valledupar =

- Municipality and City
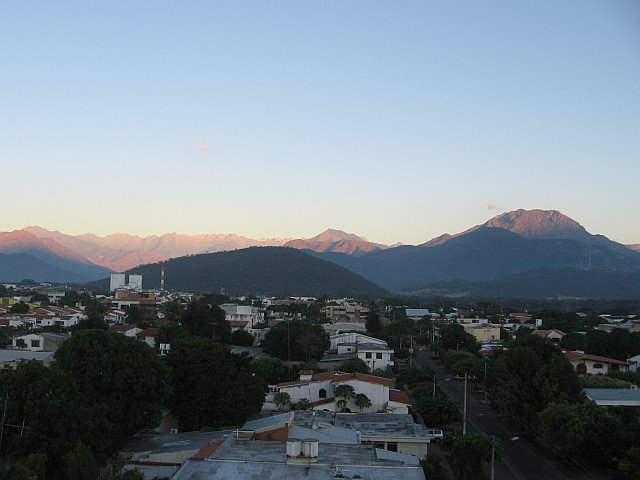
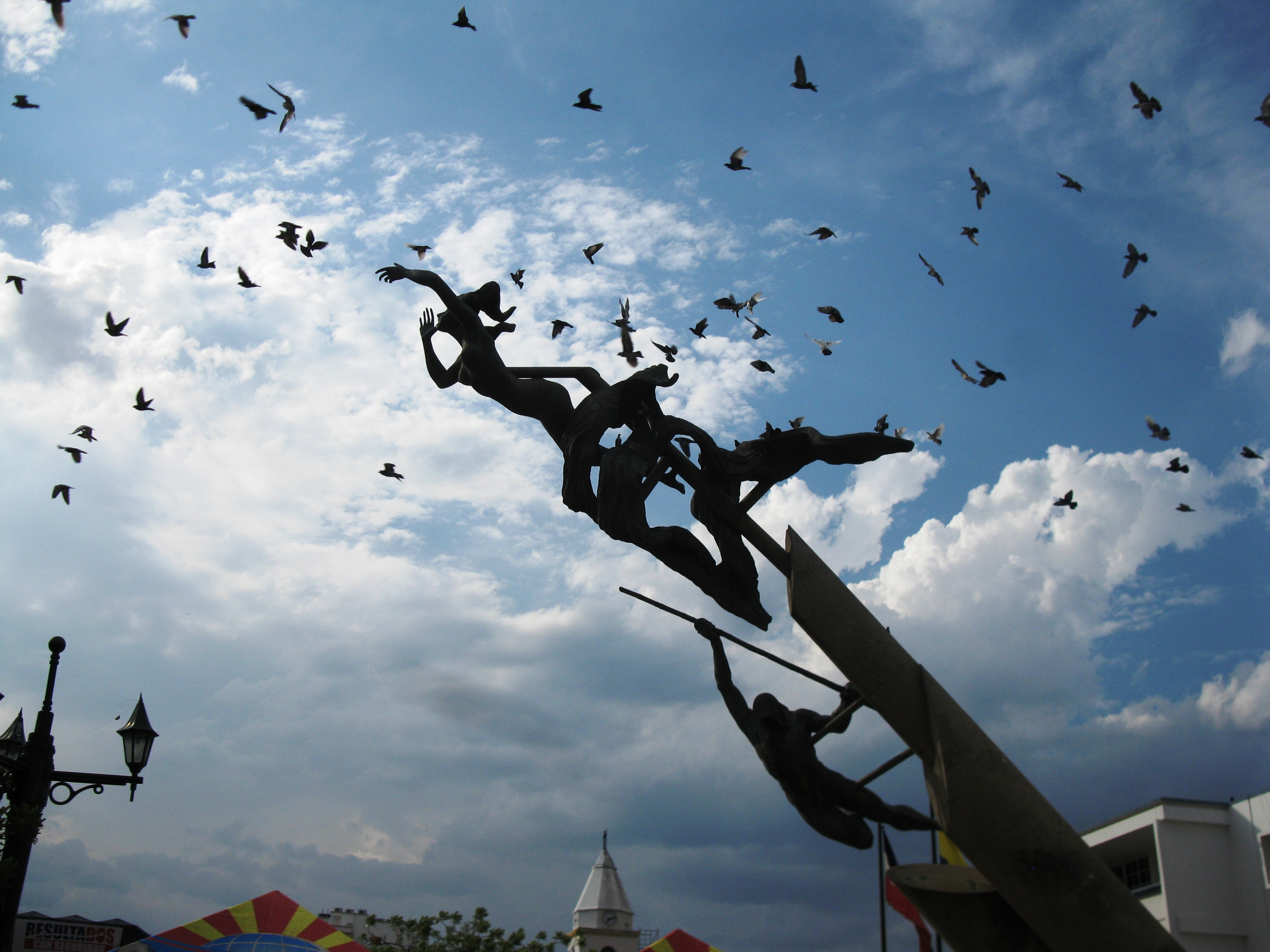
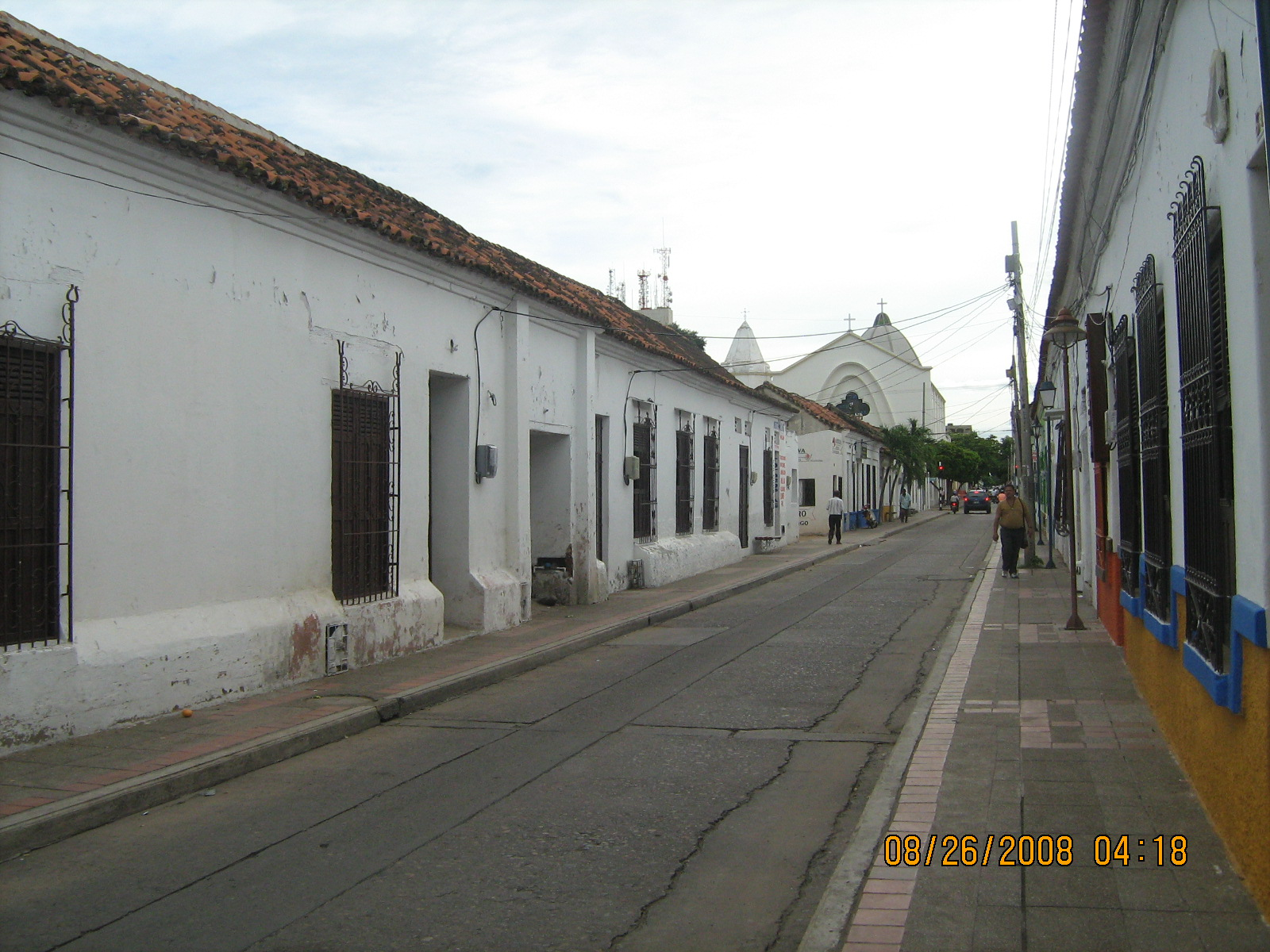
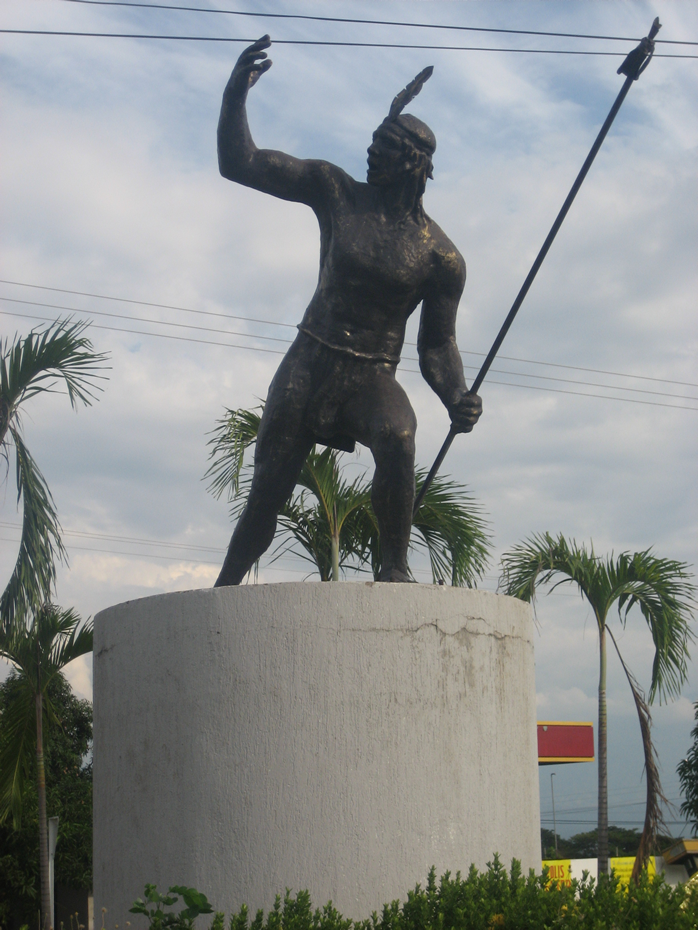
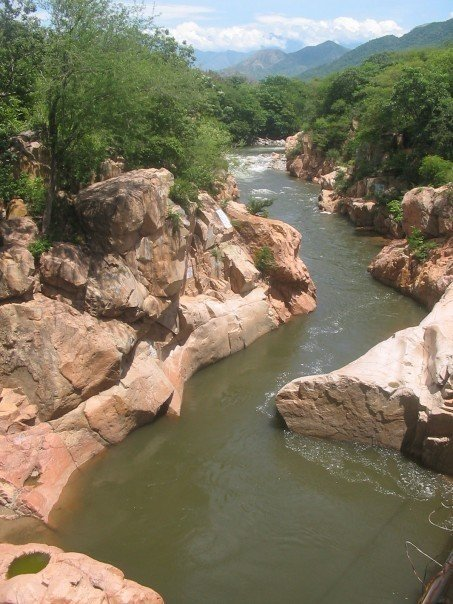
- From above and from left to right: Aerial panoramic view, Monument to the Revolution in March, Calle 15 in the Historic Center, Statue of Cacique Upar and the Guatapuri River

- Flag Coat of arms
- Nickname: Ciudad de los Santos Reyes de Valledupar (City of the Holy Kings of Valledupar)
- Location in the Department of Cesar. Municipality (dark gray), City (red).

- Location within Colombia
- Coordinates: 10°29′N 73°15′W
- Country: Colombia
- Region: Caribbean
- Department: Cesar
- Foundation: January 6, 1550

Government
  - Mayor: Ernesto Miguel Orozco Durán (2024–2028) (Colombian Conservative Party)

Area
  - Municipality: 4,977.66 km^{2} (1,921.89 sq mi)
  - Urban: 47.53 km^{2} (18.35 sq mi)
- Elevation: 168 m (551 ft)

Population (2020)
  - Municipality: 526,238
  - Estimate (2026): 629,217
  - Rank: 14th in Colombia
  - Density: 105.720/km^{2} (273.813/sq mi)
  - Urban: 553,000
  - Urban density: 11,600/km^{2} (30,100/sq mi)
  - Metro: 803,000
  - Seat/Locality: 490,300
- Demonym: Vallenato
- Time zone: UTC-05 (Eastern Time Zone)
- Postal code: 200001-200005
- Area code: 57 + 5
- Climate: Aw
- Website: Official website (in Spanish)

Valledupar (Spanish pronunciation: [baʝeðuˈpaɾ]) is a city and municipality in northeastern Colombia. It is the capital of Cesar Department. Its name, Valle de Upar (Valley of Upar), was established in honor of the Amerindian cacique who ruled the valley; Cacique Upar. The city lies between the mountains of the Sierra Nevada de Santa Marta and the Serranía del Perijá to the borders of the Guatapurí and Cesar rivers.

Valledupar is an important agricultural, cattle raising, coal mining and agro-industrial center for the region between the Departments of Cesar and southern municipalities of La Guajira Department, formerly known as the Padilla Province. Valledupar is notable as the cradle of vallenato music, representative of the Colombian culture. The city hosts the Vallenato Legend Festival.

During the 1980s, 1990s and early 2000s, the city suffered during the Colombian conflict, with numerous kidnappings, thousands of people forced out and failure to control crime.

Valledupar has one of Colombia's most modern maximum security prisons.

== Geography ==
Valledupar is located southeast of the Sierra Nevada de Santa Marta. Its average temperature is 28 °C. Because of its relatively high altitude and proximity to the equator, it has a variety of environments, from warm heat to perpetual snow. Notable geographic features in Valledupar include the Sierra Nevada de Santa Marta's peaks; the Codazzi, El Guardian, the Ojeda and La Reina. Many rivers descend from its snowy peaks and lagoons; the Ariguani, Ariguanicito, Badillo, Calderas, Cesar, Curiba, Donachui, Garupal, Guatapuri, which borders the city of Valledupar; and the Mariangola.

The Municipality of Valledupar is bordered on the north with the municipalities of Riohacha and San Juan del Cesar in La Guajira Department. To the south are the municipalities of El Paso and Los Robles La Paz in Cesar Department; to the east are the municipalities of Villanueva and Urumita, also in La Guajira Department; and to the west are the municipalities Fundacion and Aracataca, in Magdalena Department.

The municipality has an area of about 4,977.96 km^{2}, from which 72,660 km^{2} pertain to the Arhuacos Indian Reserve, 399.52 km^{2} to the Kogui and Wiwa Indian Reserve, and 425.60 km^{2} to the Sierra Nevada de Santa Marta National Park.

=== Fauna and flora ===
The municipality is home to numerous endemic species, mostly living in the ecosystem of the Sierra Nevada de Santa Marta and Serrania del Perijá mountains, one of the most biodiverse places in the world. The most recently discovered species of bees was found in rural areas of Valledupar and named Stelis vallenata in tribute to the local Vallenato music.

The city's symbolic bird is the Turpial. Other notable birds that inhabit the region are the parrots that flock the fruit trees year round.

During the colonial period, Spaniards introduced invasive European fauna into the region, such as dogs, cats, rats, mice, cattle, horses, mules, goats and gallineta africana, doves, among others. Spaniards also introduced numerous species of flora from all over the world into the region, most notably mango trees, which have become the most popular tree in the city and municipality. However, the symbolic trees of the city are two types of Yellow Tabebuia, colloquially called "Cañaguate" and Puy. These trees cover the region with their notorious yellow blossom flowers during the dry season.

The entities in charge of protecting and controlling the fauna and flora in the region are the Colombian Ministry of Environment, the local decentralized agency Corpocesar, under the Governor of the Cesar Department and Environmental Police of the Colombian National Police. Other non-profit organizations collaborate with these entities.

=== Climate ===
Climate in the municipality of Valledupar is determined by altitude. Half of the region is mountainous and the rest is plains in between the mountain ranges of the Sierra Nevada de Santa Marta and the Serrania del Perijá. Throughout the year, the region has two dry seasons and two rainy seasons affected by El Niño and La Niña phenomena. The peaks of the mountainous region gets snow during the rainy season and much cooler days and depending on the weather, the entire region gets hit lightly by hailstorms and thunderstorms. The region is slightly affected by the annual Caribbean hurricane season. The levels of rivers and bodies of water increase in the rainy season, and vegetation grows green and bushy. During the dry season, vegetation dries and turns mostly yellow, while bodies of water decrease in volume.

In 2013, Valledupar was classified on average as the hottest place in Colombia, according to the Colombian Meteorological Institute, IDEAM.

Climate data for Valledupar, Guaymaral 50 m (1981–2010)
Month	Jan	Feb	Mar	Apr	May	Jun	Jul	Aug	Sep	Oct	Nov	Dec	Year
Record high °C (°F)	39.5 (103.1)	39.8 (103.6)	42.0 (107.6)	39.8 (103.6)	39.4 (102.9)	40.8 (105.4)	46.0 (114.8)	40.2 (104.4)	39.0 (102.2)	38.2 (100.8)	38.0 (100.4)	39.8 (103.6)	46.0 (114.8)
Mean daily maximum °C (°F)	36.4 (97.5)	36.5 (97.7)	36.6 (97.9)	36.5 (97.7)	35.5 (95.9)	35.4 (95.7)	35.7 (96.3)	35.5 (95.9)	34.6 (94.3)	33.8 (92.8)	34.1 (93.4)	35.1 (95.2)	35.3 (95.5)
Daily mean °C (°F)	30.4 (86.7)	30.5 (86.9)	30.3 (86.5)	30.2 (86.4)	29.7 (85.5)	29.8 (85.6)	29.9 (85.8)	29.8 (85.6)	29.3 (84.7)	28.8 (83.8)	29.0 (84.2)	29.7 (85.5)	29.8 (85.6)
Mean daily minimum °C (°F)	23.8 (74.8)	24.3 (75.7)	24.3 (75.7)	24.2 (75.6)	24.2 (75.6)	24.2 (75.6)	24.2 (75.6)	24.0 (75.2)	23.7 (74.7)	23.6 (74.5)	23.6 (74.5)	23.5 (74.3)	23.9 (75.0)
Record low °C (°F)	16.8 (62.2)	19.8 (67.6)	20.6 (69.1)	18.2 (64.8)	18.0 (64.4)	20.4 (68.7)	17.2 (63.0)	18.0 (64.4)	17.2 (63.0)	18.8 (65.8)	18.4 (65.1)	17.2 (63.0)	16.8 (62.2)
Average precipitation mm (inches)	6.8 (0.27)	28.5 (1.12)	78.1 (3.07)	125.9 (4.96)	181.3 (7.14)	119.1 (4.69)	114.4 (4.50)	140.7 (5.54)	154.8 (6.09)	169.7 (6.68)	148.9 (5.86)	40.0 (1.57)	1,295.3 (51.00)
Average precipitation days	1	2	5	9	11	9	9	12	12	12	9	3	94
Average relative humidity (%)	63	62	63	63	66	65	65	66	68	70	69	65	66
Mean monthly sunshine hours	269.7	234.5	238.7	201.0	189.1	186.0	207.7	210.8	180.0	179.8	201.0	244.9	2,543.2
Mean daily sunshine hours	8.7	8.3	7.7	6.7	6.1	6.2	6.7	6.8	6.0	5.8	6.7	7.9	7.0
Source: Instituto de Hidrologia Meteorologia y Estudios Ambientales

== History ==
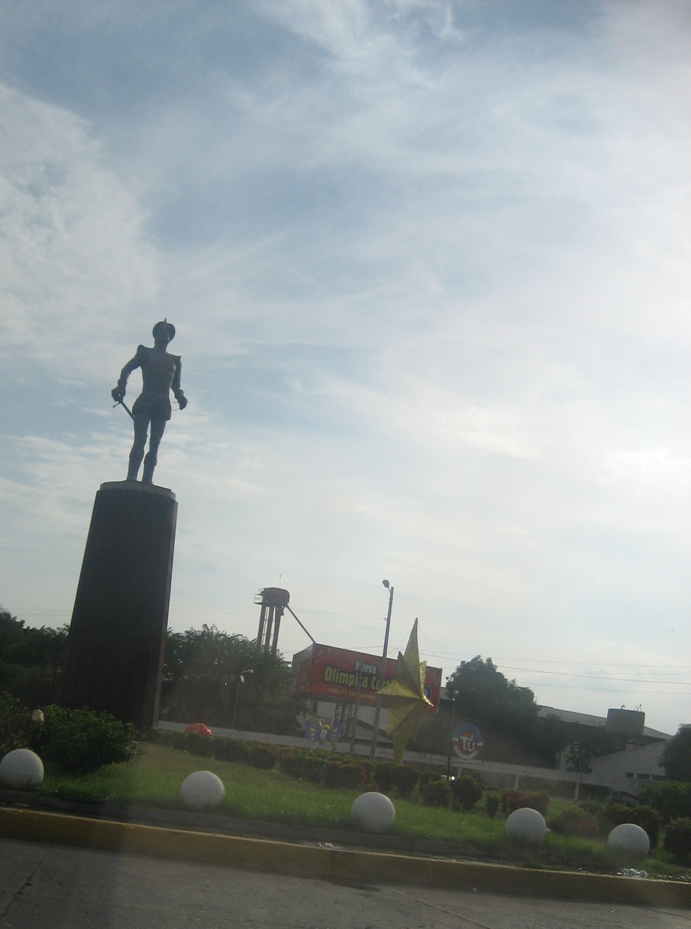
Statue honoring Cpt Hernando de Santana, founder of Valledupar.

The Spanish named the Valle de Upar (Valley of Upar) after a legendary local Amerindian cacique, Upar, leader of the indigenous Chimila. The region was first explored by Pedro de Badillo. It was conquered in 1532 by the German Ambrosius Ehinger, governor of Venezuela, who invaded the area belonging to the government of Santa Marta. The city was founded in 1550 by the Spanish conquistador, Captain Hernando de Santana, who named it. The Catholic Church commonly referred to the city as Ciudad de los Santos Reyes de Valle de Upar (city of the holy kings of Valledupar) because it was founded on the 6th day of January, Epiphany, the day the three kings visited the infant Jesus. The name was gradually modified to Valle Dupar and then to Valledupar.

Since the colonization period, the region has been a center for imports from the Caribbean area and distribution to the inland. Spaniards traveled through the area and established extensive farming, mainly rearing imported European cattle (among many animals) and agriculture. Much of the population of the Chimila Nation died from epidemics of new infectious diseases carried by the Europeans; survivors were worked at forced labor, and many died during battles.

On May 22, 1810, some 400 inhabitants of the Cabildo of the Valle de Upar rebelled against the Spanish monarchy, protesting against Mayor Colonel Marques de Valde-Hoyos. The mayor fled to neighboring San Juan del Cesar, leaving in charge V. Ruiz de Gomez. In 1813 independence from Spain was proclaimed by María Concepción Loperena de Fernandez de Castro, a wealthy land owner who helped supply three hundred horses to El Libertador Simón Bolívar's revolutionary army.

In 1850, the city became capital of the Valledupar Province and in 1864 was elevated to capital of the Valledupar Department of the Federal State of Magdalena. In 1915, after the political and administrative division restructuring of the Unitarian Colombian State, Valledupar was proclaimed the municipality of the Valledupar Province, part of the Federal State of Magdalena during the United States of Colombia era. The region maintained relative isolation from the rest of the country due to its low importance at the time. The violent political struggles of the different governments of Colombia took place mostly in larger cities, such as Bogotá.

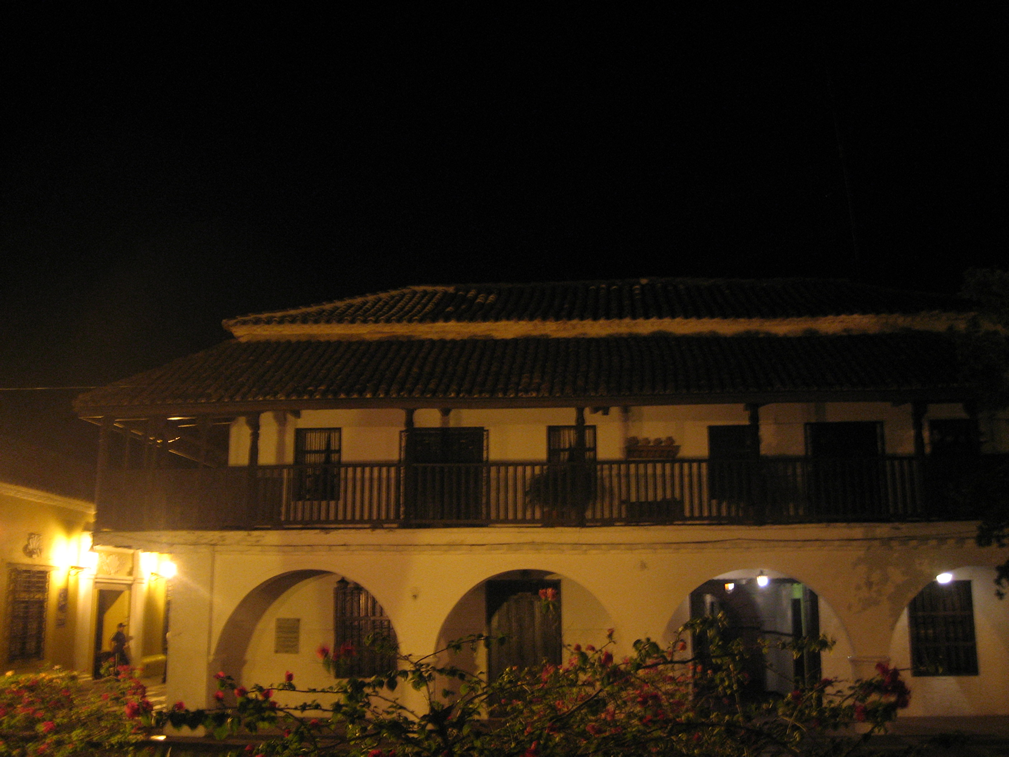
Downtown Valledupar preserves much Spanish colonial architecture.

During World War II, the city received many immigrants from Europe, especially French, Germans and Italians. Later it attracted immigrants from the Middle East. In 1956 it was proclaimed a parish by the Catholic Church. After the Republic of Colombia was created and the Department of Cesar was established in 1967, Valledupar became its capital.

The region started developing quickly due to political support from the former President Alfonso López Michelsen, first governor of the Department of Cesar's and the Colombian Liberal Party. Valledupar came to be known as sorpresa caribe (the Caribbean surprise) because of its rapid economic growth during the 1970s, especially in cotton production, which local people called "white gold". Valledupar ranked second overall in economic profits for Colombia during this time. Urban growth and social change accompanied prosperity and the city developed its cultural identity throughout these years. The revival of the Vallenato music strongly symbolizes the culture of Colombia.

A period of violence erupted during the mid-1980s, disrupting the peaceful growth. A struggling leftist political party, the Patriotic Union (U.P.), was led by a banker, Juvenal Ovidio Ricardo Palmera Pineda. Because of his incendiary remarks during a peasant strike and protest in the main plaza, he was jailed. After being given amnesty by Jorge Dangond Daza, the governor of the Department, Palmera went into hiding. The national government and conservative groups started a persecution of UP's leaders and followers. Many of Palmera's followers went into exile in Europe.

He escaped into the mountains, taking refuge with the armed branch of the UP; the FARC. Palmera became a guerrilla leader; as a banker, he knew who in the city and region were wealthy. He began kidnapping (and sometimes killing) prominent political leaders, journalists and rich land owners (including members of his own family), using the ransoms to finance his organization. He took the alias Simón Trinidad.

During this period, general crime rose and, on October 15, 1994, the national bank El Banco de la Republica (Bank of the Republic) was robbed. The amount stolen: COP$24,075 million of non emitted bills (some US$11 million) and came to be known as the "El Robo del Siglo" (The bank heist of the century).

To counter FARC and ELN's abuses, and after approximately fifteen years of asphyxiating Valledupar's society and supporting negligence by the Colombian military, some prominent leaders of Valledupar, landowners and those victims of these organizations decided to become part or promote, self-defense forces that later on affiliated with the AUC and assigned another "Vallenatean" as leader Rodrigo Tovar Pupo a.k.a. Jorge 40.

The self-defense forces adopted methods like the guerrilla, including illegal drug trafficking to finance their operations. They used terrorism tactics that also affected innocent people, such as selective and random kidnappings, and combinations of racketeering and selective assassinations – the trademark of Death Squads. The AUC helped take back the region from guerrillas, but Valledupar residents had to deal with similar uncertainty in having an illegal and terrorist organization controlling the city.

The AUC northern block demobilized March 10, 2006. It is still uncertain if the Colombian military can control the two terrorist organizations or dismantle them. Because of the longstanding violence, many rural people migrated into the city. Prominent regional leaders have been killed; others were forced into bankruptcy or out of the region.

Despite the violence, since it became capital of the Department of Cesar, Valledupar developed as an important agricultural and cattle raising center for the region between the departments of Cesar and southern parts of La Guajira Department. It is most notable as the cradle of vallenato music, which is played with accordion, a small drum (caja) and a scraping instrument (guacharaca). Since 1968 at the end of April, the city has held an annual four-day festival, the Vallenato Legend Festival.

== Politics ==
The Department of Cesar's government and Chamber of Deputies offices are based in Valledupar as well as other Department level entities. At City level, the Mayor of the City and the City counselors have a three-year term in office, and are in charge of local government issues. The mayor's powers are highly dependent on the budgets assigned by the Departmental government in order to execute plans.

Many local government leaders have been involved in corruption cases, investigated and sometimes incarcerated. The government bureaucracy is highly politicized, with the execution of some plans dependent on political interests and winning advantages over political adversaries. The local judiciary is also vulnerable to corruption, as well as being a target of terrorists and guerrillas.

See more: Political System of Colombia

=== Administrative divisions ===
In Valledupar 84% of the total population lives in the urban areas of the municipality with a density of approximately 68,4 inhabitants per km² (1).

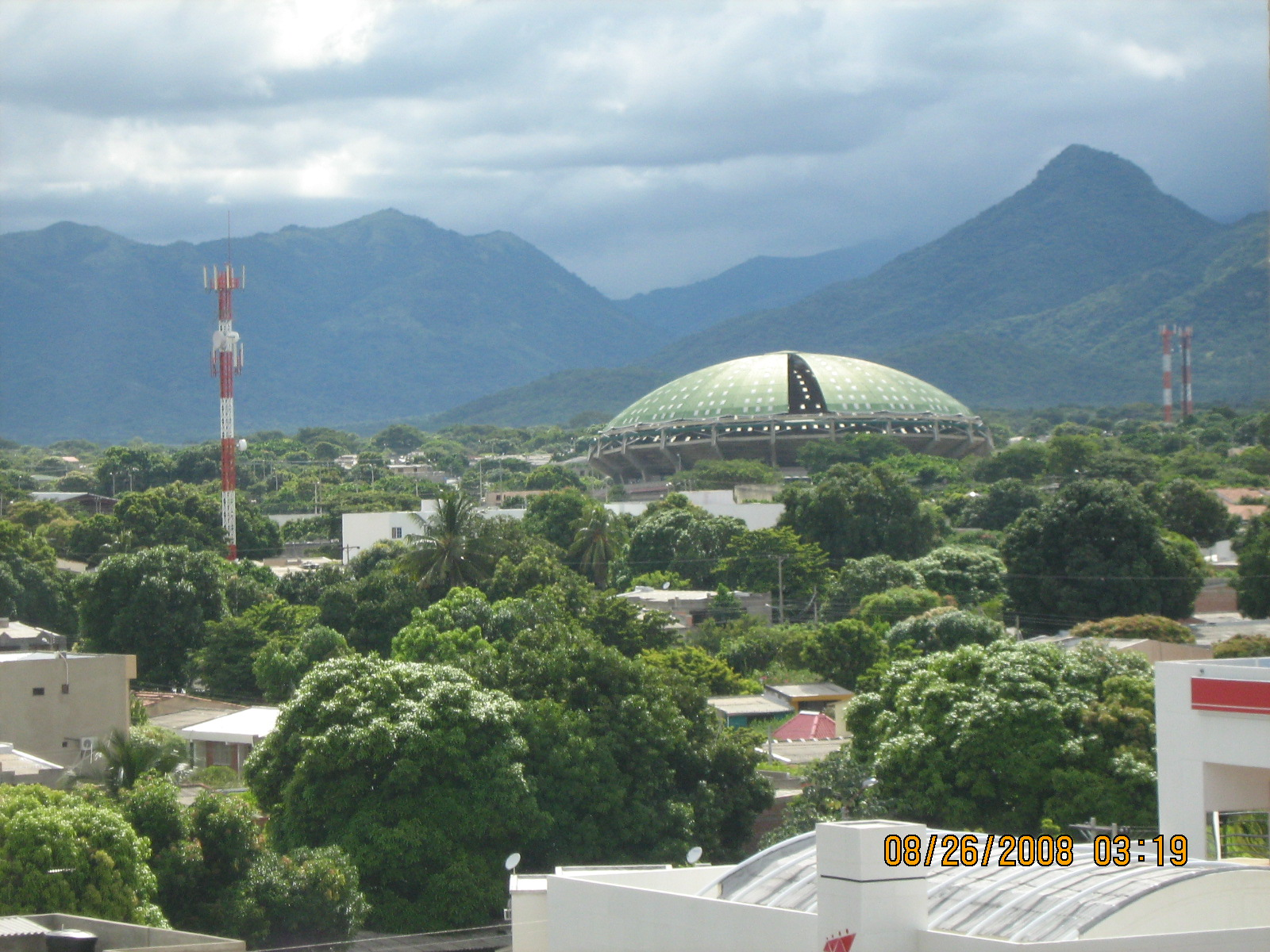
Julio Monsalvo Indoor Coliseum

Urban

The city of Valledupar is made up 6 comunas subdivided into 138 barrios and Districts.

==== Corregimientos ====
The Municipality of Valledupar is divided into six different geographic zones integrated by subdivisions called Corregimientos (25), and subdivisions to this called Veredas (125) and considered rural areas of the city of Valledupar:

- Northern Zone: 5 corregimientos divided into 42 veredas.

Corregimientos:

  - Atanquez
  - Guatapurí
  - Chemesquemena
  - La Mina
  - Los Haticos
- Northwestern Zone: 10 corregimientos divided into 4 veredas.

Corregimientos:

  - Guacoche
  - Guacochito
  - La Vega Arriba
  - Los Corazones
  - El Jabo
  - Las Raices
  - El Alto la Vuelta
  - Badillo
  - Patillal
  - Rio Seco
- Southeastern Zone: 2 corregimientos divided into 13 veredas.

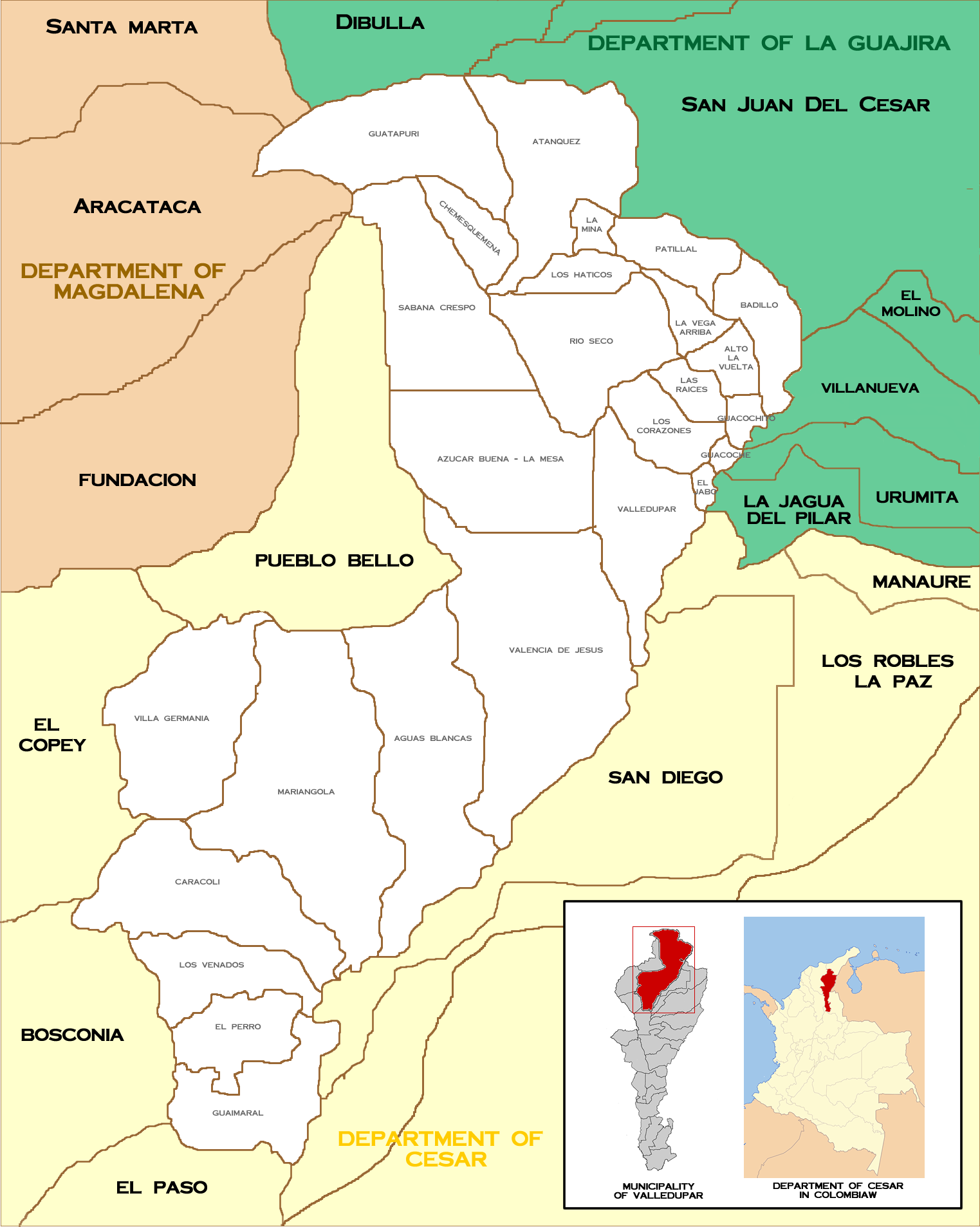
Corregimientos in the Municipality of Valledupar.

Corregimientos:

  - Aguas Blancas
  - Valencia de Jesús
- Southern Zone: 4 corregimientos divided into 15 veredas.

Corregimientos:

  - Guaimaral
  - Caracoli
  - Los Venados
  - El Perro
- Southwestern Zone: 2 corregimientos divided into 30 veredas.

Corregimientos:

  - Mariangola
  - Villa Germania
- Northwestern Zone: 2 corregimientos divided into 21 veredas.

Corregimientos:

  - Sabana Crespo
  - Azúcar Buena

== Demographics ==
=== Education ===
Education in Colombia is centralized under the Ministry of National Education according to the Constitution. The ministry also approves the functioning of private or state owned educational institutions.

The largest Middle/High school in Valledupar is the Colegio Nacional Loperena (Loperena National School). The high school institutions with the highest academic level in the city are the Fundación Colegio Bilingüe de Valledupar, La sierra International School, Colegio La Sagrada Familia, Colegio Gimnasio del Norte, Colegio San Fernando and Colegio Santa Fe.

The largest university is the Popular University of Cesar (Universidad Popular del Cesar) state owned, which has two campuses in the city. Other privately own universities operate in the city, such as the Universidad de Santander (University of Santander, UDES) and the Universidad del Area Andina (University of the Andean Area, AREANDINA). According to the Colombian Ministry of Education 2013 ECAES scores, higher education in Cesar is ranked among the 'lowest quality' in Colombia.

Technicals schools also operate in Valledupar, most notably the state owned, SENA.

Overall Educational Statistics

  - Kinder = 6,300
  - Middle School = 24,561
  - High School = 17,026
  - University = 11,910
  - Post Grade = 938
- NOTE: this statistic is from the year 2004.

=== Ethnicities ===
Three groups of Amerindians, part of the Tairona culture, are based near this region inside Indian reserves, all named for the Sierra Nevada de Santa Marta: the Arhuaco Reserve (pop. 18,500); the Kankuamo Reserve (pop. 12,000) and the Kogi-Wiwa Reserve (pop. 4,500). The Amerindian cultures have contributed traditional arts and crafts, as well as many crop management. Africans contributed to the food, religion and music and Europeans contributed to architecture, growth of the Catholic religion and other aspects, especially that of the Spanish colonial period.

The Vallenato music has been a creole fusion of these three cultures; the European accordion, the African drum and percussive elements, and the "guacharaca" from the Amerindians.

Other waves of European immigrants came during the 1940s to 1950s while trying to escape World War II or social crisis; mostly from Spain, Germany and France.

From approximately the 1960s, waves of immigrants from the Middle East started arriving in the city. They have been sympathetically nicknamed Turcos (Turks) by locals. Immigrants have been welcomed and are able to become part of society, marrying into traditional Valledupar families.

== Economy ==
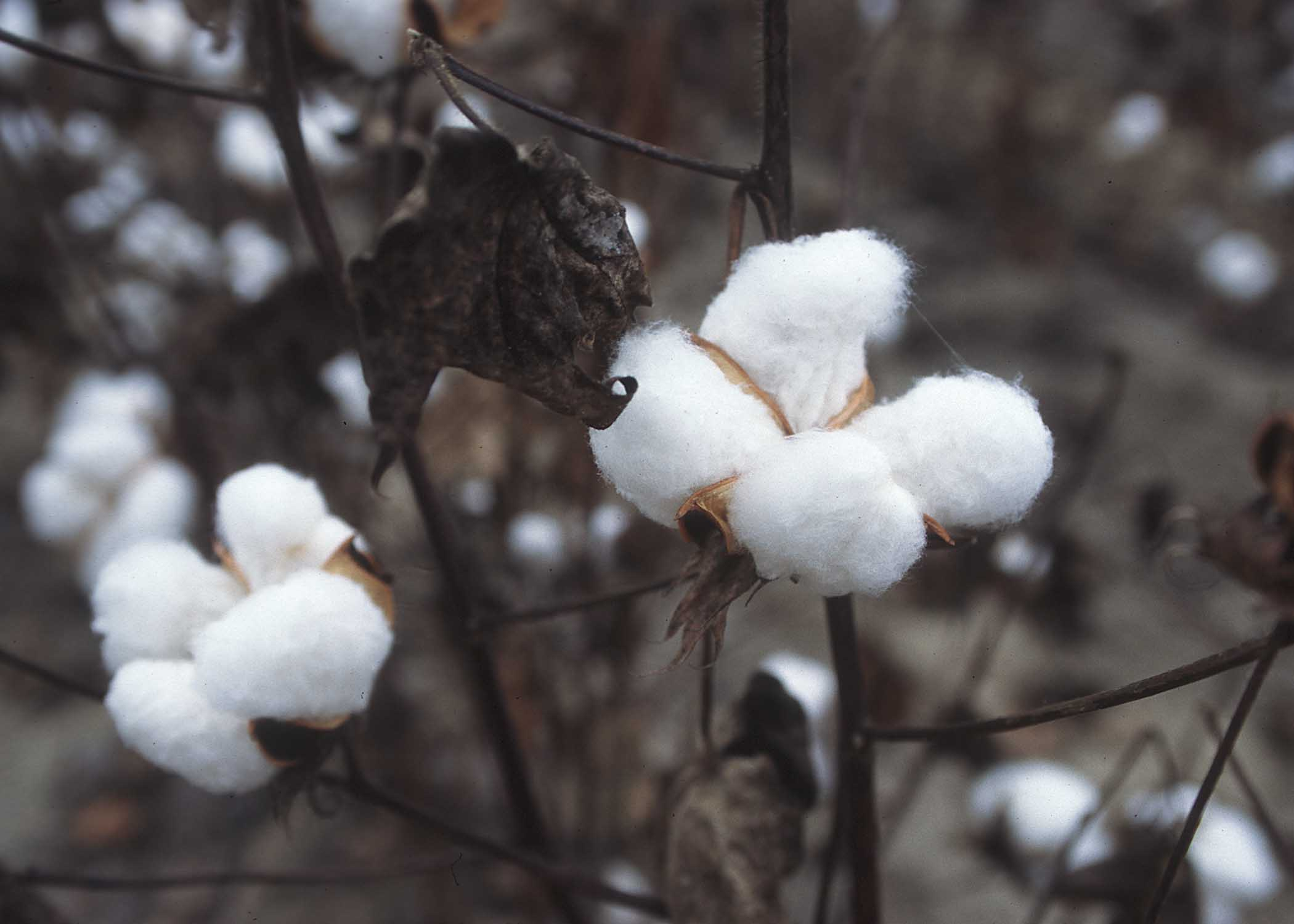
Cotton, once Valledupar's main commodity crop

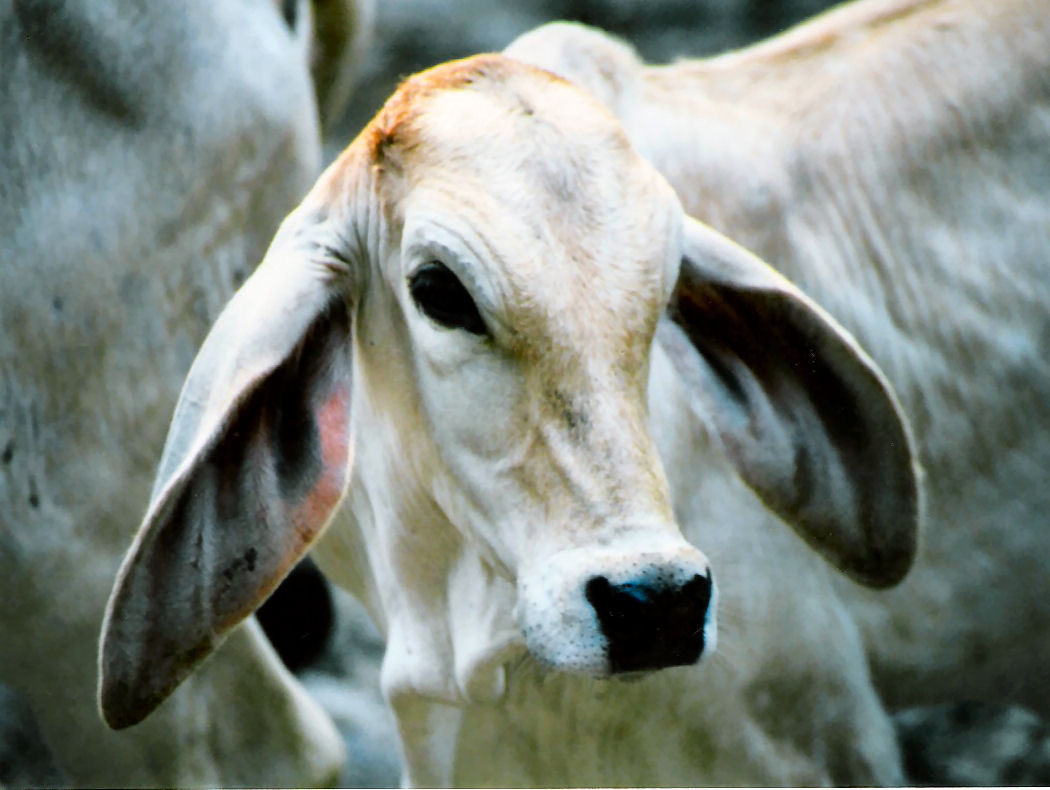
Young Brahman calf

The economy of Valledupar is based primarily on commerce, retail and banking in the urban area, mainly in the service industry and tourism during the four-day Vallenato Legend Festival. The city also serves as a business hub for the two nearby coal mines, Cerrejon (La Guajira) and Drummond (Cesar). The region's economy also relies on the primary sector; Agriculture and cattle raising which are the historical backbone of the local economy. During the 1970s, the region experienced an economic boom because of a massive production of cotton when worldwide demand was high. This helped to modernize Valledupar, and it became the second most productive region in Colombia for some time. The cotton boom ended during the 1980s because of a decrease in cotton production during the years of violence. The resulting economic recession left many in debt and unable to repay loans to the banks. During these years marimberos, or marijuana sellers, also produced and contributed to the economic boom, because of the high demand in the United States.

Valledupar mainly produces cotton, rice, oil palm, tobacco, coffee, cocoa and other cash crops. Since the late 20th century, the city has benefited from the department of Cesar's development of coal mining in the region of La Jagua de Ibirico and El Paso. The secondary sector has been flourishing from a few agricultural products and derivates from cattle.

Terrorist groups are still present and affect the local economy; The FARC, ELN and former AUC, mostly financed by the illegal drug trade. Other mafia-style groups BACRIMs have flourished in the region, shifting from illegal drug production to illegal trafficking of fuel from Venezuela as well as other products. These groups contribute to the illicit drugs industry in the region. They cultivate great quantities of opium poppies and marihuana around the area.

The region is using technology in order to develop into a more modern city. In a smaller scale, other sources of the economy are: fishing, transportation, construction, industrial manufacturing, electricity and gas, commerce, hotel industry, government, real estate, education, healthcare and domestic services.

The Vallenato Legend Festival, has gained economic importance because of its impact in Valledupar's economy. The Festival has become a destination for the tourist industry, and enables the promotion of other local products. The region's contemporary arts and crafts, ecotourism and cuisine have contributed to a growing hospitality industry.

In 2006 during the Vallenato Legend Festival, the Federación Nacional de Cafeteros de Colombia agreed to promote local coffee as one of their products, under the name Cafe Festival de la Leyenda Vallenata (Vallenato Legend Festival Coffee). This effort is to promote coffee produced by the local small and medium-sized farms from the Sierra Nevada de Santa Marta and the Serranía del Perijá.

Valledupar annually hosts one of the most important Cattle Fairs (Spanish: Ferias Ganaderas) in Colombia at the end of August. It is also an opportunity to feature other agricultural and domestic products.

== Culture ==
Valledupar's cultural background comes from three different major cultures; African, European, and Amerindian. The creolization of these cultures developed into unique musical styles, such as in the vallenato and cumbia. Valledupar was established as a Spanish colonial town, where colonists tried to reimpose what they knew in terms of familiar customs, food, popular religion, music, dances and Castilian Spanish.

Many descendants from the colonial period were converted to Catholicism. At the same time, practices have absorbed aspects of Amerindian and African cultures, as Christianity is syncretic. The holy week, in April, is celebrated in much the same way as during colonial times; with fasting, church attendance and processions to venerate Jesus and the Santo Eccehomo. Corpus Christi is celebrated in July. In religious practices, Christians represent the majority of the population. There are a minority of Muslims.

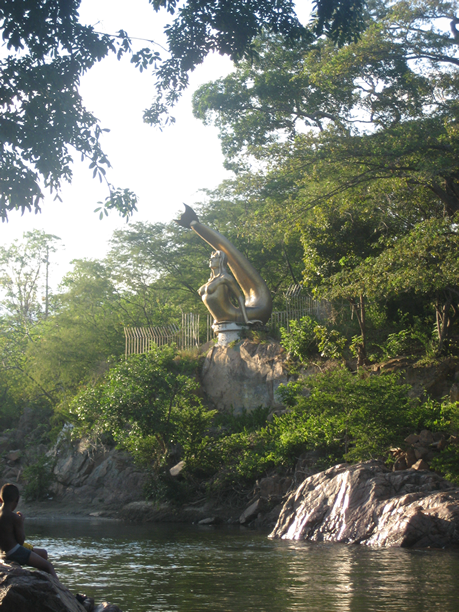
Monument honoring the Vallenata Siren legend by the Guatapuri River.

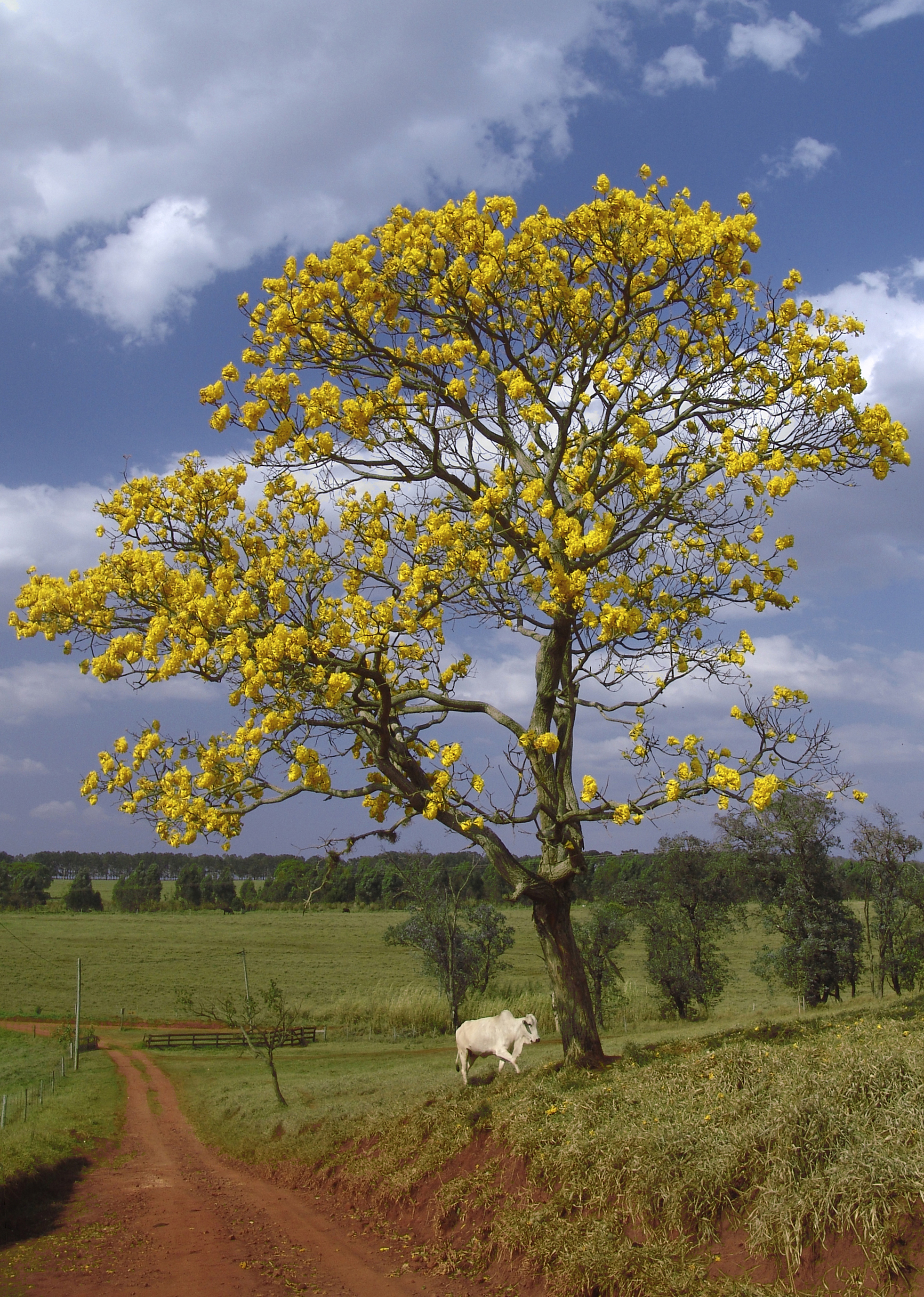
A flowering Tecoma chrysostricha known as Cañaguate colloquially.

Traditional oral storytelling has helped preserve stories, myths and legends, such as the popular "legend of the guatapuri mermaid", or the "silborcito" (the nazarenian without a head), "the Lerta" ("The duel between the devil and Francisco 'the man'"), "the monitos", "The llorona (the crying woman)", "la madre monte (mother nature)" "la mano pelua (the hairy hand)", and "el cuco", among other stories that are still alive. Storytellers are very common in the region, as well as traditional comedians. These storytellers, usually travelling farmers selling their cattle around the region, revived the already traditional Spanish juglares (minstrels). From village to village, they sang the news and stories from other towns, usually playing an instrument. This is how the Vallenato music was believed to be born.

Dances play a very important role in the cultural identity of this society, coming from the three different cultures that founded it, among this dances are: "Tambora La Cumaná" "El Pilon Vallenato" "chicote kankuamo" and "Los Diablos danzantes de Corpus Christi" (The Corpus Christi Dancing Devils). The latter originated in a colonial theater play, developed to represent the devil and good, in an effort to convert the Amerindians to Christianity. Valledupar also celebrates a carnival in February, smaller but similar to Barranquilla's Carnival. Carnival's celebration of pagan traditions, and quickly helped the African and Amerindian traditions to become part of society.

- Casa de la Cultura (House of Culture) and Escuela de Bellas Artes (Fine Arts School):

These two entities are part of the Colombian Ministry of Culture and their main purpose is to promote and preserve local cultural traditions, exploit cultural abilities from the region and promote an alternative to get to know different cultures.

- Libraries:
- Public Library Rafael Carrillo Luquez and its Consuelo Araújo Noguera Library section, was inaugurated on May 8, 2002; created with the main purpose of contributing to social, educational and cultural development of the community with an initial collection of about 12,000 volumes in all areas of human knowledge. It has achieved up to date, a space for kids, youth and adults, it has given access to all users in this society to literature workshops, plastic arts, music, conferences, expositions and local writer's book presentations.

General collection and reference: It has one lecture room with a capacity for a hundred people, with open shelves and open access to collections for users. Children's room and workshop: independently, it also has a lecture and workshop room for children, with a collection specialized in children and youth's literature, as well as audiovisual materials and other elements to work in plastic arts. In this room, starting at 10 a.m. on Saturdays, a project of story telling goes on called "La Hora del Cuento" (the story time) and on Fridays at 4 p.m. the presentation of movies for children.

  - On-line catalog: this system helps localize information that users need and contains local bibliographical material information that it's connected to the Banco de la Republica's national libraries network.
  - Audiovisual Services: the library also has three individual cubicles for the use of audiovisual material, mostly containing cultural and scientific.
- Shopping Center:

The city of Valledupar has two major malls; the Guatapurí Plaza, located north of the city, near the "Parque de la leyenda Vallenata". The complex was started in November 2007, with three major sections: Shopping center, which was opened in 2008, featuring more than 50 major national and international retail stores and restaurants. A Movie Theatre, opened 28 November 2008 and operated by Cinemark and a Hotel called the Sonesta Hotel that opened in 2009.

Mayales Plaza, inaugurated in 2013 is located East of the city of Valledupar.

There are three other major shopping center projects for the city, most notably MegaMall and Unicentro.

=== Sports ===
Valledupar has a football (soccer) team called Valledupar FC, which plays in the Colombian second division and the Copa Colombia tournaments. Many footballers from Valledupar play or have played in the Categoría Primera A or top divisions in other countries as well as the Colombia national football team, most notably goalkeeper Jose Maria Pazo. Notable international players include Humberto Osorio Botello, who played for Real Valladolid in the Spanish Primera División.

Martial arts (taekwondo, judo and karate), cycling, roller skating, basketball, softball, volleyball, and athletics are also practiced under the support of INDUPAL.

Valledupar native Oscar Muñoz won a bronze medal in taekwondo during the 2012 Summer Olympics in London while competing for Colombia.

Sports venues include the Armando Maestre Pavajeau Stadium (set to be remodeled), and the Coliseo Cubierto de Valledupar.

=== Symbols ===
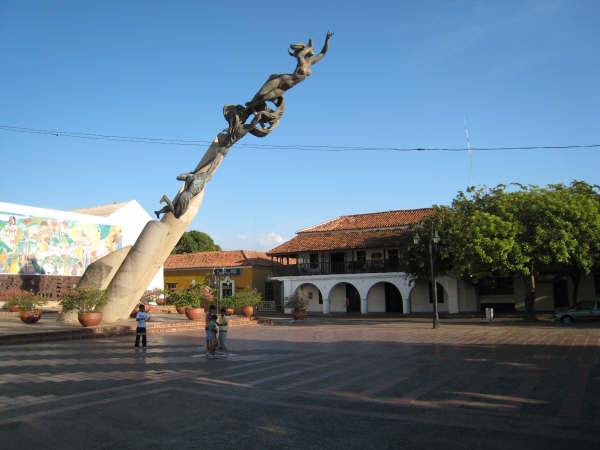
Alfonso Lopez Plaza in downtown Valledupar with a view of the "marching revolution" monument and the cityhall.

==== City anthem ====
See: Hymn of Valledupar Valledupar's anthem, named Himno de Valledupar, was established in 1984 by then Major of Valledupar, Miguel Meza Valera by public contest. The winner was Rita Fernández Padilla, a composer from nearby Santa Marta, with music arranged by Carlos Julio Parra.

==== Flag ====
The flag has three horizontal equal stripes of different colors;

- The top blue; symbolizes the sky and the rivers that flow through the region.
- The center white, symbolizes the white snow peaks of the Sierra Nevada de Santa Marta mountain and the wished peace.
- The bottom red symbolizes the sacrifices of the many through history who have helped develop Valledupar.

==== Coat of arms ====
The coat of arms was recently redesigned to meet new identities of Valledupar that now included the vallenato musical instruments;

- The crown on top with three peaks symbolizes the three kings that visited Jesus and also resembles the Spanish heritage and history of Valledupar, once part of the Spanish monarchy.
- The letters read the full name of Valledupar in Spanish; City of the holy kings of Valledupar.
- The top left picture shows the Sierra Nevada de Santa Marta mountain snowy peaks.
- The top right pictures the three main instruments of the Vallenato music; an accordion, a caja and a guacharaca.
- the bottom left picture shows a bull symbolizing the cattle raising and ranching.
- The bottom right symbolizes the agriculture; with the three main produces pictured; cotton, coffee and sorghum.

== Media and services ==
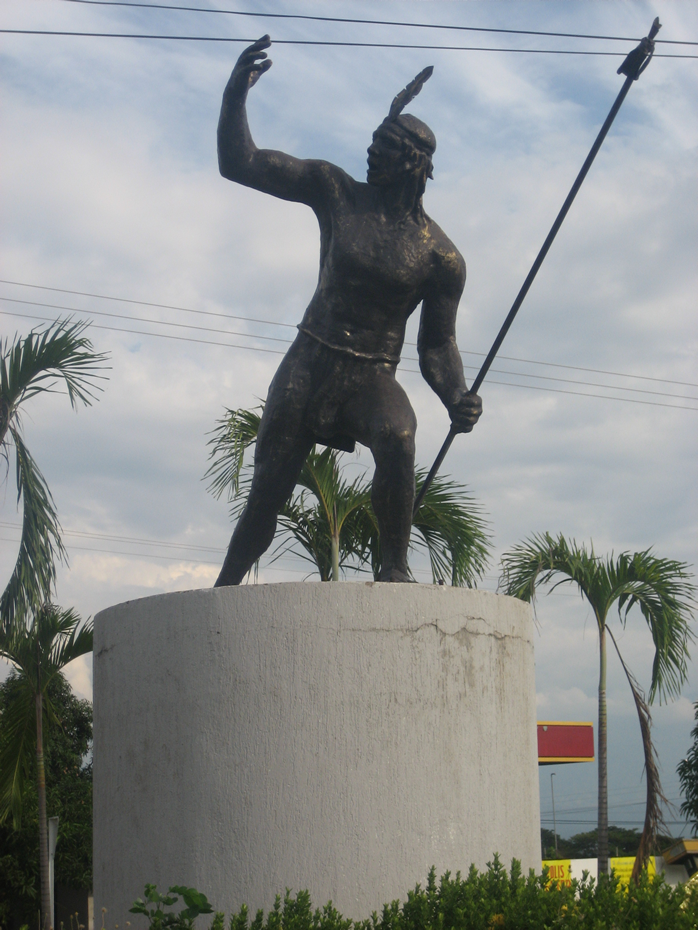
The Cacique Upar statue honoring the great Native American that ruled the valley.

- Newspapers: El Tiempo, El Espectador, El Heraldo, El Pilón, Vanguardia Liberal.
- Radio broadcasters: (F.M. (5)) Olímpica Stereo, Maravilla Stereo, Rumba Stereo, Cacica Stereo, Radio Policía Nacional. (A.M. (4)) Caracol Radio, RCN Radio, Radio Guatapuri
- TV Broadcasters: (3) Caracol TV, RCN TV and Telecaribe
- Cable TV and Satellite TV: (4) Claro, DirecTV and Movistar
- Internet providers : (3) Movistar, Edatel, Claro

== Transportation ==
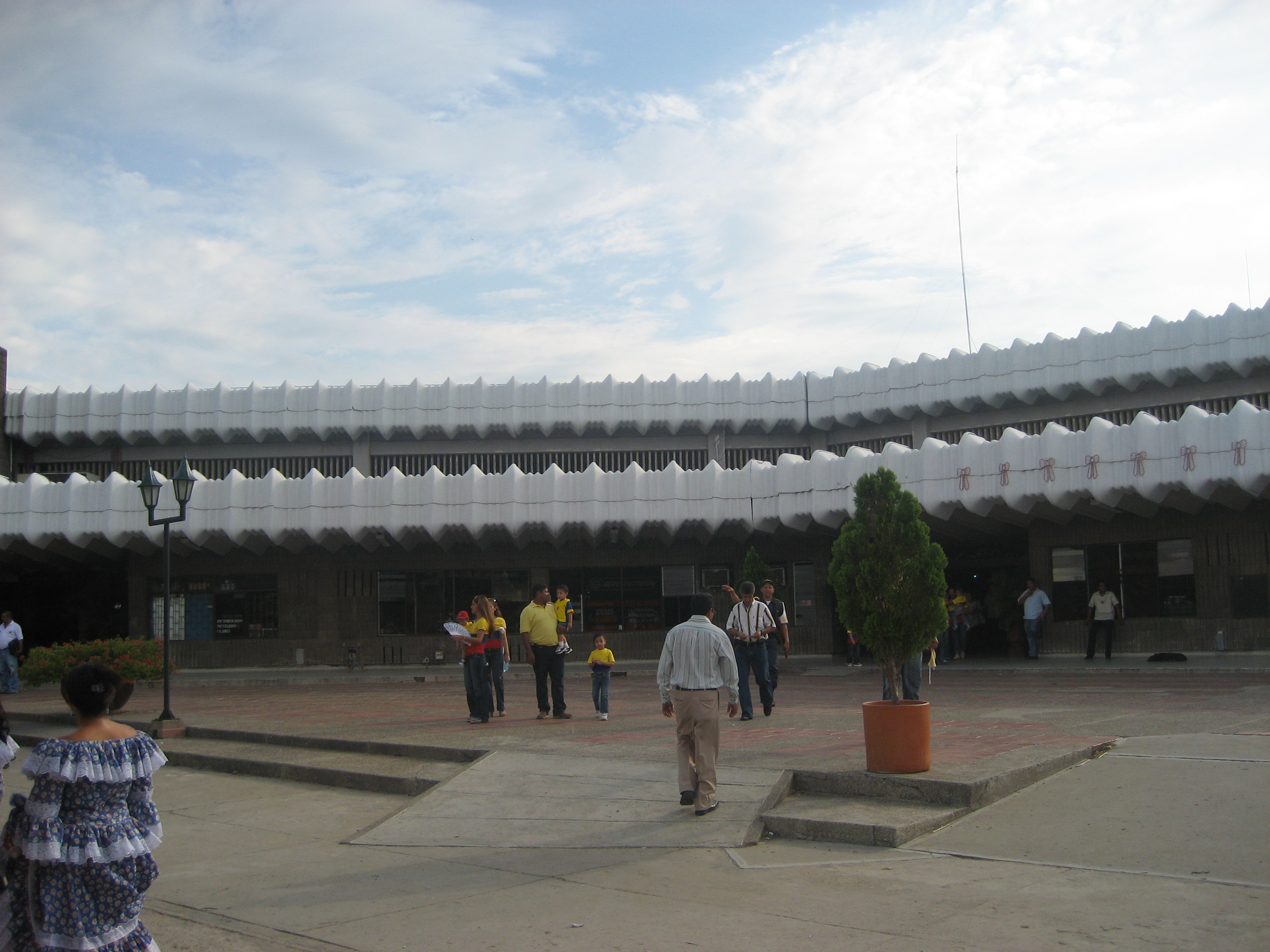
Bus terminal of Valledupar.

Valledupar has four different land entrances, and is crossed by national highway Route 80 from south to north. Route 80 is still under-construction, a segment between the village of Badillo via the village of Patillal and the town of San Juan del Cesar in La Guajira Department. As an alternative route 80 also crosses the town of La Paz in order to drive north to La Guajira. To the south, the route 80 highway connects with the rest of Colombia including northern regions of Colombia, like Santa Marta, Barranquilla and Cartagena; to the west two road access to some other villages to the Sierra Nevada de Santa Marta.

Valledupar's land transportation terminal provides national and international services through sixteen different bus or van transportation companies. Four of whom make trips to rural areas of the municipality. In the urban area transportation services are provided by taxis, and by private and government bus companies covering the entire city by shared routes. Lately, a new form of transportation was born, informal Auto rickshaws (mototaxismo), taking illegally over the bus and taxi services, to a point that are making them go bankrupt. The local government is attempting to penalize the use of Auto rickshaw for safety reasons and are also operating illegally, but because there are so many and tend to violently protest, the issue became difficult. In 2014 the local government expects to introduce the new Massive Strategic Transportation System (Sistema Estrategico de Transporte Público, SETP) with new routes and more modern buses.

Valledupar is served by the Alfonso López Pumarejo Airport, that receives national and some charter flights.

== Notable people ==
- Diomedes Díaz, singer
- Guzmán Quintero Torres, journalist
- María Concepción Loperena (1775–1835), independence activist
- Jaider Romero (born 1982), Colombian footballer
- Kaleth Morales, singer
