= Jaider Romero =

Colombian footballer (born 1982)

Jáider Romero
Personal information
- Full name: Jáider José Romero Romero
- Date of birth: May 22, 1982 (age 44)
- Place of birth: Valledupar, Colombia
- Height: 1.76 m (5 ft 9 in)
- Position: Right-back

Senior career*
Years	Team	Apps	(Gls)
2006	Real Cartagena		
2006	Valledupar		
2007–2013	Atlético Junior		
- * Club domestic league appearances and goals

Jáider José Romero Romero (born May 22, 1982) is a Colombian former professional footballer who played as a right-back.
