= Guzmán Quintero Torres =

Colombian journalist and reporter

Guzmán Quintero Torres was a Colombian journalist and reporter from the city of Valledupar. He was assassinated on 16 September 1999 after writing a series of articles two months before his death in which he denounced the involvement of some members of the Colombian National Army in the erroneous assassination of two women (one of them pregnant) and wounding some eight children after confusing them with guerrillas in the corregimientos of Patillal and San Juan de Rioseco.

By the time Quintero Torres was assassinated paramilitary groups, mainly the AUC were in the middle of a fight for territorial power and control against the guerrillas FARC and ELN. Both sides persecuted civilians who they thought supported the other group. Paramilitaries targeted any guerrilla supporters and aiders, human right NGO's that expressed any criticism, sometimes done along with active members of the Colombian National Army, ties that Quintero had also denounced in his articles.

Quintero consistently denounced parapolitical assaults on union leaders, peasants, politicians, and think tanks ever since the assassination of peace advocate Amparo Leonor Jiménez Pallares who worked for an NGO called red de Iniciativas por la paz (Network of Initiatives for Peace; REDEPAZ). Jiménez Pallares was assassinated on 11 August 1998 in Valledupar, Colombia.

== See also ==
- Colombian armed conflict (1960s–present)
