= Arhuaco language =

Chibchan language spoken in Colombia

Arhuaco
- Ica
- Ikʉ
- Native to: Colombia
- Ethnicity: 14,800 Arhuacos (2001)
- Native speakers: 8,000 (2009)
- Language family: Chibchan: Arwako–Chimila; Arwako languages; Arhuaco

Language codes
- ISO 639-3: arh
- Glottolog: arhu1242
- ELP: Ica
- Linguasphere: 81-EDB-aa
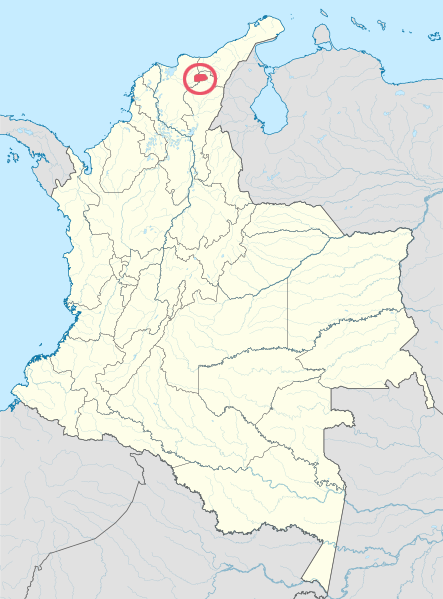

- Aruako is classified as Vulnerable by the UNESCO Atlas of the World's Languages in Danger.

Arhuaco, commonly known as Ikʉ (Arhuaco: Ikʉ) (also known as Aruaco, Bintuk, Bíntukua, Bintucua, Ica, Ijca, Ijka, Ika, and Ike) is a Chibchan language, spoken in Colombia by the Arhuaco people.

There are 8,000 speakers, all in the Sierra Nevada de Santa Marta region of Colombia, 90% of whom are monolingual. They have a very strong traditional culture and have vibrant use of their tongue. Literacy is 1 to 5% in their native language. Some speak Spanish, and 15 to 25% are literate in it.

== Phonology ==
Vowels
	Front	Central	Back
Close	i ⟨i⟩	ɨ ⟨ʉ⟩	u ⟨u⟩
Mid	e ⟨e⟩	ə ⟨y⟩	o ⟨o⟩
Open		a ⟨a⟩	

- /ə/ is raised to and merged with /ɨ/ word finally.

Arhuaco has 17 consonant phonemes:

Consonants
		Labial	Alveolar	Alveolo- palatal	Velar	Glottal
Occlusive	voiceless	p ⟨p⟩	t ⟨t⟩	tʃ ⟨ch⟩	k ⟨k⟩	ʔ ⟨ꞌ⟩
Occlusive	voiced	b ⟨b⟩	d ⟨d⟩	dʒ ⟨ɉ⟩	ɡ ⟨g⟩	
Nasal		m ⟨m⟩	n~ŋ ⟨n⟩			
Fricative	voiceless		s ⟨s⟩			h ⟨j⟩
Fricative	voiced	β ⟨w⟩	z ⟨z⟩	ʒ ⟨zh⟩		
Flap			ɾ ⟨r⟩			

=== Syllable structure ===
With some exceptions, Arhuaco syllables may begin with up to two consonants (the second of which must be a glide /w j/) and may be closed by /ʔ n r w/ or /j/.

=== Prosody ===
Arhuaco stress normally falls on penultimate syllables, with secondary stresses occurring on every other preceding syllable, in the case of longer words (e.g. /ˌunkəˈsia/ 'protective bracelet'). There are some affixes and enclitics that are extrametrical and do not count as syllables for stress assignment.

== Morphology ==
=== Personal pronouns ===
Arhuaco personal pronouns
person	singular	plural
1st	nən	niβi
2nd	ma	miβi
3rd	a	ikənaʔ

Frank (1985, 34) lists six personal pronouns for Arhuaco, with singular and plural numbers for first, second, and third persons. They "do not occur very frequently in text; they occur occasionally in subject position, very rarely in object position, and most frequently as the object of a preposition".

Unusually, person marking in Arhuaco verbs has evolved to have effectively become a way to mark epistemic modality or evidentiality.

== Syntax ==
The language uses a subject–object–verb (SOV) sentence structure.
