= Patillal =

Coordinates: 10°41′N 73°13′W

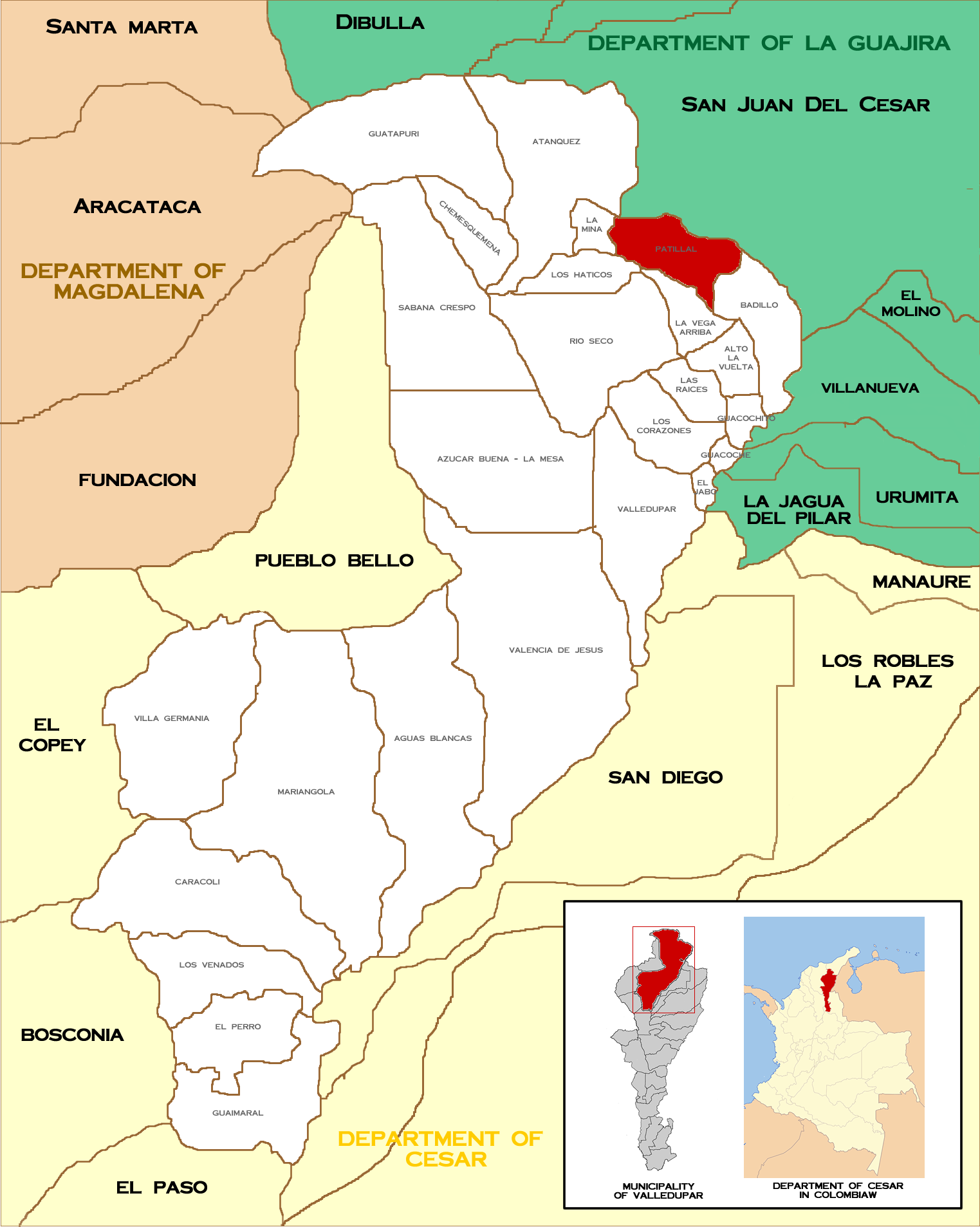
- Location of the municipality of Patillal (red) in the municipality of Valledupar.
- Country: Colombia
- Department: Cesar
- Municipality: Valledupar
- Founded: [[]]

Government
  - Type: Corregimiento
- Time zone: UTC-5

Patillal is a populated center of Colombia and corregimiento in the municipality of Valledupar within the Colombian Department of Cesar. The town lies on the steps of the Sierra Nevada de Santa Marta with a semi-arid terrain.

== Geography ==
The corregimiento of Patillal borders to the north with the Guajira Department, to the west with the corregimiento of La Mina, to the southwest with the corregimiento of Los Haticos, to the south with the corregimiento of Rio Seco and La Vega Arriba and to the east with the corregimiento of Badillo.

== History ==
The region of what is now Patillal was a cattle herd owned by María Antonia de las Nieves de Maestre and set as corregimiento before 1960.

== Culture ==
The village is mostly known for its vallenato musical traditions and for being the cradle to many musicians of this genre, such as Rafael Escalona. The village celebrates the vallenato music Festival of the Land of Composers (Spanish: Festival Tierra de Compositores) and the traditional Roman Catholic mass of venerating the Virgin of Las Mercedes every September 24 of each year.

== Populated centers and Veredas ==
- Guaymaro
- La Firma
- Villa Rueda
