= El Molino River =

River in El Salvador

- Location of mouth near Jiquilisco Bay

Location
- Country: El Salvador
- District: Usulután

Physical characteristics
- Source
  - location: Jiquilisco Bay
- Mouth
  - coordinates: 13°15′47″N 88°27′00″W

El Molino River (Rio El Molino) is the name of two medium streams in El Salvador.

- 13°15′47″N 88°27′00″W, near the Jiquilisco Bay in Usulután District.
- 13°57′N 89°57′W, near the city of Ahuachapán in Ahuachapán District.

Both streams have at least large to moderate quantities of fresh water year round, especially from early May through October.
