= Atanquez =

Coordinates: 10°42′N 73°21′W

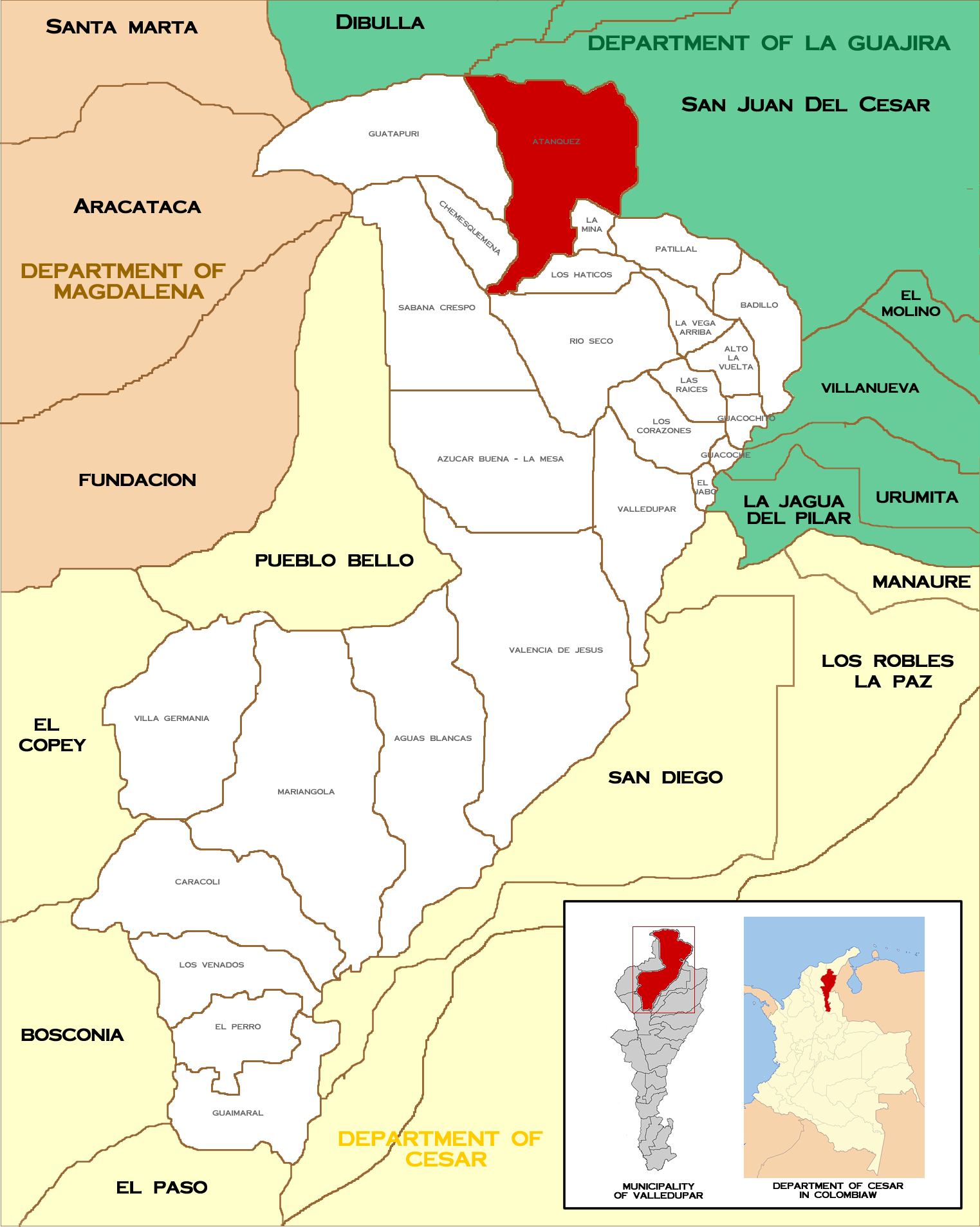
- Location in the municipality of Valledupar.
- Country: Colombia
- Department: Cesar
- Municipality: Valledupar
- Founded: Pre-Columbian
- Officially established: 1781

Government
  - Type: Corregimiento
  - Corregidor: Ricardo Romero
- Time zone: UTC-5
- Website: www.atanquez.com

Atanquez is a populated center of Colombia and corregimiento of Valledupar in the Department of Cesar. Atanquez is located on the Sierra Nevada de Santa Marta mountain range at approximately 2,000 m over sea level. Atanquez is known for being predominantly inhabited by the indigenous ethnic group Kankuamos among others and mestizo groups.

== History ==
Atanquez was an indigenous settlement founded according to oral tradition by a Mama (spiritual leader) named Tukaka. In the mid-18th century the Spanish had already colonized the plains surrounding the Sierra Nevada de Santa Marta mountain range and decided to also colonize the mountains and re-found the indigenous settlements. These indigenous villages were Atanquez, Maraocaso and El Rosario which grew in population due to the displacement caused during the period of Spanish conquest of the Chimila and Guanebucanes in the lower and surrounding areas of the Sierra Nevada de Santa Marta mountains in the 16th century.

The Kogui named these the "Wiwa", while the Arhuaco called them "Arzario". Former African slaves also established in Atanquez and formed the "Palenque of Atanquez". The Spanish sent Capuchin and Dominican friars to "civilize" the indigenous and named it San Sebastian. According to an order of the Royal Audience of Santa Fe de Bogota by a Sub-delegate Judge of Land named Don Agustín de la Sierra in 1781. The corregimiento of Atanquez was created by Municipal Accord of Valledupar 02 on January 4, 1906, and ordered by then Mayor of Valledupar, Moisés Martínez. Atanquez also became part of the indigenous Kankuamo Resguardo created by Resolution 012 of April 10, 2003, as established by the Colombian Institute of Agrarian Reform (INCORA).

=== Colombian armed conflict ===
Between 1986 and 2003 the Colombian armed conflict affected the region of Atanquez intensively with 197 Kankuamos murdered by paramilitary and guerrilla groups. The region was influenced by the paramilitary group United Self-Defense Forces of Colombia (AUC), and two guerrillas; the Revolutionary Armed Forces of Colombia (FARC) and the National Liberation Army (ELN). These groups flourished in the region due to the marijuana bonanza of the 1970s and later the use of their traditional Coca plants to produce cocaine and the introduction of amapola plantations.

== Economy ==
The economy of Atanquez is based on agriculture and the production of indigenous art crafts. The main products are panela, liquor from maize and sugar cane, fique, production of medicinal plants, local fruits and vegetables, Cacao and coffee which is commercialize in Valledupar.
