= Badillo =

Badillo is a surname of Hispanic origin. The name may refer to:

- Atilano Cordero Badillo (born c. 1943), Puerto Rican entrepreneur and supermarket businessman
- Arturo Badillo (born 1987), Mexican boxer
- Basilio Badillo (1885–1935), Mexican educator and politician; Governor of the Mexican State of Jalisco 1921–22
- Herman Badillo (1929–2014), American politician from New York City, U.S. representative 1971–77
- Juan B. Fernandez-Badillo (1912–1989), Puerto Rican-born American federal judge
- Julio Cesar Badillo (born 1966), American musician in Puerto Rico

Other uses

- 4866 Badillo, main belt asteroid
- Badillo Elementary School
