= Arhuaco =

Indigenous Chibchan ethnic group of northern Colombia

Arhuaco Ika
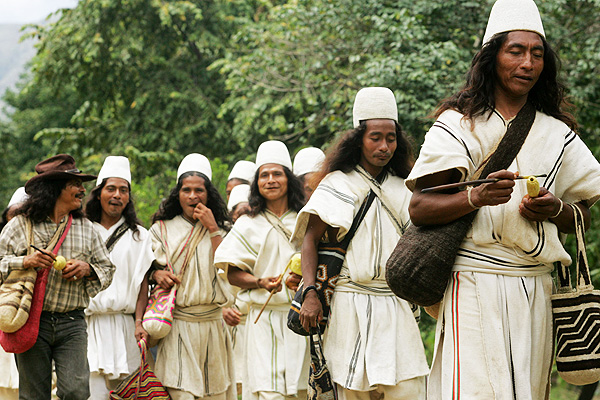
- Arhuaco men

Total population
- 27,000

Regions with significant populations
- Sierra Nevada de Santa Marta; Colombia

Languages
- Arhuaco, Spanish

Religion
- traditional tribal religion

Related ethnic groups
- Chibchan group

The Arhuaco are an Indigenous people of Colombia. They are Chibchan-speaking people and descendants of the Tairona culture, concentrated in northern Colombia in the Sierra Nevada de Santa Marta.

== Name ==
The Arhuaco are also known as the Aruaco, Bintucua, Bintuk, Bíntukua, Ica, Ijca, Ijka, Ika, and Ike people.

== Territory ==
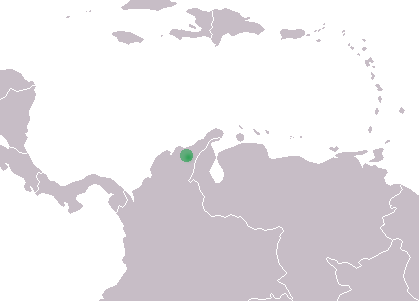
Location of the Arhuaco territory in Colombia.

The Arhuacos live in the upper valleys of the Piedras River, San Sebastian River, Chichicua River, Ariguani River, and Guatapuri River, in an Indigenous territory in the Sierra Nevada de Santa Marta Mountains. Their traditional territory before the Spanish colonization was larger than today's boundaries which exclude many of their sacred sites that they continue to visit today, to pay offerings. These lost territories are the lower parts by the steps of the mountains, lost to colonization and farming.

=== Communities ===
The Arhuacos are distributed into 22 sections.

- Central Zone: Nabusimake (Capital of the Arhuaco nation), Yechikin and Busin.
- Western Zone: Serankwa, Windiwameina, Singunei.
- Southern Zone: Zigta, Yeurwa, Gumuke, Yeiwin, Seyarukwingumu

pingumu, Buyuaguenka, and Simonorwa.

- Southeast Zone: Wirwa, Yugaka, Karwa.
- East Zone: Sogrome, Donachwi, Timaka, Aruamake, Seynimin and Izrwa.

The population is dispersed, but gets together in these towns for reunions and ceremonies, with Nabusimake being the most important of them and with a special significance: it's composed of fifty squared shaped houses and circular temples named Kankurwa, for men and women.

== Economy ==
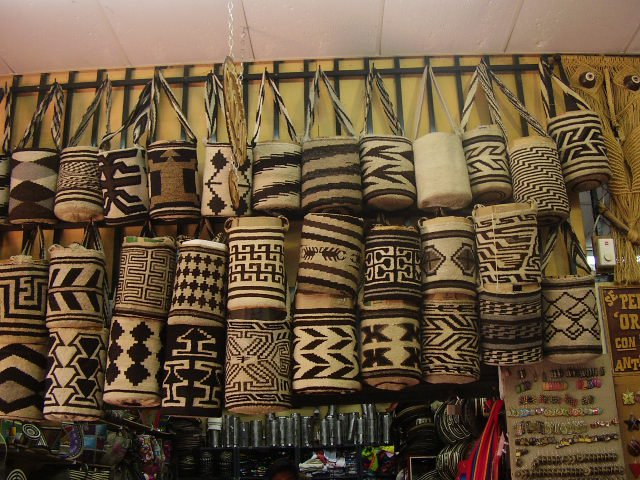
The Arhuaca mochila is a popular artisan bag in Colombia.

The Arhuacos' main economic activity is subsistence agriculture, which traditionally was practiced by every family in the community in their own parcel by their houses. Each family owned two houses, one in the high lands where the weather is cooler and another in the warmer, lower lands of the mountains. Nowadays they can only practice this on the higher lands due to expropriation of land during the Spanish colonization.

In the higher lands, they cultivate potatoes, onions, cabbages, lettuce, blueberries, tamarilloes, pumpkins, garlic and wheat. In the mid-lands; corn, beans, yuca, arracacha, malanga, coca, cotton, pineapple, papaya, guava, passion fruit, sweet granadilla, oranges and limes. Coffee is cultivated for commercial purposes only along with Arhuaca mochilas (handmade bags, fashionable among both males and females in Bogota and other major Colombian cities), and other arts and crafts to exchange in the lower lands for products they don't get in the high lands. They also raise chickens, cattle, sheep and goats. Men produce entirely the traditional clothing, but nowadays they also use modern clothing.

== Cosmology and worldview ==
The Arhuacos are profoundly spiritual and follow their own unique philosophy that tends to globalize their surroundings. They believe in a creator or "father" named Kakü Serankua, who engendered the first gods and material living things, other "fathers" like the sun and the snowy peaks and other "mothers" like the earth and the moon. They consider the Sierra Nevada de Santa Marta to be the heart of the world, and believe that the well-being of the rest of the world depends on it.

Nature and society as a unity are ruled by a single sacred law, immutable, pre-existent, primitive and survivor to everyone and everything. The material world can exist or cease to exist but this law is believed to continue without being altered.

This universal law Kunsamü is represented by a boy, Mamo Niankua. This law of nature is an explanation of the origins of matter and its evolution, equilibrium, preservation and harmony, that constitutes the fundamental objectives and the reason being of the Mamo; the spiritual authority of the Arhuaco society.

Each Mamo or Mamü is selected among different candidates, boys ranging eight to ten years old that will receive training for a minimum of nine years to fifteen years on average and are free to determine if they want to continue with it beyond the training period. To become a Mamo, they stay in a cave for nine years while the elders teach them everything they need to know. They specialize in certain knowledge areas such as philosophy, sacerdotalism, medicine and practical community or individual counselors. Their influence is decisive in their society.

== Political organization ==
The Arhuacos are politically organized as the "Confederación Indígena Tayrona" (Indigenous Confederation Tayrona) or "CIT", which was founded in 1978. Their main goals include the preservation of their culture and traditional territory.

== Conflicts ==
In 1916 the Arhuacos asked the government of Colombia for teachers to learn to read and write and also learn about mathematics, but instead the government sent Capuchin Friars. The Friars prohibited the children from learning about their culture, and put them aside in an orphanage. They also established forced labor, ignoring the Arhuacos' plea to leave them alone.

In 1943, politicians from Valledupar, missionaries and the Ministry of Agriculture, expropriated without compensation the best terrains of Nabusimake and built a State-owned, agricultural farm. The Arhuacos fought back and in 1944 created the Liga de Indios de la Serra Nevada (Sierra Nevada Amerindians League), but were outlawed later in 1956 by a military government.

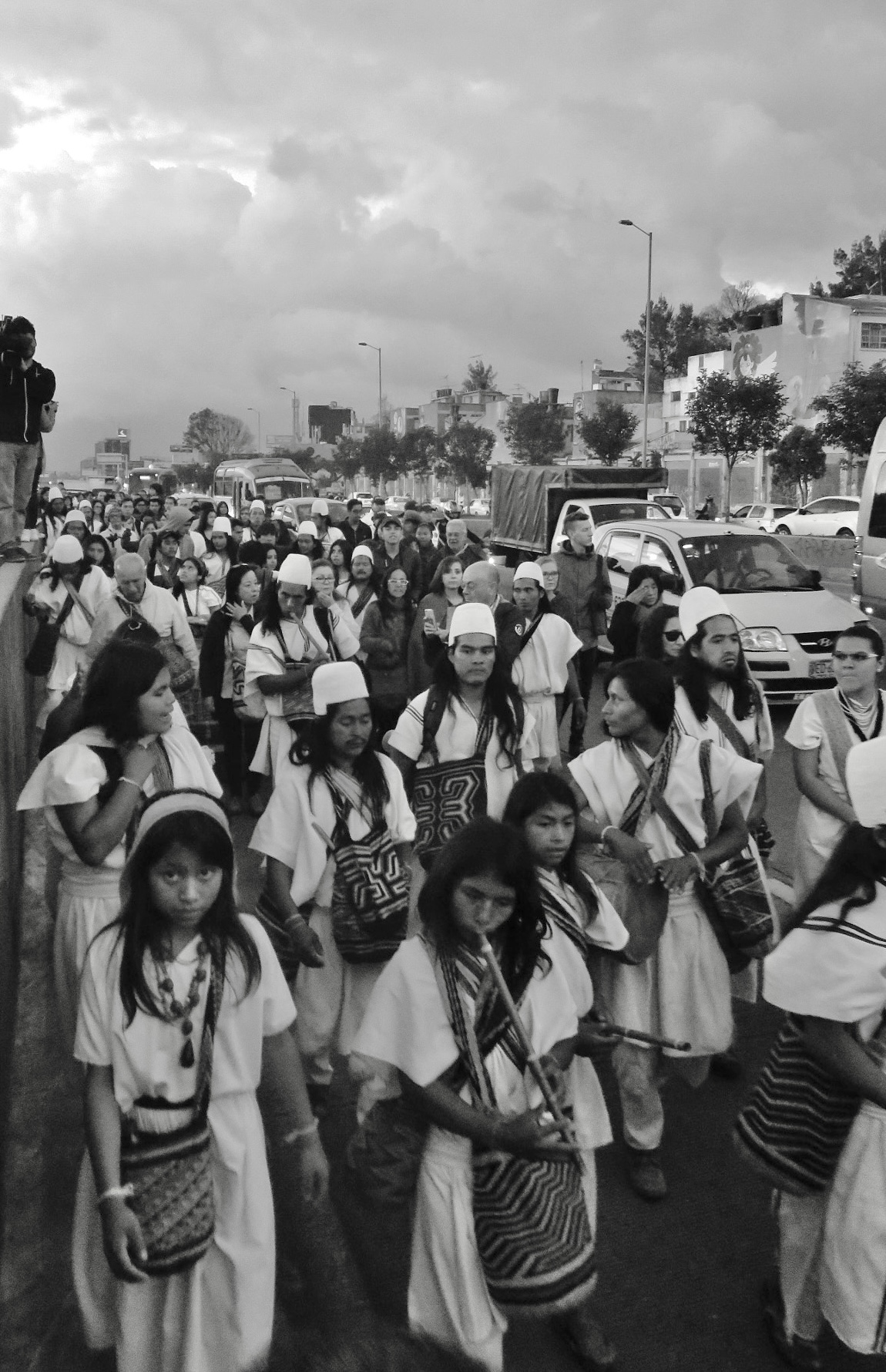
100 years after the six month-long march from the heights of the Sierra to Bogota, in 2016 a delegation of 100 Arhuacos arrived once more in the capital to commemorate 100 years of Arhuaco diplomacy.

In 1962, the government imposed the construction of a communications tower for TV in Mount Alguacil, considered sacred by the Arhuacos. This outraged them because they believe mountain peaks to be sacred. The government also established a military post to intimidate them, and later ordered the construction of a highway from their territory to Valledupar. Ignoring the threats, the Arhuacos reestablished their league. In 1972 the Arhuacos created the cabildo Gobernador, a better structured and adequate organization to defend their values and land.

On August 7, 1982, they rebelled against the Capuchins and took over the mission's buildings. The Capuchins finally left in 1983.

In 1990, three Arhuaco Indigenous leaders were kidnapped and murdered while travelling by bus to Bogota to register an official complaint about human rights violations by security forces against Indigenous people in Santa Marta.

In 2012 an Arhuaco leader, Rogelio Mejía, narrowly escaped an assassination attempt when his car was stopped at a roadblock by a group of armed men and riddled with bullets.

=== Prohibited cultivation ===
In 1975, Colombians started cultivating marijuana in the Sierra Nevada. This brought more problems to the community, like forced recruitment for plantations, assimilation of the drug dealers' culture by some, and violence. Many poor peasants from other regions of Colombia came to work in the Marijuana bonanza of the 1980s. Different from the traditional, non-commercial coca planting, the drug dealers produced cocaine through chemical processes. The money later attracted the Colombian Armed Conflict, and conflict among the different factions: mainly guerrillas and paramilitaries, who competed for the control of the area, and indiscriminately accused the Arhuacos and others of being collaborators of the rival party, assassinating and intimidating them, forcing many to leave. The government also started fumigations to eradicate illicit plantations, leaving the Arhuacos in the middle of a crossfire.

=== Government projects ===
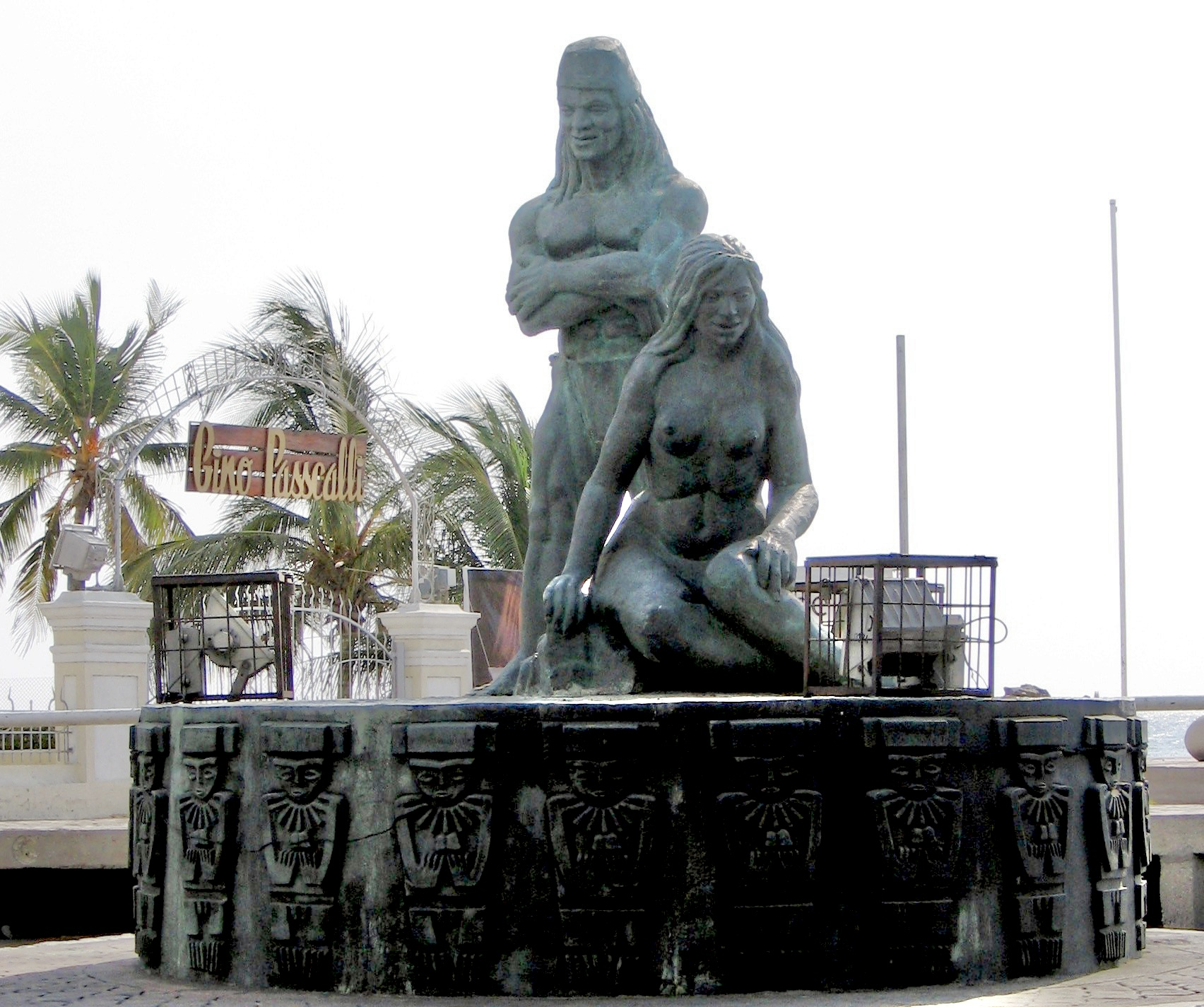
Monument in Santa Marta depicting Arhuacos

The government of Colombia is trying to develop an irrigation system for the Valley of Cesar by constructing hydroelectric dams and ecotourism routes in the Sierra Nevada de Santa Marta. The Arhuacos are strongly opposed to all these projects and organized the Confederación Indígena Tairona (Tairona Indigenous Confederation).

=== Armed conflict and displacement ===
In the 2020s, the Arhuaco faced a sharp escalation of violence as armed groups, drug traffickers, and paramilitary forces expanded into their territory, restricting movement, attacking sacred sites, and forcibly displacing communities. As a result, international bodies warned that the Arhuaco and other Indigenous peoples of the region faced the risk of physical and cultural extinction.

== Notable people ==
- Belkis Florentina Izquierdo Torres, judge

== See also ==
- Tairona
- Chibcha
- Kogi people
- Wayuu
- Valledupar
- Santa Marta

== Bibliography ==
- Arhuaco, Survival International
- (in Spanish) Etniasdecolombia.org
- Orozco, José Antonio 1990 Nabusímake, tierra de Arhuacos. ESAP, Bogotá. ISBN 958-9079-83-0
- Botero Verswyvel, Silvia 1987: "Indígenas de la Sierra nevada de Santa marta"; Introducción a la Colombia Ameridia:39-50. ICAN, Bogotá.
- dismalworld.com
- Pensamiento Arhuaco
