= Erik the Viking (video game) =

1984 video game

The Saga of Erik the Viking
- Developer: Level 9 Computing
- Publisher: Mosaic Publishing
- Designer: Pete Austin
- Platforms: ZX Spectrum, Commodore 64, Amstrad CPC, BBC Micro
- Release: 1984
- Genre: Interactive fiction
- Mode: Single-player

The Saga of Erik the Viking (popularly known as Erik the Viking) is a text-based adventure video game developed by Level 9 Computing and published by Mosaic Publishing in 1984. The game runs on the Amstrad CPC, BBC model B, Commodore 64, and ZX Spectrum.

It is loosely based on the 1983 award-winning children's novel of the same name by Terry Jones. A number of characters and items in the game are drawn from the novel, although the plot is completely different. Jones also directed the 1989 film Erik the Viking, which was also completely different, featuring a third plot not present in either the novel or the video game. England-based video game developer Eurocom worked for some time on an NES version of the game which was supposed to be based on the book and the film, though the game was ultimately cancelled in late 1992.

== Plot ==

The player controls Erik the Viking, and when his family is kidnapped by the evil Dogfighters, it becomes Erik's task to find them. In the first part of the game, Erik is on the mainland. He makes preparations for sailing, finds his weapons, and gathers together a crew, which includes Blind Thorkhild, Sven the Strong, and Ragnar Forkbeard.

Most of the game is set on the sea, with Erik steering his ship, the Golden Dragon, through the northern seas. He visits a number of different islands to collect the necessary items and meet the necessary characters to rescue his family and win the game. These characters include an enchantress in a cave hidden in a forest, the wizard Al Kwasarmi on a stone quay, and the enchanter's daughter Freya. The enchanter's study contains a list of the items that Erik needs to complete the game, and Al Kwasarmi makes them into the ribbon that Erik needs to rescue his family. A dragon may also interrupt Erik's quest.

== Gameplay ==
The Saga of Erik the Viking is a text-based adventure, in which the player inputs simple commands which Erik follows. As in similar adventure games, the world is divided into a number of screens or "rooms", all of which have simple pictures to enhance the atmosphere. The game's graphics were reminiscent of Beam Software's The Hobbit (1982) in that they are seen to be drawn on the screen as Erik enters a new room. The parser, though, was not as advanced as that used in The Hobbit, and was unable to handle sentences beyond set phrases. Additionally, the non-player characters do not exhibit the same independence as they do in The Hobbit, nor is it possible to command them to act. However, the dictionary on the parser was respectable for its time and the playability of the game was fairly good.

Erik the Viking is difficult to complete, having a linear plot typical of adventure games of this era. Failing to collect an object early in the game often means that a later puzzle cannot be solved. As in other games of the time, it is all too easy to die. For example, at one point in the game the Golden Dragon's sail will start to rip, and if you have not found the needle in the byre by that stage, you will drown.

There are a number of particularly challenging and occasionally frustrating puzzles for the gamer. One of the more clever examples includes finding the enchanter's study. This requires following a particular pattern of moves through seemingly endless corridors of yellow, red, and blue rooms. The amusing solution to this is that the colours are political: a red room requires Erik to move left, a blue room right, and a yellow room straight ahead. At one point, the instruction "Knock like Thor" requires Erik to use a hammer. The aforementioned needle that Erik uses to mend his sail is found in the unlikeliest of places: a haystack.

If the parser cannot recognise a command, the game will respond to the player with one of a number of phrases with which the gamer will be very familiar by the game's end. These include "Eh?", the response to a nonsense phrase; "Try again" for a command that is almost recognisable; and "Do WHAT to [an object]..." if the parser recognises the object in question but not the verb. Entering "TALK" or "SPEAK" will cause the response "Actions speak louder than words". One amusing feature of this is that the parser always uses the full name of an item, such that the command "TOUCH STEWPOT" will cause the response "Do WHAT to a large iron stewpot". There are also a number of tempting rooms or locations that look as though they can be visited at sea, but on attempting to visit them the computer responds with "The natives won't help" or "Erik finds nothing but sheep".

The game has a scoring system out of 1000, and when Erik dies a message appears stating how many points the player has scored and gives the player a Viking title accordingly, the lowest being Thrall.

As with its other adventure games, Level 9 Computing issued a "Clue Sheet" that could be ordered. This provided gamers with much-needed help to solve some of the more difficult puzzles.
