= Justin Pollard =

British historian, television producer, writer, & entrepreneur (born 1968)

Justin Pollard FRHistS FRGS
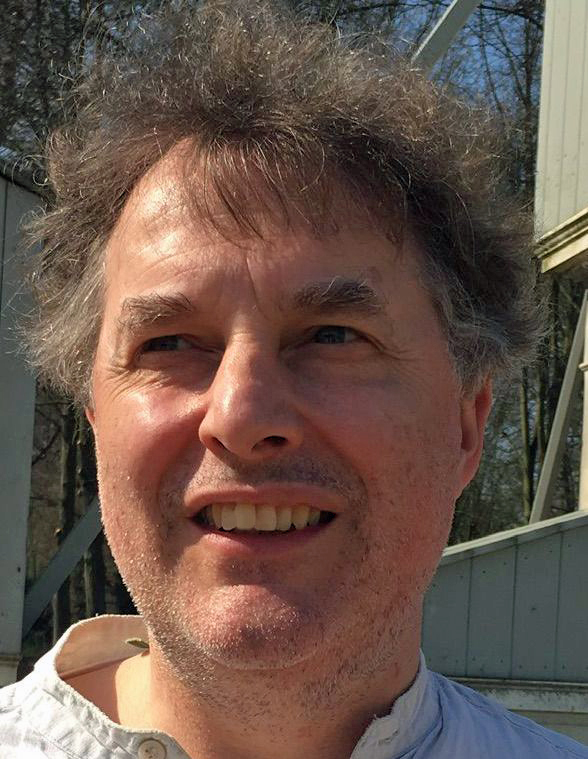
- Justin Pollard in 2022
- Born: Justin David Pollard; 30 January 1968 (age 58); Hertfordshire, England
- Education: St Albans School
- Alma mater: University of Cambridge (MA)
- Occupations: Author, Broadcaster, popular historian
- Spouse: Stephanie Pollard (m. 2000)
- Children: 2
- Parents: David Pollard (father); Valerie Medland (mother)
- Website: www.visualartefact.com

Justin David Pollard (born 30 January 1968) is a British historian, television producer, writer and entrepreneur. He is best known for his work on such films as Elizabeth and Pirates of the Caribbean and TV series including Vikings and The Tudors.

== Biography ==
Pollard is a popular historian, historical consultant and screenwriter working in the field of feature films, television and print. He was born in Hertfordshire and was educated at St Albans School and Downing College, Cambridge, where he graduated with honours in archaeology and anthropology.

After college he worked for a year as an archaeologist at the Museum of London on the excavation of Thomas Becket’s old monastery of Merton Priory. During that time he also developed an educational programme for schools visiting the Surrey Heath Archaeological and Heritage Trust in Surrey for which the Trust was awarded the Graham Webster Laurels at the British Archaeology Awards for their contribution to education in archaeology.

Leaving the Museum of London in 1990, Pollard moved into documentary production initially as a researcher, and then a writer and producer. His television credits include development and scripting for the BBC's QI, Channel 4's Time Team, including writing the Christmas special Time Team's History of Britain, script editing Bob Geldof's Geldof in Africa, and developing Terry Jones' Barbarians. He has also written the 3x1 hour history of the Egyptian New Kingdom for the BBC and Lion Television, Egypt’s Golden Empire, which was nominated for an Emmy Award. As well as these he has written and produced documentaries on everything from cannibalism amongst the Dongria Kondh in India to the career of Vlad the Impaler, for broadcasters including BBC, ITV, Channel 4, National Geographic Channel, PBS, A&E, Discovery Channel, Canal+, ZDF, S4C and ITN.

Apart from producing documentaries, Pollard runs a company that provides historical and script consultancy for historical feature films and television dramas. He has worked with Indian director Shekhar Kapur and was historical consultant on his features Elizabeth, The Four Feathers and Elizabeth: The Golden Age. He has developed other history-based features for directors, including Gillies MacKinnon, Sam Mendes, Jan de Bont and Neil Jordan. He was the historical consultant on Joe Wright's film, Atonement and has worked on two films with Johnny Depp - Alice in Wonderland (2010 film) directed by Tim Burton, Pirates of the Caribbean: On Stranger Tides directed by Rob Marshall and Les Misérables directed by Tom Hooper.

In television he is the historical consultant for the MGM Television/History Channel drama Vikings and has recently worked on all four series of the Showtime hit The Tudors starring Jonathan Rhys Meyers and Camelot (TV series) starring Joseph Fiennes for Starz (TV network). He is currently Co-Executive Producer and Historical Consultant for Bloodaxe (TV series)

Pollard is a columnist for History Today, Engineering & Technology and BBC History Magazine and a contributor to the QI books and Annuals including The Book of General Ignorance. His book World of the Vikings was released in November 2015.

Pollard was also one of the founders of the crowdsourcing publisher Unbound stepping back in 2014 and is a co-founder of security and intelligence consultancy https://opentheclosed.com. He is a Fellow of the Royal Historical Society and the Royal Geographical Society.

== Feature films ==
- The Pope's Exorcist starring Russell Crowe
- Mulan (2020 film) directed by Niki Caro
- Mary Poppins Returns directed by Rob Marshall
- Dracula Untold starring Luke Evans (actor)
- A Little Chaos directed by Alan Rickman
- Les Misérables (2012 film) directed by Tom Hooper
- Mary Queen of Scots (2013 film) directed by Thomas Imbach
- Pirates of the Caribbean: On Stranger Tides directed by Rob Marshall starring Johnny Depp
- Alice in Wonderland (2010 film) directed by Tim Burton starring Johnny Depp
- Red Tails produced by George Lucas
- Agora directed by Alejandro Amenábar (2009)
- The Boy in the Striped Pyjamas directed by Mark Herman
- Atonement directed by Joe Wright starring Keira Knightley
- Elizabeth: The Golden Age directed by Shekhar Kapur
- The Four Feathers directed by Shekhar Kapur
- Elizabeth directed by Shekhar Kapur starring Cate Blanchett

== Television series ==
- Bloodaxe (TV series) Upcoming Viking drama from MGM/Amazon Prime Video
- Those About to Die. Drama set in ancient Rome directed by Roland Emmerich Amazon_Prime_Video
- History: The Interesting Bits. Animated history TV series for National Geographic (American TV channel) and Curiosity Stream
- Vikings: Valhalla Drama spin-off from Vikings (2013 TV series)
- Watchmen (TV series) American superhero drama television series for HBO/ Paramount Television Studios
- Vikings (2013 TV series). Drama series starring Travis Fimmel for MGM Television/ History Channel
- Peaky Blinders (TV series)Created by Steven Knight
- QI (Series 3 onwards). 16-part comedy panel show hosted by Stephen Fry for BBC1
- Will (TV series)produced by Shekhar Kapur
- Britannia (TV series) written by Jez Butterworth.
- Camelot (TV series) (Series 1 to 4). Drama series starring Joseph Fiennes for Starz (TV network)
- The Tudors (Series 1 to 4). Drama series starring Jonathan Rhys Meyers for Showtime
- Alexandria: The Greatest City for Channel 4
- The Gunpowder Plot: Exploding The Legend for ITV4
- Geldof in Africa for BBC1
- Terry Jones' Barbarians. Series for BBC
- Seven Ages of Britain. 7 hour series for Channel 4 presented by Bettany Hughes
- Ancient Discoveries. 3x1 hr history series for S4C/ A&E
- $100 Ride. 13-part travel series narrated by Alexei Sayle for National Geographic.
- Egypt's Golden Empire. 3 hr documentary series for BBC/PBS/DDE.
- Time Team History of Britain for Channel 4
- Time Team Live from York for Channel 4
- Time Team series VII for Channel 4
- Time Team Live for Channel 4
- Royal Secrets for TLC

== Bibliography ==
- Seven Ages of Britain, 2003. ISBN 0-340-83040-9
- Alfred the Great: The Man Who Made England, 2005. ISBN 0-7195-6665-7
- The Rise and Fall of Alexandria: Birthplace of the Modern World with Howard Reid, 2006. ISBN 0-670-03797-4
- The Interesting Bits: The History You Might Have Missed, 2007. ISBN 0-7195-2420-2
- The Story of Archaeology: In 50 Great Discoveries, 2007. ISBN 1-84724-183-2
- Charge! The Interesting Bits of Military History, 2008. ISBN 0-7195-2304-4
- Secret Britain: The Hidden Bits of Our History, October 2009. ISBN 978-1-84854-198-6
- Wonders of the Ancient World: Antiquity's Greatest Feats of Design and Engineering, 2009. ISBN 978-1-84724-890-9
- Boffinology: The Real Stories Behind Our Greatest Scientific Discoveries, October 2010. ISBN 978-1-84854-200-6
- Buses, Bankers & the Beer of Revenge: An Eccentric Engineer Collection, November 2012. ISBN 978-1-84919-581-2
- World of the Vikings, November 2015. ISBN 978-1-45214-545-7
- Pollard, Justin & Stephanie Pollard (September 2017). "Pompey the Great, born 29 September 106 BC". Months Past. History Today. 67 (9): 22–23.

== Personal life ==
Pollard married BAFTA nominated TV researcher and producer Stephanie Farr on 18 November 2000. They have two children. Stephanie was diagnosed with terminal breast cancer in 2014 and died in 2023.
