= The Re-Inventors =

- Developed by: Chris Triffo
- Presented by: Matt Hunter; Jeremy MacPerson
- Country of origin: Canada

Production
- Running time: 22 minutes

Original release
- Network: History Television
- Release: 2008 – 2011

The Re-Inventors is a Canadian TV show based around exploring historic inventions and testing them. The show follows the hosts, Matt Hunter and Jeremy MacPherson, as they discover and reconstruct inventions to see how ideas from the past hold up in the present world. In each episode, the hosts choose a historic invention and attempt to rebuild it. The hosts would examine the original patent information, including blueprints, then, along with additional tradesmen as needed, build the prototypes, and test each of these, often strange, inventions to see if any could actually succeed. Often, a few related inventions would be tested in the same episode. Each invention was given a set of evaluation criteria before being tested. At the end of the episode, the invention was graded and if the invention was considered to have met the evaluation criteria, it was granted the title of 'Patent Approved'. If the invention proved to be less than effective, it was granted the title 'Patent Denied'.

The TV series was developed by Christopher Triffo, CSC; he directed all 35 episodes.

The show was hosted by Matt Hunter and Jeremy MacPherson. Matt Hunter is an artist and craftsman, and played the on-screen contractor on the Canadian lifestyle program Colour Confidenetial for 65 episodes prior to co-hosting The Re-Inventors. Jeremy MacPherson is a special effects artist and carpenter who has worked on hundreds of film and television productions, most notably X-Men, Chicago, Resident Evil: Apocalypse and K-19: The Widowmaker.

On History Television, two half-hour episodes were typically broadcast back-to-back in a one-hour time slot. It aired on the Canadian French TV channel Historia as Absurde et breveté and was dubbed into French. The series is airing in over 60 countries in 30 languages and is currently running on Smithsonian Channel, Charge!, and H&I in the USA. The first season was also released on Netflix USA on February 1, 2014.

== List of episodes ==
Note: Episode listing is based on the two seasons that aired on the Smithsonian Channel. The episodes from 2008-2009 were not shown on the Smithsonian Channel, and the show is no longer associated with or listed on the History Channel website, where the 2008-2009 episodes were aired.

=== Season 1 (2010) ===
| Episode Number | Name | Original Air Date | Synopsis | Inventor | Invention | Outcome |
|---|---|---|---|---|---|---|
| 1 | Fire Fighting | Oct. 6, 2010 | The team builds and tests two non-water using extinguisher designs from the past, one using chemicals combining to create an extinguishing foam and the other seeking to blow out the flames with gunpowder. | Clarence Macomber | Foaming Fire Pail (1896) | Patent Denied |
| 1 | Fire Fighting | Oct. 6, 2010 | The team builds and tests two non-water using extinguisher designs from the past, one using chemicals combining to create an extinguishing foam and the other seeking to blow out the flames with gunpowder. | Ambrose Godfrey | Exploding Water Bomb (1723) | Patent Denied |
| 2 | Double-Barreled Cannon | Oct. 6, 2010 | The Re-Inventors see what happens when you chain two cannonballs together and try to fire them at the same time. | Cyrus Thayer | Improved Chain Shot Battery (1860) | Patent Denied |
| 3 | Life at Sea | Oct. 13, 2010 | The boys build and test the Davis Life Pod, a device designed to save people trapped at sea. | Judson Davis | Davis Life Pod (1912) | Patent Denied |
| 4 | Syrian Torpedo | Oct. 13, 2010 | The egg which moves itself and burns! The team attempts to build an early Syrian torpedo. | Hassan Al-Rammah | Syrian Torpedo (1275) | Patent Approved |
| 5 | Bourne Submarine | Oct. 20, 2010 | The team attempts to build an early submarine. | William Bourne | Submarine | Patent Denied |
| 6 | Hydraulic Saw | Oct. 20, 2010 | Designed in 15th century Renaissance Italy, this saw was meant to harness the power of swift flowing streams and rivers and use this power to cut wood. | Francesco di Giorgio | Hydraulic Saw | Patent Approved |
| 7 | Wind Wagon | Oct. 27, 2010 | A machine, a cross between a windmill and a wagon, that had never been built and tested, until now. | Guido da Vigevano | Windwagon (1335) | Patent Approved |
| 8 | Ned Kelly | Oct. 27, 2010 | The Re-Inventors put homemade armour up to a ballistics test. | Ned Kelly | Body Armour | Patent Approved |
| 9 | Earthquake Detector | Nov. 3, 2010 | The Didong Yi was intended to provide information to the Imperial Court that an earthquake had occurred so relief aid could be dispatched. | Zhang Heng | Zhang Heng's Seismometer | Patent Approved |
| 10 | Battering Ram | Nov. 3, 2010 | Matt and Jeremy get medieval and recreate a full-scale battering ram to see how well they work. | Various | | Patent Approved |
| 11 | War Kite | Nov. 10, 2010 | 13th-century Chinese fire arrow technology and a 17th-century Japanese kite design are tested to see if they can help command the battlefield. | | War kite with fire arrows | Patent Approved |
| 12 | Pedestrian Protector | Nov. 10, 2010 | The "Automatic Device for the Protection of Pedestrian and the Vehicle Itself" patented by Heinrich Karl in 1932 is tested. | Heinrick Karl | Pedestrian and Vehicle Protector | Patent Denied |
| 13 | Aerosledge | Nov. 17, 2010 | The team builds and tests an Aerosledge. | Andrei Tupolev | NKL 26 Aerosani | Patent Approved |
| 14 | Ice Boat | Nov. 17, 2010 | The team builds and tests J. L. Finch's early 1940s ice boat against a modern design. | J. L. Finch | Ice boat | Patent Denied |

=== Season 2 (2011) ===
| Episode Number | Name | Original Air Date | Synopsis | Inventor | Invention | Outcome |
|---|---|---|---|---|---|---|
| 1 | Floating Suit | July 5, 2011 | Inventions ranging from shoes to suits that can help you from drowning. | John Edmond | Floating Survival Suit | Patent Approved |
| 1 | Floating Suit | July 5, 2011 | Inventions ranging from shoes to suits that can help you from drowning. | | Floating Boat Shoes | Patent Denied |
| 2 | Gun Helmet | July 12, 2011 | A World War I era helmet gun is built to see who would be in more danger, the user or the target. | Albert Pratt | Gun Helmet | Patent Approved |
| 3 | Flying Machine | July 19, 2011 | See if some of the ideas that were put forward to figure out how to fly could have beaten the Wright brothers to the sky. | | Human-Powered Helicopter | Patent Denied |
| 3 | Flying Machine | July 19, 2011 | See if some of the ideas that were put forward to figure out how to fly could have beaten the Wright brothers to the sky. | W.O. Airs | Multiple-propeller human-powered helicopter | Patent Denied |
| 4 | Flying Car | July 26, 2011 | With the advent and spread of airplanes and automobiles in the beginning of the 20th century an idea emerged that a marriage of the two would create the ultimate travel miracle. | Moulton Taylor | Taylor Aerocar | Patent Approved |
| 5 | Monowheel | August 2, 2011 | Matt and Jeremy test out designs for a couple of monowheels. | Vernon Venerable | Human-powered Monowheel | Patent Denied |
| 5 | Monowheel | August 2, 2011 | Matt and Jeremy test out designs for a couple of monowheels. | Frank Marcovski | Pneumatic bicycle crash suit | Patent Denied |
| 6 | Invention War | August 2, 2011 | In this episode, Matt and Jeremy modify a number of their previous inventions and pit them against one another in a bizarre battle scenario. | Matt and Jeremy | Chinese Flamethrower - Added pressurized air tank | No decision |
| 6 | Invention War | August 2, 2011 | In this episode, Matt and Jeremy modify a number of their previous inventions and pit them against one another in a bizarre battle scenario. | Matt and Jeremy | DaVinci's Tank - Added machine gun and flamethrower | No decision |
| 6 | Invention War | August 2, 2011 | In this episode, Matt and Jeremy modify a number of their previous inventions and pit them against one another in a bizarre battle scenario. | Matt and Jeremy | DaVinci's Multibarrel Musket - Converted to breech-loader | No decision |
| 6 | Invention War | August 2, 2011 | In this episode, Matt and Jeremy modify a number of their previous inventions and pit them against one another in a bizarre battle scenario. | Matt and Jeremy | Rotating Catapult - Added an electric motor | No decision |
| 7 | Panjandrum | August 9, 2011 | The team tries to figure out where the World War II Allies went wrong with the Panjandrum project. | British Navy's Directorate of Miscellaneous Weapons Development | Panjandrum | Patent Denied |
| 8 | Snow Annihilator | August 9, 2011 | The inventor of the Snow Annihilator claims the machine has all the answers to winter road maintenance and is tested against the Canadian winter. | Benjamin Roman | Snow Annihilating Machine (1939) | Patent Denied |
| 9 | Solar Crematorium | August 16, 2011 | The Re-Inventors test out the idea for the Solar Crematorium, an invention that used sunlight to cremate dead bodies. | Kenneth H. Gardner | Solar Powered Crematorium | Patent Approved |
| 9 | Solar Crematorium | August 16, 2011 | The Re-Inventors test out the idea for the Solar Crematorium, an invention that used sunlight to cremate dead bodies. | | Coffin Alarm Bell | Patent Denied |
| 10 | Body Armor | August 16, 2011 | Two designs from World War I in an attempt to aid a soldier from dangerous weapons. | Alfred Bailey | Bullet-Proof Enclosure (1915) | Patent Approved |
| 10 | Body Armor | August 16, 2011 | Two designs from World War I in an attempt to aid a soldier from dangerous weapons. | L.M. Norwood | Combined Trench Shield & Helmet for Soldiers (1915) | Patent Denied |
| 11 | Roman Crane | August 24, 2011 | The team attempts to build the Roman crane. | Ancient Romans | Human-Powered Crane | Patent Approved |
| 12 | Chinese Rocket | August 31, 2011 | The Chinese were the first to design and construct a multi-stage rocket. | Chinese Navy | Chinese Rocket (1300s) | |

=== Unlisted Episodes (2008–2009) ===
| Name | Synopsis | Inventor | Invention | Outcome |
|---|---|---|---|---|
| Chinese Flamethrower | The Re-Inventors try to build one of the world's first flamethrower designs. | | Double-action flamethrower | Patent Approved |
| Da Vinci Chariot | Matt and Jeremy find out if Da Vinci's chariot could have found a place on the 15th-century battlefield. | Leonardo da Vinci | Scythe War Chariot | Patent Approved |
| Da Vinci Gun | Leonardo da Vinci designed the world's first 12-barrel machine gun. The team tests how effective it could be in offence and defence. | Leonardo da Vinci | Multi-barrel musket | Patent Approved |
| Da Vinci Tank | The team attempts to build one of Da Vinci's most ambitious projects. | Leonardo da Vinci | Multiple cannon wheeled mobile armoured platform. | Patent Approved |
| Four-Armed Catapult | A design for a 13th-century four-armed catapult that shoots projectiles, using some elements of traditional catapults and trebuchets. | | 4-armed gravity-driven catapult | Patent Denied |
| Head Parachute | Getting people out of a burning high-rise building has been a challenge faced by inventors and designers since people started living in them. | | Head Parachute | Patent Denied |
| Head Parachute | Getting people out of a burning high-rise building has been a challenge faced by inventors and designers since people started living in them. | | Fire Basket | Patent Denied |
| Head Parachute | Getting people out of a burning high-rise building has been a challenge faced by inventors and designers since people started living in them. | | Modified Parachute for use by light passengers only | Patent Approved |
| Human Propulsion | Matt and Jeremy combine machines with muscle and add some rockets, propellers, and jets into the mix. | Horace Morrow | Propeller-driven skating (1948) | Patent Denied |
| Human Propulsion | Matt and Jeremy combine machines with muscle and add some rockets, propellers, and jets into the mix. | Godfried Mayer | Rocket-Propelled Skis (1962) | Patent Denied |
| Human Propulsion | Matt and Jeremy combine machines with muscle and add some rockets, propellers, and jets into the mix. | Godfried Mayer | Jet-Propelled Skis (1962) | Patent Denied |
| Incinerating Toilet | As populations have increased over the years, so have the ideas for disposal, removal, and processing regarding waste. | Hardy Sunberg | Dry Waste Incinerating Toilet (1966) | Patent Denied |
| Incinerating Toilet | As populations have increased over the years, so have the ideas for disposal, removal, and processing regarding waste. | Norman Street | Personal Waste Disposal Garment (1993) | Patent Denied |
| Windmill | The team digs out plans for an Islamic windmill design. | | Islamic Windmill | Patent Approved |

== See also ==
- Ancient Discoveries
- Ancient Inventions
- MythBusters
- Patent Bending
- Prototype This!
