= Horo (cloak) =

Cloak worn by samurai

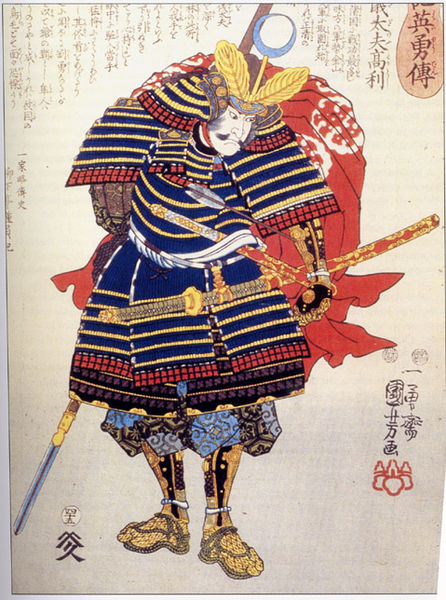
A samurai wearing the horo, a garment used as a defense against arrows

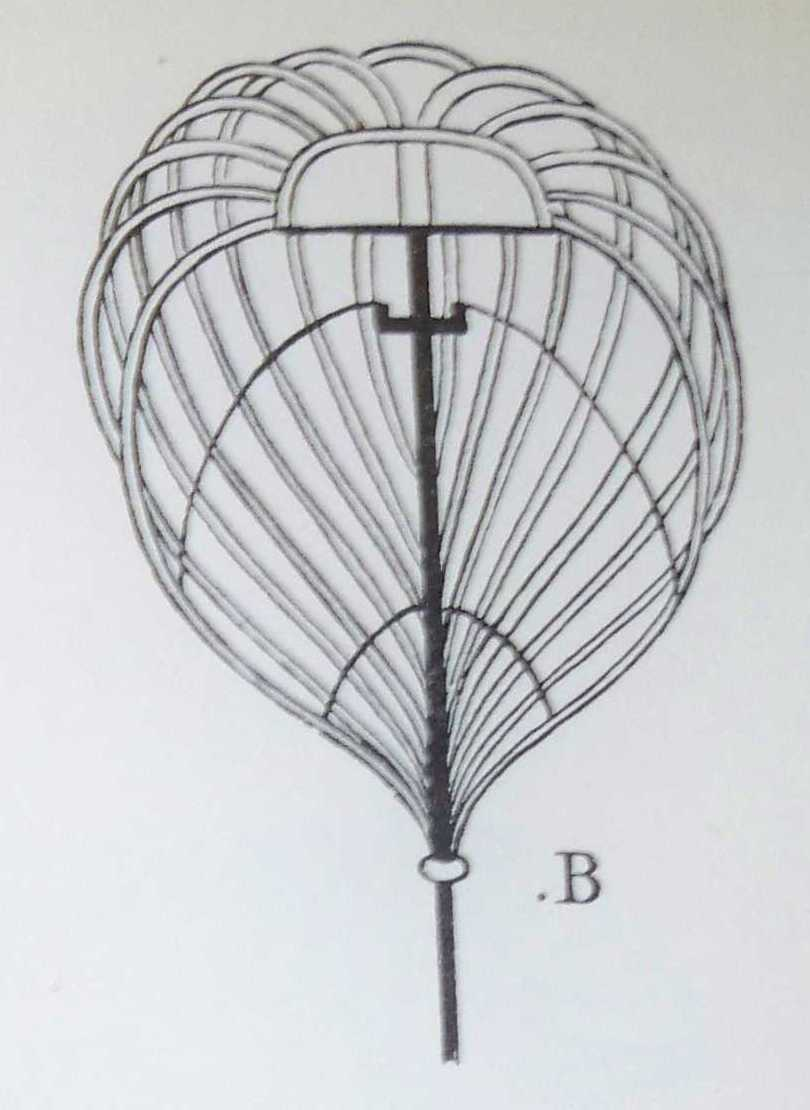
Oikago, the framework of a horo

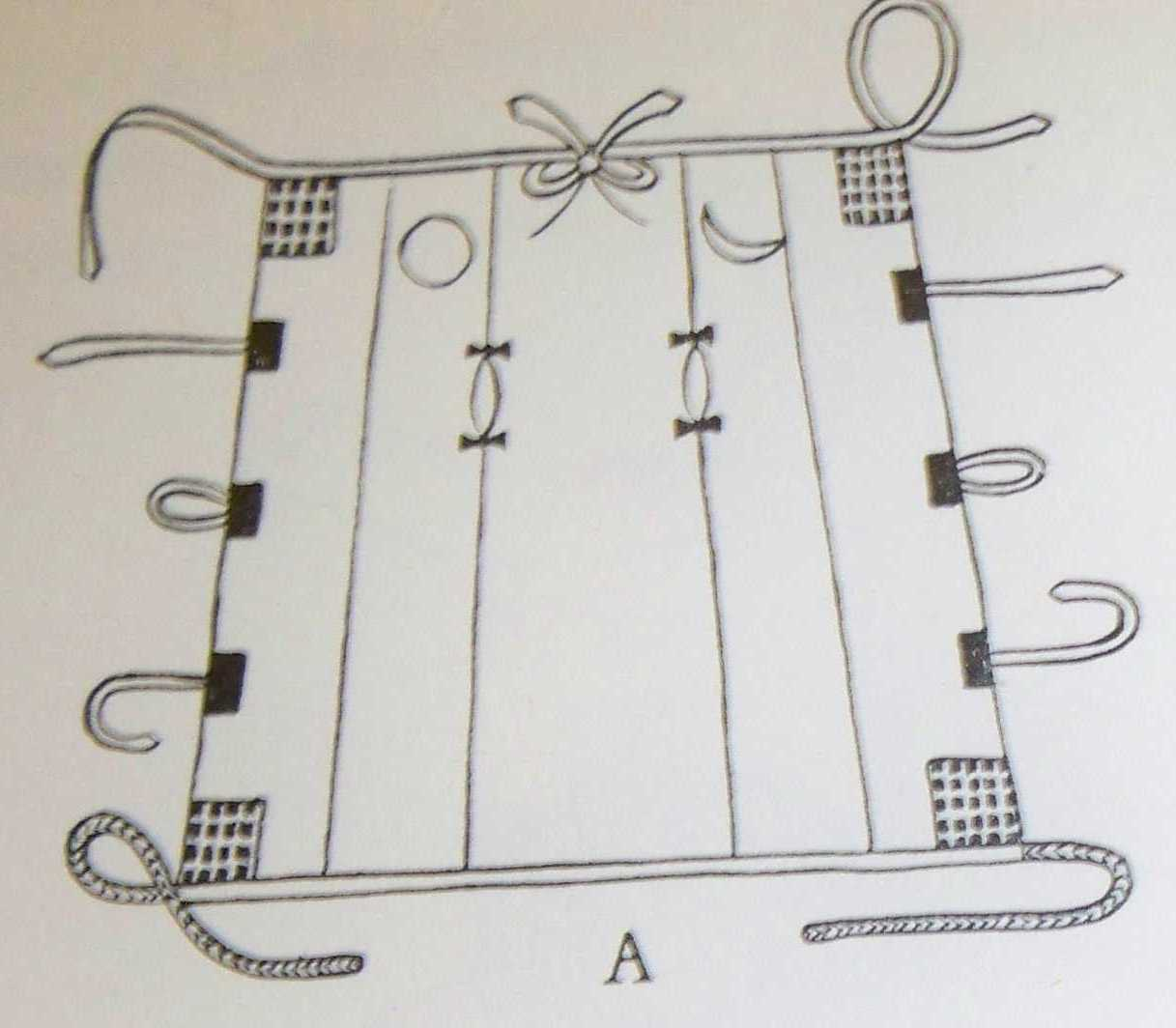
A horo, opened up flat

A horo (母衣) was a type of cloak or garment attached to the back of the armour worn by samurai on the battlefields of feudal Japan.

== Description ==
A horo was around 1.8 m (6 ft) long and made from several strips of cloth sewn together with a fringe on the top and bottom edges. The cloth strips were sewn together and formed into a sort of bag which would fill with air like a balloon when the wearer was riding a horse. A light framework of wicker, bamboo or whale bone known as an oikago, similar to a crinoline, which is said to have been invented by Hatakeyama Masanaga during the Ōnin War (1467–1477), was sometimes used to keep the horo expanded. Attaching the horo generally involved a combination of fastening cords and possibly a staff. The top cords were attached to either the helmet or cuirass of the wearer while the bottom cords were attached to the waist. The family emblem (mon) of the wearer was marked on the horo.

== Use ==
Horo were used as far back as the Kamakura period (1185–1333). When inflated the horo was said to protect the wearer from arrows shot from the side and from behind. This was tested in the Ancient Discoveries episode "Ancient Special Forces" (Episode 8 of Season 6) and found to be surprisingly effective at stopping arrows (shot from a period-appropriate Japanese bow) before they reached a target, or slowing them down considerably so that if they made it to the target they would not penetrate nearly as far as they would otherwise. In particular, arrows shot from such bows from behind that hit a billowing horo probably would not be able to penetrate the lacquered iron or leather armor of a samurai warrior riding on horseback when his horo was billowing out backwards. But this claim is only made for silk fabric with a diameter of some four to six feet that is billowing (as behind a rider on a horse going fast), not silk fabric that is not billowing or is lying flat against a surface.

Wearing a horo is also said to have marked the wearer as a messenger (tsukai-ban) or person of importance. According to the Hosokawa Yusai Oboegaki, the diary of Hosokawa Yusai (1534–1610) taking of an elite tsukai-ban messenger's head was a worthy prize. "When taking the head of a horo warrior, wrap it in the silk of the horo. In the case of an ordinary warrior, wrap it in the silk of the sashimono".
