= Evil Machines =

2011 book by Terry Jones

- First edition
- Author: Terry Jones
- Illustrator: Ryan Gillard and Keira Kinsella
- Language: English
- Genre: Fantasy literature
- Publisher: 2011 Unbound
- Publication place: England
- Pages: 248 (special edition)
- ISBN: 978-1-908717-01-6

Evil Machines is a 2011 book of fantasy stories written by Monty Python's Terry Jones. The book has a cover design and illustrations by Ryan Gillard and Keira Kinsella.

== Background ==
Evil Machines contains thirteen short stories about various devices that begin to show odd behavior. The stories generally feature a sting in the tail; for example, the UK city of Swindon is lampooned in "The Lift That Took People to Places They Didn't Want to Go". The concept for the stories came to Jones in a car. He said: "I was actually driving across London and I think I got held up by a red traffic light and suddenly the phrase, 'Evil machines', drifted across my mind and I thought, 'Well that's a good title and I could use that', so I went home and started writing the stories."

Evil Machines was the first book published by Unbound, a crowdfunding startup. According to Unbound's co-founder John Mitchinson, Jones chose the startup because he didn't think the book could be marketed easily as either children's or adult fiction. Jones received more than 1,000 pledges for Evil Machines, with an average pledge amount of £31.20.

The book's launch took place on Friday 4 November 2011 at the Adam Street Club, London, UK. At the launch Jones indicated that "The Nice Bomb" and "The Lift That Took People to Places They Didn't Want to Go" were probably the two stories of which he was most fond.

The stories were adapted for opera in Lisbon in 2008, with a libretto by Jones.

== Stories ==
- The Truthful Phone
- The Nice Bomb
- The Lift That Took People to Places They Didn't Want to Go
- Motorbike Thieves
- The Kidnap Car
- The Vacuum Cleaner That Was Too Powerful
- The Train to Anywhere
- The Rocket to Hell
- The Dog Maker and Other Wonders
- The Day Things Started to Go Wrong
- The Castle of Imagination
- The End of Life
- The Love Machine

== Critical reception ==
The Guardian gave the collection a mixed review, comparing Jones' prose style to Roald Dahl's but writing that "a surprising number of the jokes fall flat, considering Jones's talent as a comedian."
