= The Secret Life of Lego Bricks =

Non-fiction book about Lego

- Author: Daniel Konstanski
- Language: English
- Publisher: Unbound
- Publication date: September 14, 2024 (wide)
- Pages: 336
- ISBN: 9781800183506

The Secret Life of Lego Bricks: The Inside Story of a Design Icon is a non-fiction book written by Daniel Konstanski and published by Unbound in collaboration with The Lego Group. It was initially given a limited release in November 2022 following a crowdfunding program the year prior. The book received a wide release on September 14, 2024.

The book gives a detailed history covering Lego parts, moulds, and building techniques. The author was allowed access to behind-the-scenes material at Lego and interviewed their employees and designers while researching for it.

== Reception ==
Kirkus Reviews rated the book positively, stating "the text may stymie casual readers, but collectors, designers, and entrepreneurs will find loads of great information here." Publishers Weekly called it an "adoring love letter to the Danish toy brand."
