= Boom Bust Boom =

- Genre: Documentary
- Screenplay by: Terry Jones, Theo Kocken
- Directed by: Terry Jones, Bill Jones, Ben Timlett
- Narrated by: Terry Jones
- Country of origin: United Kingdom
- Original language: English

Production
- Running time: 70 minutes

Boom Bust Boom is a documentary about mankind's history of speculative bubbles. It was written, directed, and presented by former Monty Python member Terry Jones in his final film appearance before his death in 2020. It was released in 2016.
