= Nicobobinus =

1985 children's novel

- Author: Terry Jones
- Language: English
- Publication date: 1985

Nicobobinus is a 1985 children's novel written by Terry Jones and illustrated by Michael Foreman.

== Plot ==
Nicobobinus is a boy who can do anything. He lives a long time ago in Venice. His arm is turned to gold, which can only be cured with dragon's blood. He is pursued by pirates who threaten to chop it off.

== Adaptations ==
In 2014 it was adapted into a musical. On November 5, 2025, a feature film adaptation was announced by Genesius Pictures.
