= The Saga of Erik the Viking =

Book by Terry Jones

- First edition
- Author: Terry Jones
- Illustrator: Michael Foreman
- Language: English
- Genre: Children's literature
- Publisher: Pavilion Books
- Publication date: 1983
- Publication place: United Kingdom
- Pages: 144 pp
- ISBN: 0-907516-23-8
- OCLC: 60047974

The Saga of Erik the Viking is a children's novel written by the Welsh comedian Terry Jones, illustrated by Michael Foreman, and published by Pavilion in 1983. Foreman was commended for the annual Greenaway Medal by the Library Association, recognising the year's best-illustrated children's book by a British subject. (Note: Since 1995 there are usually eight books on the Greenaway shortlist. According to CCSU, some runners up through 2002 were Commended (from 1959) or Highly Commended (from 1974). There were 99 commendations of both kinds in 44 years including Foreman and two others in 1980, when no one was highly commended.)

According to one library record, "A Viking warrior who lived hundreds of years ago sets sail with his men on the Golden Dragon to find the land where the sun goes at night."

== Adaptations ==
The book was loosely adapted and directed by Jones as a 1989 film Erik the Viking. The film inspired a comic book adaptation by Graham Thompson.

An officially licensed computer adventure game with the same name was written by Level 9 Computing and released by Mosaic Publishing in 1984. It also featured a completely different plot.
