= Terry Jones' Medieval Lives =

- Genre: Documentary
- Written by: Terry Jones
- Directed by: Nigel Miller
- Presented by: Terry Jones
- Composer: David Mitcham
- Country of origin: United Kingdom
- Original language: English
- No. of seasons: 1
- No. of episodes: 8

Production
- Producers: Paul Bradshaw; Nigel Miller

Original release
- Network: BBC Two
- Release: 3 January – 24 January 2004

Related
- Terry Jones' Barbarians

Terry Jones' Medieval Lives is a 2004 television documentary series produced for the BBC. Written and hosted by Terry Jones, each half-hour episode examines a particular medieval personality, with the intent of separating myth from reality.

The episode The Peasant was nominated for Outstanding Writing for Nonfiction Programming at the 2004 Emmy Awards. Dr. Faye Getz acted as consultant for the series.

== Misunderstood history ==
Being a comedian as well as an historian, Jones takes an established belief, turns that around, and presents proof for his assertion. For example, peasants did not live in complete squalor and actually owned property. Also class divisions were not as severe as people think; there are cases of low-born people who rise to quite high positions.

In the episode on kings, he says, "History isn't necessarily what happened. It's often what people want us to think happened." He uses the following examples:

- Richard the Lionheart was actually a bad king, who only saw England (which he hated) as a means to finance his warmongering. Richard III did a lot of good for England. Modern perceptions of these kings are reversed because, Jones asserts, chroniclers of the time were commissioned to write what was politically most convenient.
- Louis, Count of Artois (later King of France), was acclaimed as King of England in 1216, yet appears in no history books (see First Baron's War) because of, Jones asserts, embarrassment over a "second French invasion".

Jones explained his motivation for making this series in the article in The Observer: "The main reason I wanted to make Medieval Lives was to get my own back on the Renaissance. It's not that the Renaissance has ever done me any harm personally, you understand. It's just that I'm sick of the way people's eyes light up when they start talking about the Renaissance. I'm sick of the way art critics tend to say: 'Aaaah! The Renaissance!' with that deeply self-satisfied air of someone who is at last getting down to the 'Real Thing'. And I'm sick to death of that ridiculous assumption that before the Renaissance human beings had no sense of individuality."

== Episode list ==
The eight episodes were as follows:

- The Peasant
- The Monk
- The Damsel
- The Minstrel
- The Knight
- The Philosopher (Alchemist)
- The Outlaw
- The King

== Companion book ==
- Jones, Terry & Alan Ereira (5 February 2004). Terry Jones' Medieval Lives. BBC Books (hardcover). ISBN 978-0-563-48793-7.
- Jones, Terry & Alan Ereira (5 May 2005). Terry Jones' Medieval Lives. BBC Books (paperback). ISBN 978-0-563-52275-1.
