= Caravaggio (2025 film) =

2025 British drama-documentary film

- Directed by: David Bickerstaff; Phil Grabsky
- Produced by: Amanda Wilikie
- Starring: Jack Bannell
- Music by: Simon Farmer
- Production company: Seventh Art Productions
- Release date: November 11, 2025
- Running time: 100 minutes
- Country: United Kingdom
- Language: English

Caravaggio is a 2025 British drama-documentary film directed by David Bickerstaff and Phil Grabsky and starring Jack Bannell. It was produced by Seventh Art Productions as part of the Exhibition on Screen series.

In 2026 the film was distributed in Italy by Kublai Film.

== Scenario ==
The film covers Caravaggio's life and work, in Rome, Naples, Malta, and Sicily. The story is told through comments by art historians, and dramatised episodes where Caravaggio reflects on his life direct-to-camera, breaking the fourth wall.

== Cast ==
- Jack Bannell as Caravaggio
- Helen Langdon – interviewee (art historian)
- Stephen Nelson – interviewee (artist)
- Fabio Scaletti – interviewee (art historian)
- Letizia Treves – interviewee (Head of Research & Expertise, Old Masters, Christie's)

== Reception ==
Andrew Pulver in The Guardian gave the film 3/5 stars, writing: "The latest offering from the estimable Exhibition on Screen strand takes on one of the biggies – and with a title like that, it is also perhaps treading on other hallowed ground: that of Derek Jarman, whose 1986 biopic is arguably the most brilliant rendering of the great painter's life and death. By contrast, this Caravaggio is a much more orthodox art-documentary treatment of its subject, playing to the strengths that the EoS films have built up over the years: beautifully crisp and detailed closeups of the work, well-informed and articulate talking-heads, and a nicely judged overall approach that is intelligent but not indigestible. ... The main issue is how well the film makes sense of its subject's life and work, and this Caravaggio is well up to scratch; it's tough, of course, to probe every corner of such a titan's output, but there's interesting material here on the step-by-step progression of Caravaggio's early career, as well as his seemingly committed Christian faith."

In The Times, Rachel Campbell-Johnson wrote: "The actor Jack Bannell who plays Caravaggio in the film – bulging-eyed, tousle-haired and with a scar swiping raw across his face – is well cast. But given that most of what we know about the thuggish Caravaggio comes from court records, the words that he speaks, standing aboard a Rome-bound felucca on the eve of his death, have been fabricated. And they can come across as a bit hammy. The strength of the film lies ... less in the biography (although this is covered including the infamous row over a plate of artichokes) than in the close-up encounters it offers with the artwork. The camera pans slowly across painted surfaces, inviting the viewer to revel in the drama and linger on the details."

The Irish Independent wrote: "If you think there are better things to do on a Saturday night than watching the bio of a painter, with Carravaggio you get mystery, intrigue, beauty, passion and murder – it's all there. Five years in production, this is the most extensive film ever made about one of the greatest artists of all time. Featuring one masterpiece after the other and with testimony from the artist himself on the eve of his disappearance, the film reveals Caravaggio as never before."

Filmhounds gave the film 4/5 stars, writing: "Caravaggio isn't just an excellent primer on this important artist's work. While it highlights the approach to light and action that would influence baroque painting as much as modern filmmakers like Martin Scorsese, it also makes well-thought-out decisions to capture the man like never before. Perhaps, much like Caravaggio's dark and often difficult painting, it's best summed up as a multifaceted quest for the truth."
