= Terry Jones' Great Map Mystery =

- Genre: Documentary
- Written by: Alan Ereira
- Directed by: Alan Ereira
- Presented by: Terry Jones
- Composer: Shabbey Road
- Country of origin: United Kingdom
- Original language: English
- No. of series: 1
- No. of episodes: 4

Production
- Running time: 30 minutes

Original release
- Network: BBC Two Wales
- Release: 13 May – 3 June 2008

Terry Jones' Great Map Mystery is a four-part television documentary series first broadcast on BBC Two Wales in 2008 and presented by former Monty Python member Terry Jones. As described on the BBC's website, "Terry Jones sets out on a series of journeys through Wales following the world's first road atlas: John Ogilby's Britannia, published in 1675."

In the series, Jones argues that Britannia was secretly designed to serve as a carefully coded blueprint for a French invasion of Britain that had the knowledge and covert support of Charles II.

== Episodes ==
=== 1. "The Road to Aberystwyth" ===
First broadcast 13 May 2008.

BBC's episode description: "Terry travels the road from the English border to Aberystwyth and begins to suspect there is more to Ogilby's atlas than meets the eye."

=== 2. "The Road to St David's" ===
First broadcast 20 May 2008.

BBC's episode description: "On the way to St David's, Terry discovers that this was never a road at all. The mystery deepens as dark forces behind the making of the map are revealed."

=== 3. "St David's to Holywell" ===
First broadcast 27 May 2008

BBC's episode description: "Following an ancient pilgrim route, Terry discovers that the map contains a dangerous secret, with a trail of intrigue leading all the way back to the throne of England and King Charles II."

=== 4. "Chester to Holyhead" ===
First broadcast 3 June 2008

BBC's episode description: "The final leg of Terry Jones' journey following a 17th Century road atlas is the most hazardous of all. Terry becomes the first person to follow this route successfully for 180 years. At the end of his journey, he finally uncovers the deadly political plot which was the real purpose of the map."
