= Patent Bending =

Canadian reality television series

- Genre: Reality
- Created by: Brad Brough
- Starring: Tom Stewart; Russell Zeid; Rick Minke
- Narrated by: John Woodlock
- Country of origin: Canada
- Original language: English
- No. of seasons: 1
- No. of episodes: 14

Production
- Executive producer: Brad Brough
- Camera setup: Multi-camera
- Running time: approx. 22 minutes

Original release
- Network: Discovery Channel
- Release: August 22 – November 21, 2006

Patent Bending is a Canadian reality television series that premiered August 22, 2006, on the Discovery Channel. The series is based on building some of the weird, fantastical ideas inventors have patented over the last century. Once physically realised, the flaws in these ideas tend to be humorously obvious and explain the ideas' lack of commercial success. The team then tries to come up with an improved version, thus the "bending" part of the title, meeting with varying results.

== Episodes ==
| No. | Title | Original release date |
|---|---|---|
| 1 | "Bicycle Lawnmower" | August 22, 2006 |
| 2 | "Floating Tent" | August 29, 2006 |
| 3 | "Twelve Gauge Golfclub" | September 5, 2006 |
| 4 | "Helmet Bar" | September 12, 2006 |
| 5 | "Chute 'N Shoes" | September 19, 2006 |
| 6 | "Human Carwash" | September 26, 2006 |
| 7 | "Fishing Show" | October 3, 2006 |
| 8 | "Motorized Picnic Table" | October 10, 2006 |
| 9 | "The Baby Shower" | October 17, 2006 |
| 10 | "The Better Mousetrap" | October 24, 2006 |
| 11 | "Man Catcher" | October 31, 2006 |
| 12 | "Super Shopping Cart" | November 7, 2006 |
| 13 | "Aqua Motorcycle" | November 14, 2006 |
| 14 | "The Good, the Bad, and the Useless" | November 21, 2006 |

== See also ==
- MythBusters
- Prototype This!
- The Re-Inventors
- Smash Lab
- Doing DaVinci
- James May's Man Lab
