= The Story of 1 =

- Genre: Documentary
- Directed by: Nick Murphy
- Narrated by: Terry Jones
- Country of origin: United Kingdom
- Original language: English

Production
- Running time: 60 minutes

Original release
- Network: BBC
- Release: 2005

The Story of 1 is a BBC documentary about the history of numbers, and in particular, the number 1. It was presented by former Monty Python member Terry Jones. It was released in 2005.

== Synopsis ==
Terry Jones first journeys to Africa, where bones have been discovered with notches in them. However, there is no way of knowing if they were used for counting.

Jones then discusses the Ishango bone, which must have been used for counting, because there are 60 scratches on each side of the bone. Jones declares this "the birth of one"; a defining moment in history of mathematics.

He then journeys to Sumer. Shortly after farming had been invented and humans were starting to build houses, they started to represent 1 with a token. With this, it was possible for the first time in history to do arithmetic. The Sumerians would enclose a certain number of tokens in a clay envelope and imprint the number of tokens on the outside. However, it was realized that one could simply write the number on a clay tablet.

To explore why the development of numbers occurred there and not some other place, Jones travels to Australia and meets a tribe called the Warlpiri. In their language, there are no words for numbers. When an individual is asked how many grandchildren he has, he simply replies he has "many", while he in fact has four.

In Egypt, the numeral system provides a fascinating glimpse of Egyptian society, as larger numbers seem more applicable to higher strata of society. It went something like this: One was a line, ten was a rope, a hundred a coil of rope (three symbols for smaller numbers, probably applicable to the average Egyptian), a thousand a lotus (a symbol of pleasure), ten thousand was a commanding finger, and a million – a number the Sumerians would never have dreamed of – was the symbol of a prisoner begging for forgiveness.

The Egyptians had a standard unit, the cubit, which was instrumental for building wonders such as the pyramids.

Jones then journeys to Greece to cover the time of Pythagoras. Jones discusses with mathematician Marcus du Sautoy Pythagoras' obsession with numbers, his secret society, his dedication to numbers, the Pythagorean theorem, and his flawed belief that all things could be measured in units (brought down by the attempt to measure the hypotenuse of an isosceles right triangle, in units relative to the two legs).

Archimedes was also in love with numbers. He tried to see what would happen if one took a sphere and turned it into a cylinder. This concept would later be applied to map making. Archimedes lived in Syracuse which at the time was at war with Rome. Archimedes was killed by a Roman soldier while working on a mathematical problem. The Romans were not interested in mathematics for its own sake, and as a result mathematics declined. The Roman numeral system was clumsy and inefficient. One reason that Terry Jones theorizes might be was that the numerals that the Romans used were basically the old-fashioned lines of the Ishango bone.

Jones discusses India's invention of a more efficient numeral system, including the invention of the concept of zero. He explains how the concept traveled west to the Caliphate. Then it arrived in Italy where it met fierce resistance. The reason for this was that most people were familiar only with the Roman numerals and not the superior Indian numerals. Eventually, the Hindu-Arabic numerals displaced the Roman ones.

Jones discusses finally how Gottfried Leibniz invented the binary system, which is the foundation for modern digital computers. He planned on building a mechanical computer to use this system, but never followed through with the plan. Leibniz was convinced that 1 and 0 were the only numbers anyone really needed. In 1944, a computer called Colossus was used to crack enemy codes during World War II. Computers like Colossus evolved into modern computers, which are used for every type of number calculation.
