= Penrhos, Herefordshire =

Village in Herefordshire, England

Coordinates: 52.202453°N 3.003736°W

Penrhos
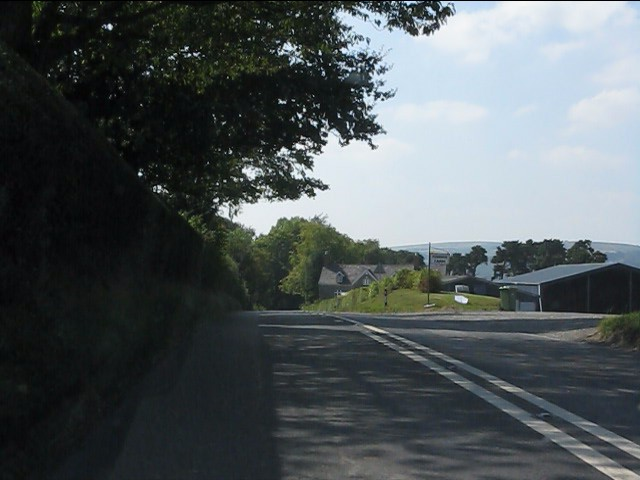
- A44 at Penrhos Farm

- Location within Herefordshire
- OS grid reference: SO315565
- Civil parish: Lyonshall
- Unitary authority: Herefordshire
- Ceremonial county: Herefordshire
- Region: West Midlands
- Country: England
- Sovereign state: United Kingdom
- Post town: KINGTON
- Postcode district: HR5
- Dialling code: 01544
- Police: West Mercia
- Fire: Hereford and Worcester
- Ambulance: West Midlands
- UK Parliament: North Herefordshire

Penrhos is an area east of Kington, Herefordshire near the Welsh border. In the area there are a small number of buildings including Penrhos Farm and Penrhos Court.

== Toponymy ==
The name is derived from the Welsh words pen and rhos and means "head (top) of the moor".

== History ==
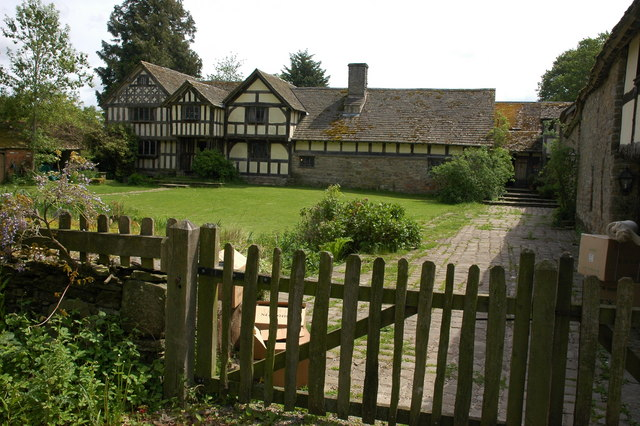
Penrhos Court

Penrhos Court originated around the late 13th century with a large cruck dwelling. Generations of owners have added more buildings and at one stage it became a small hamlet of half a dozen dwellings. Farm barns were added which formed a squared of ancient farm building surrounding a courtyard with a puddle duck pond and a well in the middle. Records of 1752 refer to the area as Penrose, in 1841 as Penrhose, in 1850 again as Penrose being a farm of 213 acres (0.86 km^{2}), then 1880 as the first reference to the Welsh name of Penrhos which it is still now known by.

== Notable people ==
Many famous people have stayed at Penrhos Court including Queen, Led Zeppelin, Mike Oldfield and Terry Jones of Monty Python.

Queen stayed there for a couple of weeks in August 1975 to rehearse their album A Night at the Opera (which features the hit "You're My Best Friend" and the legendary "Bohemian Rhapsody") before embarking to Rockfield Studios in Monmouth.
