= Terry Jones' Barbarians =

- Genre: Documentary
- Written by: Terry Jones; Alan Ereira; David McNab
- Presented by: Terry Jones
- Composer: Sandy Nuttgens
- Country of origin: United Kingdom
- Original language: English
- No. of seasons: 1
- No. of episodes: 4

Production
- Producer: David McNab

Original release
- Network: BBC Two
- Release: 26 May – 16 June 2006

Related
- Terry Jones' Medieval Lives

Terry Jones' Barbarians is a 4-part TV documentary series first broadcast on BBC 2 in 2006. It was written and presented by Terry Jones, and it challenges the received Roman and Roman Catholic notion of the barbarian.

Professor Barry Cunliffe of the University of Oxford acted as consultant for the series.

== Episodes ==
=== "The Primitive Celts" ===
First broadcast 26 May 2006, this episode challenges the popular view of Celtic society as a primitive culture that was uncivilised. Compared to Rome, it was actually an advanced society and, in some ways, even more advanced than Rome. For example, many of the roads in Gaul that were assumed to have been built by the Romans were actually built by the Celts themselves. However, Gaul was rich and tempting to Rome. The Roman general, Julius Caesar, set out to conquer Gaul with a professional army. The Celts stood no chance against Caesar and the Romans.

=== "The Savage Goths" ===
First broadcast 2 June 2006, it discusses Arminius, Trajan's Dacian Wars and Alaric I's sack of Rome.

=== "The Brainy Barbarians" ===
First broadcast 9 June 2006, it shows how Ancient Greeks and Persians were far from the Romans' view of them as effeminate and addicted to luxury. The Greeks valued science and mathematics, and the Persians had initially allowed multiculturalism among the different ethnic groups of its empire (until years of war with Rome).

=== "The End of the World" ===
First broadcast 16 June 2006, this episode discusses two barbarian babies born in 400 AD. One would grow up to become the most feared of all, Attila the Hun. The other, Geiseric, led the Vandals whom history has cast as destroyers. It is claimed that Roman civilization ended not by the invasion of these tribes but by the loss of the African tax base. The common view of Rome and barbarians was a result of the Roman Catholic Church popularizing the Roman version of the truth.

== Companion book ==
- Jones, Terry & Alan Ereira (1 June 2006). Terry Jones' Barbarians. BBC Books (hardcover). ISBN 978-0-563-49318-1.
- Jones, Terry & Alan Ereira (7 June 2007). Terry Jones' Barbarians. BBC Books (paperback). ISBN 978-0-563-53916-2.
