= Ancient Discoveries =

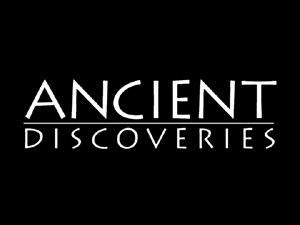
- Developed by: Wild Dream Films
- Narrated by: Phil Crowley
- Country of origin: United Kingdom
- Original language: English
- No. of series: 6
- No. of episodes: 42

Production
- Running time: 42 minutes

Original release
- Network: History
- Release: December 21, 2003 – December 28, 2009

Ancient Discoveries is a television series that premiered on December 21, 2003, on the History Channel. The program focused on ancient technologies. The show's theme was that many inventions which are thought to be modern have ancient roots or in some cases may have been lost and then reinvented. The program was a follow-up to a special originally broadcast in 2005 which focused on technologies from the Ancient Roman era such as the Antikythera mechanism and inventors such as Heron of Alexandria. Episodes of the regular series expanded to cover other areas such as Egypt, China and East Asia, and the Islamic world.

Ancient Discoveries was made for The History Channel by Wild Dream Films based in Cardiff in the UK. Much of the filming was on location across the world. The series used contributions from archaeologists and other experts, footage of historical sites and artifacts, computer generated reconstructions, and dramatized reconstructions along with experiments and tests on reconstructed artifacts.

== Episodes ==
=== Series 1 (2003) ===
Michael Carroll was the initial narrator of the series for The History Channel (US).

No	Title	Subject	Original airdate
1x01	Ancient Computer?	This episode investigates the Antikythera Mechanism, a computer-like device that may have been used to calculate the movements of stars and planets. It also highlights ancient inventors Archimedes and Ctesibius.	December 21, 2003
1x02	Galen, Doctor to the Gladiators	This episode discusses ancient medical devices and procedures, and profiles the Greek physician Galen, who practiced eye and brain surgery 2,000 years ahead of his time.	December 21, 2003
1x03	Heron of Alexandria	This episode discusses Heron of Alexandria, who created automatic doors and coin-operated machines.	December 21, 2003

=== Series 2 (2005) ===
Phil Crowley was narrator of this series of episodes and for all subsequent episodes for The History Channel (US).

No	Title	Subject	Original airdate
2x01	Ships	The lake Nemi ships, large Roman vessels that were salvaged from the lake in the 1930s and burned in 1944, are discussed, including technological discoveries from the ships.	August 21, 2005
2x02	Warfare	Warfare technology is examined, including the Helepolis, a square fortified tower on wheels; and "Greek Fire," an incendiary liquid that stuck to people and objects and couldn't be extinguished with water.	August 21, 2005
2x03	Machines II	Ancient mechanical devices are examined: A jar that appears to be an electric battery, a flour mill in France that is run by waterwheels, and Archimedes use of solar power to defeat the Romans.	December 11, 2005

=== Series 3 (2007) ===
This was the first series of episodes presented in wide screen format on The History Channel (US).

No	Title	Subject	Original airdate
3x01	Siege of Troy	This episode reconstructs the legend of the Trojan War in Turkey. Achilles' duel against Hector and the sailing of the vast Mycenaean fleet are discussed.	January 23, 2007
3x02	Cars & Planes	This episode examines transportation technology that existed in the ancient world. It discusses a Greek railway, Chinese wind-powered vehicles, and possibility of flying machines in Greece, Egypt and China.	January 30, 2007
3x03	Machines of the Gods	Examining Greek and Roman technology designed for use in religious temples to create illusions that seemed miraculous. Included: an iron chariot that appeared to be suspended in mid air at the Temple of Serapis in Alexandria.	February 6, 2007
3x04	Super Ships	Extraordinary sailing vessels are examined, including the Khufu funeral ship in Egypt made entirely without metal nails; and a warship that could hold 7000 crewmen.	February 13, 2007
3x05	Mega Machines	Examining ancient machines used in the large-scale engineering projects of the ancient world, particularly in Greece and Egypt. Included: machines used to transport 3-ton limestone coffins in Greece. Also: the building of the Parthenon.	February 20, 2007
3x06	Egyptian Warfare	Egyptian warfare and weaponry are examined, including revolutionary weapon-making techniques; and the grand scale of their battles.	February 27, 2007
3x07	Chinese Warfare	Exploring the military innovations of ancient China, including gunpowder, flame throwers, rockets, automated crossbows, siege machines, and the grand scale of their battles.	March 6, 2007
3x08	Machines III	Chinese technology such as cosmic machines, hydraulic hammers, water-controlled clocks and mass production plants powered by water.	March 27, 2007
3x09	Robots	An examination of ancient robotics includes a look at the automata of ancient China, the Hellenistic engineers Heron and Philon, the Kurdish engineer Al-Jazari, the Byzantine Empire, and Leonardo da Vinci. Also includes reconstructions of ancient inventions.	April 17, 2007
3x10	Machines of the East	Examining the inventions of Kurdish engineer Al-Jazari, who lived in what is now modern Iraq and Turkey in the 13th century. His designs include automated water-lifting mechanisms, water-based clocks, and a variety of geared mechanisms.	April 24, 2007

=== Series 4 (early 2008) ===
No	Title	Subject	Original airdate
4x01	Lost Cities of the Deep	Our modern day landscapes are littered with the remains of ancient superstructures. Now, cutting edge archaeology is beginning to reveal that this century's most exciting discoveries actually lie at the bottom of the ocean.	January 28, 2008
4x02	Ancient Super Navies	Experts investigate antiquity's legendary naval inventions, including high-explosive grenades, covert underwater attack equipment and biological warfare.	February 4, 2008
4x03	Ancient Super Ballistics	Modern forensic techniques help firearms experts reveal the accuracy, power and range of ancient bullets, rockets and bombs.	February 11, 2008
4x04	Ancient Death Machines	Many of today's lethal military weapons owe their origins to inventors of the ancient world who created siege machines, land mines, flamethrowers and more.	February 25, 2008
4x05	Ancient Chinese Super Ships	China's master shipbuilders create some of the most powerful warships and greatest fleets of the ancient world.	March 3, 2008
4x06	Ancient New York	New discoveries unveil the ancient blueprint for modern life in the metropolis of New York.	March 10, 2008

=== Series 5 (late 2008) ===
No	Title	Subject	Original airdate
5x01	Death Weapons of the East	Comparison test between a shotgun and a staff, the oldest known weapon; the deadly Chinese ermei underwater attack weapon; examining whether Chi warriors can really kill a man with a single touch; ancient Chinese crossbows.	October 23, 2008
5x02	Impossible Naval Engineering	Citizens of ancient Tyre use fire ships against Alexander the Great's besieging fleet; Roman Emperor Nero builds a death yacht to kill his own mother; a 15th-century weapon designed to pierce enemy hulls; ancient paddle-wheel boat.	October 30, 2008
5x03	Ancient Tank Tech	Asian battle elephants and Europe's medieval knights in armor demonstrate people in the past understood the modern tank's principles combining protection, speed and firepower; ancient antitank weapon.	November 6, 2008
5x04	Ancient Torture Tech	Revealing the terrifying truth behind torture; ancient inventors go to great lengths to develop precision devices to exact pain; the rack; burning at the stake; Vlad the Impaler.	November 13, 2008
5x05	Ancient Mining Machines	Unique technologies of ancient miners, including a Roman hydraulic system, sappers who could undermine castle walls and the 1689 origination of gunpowder mining in England.	November 20, 2008
5x06	Impossible Army Machines	The amazing successes and stunning failures of ancient military engineers influence today's weapons and tactics; an ancient Greek weapon is still used on aircraft carriers; rapid-firing Chinese catapult; Hannibal crosses the Alps.	December 1, 2008
5x07	Lost Science of the Bible	Investigating Bible stories to find if they have basis in scientific fact; determining Goliath's size and considering the technology of the sling David used to fell him; Tower of Babel; levitating a replica of the Ark of the Covenant.	December 15, 2008

=== Series 6 (2009) ===
No	Title	Subject	Original airdate
6x01	Airborne Assault	Assault from the air didn't begin with the era of the airplane. The kite bomb was a medieval siege weapon that dropped bombs from a kite over cities. Ancient bouncing bombs that actually skipped across water terrorized shipping in Turkey in 1453. Ancient China's whistling arrows, the world's earliest rocket-powered explosive missile, and the earliest known successful parachute, are also examined.	November 5, 2009
6x02	Guns n' Ammo	This episode examines many strange and early prototypes of the modern gun. These include a simple bamboo tube that could have been the world's first gun, a secret recipe for ancient tracer fire, a mega-mortar named "Roaring Meg", and a nine-barreled medieval volley gun. The truth behind the bizarre battlefield phenomena of "wind of the cannonball" is also explored.	November 12, 2009
6x03	Ancient Mega-Fort	This episode explores the defenses of ancient forts and cities. Discover the invisible underground defensive systems of Cappadocia and how they proved so successful. Test the ancient Mayan killer bee castle defenses, and release bees in an attack. A replica section of the ancient Roman fort of Alesia is built. And the most impregnable walls in history — the multi-layered defenses of Constantinople are investigated and the type of cannon that destroyed them 1453.	December 4, 2009
6x04	Ancient Secret Agents	The systems by which ancient intelligence services transmitted messages over thousands of miles is investigated. Methods by which ancient spies sent secret messages are reviewed such as invisible ink made of human sperm and how they wrote on the inside of a raw egg. Discover how the ninja used explosives, not just darts and poisons. How a Roman James Bond used a suit made of cork to support him in full armor across a river is also explored.	December 10, 2009
6x05	Gruesome Medicine	Explores ancient medical techniques and possible new applications in the modern era. Techniques reviewed include bloodletting by leeches, reading from a torpedo fish, trepanning to relieve pressure on the brain, and Roman battlefield surgery and tools. Other items reviewed include how snake venom was used as medicine and using replica tools and virtual surgery in a computer to see how an arrow was removed from the skull of Prince Henry V of England.	December 18, 2009
6x06	Riots and Revolution	The show tracks down the secret manual that explained how the Vietnamese defeated not only the US in the 20th century, but the Mongols 700 years earlier. It reveals the largest booby trap in history, one that snagged an entire battle fleet, how king Mithridates used a substance called burning mud in his revolt against Rome, and how the terrorist booby-traps and letter bombs of today were invented hundreds of years ago.	December 18, 2009
6x07	Ancient Commandos	Ancient commandos fought deep behind enemy lines in some of the harshest terrains known to man. The show examines such exploits through storms and snowdrifts, revealing the tech and truth behind the world earliest known ski commandos. A journey to the deserts of Egypt reveals how a tiny army beat off a major invasion force using deception and a bunch of farm animals. The Bayeux tapestry is featured as well as one of the ancient worlds most feared and successful commando units, the Naftin.	December 18, 2009
6x08	Ancient Special Forces	The show reviews ancient Roman navy SEAL techniques of capturing enemy ships from underwater and replicates the feat. The tactics of ancient Roman war dog units are explored including a historically savage breed of dog, the Mastiff. Finally, the secrets of the samurai sword and how it was made is reviewed and they build and test an ancient Horo, a Japanese device that could protect a galloping cavalryman from arrow fire using thin silk.	December 18, 2009
6x09	Twisted Weapons of the East	The show travels first to India where they encounter martial artists wielding terrifying 6-foot-long (1.8 m) swords, a projectile that can sever the limbs of any enemies, and an ancient Indian booby trap which impales its victims as they sleep. In Egypt, how camels were turned into weapons of war are explored. Finally, through painstaking research, they construct the world's first unmanned weapon that went onto the battlefield over 2000 years ago.	December 18, 2009
6x10	Ancient Record Breakers	This episode explores some ancient world records that still stand today. The most valuable thing in the ancient world is still the most valuable thing today at 2000 dollars per gram. A replica of a 2000-year-old jet engine is built and a weapons team finally reveals the only weapon in history that can shoot around corners. They review what was the fastest thing in the ancient world and explosives experts reveal that the first gun was made of fruit.	December 22, 2009
6x11	Mega Ocean Conquest	The show reveals how an ancient destroyer rammed its way to victory in one of the most significant sea battles. In Denmark, a team of divers build and test the world's first ever deep sea diving suit, designed in the 15th century. CSI science helps unravel the mystery of an unknown ship found off the coast of Britain. And in a sea cannon experiment, naval experts explore how a 16th-century war fleet blasted their way to victory against the Spanish armada.	December 22, 2009
6x12	Rituals of Death	Travel to Egypt to discover the mysteries of the mummified crocodiles of Kom Ombo. We will x-ray an ancient mummy that has held a secret for 2000 years, and reveal the lengths that people will go to ritualize death. New discoveries at the site of the world-famous terracotta army in China reveal incredible insights into the mind-state of the great first emperor of China and his people; and what they believed about death. In Britain, forensic scientists solve a year old murder using 15th century forensic science, as well as hundreds of mini-detectives—blowflies. And using virtual reality techniques doctors will now look inside the body of a victim during a live crucifixion to discover horrific new truths about the suffering on the cross.	December 22, 2009
6x13	Secret Science of the Occult	In Mexico, explorers use a sacred ancient Mayan temple code to search for an occult underworld engineered in the depths of the earth—a mysterious site where no TV cameras have ever ventured. In Britain, investigators uncover the secret technologies behind a life size statue of Jesus Christ that miraculously came to life. Weapons experts reveal the science that saved a holy military order from certain annihilation in the bloodiest siege in history. In Greece, archaeologists solve the mystery of the oracle of the dead; an eerie sanctuary where flying ghosts appeared from the depths of hell.	December 28, 2009

An episode about ancient surgery is available through Comcast OnDemand, even though it has not aired on History.

== See also ==
- Ancient Inventions
- The Re-Inventors
