= Terry Jones =

Welsh actor, comedian, director, historian and writer (1942–2020)

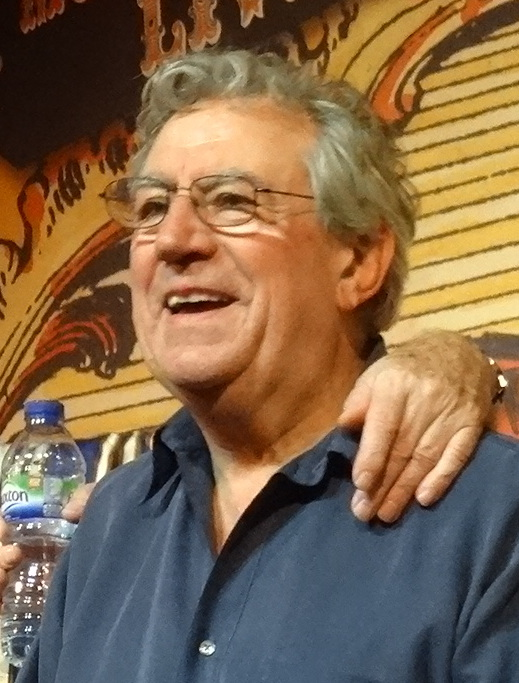
- Jones in 2014
- Born: Terence Graham Parry Jones; 1 February 1942; Colwyn Bay, Wales
- Died: 21 January 2020 (aged 77); London, England
- Education: St Edmund Hall, Oxford
- Occupations: Actor; comedian; director; historian; writer
- Years active: 1966–2016
- Known for: One of the six members of Monty Python
- Spouses: Alison Telfer (m. 1970; div. 2012) Anna Söderström (m. 2012)
- Children: 3

Terence Graham Parry Jones (1 February 1942 – 21 January 2020) was a Welsh actor, comedian, director, historian, writer and member of the Monty Python comedy troupe.

After graduating from Oxford University with a degree in English, Jones and writing partner Michael Palin wrote and performed for several high-profile British comedy programmes, including Do Not Adjust Your Set and The Frost Report, before creating Monty Python's Flying Circus with Cambridge graduates Graham Chapman, John Cleese and Eric Idle, and American animator-filmmaker Terry Gilliam. Jones was largely responsible for the programme's innovative, surreal structure, in which sketches flowed from one to the next without the use of punch lines. He made his directorial debut with Monty Python and the Holy Grail, which he co-directed with Gilliam, and also directed the subsequent Python films Life of Brian and The Meaning of Life. His other directorial credits include Personal Services and The Wind in the Willows.

Jones co-created and co-wrote with Palin the anthology series Ripping Yarns. He also wrote an early draft of Jim Henson's film Labyrinth and is credited with the screenplay. Jones was a well-respected medieval historian, having written or co-written several books and presented television documentaries about the period, as well as a prolific children's author. In 2016, Jones received a Lifetime Achievement award at the BAFTA Cymru Awards for his outstanding contribution to television and film. After living for several years with a degenerative aphasia, he gradually lost the ability to speak and died in 2020 from frontotemporal dementia.

== Early life ==
Jones was born on 1 February 1942 in the seaside town of Colwyn Bay, on the north coast of Wales, the son of housewife Dilys Louisa (Newnes), and Alick George Parry-Jones, a bank clerk. When he was born during World War II, his father was serving with the Royal Air Force in Scotland. A week after he was born, his father was posted in India as a Flight Lieutenant (Temporary). His brother Nigel was two years his senior. He reunited with his father when the war ended four years later; of their first meeting at Colwyn Bay railway station he recalled: "I'd only ever been kissed by the smooth lips of a lady up until that point, so his bristly moustache was quite disturbing!" When Jones was four and a half, the family moved to Claygate, Surrey, England.

Jones attended Esher COE primary school and the Royal Grammar School in Guildford, where he was school captain in the 1960–61 academic year. He read English at St Edmund Hall, Oxford, but "strayed into history". He became interested in the medieval period through reading Chaucer as part of his English degree. He graduated with a 2:1. While there, he performed comedy with future Monty Python castmate Michael Palin in the Oxford Revue. Jones was a year ahead of Palin at Oxford, and on first meeting him Palin states, "The first thing that struck me was what a nice bloke he was. He had no airs and graces. We had a similar idea of what humour could do and where it should go, mainly because we both liked characters; we both appreciated that comedy wasn't just jokes."

== Career history ==
=== Before Python and early Python ===
Jones appeared in Twice a Fortnight with Michael Palin, Graeme Garden, Bill Oddie and Jonathan Lynn, as well as the television series The Complete and Utter History of Britain (1969). He appeared in Do Not Adjust Your Set (1967–69) with Palin, Eric Idle and David Jason. He wrote for The Frost Report and several other David Frost programmes on British television. Of Jones' contributions as a performer to Monty Python's Flying Circus, his depictions of middle-aged women (or "ratbag old women" as termed by the BBC, also known as "pepper-pots" or "grannies from hell") are among the most memorable.

=== Directorial work ===
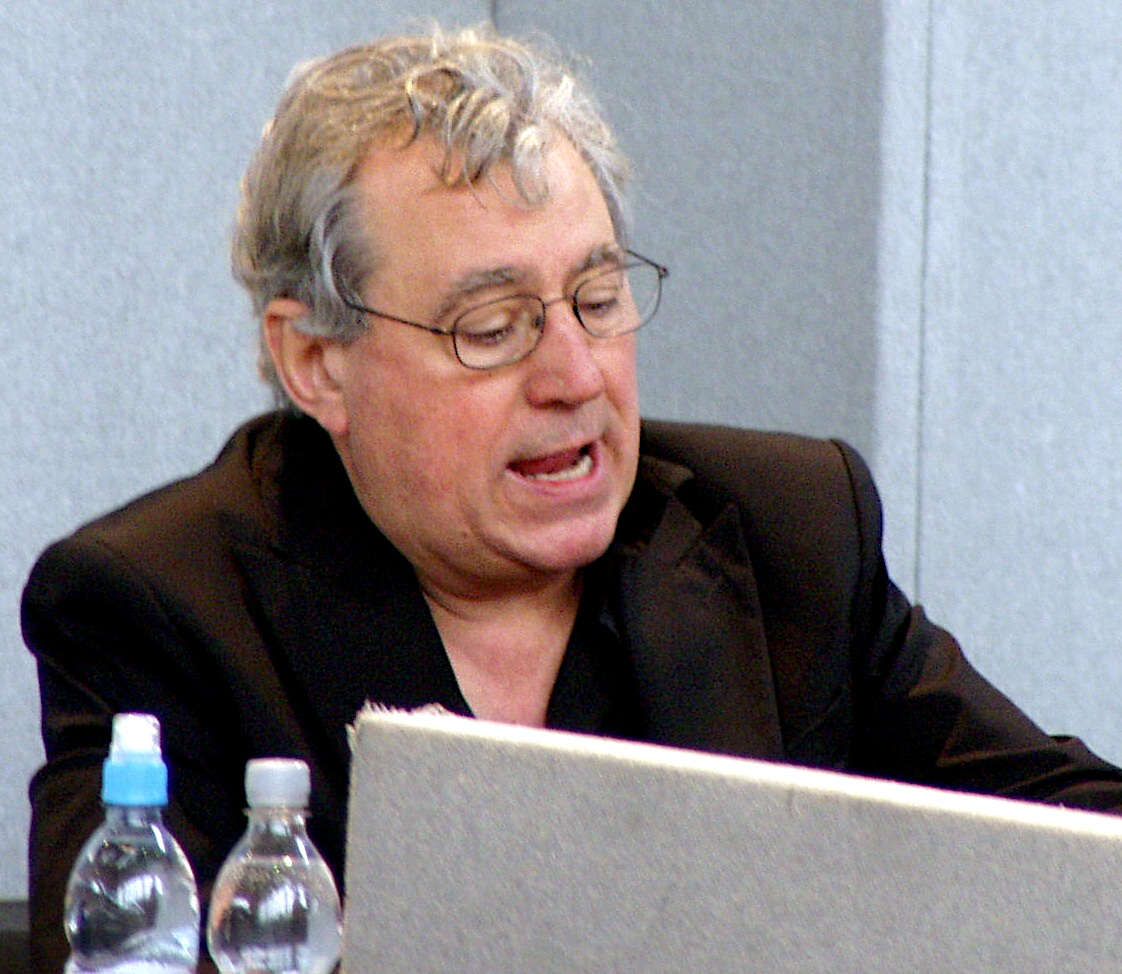
Jones in 2007

Jones co-directed Monty Python and the Holy Grail with Terry Gilliam, and was sole director on two further Monty Python movies, Life of Brian and Monty Python's The Meaning of Life. As a film director, Jones finally gained fuller control of the projects and devised a distinct, signature style that relied on visual comedy and surreal touches to complement the jokes. He would repeatedly abandon punchlines and create fragmented, non sequitur story arcs to bring out the deadpan humour. His later films include Erik the Viking (1989) and The Wind in the Willows (1996). In 2008, Jones wrote the libretto for and directed the opera Evil Machines. In 2011, he was commissioned to direct and write the libretto for another opera, entitled The Doctor's Tale.

Three of the films which Jones directed—The Meaning of Life, Monty Python's Life of Brian and Personal Services—were banned in Ireland.

Jones directed the 2015 comedy film Absolutely Anything, about a disillusioned schoolteacher who is given the chance to do anything he wishes by a group of aliens watching from space. The film features Simon Pegg, Kate Beckinsale, Robin Williams and the voices of the five remaining members of Monty Python. It was filmed in London during a six-week shoot.

In 2016, Jones directed Jeepers Creepers, a West End play about the life of comic Marty Feldman. It was his last directing work before his death.

=== Writer and brewer ===
Jones wrote many books and screenplays, including comic works and more serious writing on medieval history.

He also had an interest in real ale, and was a member of the Campaign for Real Ale. In 1977, alongside Peter Austin and Richard Boston, he co-founded the Penrhos Brewery, a microbrewery at Penrhos Court at Penrhos, Herefordshire, which ran until 1983. The former brewery has now become a pub called The Python's Arms.

==== Comedy ====
Jones co-wrote Ripping Yarns with Palin. They also wrote a play, Underwood's Finest Hour, which was staged at the Lyric Theatre, Hammersmith in 1981, about an obstetrician distracted during a birth by the radio broadcast of a Test match. Jones also wrote numerous works for children, including Fantastic Stories, The Beast with a Thousand Teeth and a collection of comic verse called The Curse of the Vampire's Socks.

Jones was the co-creator (with Gavin Scott) of the animated TV series Blazing Dragons (1996–1998), which parodied the Arthurian legends and Middle Ages periods. Reversing a common story convention, the series' protagonists are anthropomorphic dragons beset by evil humans.

==== Screenplays ====
Jones wrote the screenplay for Labyrinth (1986), although his draft went through several rewrites and several other writers before being filmed; consequently, much of the finished film was not actually written by Jones.

==== History ====
"[you] speak to him on subjects as diverse as fossil fuels, or Rupert Bear, or mercenaries in the Middle Ages or Modern China ... in a moment you will find yourself hopelessly out of your depth, floored by his knowledge."

— Python biographer George Perry on Jones

Jones wrote books and presented television documentaries on medieval and ancient history. His first book was Chaucer's Knight: The Portrait of a Medieval Mercenary (1980), which offers an alternative take on Geoffrey Chaucer's The Knight's Tale. Chaucer's knight is often interpreted as a paragon of Christian virtue, but Jones asserts that if one studies historical accounts of the battles the knight claims he was involved in, he can be interpreted as a typical mercenary and a potentially cold-blooded killer. He also co-wrote Who Murdered Chaucer? (2003) in which he argues that Chaucer was close to King Richard II, and that after Richard was deposed, Chaucer was persecuted to death by Thomas Arundel.

Jones' TV series also frequently challenged popular views of history. For example, in Terry Jones' Medieval Lives (2004; for which he received a 2004 Emmy nomination for "Outstanding Writing for Nonfiction Programming") he argues that the Middle Ages was a more sophisticated period than is popularly thought, and Terry Jones' Barbarians (2006) presents the cultural achievements of peoples conquered by the Roman Empire in a more positive light than Roman historians typically have, attributing the sack of Rome in AD 410 to propaganda.

==== Column writing ====
Jones wrote numerous columns for The Guardian, The Daily Telegraph and The Observer condemning the Iraq War. Many of these editorials were published in a paperback collection titled Terry Jones's War on the War on Terror.

In November 2011, his book Evil Machines was launched by the online publishing house Unbound at the Adam Street Club in London. It was the first book to be published by a crowdfunding website dedicated solely to books. Jones provided significant support to Unbound as they developed their publishing concept. In February 2018, Jones released The Tyrant and the Squire, also with Unbound.

==== Poetry ====
Jones was a member of the Poetry Society, and his poems have appeared in Poetry Review.

=== Work with musicians ===
Jones performed with the Carnival Band and appears on their 2007 CD Ringing the Changes.

In January 2008, the Teatro São Luiz, in Lisbon, Portugal, premiered Evil Machines—a musical play, written by Jones (based on his book), with original music by Portuguese composer Luis Tinoco. Jones was invited by the Teatro São Luiz to write and direct the play, after a successful run of Contos Fantásticos, a short play based on Jones' Fantastic Stories, also with music by Tinoco.

In January 2012 Jones announced that he was working with songwriter/producer Jim Steinman on a heavy metal version of The Nutcracker.

=== As performer ===
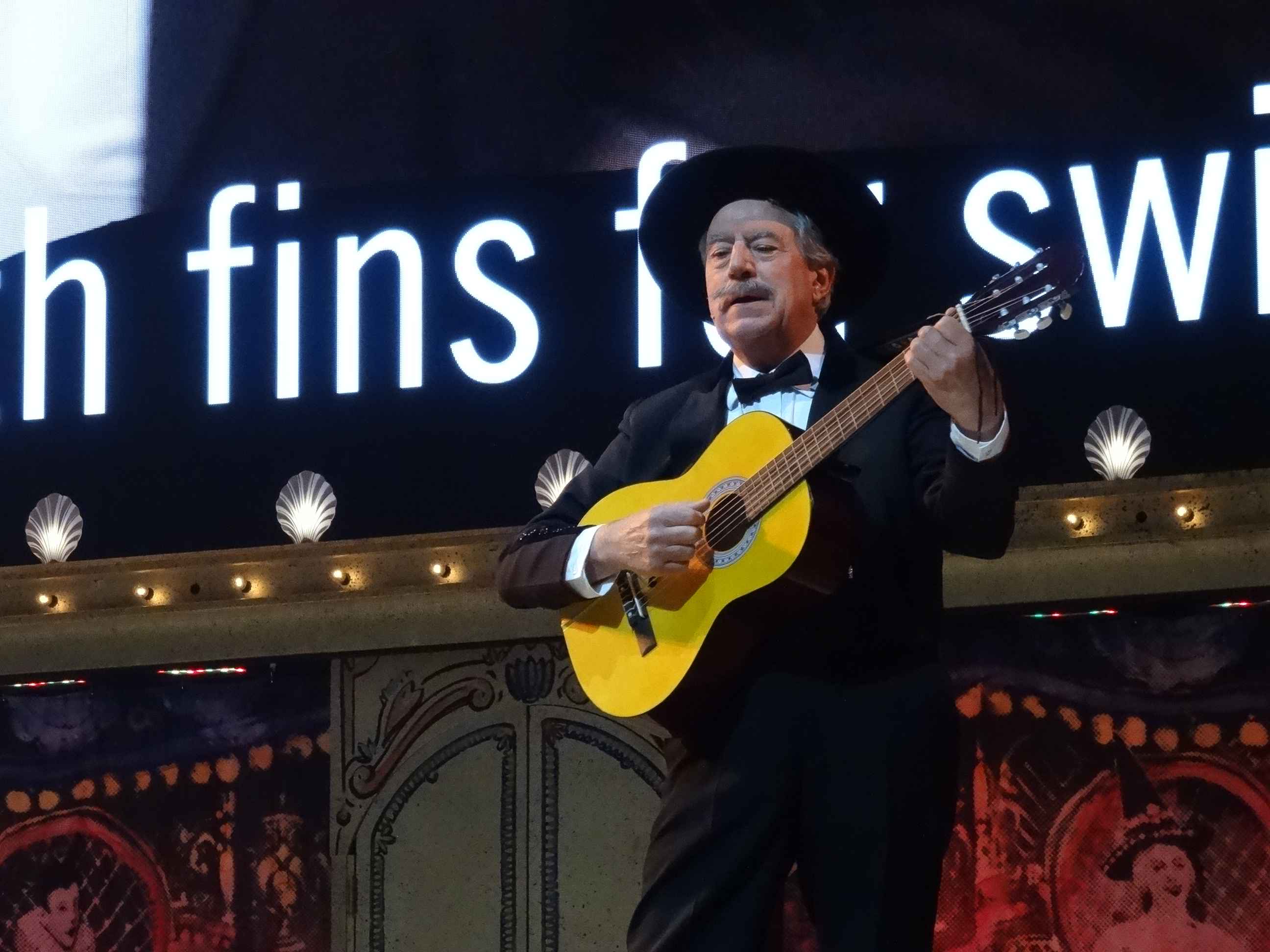
Jones performing in 2014

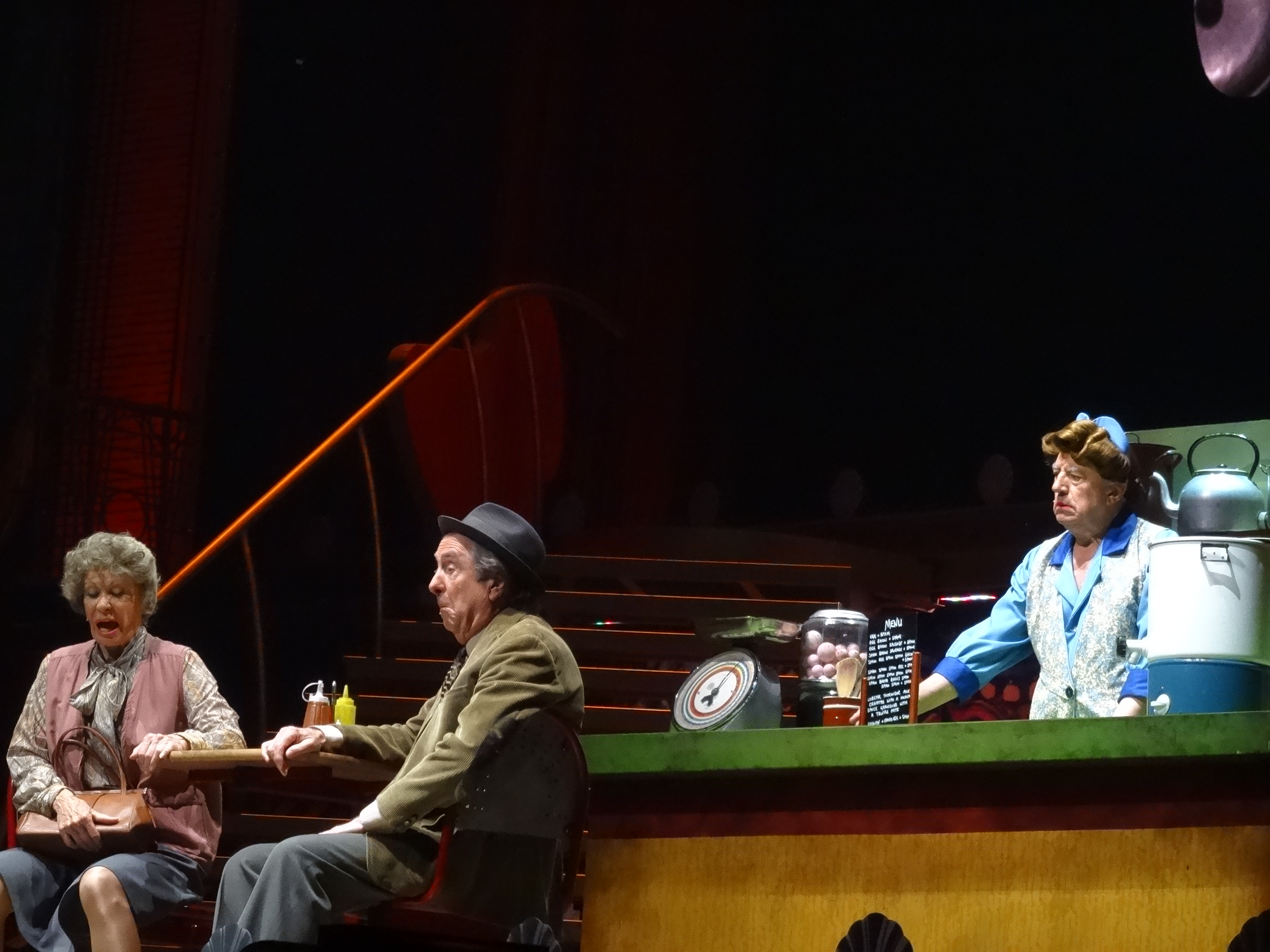
Jones (right) behind the counter during the "Spam sketch" at Monty Python Live (Mostly) in 2014. He plays a waitress who recites a menu in which nearly every dish contains Spam.

Apart from a cameo in Terry Gilliam's Jabberwocky and a minor role as a drunken vicar in the BBC sitcom The Young Ones, Jones rarely appeared in work outside his own projects. From 2009 to 2011, however, he provided narration for The Legend of Dick and Dom, a CBBC fantasy series set in the Middle Ages. He also appears in two French films by Albert Dupontel: Le Créateur (1999) and Enfermés dehors (2006).

In 2009, Jones took part in the BBC Wales programme Coming Home about his Welsh family history. In July 2014, Jones reunited with the other four living Pythons to perform at ten dates (Monty Python Live (Mostly)) at the O_{2} Arena in London. This was Jones' last performance with the group prior to his aphasia diagnosis.

In October 2016, Jones received a standing ovation at the BAFTA Cymru Awards when he received a Lifetime Achievement award for his outstanding contribution to television and film.

== Personal life ==
=== Marriages ===
Jones married Alison Telfer in 1970; they had two children, Sally in 1974 and Bill in 1976. They lived in Camberwell, London and had an open marriage. In 2009, Jones left Telfer for Anna Söderström; she was 41 years his junior and they had been in a relationship for five years. In September 2009, Söderström and Jones had a daughter, and in 2012 they married. The family settled in Highgate, North London.

=== Political views ===
In a 1984 interview, Jones stated "if I had any political convictions, I would say that I am an anarchist", stating that anarchism was a belief in government from the bottom up, rather than something imposed from above.

Jones published a number of articles on political and social commentary, principally in newspapers The Daily Telegraph, The Guardian, The Independent and The Observer. Many of these articles mocked the war on terror, belittling it as "declaring war on an abstract noun" and comparing it to attempting to "annihilate mockery".

In August 2014, Jones was one of 200 public figures who signed a letter to The Guardian expressing their hope that Scotland would vote to remain part of the United Kingdom in September's referendum on that issue.

=== Health and death ===
In October 2006, Jones was diagnosed with colon cancer and underwent surgery. After a course of chemotherapy, he was declared free of the disease. Later reminiscing about the event, he said, "Unfortunately, my illness is not nearly bad enough to sell many newspapers and the prognosis is even more disappointing."

In 2015, Jones was diagnosed with primary progressive aphasia, a form of frontotemporal dementia that impairs the ability to speak and communicate. He had first given cause for concern during the Monty Python reunion show Monty Python Live (Mostly) in July 2014 because of difficulties learning his lines. He became a campaigner for awareness of, and fundraiser for research into, dementia; he donated his brain for dementia research. By September 2016, he was no longer able to give interviews. By April 2017, he had lost the ability to say more than a few words of agreement.

On 21 January 2020, Jones died at his home in Highgate from complications of dementia just 11 days before his 78th birthday. His family and close friends remembered him with a humanist funeral ceremony at Golders Green Crematorium.

== Selected publications ==
=== Fiction ===
- Douglas Adams's Starship Titanic: A Novel (1997), ISBN 0-330-35446-9 – a novel based on the computer game of the same name by Douglas Adams
- Evil Machines (2011), ISBN 978-1-908717-01-6
- Trouble on the Heath (2011), ISBN 978-1-907726-20-0
- The Tyrant and the Squire (2018), ISBN 978-1783524624

Illustrated by Michael Foreman

- Fairy Tales (1981), ISBN 0-907516-03-3
- The Saga of Erik the Viking (1983), ISBN 0-907516-23-8 – Children's Book Award 1984
- Nicobobinus (1985), ISBN 1-85145-000-9
- The Curse of the Vampire's Socks and Other Doggerel (1988), ISBN 1-85145-233-8 – poetry
- Fantastic Stories (1992), ISBN 1-85145-957-X
- The Beast with a Thousand Teeth (1993), ISBN 1-85793-070-3
- A Fish of the World (1993), ISBN 1-85793-075-4
- The Sea Tiger (1994), ISBN 1-85793-085-1
- The Fly-by-Night (1994), ISBN 1-85793-090-8
- The Knight and the Squire (1997), ISBN 1-86205-044-9
- The Lady and the Squire (2000), ISBN 1-86205-417-7 – nominated for a Whitbread Award
- Bedtime Stories (2002), ISBN 1-86205-276-X – with Nanette Newman
- Animal Tales (2011), ISBN 978-1843651635

Illustrated by Brian Froud

- Goblins of the Labyrinth (1986), ISBN 1-85145-058-0
  - The Goblin Companion: A Field Guide to Goblins (1996), ISBN 1-85793-795-3 – an abridged re-release, in a smaller format, with the colour plates missing
- Lady Cottington's Pressed Fairy Book (1994), ISBN 1-85793-336-2
- Strange Stains and Mysterious Smells: Quentin Cottington's Journal of Faery Research (1996), ISBN 0-684-83206-2
- Lady Cottington's Pressed Fairy Journal (1998), ISBN 1-86205-024-4
- Lady Cottington's Fairy Album (2002), ISBN 1-86205-559-9

Illustrated by Martin Honeysett and Lolly Honeysett

- Bert Fegg's Nasty Book for Boys and Girls with Michael Palin (1974) ISBN 0-413-32740-X – expanded and revised editions of the book appeared as Dr. Fegg's Nasty Book of Knowledge in the US in 1976 and Dr. Fegg's Encyclopeadia [sic] of all World Knowledge, in the UK in 1984.

=== Non-fiction ===
- Chaucer's Knight: The Portrait of a Medieval Mercenary. Orion Publishing Group, Limited. 1980. ISBN 0-297-77566-9.; rev. ed. (1994), ISBN 0-413-69140-3
- Jones, Terry; Yeager, Robert F.; Doran, Terry; Fletcher, Alan; Dor, Juliette (2003). Who Murdered Chaucer?: A Medieval Mystery. Methuen. ISBN 0-413-75910-5.
- Terry Jones's War on the War on Terror. Nation Books. 2005. ISBN 1-56025-653-2.
- The Pythons Autobiography by The Pythons (with Graham Chapman (Estate), John Cleese, Terry Gilliam, Eric Idle, Michael Palin; edited by Bob McCabe). 2003. ISBN 9781409156789

With Alan Ereira

- Crusades. BBC Books. 1994. ISBN 0-563-37007-6.
- Terry Jones' Medieval Lives. 2004. ISBN 0-563-48793-3.
- Terry Jones' Barbarians. BBC Books. 2006. ISBN 0-563-49318-6.

== Filmography ==
=== Television ===
Title	Year	Credited as		Notes
Title	Year	Writer	Director	Notes
The Frost Report	1966–1967	Yes	No	
A Series of Bird's	1967	Yes	No	Additional material
Twice a Fortnight	1967	Yes	No	
Do Not Adjust Your Set	1967–1969	Yes	No	
Horne A'Plenty	1968	Yes	No	
Broaden Your Mind	1968	Yes	No	Additional material
The Complete and Utter History of Britain	1969	Yes	No	Also co-creator
Marty	1969	Yes	No	
Christmas Night with the Stars	1969, 1972	Yes	No	
Monty Python's Flying Circus	1969–1974	Yes	No	Also co-creator and performer
Frost on Sunday	1970	Yes	No	
Marty Amok	1970	Yes	No	TV special
The Two Ronnies	1971–1976	Yes	No	13 episodes
Monty Python's Fliegender Zirkus	1972	Yes	No	
Black and Blue	1973	Yes	No	Episode: "Secrets"
Ripping Yarns	1976–1979	Yes	No	Also co-creator
The Mermaid Frolics	1977	Yes	Yes	TV special
The Rupert Bear Story: A Tribute to Alfred Bestall	1982	No	Yes	TV documentary
Bombardemagnus	1985	Yes	No	2 episodes
The Young Indiana Jones Chronicles	1992	No	Yes	Episode: "Barcelona, May 1917"
Crusades	1995	Yes	No	4 episodes
Blazing Dragons	1996–1998	Yes	No	Co-creator and executive producer
Ancient Inventions	1998	Yes	No	3 episodes
The Hidden History of Egypt	2002	Yes	No	
The Hidden History of Rome	2002	Yes	No	
The Surprising History of Sex and Love	2002	Yes	No	
Terry Jones' Medieval Lives	2004	Yes	No	8 episodes
Terry Jones' Barbarians	2006	Yes	No	4 episodes
Kombat Opera Presents	2007	No	Yes	Episode: "The South Bragg Show"

==== Television acting roles ====
Title	Year	Role	Notes
Twice a Fortnight	1967	Various characters	
Do Not Adjust Your Set	1967–1969	Various characters	
Broaden Your Mind	1968	Various characters	
The Complete and Utter History of Britain	1969	Various characters	
Marty	1969	Various characters	
Christmas Night with the Stars	1969, 1972	Various characters	
Monty Python's Flying Circus	1969–1974	Various characters	
Monty Python's Fliegender Zirkus	1972	Various characters	
Ripping Yarns	1976–1979	Mr. Ellis / Bear / Mr. Moodie / Director	
The Mermaid Frolics	1977	Various characters	TV special
Saturday Night Live	1978	Orson Welles' director (voice)	Episode: "Michael Palin/Eugene Record"
Peter Cook & Co.	1980	Various characters	TV special
The Rupert Bear Story: A Tribute to Alfred Bestall	1982	Himself	TV documentary
The Young Ones	1984	Drunk Vicar	Episode: "Nasty"
The Young Indiana Jones Chronicles	1992	Marcello	Episode: "Barcelona, May 1917"
Jackanory	1993	Reader	2 episodes
Space Ghost Coast to Coast	1996	Himself	Episode: "Explode"
Monty Python Live at Aspen	1998	Himself	TV special
Boy in Darkness	2000	Storyteller	TV short film
The Adventures of Young Indiana Jones: Espionage Escapades	2001	Marcello	TV film (episode "Barcelona, May 1917" with new connecting segments)
Comedy Lab	2001, 2010	Knife (voice) / Handyman	2 episodes
Dinotopia	2002	Messenger Bird (voice)	
The Legend of Dick and Dom	2009–2011	Narrator	

==== Presenter ====
Title	Year	Notes
Crusades	1995	4 episodes
Ancient Inventions	1998	3 episodes
Gladiators: The Brutal Truth	2000	
The Hidden History of Egypt	2002	
The Hidden History of Rome	2002	
The Surprising History of Sex and Love	2002	
Terry Jones' Medieval Lives	2004	8 episodes
The Story of 1	2005	Documentary
Terry Jones' Barbarians	2006	4 episodes
Terry Jones' Great Map Mystery	2008	4 episodes
Perspectives	2015	Episode: "In Charlie Chaplin's Footsteps"

=== Film ===
Title	Year	Credited as		Notes
Title	Year	Writer	Director	Notes
And Now for Something Completely Different	1971	Yes	No	
Monty Python and the Holy Grail	1975	Yes	Yes	Co-directed with Terry Gilliam
Monty Python's Life of Brian	1979	Yes	Yes	
The Box	1981	Yes	No	Short film
Monty Python Live at the Hollywood Bowl	1982	Yes	No	Concert film
Monty Python's The Meaning of Life	1983	Yes	Yes	
Labyrinth	1986	Yes	No	
Personal Services	1987	No	Yes	
Erik the Viking	1989	Yes	Yes	
The Wind in the Willows	1996	Yes	Yes	
Monty Python Live (Mostly)	2014	Yes	No	
Absolutely Anything	2015	Yes	Yes	
Boom Bust Boom	2015	Yes	Yes	Documentary

==== Film acting roles ====
Title	Year	Role	Notes
And Now for Something Completely Different	1971	Various characters	
Monty Python and the Holy Grail	1975	Sir Bedevere the Wise / Various	
Jabberwocky	1977	Poacher	
Monty Python's Life of Brian	1979	Various characters	
The Box	1981	Harrington (voice)	Short film
Monty Python Live at the Hollywood Bowl	1982	Various characters	Concert film
The Crimson Permanent Assurance	1983	Very Big Corporation of America Clerk	Uncredited
Monty Python's The Meaning of Life	1983	Various characters	
Erik the Viking	1989	King Arnulf	
L.A. Story	1991	Sara's Mother (voice)	Uncredited
The Wind in the Willows	1996	Mr. Toad	
Asterix & Obelix Take On Caesar	1999	Obelix (voice)	English version
The Creator	1999	God	
Help! I'm a Fish	2000	Professor MacKrill (voice)	English version
Locked Out	2006	Homeless person	
Anna and the Moods	2007	Narrator (voice)	Short film
King Guillaume	2009	Oxford Professor	
Not the Messiah (He's a Very Naughty Boy)	2010	Workingman / Mexican / Mountie	
A Liar's Autobiography: The Untrue Story of Monty Python's Graham Chapman	2012	Graham's mother / Various voices	
Monty Python Live (Mostly)	2014	Various characters	
Absolutely Anything	2015	Scientist Alien (voice) / Van Driver	
Boom Bust Boom	2015	Presenter	Documentary
The Land of Sometimes	2026	The Wish Watch (voice)	posthumous release

== Documentary series ==
- The Rupert Bear Story: A Tribute to Alfred Bestall (1982)
- Crusades (1995)
- Ancient Inventions – directed by Phil Grabsky and Daniel Percival (1998)
- Gladiators: The Brutal Truth (2000)
- The Surprising History of Egypt (USA, 2002) a.k.a. The Hidden History of Egypt (UK, 2003) – directed by Phil Grabsky
- The Surprising History of Rome (USA, 2002) a.k.a. The Hidden History of Rome (UK, 2003) – directed by Phil Grabsky
- The Surprising History of Sex and Love (2002) – directed by Alan Ereira and Phil Grabsky
- Terry Jones' Medieval Lives (2004)
- The Story of 1 (2005)
- Terry Jones' Barbarians (2006)
- Terry Jones' Great Map Mystery (2008)
- In Charlie Chaplin's Footsteps with Terry Jones (2015)
- Boom Bust Boom (2015)

== Award and recognition ==
- Terry Jones was nominated for Grammy Awards three times for Best Comedy Recording:
1. In 1975, for Matching Tie and Handkerchief (Album)
2. In 1980, for Monty Python's Contractual Obligation Album (Album)
3. In 1983, for Monty Python's The Meaning of Life (Album)
- In 1976, his directorial debut film Monty Python and the Holy Grail won the British Fantasy Awards.
- In 2016, an asteroid, 9622 Terryjones, was named in his honour.
- In 2016, he received a Lifetime Achievement award at the BAFTA Cymru Awards for his outstanding contribution to television and film.

In April 2026 a statue of Jones, depicted by sculptor Nick Elphick in his recurring Python role of the nude organist, was unveiled in Colwyn Bay by Michael Palin and Terry Gilliam.
