= Erik the Viking =

1989 British comedy-fantasy film by Terry Jones

- US theatrical release poster
- Directed by: Terry Jones
- Written by: Terry Jones
- Based on: The Saga of Erik the Viking by Terry Jones
- Produced by: John C. Goldstone
- Starring: Tim Robbins; Terry Jones; Eartha Kitt; Mickey Rooney; Tsutomu Sekine; John Cleese; Antony Sher; Imogen Stubbs
- Cinematography: Ian Wilson
- Edited by: George Akers
- Music by: Neil Innes
- Production companies: Prominent Features; Svensk Filmindustri
- Distributed by: United International Pictures (United Kingdom); Svensk Filmindustri (Sweden)
- Release dates: 1 September 1989 (Sweden); 22 September 1989 (US); 29 September 1989 (UK)
- Running time: 107 minutes
- Countries: United Kingdom; Sweden
- Language: English
- Box office: $1,932,642

Erik the Viking is a 1989 British comedy-fantasy film written and directed by Terry Jones. The film was inspired by Jones's children's book The Saga of Erik the Viking (1983), but the plot is completely different. Jones also appears in the film as King Arnulf.

== Plot ==
Erik, a young Viking, discovers that he has no taste for rape and pillage, and suffers guilt over the death of an innocent woman, Helga.

Erik learns from the wise woman Freya that Fenrir the wolf has swallowed the sun, plunging the world into the age of Ragnarök. Erik resolves to travel to Asgard to petition the gods to end Ragnarök. Freya informs him that to do so he must seek the Horn Resounding in the land of Hy-Brasil. The first note blown upon the Horn will take Erik and his crew to Asgard, the second will awaken the gods, and the third will bring the crew home. Erik sets out with a crew of all ages and professions from his village, including Harald, a Christian missionary who does not believe the myths.

Keitel Blacksmith is persuaded by his apprentice Loki into secretly opposing Erik's plan, and he joins Erik's crew to sabotage Erik's plans. Loki sneaks out to inform Halfdan the Black, a local warlord afraid that peace will mean the end of his reign. Halfdan's crew sets sail in pursuit of Erik.

Arriving at Hy-Brasil, Erik and crew are astonished to find it a sunlit land where the people, who dress like ancient Greeks, are exceedingly friendly and hospitable (if musically untalented). Erik promptly falls in love with Princess Aud, daughter of King Arnulf. During one of their romantic encounters, Erik hides from Arnulf using Aud's magic cloak of invisibility.

Aud has warned the Vikings that should blood ever be shed upon Hy-Brasil, the entire island would sink beneath the waves. Erik and his crew defend Hy-Brasil against Halfdan's ship. Loki is found aboard the ship, and he pretends to have sneaked aboard to sabotage it. In gratitude for Erik's having saved Hy-Brasil, King Arnulf presents him with the Horn Resounding, which is much larger than Erik had imagined. Loki steals the Horn's mouthpiece in the night, without which it cannot be sounded, and persuades Keitel to throw it in the sea. Snorri, one of Erik's men, catches them in the act and Loki kills him. A single drop of the man's blood falls from Loki's dagger and triggers an earthquake that causes the island to sink.

Erik's crew prepare to escape in their ship with Aud and the Horn safely aboard. Arnulf refuses to join them, denying that the island is sinking, up to the very moment he and the other islanders are swallowed by the waves. Aud, who witnessed Snorri's murder and was able to recover the mouthpiece, sounds the first note on the Horn. The ship is propelled over the edge of the flat Earth and into space, where it comes to rest upon the plane of Asgard. Erik sounds the second note to awaken the gods, and he and his crew climb a path made of stars to approach the great Hall of Valhalla.

Erik and the crew encounter old friends and enemies slain in battle. The gods are revealed to be petulant children who have no interest in answering mortal prayers. Harald the missionary sees neither hall, nor ghosts or gods, and passes intangibly through its walls due to his Christianity. Odin persuades Fenrir to spit out the sun, but tells Erik that the end of Ragnarök will not bring peace to the world. Odin then informs Erik that he and his crew cannot return home. Nor may they remain in Valhalla, since they were not slain in battle; instead they are to be cast into the fiery Pit of Hel. Some of the crew who died earlier in the adventure attempt to save them, but even as they are drawn into the Pit, they hear the Horn Resounding's third note, blown by Harald, who had returned to the ship, which flings them clear.

Erik's crew, including the formerly dead men, immediately find themselves back in their home village. They are dismayed to find that Halfdan and his soldiers have arrived before them and are holding the villagers captive. Halfdan and his men are suddenly crushed to death by Erik's ship as it falls out of the sky, with Harald aboard. As the villagers celebrate Erik's return and Halfdan's defeat, the sun rises, ending the age of Ragnarök.

== Cast ==
- Tim Robbins as Erik
- Mickey Rooney as Erik's grandfather
- Eartha Kitt as Freya
- Terry Jones as King Arnulf
- Imogen Stubbs as Princess Aud
- John Cleese as Halfdan the Black
- Antony Sher as Loki
- Charles McKeown as Sven's Dad
- Tim McInnerny as Sven the Berserk
- John Gordon Sinclair as Ivar the Boneless
- Richard Ridings as Thorfinn Skullsplitter
- Freddie Jones as Harald the Missionary
- Samantha Bond as Helga
- Danny Schiller as Snorri the Miserable
- Gary Cady as Keitel Blacksmith
- Matyelok Gibbs as Erik's Mum
- Jim Broadbent as Ernest the Viking
- Jim Carter as Jennifer the Viking
- Graham McTavish as Thangbrand
- Neil Innes as Hy-Brasilian
- Allan Surtees as Thorfinn's Dad
- Simon Evans as Odin
- Matthew Baker as Thor
- Tsutomu Sekine as Slavemaster
- John Scott Martin as Ingemund The Old

== Production ==
Principal photography took place at Shepperton Studios in England. Some footage of Erik's village and environments was shot in Norway, while the Hy-Brasil sequence was filmed in Malta. Artwork was made by Tolkien artist Alan Lee. The music score was composed by Neil Innes.

Amadeus star Tom Hulce was originally going to star as Erik, but he decided instead to pursue his stage career.

The production by the Monty Python company Prominent Features received financial backing from Swedish Svensk Filmindustri, which contributed to the film having its premiere in Sweden on 1 September 1989, followed by the US on 22 September, and the UK on 29 September. On cinema, it had a running time of 107 minutes, but, unhappy with the film's slow pacing, Jones cut it down to 89 minutes for the VHS release the following year.

In 2006, Jones was given the opportunity to re-edit the film for its DVD release. He delegated the actual editing work to his son Bill, who produced a 75-minute "Director's Son's Cut", with re-ordered scenes and much tighter pacing as well as a completely remixed and re-dubbed soundtrack.

=== Media adaptations ===
Graham Thompson adapted the film into a 1989 comic book.

A video game for the Nintendo Entertainment System was in development by Eurocom and was to be published by Video System and Kemco but was cancelled before release.

== Reception ==
On Rotten Tomatoes the film has an approval rating of 50% based on reviews from 20 critics.

Variety magazine gave the film a positive review: "The idea of telling the story of a Viking warrior who thought there must be more to life than rape and pillage is an amusing one", and concluded that it was "an enjoyable film". Vincent Canby of The New York Times gave it 3 out of 5 and wrote: "Doesn't measure up to the best of the Python films, but it consistently entertains through the occasional gags that do not work and dialogue that is sometimes obscured by sound effects."

Roger Ebert of the Chicago Sun-Times gave the film 0 out of a possible 4 stars, calling it "An utterly worthless exercise in waste and wretched excess, uninformed by the slightest spark of humor, wit or coherence." Chris Willman of the Los Angeles Times gave it a negative review, and called it "A stillborn comedy in which minutes sometimes mysteriously go by between even attempted gags, and in which virtually no comic scene works up to any kind of viable punch line or payoff."

=== Box office ===
It made £845,436 in the UK.
