= Ancient Inventions =

- Genre: Documentary
- Written by: Terry Jones; Daniel Percival
- Directed by: Daniel Percival; Phil Grabsky
- Presented by: Terry Jones
- Country of origin: United Kingdom
- Original language: English
- No. of seasons: 1
- No. of episodes: 3

Production
- Running time: 150 minutes
- Production company: Seventh Art Productions

Original release
- Network: BBC
- Release: 13 September 1998

Ancient Inventions was a BBC historical documentary series released in 1998. It was presented by former Monty Python member Terry Jones and looked at great inventions of the ancient world. The series is split into 3 episodes, namely City Life, Sex and Love, and War and Conflicts, all around 50 min long.

It was produced by Phil Grabsky of Seventh Art.
