= Phil Grabsky =

British filmmaker

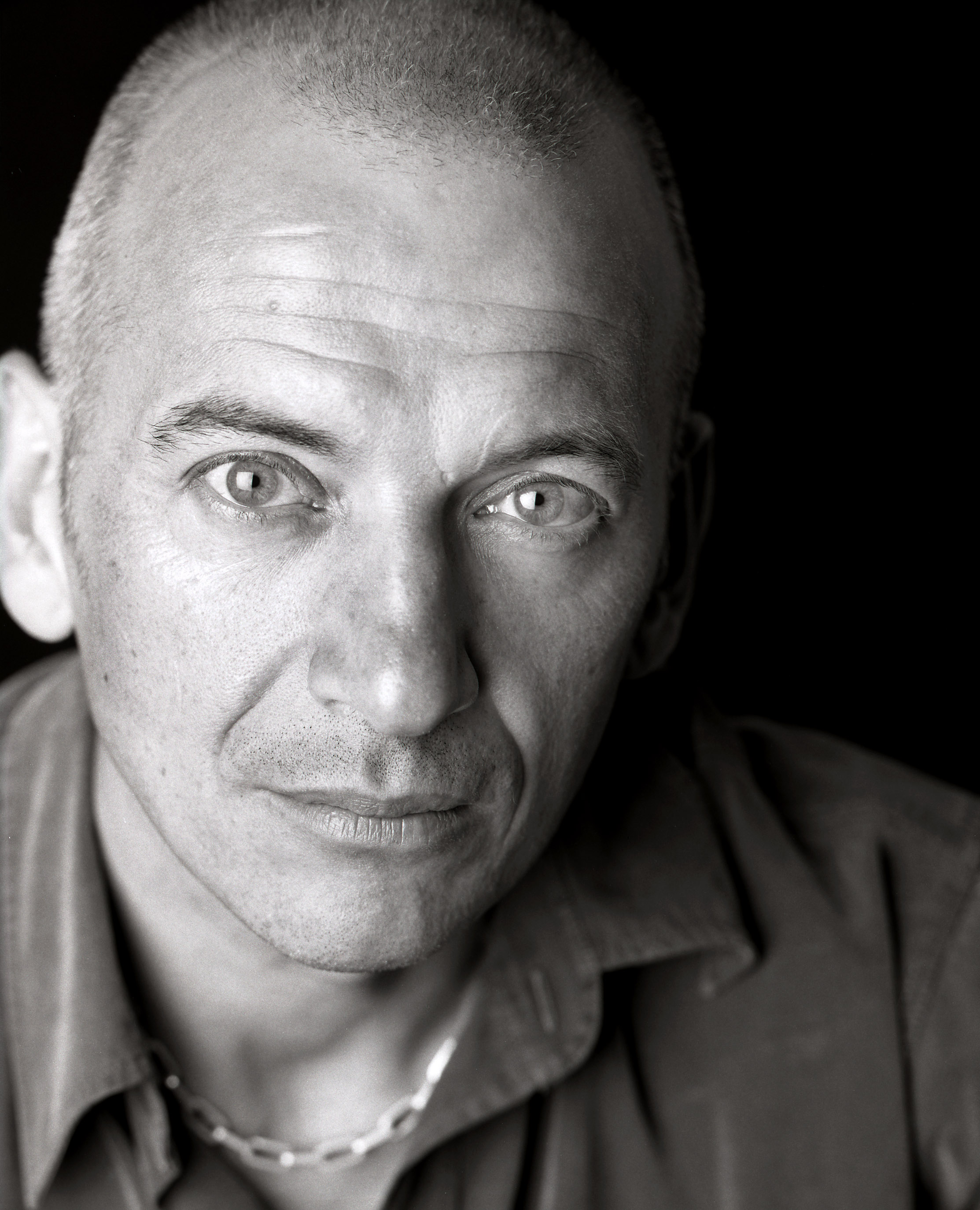

Phil Grabsky is a British documentary film-maker.

His film In Search of Mozart was shown at the Barbican Concert Hall in 2006.

Escape from Luanda (2007) is about three students at the only music school in Angola.

His books include The Great Artists – co-authored with Tim Marlow – and The Great Commanders.

In 2009, Grabsky and his colleagues started Exhibition on Screen, a series of documentaries on art exhibitions. It began with 'Leonardo Live'; other topics include Pompeii, van Gogh, Rembrandt, David Hockney, Frida Kahlo and Vermeer.

== Feature documentaries ==
- Caravaggio (2025) (co-directed with David Bickerstaff)
- My National Gallery (2024) (co-directed with Ali Ray)
- Pissarro: Father of Impressionism (2022)
- My Childhood, My Country – 20 Years in Afghanistan (2021)
- The Danish Collector: Delacroix to Gauguin (2021)
- Sunflowers (2021)
- Easter in Art (2020)
- Frida Kahlo (2020)
- Raphael Revealed (2020)
- Lucian Freud: A Self Portrait (2020)
- Leonardo: The Works (2019)
- Van Gogh and Japan (2019)
- Young Picasso (2019)
- Degas: Passion For Perfection (2018)
- David Hockney at the Royal Academy of Arts (2017)
- Michelangelo: Love and Death (2017)
- The Artist's Garden: American Impressionism (2017)
- I, Claude Monet (2017)
- Canaletto and the Art of Venice (2017)
- The Curious World of Hieronymus Bosch (2016)
- Painting the Modern Garden: from Monet to Matisse (2016)
- Concerto - A Beethoven Journey (2015)
- Renoir: Revered and Reviled (2015)
- Goya: Visions of Flesh and Blood (2015)
- The impressionists and the Man Who Made Them (2015)
- Vincent van Gogh: a New Way of Seeing (2015)
- Girl with a Pearl Earring (2015)
- Matisse Live (2014)
- In Search of Chopin (2014)
- Rembrandt from the National Gallery (2014)
- Leonardo from the National Gallery (2014)
- Vermeer (2013)
- Munch (2013)
- Manet (2012)
- Leonardo Live (2012)
- In Search of Haydn (2012)
- The Boy Mir - Ten Years in Afghanistan (2011)
- In Search of Beethoven (2009)
- Escape from Luanda (2007)
- Heavy Water: A Film for Chernoby (2006)
- In Search of Mozart (2006)
- The Boy who Plays on the Buddhas of Bamiyan (2003)
- Muhammad Ali – Through the Eyes of the World (2001)

== Selected TV programmes ==
=== Series ===
- Great Art (2018–present)
- Judgement Day: Images of Heaven and Hell (2004)
- Great Artists with Tim Marlow (2003)
- The Impressionists (1998)
- I, Caesar – The Rise and Fall of the Roman Empire (1997)
- Ancient Warriors (1994–1995)
- The Great Commanders (1993)
- Spain – In the Shadow of the Sun (1990)

=== One-offs ===
- Witness - A Child of Afghanistan: 20 Years of War (2021) 45 minute version of My Childhood, My Country: 20 Years in Afghanistan co-directed with Shoaib Sharifi
- Tim Marlow On..Highlights of the New Tate Modern (2006)
- The Hidden History of Rome – with Terry Jones (2001)
- The Hidden History of Egypt – with Terry Jones (2001)
- Brazil – An Inconvenient History (2000)
- The Lost Temple of Java (1999)

== Publications ==
- The Great Artists: From Giotto to Turner by Grabsky and Tim Marlow (2002)
- The Lost Temple of Java by Grabsky (1999)
- I, Caesar: Ruling the Roman Empire by Grabsky (1997)
- The Great Commanders: Alexander, Caesar, Nelson, Napoleon, Grant and Zhukov by Grabsky (1995)

== Awards ==
- My Childhood, My Country - 20 Years in Afghanistan (2021)
  - Best Single Documentary - BAFTA Television Awards (2022)
  - Best Documentary - Royal Television Society (2022)
  - Phoenix Award for Best Documentary - Film Festival Cologne (2021)
  - Best Documentary - Seminici Valladolid International Film Festival (2021)
  - Golden Reel for Best Documentary - Tiburon Film Festival (2021)
  - Best International Documentary - DC International Film Festival (2022)
  - Student Jury Award - One World International Human Rights Film Festival (2022)
  - Best Documentary Feature - San Luis Obispo International Film Festival (2022)
  - Best Feature Documentary - Titan International Film Festival (2022)
  - Best Feature Documentary - Bali International Film Festival (2022)
  - Author's Documentary - URTI Grand Prix European Film Festival(2022)
- Exhibition on Screen: Matisse (2015)
  - Royal Television Society Southern Awards - Best Non-broadcast (2015)
- The Boy Mir - 10 Years in Afghanistan (2011)
  - Best Documentary - Santa Barbara International Film Festival
  - Best Foreign Film - HumanDOC Documentary Film Festival, Poland
  - Runner up: long documentary - Al Jazeera International Documentary Film Festival
- In Search of Beethoven (2009) – Shortlisted: Creative communication - Royal Philharmonic Society Music Awards
- Escape from Luanda (2007) – Silver Award for Excellence - Park City Film Music Festival
- In Search of Mozart (2006) – Best Documentary - Dubrovnik Film Festival
- Heavy Water: A Film for Chernobyl (2006) – Winner – Special Mention - Ourense International Independent Film Festival
- The Boy who Plays on the Buddhas of Bamiyan (2003)
  - Best Film, Cinematography and Editing - Gold Hugo in Chicago
  - First prize - Valladolid International Film Festival
  - Best Original Score (Dimitri Tchamouroff) – RTS Awards
