= Unbound (publisher) =

British publishing company

- Parent company: United Authors Publishing Ltd.
- Status: Defunct; bankruptcy
- Founded: 9 June 2010; 16 years ago
- Founder: Justin Pollard, John Mitchinson, Dan Kieran
- Defunct: January 2025
- Country of origin: United Kingdom
- Headquarters location: London, N1
- Publication types: Books
- Official website: unbound.com

Unbound, the online trading name of United Authors Publishing Ltd, was a privately held international crowdfunded publishing company. It was based in London, UK.

== History ==
The company was founded by John Mitchinson, director of research for the British television panel game QI; Justin Pollard, historian and QI researcher (who stepped back in 2014); and author Dan Kieran who left in 2022.

In January 2025, the company went into administration, leaving many of its authors owed tens of thousands of pounds in royalties they had earned. Mitchinson and new CEO Archna Sharma bought the company later that month, promising to honour all projects and contracts. In May 2025, Sharma said that the new company, Boundless, will not pay existing authors what they are due unless or until the company "survives and thrives", in which case, they will still only make "goodwill payments".

Authors voiced their opinions on the situation, notably, published on 4 June 2025, Daniel Hardcastle (known by the pseudonym NerdCubed) made a commentary video on YouTube, suggesting major management failures internally, remarking that "the sales director, marketing manager, head of rights, communications director, head of finance, and three editors have all just left the company", "[there are] 238 people who this affects, and I've been speaking to them and each one has their own unique story about how Unbound screwed something massive up", "we've had endless lies about almost every facet of the business", and concluding with "we've lawyered up, both individually, and in groups of authors".

The new publisher, Boundless along with its Neem Tree Press imprint, went into liquidation in mid-2025. In August 2025 Will Atkinson, the former head of Atlantic Books, set up a new publishing company, Wilton Square, in order to initially "provide a safe and secure home" for authors previously published by Unbound.

== Projects ==
In 2016, Unbound launched a podcast called Backlisted, involving a guest (typically a writer) share a book they love and why it deserves more coverage. Some bookshops now carry a Backlisted section due to the popularity of the podcast.

In autumn 2017, Unbound launched Boundless, an online literary magazine with a focus on long-form writing and tackling the decline in traditional media. Arifa Akbar, former literary editor of The Independent, was brought in as the editor.

In March 2021, the company announced a crowdfunder for 42: the wildly improbable ideas of Douglas Adams, a book based on Douglas Adams' papers, edited by Kevin Jon Davies. The book was published on 28 August 2023 (ISBN 9781800182684) and became a Sunday Times number-one bestseller.

== Selected authors ==
The following authors were on the original launch list:

- Jonathan Meades
- Amy Jenkins
- Rupert Isaacson
- Terry Jones
