= List of Colombian documentary films =

This is a list of documentary films produced in the Colombian cinema, ordered by year and decade of release.

== 1910s ==
Title	Director	Cast	Notes
1914
El triunfo de la fe	Floro Manco		Documentary
1915
El drama del 15 de octubre	Francisco di Doménico, Vincenzo di Doménico		Also known as La vida del General Rafael Uribe.

== 1920s ==
Title	Director	Cast	Notes
1925
Manizales City	Félix R. Restrepo		

== 1930s ==
Title	Director	Cast	Notes
1933
Colombia Victoriosa	Gonzalo Acevedo Bernal, Álvaro Acevedo Bernal		

== 1940s ==
Title	Director	Cast	Notes
1944
Alas de Colombia	Gonzalo Acevedo Bernal, Álvaro Acevedo Bernal		
1945
De Cartagena a Cumaná	Gonzalo Acevedo Bernal, Álvaro Acevedo Bernal		

== 1960s ==
Title	Director	Cast	Notes
1960
Luz en la selva	Enoch Roldán		
1963
Rhapsodie in blue: Rapsodia en Bogotá	José María Arzuaga		
1967
Colombia, paraíso de América	Juan Ocampo		

== 1970s ==
Title	Director	Cast	Notes
1970
Se llamaría Colombia	Francisco Norden		
1971
Cali, ciudad de América	Diego León Giraldo		
Planas, testimonio de un etnocidio	Marta Rodríguez, Jorge Silva		
Oiga vea!	Carlos Mayolo, Luis Ospina		
1972
Chircales	Marta Rodríguez, Jorge Silva		
1974
Camilo, el cura guerrillero	Francisco Norden		
1975
The Abandoned Children	Danny Lyon		American-Colombian co-production.
1976
Corralejas de Sincelejo	Ciro Durán, Mario Mitrotti		Winner of Melbourne International Film Festival.
1977
Gamín	Ciro Durán		French-Colombian co-production. Best New Director at San Sebastián International Film Festival.

== 1980s ==
Title	Director	Cast	Notes
1980
Amazonas, infierno y paraíso	Rómulo Delgado		
1982
Nuestra voz de tierra, memoria y futuro	Marta Rodríguez, Jorge Silva		Won FIPRESCI Prize and OCIC's Forum of New Cinema awards at Berlin International Film Festival. Golden Colon at Huelva Latin American Film Festival.
1984
Los emberá	Roberto Triana		
1985
La guerra del centavo	Ciro Durán		
1986
Elementos para una acuarela	Sergio Cabrera		
Andrés Caicedo: Unos pocos buenos amigos	Luis Ospina		
1987
Antonio María Valencia: Música de Cámara	Luis Ospina		
1988
Amor, mujeres y flores	Marta Rodríguez, Jorge Silva		Colombian-British co-production.

== 1990s ==
Title	Director	Cast	Notes
1990
Comment vont les enfants	Lino Brocka, Rolan Bykov, Ciro Durán, Jerry Lewis, Euzhan Palcy, Jean-Luc Godard, Anne-Marie Miéville		Colombian-French-Nigerien-Filipo-Soviet-American-Swiss co-production (UNICEF-sponsored).
1992
Un ángel subterráneo	Óscar Campo		Won Grand Coral at Havana Film Festival.
1993
Nuestra película	Luis Ospina		
1994
Secuestro	Camila Motta		
A la rueda, rueda de paz y candela	Ana Victoria Ochoa, José Miguel Restrepo		
1996
Do Wabura	Beatriz Bermúdez		
1997
Un ángel del pantano	Óscar Campo		
1998
Eduardo Umaña	Jairo Escobar		
Fragmentos	Herib Campos-Cerbera, Carlos Santa		
1999
50 años de monte	Yves Billon		French-Colombian co-production.
Running for Bogotá	Odile Isralson		Colombian-American co-production. Nominated for Best Documentary at Cinequest Film Festival.

== 2000s ==
Title	Director	Cast	Notes
2000
Estanislao Zuleta, biografía de un pensador	José Antonio Dorado		
2001
Orozco el embalsamador	Kiyotaka Tsurisaki		Japanese-Colombian co-production.
Nunca más	Fernando Restrepo, Marta Rodríguez		
El proyecto del diablo	Óscar Campo		
2002
Noticias de la guerra en Colombia	Óscar Campo		
Exiliados en exilio	Rolando Vargas		
Función de gala	Pakiko Ordóñez		
El rostro del secuestro	Marcelo Salinas		
Mirada de cóndor	María Cecilia de Posada		Spanish-Colombian co-production.
2003
Tomas de guerra	Patricia Castaño, Adalaida Trujillo		Colombian-German-British co-production.
La desazón suprema: Retrato de Fernando Vallejo	Luis Ospina		Best Documentary at Toulouse Latin America Film Festival.
Bienvenidos a Colombia	Catalina Villar		Colombian-French co-production.
Memoria de los silenciados: El baile rojo	Yezid Campos		
2004
Carlitos Medellin	Jean-Stéphane Sauvaire		French-Colombian co-production.
Ciudadano Escobar	Sergio Cabrera		Colombian-Spanish co-production.
Los archivos privados de Pablo Escobar	Marc De Beaufort		
Rebel Music Americas	Marie Boti, Malcolm Guy		Canadian-Brazilian-Argentine-Colombian co-production.
Del palenque de San Basilio	Erwin Göggel		Best Documentary at Bogotá Film Festival.
Circo para todos	Luis Eduardo Merino Peláez, Amanda Rueda		
La gracia de caer	Claudia Pedraza, Karolina Ramírez		
Aguaviva: La vida en tres maletas	Mario Burbano, Verónica Marchiaro		Argentine-Colombian-German co-production.
La tranca	Alexandra Henao		Colombian-Venezuelan co-production.
Fidelidad	Juan Zapata		Brazilian-Colombian co-production.
2005
La sierra	Scott Dalton, Margarita Martínez	Alfredo Aguilar, Eva Ahen, Juan Miguel Anzola	American-Colombian co-production. Nominated for Best Documentary at Independent Spirit Awards. Won Grand Jury Prize - Documentary Features at Miami International Film Festival.
Viajero de mí mismo	Galina Likosova, Hernán Restrepo		
Claroscuro, la tragedia de un gran músico	Galina Likosova, Hernán Restrepo		
Así como la guerreo	Lucas Nieto		
Hoja de vida	Silvia María Hoyos		
Detrás de P.: The Making of 'Perder es cuestión de método'	Margarita Jimeno		
Lenguaje maestro	Pakiko Ordóñez		
2006
Caro es caro	Juliana Flórez		
Ritual de vida	José Roberto Levy		Mexican-Colombian co-production.
Paraíso	Felipe Guerrero		Best Experimental Documentary at Barcelona Docupolis. Special Mention at Marseille Festival of Documentary Film.
El Mágico	Camilo Martin Ortiz		
Manati, retablos de un pueblo subdesarrollado y feliz	Hugo Santander		Colombian-French-American co-production.
Con olor a melón	Mario Burbano		
La gran Colombia	Annie Canavaggio, Gabriela Sosa, Diego Velazco, Fanny Veliz		Colombian-Ecuadorian-Venezuelan-Panamanian co-production.
2007
El sueño del paraíso	Carlos Palau		
Pablo Escobar, ángel o demonio	Jorge Granier		Colombian-Venezuelan co-production.
Personal Che	Douglas Duarte, Adriana Marino		Brazilian-American-Colombian co-production.
Budapest to Gettysburg	Jake Boritt		Austrian-Colombian-Hungarian-Romanian-American co-production.
Margem	Maya Da-Rin		Brazilian-Colombian-Peruvian co-production.
El corazón	Diego García Moreno		
Sunshine Swim Team	Jaime Escallon-Buraglia		Colombian-Canadian co-production.
Hartos Evos, aquí hay. Los cocaleros del Chapare	Manuel Ruiz, Héctor Ulloque		Colombian-Bolivian co-production.
Salvador, el fuego y los sueños	Fernando Valenzuela		Argentine-Colombian-American co-production.
The Longing: The Forgotten Jews of South America	Gabriela Bohm		American-Israeli-Ecuadorian-Colombian-Brazilian-Argentine co-production.
Gabriel García Márquez: La escritura embrujada	Yves Billon, Mauricio Martínez-Cavard		French-Colombian co-production.
Un tigre de papel	Luis Ospina		2nd place for Best Documentary at Lima Latin American Film Festival. Special Mention (Documentary Features) at Miami International Film Festival.
2008
¡Colombia Vive!: 25 años de resistencia	Mauricio Gómez, Julio Sánchez Cristo		
16memorias	Camilo Botero		Won Audience Award and Special Mention (Dox Competition) at Miami International Film Festival.
Biblioburro, the Donkey Library	Carlos Rendón		French-Colombian-Belgium co-production.
Tumaco Pacífico	Samuel Córdoba		
Es más vida	Amanda Robalino, Johanna García Ruiz		Ecuadorian-Argentine-Colombian co-production.
Down the Road	Joel Christensen, Chris Gordon, Cody Shirk		American-Colombian-Costa Rican-Salvadoran-Honduran-Nicaraguan-Panamanian co-production.
Barranquilleros, herederos de una tradición	Ika Santamaria		
The Golden Age	Scott Duncan, Phil Tuckett		American-Paraguayan-Ecuadorian-Colombian-Chilean co-production.
Bagatela	Jorge Ramos		Won Human Rights Award at Buenos Aires International Festival of Independent Cinema.
2009
Pecados de mi padre	Nicolas Entel		Argentine-Colombian co-production. Nominated for Best Documentary Feature at Argentine Film Critics Association. Won Audience Award and Grand Jury Prize (Dox Competition) at Miami International Film Festival. Nominated for Outstanding Individual Achievement in a Craft (Music and Sound) at News & Documentary Emmy Award. Nominated for World Cinema (Documentary) at Sundance Film Festival.
Falsos positivos	Simone Bruno, Dado Carillo		American-Colombian-Italian co-production.
La casa	Tayo Cortés		Won Silver Dove (International Competition) at Dok Leipzig.
Bagatela	Jorge Ramos		Won Human Rights Award at Buenos Aires International Festival of Independent Cinema.
La costura de América	Iosu López		15-countries co-production.
Dalai Lama, Colombia	Lina Dorado		American-Colombian-Chinese co-production
Robatierra	Margarita Martínez, Miguel Salazar		
El Salado, rostro de una masacre	Antonio Rubio		
Rosita no se desplaza	Alessandro Acito, Leonardo Valderrama		Colombian-Italian co-production.
Babalú, la vida cantada	Jaime Dávila, Alex Toedtli Mera		Spanish-Colombian co-production.
Sin historia no hay cámara	Patricia Boadas, Carlos Sánchez-Llibre		Colombian-Spanish co-production.
Blas: El hombre y su leyenda	Galina Likosova, Hernán Humberto Restrepo Botero		
Lucky 13	David Caneva, Johanna Zuleta		
Adiós al cholero	Carolina Arango, Carlos Mario Urrea		
Leche brava	Ramón Jimeno		
Garras de Oro: Mudo testigo de una injusticia	Óscar Campo, Ramiro Arbeláez		
La virgen de la arena	Jorge Caicedo		

== 2010s ==
Title	Director	Cast	Notes
2010
The Two Escobars	Jeff Zimbalist, Michael Zimbalist		Part of 30 for 30 documentary series. Nominated for Best Documentary Screenplay at Writers Guild of America Award. Nominated for Best International Documentary Film at Zurich Film Festival.
Pablo's Hippos	Antonio Von Hildebrand, Lawrence Elman		British-Colombian co-production.
Apaporis: In Search of One River	José Antonio Dorado		American-Colombian co-production. Won Honorable Mention (Documentary on the Environment) at Bogota Film Festival.
Impunity	Juan José Lozano, Hollman Morris		Swiss-French-Colombian co-production. Nominated for Open Eyes Jury Award at Nuremberg International Human Rights Film Festival.
Pequeñas voces	Jairo Eduardo Carrillo, Óscar Andrade		First Latin American film in 3D. Nominated for Grand Jury Prize (Knight Dox Competition) at Miami International Film Festival.
Uno, la historia de un gol	Carlos Moreno, Gerardo Muyshondt		Colombian-Salvadoran co-production. Nominated for Grand Jury Prize (Dox Competition) at Miami International Film Festival.
My Kidnapper	Mark Henderson, Kate Horne		British-Colombian-German co-production. Nominated for Best Documentary at Warsaw International Film Festival.
Antanas' Way	Margarita Martínez		
Los abrazos del río	Nicolás Rincón Gille		Belgium-Colombian co-production. Won Golden Montgolfiere at Three Continents Festival. Nominated for Robert and Frances Flaherty Prize at Yamagata International Documentary Festival.
Saving the Disposable Ones	Stuart Taner		Colombian-American co-production.
Impunity	Juan José Lozano, Hollman Morris		Swiss-French-Colombian co-production. Nominated for Open Eyes Jury Award at Nuremberg International Human Rights Film Festival.
Yo tengo ya la casita	Nicolás Guarín, René Palomino		
Meandros	Manuel Ruiz Montealegre, Hector Ulloque Franco		
La selva en blanco	Margarita Martínez		Colombian-American co-production.
Pescador de lunas	Christian Bitar		
La tierra se quedó	Juan Sarmiento		German-Colombian co-production. Nominated for Producer Award at Potsdam Sehsüchte.
La Dany: The Diva of Bolivar Park	Jim Giles, Julie Giles		Canadian-Colombian co-production.
Low Coal	Jordan Freeman		American-Colombian co-production.
Mamá Chocó	Diana Kuéllar		
Soñadores en el hospicio: Rompiendo los muros	Roberto Niño, Arturo Roa		Colombian-Argentine co-production.
Fanny para siempre	Daniel Álvarez Mikey		Colombian-Spanish-Italian-French-Argentine co-production.
Dance with Destiny	Derrick Jensen		American-Colombian-Indian-British co-production.
Beatriz González ¿Por qué llora si ya reí?	Diego García	Miller Quintero, Daniel Estrada, Carlos Bardem	
2011
Cocaine Unwrapped	Rachel Seifert		British-Mexican-American-Ecuadorian-Colombian-Bolivian co-production.
Kingdom Come	Paiman Kalayeh, John Lyons Murphy		American-Colombian-German co-production.
The (R)evolution of Immortal Technique	Cary Stuart		American-Afghan-British-Moroccan-Spanish-Danish-Peruvian-Colombian-Dutch co-production.
Love Costs Everything	M. D. Neely		American-Colombian-French-Indian-Egyptian-Iraqi co-production.
La toma	Angus Gibson, Miguel Salazar		Colombian-French-American co-production.
Encuere	Simon Brand		Colombian-American co-production.
The Dakota Hunter	Axel Ebermann		American-Colombian-Malagasy-Thai-Dutch co-production.
Esperando el tsunami	Vincent Moon		Colombian-French-Argentine co-production.
Putas o Peluqueras	Mónica Moya		
200 Kms/h	Luis Reina		
El rayo	Laurence Salzmann		American-Colombian co-production.
Ser un ser humano	Abdelsallam Al-Hajj, Claudia Alves, Laura Cardona, Sreya Chatterhee, Jean Jean León, Marina McCartney, Rafael Ruíz, Helena Salguero		Cuban-Jordanian-Spanish-Samoan-Indian-Portuguese-Colombian-Dominican-New Zealander-American co-production.
Sobre huellas	Nicolás Reyes		
Birth Maternity Journal	Jorge Ramos		
Tierra de negros	Víctor Agudelo		
IMA: Territorio	Alex Rubio, Jaime Barrios		
Tantos, tan invisibles	Victor Beltrán, Hugo Marín, Pilar Missas, Lina Vanegas		
Eterno nómada	Ernesto McCausland		
Neo nato: El principio de todo está en lo más pequeño	Juan Camilo Ramírez		
Oro colombiano	Sanjay Agarwal, Iván Higa		Dutch-Colombian co-production. Nominated for Best Documentary and Foreign Film at São Paulo International Film Festival.
Emberá	Andrés Estefan Ramírez		
2012
Manatí	Hugo Santander		
Aluna	Alan Ereira		British-Colombian co-production. Nominated for Sheffield Green Award at Sheffield International Documentary Festival.
Sonido bestial	Sylvia Vargas Gómez, Sandro Romero Rey		
We Women Warriors	Nicole Karsin		American-Colombian co-production.
The Battle for Land	Juan Mejía Botero		
Illegal.Co	Alessandro Angulo		
Hay algo más	Travers Nisbet		Colombian-American co-production.
Corta	Felipe Guerrero		Colombian-French-Argentine co-production.
Dalua Downhill	Rodrigo Pesavento, Tiago de Castro, Fernanda Franke Krumel		Brazilian-American-Argentine-Australian-Canadian-Colombian-Czech-German-Italian-Peruvian-South African-Swiss co-production.
La maldición, el milagro y el burro	Ayoze O'Shanahan		
La nuit de l'homme	François Bucher		Swedish-Colombian-German-Egyptian-Polish-Peruvian co-production.
Espejito del Curubo	Carolina Pardo		
Cerro rico, tierra rica	Juan Vallejo		Colombian-Bolivian-American co-production.
Solving for X	Theo Lipfert		American-Liberian-Guatemalan-Colombian co-production.
Nacer: Diario de maternidad	Jorge Caballero Ramos		
Quijote	Juan Pablo Ríos		
Habitantes de Babel	Alejandro Ángel		
El silencio no perdona	William Torres		
Frankenstein no asusta en Colombia!!!	Erik Zúñiga		
2013
Sur le chemin de l'école	Pascal Plisson		French-Chinese-South African-Brazilian-Colombian co-production. Won Best Documentary Film at César Awards. Won Audience Award (Favorite Independent World Feature) at Mill Valley Film Festival.
Mambo Cool	Chris Gude		
Benghazi: Beyond the Front Line	Nathalia Orozco		Colombian-French-Mexican-Libyan co-production.
Glacial Balance	Ethan Steinman		Argentine-American-Peruvian-Bolivian-Chilean-Colombian-Ecuadorian co-production.
El viaje del acordeón	Andrew Tucker, Rey Sagbini		Colombian-German co-production.
RUTZ: Global Generation Travel	António Caetano Faria		Macanese-Portuguese-Argentine-Bolivian-Chilean-Colombian-Ecuadorian-Paraguayan-Peruvian co-production.
La Gorgona, historias fugadas	Camilo Botero		Nominated for Best Documentary at Warsaw International Film Festival.
La eterna noche de las doce lunas	Priscila Padilla		Nominated for Best Documentary at The Platino Awards for Iberoamerican Cinema.
Pepe el andaluz	Alejandro Alvarado, Concha Barquero		Spanish- Canadian-Colombian-Polish-Argentine co-production.
Tacacho	Felipe Monroy		Colombian-Swiss co-production. Nominated for Filmschool Award at Munich International Documentary Festival.
Global Vocals	Bryant Robinson, Jamaal Buchanan		Colombian-American co-production.
No hubo tiempo para la tristeza	Jorge Betancur		
Réquiem NN	Juan Manuel Echavarría		
Paper People	Andrés Vásquez		Colombian-American co-production.
The Duck Diaries: A Cold War Quest for Friendship Across the Americas	Matt Twommey		American-Venezuelan-Uruguayan-Peruvian-Paraguayan-Panamanian-Nicaraguan-Mexican-Honduran-Guatemalan-Salvadorian-Ecuadorian-Costa Rican-Colombian-Chilean-Brazilian-Bolivian-Argentine co-production.
Open Walls	Michel Arribehaute		French-American-Spanish-Mexican-Israeli-Colombian co-production.
Colombia invisible	Unai Aranzadi		Spanish-Colombian co-production.
Wait	Brian Oh		American-Peruvian-Ecuadorian-Colombian-Bolivian-Argentine co-production.
Ati y Mindiwa	Claudia Fischer		
El charco azul	Irene Lema		
Tales Coconuts Tell	Alejandro Jaramillo		Colombian-German-Panamanian co-production.
One Drum	Harley van Valem		Australian-Colombian-Brazilian-Bolivian-Belizean-American-Peruvian-Panamanian-Nicaraguan-Mexican-Honduran-Guatemalan-Salvadorian-Ecuadorian-Costa Rican co-production.
Walking on the Leaves	Tom Keith		American-Colombian-Dominican-Malian co-production.
The Wireless Generation	Drew Gilberth		American-Thai-Spanish-Mexican-Malaysian-Greek-Colombian co-production.
Urbílogo, Sumercé	Álvaro Perea, Carlos Jordanez		
Retratos de familia	Alexandra Cardona		
Apuntando al corazón	Claudia Gordillo, Bruno Federico		
Destinos Interrumpidos	Juan Carlos Echeverria, Danny Holguín		Best Documentary and Foreign Documentary at Atlanta International Documentary Film Festival. Won Victor Nieto Award for Best Documentary at Cartagena Film Festival.
Don Ca	Patricia Ayala		
2014
Disruption	Pamela Yates		American-Peruvian-Colombian-Brazilian co-production.
Infierno o paraíso	Piffano German, German Piffano		Colombian-Venezuelan-Spanish co-production.
Life is Sacred	Andreas M. Dalsgaard, Vivana Gómez, Nicolás Servide		Danish-Irish-Norwegian-Colombian co-production. Nominated for F:ACT Award at Copenhagen International Documentary Festival.
Memorias del calavero	Rubén Mendoza		
Caffeinated	Hanh Nguyen, Vishal Solanki		American-Colombian-Ethiopian-Guatemalan-Honduran-Indian-Italian-Lithuanian-Mexican-Nicaraguan-South Korean-Swedish-Swiss-Turkish-British co-production.
Parador húngaro	Patrick Alexander, Aseneth Suárez Ruíz		Hungarian-Colombian co-production.
Otra cosa no hay	Christiana Ochoa		American-Colombian co-production.
Bodies at War	Emily Cohen		American-Colombian co-production.
Going the Distance: A Honeymoon Adventure	Mike Clear, Alanna Clear, Paul Watson		British-Argentine-Bolivian-Canadian-Colombian-Costa Rican-Ecuadorian-Guatemalan-Mexican-Nicaraguan-Panamanian-Peruvian-American co-production.
Monte adentro	Nicolás Alonso		Colombian-Argentine co-production. Nominated for Golden Montgolfiere at Nantes Three Continents Festival.
Persiguiendo al dragón	Juan Camilo Olmos		Special Mention of the Opus Bonum Jury and nominated for Best Documentary Debut or Second Film and World Documentary at Jihlava International Documentary Film Festival.
Tranquilandia	Joel Stangle		
Garras de Oro: Herida abierta en un continente	Ramiro Arbeláez, Óscar Campo		
Estudio de reflejos	Juan David Soto		Colombian-British-Spanish co-production. Nominated for Opera Prima Award at IBAFF International Film Festival.
No todo es Vigilia	Hermes Paralluelo		Spanish-Colombian co-production.
Uncensored Documentary	Stephanie Catalina Martínez		American-Colombian co-production.
Caminando con música	Ronin Hsu		Colombian-Hong Kongese co-production.
Sanctus Tatarî Âli	Lisandra Ávila		Colombian-Turkish co-production.
Casa Margaritas	Raphaelle Ayach		
Rosa Ventorum	Galina Likosova, Hernán Humberto Restrepo		Colombian-Argentine-Austrian-Belgian-Danish-French-German-Italian-Polish-Spanish co-production.
Another Type of Intelligence	Ian Palmer		American-Argentine-Belizean-Chilean-Colombian-Costa Rican-Ecuadorian-Guatemalan-Honduran-Mexican-Nicaraguan-Panamanian-Peruvian co-production.
2015
Carta a una sombra	Miguel Salazar	Héctor Abad Gómez, Héctor Abad Faciolince, Cecilia Faciolince de Abad	
La buena vida	Jens Schanze		German-Swiss-Colombian-Dutch co-production.
Vivo en el Limbo	Dago García, Roberto Flores	Carlos Alexander Martínez, Carlos Mario Rincón Mendoza, Hugo Luís Urruchurto Navarro	
Colombia, magia salvaje	Mike Slee	(Nature and animals report)	
Porro hecho en Colombia	Adriana Lucía	(Biographical story)	
Hombres solos	Francisco Schmitt García		
Aislados	Marcela Lizcano		
Parte de Lima	Santiago Andrés Gómez		
La selva inflada	Alejandro Naranjo		
Nuestro Monte Luna	Pablo Alvarez-Mesa		Canadian-Colombian co-production.
Entrelazado	Riccardo Giacconi		
Todo comenzó por el fin	Luis Ospina		
Un asunto de tierras	Patricia Ayala Ruiz		
El valle sin sombras	Rubén Mendoza		
Home: The Country of Illusion	Josephine Landertinger Forero		
#artoffline	Manuel Correa		Norwegian-Colombian co-production. Nominated for Best Norwegian documentary and Gulluglen Award at Bergen International Film Festival. #artoffline held its international premiere as part of the International Film Festival Rotterdam.
Noche herida	Nicolás Rincón Gille		Belgian-Colombian co-production. Won SCAM Award (Mention) and nominated for Cinéma du Réel Award at Cinéma du Réel.
Isolated	Marcela Lizcano		Colombian-Ecuadorian-Mexican co-production.
The Good Life	Jens Schanze		Colombian-German-Swiss-Dutch co-production.
Spaces and Silences	Juan David Cárdenas		
Kome Urue, the Children of the Jungle	Carlos Felipe Montoya		
Amazona	Clare Weiskopf, Nicolas van Hemelryck	Valerie Meikle, Noa Van Hemelryck Weiskopf, Nicolas van Hemelryck, Clare Weiskopf, Diego Weiskopf	
El retorno	Juan Pablo Ríos		
Behind the Red Noses	Crystal V. Lesser		French-Colombian-Panamanian-Spanish-Venezuelan co-production.
La Siberia	Iván Sierra Sanjurjo, Gerrit Stollbrock		
Indivisible	Hilary Linder		American-Brazilian-Colombian-Mexican co-production.
Learning to See	Jake Oelman		American-Colombian-Ecuadorian-Peruvian co-production.
Patient	Jorge Caballero		
Chicas nuevas 24 horas	Mabel Lozano		Argentine-Colombian-Paraguayan-Peruvian-Spanish co-production.
Gabo: The Creation of Gabriel Garcia Marquez	Justin Webster		Spanish-French-American-Colombian-British co-production. Nominated for Best Documentary at Gaudí Awards.
El ruiseñor y la noche	Rubén Rojo Aura		Mexican-Spanish-Colombian co-production. Nominated for Best Mexican Film at Guadalajara International Film Festival.
2016
Guerras ajenas	Carlos Moreno, Lilia Luciano		Colombian-American co-production.
Rumba Calling	Oliver Hill		
El culebro: la historia de mi papá	Nicolás Casanova	Hernando Casanova, Héctor Ulloa, Gloria Gómez, Silvio Ángel, Jimmy Salcedo, Manolo Cardona, Julián Román	
Home - El país de la ilusión	Josephine Landertinger		
Inmortal	Homer Etminani		
Jericó, el infinito vuelo de los días	Catalina Mesa		
2017
Señorita Maria	Rubén Mendoza		
Damiana	Andres Ramirez		
El silencio de los fusiles	Nathalia Orozco		
A River Below	Mark Grieco		American-Colombian co-production.
El fin de la guerra	Marc Silver		
Poner a actuar pájaros	Erwin Göggel		Nominated for Best Documentary at 7th Macondo Awards.
2018
Ciro y yo	Miguel Salazar	Ciro Galindo, Esneider Galindo	
La mujer de los 7 nombres	Nicolás Ordoñez, Daniela Castro	Yineth Trujillo Verján or others	
El Testigo	Kate Horne	Jesús Abad Colorado or others	
Yo no me llamo Rubén Blades	Abner Benaim	Rubén Blades, Sting, Residente, Paul Simon, Larry Harlow, Gilberto Santa Rosa	
Yo, Lucas	Lucas Maldonado	Lucas Maldonado, Matías Maldonado, Natalia Helo, Maia Landaburu, Lisbeth Pabón, Blas Jaramillo, Paula Ungar, Camila Loboguerrero, Soledad Castañeda, Esmeralda Pinzón, Heidi Abderhalden, Alberto Espinosa, Rafael Maldonado, Chloe Rutter, Luz Amorocho, Natalia Guarnizo, Antonio von Hildebrand, Ernesto Lleras, Moisés Rodríguez, Salomón Rodríguez	
En el Taller	Ana María Salas Vega	Carlos Salas, Olmedo Holguín, Sixta Anacaona, Hernan Sansone, Sara Salas, Paola Salas	
My way or the Highway	Silva Lorenzini	Silvia Lorenzini or others	
La Negociación	Margarita Martínez Escallón		
2019
The Smiling Lombana	Daniela Abad	Tito Lombana or others	
Ganges	Roberto Restrepo, Talía Carolina Osorio		
Doble Yo	Felipe Rugeles		
Homo Botanicus	Guillermo Quintero		
El sendero de la anaconda	Alessandro Angulo	Martín von Hildebrand, Wade Davis	
Lapü	César Alejandro Jaimes		
La Forma del Presente	Manuel Correa		
2020
2021
2022
2023
2024
Gutiérrez, una deuda pendiente	Iván Acosta Rojas		
Alma del Desierto	Monica Taboada Tapia		
Los sueños viajan con el viento	Inti Jacanamijoy		
Explora Colombia	Marco Antonio Contreras		
Carropasajero	Juan Pablo Polanco, César Alejandro Jaimes		
Sobre la mesa	Elvira Hernández		
La laguna del soldado	Pablo Álvarez-Mesa		
El Titán	Alexander Giraldo		
Minotauro	Joaquín Uribe		
Manos que hablan	Camilo Gómez Durán		
Igualada	Juan Mejía Botero		
Operación Esperanza: Los niños perdidos en el Amazonas	Tom Cross		
Barbitch	Diego González Cruz		
Bienvenidos conquistadores interplanetarios y del espacio sideral	Andrés Jurado		
El apocalipsis de San Juan	Simón Delacre, Patricio Dondo		
Hermanos por accidente	Alessandro Angulo		

== See also ==
- List of Colombian films
