= Kogui =

Kogui may refer to:

- Kogi people, an indigenous ethnic group in Colombia
- Kogi language, a Chibchan language of Colombia
