= Aluna =

2012 film

- Theatrical release poster
- Directed by: Alan Ereira
- Produced by: Alan Ereira; Ben Woolford (Executive)
- Starring: Alan Ereira; Mama Manuel Coronado; Mama Shibulata Zarabata; Francisca Zarabata
- Cinematography: Paulo Andrés Pérez
- Edited by: Andrew Philip
- Music by: Alejandro Ramirez Rojas
- Production company: Sunstone Films
- Release date: 17 June 2012 (Sheffield Doc/Fest)
- Running time: 91 minutes
- Countries: United Kingdom; Colombia
- Languages: English, Kogi
- Budget: £899,000 (estimated)

Aluna is a 2012 feature-length documentary film. It is a sequel to the 1990 BBC documentary From the Heart of The World: Elder Brother's Warning. The first documentary showed an ancient Kogi tribe civilisation (the Elder Brother) who emerge to offer their concern for people of the modern world (Younger Brother). Younger Brother is urged to change or suffer environmental disaster. After offering the warning, the Kogi retreat to their community hidden in the mountains of the Sierra Nevada de Santa Marta, Colombia.

In the second documentary, the Kogis have re-emerged, realising that the importance of their warning was not grasped. As well as warning Younger Brother, they have decided to share their understandings of how nature works in the belief that doing so will share their burden of healing the dying planet.

== Content summary ==
Realising that their warning in 1990 was not fully grasped, the Kogis become more proactive. Even though their civilisation has never used wheels or created writing, they diligently study film cameras and train their own indigenous film crew. The Kogis ask Alan Ereira, whom they allowed to film their 1990 message, to assist. The Kogi Mamos decide that there will be "no more secrets": They want to demonstrate their planetary healing sciences in front of the cameras to the modern world and show visible and measurable results. They also wish to teach other people how to conduct these sciences in order to heal the world. They speak with modern scientists in the belief that they have a different science to show them.

=== Kogi demonstration ===
To help convince the modern world of the importance preserving the planet, the Kogi demonstrate its interconnectivity. A small group of Kogis travel to London to fetch 400 kilometres (250 miles) of gold thread, reportedly the longest ever made.

Mama Shibulata, one of the Kogis Mamos in the group, visits the observatory at the University of London where he meets Richard Ellis, the Steele Professor of Astronomy. Ellis is astounded by Shibulata's knowledge of both the Solar System and astronomical discoveries such as dark energy.

After their return to Colombia with the gold thread, the Kogis conduct the demonstration. A group of leading modern scientists observe the results and find that the science of the Mamos may be at the 'cutting edge'

"They lay the gold thread from one river estuary in Colombia to another in order to show how the destruction of river estuaries feeds back up the river in the end to destroy the source of the river. Showing the interconnectedness of everything on the earth, this was the key element in their task, the purpose of which was showing that the earth itself is a living body in which everything is interconnected, and damage to some of it is damage to all of it."— Alan Ereira.

== Participation at UN summits ==
The 1990 documentary From the Heart of The World: Elder Brother's Warning was shown at the Earth Summit in Rio de Janeiro in 1992 and was seen to inspire delegates to take action.

'Aluna' was produced in time for another important UN environmental conference, the United Nations Conference on Sustainable Development held at Rio de Janeiro from 20–22 June 2012. Two Kogi Mamos were expected to attend the conference.

== Production ==
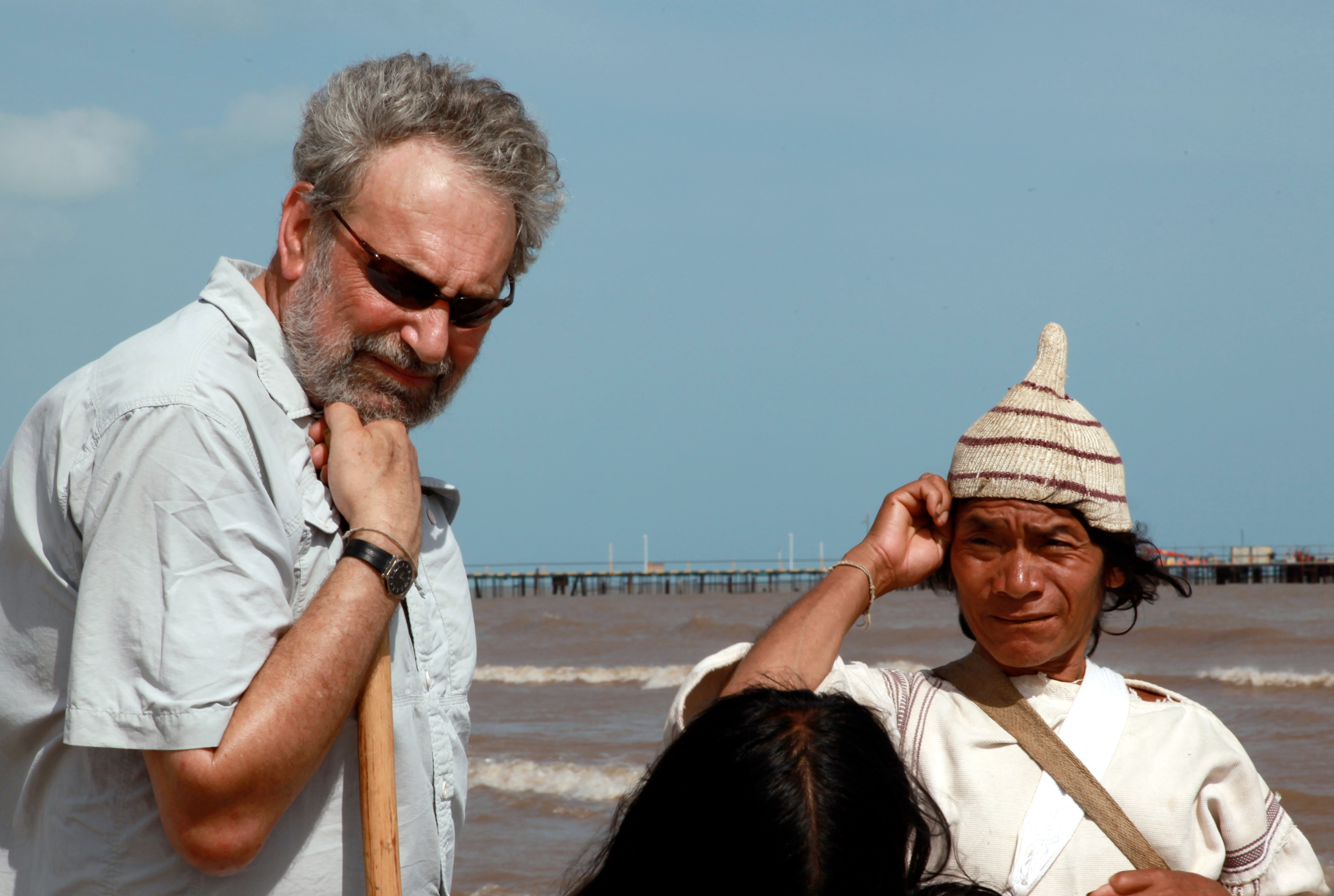
Alan Ereira'and Mama Shibulata during filming production of Aluna

Originally the budget was set at £270,000. Alan Ereira got Bruce Parry interested in the project and Parry met with the Kogi, who agreed to the project. With Parry involved, the BBC offered £180,000 and Indus Films offered a further £20,000. However, when Bruce Parry became 'committed to another project', the offer of funding from the BBC was withdrawn. Therefore, Alan Ereira had to seek alternative funding. Some of this funding came from the British charity The Onaway Trust, which also helped fund Ereira's book on the Kogis, The Heart of the World.

The Kogis had their own indigenous film crew, enabling the film to include previously unrecorded holy sites and practices that other film crews had been prohibited from seeing. Throughout the collaboration, the Kogis exercised their autonomy while the film's director, Alan Ereira, looked forward to see what the indigenous crew had recorded. The Mamas took charge of what was going to be filmed and consulted Aluna through divinations.

The collaboration between the indigenous crew and the European camera crews enabled Alan Ereira to bring a camera operator and a sound recordist to work with their indigenous counterparts in Colombia.

== Participation in festivals ==
Aluna was chosen to be shown at the 2012 Sheffield International Documentary Festival where it would have its World premiere.
