= El Cartucho =

- Barrio
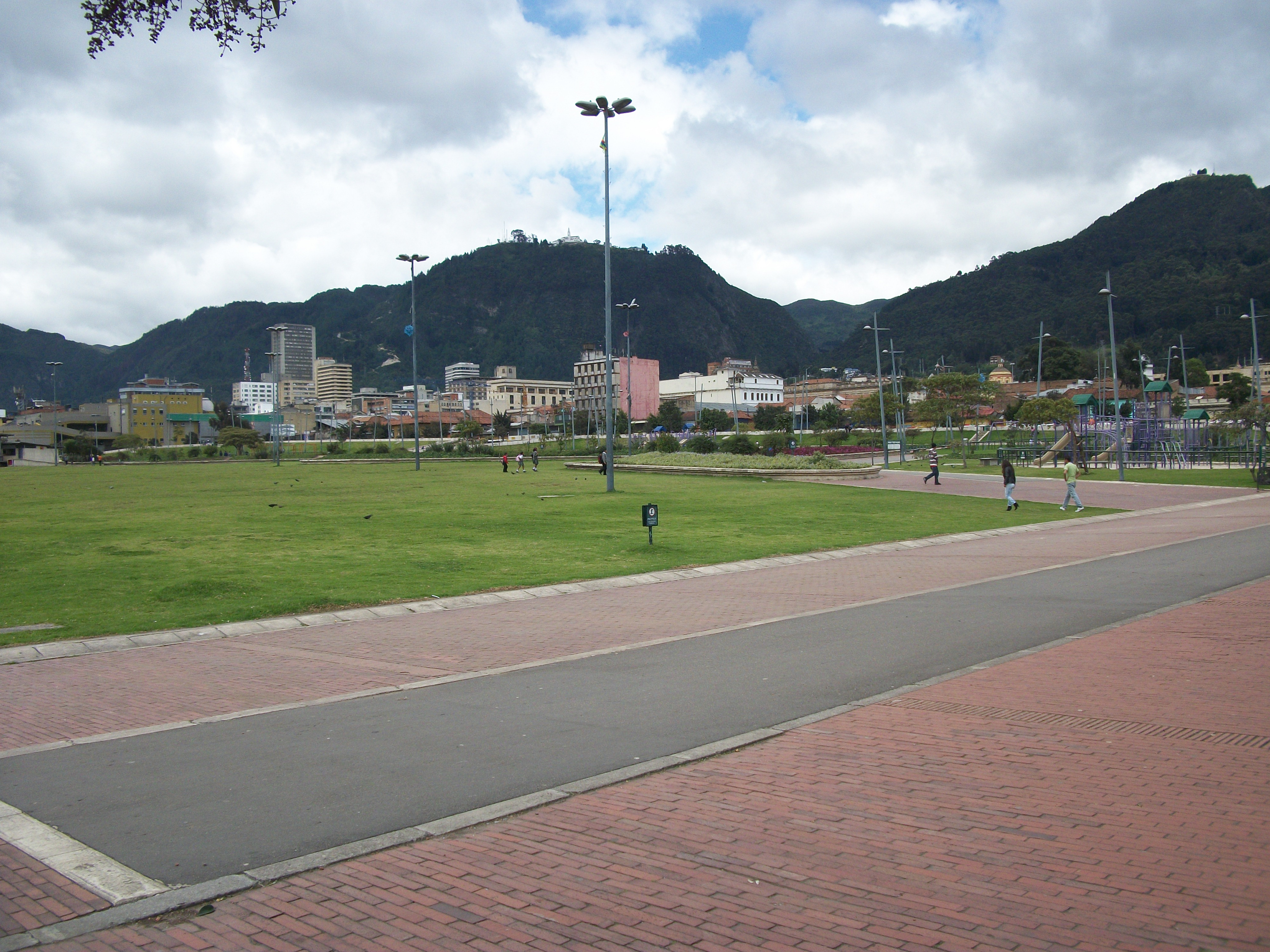
- Tercer Milenio Park currently where before was El Cartucho

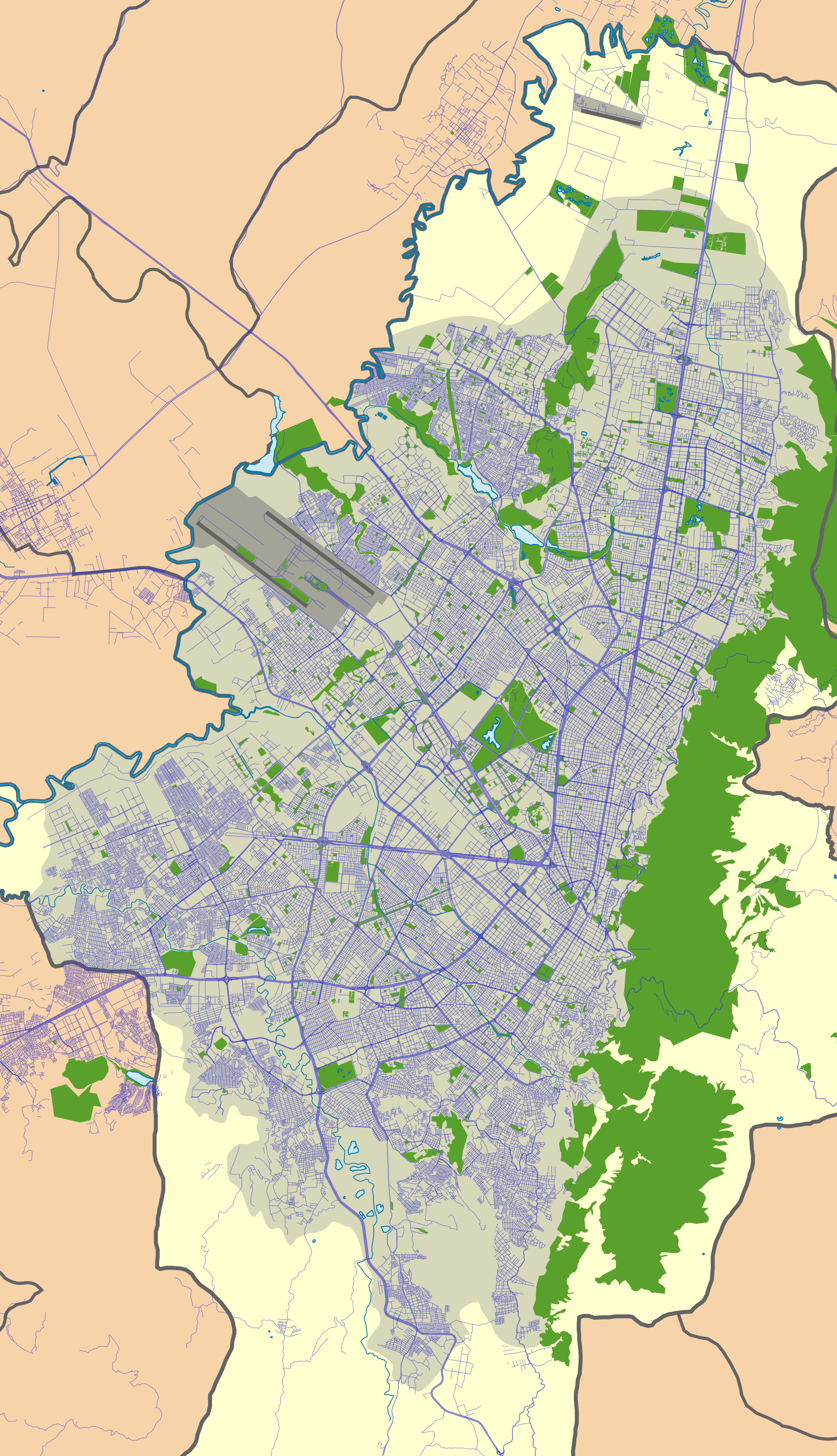
- Location in Bogota
- Coordinates: 4°35′51.396″N 74°04′52.955″W
- Country: Colombia
- Department: Distrital Capital Cundinamarca
- City: Bogotá
- Locality: Santa Fe

El Cartucho or Calle del Cartucho was a street in the neighborhood of Santa Inés in Bogota which was destroyed and replaced by a park. At its time, it was one of the poorest and most dangerous areas in Colombia, known for rampant drug trafficking and inhabited by the poverty stricken. El Cartucho was widely considered to be a symbol of urban degradation.

== History ==
Originally located on the 9th and 10th streets of Bogota between carreras 13 and 13A, the area expanded over the years to occupy most of the neighborhood of Santa Inés. The name El Cartucho had been used for this area since the mid 20th century due to its proximity to an open-air market dedicated to reclaiming materials such as bottles, cardboard, and construction material (collective called "cartucho" in Colombian Spanish). after the events of El Bogotazo, the neighborhood experienced a time of rapid decay during which much of its inhabitants moved to nearby neighborhoods. In their place, the area was populated by those displaced by drug trafficking related violence, often the city's poorest persons. The majority of the area's decay is attributed to the demolition of the market and the church of Santa Inés on carrera 10th.

In the decade of the 1980s, the neighborhood began to be gradually invaded by drug traffickers, the destitute, sex-workers, and criminals. This converted the area into the most dangerous neighborhood of the city. Murder, drug trafficking, mutilations, and other crimes became commonplace, aided by the absence of police in the neighborhood. By the 1990s, the area was widely considered to be irrecoverable.

Urban legend states that in one point, El Cartucho got so bad, a crocodile was somehow brought in, and stored in a hollowed-out basement in one of the homes that was turned into a makeshift enclosure, and named Pepe. Pepe was fed with human remains of those who died due to drug overdose, or those murdered in the area.

During the late 1990s, during the government of Enrique Peñalosa, it was decided to reclaim the area, along with other violent neighborhoods in the city, and to demolish the entire neighborhood in order to be replaced with the Tercer Milenio Park. Despite the protesting of the decision, and the lack of plans for relocation of the poor inhabitants of the neighborhood, the plan moved ahead. The park was inaugurated in the year 2000.

The famous documentary film Orozco the Embalmer was filmed in this neighborhood in the 1990s.

=== Legacy ===
The name Cartucho has been generalized to refer to any zone of extreme urban decay, particularly those rife with crime and drug violence. Due to the destruction of El Cartucho, the illicit drug activities which were once conducted in the area have moved to adjacent neighborhoods, although in a reduced capacity. It is estimated that the adjacent area known as El Bronx is the source for up to 90% of the city's drugs. The neighborhood to the south of the park known as San Bernardo is also a location of drug trafficking.

== See also ==
- History of Bogotá
- Illegal drug trade in Colombia
