= Crusades (TV series) =

- Also known as: Terry Jones' Crusades
- Genre: Documentary
- Written by: Alan Ereira; Terry Jones
- Directed by: Alan Ereira; David Wallace
- Presented by: Terry Jones
- Composer: José Nieto
- Country of origin: United Kingdom
- Original language: English
- No. of seasons: 1
- No. of episodes: 4

Original release
- Network: BBC2
- Release: 10 January – 31 January 1995

Related
- Terry Jones' Medieval Lives

Crusades is a 1995 historical documentary series presented by Terry Jones. It looked at The Crusades and occasionally used elements of black comedy. Prominent historical figures are depicted by actors wearing masks and costumes, which give the appearance of living artistic images in the style of their original cultures. Emperor Alexios I, for example, appears as a Byzantine mosaic, and European and Muslim figures are brought to life by actors appearing in the style of medieval European and Near Eastern miniatures. At times, production is deliberately anachronistic such as the use of 1930s-style newsreels being shown by the Church to drum up mass support for the Crusades.

== Episodes ==
=== 1. "Pilgrims in Arms" ===
The first episode recounts Byzantine Emperor Alexius's appeal to Pope Urban II for military aid to fight Muslim Turks. The Pope uses the request to drum up popular support for the creation of a Christian army with the mission of liberating Jerusalem. European knights, who recently converted to Christianity, eagerly join the Crusade. The crusader army is preceded by the People's Crusade, a mass migration incited to go to Jerusalem by Peter the Hermit. Recounted are massacres of Jews in Worms and Cologne. The People's Crusade is crushed by Turks after the catastrophic Siege of Xerigordos and the Battle of Civetot. Kilij Arslan I, the Seljuq Sultan, emboldened by the quick end of the People's Crusade, underestimates the crusader army when it appears and so he suffers defeat against them. The crusaders, having won the early battle, confidently set off for Jerusalem. The episode ends with host Terry Jones being on the road and wearing the gear of a Crusader. He reveals that despite the crusaders' confidence that they would soon be in Jerusalem, they will have many hardships to overcome.

=== 2. "Jerusalem" ===
The second episode covers the hardships encountered by crusaders as they neared the Holy City, including the intense heat and starvation. Also, the Siege of Antioch and the Turkish retaliation are shown.

=== 3. "Jihad" ===
The third episode chronicles the response that the Arab world gave to the gains of the Crusades. Jones takes the viewer from Syria to Jordan to shed light on the Arabs counter-crusade led by the Muslim leader Saladin. Additionally, experts detail the political intrigue behind Saladin's rise to power as he tried to lead Muslims in winning back Jerusalem from the Christians.

=== 4. "Destruction" ===
The Crusade of Richard I of England is explored to find the seeds of his eventual failure. The fourth episode examines the massacres during the siege of Acre, the 1192 Treaty of Ramla in which Richard was forced to concede Jerusalem to Saladin, and the establishment of the Empire of Latins in Constantinople after the Crusade of the Venetian statesman Enrico Dandolo.

== Controversy ==
A number of distinguished Crusade historians appear and give their views on events. The documentary followed the outdated perspective established by Steven Runciman in A History of the Crusades, which casts the Crusades in a negative light. Because the historians did not support this narrative, the producers edited the taped interviews so that the historians seemed agree with Runciman. Professor Jonathan Riley-Smith accused the producers that "they made me appear to say things that I do not believe!"
