= Alan Ereira =

British author

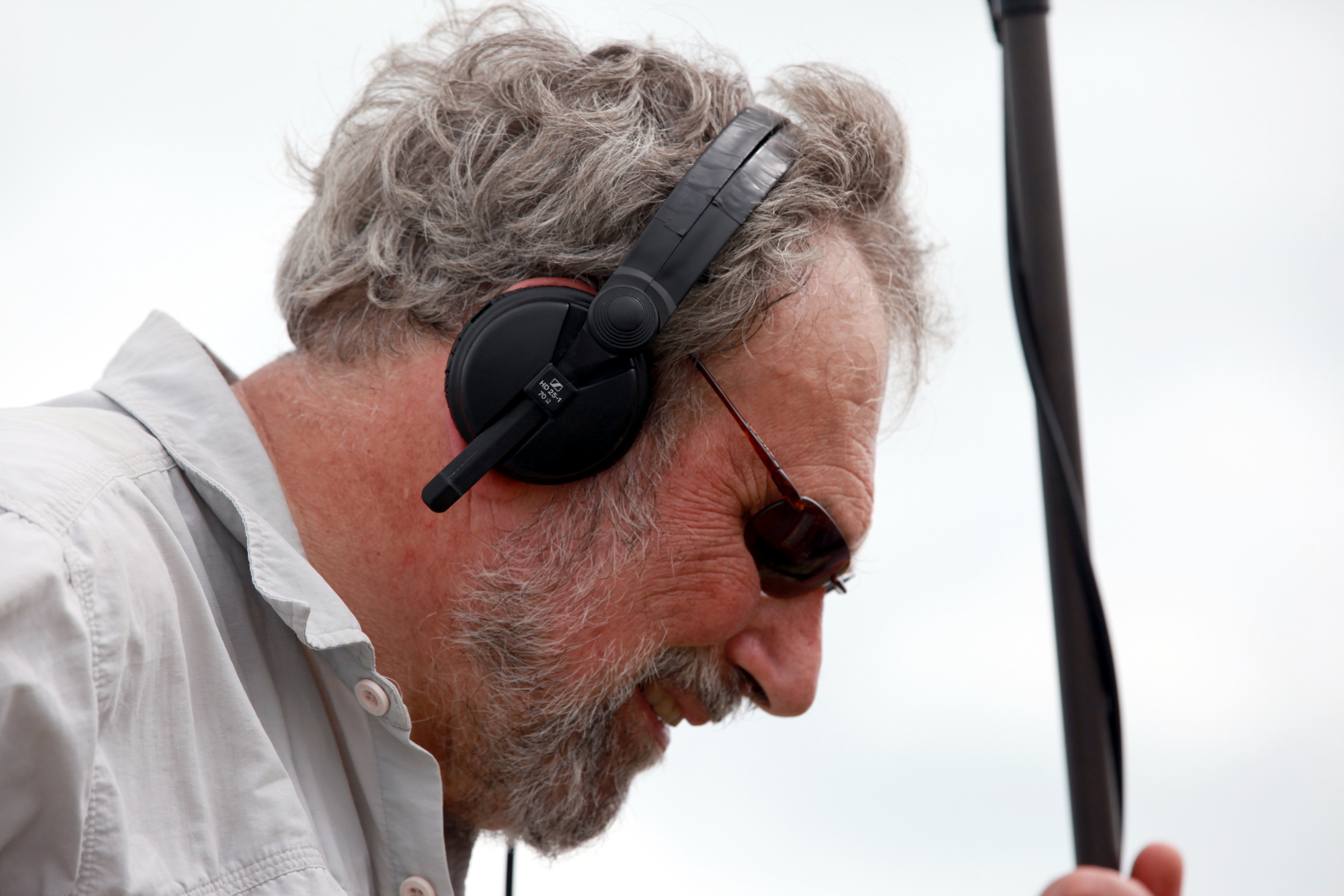
- Ereira in 2011
- Born: Alan David Patrick Ereira; Kilburn, London, Middlesex, England, U.K.
- Occupations: Film director, film producer, author, historian
- Years active: 1965–present
- Agent: David Godwin Associates
- Notable work: Crusades, Terry Jones' Medieval Lives, Terry Jones' Barbarians, Aluna
- Website: alanereira.co.uk

Alan Ereira is a British author, historian and documentary filmmaker. He was a Professor of Practice at the University of Wales, Trinity St. David.

== Life ==
Educated at Kilburn Grammar School and at Queens' College, Cambridge (1962–1965), where he played a leading role in The Bats, the college dramatic society, Ereira subsequently worked at the BBC on television and radio, contributing documentaries to the Timewatch strand amongst others.

He was awarded the Japan Prize for his 1978 documentary on the Battle of the Somme, and the Royal Television Society Best Documentary Series award for his 1988 documentary on the Armada.

Ereira directed a documentary called From the Heart of the World – The Elder Brother's Warning (1990) for the British Broadcasting Corporation. In this film he documented his unique visits to the Kogi people of Colombia, an indigenous ('Indian') ethnic group which survived attempts by the Spanish conquerors to destroy them by retreating high up into the mountainous area of the Sierra Nevada, where they now live. These meetings were only allowed by the Kogi Mamos who normally restrict any direct interaction with the modern world. In Ereira's case, the Mamos made an exception as they saw him as the filmmaker they wanted to convey their message to the world.

Ereira regards the Kogi as unique amongst indigenous peoples in the Americas in that they have managed to retain their traditional culture almost entirely intact. Since the 1980s, the Kogi have warned, on the basis of their observation of ecological changes in the Sierra Nevada, that the world is facing an ecological catastrophe. They asked Ereira to make his films about them to warn the rest of the world (and particularly the West) that it needs to radically change its way of living, and its exploitative attitude to the natural world, if it is to avert this catastrophe. Ereira later wrote about the filming of the documentary in his book The Heart of the World (1990). This book has been republished and retitled as The Elder Brothers (1992) and The Elder Brothers' Warning (2009).

Aluna is the sequel documentary to The Heart of the World: Elder Brother's Warning and was made by an indigenous film crew and the Kogi Mamos in collaboration with Ereira. This is to be the final warning to the world by the Kogi Mamos, as it is apparent to them that the world did not heed their original warning in the first documentary. Ereira collaborated with Terry Jones on the documentary series Crusades (1995), Terry Jones' Medieval Lives (2004) and Terry Jones' Barbarians (2006), with whom he also co-authored the respective companion books.

In 2004 he also presented, wrote and produced a 6-part documentary series on the kings and queens of England for UKTV History.

== Filmography ==
- 1988 Armada producer, writer & narrator
- 1990 From the Heart of the World: The Elder Brothers' Warning producer, director, & writer
- 1995 Crusades producer, director & writer
- 2004 Terry Jones' Medieval Lives associate producer & writer
- 2004 Kings and Queens of England producer, writer & presenter
- 2006 Terry Jones' Barbarians producer & writer
- 2012 Aluna producer & director

== Bibliography ==
- Ereira, Alan (1 March 1981). The People's England. Routledge & Kegan Paul (hardcover). ISBN 978-0-7100-0596-0.
- Ereira, Alan (15 September 1981). The Invergordon Mutiny. Routledge & Kegan Paul (hardcover). ISBN 978-1-1389-2757-5.
- Ereira, Alan (8 November 1990). The Heart of the World. Jonathan Cape (hardcover). ISBN 978-0-224-02908-7.
- Ereira, Alan (8 November 1990). The Heart of the World. Jonathan Cape (hardcover). ISBN 978-0-224-02908-7.
- Ereira, Alan (6 February 1992). The Heart of the World. Jonathan Cape (paperback). ISBN 978-0-224-02908-7.
- Ereira, Alan (1 December 1993). The Elder Brothers. Vintage Books (paperback). ISBN 978-0-679-74336-1.
- Jones, Terry & Alan Ereira (27 October 1994). The Crusades. BBC Books (hardcover). ISBN 978-0-563-37007-9.
- Jones, Terry & Alan Ereira (25 July 1996). The Crusades. BBC Books (paperback). ISBN 978-0-14-025745-8.
- Jones, Terry & Alan Ereira (5 February 2004). Terry Jones' Medieval Lives. BBC Books (hardcover). ISBN 978-0-563-48793-7.
- Jones, Terry & Alan Ereira (5 May 2005). Terry Jones' Medieval Lives. BBC Books (paperback). ISBN 978-0-563-52275-1.
- Jones, Terry & Alan Ereira (1 June 2006). Terry Jones' Barbarians. BBC Books (hardcover). ISBN 978-0-563-49318-1.
- Jones, Terry & Alan Ereira (7 June 2007). Terry Jones' Barbarians. BBC Books (paperback). ISBN 978-0-563-53916-2.
- Ereira, Alan (17 August 2016). The Nine Lives of John Ogilby. Duckworth Overlook (hardcover). ISBN 978-0-7156-5110-0.
