= Apaporis (film) =

2010 film

- Theatrical release poster
- Directed by: Antonio Dorado
- Produced by: Antonio Dorado; Juan Carlos Paredes; Omar Dorado
- Cinematography: Mauricio Vidal
- Edited by: Mauricio Vergara
- Music by: Alejandro Ramírez
- Production company: Fundacion Imagen Latina
- Release date: July 30, 2010
- Running time: 72 minutes
- Country: Colombia
- Languages: English; Spanish

Apaporis (also known as Apaporis, en busca del río, Apaporis: In Search of One River or simply In Search of One River) is a Colombian documentary film directed by Antonio Dorado. The movie was produced by Antonio Dorado, Juan Carlos Paredes and Omar Dorado. It opened theatrically in New York City on July 30, 2010 and opens in Los Angeles on August 6, 2010 at the 14th Annual DocuWeeks.
