= Orozco the Embalmer =

2001 Spanish-language documentary film

- English-language DVD cover
- Directed by: Kiyotaka Tsurisaki
- Written by: Kiyotaka Tsurisaki
- Starring: Froilan Orozco
- Production companies: Orozco Productions; V&R Planning
- Release date: 2001
- Running time: 91 minutes
- Countries: Colombia, Japan
- Language: Spanish

Orozco the Embalmer (Spanish: Orozco el embalsamador) is a 2001 Spanish-language mondo film directed by Kiyotaka Tsurisaki. It follows a Colombian embalmer named Froilán Orozco Duarte, who is shown living in El Cartucho, an impoverished and crime-ridden area of Bogotá, Colombia, where the homicide rate is high and corpses can be seen on the streets.

The film comprises footage taken over a period of several years, documenting in a graphic cinéma vérité manner Orozco's embalming of corpses. Orozco died during the production of the film.
