= Kiyotaka Tsurisaki =

Japanese photographer (born 1966)

Kiyotaka Tsurisaki (釣崎 清隆, born 1966 in Toyama Prefecture) is a Japanese photographer who specializes in photographing dead bodies. He directed the documentary Orozco The Embalmer.

After graduation from Keio University, he worked as an adult video director and became a dead body photographer in 1994. He has taken pictures in Thailand, Colombia, Russia, Palestine, India, Mexico, Ukraine, Japan, Brazil, Philippines, Israel, France and elsewhere.

== Publications ==
=== Books ===
- Sekaizankokukikou SHITAI NI ME GA KURANDE (死体に目が眩んで―世界残酷紀行, 2000)
- Fight Review (ファイト批評, 2005)

=== Photobook ===
- danse macabre to the HARDCORE WORKS (1996)

=== Videos ===
- Junk film/Tsurisaki Kiyotaka tanpen shu (ジャンクフィルム/釣崎清隆残酷短編集, 2007)
- Shigeshoshi Orozco (死化粧師オロスコ, 2008)
