= Yves Billon =

French film director

Yves Billon (born 9 July 1946, in Paris) is a French documentary film-maker. He is also founder of the production companies Les Films du Village and Zaradoc.

The documentaries Religious and Sufi Music of Pakistan and The Music of Balochistan that he produced with a Pakistani ethnomusicologist Adam Nayyar also won silver medal at the Florence Film. Yves Billon made a 52-minute documentary in 1992 in English/French on the music of Bismillah Khan and showed him as one of the greatest shehnai players who changed the status of shehnai from a common court instrument to that of a classical solo instrument. The film was set along the banks of Ganges, in the mystical Varanasi.The day the shehnai died. Aijaz Gul Festival

== Credits ==
- Far from Fidel, Director
- De sol a sol, Screenplay
- La Guerre de pacification en Amazonie, Director & Producer
- Chronique du temps Sec, Director & Producer
- De sol a sol, Director & Producer
- Ali Farka Toure: Ca coule de source, Director, Producer & Screenplay
- Benares, musique du Gange, Director
