= Kogi people =

Indigenous Chibchan ethnic group of northern Colombia

Kogi Kágaba
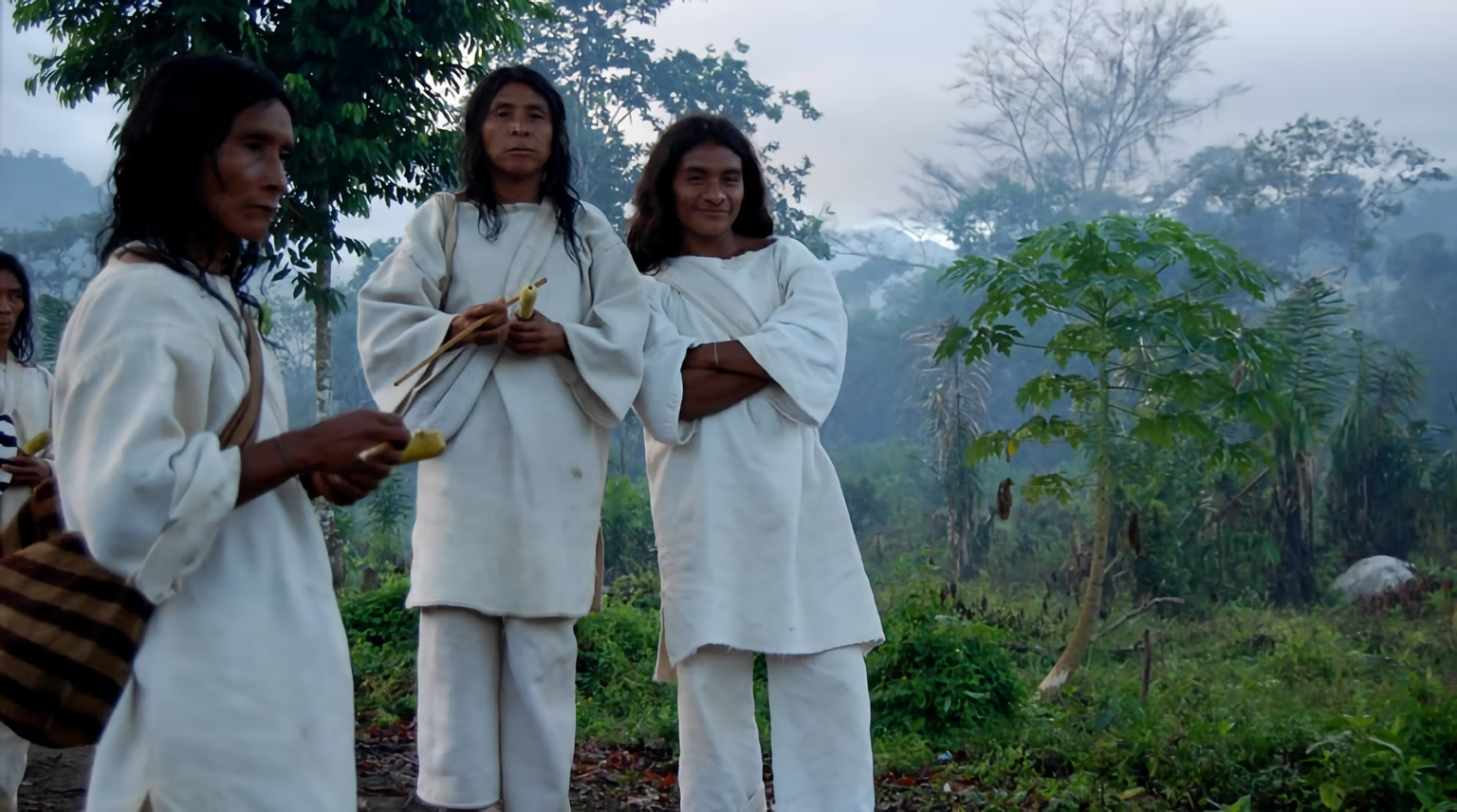
- Kogi men with poporos

Total population
- 15,820 (2018)

Regions with significant populations
- Colombia (Sierra Nevada de Santa Marta)

Languages
- Kogi

Religion
- Traditional beliefs

Related ethnic groups
- Arhuaco, Sanha

The Kogi (/ˈkoʊɡi/ KOH-gee), or Cogui, or Kágaba, meaning "jaguar" in the Kogi language, are an Indigenous people of the Sierra Nevada de Santa Marta mountains in northern Colombia. Their culture has continued since the Pre-Columbian era, according to a scholarly position most represented by Gerardo Reichel-Dolmatoff, but which has been criticised for its essentialist elements and the indirect removal of centuries marked by contact and tensions within the Sierra Nevada de Santa Marta, as well as representing the Kogi as "noble eco-savages".

Politically, the modern-day Kogi (or Kágaba, as they call themselves) could be defined as a living theocratic chiefdom.

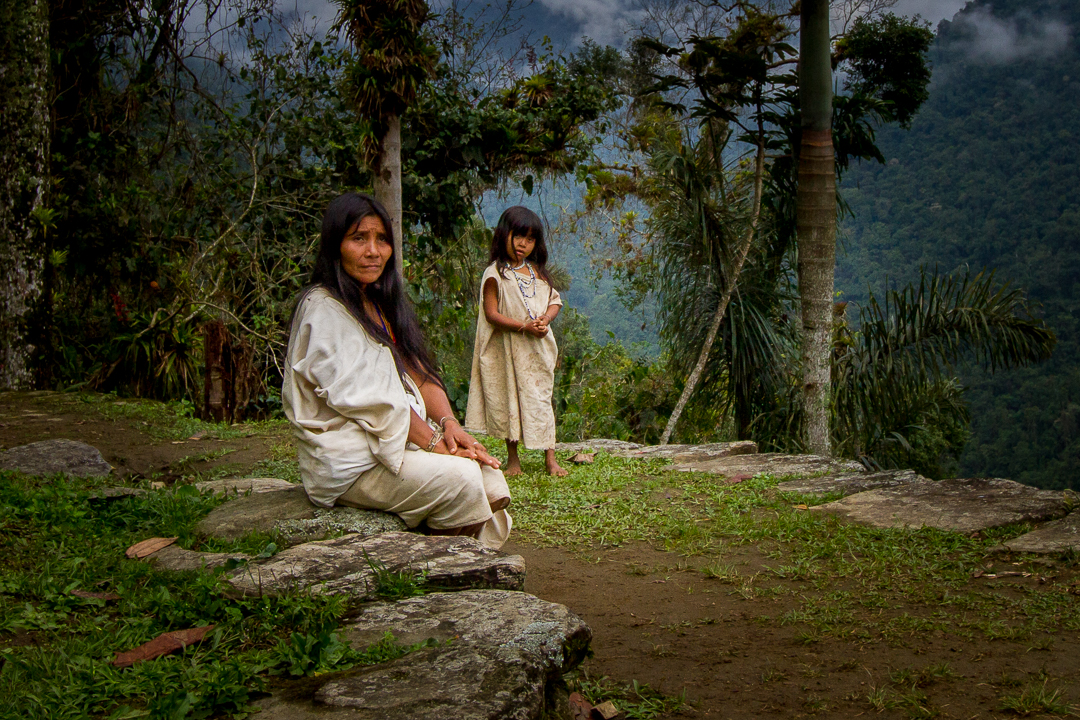
Kogi woman and child on one of the terraces at Ciudad Perdida, Colombia (2017)

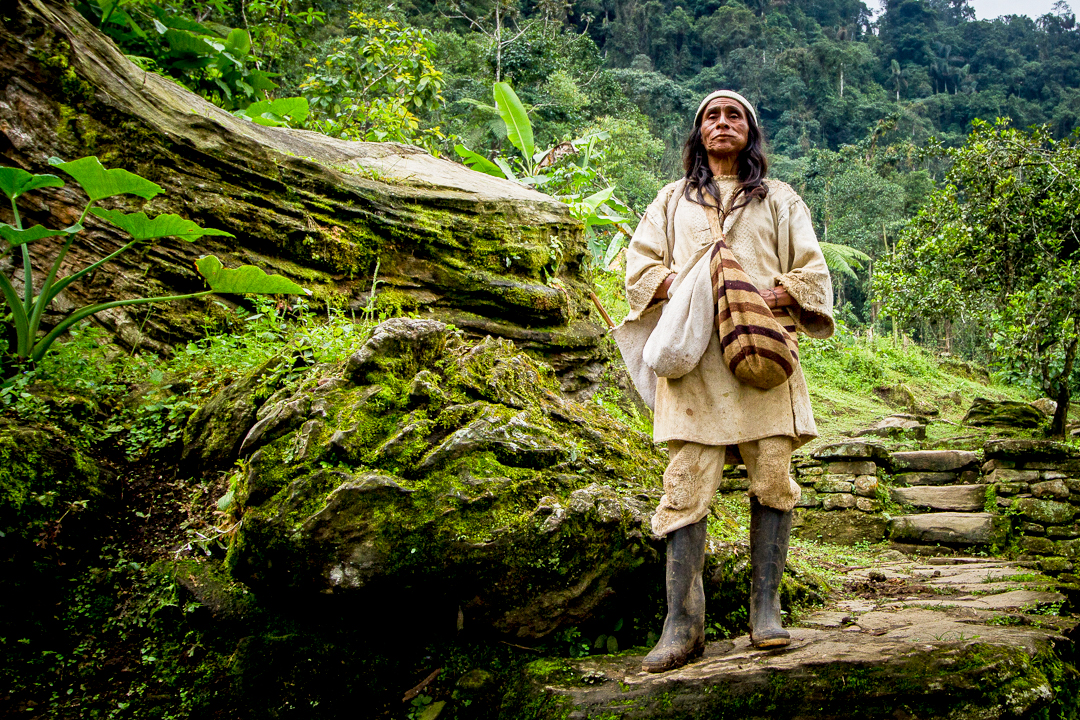
Kogi mamo at Ciudad Perdida, Colombia (2017)

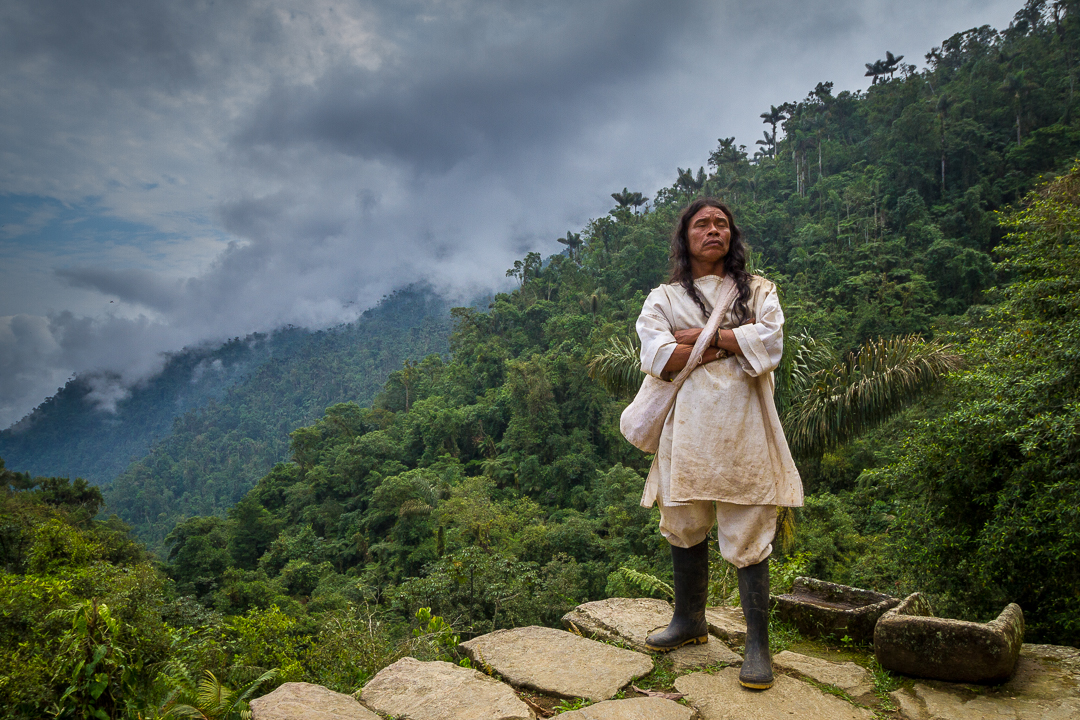
Kogi man on one of the terraces at Ciudad Perdida, Colombia (2017)

== Language ==
The Kogi language belongs to the Chibchan family and is closely related to the languages of other indigenous groups in the Sierra Nevada de Santa Marta, such as Arhuaco and Ika. It is primarily an oral language, though efforts have been made in recent decades to develop a writing system for educational purposes and cultural preservation.

Language transmission occurs mainly within families, and it is considered a crucial element of Kogi cultural identity. In addition to daily communication, the language is used in ritual contexts, teachings by the mamos, and in passing down traditional ecological knowledge, including agricultural practices and spiritual beliefs.

== History ==
The Kogi people are descendants of the Tairona culture, which flourished before the times of the Spanish conquest. The Tairona were an advanced civilization which built many stone structures and pathways in the jungles. They made many gold objects which they would hang from trees and around their necks. They lived similarly to modern-day Kogi. Before the Spanish conquistadors arrived, the Tairona were forced to move into the highlands when the Caribs invaded around 1000 CE. Their new area proved strategic when the Spanish entered in the 15th century.

Later, missionaries came and also began to influence their way of life, building chapels and churches amidst their villages to train and convert the locals. In the years since, the Kogi have remained in their home in the mountains, which allows them to escape the worst effects of colonisation and aids them in preserving their traditional way of life.

== Spiritual beliefs ==
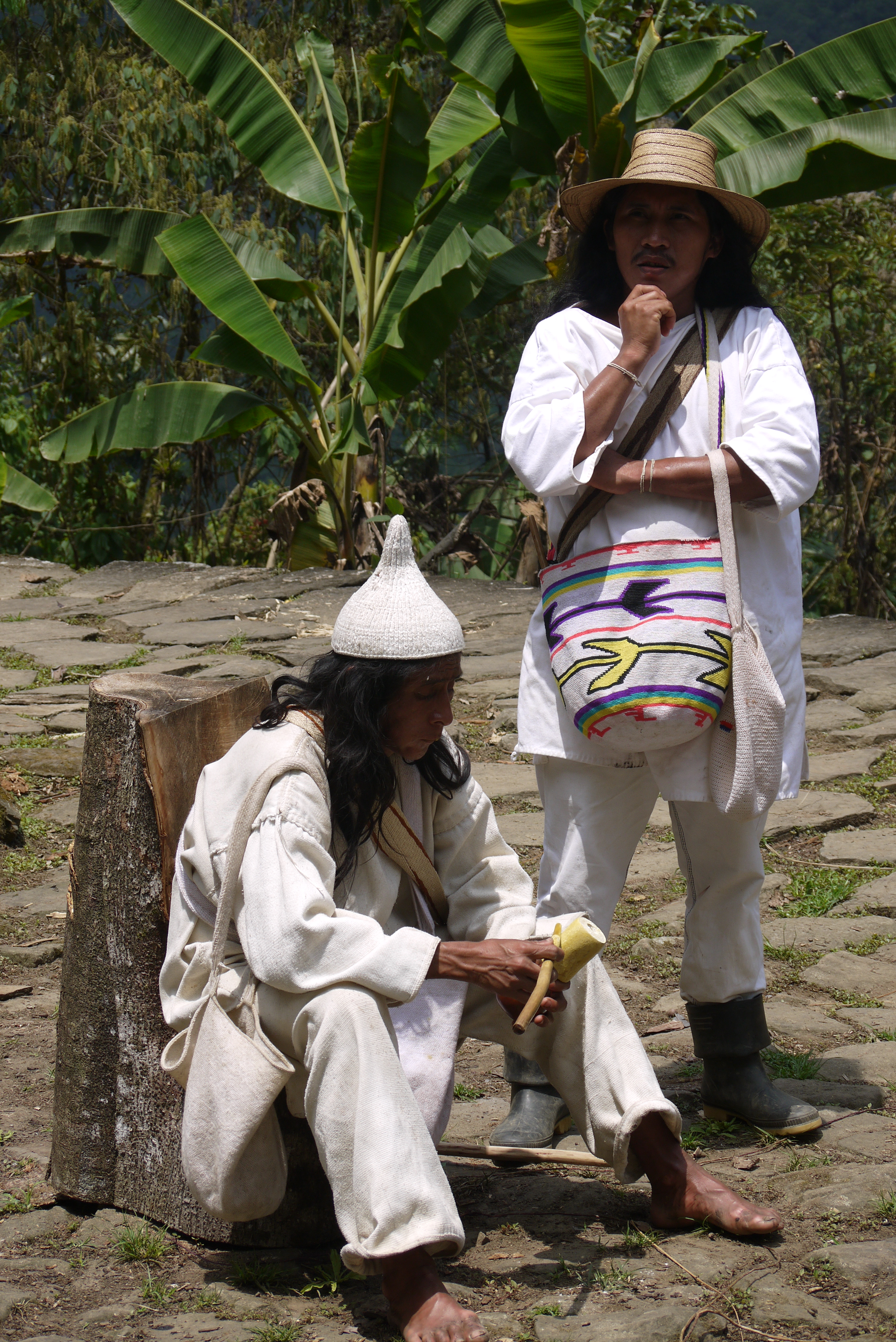
Kogi mamo (2014)

The Kogi base their lifestyles on their belief in "Aluna" or the thoughts of "The Great Mother", their creator figure, who they perceive as the force behind nature, prior to creating the universe. The "Mother" is called "Gaulčováng", and, beyond the creator-goddess having created the world in a primal sea based on a number of pre-existent images in her mind ("aluna"), versions diverge. The incestuous relationship between the "mother" and her son (Sintána), which gave way to sibling incest among their children, gave birth to humanity. The Kogi understand the Earth to be a living being, and see humanity as its "children." They say that our actions of exploitation, devastation, and plundering for resources is weakening "The Great Mother" and leading to our destruction.

Like many other Indigenous tribes, the Kogi honor a holy mountain which they call "Gonawindua," otherwise known as Pico Cristóbal Colón. They believe that this mountain is "The Heart of the World" and they are the "Elder Brothers" who care for it. They also say that the outside civilization is the "Younger Brothers" who were sent away from The Heart of the World long ago.

From birth the Kogi attune members of their society, called mamos ("suns") or mamás, for guidance, healing, and leadership. The mamos are tribal priests, highly respected in Kogi society, and are not shamans or curers. To assume this role, Mamos undergo strict training from childhood, starting at least before the age of 5. It takes place in isolated, high-altitude places of a few houses or caves. Elder mamas care for, feed, train, and teach the child to attune to their thought before the boy enters the outside world. During training, the two or three novices (kuívi: "abstinent ones") are trained to overcome the dates and cycles that decide events, through abstinence in sexuality, food consumption, sleep and nightlife.

Through deep concentration, symbolic offerings, and divination, the mamos believe they support the balance of harmony and creativity in the world. It is also in this realm that the essence of agriculture is nurtured: seeds are blessed in Aluna before being planted, to ensure they grow successfully; marriage is blessed to ensure fertility; and ceremonies are offered to the various spirits of the natural world before tasks such as harvest and hut building.

Since the Spanish Conquistadors, mamos have remained isolated from the rest of the world. In order to preserve their traditional way of life, they rarely interact with the modern world or with outside civilization. Outsiders are not allowed in their ancestral lands. Only men may interact with outsiders. Mamos say that the balance of the earth's ecology has been suffering due to modern-day devastation of resources by Younger Brother. Mamos in turn believe that their work as Elder Brother is instrumental for prolonging and protecting life on earth.

To prevent further ecological catastrophe and destruction, the mamos broke their silence and allowed a small BBC film crew into their isolated mountaintop civilization to hear their message and warning to Younger Brother. The subsequent messages and warnings were voiced in the documentary From the Heart of The World - The Elder Brother's Warning on YouTube. After the documentary was filmed, the mamos returned to their work in isolation and asked outsiders not to come to their land.

The Kogi soon realized that their warning had not been heeded by Younger Brother, and instead, as they had predicted, many catastrophes occurred and the natural world continued to be devastated even more rapidly. 20 years later, they contacted the same filmmaker to give one final message. They made a documentary film called Aluna, where they give a second warning and say that they have chosen to share their secret sciences with Younger Brother so that Younger Brother can help change the world for the better.

=== Cosmology and socio-religious concepts ===
Traditional Kogi religion is closely related to the structure of the cosmos that exists in dualistic expressions. The sun separates the universe into two hemispheres: the east/west and consequently a right/left. The Kogi use this dualistic notion to elaborate on a number of earthly divides: man/woman, male/female, heat/cold, light/dark, and right/left. Each of these groupings are complementary opposites. Within each pair, one cannot survive without the other. In the case of good(right)/evil(left), the Kogi believe committing a sin once in a while serves as a justification for the existence of good. These natural opposites are a way to keep the society balanced or "in agreement" (yuluka).

The two hemispheres are then divided into four segments: North/South/East/West. Within these four points of reference, the Kogi have associated the orientation of their religious framework into South/East as good/light and North/West as evil/dark. This cosmic structure has influenced four entrances to each village, four principal clans, and has divided the Sierra Nevada into four sections. Following this concept, the Kogi have structured the ceremonial houses and sacred offering sites into four quadrants. In the ceremonial house, a line is drawn down the middle of a circle, which divides the men into a left side where men "know more", and a complementary right side of men who "know less".

The four lines separating the four quadrants meet in the center, creating a fifth dimension to the cosmic universe. The central point holds great significance to the Kogi. It represents the center of the universe, the Sierra Nevada de Santa Marta. During the ceremony, this is the point where the mamo buries the four sacred offerings and "speaks with god". In the center of the circle, he places a tiny stool upon the spot where he receives and answers questions of the cosmic universe.

In Kogi cosmology, they have added three dimensions to the standard N/S/E/W: Zenith, Nadir and the Center. This fixed system of points resembles an egg, and is formulated into nine stages/layers of development. Mother Goddess, the creator of the universe and humankind, created the cosmic egg. The horizontal layers of the egg are divided into two sections of four worlds with humankind (the 5th layer) residing in the center. The cosmic egg also represents the uterus of Mother Goddess and the Sierra Nevada. Because of this, the Kogi have built the structure of the ceremonial house as a replica of the cosmos.

=== Funerary customs ===
The Mamos participate in various rituals to celebrate the individual's life cycle from birth to death. These ceremonies include offerings, dances, and other ritual affairs. Although every life cycle is celebrated, emphasis on burial customs has been of much importance to the Kogi people. In this tribe, death is not viewed as a tragic event but as a "fulfillment of life". The burial process usually lasts approximately two hours and is performed without prayers and chants. To an outside viewer, the ritual might seem simple or without depth for such a spiritual tribe. However, these funerary customs have philosophic concepts and deeper meanings beyond the dimension of the western world.

Burial rites are an act of "cosmification". When a person dies, the Mamos return him/her back to the uterus of Mother Goddess.

The list below dictates eight components of the burial ritual analyzed by anthropologist Gerardo Reichel-Dolmatoff.

1. Verbalization of the cemetery as the "village of Death" and as the "ceremonial house of Death"; verbalization of the burial pit as a "house" and as a "uterus".
2. Flexed position of the corpse, placed in a carrying net, with a rope tied to the hair.
  - The net represents the placenta of the uterus, which is connected by an umbilical cord (rope) that is cut after nine days. This allows the person to be reborn into another world.
3. Corpse resting on the left side and with the head pointing east.
  - East is the direction of the sun and light of the universe.
4. Marked emphasis on right and left: position of hands; position of the corpse; left turns and right turns.
  - As the person is turned, it creates the movement of the cosmic axis.
5. Placing of offerings at the sides, the center and the top of the burial pit.
  - This placement relates to the sacred points: North/South/East/West/Zenith/Nadir/Center
6. Verbalization of the offerings as "food for the dead".
  - The dead not only consist of ancestors, but also mythical beings of the masters of plants and animals. Eating this offering has a close relationship with sexual intercourse. The food symbolizes male semen and also the fertilization of the supernatural being, and thus serves to multiply the offering. For example, if an offering is made to the Mother of Maize, the found constitutes as nourishment and an incentive to procreate more maize.
7. Attitude of "opening" and "closing the home".
8. Purification by turning.
  - By rapidly turning the corpse, one becomes invisible and invulnerable to Death. For nine days and nights, the soul wanders on a journey that ends in the rebirth of that soul.

== Traditions ==
The Kogi have many distinct traditions. For example, all Kogi men receive a poporo when they come of age. A poporo is a small, hollow gourd filled with lima ("lime"), a powder of heated and crushed shells. The men also continuously chew coca leaves, a tradition followed by many Indigenous tribes to connect them to the natural world. As they chew the leaves, they suck on the lime powder in their poporos, which they extract with a stick, and rub the mixture on the gourd with the stick to form a hardened layer or crust. The size of this layer depends on the man's maturity and age.

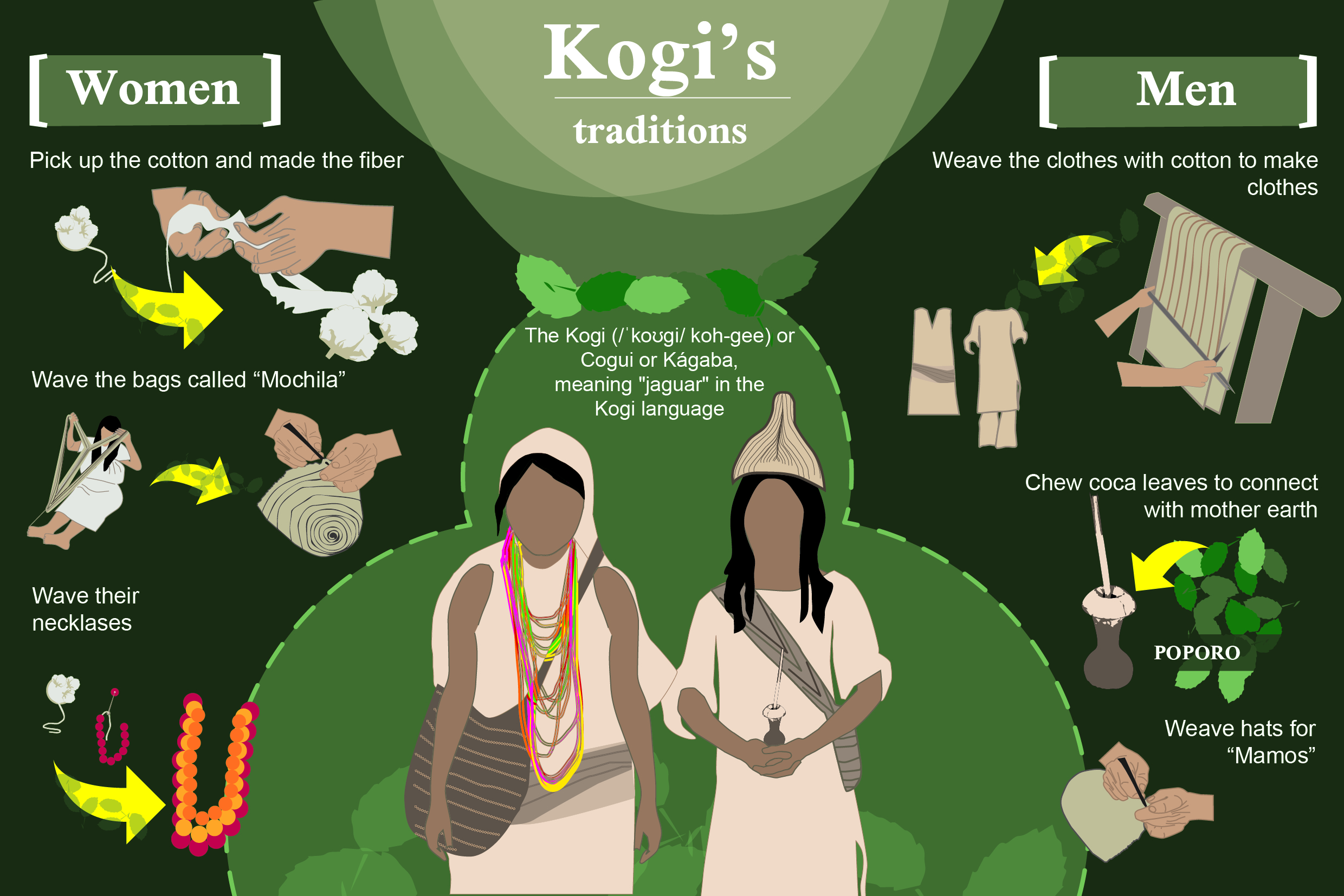
Differences between women and men in the Kogi culture are very important; they have specific roles that are fundamental to their traditions. This image shows their clothes and the typical objects that they use in their common daily life.

Kogi men and women all carry traditional bags across their shoulders. Only women are allowed to weave the bags. Many of the things carried inside a bag are secret and known only to the owner. Bags carried by Mamos contain sacred traditional objects. When two Kogi men meet, the customary greeting is to exchange handfuls of coca.

== Lifestyle ==
Kogi men and women alike have simple modes of dress. Women pick, card, and spin wool and cotton; men weave it into cloth. Men's clothing consists of a tunic and simple pants tied with a string at the waist. Women's clothing consists of a single length of cloth wrapped around their bodies as a dress. The Kogi all wear only pure white clothing. They say that white represents the Great Mother, and therefore the purity of nature.

The Kogi live in a series of villages, called Kuibolos, containing circular huts made of stone, mud, and palm leaves. Men live in a separate hut from the women and children. Each village contains a large hut called a nuhue ("temple") where only men are allowed. In the nuhue, many things are discussed and decisions are made. Divination and concentration also occur in these temples. Women are not allowed because the Kogi believe that women are more connected to the Great Mother and have no need of entering the temple. There are also women priests in the villages.

All consultations are done with mamos, and many of the decisions are based on their wisdom and knowledge. Many Kogi marriages are arranged by mamos to ensure fruitful communities. Marriages are not forced, and the buying or selling of women is not permitted, although women as young as 14 marry and bear children. The Kogi do not allow the mistreatment of women, and it is not uncommon to find marriages that were not arranged, but the Kogi also disapprove of breaking arranged marriages.

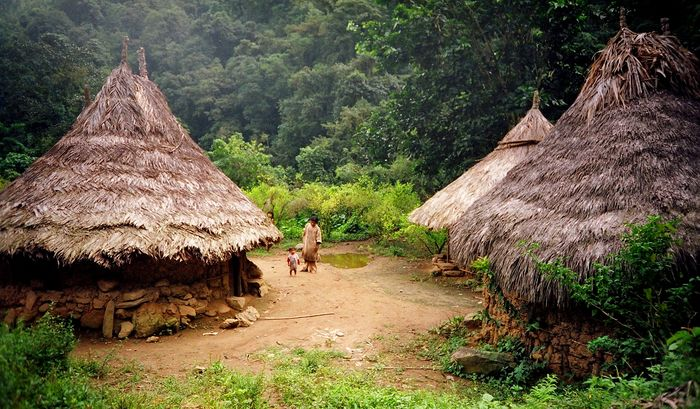
Kogi huts (2004)

Fields, houses, and livestock are passed from mother to daughter and from father to son, which is bilateral inheritance of these items. There is also the normal parallel descent of personal items, including ritual objects which are male property and descend patrilineally. But certain rights, names or associations descend matrilineally.

Common crops of trade are sugar and coffee. Much of the sugar is turned into "panela," a type of Colombian hardened brown sugar. The women do most of the planting of the vegetables, but farming is a responsibility of the whole family.

== Contemporary Kogi ==
The Kogi practice agriculture using slash-and-burn farming methods; each family tends farms at varying altitudes of the Sierra, producing a variety of crops to satisfy their needs. They also raise cattle on the highlands.

The Kogi starred in and helped film-director Alan Ereira make the 2012 documentary film Aluna, a sequel to the BBC 1990 documentary From the Heart of The World: Elder Brother's Warning, presented by Ereira himself. In it, they voice their concern to the people of the modern world (Younger Brother) about reckless ecosystem alteration and tomb desecration as a cause of climate change and world destruction.

== See also ==
- Arhuacos
- Juan Mayr
- Taironas
- Alan Ereira

== Bibliography ==
- Gómez, FFG (2013). "Learning and adaptation as conservation practices in resilient traditional socio-ecological systems: The Elder Brothers of Sierra Nevada de Santa Marta" (PDF). Revista de Tecnología. 12 (1): 99–109. Archived from the original (PDF) on 2016-03-04.
- Reichel-Dolmatoff, Gerardo (1978). "The Loom of Life: A Kogi Principle of Integration". Journal of Latin American Lore. 4 (1): 5–27.
- Reichel-Dolmatoff, Gerardo (1976). "Cosmology as Ecological Analysis: A View from the Rainforest". The Huxley Memorial Lecture. 11 (3): 307–318.
- Reichel-Dolmatoff, Gerardo (1971). Amazonian cosmos;: The sexual and religious symbolism of the Tukano Indians. Chicago: University of Chicago Press. ISBN 0226707318.
