= Kogi language =

Chibchan language spoken in Colombia

Kogi
- Kággaba
- Native to: Colombia
- Region: Sierra Nevada de Santa Marta
- Ethnicity: Kogi
- Native speakers: 9,900 (2004) nearly all monolingual
- Language family: Chibchan: Arwako–Chimila; Arwako; Kogi

Language codes
- ISO 639-3: kog
- Glottolog: cogu1240
- ELP: Cogui
- Linguasphere: 81-EDA-aa
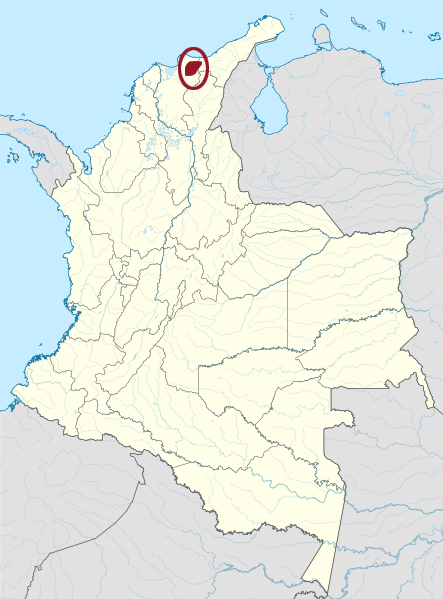

Kogi (Cogui), or Kagaba (Cágaba) (Cogui: Kággaba), is a Chibchan language of Colombia. It forms a separate Arwako branch along with the Iku and Damana languages. The Kogi people are almost entirely monolingual, and hold the virtually unique distinction of being a truly unconquered Amerindian civilization.

== Phonology ==
Vowels
	Front	Central	Back
Close	i ĩ	ɨ ɨ̃	u ũ
Mid	e ẽ	ʌ	o
Open		a ã	

- /e, ẽ/ can also be heard as [ɛ, ɛ̃] when in unstressed syllables.

Consonants
		Bilabial		Dental/Alveolar		Palatal	Velar		Glottal
		plain	geminated	plain	geminated	Palatal	plain	geminated	Glottal
Plosive	voiceless	p		t	tː		k	kː	ʔ
Plosive	voiced	b	bː	d	dː		g	gː	ʔ
Fricative	voiceless			s		ʃ ⟨sh⟩	x ⟨j⟩		h
Fricative	voiced			z		ʒ ⟨zh⟩			
Lateral				l					
Nasal		m		n			ŋ ⟨ñ⟩		
Approximant		w				j ⟨y⟩			

- Affricate sounds [ts, dz, tʃ, dʒ] are heard when sibilant sounds /s, z, ʃ, ʒ/ precede /n/. If /t, d/ precede /i/ then they are realized as affricates [tʃ, dʒ].
- /n/ before /i/ may be realized as a palatal [ɲ].

== Grammar ==
The language is mostly verb-final, with the dominant word order subject–object–verb. Adjectives follow the nouns they modify. Verbs are inflected for subject (either a prefix or a suffix) and for object (a prefix). Non-subject personal reference can also express a beneficiary, as illustrated in the following example:

bigíʒa na-k-lúni
pineapple 1O.SG-DAT-want
‘I want a pineapple.’

Nouns and nominals can receive case markers; however, the nominative or subject suffix -hã is not obligatory and cannot be attached to personal pronouns. Other four cases are: dative – alative (-k), accusative (-ø), genitive (-ti), locative (-li). Possession can be expressed either through a genitive construction or by using possessive prefixes. Possessive pronouns distinguish between inclusive and exclusive plural.
