= Fundación =

Place in Colombia, South America

- Municipality and town
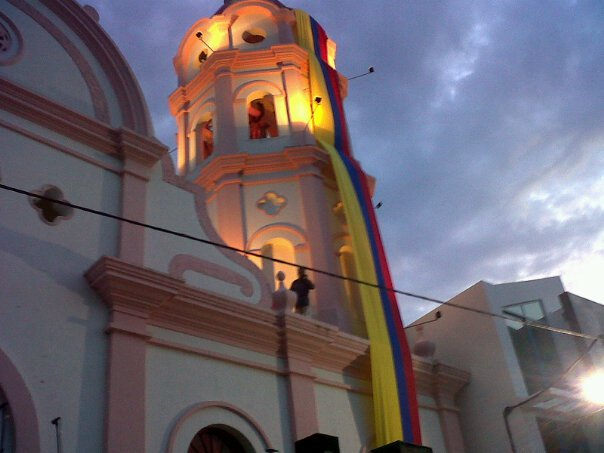

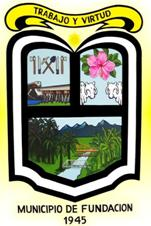
- Flag Coat of arms
- Nickname: Fundación Magdalena
- Location of the municipality and town of Fundación in the Department of Magdalena.

- Location within Colombia
- Coordinates: 10°31′14″N 74°11′12″W
- Country: Colombia
- Region: Caribbean
- Department: Magdalena
- Founded: 1902

Government
  - Mayor: Mallath Martinez

Area
  - Municipality and town: 971.9 km^{2} (375.3 sq mi)
  - Urban: 7.37 km^{2} (2.85 sq mi)
- Elevation: 10 m (33 ft)

Population (2018 census)
  - Municipality and town: 66,433
  - Density: 68.35/km^{2} (177.0/sq mi)
  - Urban: 56,814
  - Urban density: 7,710/km^{2} (20,000/sq mi)
- Demonym: Fundanese
- Time zone: UTC-5
- Area code: 57 +5
- Website: Official website (in Spanish)

Fundación is a town and municipality of the Colombian Department of Magdalena. Its people are known as Fundanenses. The primary economic activity is livestock-raising, for production of both meat and milk. Other crops are: corn, yuca, oranges, bananas, beans, sesame, sorghum, rice, tomatoes, and tobacco. There is also artisanal fishing.

Physically, the area of Fundación consists of river valley, flood plain, and some low-lying hills. The municipio is bounded on the north by Aracataca, on the east by Bosconia, on the south by Chibolo, and on the west by Pivijay, Sabanas de San Angel, and Algarrobo. The town is crossed by the Fundación River.

The town came to international prominence on 18 May 2014 when a school bus caught fire at the local Pentecostal Church. Thirty two children who had just attended a church service died in the fire.

- Population: 66,433 (municipality)
- Elevation: 45 meters
- Area: 971.9 km². (municipality)

== Points of interest ==
- Bridge over the Fundación River
- Chapel of the Holy Family College
- Church of Our Lord of Miracles
- Church of Maria Auxiliadora
- Fountain of the Barrio Vera Judith
- Los Varones Park

== Climate ==
Climate data for Fundación/El Retén (Zacapa), elevation 30 m (98 ft), (1971–2000)
Month	Jan	Feb	Mar	Apr	May	Jun	Jul	Aug	Sep	Oct	Nov	Dec	Year
Mean daily maximum °C (°F)	33.8 (92.8)	33.9 (93.0)	34.1 (93.4)	34.4 (93.9)	34.2 (93.6)	34.1 (93.4)	34.2 (93.6)	34.2 (93.6)	33.3 (91.9)	33.1 (91.6)	33.1 (91.6)	33.4 (92.1)	33.8 (92.8)
Daily mean °C (°F)	27.7 (81.9)	27.9 (82.2)	28.3 (82.9)	28.3 (82.9)	28.2 (82.8)	28.3 (82.9)	28.3 (82.9)	28.0 (82.4)	27.8 (82.0)	27.6 (81.7)	27.7 (81.9)	27.6 (81.7)	28.0 (82.4)
Mean daily minimum °C (°F)	20.9 (69.6)	20.9 (69.6)	21.5 (70.7)	21.9 (71.4)	22.2 (72.0)	22.3 (72.1)	22.3 (72.1)	22.2 (72.0)	22.0 (71.6)	22.0 (71.6)	21.9 (71.4)	21.4 (70.5)	21.8 (71.2)
Average precipitation mm (inches)	4.4 (0.17)	6.5 (0.26)	15.1 (0.59)	92.8 (3.65)	151.7 (5.97)	121.6 (4.79)	88.5 (3.48)	135.0 (5.31)	192.0 (7.56)	222.3 (8.75)	121.6 (4.79)	21.0 (0.83)	1,172.4 (46.16)
Average precipitation days	1	1	2	8	11	10	10	12	14	15	9	2	95
Average relative humidity (%)	81	81	80	81	82	83	82	82	82	83	83	84	82
Mean monthly sunshine hours	232.5	212.0	192.2	171.0	173.6	165.0	198.4	179.8	153.0	164.3	186.0	226.3	2,254.1
Mean daily sunshine hours	7.5	7.5	6.2	5.7	5.6	5.5	6.4	5.8	5.1	5.3	6.2	7.3	6.2
Source: Instituto de Hidrologia Meteorologia y Estudios Ambientales
