= Ariguaní =

Coordinates: 9.85°N 74.2386°W

- Flag

- Location of the municipality and town of Ariguaní in the Department of Magdalena.
- Country: Colombia
- Region: Caribbean
- Department: Magdalena
- Foundation: 25 December 1901

Government
  - Mayor: David Farelo Daza (2020-2023)

Population (2020 est.)
  - Total: 32,758
- Time zone: UTC-5
- Website: www.ariguani-magdalena.gov.co

Ariguaní (Spanish pronunciation: [aɾiɣwaˈni]) is a municipality of the Colombian Department of Magdalena. The municipality seat is the town of El Difícil. It is bordered by the municipalities of Nueva Granada, Sabanas de San Ángel, Pijiño and the Municipality of Bosconia (Department of Cesar). According to the last national census (2005), the population is 31,047 Ariguaní inhabitants, of whom 18,313 live in the urban center (El Difícil), and the remaining 12,734 live in rural areas (districts and villages).
