= Concordia, Magdalena =

Coordinates: 10.2667°N 74.8333°W

Concordia
- town
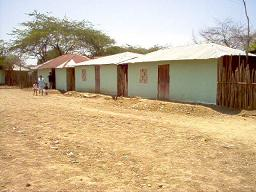

- Flag

- Location of the municipality and town of Concordia in the Department of Magdalena.
- Country: Colombia
- Region: Caribbean
- Department: Magdalena

Area
  - Total: 111 km^{2} (43 sq mi)

Population (Census 2018)
  - Total: 9,681
  - Density: 87.2/km^{2} (226/sq mi)
- Time zone: UTC-5
- Website: []

Concordia (Spanish pronunciation: [koŋˈkoɾðja]) is a town and municipality of the Magdalena Department in northern Colombia. Founded by Mandate 007 of June 24, 1999 with portion of territories from the municipalities of Cerro San Antonio and Pedraza.
