= Sabanas de San Ángel =

Coordinates: 10.0333°N 74.2167°W

- town
- Flag Coat of arms

- Location of the municipality and town of Sabanas de San Angel in the Department of Magdalena.
- Country: Colombia
- Region: Caribbean
- Department: Magdalena
- Foundation: circa 1607

Area
  - Total: 977 km^{2} (377 sq mi)

Population (Census 2018)
  - Total: 14,060
  - Density: 14.4/km^{2} (37.3/sq mi)
- Time zone: UTC-5
- Website: www.sabanasdesanangel-magdalena.gov.co

Sabanas de San Ángel (Spanish pronunciation: [saˈβanas ðe san ˈaŋxel]), Spanish for Savannas of Saint Angel, is a town and municipality of the Colombian Department of Magdalena. Founded around 1607 with the name San Antoñito by the Spanish Colonizers as a pathway town in the route between La Guajira Department and the Magdalena River. On June 24, 1999 the municipality is created with the name of Sabanas de San Angel that segregated from the municipalities of Ariguaní, Pivijay, Chibolo and Plato.

== Politics ==
=== Administrative divisions ===
Corregimientos and caseríos:

- Monterrubio
- Casa de Tabla
- La Horqueta
- Flores de Maria
- Pueblo de los Barrios
- San Roque
- Céspedes
- Pueblo Nuevo
- Estación Villa.
