= San Sebastián de Buenavista =

Coordinates: 9°14′25″N 74°21′20″W

- town
- Flag

- Location of the municipality and town of San Sebastián de Buenavista in the Department of Magdalena.
- Country: Colombia
- Region: Caribbean
- Department: Magdalena
- Foundation: 1748

Area
  - Total: 421 km^{2} (163 sq mi)

Population (Census 2018)
  - Total: 18,865
  - Density: 44.8/km^{2} (116/sq mi)
- Time zone: UTC-5
- Website: www.sansebastiandebuenavista-magdalena.gov.co

San Sebastián de Buenavista is a town and municipality of the Colombian Department of Magdalena. Founded in 1748 by Fernando de Mier y Guerra with the name San Sebastián de Melchiquejo, but was later changed on November 15, 1957 when it was erected municipality.

== Politics ==
=== Administrative divisions ===
Corregimientos:

- Troncosito
- Troncoso
- Buenavista
- El Coco
- Las Margaritas
- La Pacha
- Los Galvis
- San Valentín
- Sabanas de Peralejo
- Maria Antonia
- Venero
- El Seis
- San Rafael
- Santa Rosa
- Dividivi

== Climate ==
Climate data for San Sebastián de Buenavista (Alamos Los), elevation 25 m (82 ft), (1981–2010)
| Month | Jan | Feb | Mar | Apr | May | Jun | Jul | Aug | Sep | Oct | Nov | Dec | Year |
|---|---|---|---|---|---|---|---|---|---|---|---|---|---|
| Mean daily maximum °C (°F) | 34.7 (94.5) | 35.8 (96.4) | 35.8 (96.4) | 35.4 (95.7) | 34.4 (93.9) | 34.4 (93.9) | 35.2 (95.4) | 34.4 (93.9) | 33.2 (91.8) | 33.4 (92.1) | 32.8 (91.0) | 33.8 (92.8) | 34.5 (94.1) |
| Daily mean °C (°F) | 28.0 (82.4) | 28.9 (84.0) | 29.4 (84.9) | 29.0 (84.2) | 28.5 (83.3) | 28.4 (83.1) | 28.7 (83.7) | 28.5 (83.3) | 27.9 (82.2) | 27.5 (81.5) | 27.4 (81.3) | 27.5 (81.5) | 28.3 (82.9) |
| Mean daily minimum °C (°F) | 21.1 (70.0) | 21.8 (71.2) | 22.8 (73.0) | 23.5 (74.3) | 23.5 (74.3) | 23.2 (73.8) | 23.1 (73.6) | 22.9 (73.2) | 22.8 (73.0) | 22.9 (73.2) | 22.8 (73.0) | 22.1 (71.8) | 22.7 (72.9) |
| Average precipitation mm (inches) | 13.2 (0.52) | 23.0 (0.91) | 57.3 (2.26) | 134.2 (5.28) | 195.5 (7.70) | 157.6 (6.20) | 112.3 (4.42) | 189.3 (7.45) | 211.7 (8.33) | 186.7 (7.35) | 148.1 (5.83) | 66.1 (2.60) | 1,449.7 (57.07) |
| Average precipitation days | 1 | 3 | 5 | 10 | 12 | 10 | 10 | 13 | 14 | 13 | 11 | 5 | 105 |
| Average relative humidity (%) | 76 | 73 | 74 | 78 | 82 | 82 | 80 | 81 | 83 | 85 | 85 | 81 | 80 |
| Mean monthly sunshine hours | 266.6 | 234.3 | 217.0 | 183.0 | 182.9 | 201.0 | 226.3 | 217.0 | 180.0 | 192.2 | 189.0 | 229.4 | 2,518.7 |
| Mean daily sunshine hours | 8.6 | 8.3 | 7.0 | 6.1 | 5.9 | 6.7 | 7.3 | 7.0 | 6.0 | 6.2 | 6.3 | 7.4 | 6.9 |
Source: Instituto de Hidrologia Meteorologia y Estudios Ambientales

Climate data for San Sebastián de Buenavista (Seis El), elevation 50 m (160 ft), (1981–2010)
| Month | Jan | Feb | Mar | Apr | May | Jun | Jul | Aug | Sep | Oct | Nov | Dec | Year |
|---|---|---|---|---|---|---|---|---|---|---|---|---|---|
| Mean daily maximum °C (°F) | 35.8 (96.4) | 36.3 (97.3) | 36.0 (96.8) | 34.6 (94.3) | 33.3 (91.9) | 33.8 (92.8) | 34.4 (93.9) | 34.0 (93.2) | 33.2 (91.8) | 32.4 (90.3) | 32.7 (90.9) | 33.9 (93.0) | 34.1 (93.4) |
| Daily mean °C (°F) | 29.0 (84.2) | 29.6 (85.3) | 29.7 (85.5) | 29.1 (84.4) | 28.7 (83.7) | 28.7 (83.7) | 28.9 (84.0) | 28.9 (84.0) | 28.6 (83.5) | 28.2 (82.8) | 28.3 (82.9) | 28.4 (83.1) | 28.8 (83.8) |
| Mean daily minimum °C (°F) | 21.2 (70.2) | 22.2 (72.0) | 23.1 (73.6) | 23.2 (73.8) | 23.2 (73.8) | 22.9 (73.2) | 22.9 (73.2) | 22.9 (73.2) | 22.7 (72.9) | 22.5 (72.5) | 22.6 (72.7) | 21.6 (70.9) | 22.6 (72.7) |
| Average precipitation mm (inches) | 15.3 (0.60) | 18.6 (0.73) | 52.2 (2.06) | 127.6 (5.02) | 164.5 (6.48) | 130.3 (5.13) | 102.4 (4.03) | 173.8 (6.84) | 158.4 (6.24) | 172.9 (6.81) | 125.9 (4.96) | 52.2 (2.06) | 1,245.1 (49.02) |
| Average precipitation days | 1 | 2 | 4 | 7 | 8 | 7 | 7 | 10 | 9 | 9 | 7 | 3 | 72 |
| Average relative humidity (%) | 71 | 69 | 72 | 75 | 78 | 78 | 77 | 78 | 80 | 82 | 81 | 76 | 76 |
Source: Instituto de Hidrologia Meteorologia y Estudios Ambientales
