= San Zenón =

Coordinates: 9°20′N 74°18′W

- town
- Flag

- Location of the municipality and town of San Zenón in the Department of Magdalena.
- Country: Colombia
- Region: Caribbean
- Department: Magdalena
- Foundation: 1751

Population (2005)
  - Total: 8,749
- Time zone: UTC-5
- Website: www.santaana-magdalena.gov.co

San Zenón (Spanish pronunciation: [san seˈnon]) is a town and municipality of the Colombian Department of Magdalena. It was founded in 1751 by Antonio de Mier y Guerra. On April 30, 1950, it was elevated to the category of municipality.

== Politics ==
=== Administrative divisions ===
Corregimientos

- Peñoncito
- Palomar
- Angostura
- Bermejal
- Janeiro
- Santa Rosa
- Santa Teresa
- Guinea
- El Horno
- Puerto Arturo
