= El Piñón =

Coordinates: 10°20′N 74°40′W

- town
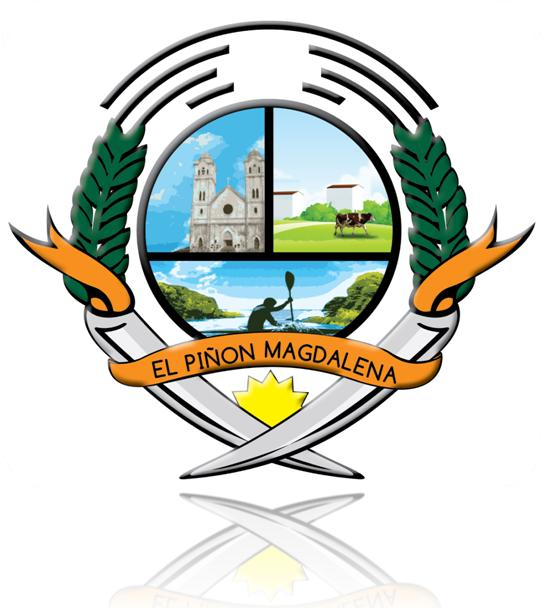
- Flag Coat of arms

- Location of the municipality and town of El Piñón in the Department of Magdalena.
- Country: Colombia
- Region: Caribbean
- Department: Magdalena
- Foundation: 1760

Area
  - Total: 547 km^{2} (211 sq mi)

Population (Census 2018)
  - Total: 17,308
  - Density: 31.6/km^{2} (82.0/sq mi)
- Time zone: UTC-5
- Website: www.elpinon-magdalena.gov.co

El Piñón is a town and municipality of the Colombian Department of Magdalena. Officially founded in 1760 by Francisco Sayas, Ignacio Crespo, Vicente De la Hoz and others. On April 20, 1915 was proclaimed a municipality. Its economy is based on agriculture and farming. Its main tourist attractions are the Iglesia San Pedro Mártir (Saint Peter the Martir Church) and the Ave Maria Monument. The town celebrates carnivals, the Saint Peter of Verona Day in April, El Milagroso in September, the Unedited Song Festival and the Decimates Festival.

== Corregimientos ==
- Campoalegre
- Cantagallar
- Carreto
- Playón de Orozco
- Sabanas
- San Basilio
- Tío Gollo
- Veranillo
- Vásquez
