= Salamina, Magdalena =

Coordinates: 10.4933°N 74.7983°W

Salamina
- town
- Flag

- Location of the municipality and town of Salamina in the Department of Magdalena.
- Country: Colombia
- Region: Caribbean
- Department: Magdalena
- Foundation: circa 1607

Population (2005)
  - Total: 8,239
- Time zone: UTC-5
- Website: www.salamina-magdalena.gov.co

Salamina is a town and municipality in the Department of Magdalena, northern Colombia.

- Area: 175 km^{2}.
- Elevation: 6 meters
- Population: 11,293
  - Rural: 5,337
  - Urban: 5,956
- Agricultural products: livestock, corn, tomatoes, yuca

== Points of interest ==
- Bolivar's house in 1812
- Church of Our Lady of Carmen
