= Santa Bárbara de Pinto =

Coordinates: 9°26′N 74°42′W

- town
- Flag

- Location of the municipality and town of Santa Barbara de Pinto in the Department of Magdalena.
- Country: Colombia
- Region: Caribbean
- Department: Magdalena
- Foundation: 1791

Area
  - Total: 502 km^{2} (194 sq mi)

Population (Census 2018)
  - Total: 9,345
  - Density: 18.6/km^{2} (48.2/sq mi)
- Time zone: UTC-5
- Website: www.santabarbaradepinto-magdalena.gov.co

Santa Bárbara de Pinto is a town and municipality of the Magdalena Department in northern Colombia.
