= Sitionuevo =

Coordinates: 10°47′N 74°43′W

- town
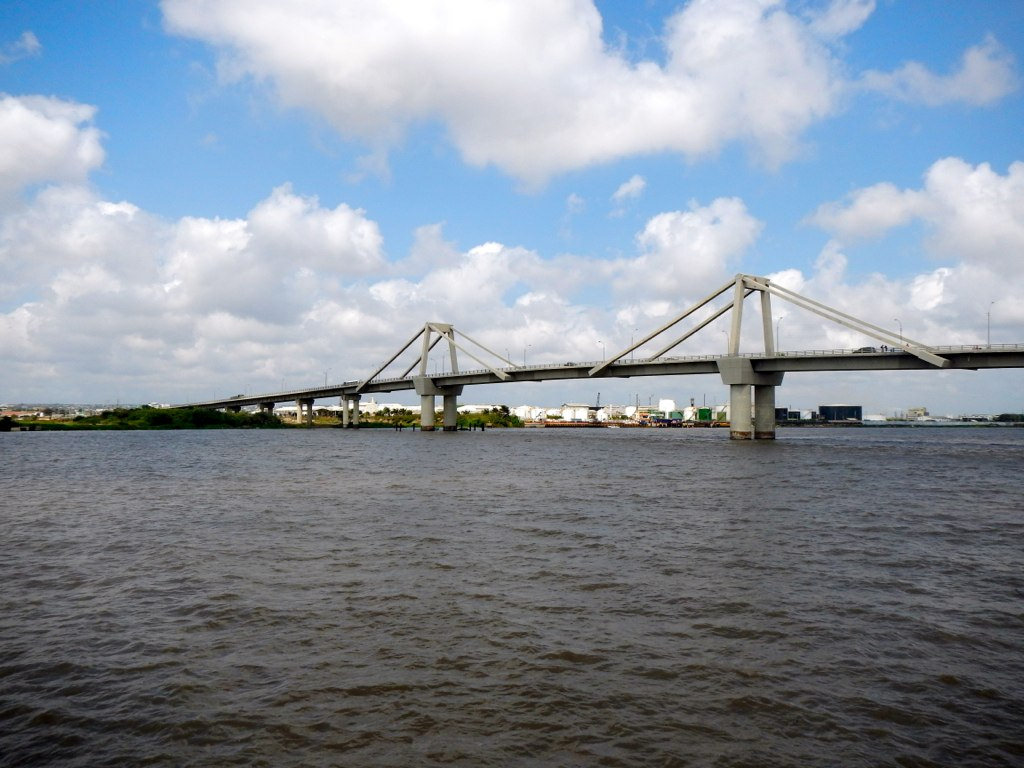

- Flag

- Location of the municipality and town of Sitio Nuevo in the Department of Magdalena.
- Country: Colombia
- Region: Caribbean
- Department: Magdalena

Population (2020 est.)
  - Total: 33,440
- Time zone: UTC-5
- Website: www.sitionuevo-magdalena.gov.co

Sitionuevo is a town and municipality of the Magdalena Department in northern Colombia.
