= Guamal =

Coordinates: 9.14722°N 74.23°W

Guamal, Magdalena
- Flag Coat of arms

- Location of the municipality and town of Guamal in the department of Magdalena.
- Country: Colombia
- Region: Caribbean
- Department: Magdalena

Population (Census 2018)
  - Total: 25,312
- Time zone: UTC-5
- Website: www.guamal-magdalena.gov.co

Guamal is a town and municipality of the Colombian department of Magdalena.

== Administrative divisions ==
The Municipality of Guanal is formed by 22 corregimientos and 31 veredas:

Corregimientos	veredas	Notes
Bellavista; Casa de Tabla; Guaimaral; Hato Viejo; La Ceiba; Las Flores; Pedregoza; Los Andes; Murillo; Pajaral; Playas Blancas; Pampan; Paraco; Ricaurte; Salvadora; San Antonio; San Isidro; San Pedro; Santa Teresa; Sitio Nuevo; Urquijo; Villanueva	Carretero; Guacamayal; San Agustin; Pueblo Nuevo; S de Marañon; Isla Grande; Cuatro Bocas; S de Tasajera; Puerto Rangel; Mocuto; Kilometro 14; S del Osco; Bella Union; Campo Amor; San Francisco; Los Tamaquitos; La Peña; El Guaimaro; El Ecuador; La Estacion; Aguada de Moreno; Manantial; La Linda; Cascajal; El Totumo; Las Pachitas; Villa Conchi; Coyaima; Poncio; Las Guayabitas; El Pantano	The municipality has 31 veredas
