= Santa Ana, Magdalena =

Santa Ana
- town
- Flag Coat of arms

- Location in Colombia
- Coordinates: 9.319°N 74.570°W
- Country: Colombia
- Region: Caribbean
- Department: Magdalena
- Foundation: 1751

Population (Census 2018)
  - Total: 22,723
- Time zone: UTC-5
- Website: www.santaana-magdalena.gov.co

Santa Ana is a town and municipality of the Magdalena Department in northern Colombia. Founded in 1751 by José Fernando de Mier y Guerra with the name of Santa Ana de Buena Vista. In 1918 was established as a municipality.

== Politics ==
=== Administrative divisions ===
Corregimientos

- Barro Blanco
- San Fernando
- Jaraba
- Santa Rosa
