= Remolino =

Coordinates: 10°40′N 74°35′W

- town
- Flag Coat of arms

- Location of the municipality and town of Remolino in the Department of Magdalena.
- Country: Colombia
- Region: Caribbean
- Department: Magdalena
- Foundation: circa 1752–76

Population (2005)
  - Total: 7,840
- Time zone: UTC-5
- Website: www.remolino-magdalena.gov.co

Remolino is a town and municipality of the Colombian Department of Magdalena. Founded between 1752 and 1776 by Fernando de Mier y Guerra. Erected municipality in 1814.

== Politics ==
=== Administrative divisions ===
Corregimientos:

- Corral Viejo
- El Dividivi
- San Rafael
- Santa Rita
- El Salado
- Martinete
- Las Casitas
- Buenavista
- Candelaria
- Rosa Vieja
