= Zapayán =

Coordinates: 10.1708°N 74.7194°W

- town
- Flag

- Location of the municipality and town of Zapayán in the Department of Magdalena.
- Country: Colombia
- Region: Caribbean
- Department: Magdalena

Population (2005)
  - Total: 8,464
- Time zone: UTC-5
- Website: www.zapayan-magdalena.gov.co

Zapayán (Spanish pronunciation: [sapaˈʝan]) is a town and municipality of the Magdalena Department in northern Colombia.
