= Pijiño =

Coordinates: 9°20′N 74°27′W

Pijiño del Carmen
- town
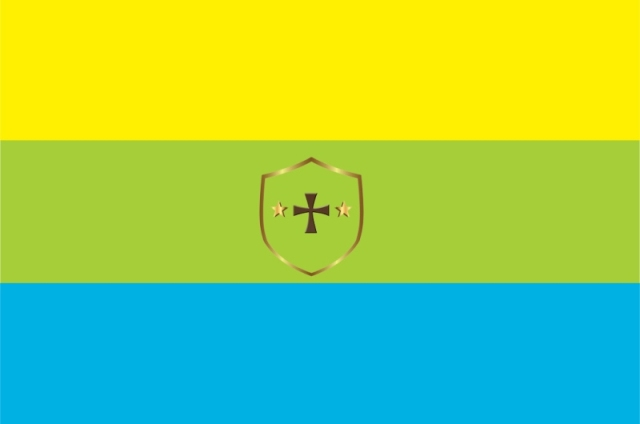
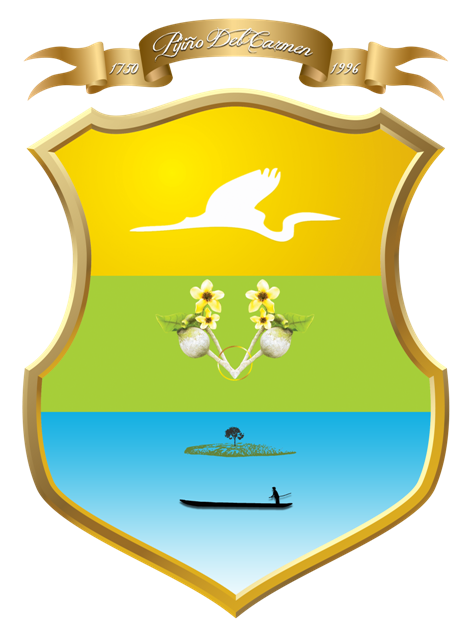
- Flag Coat of arms

- Location of the municipality and town of Pijiño del Carmen in the Department of Magdalena.
- Country: Colombia
- Region: Caribbean
- Department: Magdalena

Area
  - Total: 739 km^{2} (285 sq mi)

Population (Census 2018)
  - Total: 11,071
  - Density: 15.0/km^{2} (38.8/sq mi)
- Time zone: UTC-5
- Website: www.pijinodelcarmen-magdalena.gov.co

Pijiño or Pijiño del Carmen is a town and municipality of the Magdalena Department in northern Colombia.
