= San Lorenzo, Magdalena =

San Lorenzo
- Location in Magdalena and Colombia San Lorenzo (Colombia)
- Coordinates: 11°4′48.0″N 74°2′1.0″W
- Country: Colombia
- Department: Magdalena
- Municipality: Santa Marta Municipality
- Elevation: 7,200 ft (2,200 m)
- Time zone: UTC-5 (Colombia Standard Time)

San Lorenzo is a settlement in Santa Marta Municipality, Magdalena Department in Colombia.

== Climate ==
San Lorenzo has a pleasant through extremely dull and foggy subtropical highland climate (Köppen Cwb) with heavy to very heavy rainfall from April to December and little rain from January to March.

Climate data for San Lorenzo
Month	Jan	Feb	Mar	Apr	May	Jun	Jul	Aug	Sep	Oct	Nov	Dec	Year
Mean daily maximum °C (°F)	17.4 (63.3)	17.7 (63.9)	17.9 (64.2)	18.0 (64.4)	18.2 (64.8)	18.6 (65.5)	18.6 (65.5)	18.4 (65.1)	17.8 (64.0)	17.2 (63.0)	16.9 (62.4)	17.1 (62.8)	17.8 (64.1)
Daily mean °C (°F)	12.4 (54.3)	13.0 (55.4)	13.3 (55.9)	13.9 (57.0)	14.3 (57.7)	14.4 (57.9)	14.2 (57.6)	14.1 (57.4)	13.7 (56.7)	13.5 (56.3)	13.3 (55.9)	12.7 (54.9)	13.6 (56.4)
Mean daily minimum °C (°F)	7.7 (45.9)	8.2 (46.8)	8.8 (47.8)	9.7 (49.5)	10.2 (50.4)	10.2 (50.4)	9.9 (49.8)	10.0 (50.0)	9.8 (49.6)	9.7 (49.5)	9.2 (48.6)	8.1 (46.6)	9.3 (48.7)
Average rainfall mm (inches)	17.5 (0.69)	27.6 (1.09)	34.7 (1.37)	162.7 (6.41)	285.9 (11.26)	319.9 (12.59)	337.1 (13.27)	381.9 (15.04)	410.6 (16.17)	387.5 (15.26)	255.3 (10.05)	109.6 (4.31)	2,730.3 (107.51)
Average rainy days	3	3	5	14	21	21	21	25	26	25	20	8	192
Average relative humidity (%)	89	89	91	93	93	93	92	93	93	94	93	91	92
Mean monthly sunshine hours	96.1	84.7	89.9	78.0	77.5	84.0	105.4	96.1	72.0	55.8	51.0	77.5	968
Mean daily sunshine hours	3.1	3.0	2.9	2.6	2.5	2.8	3.4	3.1	2.4	1.8	1.7	2.5	2.7
