= El Retén =

- town
- Flag

- Location of the municipality and town of El Retén in the Department of Magdalena.

- Location of El Retén in Colombia
- Coordinates: 10°37′N 74°16′W
- Country: Colombia
- Region: Caribbean
- Department: Magdalena
- Foundation: June 24, 1913

Area
  - Total: 268 km^{2} (103 sq mi)
- Elevation: 22 m (72 ft)

Population (Census 2018)
  - Total: 19,345
  - Density: 72.2/km^{2} (187/sq mi)
- Time zone: UTC-5
- Website: elreten-magdalena.gov.co

El Retén is a town and municipality of the Magdalena Department in northern Colombia.

== Climate ==
Climate data for El Retén (Zacapa), elevation 30 m (98 ft), (1971–2000)
Month	Jan	Feb	Mar	Apr	May	Jun	Jul	Aug	Sep	Oct	Nov	Dec	Year
Mean daily maximum °C (°F)	33.8 (92.8)	33.9 (93.0)	34.1 (93.4)	34.4 (93.9)	34.2 (93.6)	34.1 (93.4)	34.2 (93.6)	34.2 (93.6)	33.3 (91.9)	33.1 (91.6)	33.1 (91.6)	33.4 (92.1)	33.8 (92.8)
Daily mean °C (°F)	27.7 (81.9)	27.9 (82.2)	28.3 (82.9)	28.3 (82.9)	28.2 (82.8)	28.3 (82.9)	28.3 (82.9)	28.0 (82.4)	27.8 (82.0)	27.6 (81.7)	27.7 (81.9)	27.6 (81.7)	28.0 (82.4)
Mean daily minimum °C (°F)	20.9 (69.6)	20.9 (69.6)	21.5 (70.7)	21.9 (71.4)	22.2 (72.0)	22.3 (72.1)	22.3 (72.1)	22.2 (72.0)	22.0 (71.6)	22.0 (71.6)	21.9 (71.4)	21.4 (70.5)	21.8 (71.2)
Average precipitation mm (inches)	4.4 (0.17)	6.5 (0.26)	15.1 (0.59)	92.8 (3.65)	151.7 (5.97)	121.6 (4.79)	88.5 (3.48)	135.0 (5.31)	192.0 (7.56)	222.3 (8.75)	121.6 (4.79)	21.0 (0.83)	1,172.4 (46.16)
Average precipitation days	1	1	2	8	11	10	10	12	14	15	9	2	95
Average relative humidity (%)	81	81	80	81	82	83	82	82	82	83	83	84	82
Mean monthly sunshine hours	232.5	212.0	192.2	171.0	173.6	165.0	198.4	179.8	153.0	164.3	186.0	226.3	2,254.1
Mean daily sunshine hours	7.5	7.5	6.2	5.7	5.6	5.5	6.4	5.8	5.1	5.3	6.2	7.3	6.2
Source: Instituto de Hidrologia Meteorologia y Estudios Ambientales
