= Ventana al Mundo, Barranquilla =

Window to the World
- Ventana al Mundo
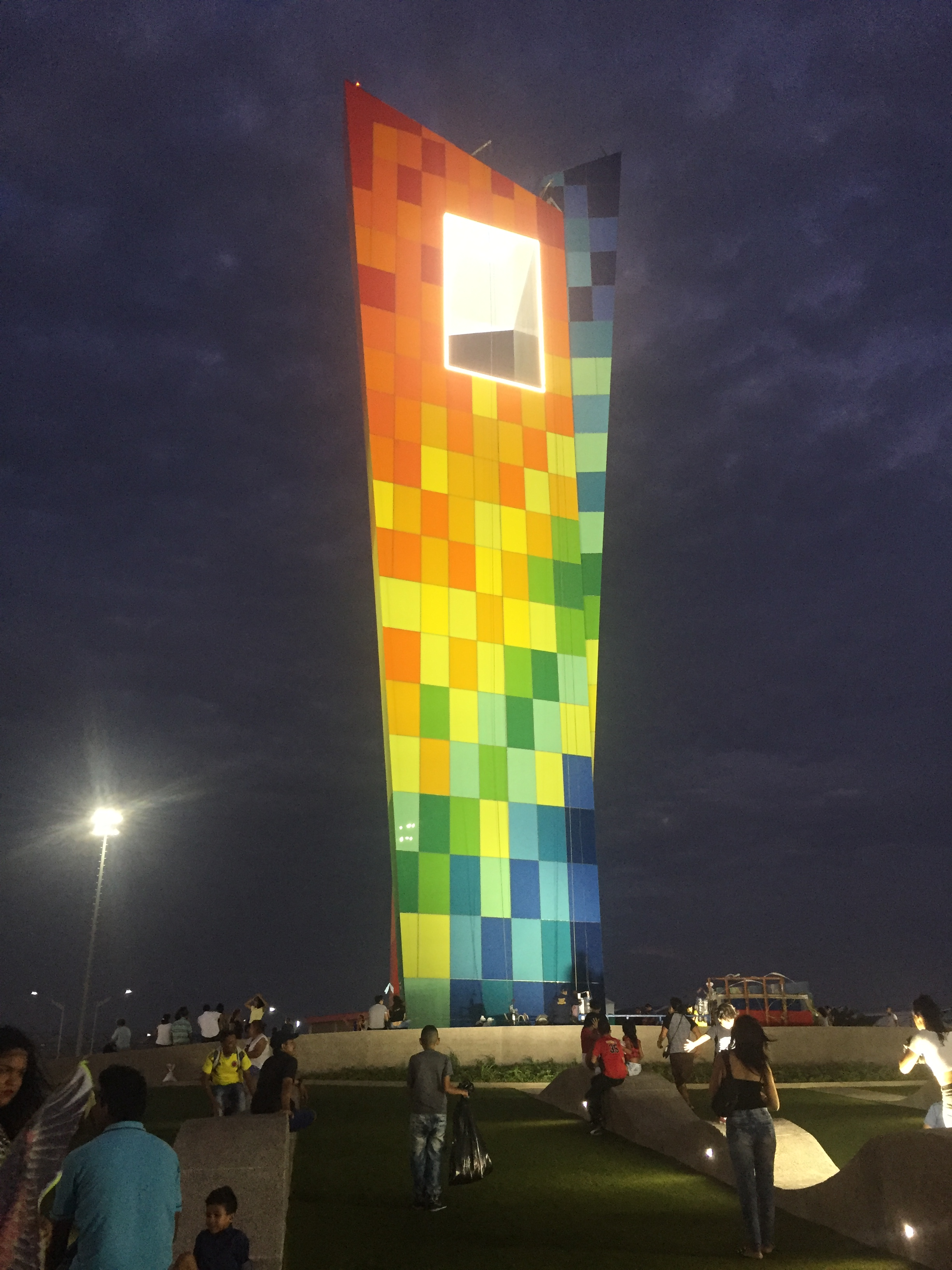
- The monument at night
- 11°01′59″N 74°49′53″W
- Location: Barranquilla, Colombia
- Designer: Diana Escorcia Borelly
- Height: 47 metres (154 ft)
- Opening date: 2018

The Window to the World (in Spanish: Ventana al Mundo) is a public monument located in Barranquilla, Colombia. It was built in 2018 to commemorate the 23rd Central American and Caribbean Games, which the city hosted. It is located in a roundabout in the northern part of the city, near the intersection of the Circunvalar and Via 40.

The monument was built at the initiative of local businessman Christian Daes, through his company Tecnoglass. The inspiration for the initiative possibly came from his personal experience, as he expressed it: "when they closed the doors on him, the windows always remained." Designed by the architect Diana Escorcia Borelly, the construction was supported by the Mayor's Office of Barranquilla.

It has been the setting for numerous public events that have consolidated the monument as an icon of the city and the region. In addition, the significative happenings of the city's history are reproduced on the inner faces of the bases of each tower.
