= Algarrobo, Magdalena =

Coordinates: 10.1°N 74.2667°W

Algarrobo
- town
- Flag Coat of arms

- Location of the municipality and town of Algarrobo in the Department of Magdalena.
- Country: Colombia
- Region: Caribbean
- Department: Magdalena
- Foundation: 1895

Area
  - Total: 409 km^{2} (158 sq mi)

Population (Census 2018)
  - Total: 14,294
  - Density: 34.9/km^{2} (90.5/sq mi)
- Time zone: UTC-5
- Website: []

Algarrobo (Spanish pronunciation: [alɣaˈroβo]) is a town and municipality of the Magdalena Department in northern Colombia. Founded in 1895 by José Felipe Oñate. Erected municipality by ordinance 008 of June 24, 1999.

== Politics ==
=== Sub divisions ===
The municipality of Algarrobo has three corregimientos:

- Bella vista
- Loma del Bálsamo
- Estación Lleras
