= Pedraza, Magdalena =

Coordinates: 10°11′N 74°55′W

Pedraza
- town
- Flag

- Location of the municipality and town of Pedraza in the Department of Magdalena.
- Country: Colombia
- Region: Caribbean
- Department: Magdalena
- Foundation: 1791

Population (2005)
  - Total: 7,865
- Time zone: UTC-5
- Website: www.pedraza-magdalena.gov.co

Pedraza (Spanish pronunciation: [peˈðɾasa]) is a town and municipality of the Colombian Department of Magdalena.

== History ==
Pedestal was founded in 1791 by Pablo José Torregrosa. On December 9, 1908, by Executive Decree 1312 Pedraza became a municipality of the Magdalena Department.

== Geography ==
Pedraza is mostly flat with undulations as high as 120 meters.

== Political division ==
Corregimientos and caseríos:

- Bahía Honda
- Bomba
- Guaiquirí
- Heredia.

== Economy ==
Pedraza's main economic activity is farming with an emphasis on breeding livestock such as cattle, pork, equines, goats, and mules. Agriculture production is also part of its economy, predominantly yuca, corn, tomato, beans. Artisan fishing is also practiced on the many marshes and streams in the area.

== Attractions ==
Pedraza offers ecotourism sites surrounding Ciénaga La Brava and Riveras del Río.

=== Historical sites ===
Iglesia San Pedro (Saint Peter church), Antiguo Palacio Municipal (Former Cityhall Palace) and the Parque Central (central park).

=== Festivities ===
The town celebrates Carnivals from February through March, while also participating of the Holy Week, Fiesta de la Conversión de San Pablo (Saint Peter's Conversion Feast) every January 25 and the Día del Sagrado Corazón de Jesús (The Sacred Heart of Jesus Day) every June 14.
