= Cerro de San Antonio, Magdalena =

Coordinates: 10°20′N 74°52′W

Cerro de San Antonio
- Municipality
- Flag

- Location of the municipality and town of Cerro San Antonio in the Department of Magdalena.
- Country: Colombia
- Region: Caribbean
- Department: Magdalena
- Foundation: 1750

Population (2005)
  - Total: 8,058
- Time zone: UTC-5
- Website: www.cerrosanantonio-magdalena.gov.co

Cerro de San Antonio is a town and municipality of the Colombian Department of Magdalena. Founded on June 13, 1750 by Fernando de Mier y Guerra near the Magdalena River. The Libertador Simon Bolivar visited this town on May 23, 1813 during the War of Independence of Colombia from Spain.
