= Nueva Granada, Magdalena =

Coordinates: 9.80306°N 74.3903°W

Nueva Granada
- town
- Flag

- Location of the municipality and town of Nueva Granada in the Department of Magdalena.
- Country: Colombia
- Region: Caribbean
- Department: Magdalena

Population (Census 2018)
  - Total: 17,470
- Time zone: UTC-5

Nueva Granada (Spanish pronunciation: [ˈnweβa ɣɾaˈnaða]) is a town and municipality of the Magdalena Department in northern Colombia.
