= Coat of arms of Magdalena Department =

Coat of arms of Magdalena

Versions
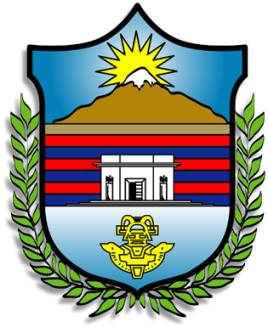
- Alternative version

- Historical coat of arms used from 1861-1886
- Armiger: The Department of Magdalena.
- Shield: Per fess azure, a fess barry of six gules and azure, a pantheon proper, on chief, a snow topped mountain proper and river vert, a sun in his glory issuant from behind Or; on base, a Tayrona pendant Or proper.
- Other elements: A wreath of olive branches surrounds the arms.
- Use: Gubernatorial Flag, official paperwork.

The coat of arms of Magdalena is the official coat of arms of the Colombian department of Magdalena. It was officially adopted by the Departmental Assembly out of the winning design presented by native painter Álvaro Corvacho.

== Design ==
The elegant shape of the escutcheon or shield is a combination of two distinct designs, the top, with its three tips is from a Swiss design, the bottom with the tip issuing out from the middle is from a French design. The shield is embraced by an olive branch with 45 leaves on either side, (a total of 90 leaves) a symbol of peace. It has a tincture of azure, but in variant versions the field changes of tincture on both chief and base; in the modern version, the azure or blue represent Magdalena River and the Caribbean Sea. The shield is divided in two by a horizontal band which bears the flag of the Department of Magdalena in the background and in front of it the National Pantheon which is a structure located in Magdalena in the Quinta de San Pedro Alejandrino that honours the Libertador and the fallen heroes of the nation, the superimposition of the structure on the flag symbolizes the integrity and firmness in the souls of the Magdalenenses as well as keeping alive his dream. On chief, that is the part that is on the top, bears the Sierra Nevada de Santa Marta with the radiant sun issuing from behind. The official blazon calls for a snow topped mountain as it would look naturally, i.e. proper, but this leaves the possibility of a representation of the base and hill of the mountain to be coloured green or brown as both are natural colours for mountains. The blazon also calls for a river in vert or green, which is supposed to represent the Magdalena River, this being a more natural representation of the river as it waters are far from being the typical blue shown in heraldry, this however, has been left out of the modern representations of the coat of arms, choosing instead to attribute the blue background as the river. Both of these geographical features represent their importance to the region, its extreme geography going from sea level to 5,775m above sea level, as well as the natural resources it possesses, and additionally the green of the river the hope that its inhabitants have of the department taking a national leadership position, the sun symbolizes their nobility and wisdom. The base has a Tayrona golden pendant, a typical and iconic piece of the culture of the Indigenous peoples of Magdalena.

Charges in the coat of arms of Magdalena
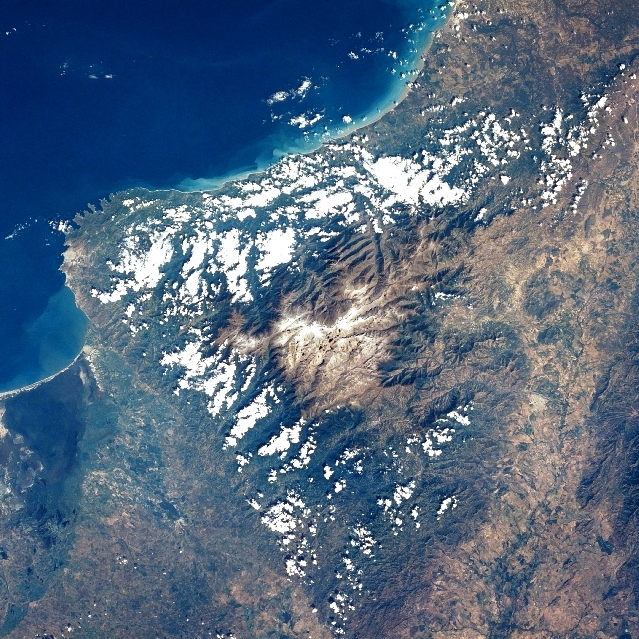
Sierra Nevada de Santa Marta.

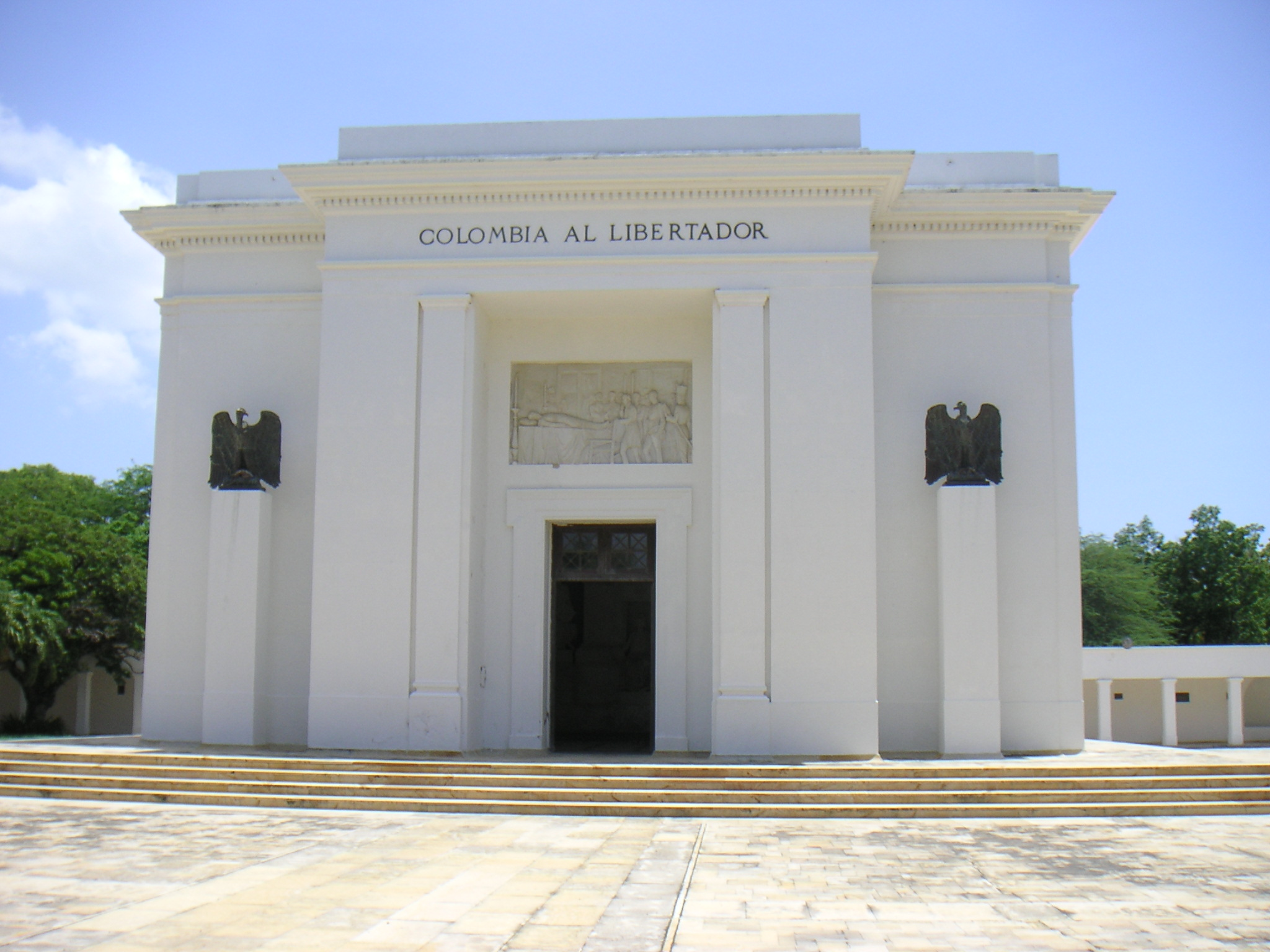
National Pantheon of Simón Bolívar in the Quinta de San Pedro Alejandrino.

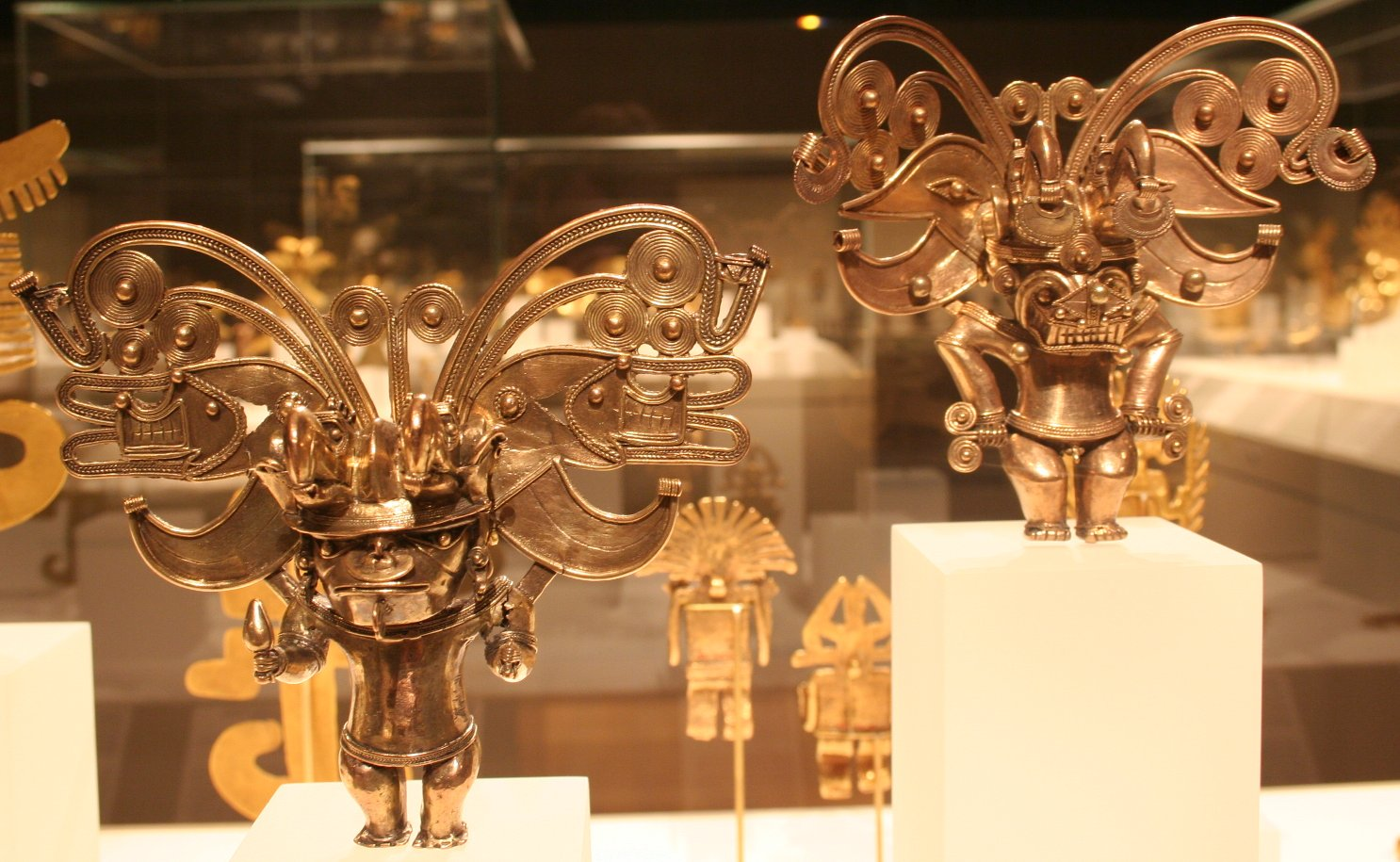
Tayrona Pendants, Gold Museum of Santa Marta.

== History ==
The Department of Magdalena, created in 1824 as one of the original nine Sovereign States of the United States of Colombia, originally used the Coat of arms of Colombia as the official arms of the state with the addition of an inscribed oval around the shield with the words "ESTADO SOBERANO DEL MAGDALENA" (Spanish: Sovereign State of Magdalena). In 1886 the states were dissolved and departments were created instead, with the new change of governance came changes in the coat of arms. To meet this challenge the Department of Magdalena held a meeting with institutions and individuals to address this issue, and finally after different proposals were presented, the coat of arms designed by the painter Alvaro Corpacho was finally adopted as the official insignia for the department.

== See also ==
- Flag of the Department of Magdalena
