= Pivijay =

Coordinates: 10°28′N 74°37′W

- town
- Flag

- Location of the municipality and town of Pivijay in the Department of Magdalena.
- Country: Colombia
- Region: Caribbean
- Department: Magdalena
- Foundation: 1774

Population (2020 est.)
  - Total: 33,047
- Time zone: UTC-5
- Website: www.pivijay-magdalena.gov.co

Pivijay is a town and municipality of the Colombian Department of Magdalena. Founded in 1774 by José Flores, Julian Valera y Antonio Sánchez. Promoted to municipality in 1912.

== Politics ==
=== Administrative divisions ===
Corregimientos:

- Avianca
- Canoas
- Caraballo
- Chinoblas
- Garrapatas
- Las Piedras
- Media Luna
- Paraco (Carmen del Magdalena)
- Paraíso
- Piñuelas
- Placitas
- Salaminita

== Climate ==
Climate data for Pivijay (Media Luna), elevation 20 m (66 ft), (1981–2010)
Month	Jan	Feb	Mar	Apr	May	Jun	Jul	Aug	Sep	Oct	Nov	Dec	Year
Mean daily maximum °C (°F)	34.5 (94.1)	35.1 (95.2)	35.7 (96.3)	35.7 (96.3)	34.7 (94.5)	34.4 (93.9)	34.5 (94.1)	34.4 (93.9)	33.9 (93.0)	33.4 (92.1)	33.2 (91.8)	33.6 (92.5)	34.5 (94.1)
Daily mean °C (°F)	27.5 (81.5)	27.9 (82.2)	28.4 (83.1)	28.7 (83.7)	28.4 (83.1)	28.4 (83.1)	28.3 (82.9)	28.2 (82.8)	27.9 (82.2)	27.6 (81.7)	27.6 (81.7)	27.6 (81.7)	28.0 (82.4)
Mean daily minimum °C (°F)	20.8 (69.4)	21.1 (70.0)	21.7 (71.1)	22.7 (72.9)	23.2 (73.8)	22.9 (73.2)	22.7 (72.9)	22.5 (72.5)	22.6 (72.7)	22.4 (72.3)	22.3 (72.1)	21.5 (70.7)	22.2 (72.0)
Average precipitation mm (inches)	4.2 (0.17)	4.8 (0.19)	19.2 (0.76)	79.7 (3.14)	129.1 (5.08)	110.7 (4.36)	97.5 (3.84)	169.8 (6.69)	161.6 (6.36)	152.7 (6.01)	99.8 (3.93)	40.1 (1.58)	1,069.2 (42.09)
Average precipitation days	0	0	1	5	8	8	7	10	10	10	7	3	69
Average relative humidity (%)	81	79	79	80	82	82	82	82	83	84	84	83	82
Source: Instituto de Hidrologia Meteorologia y Estudios Ambientales
