= Magdalena Department =

Department of Colombia

Department of Magdalena Departamento del Magdalena
- Department
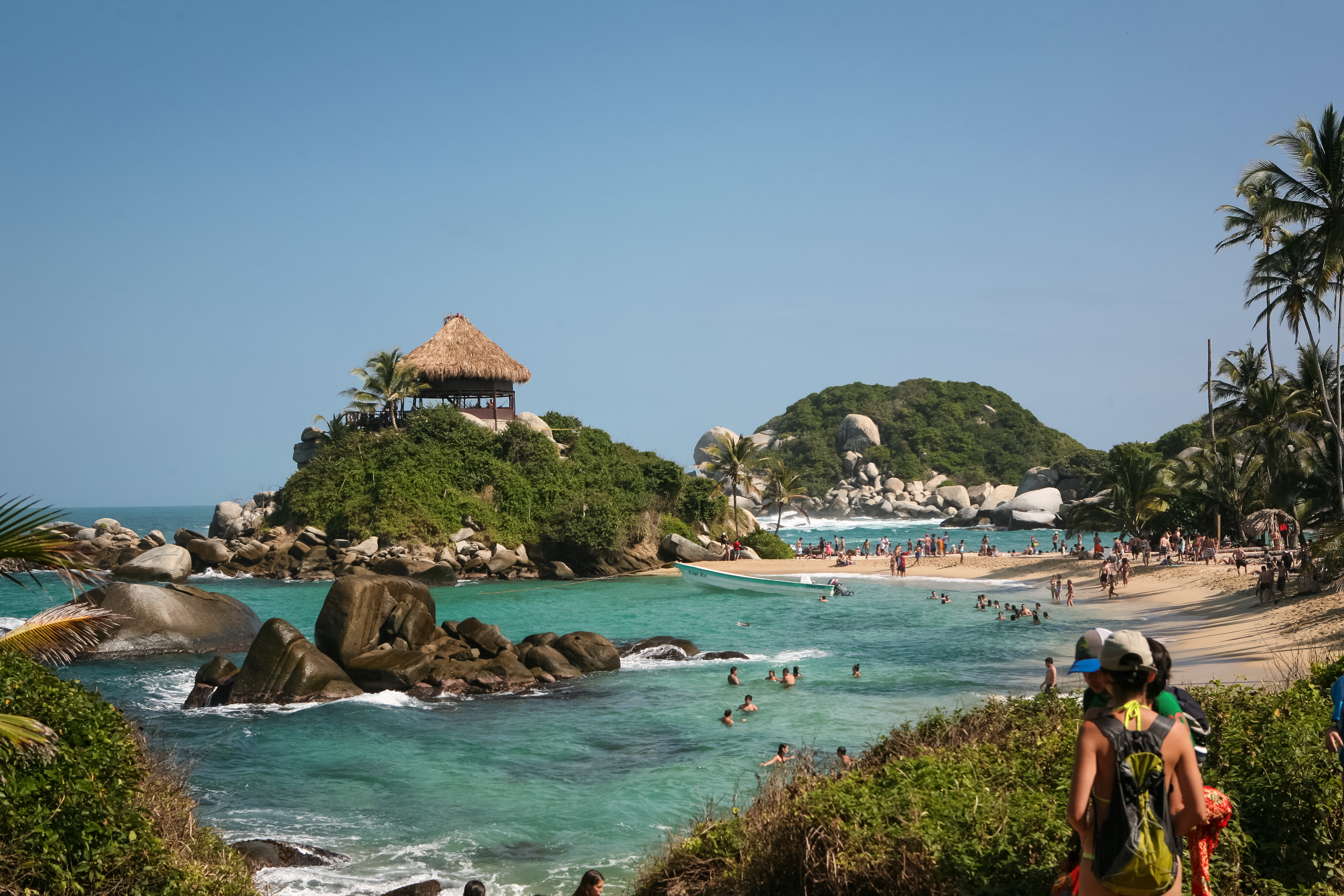
- Tayrona National Natural Park

- Flag Coat of arms
- Motto(s): Liderazgo, Seguridad y Transparencia (Spanish: Leadership, Security and Transparency)
- Anthem: Himno del Magdalena
- Magdalena shown in red

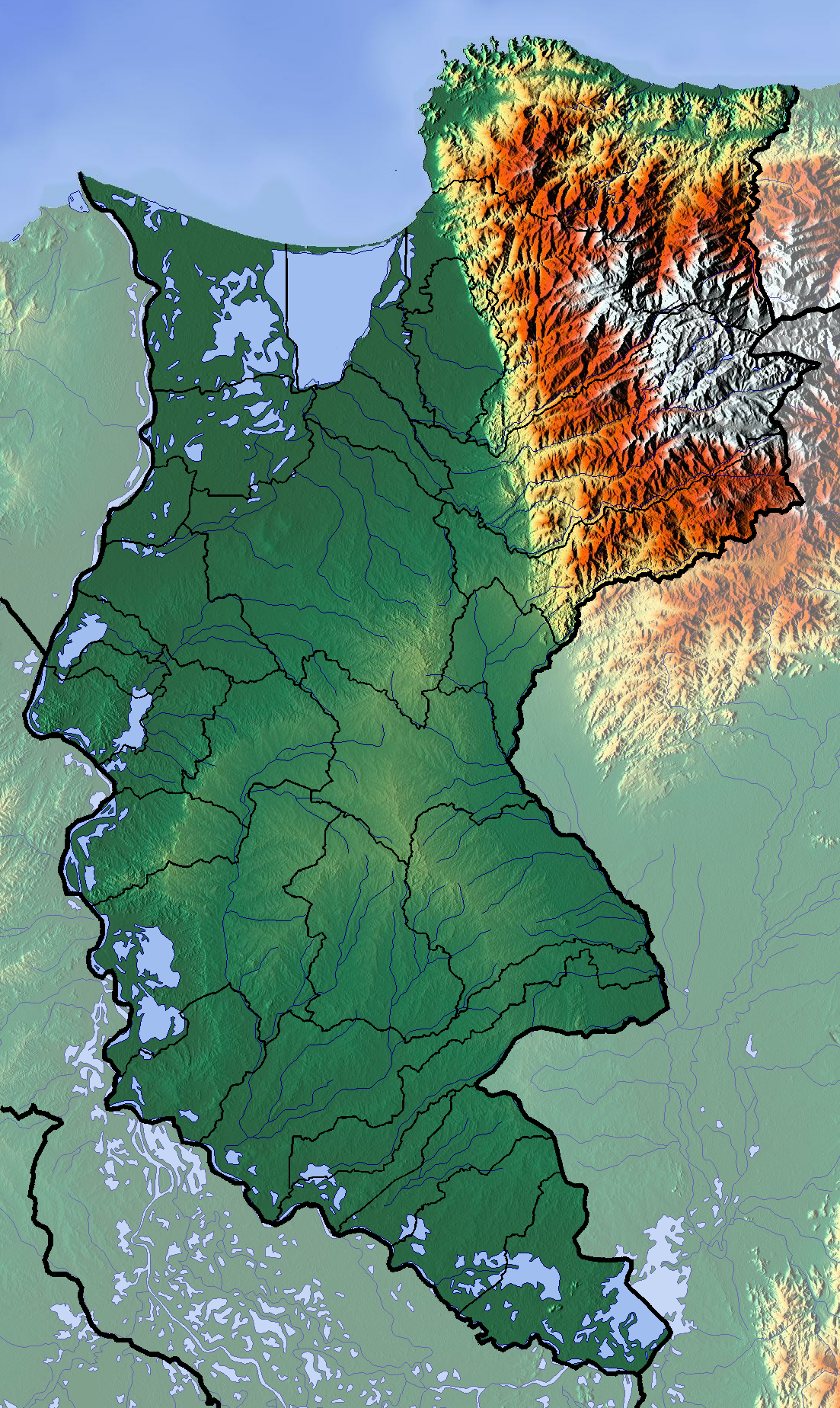
- Topography of the department
- Coordinates: 11°14′31″N 74°12′19″W
- Country: Colombia
- Region: Caribbean Region
- Established: 25 July 1824
- Capital: Santa Marta

Government
  - Governor: Carlos Caceido
  - Legislature: Assembly of Magdalena

Area
  - Total: 23,188 km^{2} (8,953 sq mi)
  - Rank: 21st

Population (2018)
  - Total: 1,341,746
  - Rank: 14th
  - Density: 57.864/km^{2} (149.87/sq mi)

GDP
  - Total: COP 19,738 billion (US$ 4.6 billion)
- Time zone: UTC-05
- ISO 3166 code: CO-MAG
- Municipalities: 31
- HDI: 0.747 high · 22nd of 33
- Website: www.gobmagdalena.gov.co

Magdalena (Spanish pronunciation: [maɣðaˈlena]) is a department of Colombia, located in the north of the country by the Caribbean Sea, with more than 1.3 million people. The capital of the Magdalena Department is Santa Marta and was named after the Magdalena River. The department inherited the name of one of the original nine states of the United States of Colombia that its current territory integrated.

== Geography ==
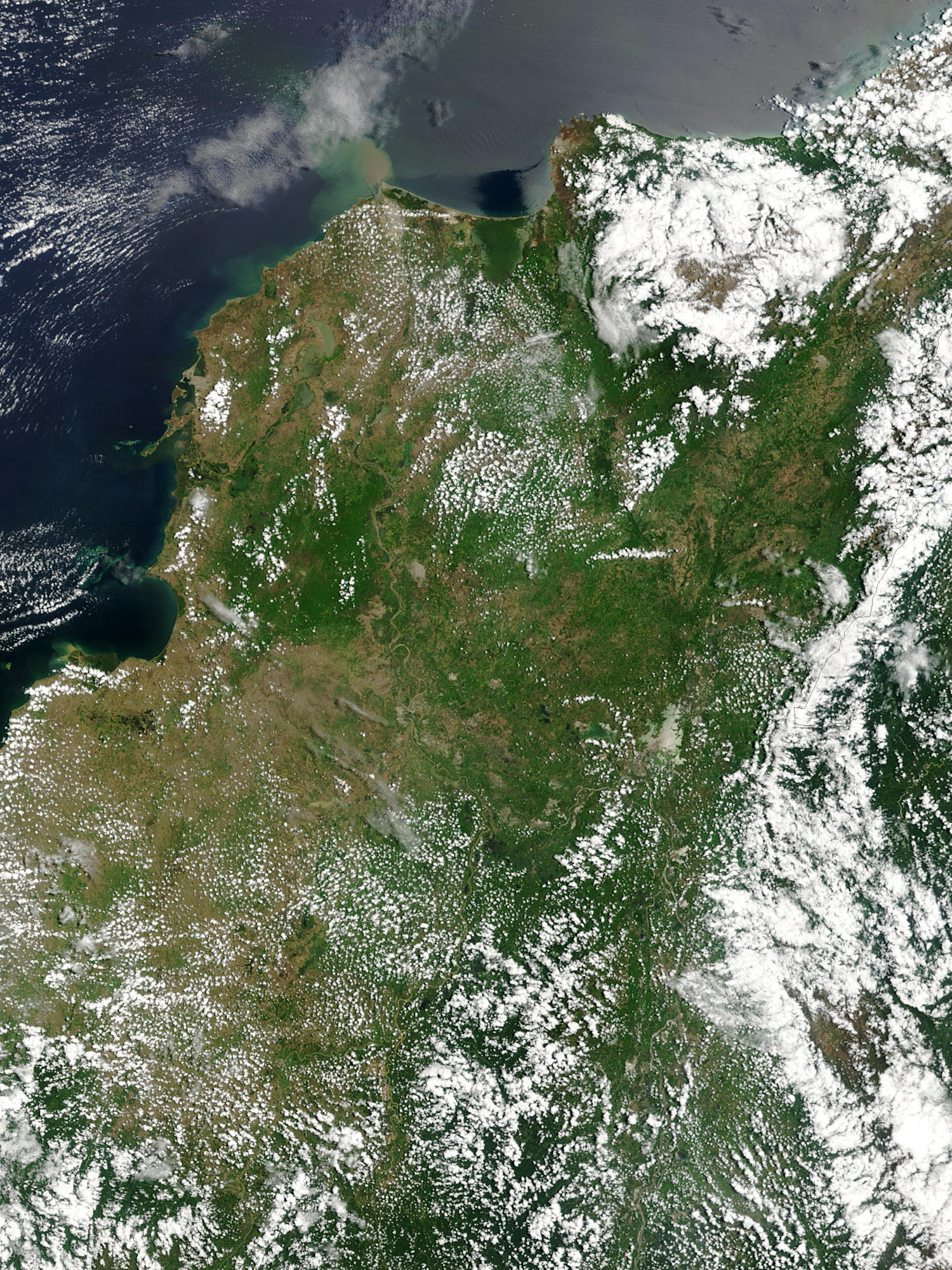
Magdalena Department seen from space.

Historical population
Year	Pop.	±%
1973	540,258	—
1985	890,934	+64.9%
1993	1,127,631	+26.6%
2005	1,149,917	+2.0%
2018	1,341,746	+16.7%

=== Location ===
The Department of Magdalena is located on the North Coast of the Colombian Caribbean Region.

On the north it borders the Caribbean Sea. On the northeast it borders the La Guajira Department, being divided by the Palomino River. On the east it borders with the Cesar Department, which is in part divided by the Guaraní River.

On the west, it is divided by the Magdalena River, and it borders the departments of Atlantico in the Northwest, and Bolívar in the West and Southwest.

=== Hydrology ===
==== Basins ====
The territory of the Department of Magdalena is formed by four drainage basins which are very different in composition and importance.

Sierra Nevada's Northern Slope

The drainage basin of the Sierra Nevada's western slope is located in the northern part of the department. The Sierra Nevada de Santa Marta creates different rivers that run mainly through the municipality of Santa Marta, and that finally end up draining into the Caribbean Sea.

The rivers that form part of this basin are:

- Palomino River
- Don Diego River 2
- Buritaca River
- Guachaca River
- Mendiguaca River
- Piedras River
- Manzanares River
- Gaira River

Sierra Nevada’s Southwestern Slope

This basin gathers its waters from the rivers coming from the southern and western slopes of the Sierra Nevada. The basin irrigates great extensions of the municipalities of Ciénaga, Zona Bananera, Fundación, Aracataca, and El Retén, which are the heart of the agricultural and livestock economy of the department. The rivers that form part of this basin are:

- Frío River
- Sevilla River
- Tucurinca River
- Aracataca River
- Fundación River
- Rosa Creek

It also consists of a small number of arroyos that only flow during the rainy seasons.

This basin also encompasses the Ciénaga Grande de Santa Marta, the largest marsh in the north of the country, which is formed by 16 smaller marshes that are connected by means of arms within the march. The balance of the march is a delicate one that depends on the fresh waters coming from the Sierra Nevada, and the periodical flooding of the Magdalena River, and the salt water coming from the mouth of the March to the sea, that is carried by the current and winds into the marshland.

Magdalena Basin

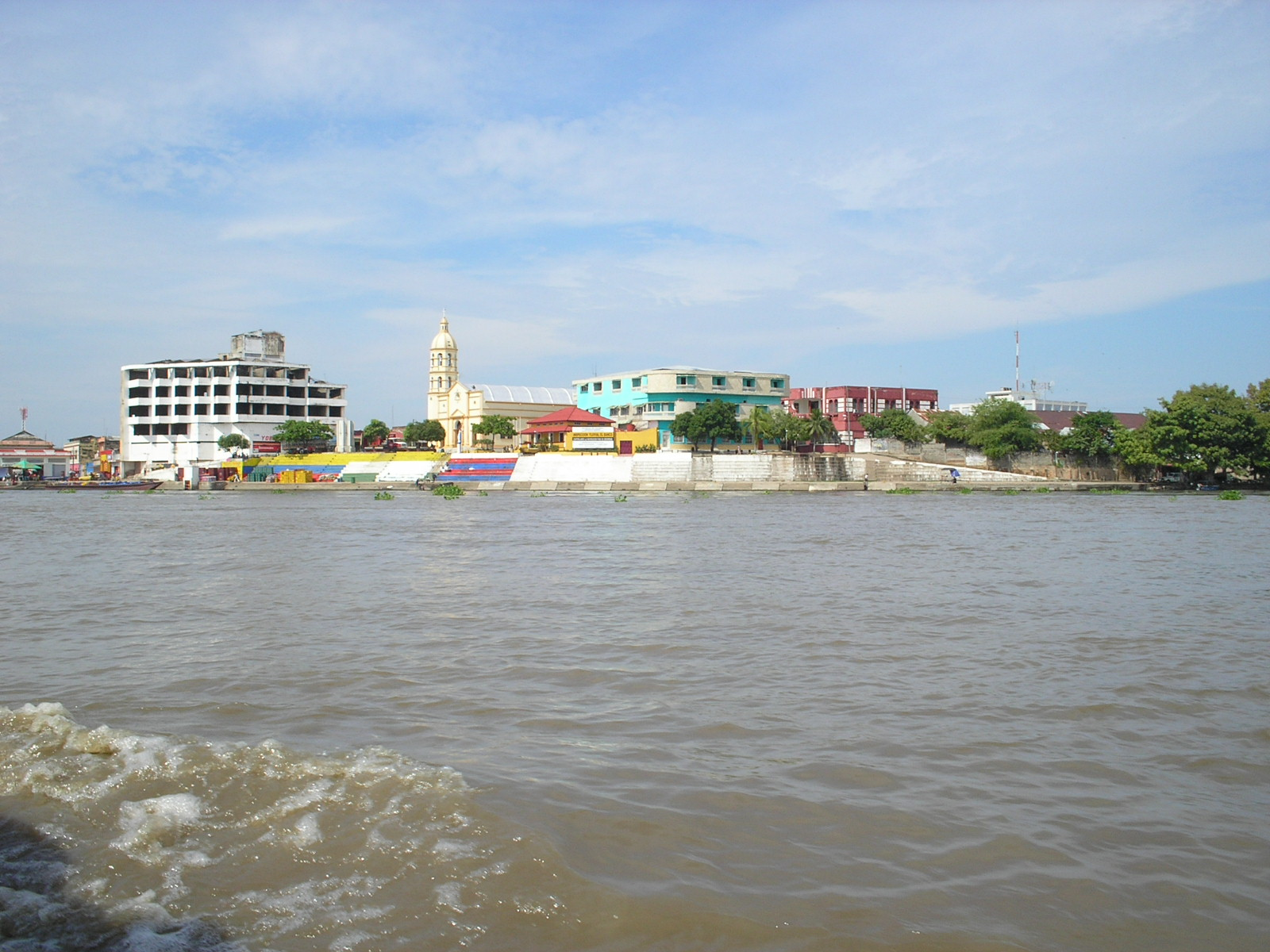
View of the municipality of El Banco from the Magdalena River

The Magdalena River Basin is the largest drainage basin in the department. It is formed by the Magdalena River and its tributaries that feed on to the river and the Marsh.

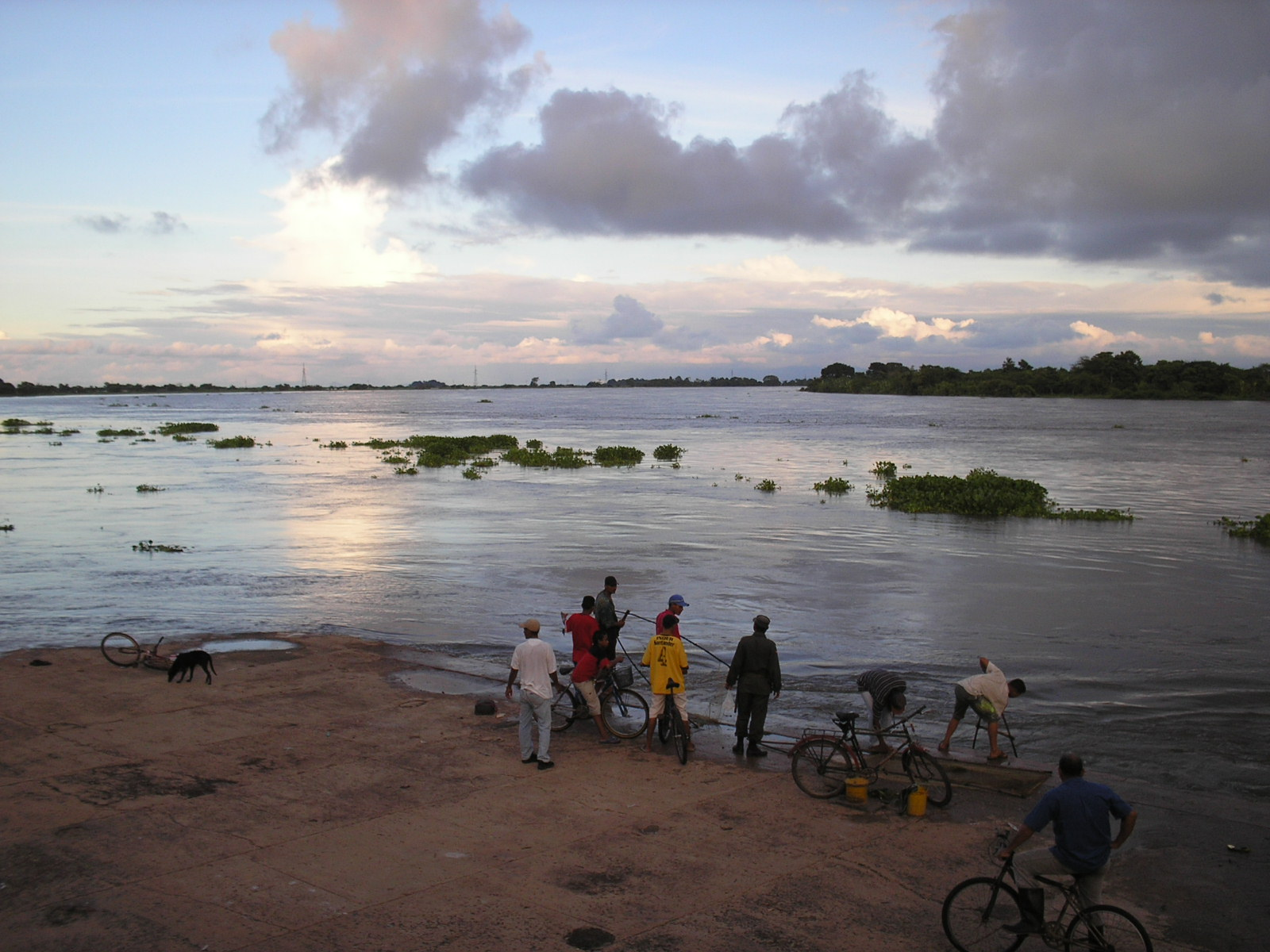
Overflow of the Magdalena River caused floodings in 2005.

The Mompóx Depression is found within this basin, this depression runs from the Zapatosa Marsh to the delta of the Magdalena River. This depression collects the most water in the department as its where the Cauca River, Cesar River, and the San Jorge River drain its waters. The Magdalena River is by far the most affluent river of these, and during the rainy season when it overflows, it causes the other rivers to flow backwards, not before overflowing the marshes and sometimes flooding some valleys.

Ariguaní Basin

The Ariguaní River drains into the Magdalena River through the Zapatosa Marsh and washes over the central valleys of the departments of Magdalena and Cesar that are the principal areas of agriculture and animal husbandry in the Caribbean Region.

Marshes

The department of Magdalena is characterized by its many marshes and extensive marshland valleys. The whole western side of the department its dotted with marshes and lakes due to the Magdalena River that borders the department on this side. Most of this marshes are located in the northwestern side. The permanent marshes are, Chilloa, La Rinconada, Tesca, Pijiño, Juan Criollo, Jaraba, Playa Afuera, Ciénaga Grande de Santa Marta, and Zapatosa.

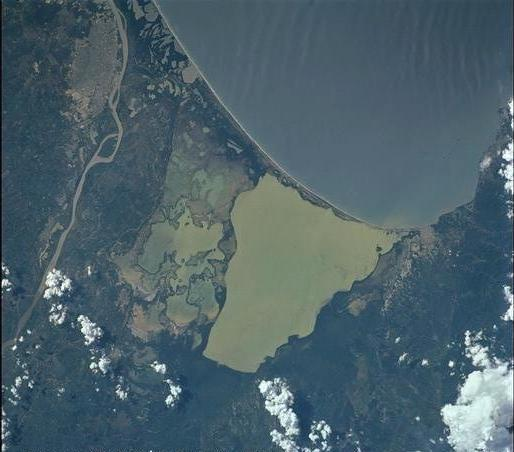
Ciénaga Grande de Santa Marta

The Ciénaga Grande de Santa Marta, is the biggest and by far the most important marsh in the department of Magdalena and one of the most important marshes in the country. It is located in the northwest of the department and is separated from the sea by a very thin margin of land, only a few meters away. It has an extension of 4,280 km^{2} (1,650 sq mi), of which 730 km^{2} (280 sq mi) are just water mirrors with a depth of 2 to 6 meters.

The Zapatosa Marsh, located in the municipality of El Plato in the southernmost part of the department, it is shared with the Cesar Department, who controls most of its waters. It has an extension of 310 km^{2} (120 sq mi) and at its deepest it reaches about 8 metres (26 ft). In it many rivers of different importance merge. The Zapatosa Marsh drains into the Magdalena River by an arm of about 16 km (10 mi) of length.

=== Climate ===
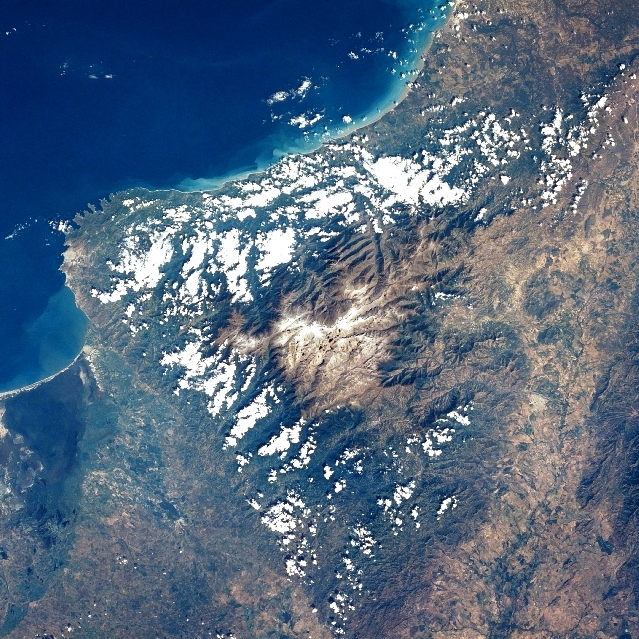
Sierra Nevada de Santa Marta from space

The Department of Magdalena, because of its terrain, and proximity to the sea has an unstable weather. Its climate is mainly dictated by its global positioning, and because the department of Magdalena is located on the Intertropical Convergence Zone it possess an inter-tropical climate. Temperature in the department is affected by ocean currents, precipitation and atmospheric pressure, it mainly has a hot temperatures with high humidity, but temperatures vary as altitude raises.

The altitude of the department goes from 0m to 5,775m above sea levels, the drastic changes of altitude divide the territory into what is called thermal floors. There are no solid or determined divides between these floors as local factors can affect the temperature. The first 200m of altitude are considered the warm lands, they occupy a great extension of the departmental territory, the average temperature is of 30 °C. The main urban centers are located in the warm lands, including all of the downtown urban area of Santa Marta. The altitude increase because of the Sierra Nevada de Santa Marta, an isolated mountain, the highest at sea level, and temperatures raise as it goes up.

=== Winds ===
Illustration of the Föhn effect

The presence of the Sierra Nevada in this area of the country has consequences in the climate of the department, the SNSM stands windward blocking the path of the Trade winds that blow from the North and Northeast creating a greater cloud accumulation and precipitation. The winds that crash into the mountain ascend in an Orographic lift, this cooler air cannot hold the moisture as well as warm air and this effectively raises the relative humidity, creating clouds and frequently precipitation. The clouds that manage to pass over the mountain, move hastily downwards creating foehn winds that raise the temperature of the area west of the Sierra, which include the Santa Marta, and Ciénaga.

In the coastal area, droughts are cause by the diversion of the cold and warm katabatic winds coming down the Sierra, however the sea breezes help to cool down temperatures a bit, but by because of their direction, they end up extending the drought effects farther inland.

=== Rainfall ===
The department of Magdalena due to its location in the Intertropical Convergence Zone has only two seasons. The Rainy season takes place between April and November, with a period of less intensity between June and August. The dry season takes place during December and March.

The Mompox Depression presents its own climatic conditions due to its many permanent bodies of water, like the different ciénagas or mashes, and rivers and lakes. This wet habitat, permanently exposed to solar radiation, makes for a very humid environment, with an average annual rainfall of between 1,500 and 2,000mm, these rains are Convection rains as they are created by evaporation of its waters by high temperatures, this is typical precipitation around the equatorial belt.

Due to its complicated geography, the precipitation in the department ranges from 250mm in the driest areas, to 4,000mm in the cold floors of the Sierra Nevada.

=== Environment ===
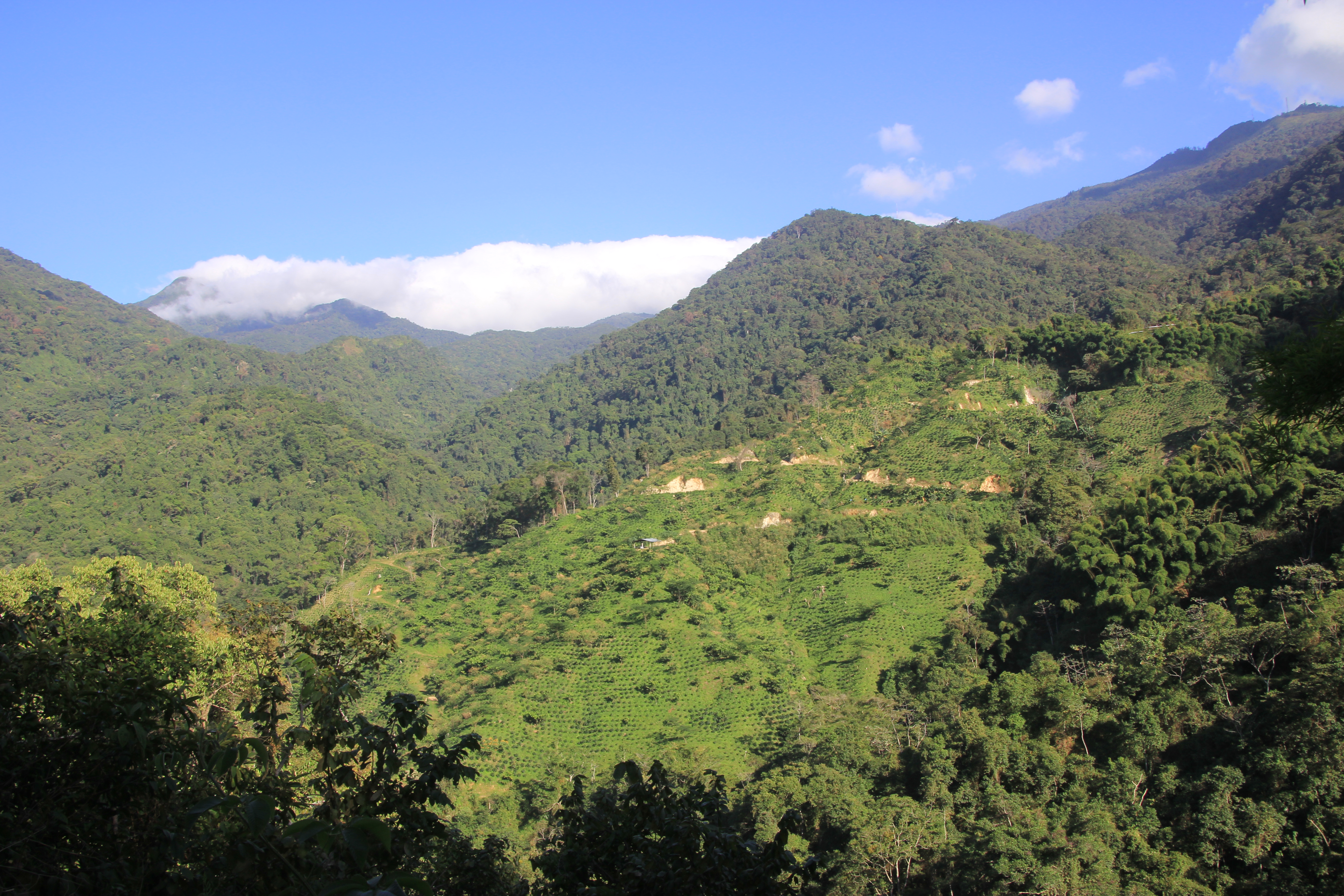
Coffee farms in the Sierra Nevada

The territory of Magdalena has an area of approximately 23,188 km², small compared to other regions, but in its territory various types of different ecoregions are found. From the beaches and sea landscape in the North, the snow-covered peaks in the Sierra, the swampy marshes in the west, the cloud forests, to the grasslands inland, the urban districts, the farmlands, the dry desert like, the deep rain forest, the rocky rivers to many other small ecosystems. These ecosystem support different fauna and flora and house many delicate species.

==== Ecoregions ====
Kids playing in the beach in Santa Marta

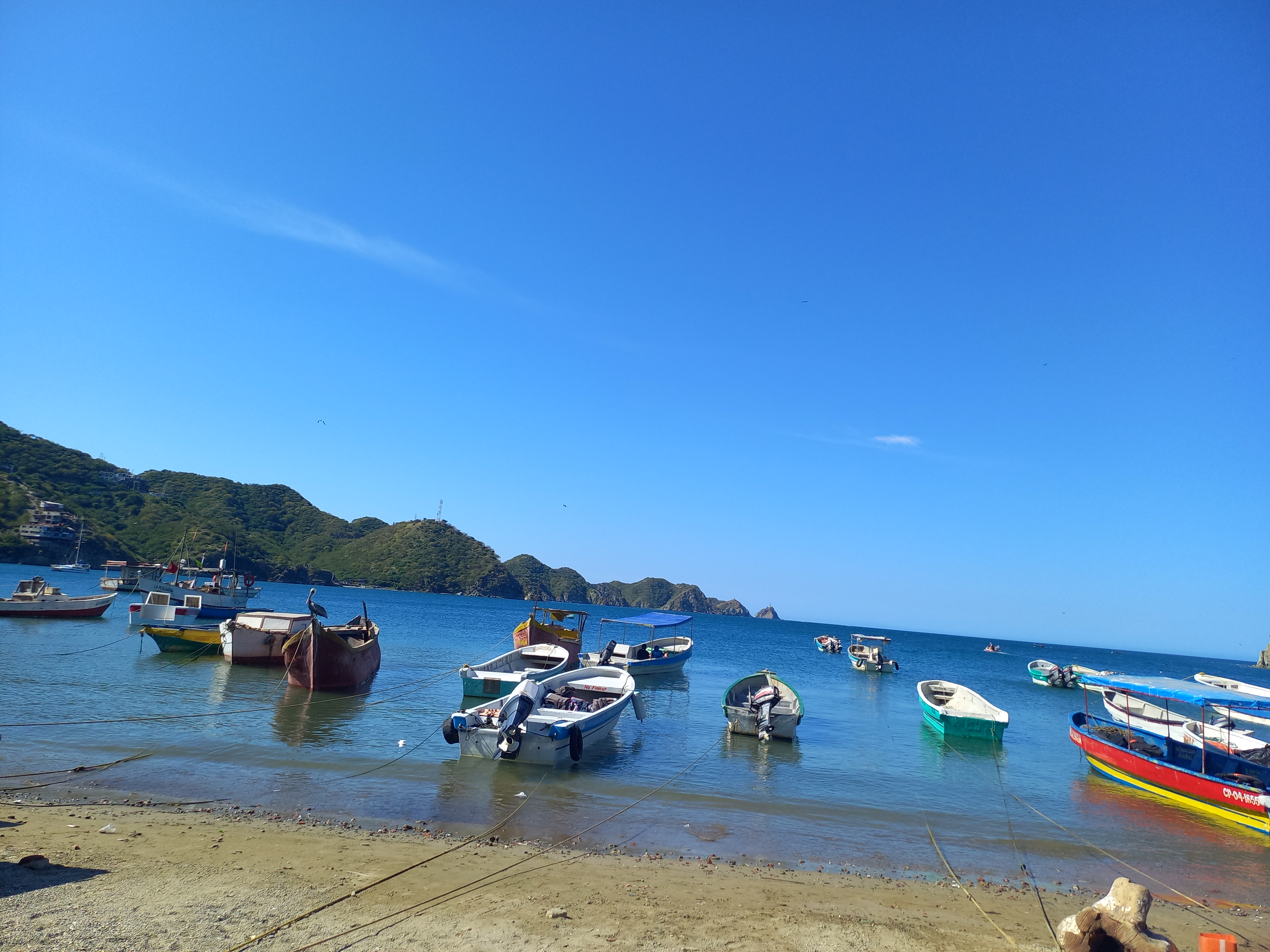
Taganga beach

According to the World Wide Fund for Nature, in the Magdalena Department 8 different distinct ecoregions are found in its territory.

Ecoregion	Biome
Magdalena Valley montane forests	Neotropical tropical and subtropical moist broadleaf forests
Magdalena–Urabá moist forests	Neotropical tropical and subtropical moist broadleaf forests
Sinú Valley dry forests	Neotropical tropical and subtropical moist broadleaf forests
Santa Marta montane forests	Neotropical tropical and subtropical moist broadleaf forests
Santa Marta páramo	Neotropical montane grasslands and shrublands
Magdalena Valley dry forests	Neotropical tropical and subtropical dry broadleaf forests
Guajira–Barranquilla xeric scrub	Neotropical deserts and xeric shrublands
Magdalena–Santa Marta mangroves	Neotropical mangrove

== Politics ==
=== Administrative divisions ===
The Department of Magdalena is subdivided into 30 municipalities and one district. The municipalities are governed by a democratically elected municipal mayor and a municipal council. The Touristic, Cultural and Historic District of Santa Marta is administered by the Municipality of Santa Marta and has special distinction within the country.

==== Municipalities ====
1. Algarrobo
2. Aracataca
3. Ariguaní
4. Cerro San Antonio
5. Chibolo
6. Ciénaga
7. Concordia
8. El Banco
9. El Piñón
10. El Retén
11. Fundación
12. Guamal
13. Nueva Granada
14. Pedraza
15. Pinto
16. Pijiño
17. Pivijay
18. Plato
19. Pueblo Viejo
20. Remolino
21. Sabanas de San Ángel
22. Salamina
23. San Sebastián de Buenavista
24. Santa Ana
25. Santa Marta
26. San Zenón
27. Sitionuevo
28. Tenerife
29. Zapayán
30. Zona Bananera

== Tourism ==
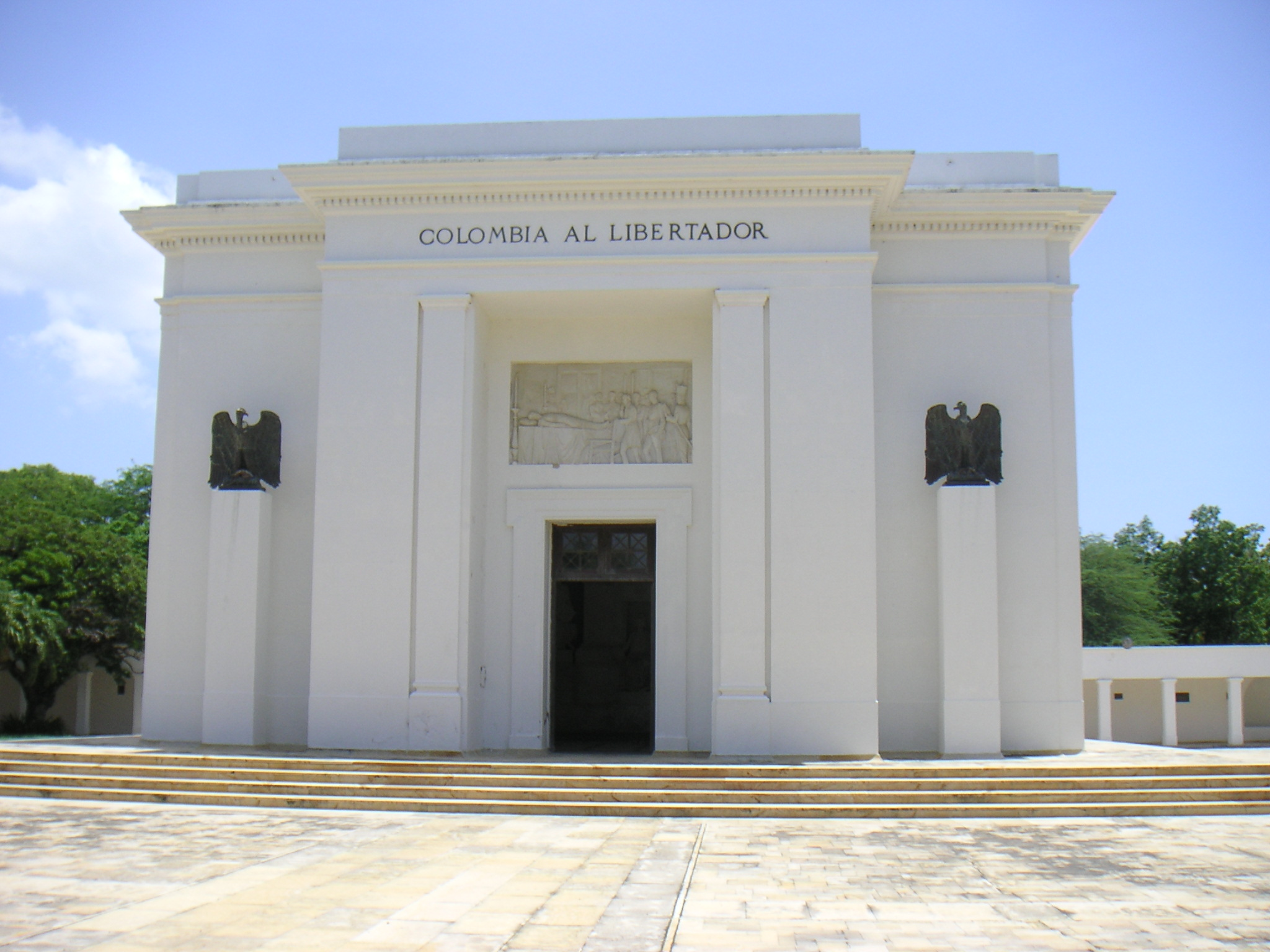
The Quinta de San Pedro Alejandrino, Simón Bolívar's death place.

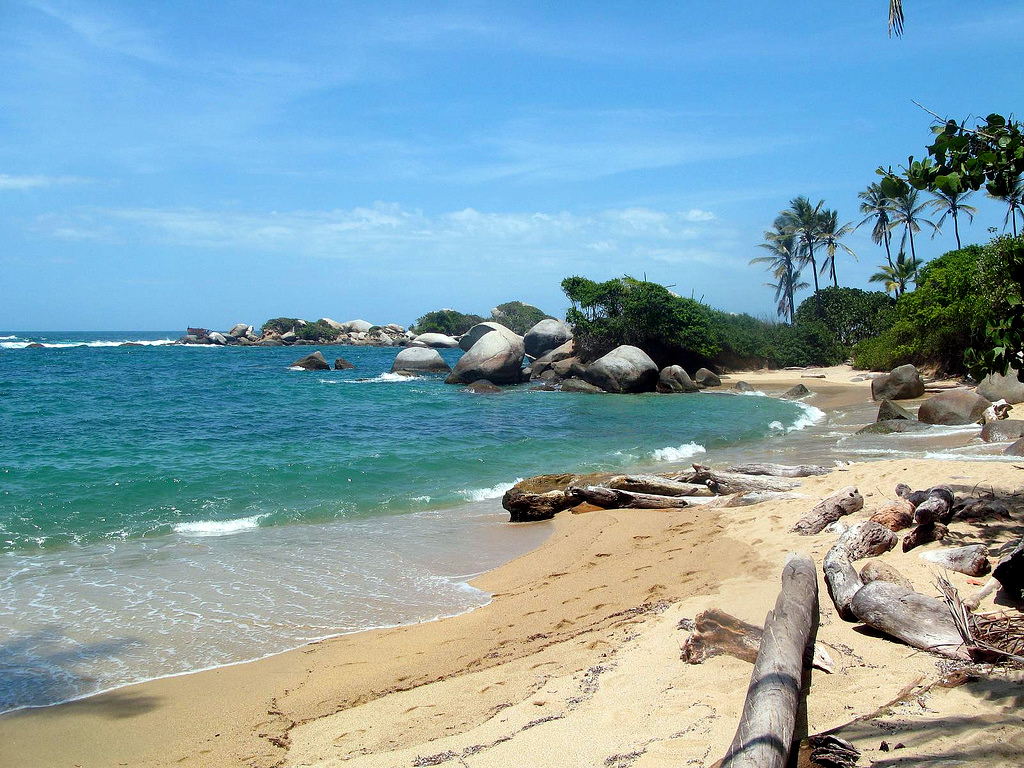
The Tayrona National Natural Park, a unique ecosystem.

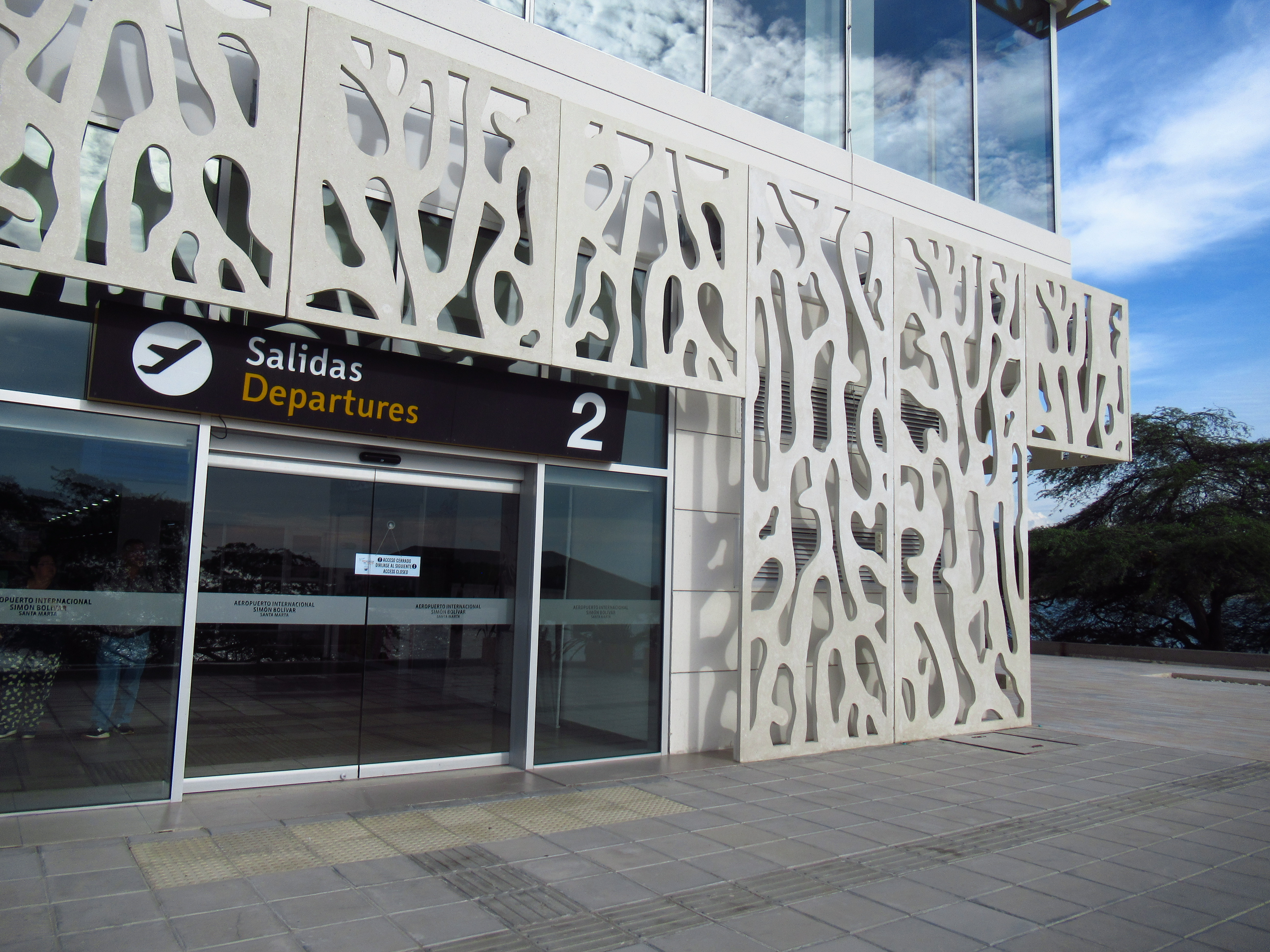
Simón Bolívar International Airport

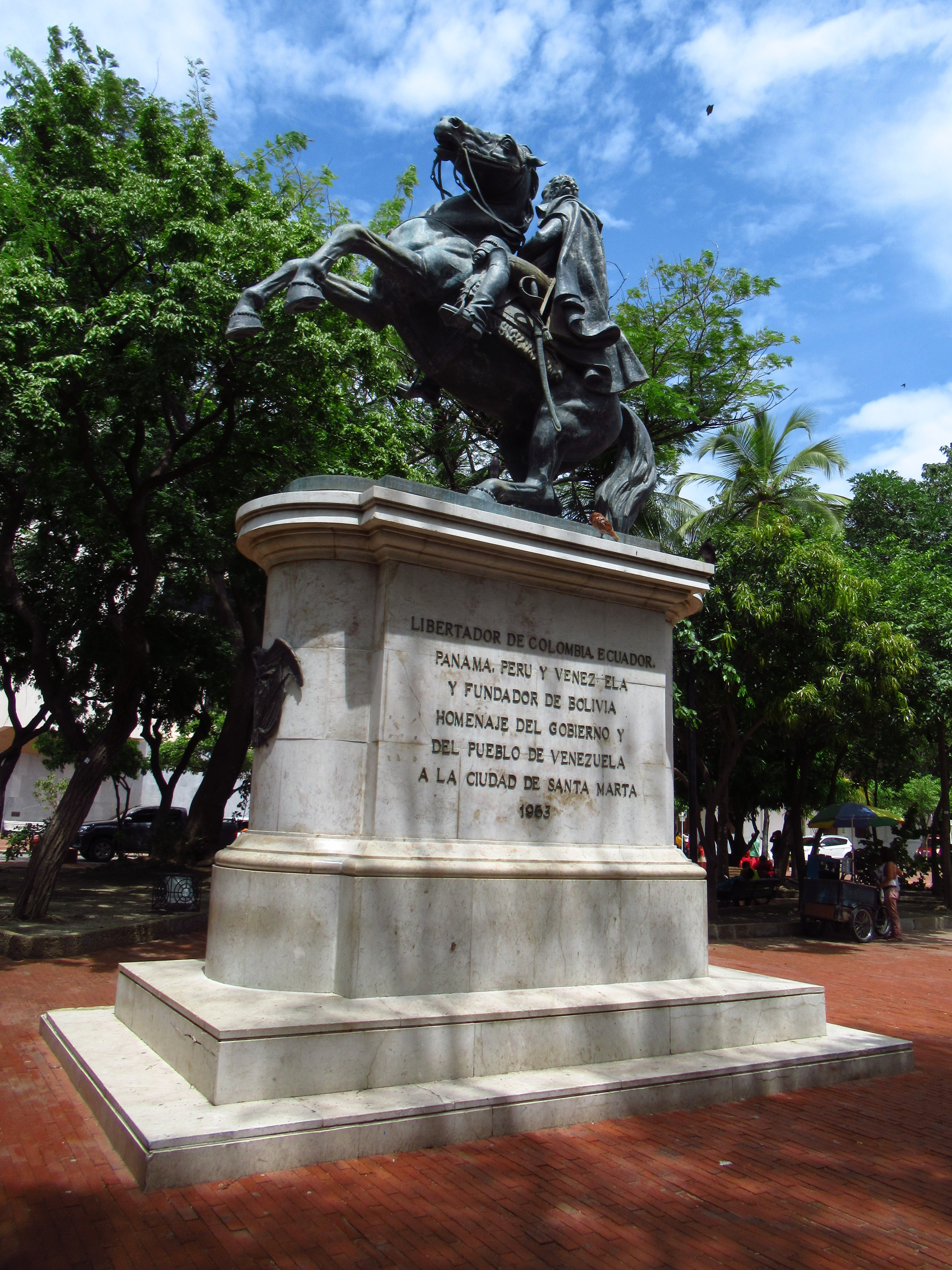
Equestrian statue of Simón Bolívar

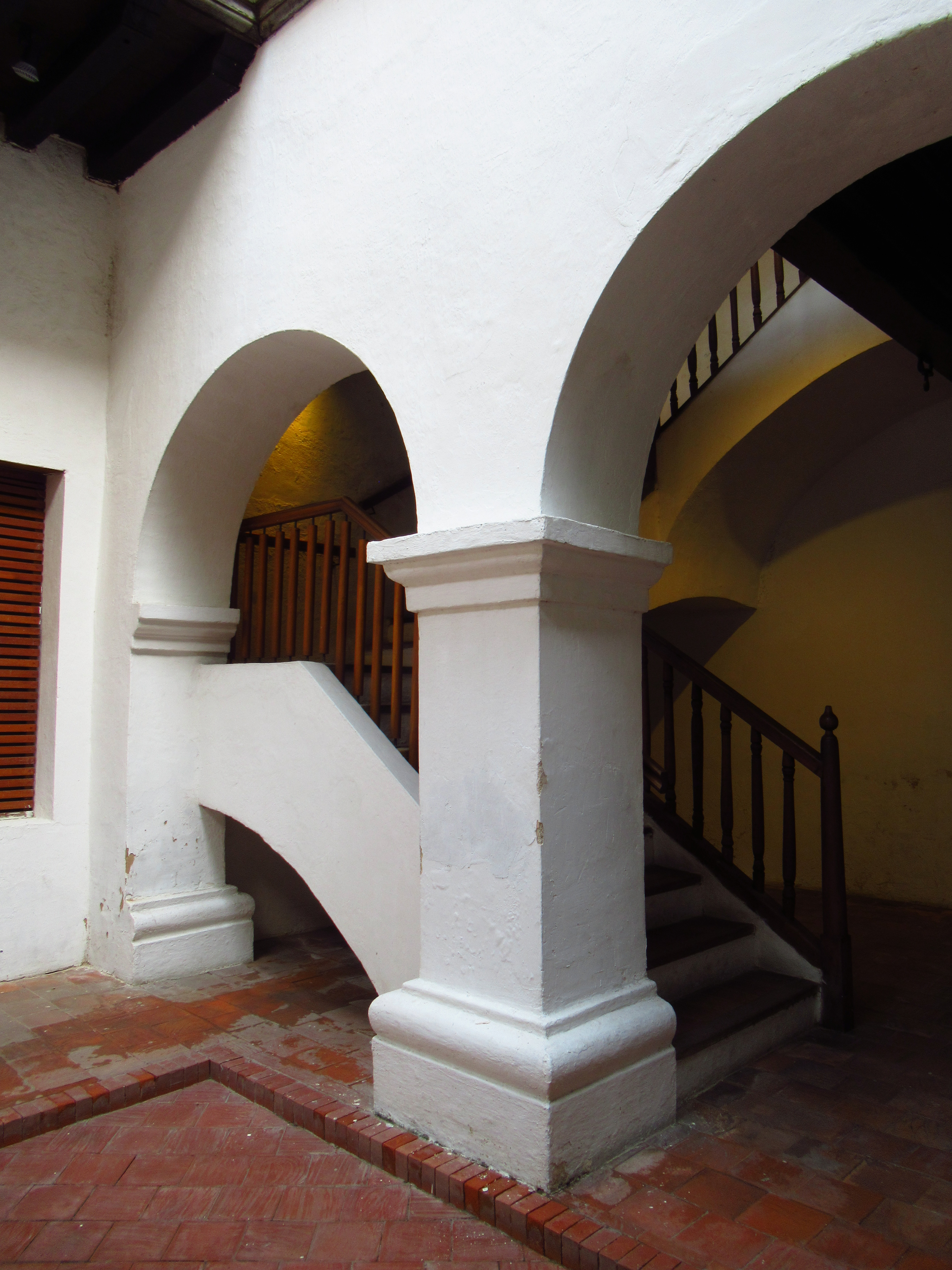
Casa de la Aduana

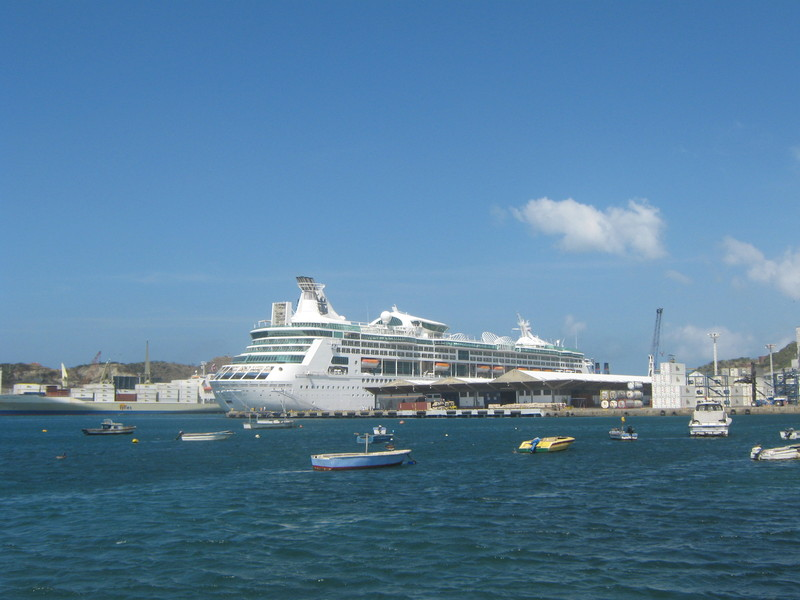
Santa Marta Port
- Gold Museum
- Casa de la Aduana
- Simón Bolívar National Memorial
- Quinta de San Pedro Alejandrino (National Sanctuary and Museum)
- Touristic, Cultural and Historic District of Santa Marta
- Ciudad Perdida (World Heritage Site)
- Ciénaga Grande de Santa Marta (flora and fauna sanctuary)
- Isla de Salamanca (natural monument)
- Sierra Nevada de Santa Marta National Park
- Tayrona National Natural Park

== Sports ==
- Unión Magdalena Football Team that until c. 2005 that did not make the cut and was sent to the Colombian second division (Primera B). The team is nicknamed "el ciclón bananero" (The Banana Cyclone).

== Flag ==
The flag of the department consists of six horizontal bands, alternately red and blue, on which is a five-pointed star made up of 30 small white stars to represent the department's 29 component municipalities and one district.
