= Cazuela de mariscos =

Colombian seafood stew

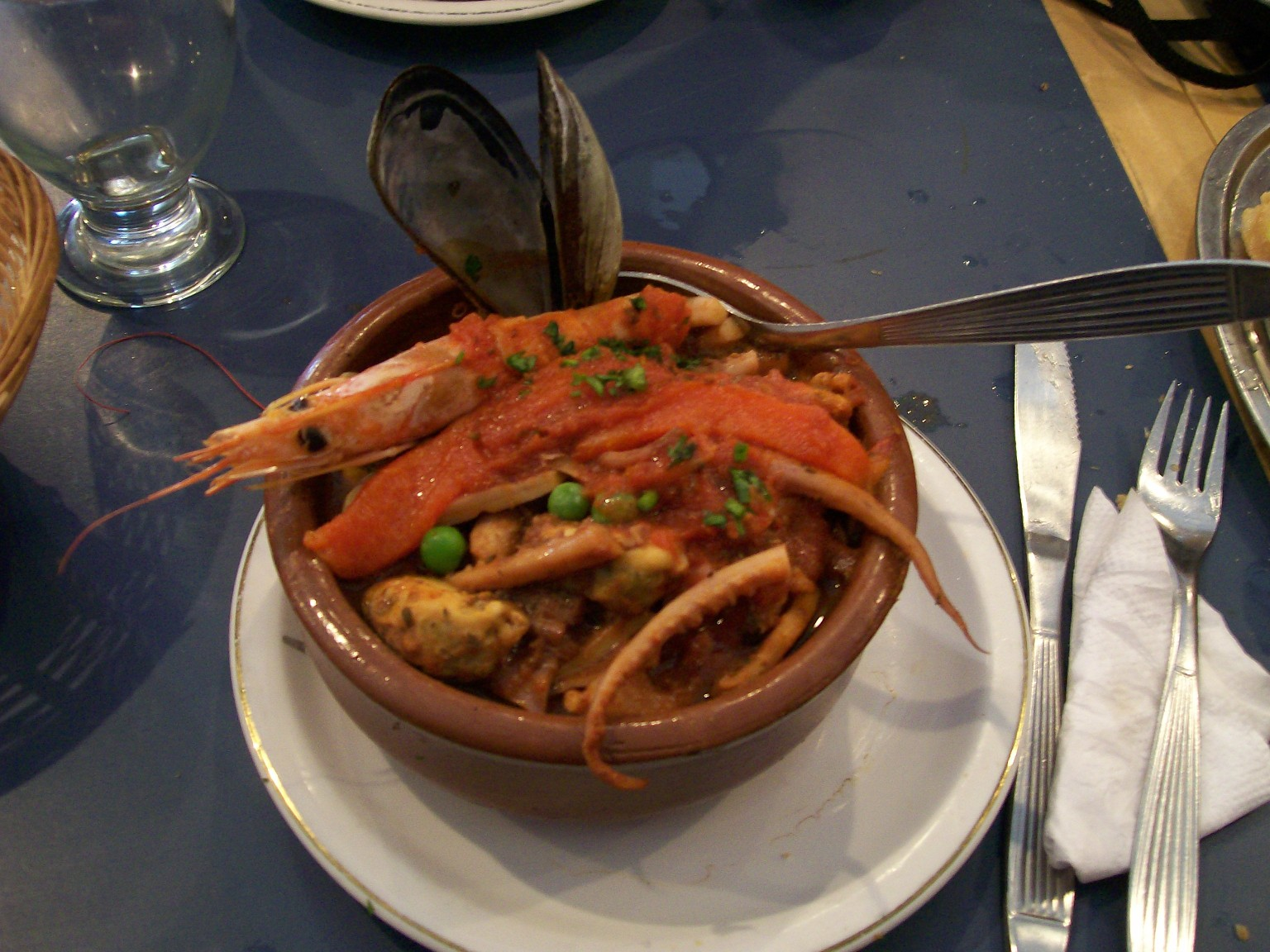
- Cazuela de mariscos
- Place of origin: Colombia
- Main ingredients: Seafood, vegetable, spices, coconut milk

Cazuela de mariscos is a popular seafood stew from the Caribbean region of Colombia (especially Cartagena, Barranquilla and Santa Marta). Its preparation, as well as its ingredients, tend to vary slightly in different regions. It may have been influenced by the Catalonia region in Spain.

It includes ingredients such as lobster, prawns, shrimp, fish, clams, squid, fried vegetable stew (onion, carrot, pepper, tomato and spices) and optionally cream, white wine and Parmesan cheese (if grated), all cooked in coconut milk.

To prepare the dish, the clams need to be steamed with water, stirred well so that they are evenly heated, and then removed. The water can be strained through a fine cloth to remove any sand and then reserved. Meat is removed from the clams that have opened. Prawns and shrimp are cooked in hot water for a few minutes, removed and peeled. Then, the prawns, shrimp, clams, and fish are baked for several minutes in the oven and placed in the broth with tomato paste and the reserved clam broth and simmered for several minutes. Once the desired consistency is obtained, wine can then be added and cooked down. The dish can be served in black clay pots that are heated in the oven or on the fire. Cream can also be added.
