= Chibolo =

Coordinates: 10°01′34″N 74°37′16″W

- town
- Flag

- Location of the municipality and town of Chibolo in the Department of Magdalena.
- Country: Colombia
- Region: Caribbean
- Department: Magdalena
- Foundation: 1820

Area
  - Total: 619 km^{2} (239 sq mi)

Population (Census 2018)
  - Total: 18,208
  - Density: 29.4/km^{2} (76.2/sq mi)
- Time zone: UTC−5
- Website: www.chibolo-magdalena.gov.co

Chibolo (sometimes spelled Chivolo) is a town and municipality of the Colombian Department of Magdalena. Chibolo was founded in 1820 and became a municipality on March 8, 1974. Its economy is based on farming, but also holds attractions like the historic church of Saint Catherine of Alexandria (Iglesia Santa Catalina de Alejandría) and the Santa Catalina Plaza (Saint Catherine Plaza). Chibolo celebrated Carnivals, the Christian Holy Week, Day of Maria Auxiliadora every May 24, Virgen del Carmen, Saint Judas Thaddeus, town celebration of Saint Catherine of Alexandria on December 25.

- Population : 18,584
  - Rural: 7,614
  - Urban: 10,970
- Area: 528 km².
  - Elevation: 26 meters, with higher elevation reaching less than 100 meters
  - Physical characteristics: river valleys and some small hills.
- Agriculture: Livestock raising, yuca, and corn
- Points of interest:
  - Church of Santa Catalina de Alejandría
  - Los Pocitos (Lloradera)
  - Plaza de Santa Catalina.
  - Quebrado la Chimicuica

== Corregimientos ==
- La China
- La Estrella
- Pueblo Nuevo
