= German-occupied Poland (disambiguation) =

German-occupied Poland can refer to:

- General Government
- Polish areas annexed by Nazi Germany
- Occupation of Poland (1939–1945)
- Prussian Partition
