= Quinta de San Pedro Alejandrino =

Estate in Colombia

Coordinates: 11°13′41″N 74°10′45″W

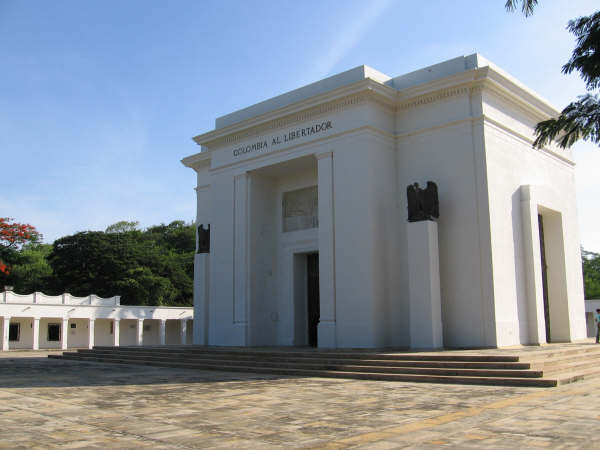
Monument at La Quinta de San Pedro Alejandrino.

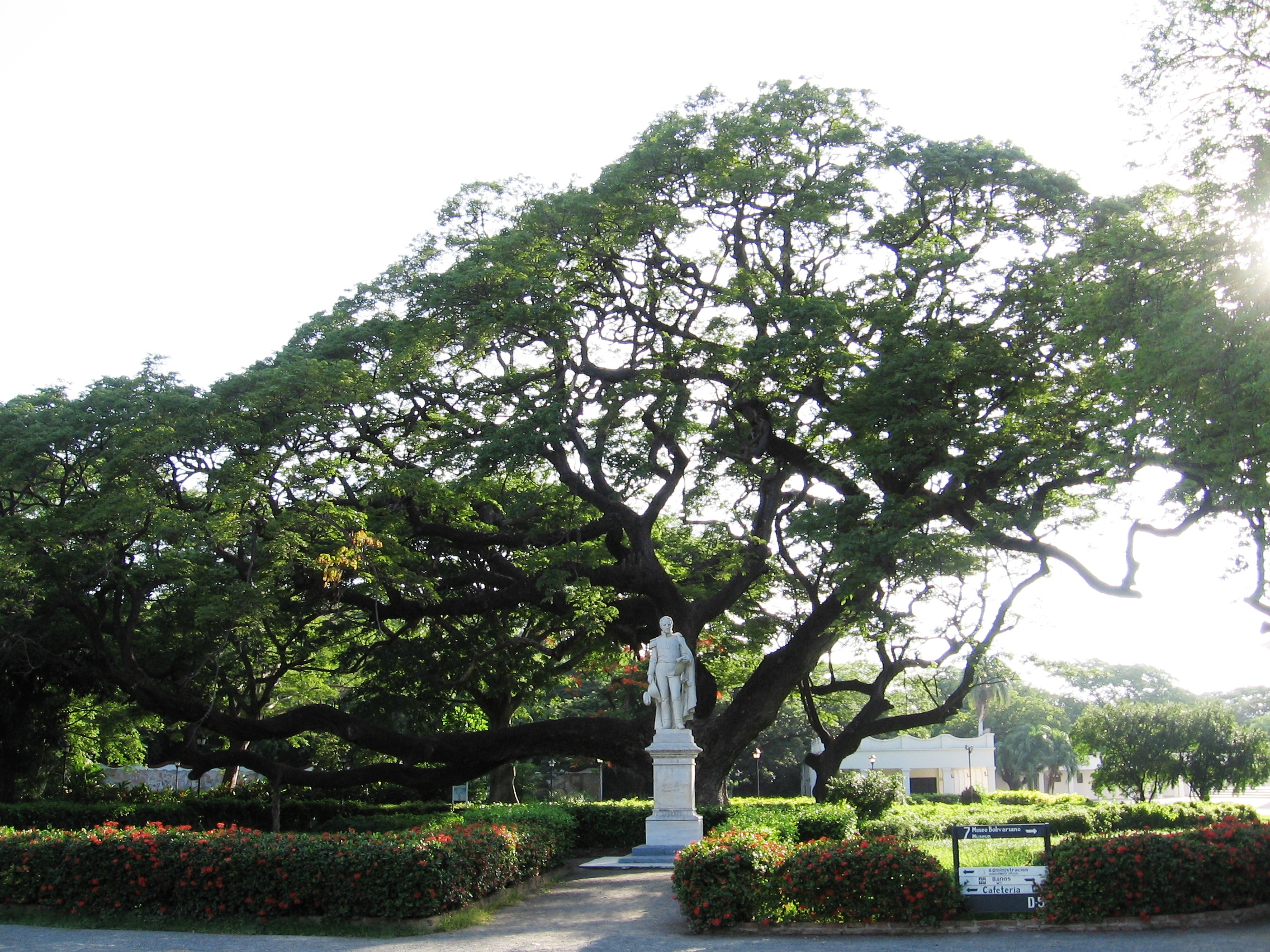
Statue of Simón Bolívar in La Quinta de San Pedro Alejandrino.

The Quinta de San Pedro Alejandrino (English: Quinta of Saint Peter of Alexandria) is an hacienda or quinta built in 1608, famous for being the death place of Simón Bolívar on December 17, 1830. The hacienda is located in the corregimiento of Mamatoco within the tourist district of Santa Marta, near the Caribbean Sea in northern Colombia.

== History ==
In Bolívar's time, the estate produced rum, honey and panela.

== Modern day ==
Nowadays it functions as a tourist site, museum and historical landmark. There is a small entrance fee for the museum with a discount for children.
