= Caribbean region of Colombia =

Northern part of Colombia

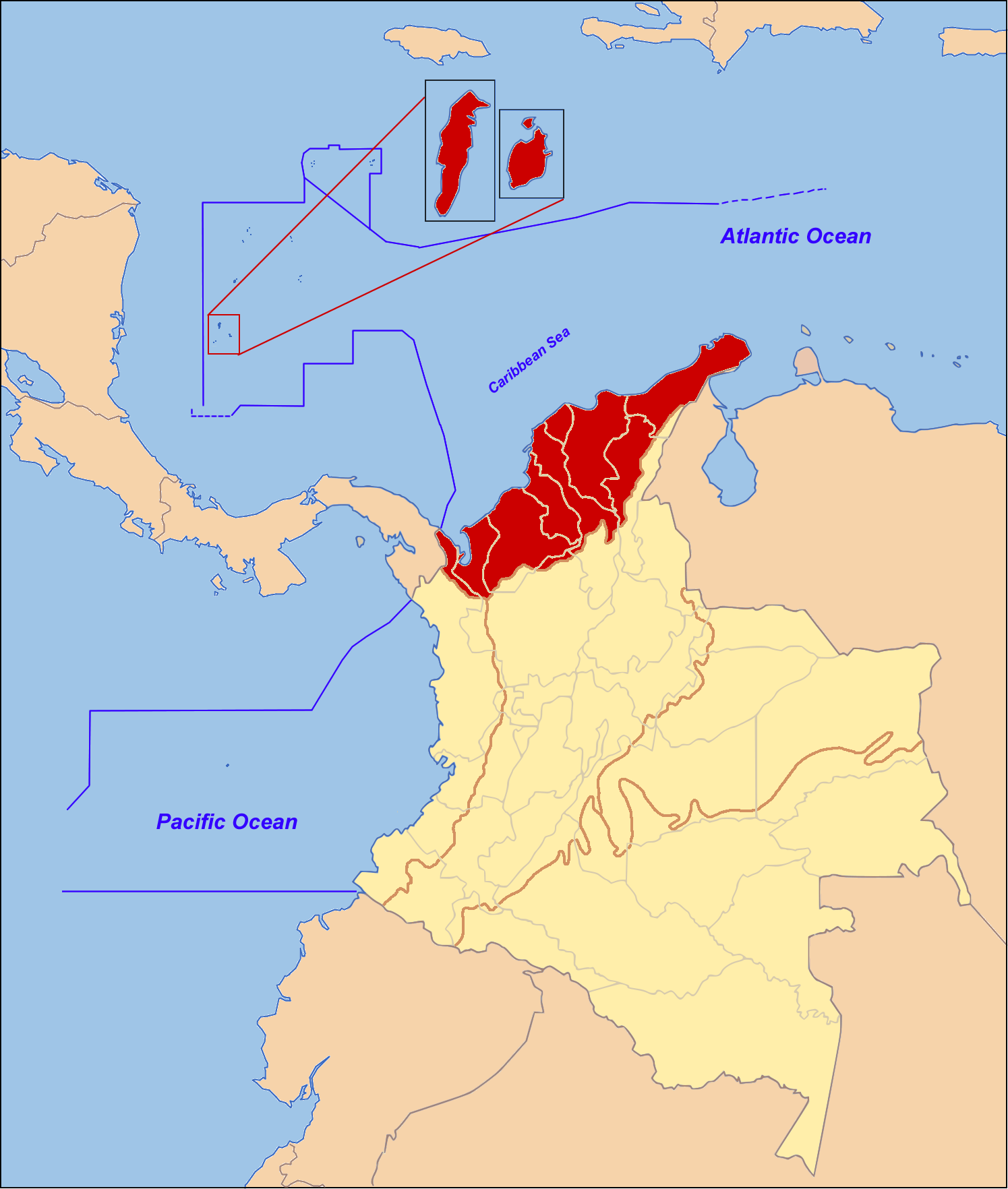
- The Caribbean region detailed in dark red with territorial waters
- Interactive map of Caribbean region of Colombia
- Coordinates: 11°00′N 74°48′W
- Country: Colombia
- Largest city: Barranquilla
- Departments: 8

Area
  - Total: 110,000 km^{2} (42,000 sq mi)

Population (2018)
  - Total: 11,796,624 (Note: Not counting the Antioquia and Chocó departments)

The Caribbean Region (Spanish: Región Caribe) or Colombian Caribbean (Spanish: Caribe Colombiano) is the northern, coastal region of Colombia located contiguous to the Caribbean Sea. It is mainly composed of 8 departments. It is the second most populated region in the country after the Andean Region, with approximately 11 million residents according to the 2018 Colombian Census. The area covers a total land area of 110,000 km^{2} (42,000 sq mi), including the Archipelago of San Andrés, Providencia and Santa Catalina in the Caribbean Sea.

The Caribbean Region coast extends from the Gulf of Urabá to the Gulf of Venezuela. Straddling the coast are Colombia's two main Atlantic port cities of Barranquilla and Cartagena. The administration of the region is covered by eight department governments: Atlántico, Bolívar, Cesar, Sucre, Córdoba, Magdalena, La Guajira, and San Andrés and Providencia. These eight departments also cover approximately 182 municipalities according to the 2018 Census by DANE Colombia. Most of its inhabitants speak a dialect of Caribbean Spanish with variations within its subregions.

== Administrative divisions ==
Eight departments form the Caribbean region:

Department	Capital
Atlántico Department; Bolívar Department; Cesar Department; Córdoba Department; La Guajira Department; Magdalena Department; Sucre Department; San Andrés and Providencia	Barranquilla; Cartagena; Valledupar; Montería; Riohacha; Santa Marta; Sincelejo; San Andrés

Partial territory pertaining to:

- Antioquia Department: in the Gulf of Urabá most of the territory of the subregion of Urabá Antioquia.
- Chocó Department: covering a small territory in the Gulf of Urabá. Chocó is the only Department of Colombia with coasts on both the Atlantic and Pacific oceans.

Citys

Like the rest of Colombia, the Caribbean Region has a well-articulated network of cities, two of which are among the six largest in the country: Barranquilla, the largest and most populous city of the Colombian Caribbean and the fourth largest in the country, with approximately 1,769,339 inhabitants in its metropolitan area, which includes the municipality of Soledad (683,486 inhabitants); and Cartagena, with approximately 892,545 inhabitants. Both are important urban centers with developed industry and first-rate transportation, communications, and commerce infrastructure.

These are followed by Santa Marta, notable for its port, university, sports, tourism, scientific, cultural, and industrial facilities, with a population of nearly 400,000; Montería and Valledupar, similar in size and population at around 350,000 inhabitants, which are important agro-industrial, cattle-ranching, and cultural centers. Both cities are currently in a period of economic and demographic expansion, with the highest population growth rates in the region; and Sincelejo and Riohacha, each also with populations of around 200,000. Aguachica and Apartadó complete the network of primary cities.

The rest of the urban system is made up of riverside towns and other agricultural communities scattered throughout the region, such as Caucasia, Magangué, El Carmen de Bolívar, Maicao, El Banco, and Santa Cruz de Lorica.

== Demographics ==
It is considered the only tri-racial region of Colombia, giving it the status of the most diverse and mixed region in the country, as the predominant ethnic group in the region is the Pardo, a mixture of White European (mainly Spanish), Indigenous, and Afro-Colombian peoples, unlike other regions of Colombia, such as the Andean Region and Orinoquia Region, where White European, Castizo, and Mestizo ethnic groups are prevalent, whereas Afro-Colombians are prevalent in the Pacific/Chocó Region. During the 19th and 20th century, a wave of immigrants came from Europe and the Middle East, mostly from France, Germany, Ireland, Italy, Lebanon, Palestine, Portugal, Spain, and Syria. A second wave of immigrants followed during World War II from other European countries, such as Armenia, Austria, Belgium, Croatia, Hungary, Lithuania, the Netherlands, Poland, Romania, Russia, Ukraine, and Jewish people from other countries affected by the war.

The two most populous Indigenous ethnic groups are the Wayuu in the Guajira Peninsula and the Arhuacos and Koguis in the Sierra Nevada de Santa Marta. The Afro-Colombian population is mostly concentrated near Cartagena predominantly in the town of San Basilio de Palenque, which was proclaimed Masterpiece of the Oral and Intangible Heritage of Humanity by the UNESCO for preserving its African heritage.

Population according to 2018 Census Report by DANE
Department	2018 Census	2005 Census	Capital
Atlántico	2,835,509	2,112,001	Barranquilla
Bolívar	2,258,929	1,836,640	Cartagena de Indias
Cesar	1,359,719	878,437	Valledupar
Córdoba	1,868,166	1,462,909	Montería
La Guajira	1,015,909	655,943	Riohacha
Magdalena	1,476,665	1,136,819	Santa Marta
San Andrés and Providencia	65,663	55,426	San Andrés
Sucre	981,727	762,263	Sincelejo
Total Caribbean	11,796,624	8,900,438	

== Economy ==
The economy of the Caribbean region is based mainly in the exploitation of natural resources such as coal and natural gas, salt, agricultural products mainly bananas, coffee, oil palm, cotton, and tropical fruits among many other products, livestock raising which is practiced extensively in almost all the territory, in Córdoba, Sucre, Atlántico, Magdalena, Bolívar, Cesar and southern La Guajira. There is also a service industry and a local import-export industry, mainly in the ports of Cartagena, Barranquilla, and Santa Marta. Another major part of the economy is tourism, which concentrates also in Cartagena and Santa Marta along with San Andres and Providencia Islands.

== Culture ==
=== Sports ===
Unlike the rest of the country where soccer predominates, baseball is the most popular sport in the Caribbean region, with teams such as Caimanes de Barranquilla, Tigres de Cartagena, Vaqueros de Montería, Leones de Barranquilla, and Toros de Sincelejo competing in the Colombian Professional Baseball League. Many successful professional baseball players were born in the Caribbean region, Édgar Rentería, St. Louis Cardinals hall of famer, in addition to other successful Major League players and even world champions with the Colombia national baseball team at the already extinct Amateur World Series such as Orlando Cabrera, Petaca Rodríguez, Orlando Ramírez, Joaquin Gutierrez, Gio Urshela, Julio Teherán, José Quintana, Dayan Díaz, Donovan Solano, Nabil Crismatt, Ernesto Frieri, Jorge Alfaro, Jordan Díaz, Harold Ramírez, or Didier Fuentes. It is the most followed, loved and practiced sports discipline in most of the region, more specifically in the cities of Cartagena, Montería, Sincelejo, and many municipalities in the subregion of Urabá Antioquia, where the "king of sports" is baseball. It has a traditional game of more than 110 years called "bate tapita" (name it receives in Cartagena), "tapilla" (name it receives in Montería) or "checa" (name it receives in Barranquilla, Sincelejo, and Riohacha). This variant game of baseball contains a long, thin wooden stick, like a bat, and a metal cap like a ball.

On the other hand, soccer is another sport that grew significantly to become one of the most popular sports in this Caribbean area, the second most popular sport now, with teams such as Junior de Barranquilla, Unión Magdalena, Real Cartagena, or Jaguares de Córdoba competing in the first and second divisions of the country. The Caribbean region has been the birthplace of successful soccer players, many of them world-renowned such as Carlos Valderrama, Radamel Falcao, Teófilo Gutiérrez, and Carlos Bacca.

The region is also known for its love of combat sports. Boxing is a popular sport in certain areas and the region has given rise to numerous world champions, such as Antonio Cervantes (one of the most important athletes in the history of Colombia along with Rentería), Rodrigo Valdez, and Miguel Lora. In some municipalities of Urabá, it is the most popular sport above baseball and soccer, although baseball and soccer are dominant in almost the entire subregion of Urabá. Traditionally along with baseball, it was one of the two most popular sports.

=== Music and dance ===
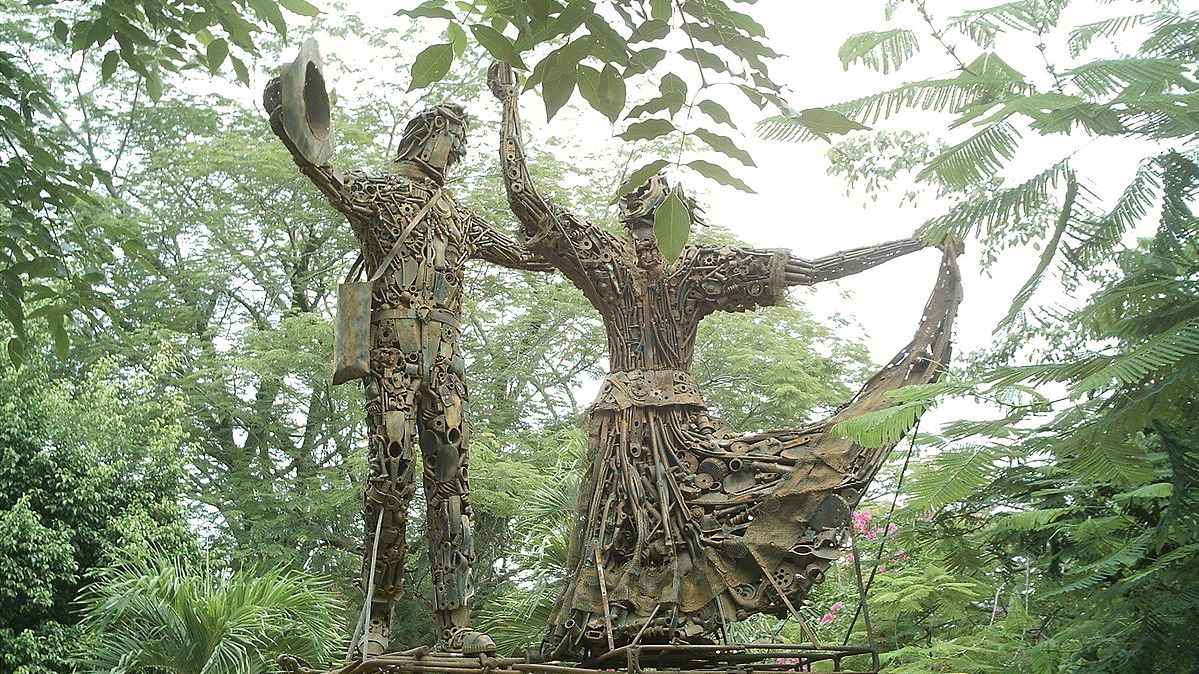
Monument to the dance and music of cumbia

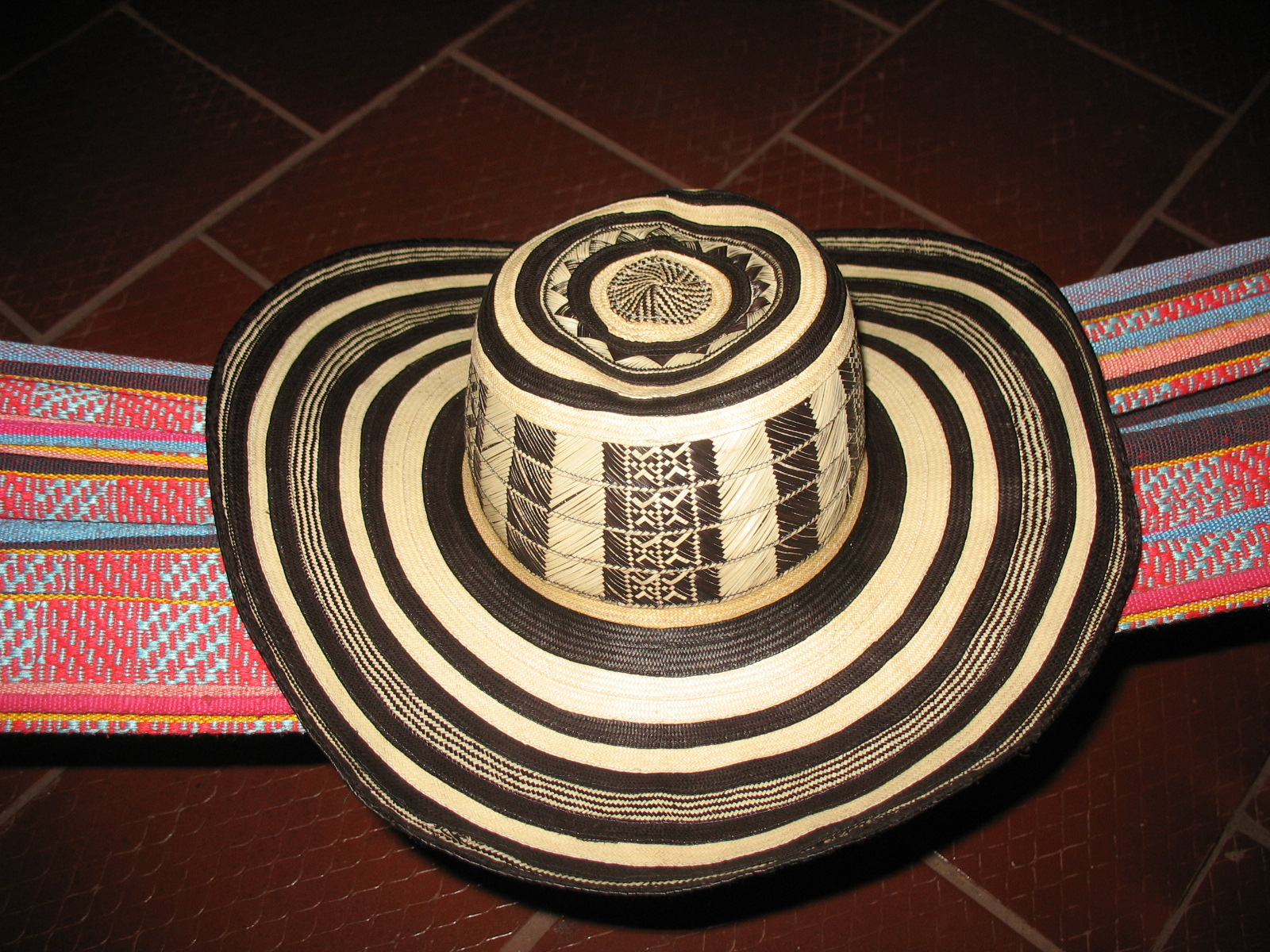
The Sombrero Vueltiao is the most representative element of the Caribbean region of Colombia, it was later adopted as a symbol of the national identity of Colombia.

The most popular local rhythms are the cumbia and vallenato however, there is a great musical influence from the rest of the Caribbean nations with salsa, merengue, porro, more recently reggaeton and many Afro-Caribbean rhythms. This influence also developed champeta, a genre which has similarities with reggaeton. Traditional dances are mostly of Afro-Colombian origins, such as cumbia and mapalé.

=== Myth and legend ===
The Caribbean region has a rich tradition of myths and legends that include La Llorona, El Hombre Caimán, La Ciguapa, the Vallenato Legend, La Madre Monte, El Simborcito, la Mojana Legend, El Lucio, etc.

=== Celebrations ===
The most popular and known celebration in the Caribbean region is the Carnival of Barranquilla celebrated every year in February or March. The Miss Colombia Pageant in Cartagena, the Vallenato Legend Festival in Valledupar, the Feast of the Sea in Santa Marta, and the Corralejas Festivities in Sincelejo.

=== Food ===
The typical food of the Caribbean region varies according to the geographical location. In the sabanas, the typical meal is the sancocho made with rabo (cow's tail) and accompanied with coconut rice. In the coast, the typical meal is fish, sometimes fried or sometimes cooked in coconut milk. A popular soup is also prepared with the head of the tarpon, yuca, plantain, coconut milk, lime, and salt. The arepa is also a popular dish with numerous variations like arepa limpia (plain arepa), arepa e' queso (arepa with cheese) and arepa e'huevo (arepa with egg). Cazuela de mariscos, a seafood stew, is also a typical dish found in the region.

== See also ==
- Caribbean Community (CARICOM)
- Caribbean South America
- Colombia–Panama border
- Colombia–Venezuela border
- History of Colombia
  - Spanish American wars of independence
  - Spanish colonization of the Americas
  - Viceroyalty of New Spain
- Natural regions of Colombia
  - Caribbean natural region
  - La Mojana, large area of wetlands, inland river delta
  - Pacific Region of Colombia
