= Natural regions of Colombia =

Natural Regions of Colombia

Because of its natural structure, Colombia can be divided into six distinct natural regions. These consist of the Andean Region, covering the three branches of the Andes mountains found in Colombia; the Caribbean Region, covering the area adjacent to the Caribbean Sea; the Pacific Region adjacent to the Pacific Ocean; the Orinoquía Region, part of the Llanos plains mainly in the Orinoco river basin along the border with Venezuela; the Amazon Region, part of the Amazon rainforest; and finally the Insular Region, comprising the islands in both the Atlantic and Pacific Oceans. Colombia is located in South America.

== Andean Region ==
The Andes mountains form the most populous region of Colombia and contain the majority of the country's urban centres. They were also the location of the most significant pre-Columbian Indigenous settlement. Beyond the Colombian Massif in the south-western departments of Cauca and Nariño, the Colombian Andes divide into three branches known as "cordilleras" (from the Spanish for rope): the Cordillera Occidental, running adjacent to the Pacific coast and including the city of Cali; the Cordillera Central, running up the centre of the country between the Cauca and Magdalena river valleys (to the west and east respectively) and including the cities of Medellín, Manizales and Pereira; and the Cordillera Oriental and Perijá Mountains, extending north-east towards the Guajira Peninsula, and including Bogotá, Bucaramanga and Cúcuta.

The climate and vegetation of the region vary considerably according to altitude, but as a general rule the land can be divided into the tierra caliente (hot land) of river valleys and basins below 1,000 metres (3,300 ft); the more temperate conditions of the tierra templada (temperate land, approximately 1,000 to 2,000 m (3,300 to 6,600 ft)) and tierra fría (cold land, 2,000 to 3,000 m (6,600 to 9,800 ft)), which include the most productive land and the majority of the population; and the alpine conditions of the zona forestada (forested zone, 3,200 to 3,900 m (10,500 to 12,800 ft)), páramos (3,900 to 4,600 m (12,800 to 15,100 ft)) and tierra helada (frozen land, 4,600 m (15,100 ft) and above).

== Caribbean Region ==
The Caribbean Region covers 132,218 km^{2} (51,050 sq mi) adjacent to the Caribbean Sea, stretching from the Gulf of Urabá in the west to the Guajira Peninsula in the east and including some or all of the departments of Guajira, Bolívar, Atlántico, Cesar, Magdalena, Sucre, Córdoba, Santander and Antioquia.

The region is traversed by a number of rivers heading from the Andean highlands to the sea, including Colombia's principal river, the Magdalena, which disgorges at the main port of Barranquilla. As the area first settled by Europeans, the Caribbean region is also the location of the historic port cities of Santa Marta and Cartagena. However, whilst generally low-lying and humid, the region also includes the Sierra Nevada de Santa Marta mountain range and the Guajira Desert.

== Pacific Region ==
The Pacific Region is located on Colombia's western, Pacific coast, and covers an area of 83,170 km^{2} (32,110 sq mi). It extends from the Gulf of Urabá in the north to the border with Ecuador in the south, and includes part of the departments of Nariño, Cauca and Valle de Cauca, and the whole of Chocó Department.

Its high humidity distinguishes this region. Precipitation is among the highest in the world, with an average of 4,000 mm (160 in) per year and some areas that receive as much as 12,000 mm (470 in) per year. These high levels of precipitation support a number of rivers, including the Atrato River, San Juan River, Patía River, Baudó River and Mira River. The population of the region is mainly Afro-Colombian (it also includes several Indigenous settlements), and the economy is based on mining (gold and platinum), timber, fishing, cattle raising and agriculture (particularly the cultivation of borojo, banana and plantain). Buenaventura is Colombia's main Pacific port.

== Orinoco Region ==
Also known as the Oriental Plains from the Spanish Llanos Orientales, the Orinoco Region (Spanish: Región de la Orinoquía) covers most of the area of the departments of Meta, Arauca, Casanare and Vichada. The region is rich in oil and suitable for extensive ranching but sparsely populated.

== Amazon Region ==
The Amazon Region is a region in southern Colombia over the Amazon Basin. It comprises the departments of Amazonas, Caquetá, Guainía, Putumayo, Guaviare and Vaupés.

== Insular Region ==
The Insular Region is considered by some as a sixth region, comprising those areas outside continental Colombia, including the department of San Andrés y Providencia in the Caribbean Sea and the islands of Malpelo and Gorgona in the Pacific Ocean. However, cultural ties are with the respective coastlines.
