= Women in telegraphy =

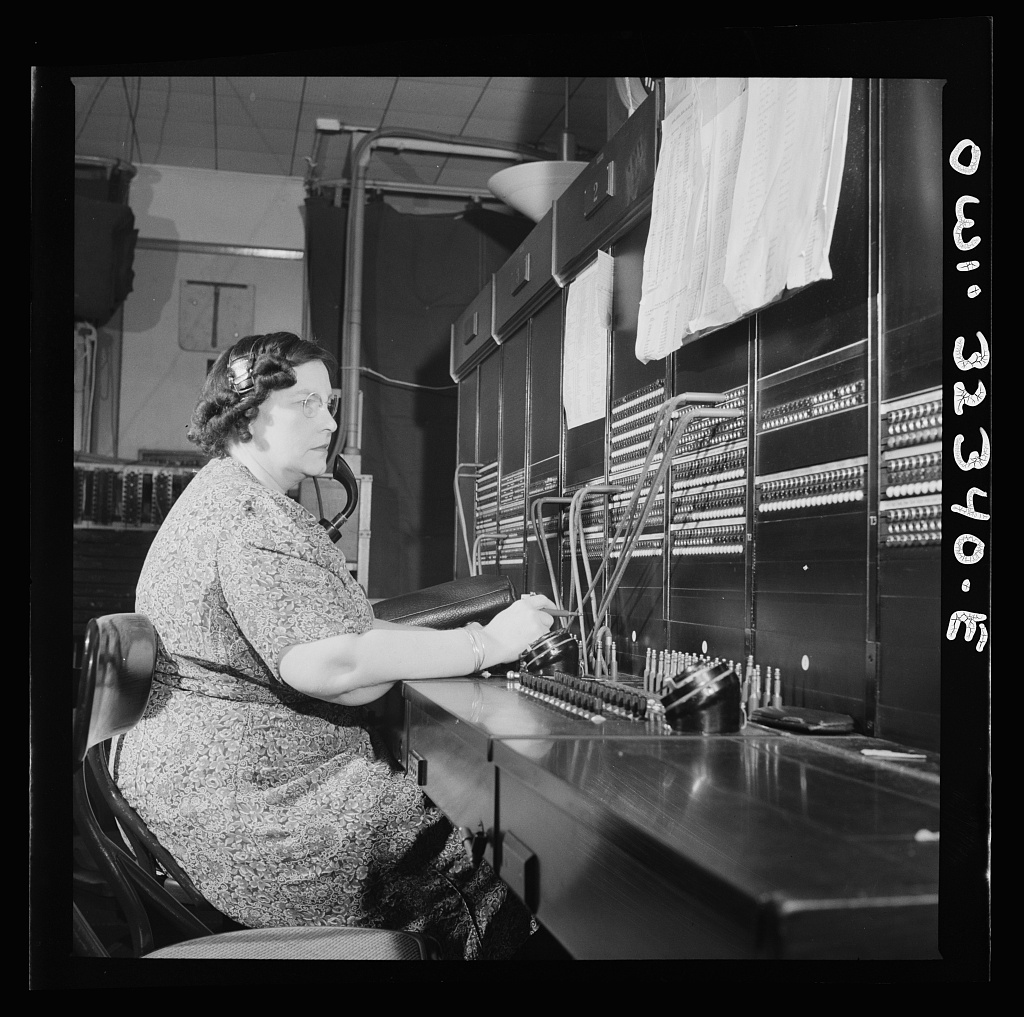
Miss Ethel Wakefield, a Western Union telegraph PBX operator, pictured in 1943.

Women in telegraphy have been evident since the 1840s. The introduction of practical systems of telegraphy in the 1840s led to the creation of a new occupational category, the telegrapher, telegraphist or telegraph operator. Duties of the telegrapher included sending and receiving telegraphic messages, known as telegrams, using a variety of signaling systems, and routing of trains for the railroads. Telegraphy was one of the first communications technology fields open to women, and women were employed as telegraph operators from the industry's earliest days.

== United States ==
Demonstration of a successful system for sending telegraphic messages by Samuel F. B. Morse in 1844 quickly led to the development of a telegraphic network in the eastern United States, constructed and maintained by a number of private companies. Operation of this network required skilled operators at each station, capable of sending and receiving messages in Morse code. In the late 1840s, a shortage of qualified operators led to the hiring of women as well as men to fill this role, as the telegraph spread across the country. Sarah Bagley (1806–1889), a women's rights advocate and founder of the Lowell Female Labor Reform Association, became the telegraph operator for Francis Ormand Jonathan Smith's New York and Boston Magnetic Telegraph Company in Lowell, Massachusetts, in 1846. She probably became aware of the telegraph and its potential from her previous work as an editor for the reform newspaper, the Voice of Industry. Phoebe Wood (1816–1891), sister of Morse's associate Ezra Cornell and wife of telegraph entrepreneur Martin B. Wood, became the telegrapher in Albion, Michigan, in 1849, after Cornell's business partner John James Speed pointed out the need for operators in sparsely populated frontier areas.

Initially used to transmit personal messages, business transactions and news reports, the telegraph also began to be used for train routing by the railroads in the 1850s. Elizabeth Cogley (1833–1922) of Lewistown, Pennsylvania, became one of the earliest women to work as a railroad telegrapher when she was hired by the Pennsylvania Railroad in 1855.

A Typical Depot Telegraph Station, 1870s. Source: "The Telegraph," Harper's Magazine, August 1873, 332.

The employment of women in the telegraph industry in the United States increased during the American Civil War as male telegraphers were drafted or joined the U.S. Military Telegraph Corps of the Union army. A few women served in the Military Telegraph Corps. Louisa Volker (1838–1905), the telegraph operator at Mineral Point, Missouri, provided important information on troop movements in her role as Military Telegrapher. After the war, as men returned from the military and competition for jobs arose, male operators began to question the suitability of placing women operators in the telegraph office, and the issue was hotly debated in the telegraph journals. However, when Western Union, the largest telegraph company, opened a telegraph school for women at Cooper Union in 1869 and began to employ large numbers of women, often at lower wages than their male counterparts, the continued presence of women in the industry was assured. According to the U.S. Census, the percentage of telegraphers who were women in the U.S. grew from four percent in 1870 (355 out of 8316 total) to 20% in 1920 (16,860 out of 79,434 total).

== Mexico and Canada ==
Telegraph service in Canada was provided both by private companies and by the Government Telegraph Service (GTS). In Toronto in 1902, 42 percent of the operators at the Great Northwestern Telegraph Company were women. At the offices of the Canadian Pacific Railway in the same city, 28 percent of the operators were female in 1902. The percentage of the workforce that was female was somewhat lower in western Canada. In 1917, 18 percent of the operators in Winnipeg were women. During the First World War, employment on "the Home Front" included women telegraphers; for example, Beamsville, Ontario, which was also the location of an dogfighting (aerial combat) school.

Many telegraphers from the United States came to Mexico to work for the railroads during the administration of Porfirio Diaz (1876–1911), including several American women. Abbie Struble Vaughan (1845–1924) worked for the Mexican National Railroad and the Mexican Central Railroad from 1891 to 1911; "Ma Kiley" (Mattie Collins Brite) (1880–1971) worked as a railroad operator in Mexico from 1902 to 1905.

== Britain and Europe ==
The Central Telegraph Office, London, 1874. Source: Illustrated London News, December 12, 1874.

Women began to work for a number of private telegraph companies in Britain in the 1850s, including the Electric Telegraph Company. The Telegraph School for Women was established in London in 1860. The Queen's Institute for the Training and Employment of Educated Women began classes in telegraphy in Dublin in 1862; its graduates were employed by the British and Irish Magnetic Telegraph Company. Telegraphers in Britain used the Wheatstone-Cooke system of telegraphy as well as Morse code for transmission of messages. The number of women employed as telegraphists increased after the telegraph service was taken over by the British General Post Office in 1870; in that year, 1535 out of 4913, or 31 percent of all operators, were women.

In most of Europe, the telegraph service came under the control of the government posts and telegraph administration. The telegraph administrations of Switzerland and the Scandinavian countries first began to employ women as telegraph operators in the 1850s; France, Germany, and Russia first admitted women to the telegraph service in the 1860s. A French telegrapher, Juliette Dodu (1848–1909), became a heroine of the Franco-Prussian War of 1870 when she reputedly tapped the telegraph lines being used by the Prussian military and passed the information to French military forces. By 1880, 230 of the 624 telegraphers at the Paris Central Telegraphique, or 37 percent, were women.

== Asia, Africa, Australia and South America ==
The construction of the world-wide telegraph network in the late nineteenth century was closely tied to colonialism as the European powers used the telegraph to govern and communicate with their overseas possessions. By the 1870s, a network of land lines and submarine communications cables had telegraphically connected all the inhabited continents.

=== Asia ===
By 1900, women were employed as telegraph operators in Ceylon (Sri Lanka), the Dutch East Indies (Indonesia), French Indochina (Vietnam, Cambodia, and Laos), as well as in Japan. In 1907, women also began to be employed as telegraphists in India and Burma (Myanmar).

=== Africa ===
Women were employed as telegraph operators in the British Cape Colonies (South Africa), the Portuguese colonies (Angola, Mozambique) and French West Africa (Senegal, Mauritania, Guinea, Ivory Coast, Dahomey) by 1900.

=== Australia ===
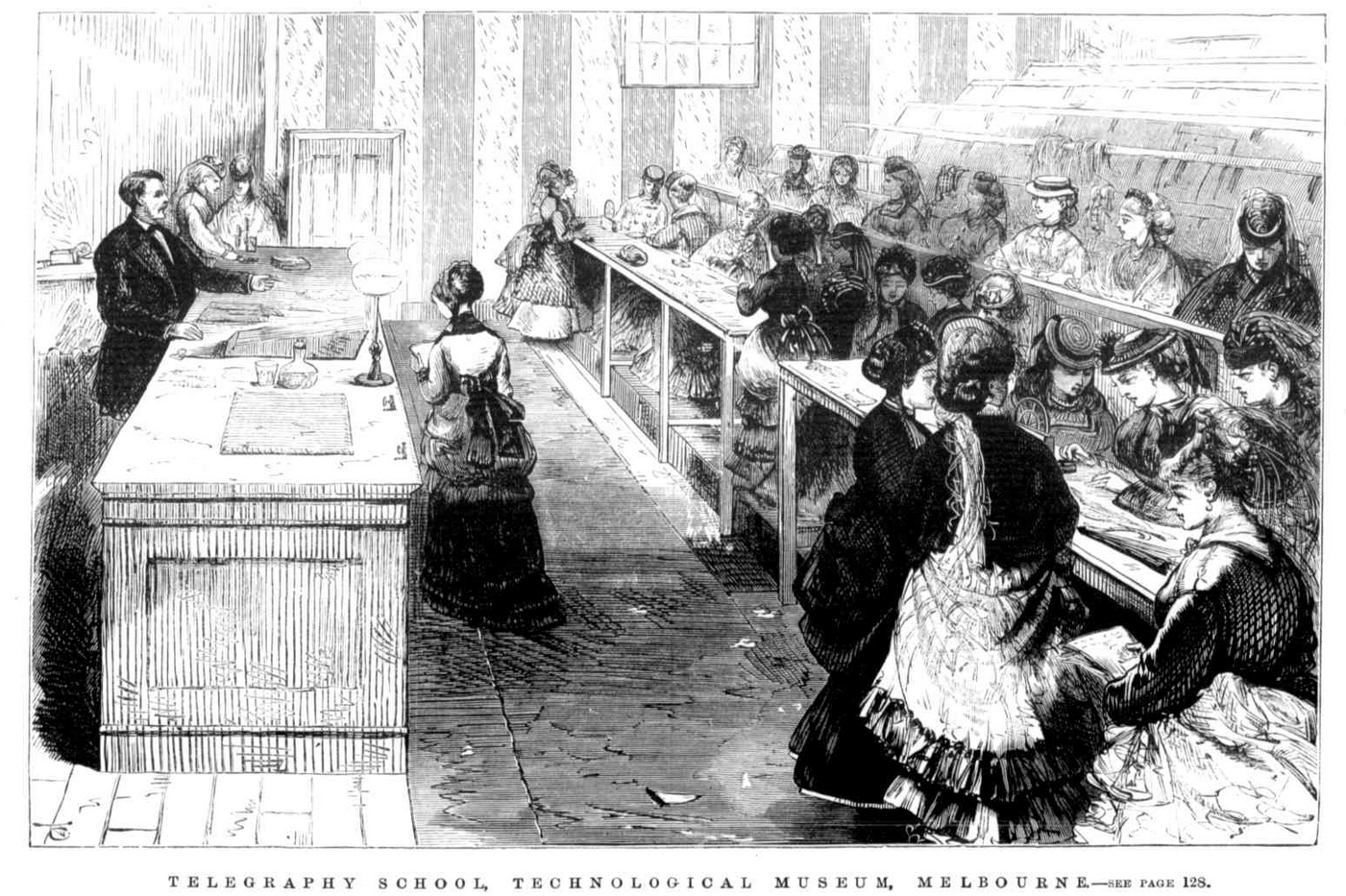
1872 Engraving by Samuel Calvert.

Australia's first telegraph line was commissioned in March 1854 between Melbourne and Williamstown and was constructed by Samuel Walker McGowan under contract to the Victorian Government. The telegraph lines were rapidly extended to cover the entire colony and the other colonies also established their own networks and interconnected the colonies. Australia became part of the world telegraph network in 1872 when a submarine cable was completed connecting Darwin, Australia with Britain via Java in the Dutch East Indies. An Overland Telegraph line was constructed to connect Darwin with other major cities in Australia.

==== Victoria ====
The Industrial and Technological Museum in Melbourne ran a telegraphy course in 1870–1880 that became so popular with women that a separate class for men was introduced. Initially the syllabus was limited to becoming proficient in operation of the morse key, but at the instigation of Samuel Walker McGowan, Superintendent of Telegraphs, the classes were expanded to include all aspects of the theory of electric telegraphy and maintenance of a typical telegraph station. Many of those that passed the examination were appointed to the Telegraph Department. During their three-month probationary period, they were supervised by Miss Green, said to be "one of the most skilful lady operators in the colony."

In 1874 the Ballarat School of Mines (now Federation University) included a telegraphy class in its curriculum. The first lecturer was William Philip Bechervaise and the classes were immediately successful and overwhelmingly female. There were 20 in the class including 18 females. The class was substantially oversubscribed, gave the school councillors cause to consider building extensions and boosted total school attendance by a third. A few years earlier the Victorian Post and Telegraph Department had decided to integrate its post offices and telegraph offices, particularly to enable continued expansion of the telegraph service into smaller centres. Many of these small post offices were already managed by unmarried females and it was important for them to acquire telegraphy skills to continue in their roles.

By 1880 the classes had become a victim of their own success and the Postmaster-General George Langridge announced that there was no prospect of further appointments for lady operators, with "several hundred" applicants registered. This was at a time of effective employment freeze since Langridge assumed office.

==== New South Wales ====
From 1875 the New South Wales Posts and Telegraphs Department also introduced women into its telegraphy operator workforce. NSW chose to train these staff by an experienced operator rather than external training.

=== South America ===
Around 1870, a school was established at the National Institute in Chile to teach telegraphy to women. This led to the employment of women as telegraphers in many locations in Chile. By 1900, women were also employed as telegraph operators in Argentina.

== Labor movement ==
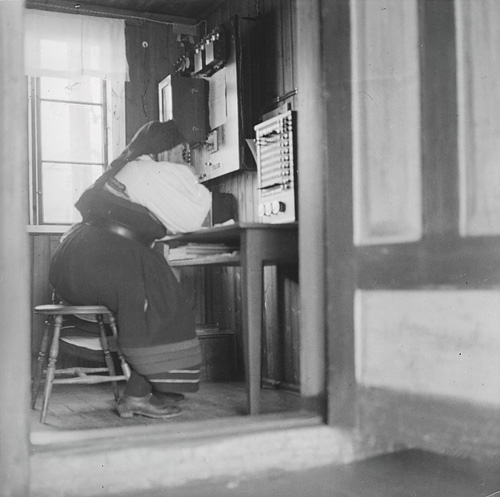
A telegraph operator in the 1940s.

Telegraphers in the U.S. began to form unions in the late nineteenth century as discontent grew over low wages and poor working conditions. Women telegraphers joined the Telegraphers' Protective League and participated in the unsuccessful strike against Western Union in 1870. The Brotherhood of Telegraphers was organized in 1881 as an affiliate union of the Knights of Labor; their platform included a demand for equal pay for equal work, regardless of gender. When the Brotherhood of Telegraphers called a general strike against the telegraph companies in 1883, many women operators joined and actively participated in the labor action, including Minnie Swan (1863 - ?), a New York telegrapher who emerged as the leader of the women strikers.

However, the strike again failed as the telegraph companies simply called in non-union strikebreakers to replace the striking operators. Women operators also joined the Order of Railroad Telegraphers, founded in 1886, and the Commercial Telegraphers Union of America, organized in 1903; women held leadership positions at various times in both unions. Mary Macaulay (1865–1944), a press operator who worked for many newspapers and wire services in New York, was elected International Vice President of the Commercial Telegraphers Union of America in 1919, the first woman to hold an elective office at the national level in a union.

Louisa Margaret Dunkley (1866–1927) was an Australian telegraphist who founded the Victorian Women's Post and Telegraph Association in Australia in the 1890s to advocate for equal pay and working conditions for women operators.

== Women's rights movement ==
Many women telegraph operators were strong supporters of women's rights, including suffrage and equal pay for equal work. Sarah Bagley became a telegraph operator in 1846 after forming the Lowell Female Labor Reform Association to support better working conditions for the women who worked in the textile mills of Lowell, Massachusetts. Mathilde Fibiger (1830–1872) was a Danish feminist, novelist, and telegraphist who championed women's rights in her novels. Mary Macaulay, a strong supporter of women's suffrage in the U.S., served as secretary to Susan B. Anthony while working as a telegrapher in Rochester, New York. Leah Rosenfeld was a railroad telegraph operator and station agent whose 1968 lawsuit against the Southern Pacific Railroad and the state of California helped to end job and wage discrimination against women and ensure equal opportunities for women in the U.S. railroad industry.

== Depiction in fiction ==
The increasing numbers of women in the telegraph industry in the late 19th century, and growing public interest in their role, led to the development of a literary genre known as the "telegraphic romance". These novels and short stories tell the story of a young woman who finds romance in her work as a telegrapher, often with another operator whom she meets "over the wire". One of the most popular of the telegraphic romances was the novel Wired Love, written by former telegraph operator Ella Cheever Thayer and published in 1879. It is the story of telegrapher Nattie Rogers and her romance with the mysterious "C", whom she befriends over the wire. In the Cage, an 1898 novella by Henry James, has as its central character a nameless London telegraphist; James uses her interactions with her customers in the Mayfair district to weave a plot around issues of class and society in late Victorian Britain.

The female telegraph operator, fending off desperados while tending to her duties at lonely railroad stations, became a stock character in many of the melodramas produced in the early years of the cinema. The Lonedale Operator (1911), starring Blanche Sweet, and The Girl and Her Trust (1912), starring Dorothy Bernard, were filmed by the director D. W. Griffith for Biograph Studios. The Hazards of Helen serials, filmed between 1914 and 1917 by the Kalem Company, featured first Helen Holmes and later Helen Gibson as adventurous telegraph operators who performed daring stunts on a weekly basis to save the day for the railroad company.

== Decline of industry ==
The introduction of the Teletype or Telex and the automatic printer, beginning around 1915, and the development of the Telex network in the 1920s, greatly increased the speed and efficiency of message transmission, as well as changing the work of the telegraph operator. Instead of using a telegraph key to transmit messages in Morse code, the Teletype operator simply typed messages on a standard typewriter keyboard. At the receiving end, an automatic printer printed out the text on paper sheets or tape. Introduction of the Teletype greatly increased the number of women employed as telegraphers; however, the predominantly female Teletype operators were generally paid less than the mainly male Morse operators.

The number of messages sent by telegraph began to decline in the mid-twentieth century, due to competition with the telephone and the internet. Although still used by radio amateurs and hobbyists, the last use of Morse code for signalling came to an end on January 31, 1999, when it was no longer required for international distress signalling by ships at sea. Western Union discontinued its telegraph service in 2006.

== See also ==
- Electrical telegraphy in the United Kingdom
- Young Ladies Radio League, an organisation for women in amateur radio
