= Telegraphist =

Operator who uses a telegraph key to send and receive the Morse code

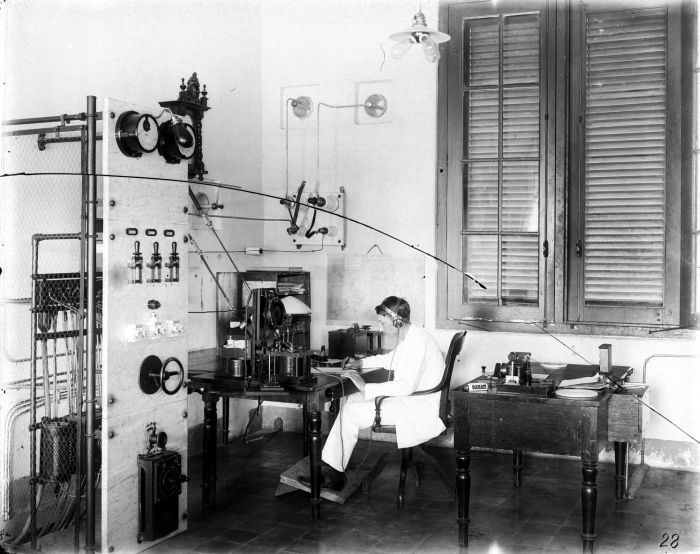
Telegrapher, dated before 1927 from the Tropenmuseum collection

A telegraphist (British English), telegrapher (American English), or telegraph operator is a person who uses a telegraph key to send and receive Morse code messages in a telegraphy system. These messages, also called telegrams, can be transmitted electronically by land lines, or wirelessly by radio.

== History ==
After electric telegraphy became available, companies or public entities offered telegram services - delivering telegraphed messages directly to the recipient. Earlier optical systems were largely limited to official government and military purposes. Historically, telegrams were sent between a network of interconnected telegraph offices which were staffed by telegraphists.

During the telegraph era there was widespread employment of women in telegraphy. The shortage of men to work as telegraph operators in the American Civil War opened up the opportunity for women of a well-paid skilled job. In the UK, there was widespread employment of women as telegraph operators even earlier – from the 1850s by all the major companies. The attraction of women for the telegraph companies was that they could pay them less than men. Nevertheless, the jobs were popular with women for the same reason as in the US; most other work available for women was very poorly paid.

With the invention of wireless telegraphy, telegraphists known as wireless operators or radio operators, began working aboard ships. Companies such as the Marconi Company and Telefunken provided specially trained operators to work aboard ships to transmit passenger messages and, more importantly, navigation information between ships and land stations.

== Notable telegraphists ==
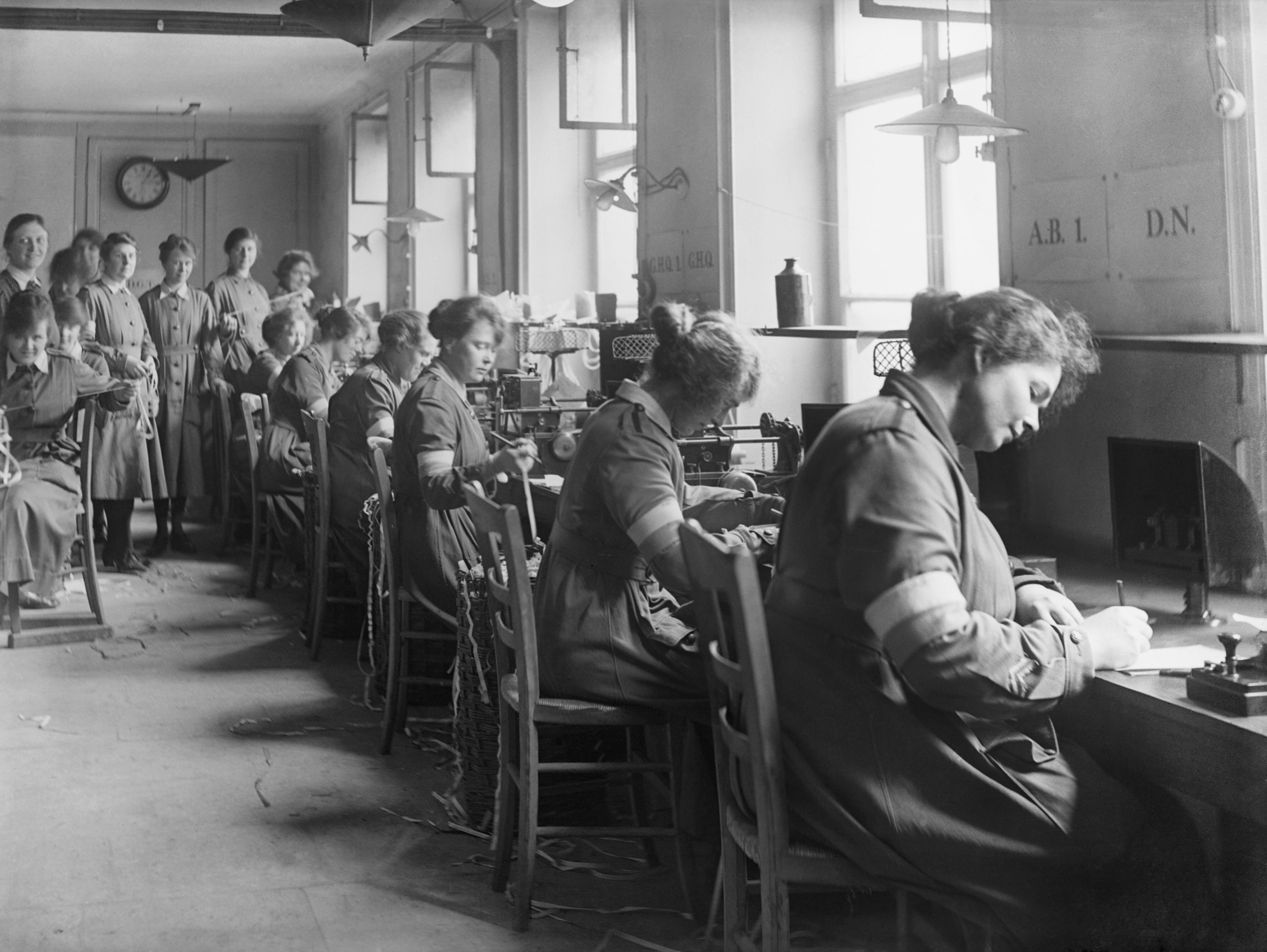
Telgraphists of the Queen Mary's Army Auxiliary Corps, 1919

- Louisa Margaret Dunkley
- Thomas Eckert
- Thomas Edison
- John H. Emerick
- Mathilde Fibiger
- Ambrose E. Gonzales
- Oliver Heaviside
- Emma Hunter
- Joseph Nathan Kane
- Juscelino Kubitschek
- Hiram Percy Maxim
- Mary Macaulay
- Seeb Chunder Nandy
- Franklin Leonard Pope
- John Willard Raught
- Leah Rosenfeld
- Ola Delight Smith
- Wilhelmina Magdalene Stuart
- Ella Cheever Thayer
- Ella Stewart Udall
- Alfred Vail

== See also ==
- Amateur radio
- Radio operator
- Casa del Telegrafista (House of the Telegrapher), a museum in Colombia
- Commercial Cable Company
- List of obsolete occupations
- Transatlantic telegraph cable
