= Aracataca =

Coordinates: 10°35′37.30″N 74°11′34.11″W

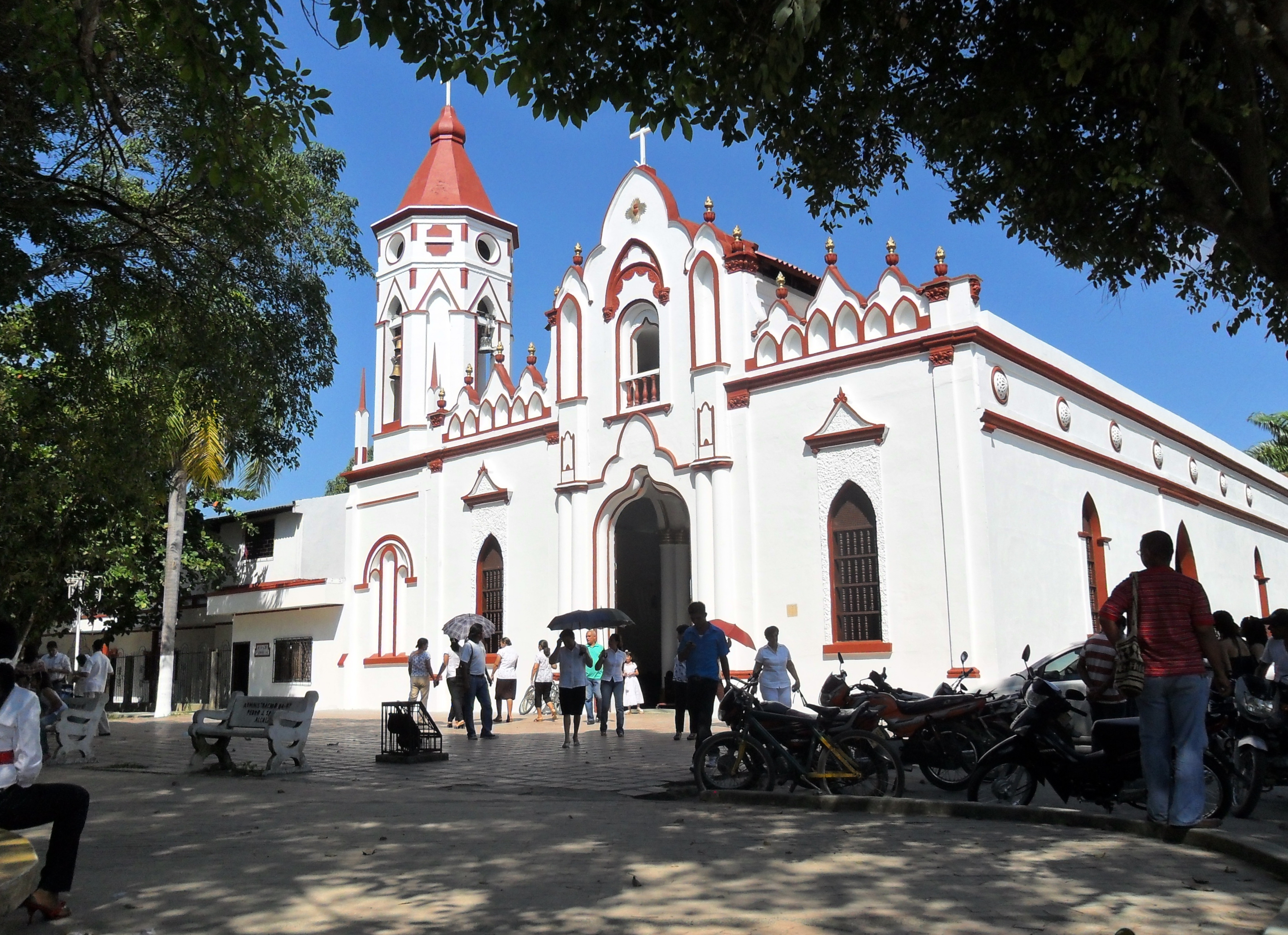
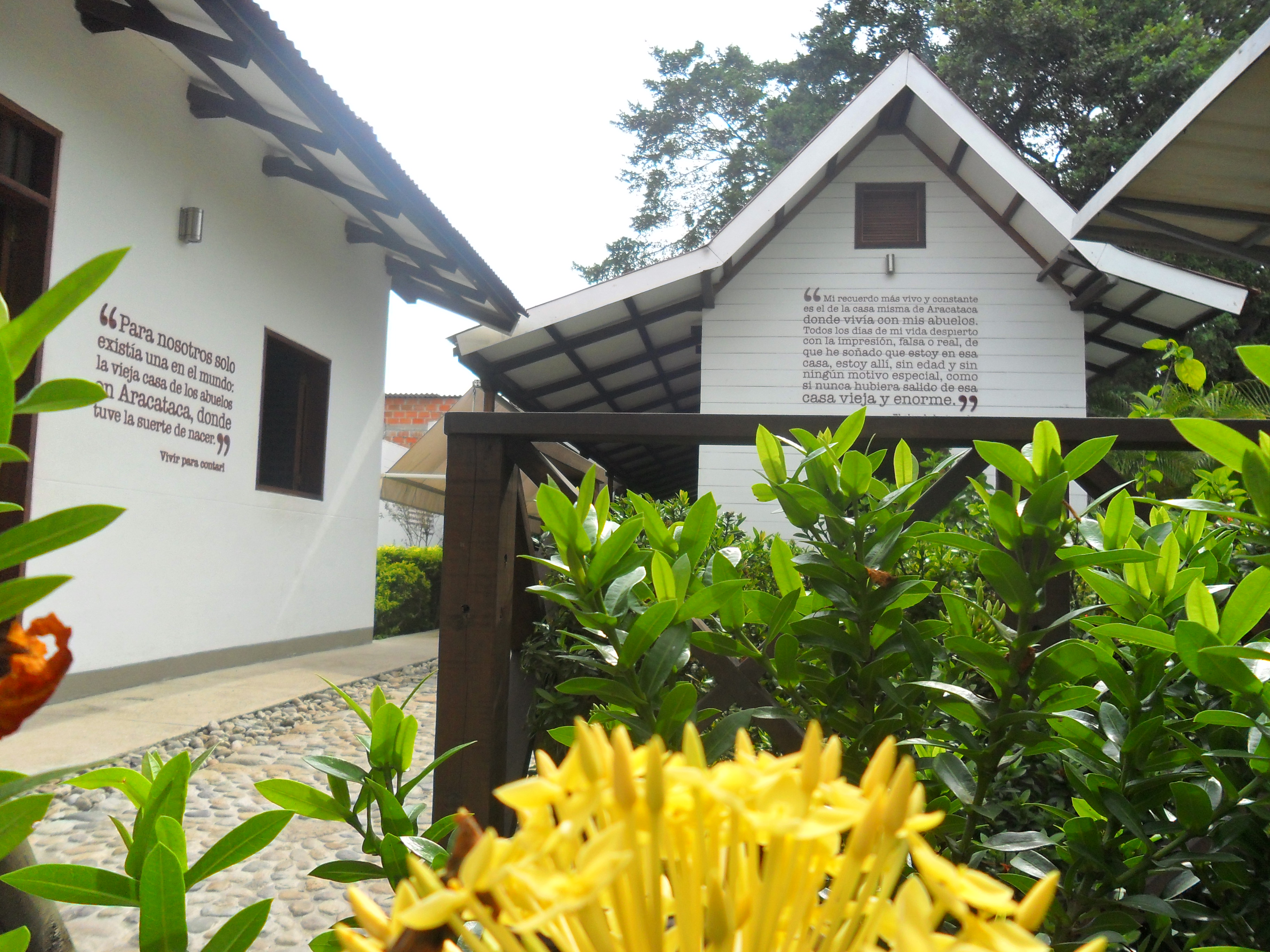
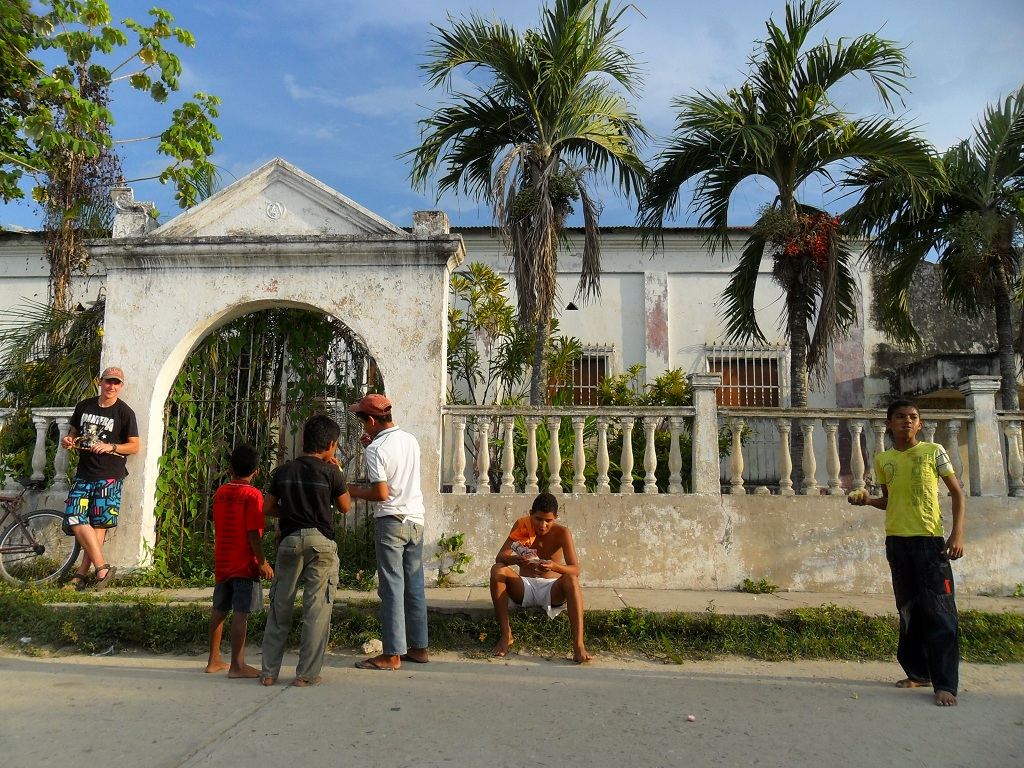
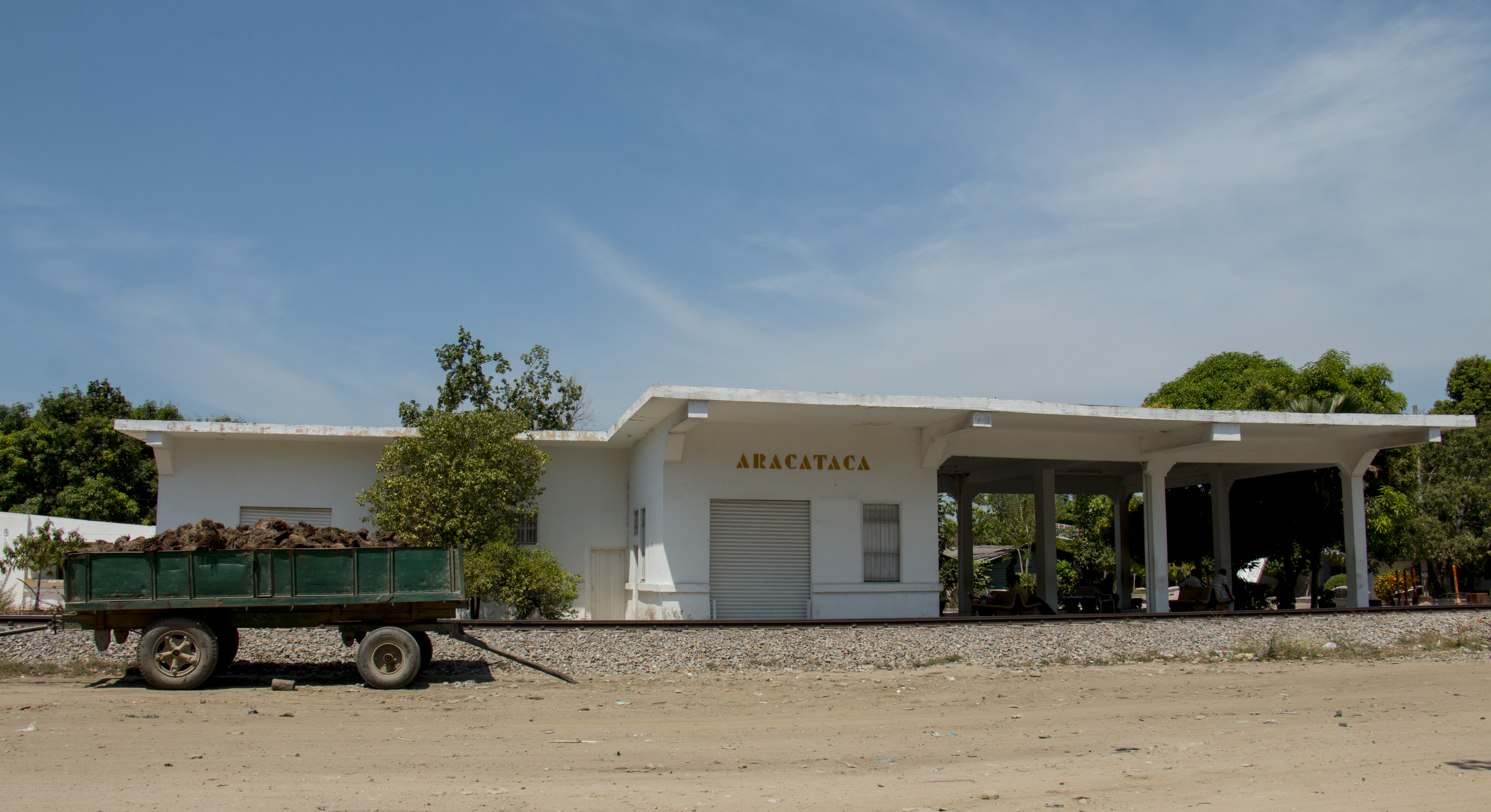
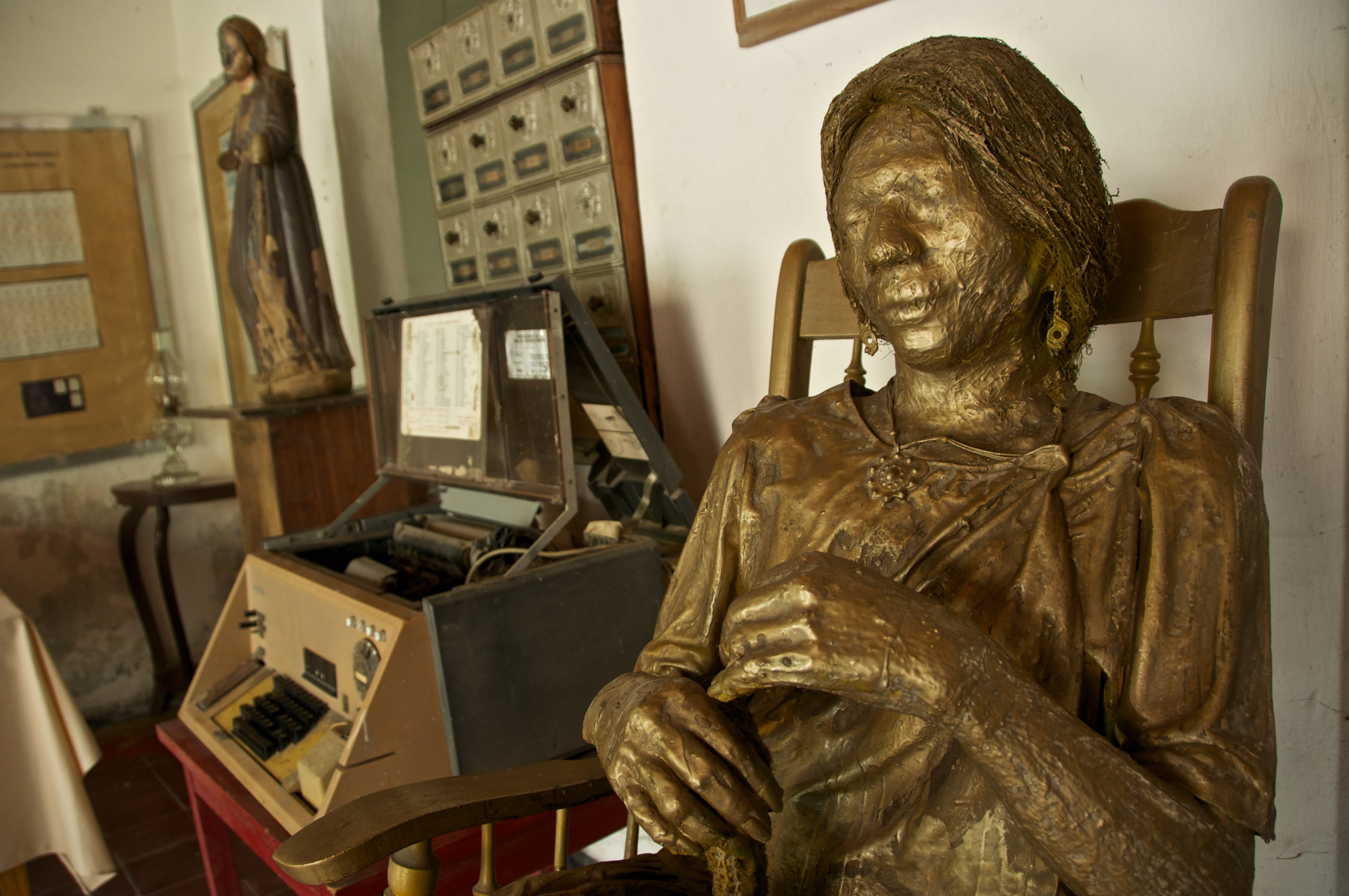

- Flag
- Nickname: Cataca
- Location of the town and municipality of Aracataca in the Department of Magdalena.
- Country: Colombia
- Region: Caribbean
- Department: Magdalena
- Foundation: 1885

Area
  - Total: 1,755 km^{2} (678 sq mi)

Population (2020 est.)
  - Total: 41,872
- Time zone: UTC-5
- Climate: Aw
- Website: www.aracataca-magdalena.gov.co

Aracataca (colloquially sometimes referred to as "Cataca") is a town and municipality located in the Department of Magdalena, in Colombia's Caribbean Region. Aracataca is a river town founded in 1885. The town stands beside a small river of the same name, the Aracataca river, that flows from the nearby Sierra Nevada de Santa Marta mountain range into the Ciénaga Grande de Santa Marta, a lagoon of the Caribbean Sea. Aracataca is 80 kilometres (50 mi) south of the Department capital Santa Marta. The town is best known as the birthplace of Nobel literature laureate Gabriel García Márquez.

== Geography and climate ==
The municipality borders to the north with the municipalities of Zona Bananera, Santa Marta and Cienaga, to the east with the Cesar Department, to the south with the municipality of Fundación, and to the west with the municipalities of El Retén and Pueblo Viejo.

Aracataca's climate is tropical: warm and humid year-round.

== History ==
Aracataca was founded in 1885. It achieved the status of municipality on 28 April 1915, when it separated from the municipality of Pueblo Viejo. In the late 19th century, companies that would later merge into the United Fruit Company colonized the land and started to cultivate bananas in the wide region. After some decades, the downfall of the company initiated and completed soon after, partly because of the worldwide recession and the war soon after.

Aracataca is the inspiration for the fictional town of Macondo in Gabriel García Márquez's novel One Hundred Years of Solitude. On June 25, 2006, a referendum to rename the town "Aracataca-Macondo" failed due to a low turnout.

== Economy ==
Aracataca relies heavily on agriculture, mainly producing oil palm, rice, cotton, sugar cane, common bean, plantain, bananas, yuca, tomato and on livestock raising like cattle, equines, mules, donkeys, domesticated birds, goats, and pigs. Commerce represents another form of income and is mostly done informally, especially along the main highway to Santa Marta where large lines of stands selling beach towels are placed.

== Transportation ==
There are several companies that offer inter-municipal and inter-departmental transportation on medium-size buses, minivans and taxi cabs. Most tourists and locals use Berlinas del Fonce which has busses leaving the Santa Marta terminal every 30 minutes between 5am and 6pm. $9.000 p.p. From the transportation office in Aracataca you can get almost everywhere using a ciclotaxi for just $1.000 p.p. The rivers are not navigable and there are a few small rudimentary airfields used by small aircraft for agricultural fumigation. The municipality and town are crossed by the Highway 45 that extends from Santa Marta, crosses Aracataca, Fundación, El Copey, Bosconia, Curumani into the Cesar Department and turns south towards the Colombian Andean Region. The railway no longer works for public transportation, it is used almost exclusively to transport coal from the region of La Loma Calentura in the Cesar Department to the Port of Santa Marta.

== Notable people ==
=== Gabriel Garcia Márquez ===
Gabriel José de la Concordia García Márquez, affectionately known as Gabo or Gabito throughout Latin America, was a Colombian novelist, short-story writer, screenwriter, and journalist. Born on March 6, 1927, in Aracataca, Colombia, he is considered one of the most significant authors of the 20th century, particularly in the Spanish language. García Márquez received the 1972 Neustadt International Prize for Literature and the 1982 Nobel Prize in Literature. His acclaimed works include “One Hundred Years of Solitude” (1967), which sold over fifty million copies, “Chronicle of a Death Foretold” (1981), and “Love in the Time of Cholera” (1985). He popularized the literary style known as magic realism, blending magical elements with otherwise ordinary situations. García Márquez’s legacy endures as the most-translated Spanish-language author. Upon his death in April 2014, he was hailed by the president of Colombia as “the greatest Colombian who ever lived".

=== Leo Matiz ===
Leo Matiz (1917–1998) was a Colombian photographer, caricaturist, newspaper publisher, painter, and gallery owner. Born in the small village of Aracataca, Colombia, he shared his hometown with the author Gabriel García Márquez. Matiz traveled extensively, selling caricatures and illustrations to support himself. His gallery hosted the first exhibition of Colombian artist Fernando Botero in 1951. Known for his distinctive style, including long hair, colored jackets, and a gangster-style mustache, Matiz photographed notable figures such as Frida Kahlo, Diego Rivera, and Louis Armstrong. His work appeared in publications like Life, Reader’s Digest, and Harper Magazine. Despite losing an eye due to a robbery, Matiz continued photographing with an eye patch until his death in Bogotá in 1998. The Foundation Leo Matiz was established to preserve his legacy

== Culture ==
=== Festivities ===
Aracatacans celebrate the Roman Catholic tradition of Three Kings on January 6 of every year, Carnivals and the Holy Week between February and March, a cultural week, The Festival of the Unedited Song (Festival de la Canción Inédita), the municipality's anniversary in April, and the River Festival (Festival del Río). The Fiestas Patronales which consist of large outdoor concerts and semi bullfights this year is being held from 15 July till the 24th.

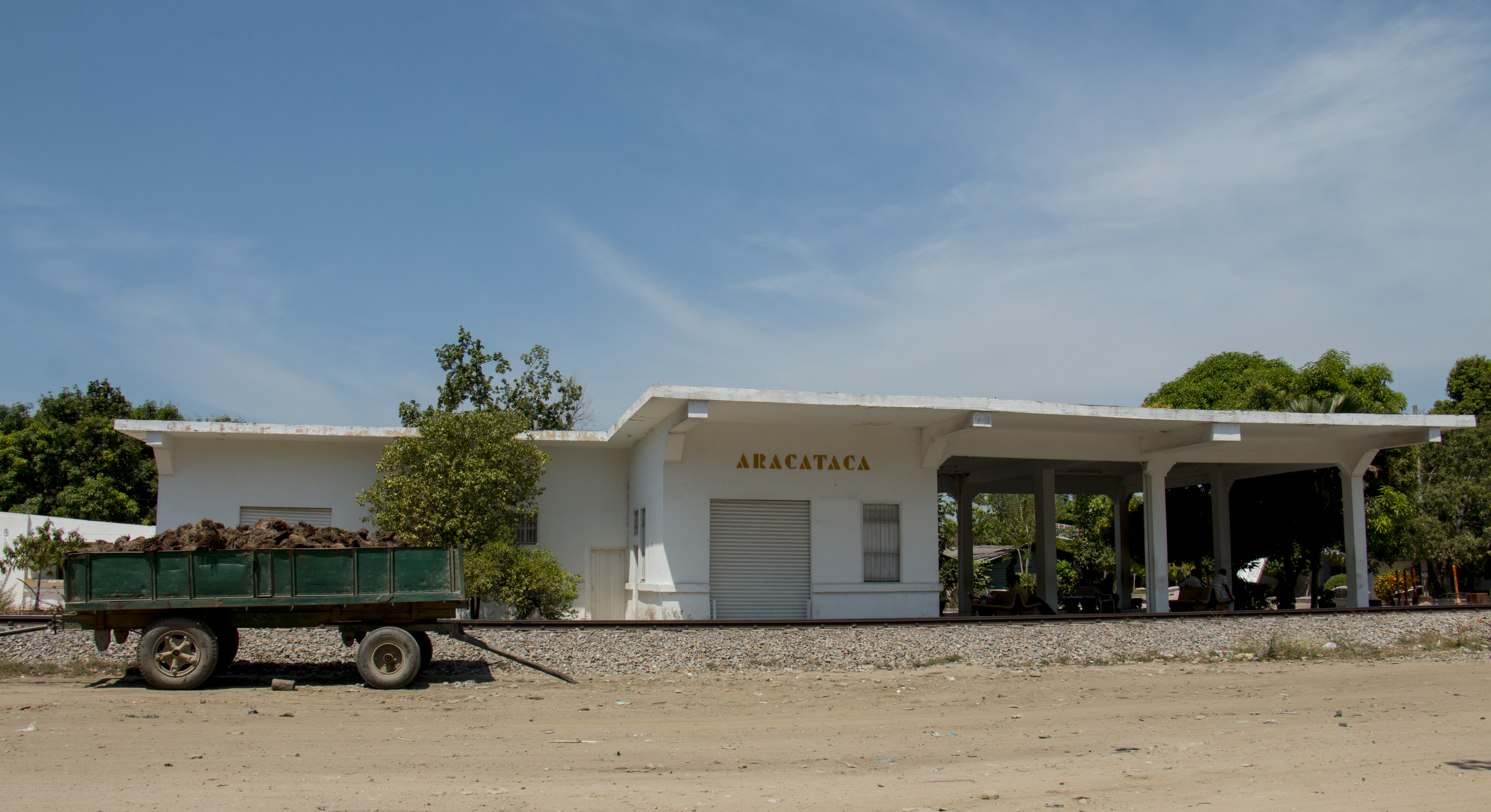
Aracataca train station, one of the literary settings of Gabriel Garcia Márquez's novel.

== Tourism ==
Tourism in Aracataca is growing, but still at a low level. The most famous attraction is the house in which Gabriel García Márquez grew up, now the Casa Museo (Museum House). Another museum, Casa del Telegrafista, is also popular. In addition, the recently renovated train station will serve as an exhibition hall for photographs by Leo Matiz, a native of Aracataca.

== Places of interest ==
1. Aracataca Train Station: Aracataca Train Station is associated with Gabriel García Márquez, who featured it in his novels and visited it during his childhood. The station is visited by literature enthusiasts as a connection to the setting of his work. It holds literary significance and preserves the memory of the author from Colombia.

2. Plaza de Bolivar: This central square features a statue of Simón Bolívar, the prominent leader in the South American independence movement, as is common in many towns and cities throughout Colombia and other Latin American countries. The park hosts a coffee shop, a playground, and is surrounded by the central church, billiards' establishments and stores.

3. García Márquez House Museum: The García Márquez House Museum, located in Aracataca, Colombia, is a significant cultural landmark dedicated to honoring the life and work of Gabriel García Márquez, one of Latin America's most celebrated authors. The museum is housed in the author's childhood home, where he spent his early years and was deeply influenced by the stories, people, and landscapes of the region. Visitors to the museum can explore the rooms of the house, which have been preserved to reflect the period when García Márquez lived there. Exhibits include personal belongings, photographs, manuscripts, and other memorabilia associated with the author's life and literary career. The museum offers insight into García Márquez's upbringing and the real-life experiences that inspired his iconic novels, including "One Hundred Years of Solitude.

4. Casa del Telegrafista: The Casa del Telegrafista, or Telegraph Operator's House, is a historic site located in Aracataca, Colombia. This house holds significance as it is where Gabriel García Márquez, the Nobel Prize-winning author, spent part of his childhood. García Márquez often referenced this house in his works, including his masterpiece "One Hundred Years of Solitude," where it served as inspiration for the Buendía family home. Today, the Casa del Telegrafista has been restored and transformed into a museum dedicated to García Márquez and his literary legacy. Visitors can explore the house and learn about the author's early life, his connections to Aracataca, and the influences that shaped his writing. The museum provides a glimpse into García Márquez's upbringing and the magical realism that permeates his novels, making it a must-visit destination for fans of his work and literature enthusiasts alike.

5. Melquiades Tombstone: In Gabriel García Márquez's "One Hundred Years of Solitude," Melquiades is a mysterious and enigmatic character who plays a pivotal role in the story. Melquiades is depicted as a wandering gypsy and a bringer of knowledge and mysticism to the town of Macondo. His presence is felt throughout the narrative, even after his death, as his writings and inventions continue to influence the characters and events in the story.

Because Melquiades was the first person to die in Macondo, to increase the sense of belonging for the local townspeople related to the legacy of Garcia Márquez, it was decided to erect a tombstone to this 'greatest benefactor of Macondo'.

== Politics ==
=== Administrative divisions ===
==== Urban ====
===== Neighborhoods =====
The town of Aracataca has 33 Barrios: La Esperanza, La esmeralda, Zacapita, 2 de febrero, 20 de Julio, Ayacucho, Nariño, Loma Fresca, 7 de Agosto, El Carmen, Cataquita, Macondo, El Suiche, El Pradito, 11 de Noviembre, 7 de Abril, Ciudadela macondo, San José, Base, Marujita, Las delicias, Centro, Boston, El Porvenir, 1 de Mayo, Galán, San Martín, Bello Horizonte, Raíces, Macondo, Villa del Río I y II.

===== Populated centers =====
- Buenos Aires, Cauca, Sampues, La Fuente

==== Rural ====
===== Veredas =====
Aracataca contains 13 veredas:

- Tehobromina, El Torito, Macaraquilla, La escondida, Bocatoma, La Ribiera, La Fuente, Cerro Azul, El Volante, El porvenir, Marimonda

Aracataca has 3 caseríos:

- Serankua, Yechikin, Dwanawimaku

== Gallery ==
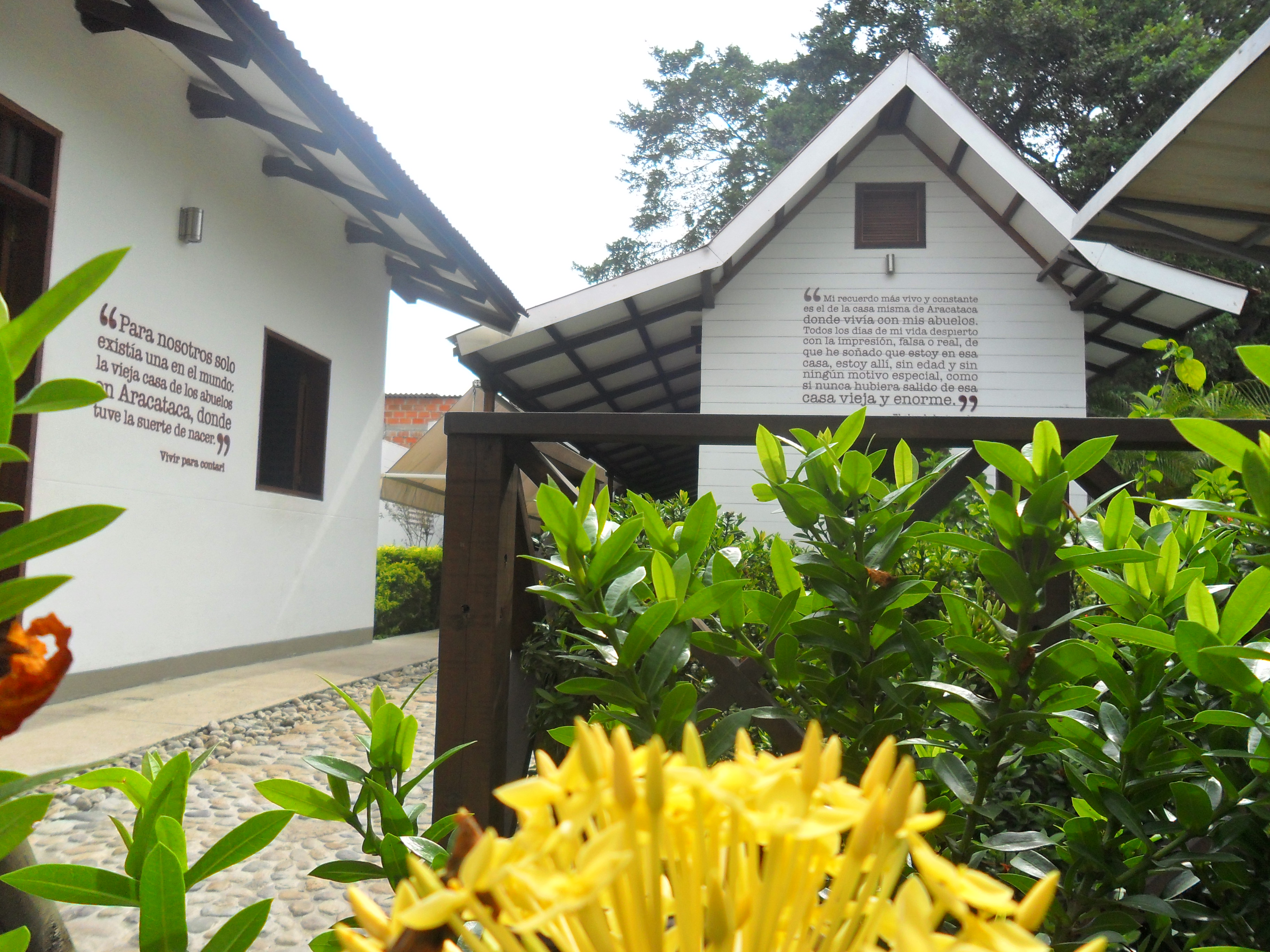
Gabriel García Márquez's Birthplace Museum

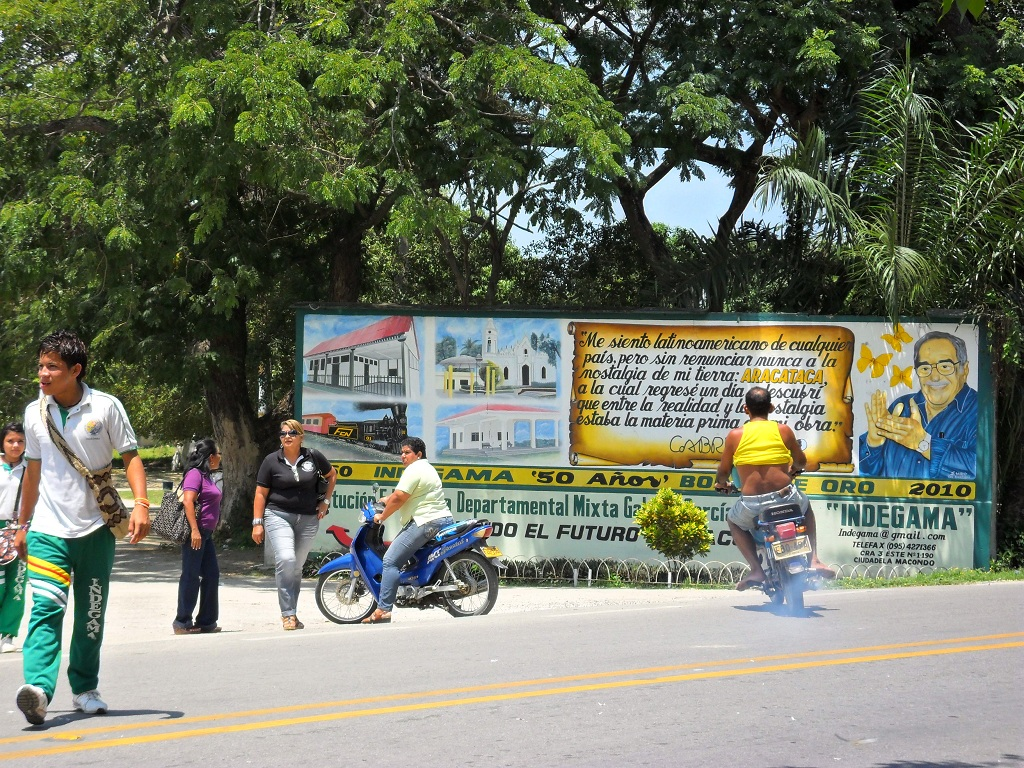
García Márquez Wall

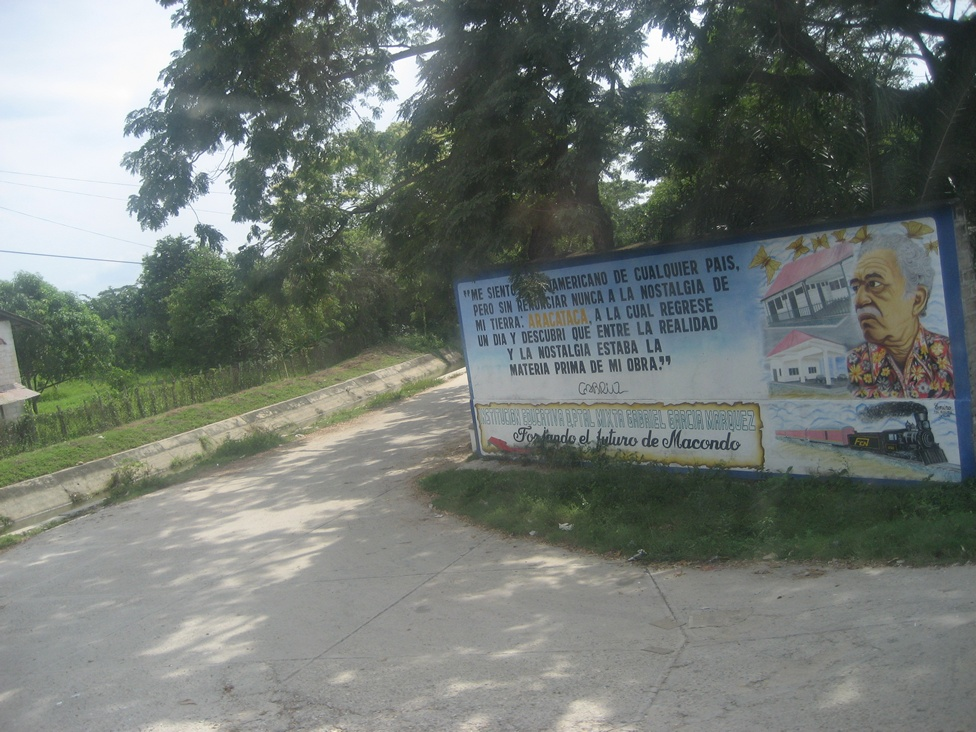
Billboard of Gabriel García Márquez in Aracataca. The billboard reads: "I feel I am an American from every country, without never renouncing to the nostalgia for my land, to which I returned one day and discovered that between the reality and nostalgia was the Feedstock for my work". - Gabriel García Márquez

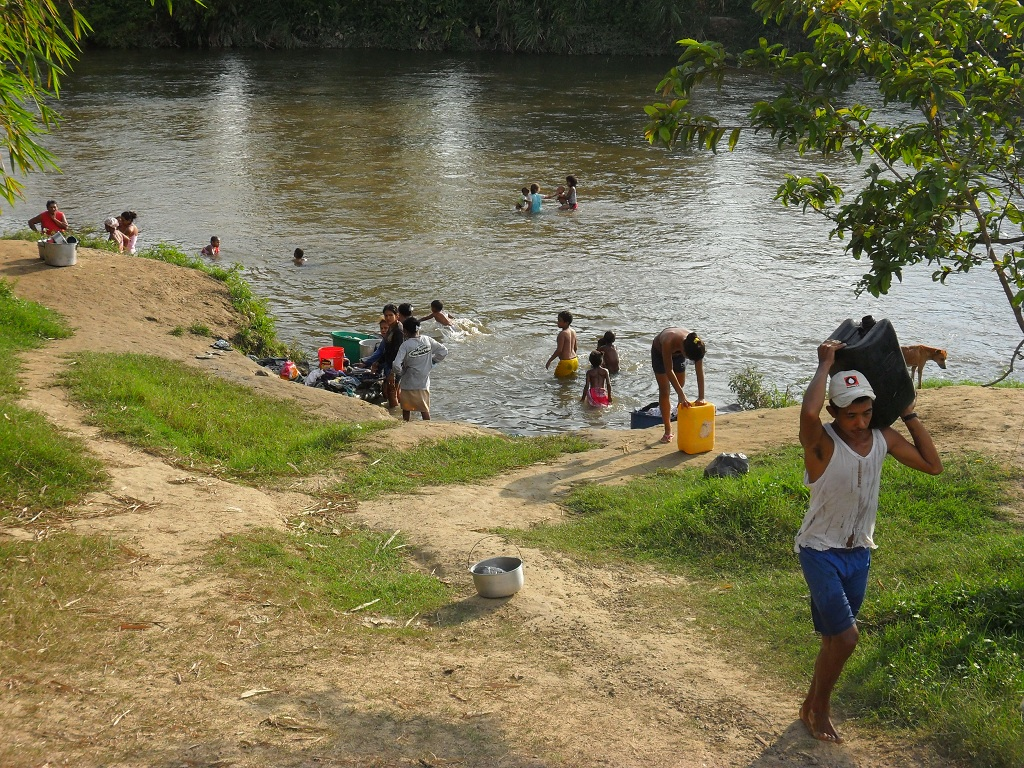
Riverlife

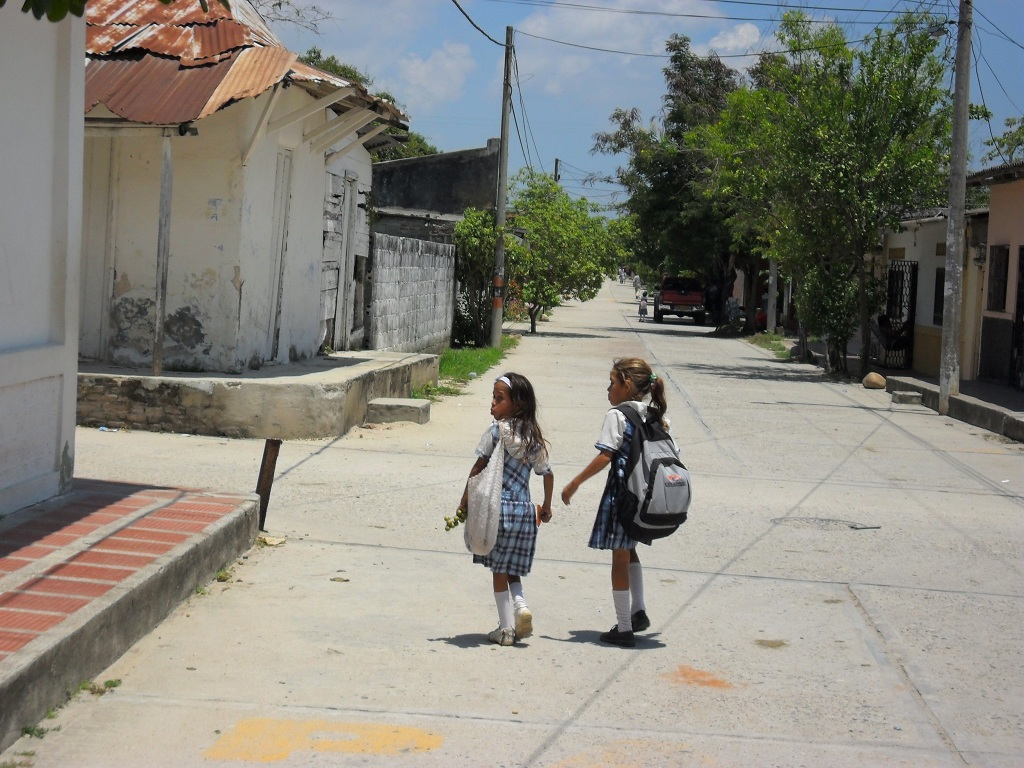
Schoolkids

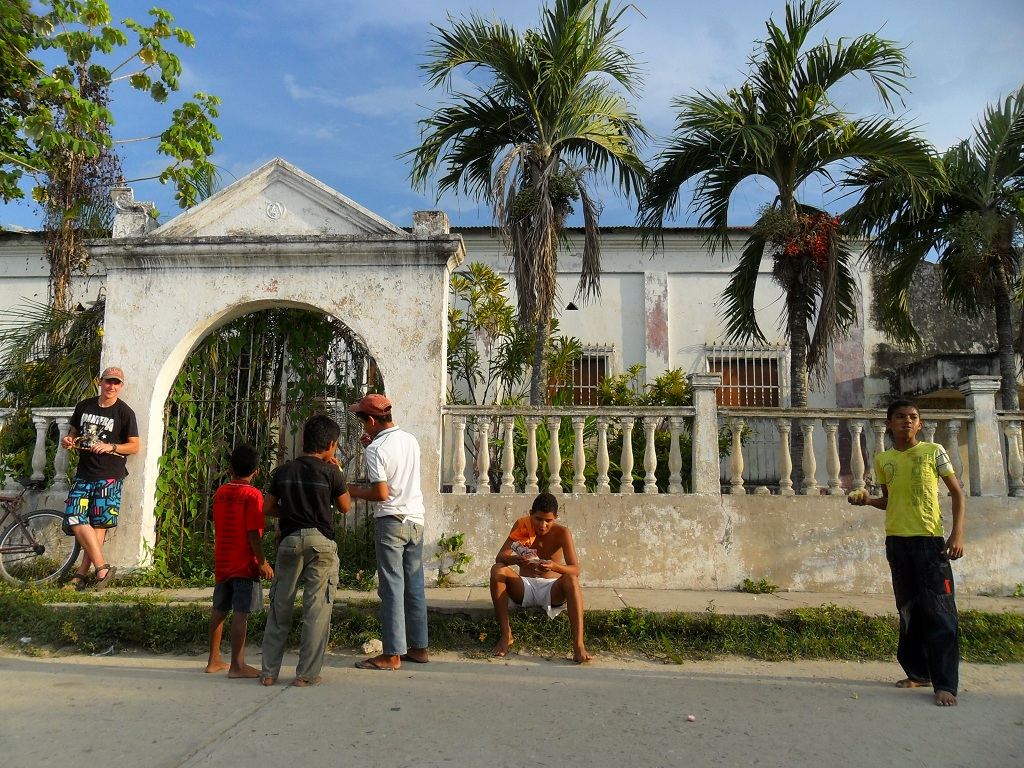
Freemason lodge

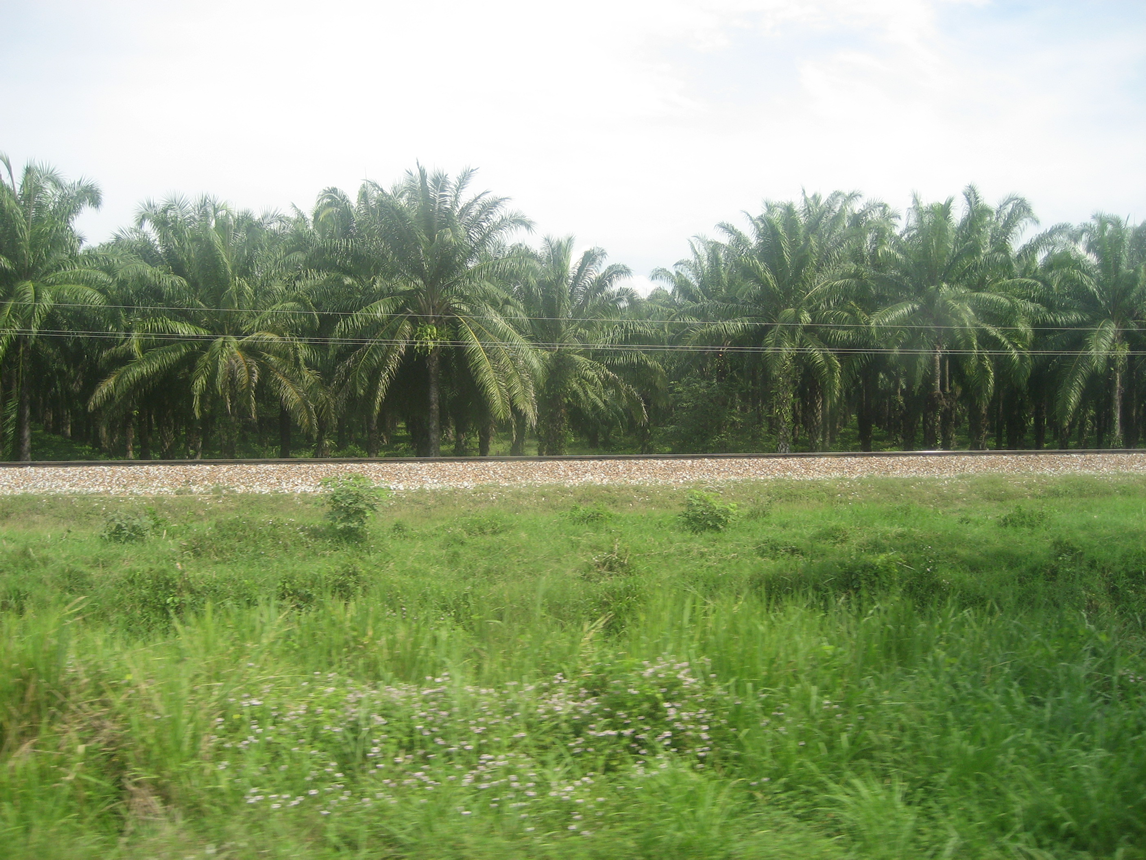
Oil palm plantations in the municipality of Aracataca

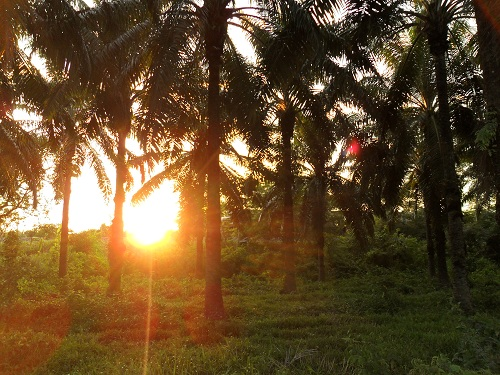
African palmtree forest, from which palm oil is being won

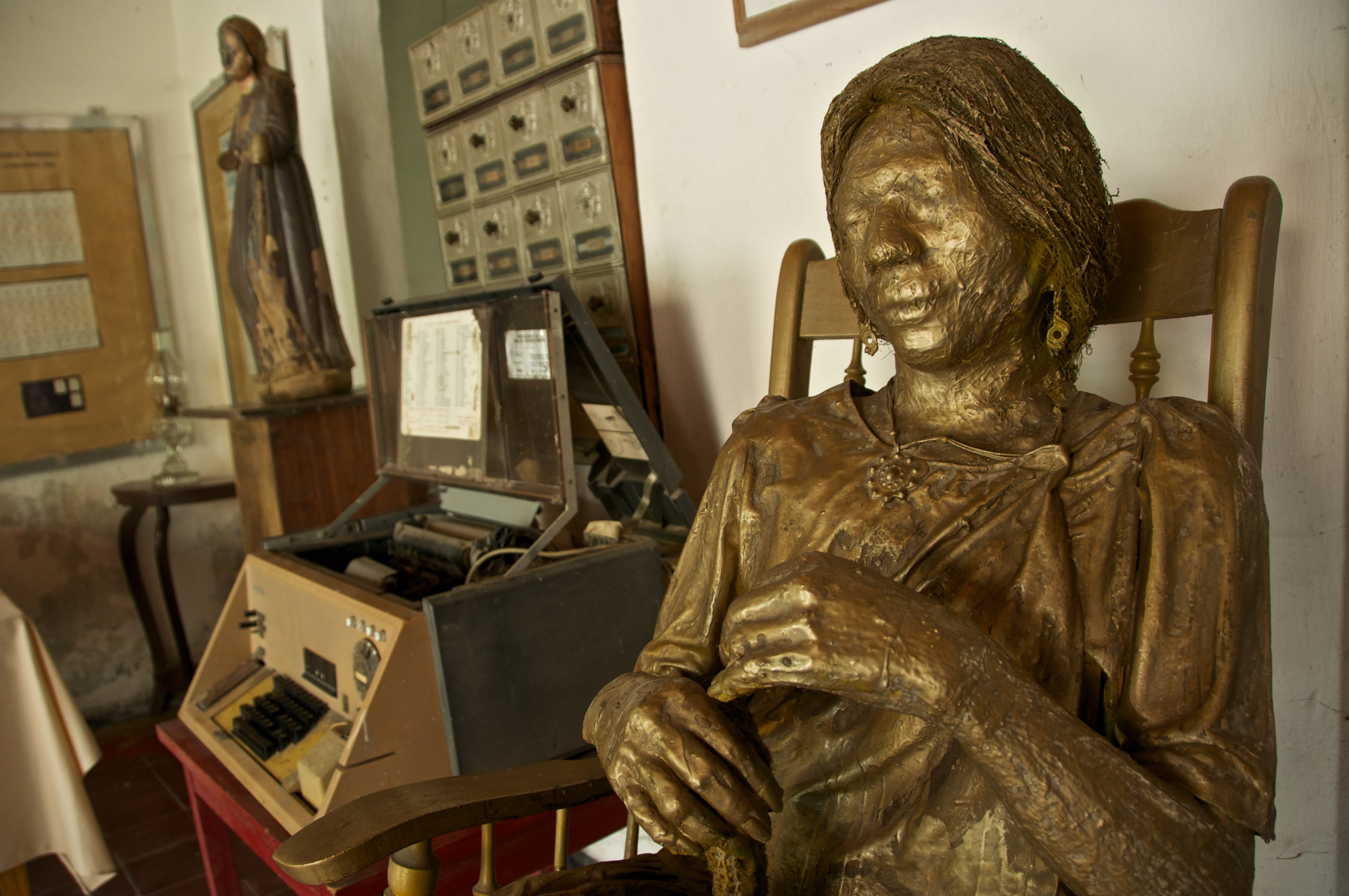
The house of the Telegrafist

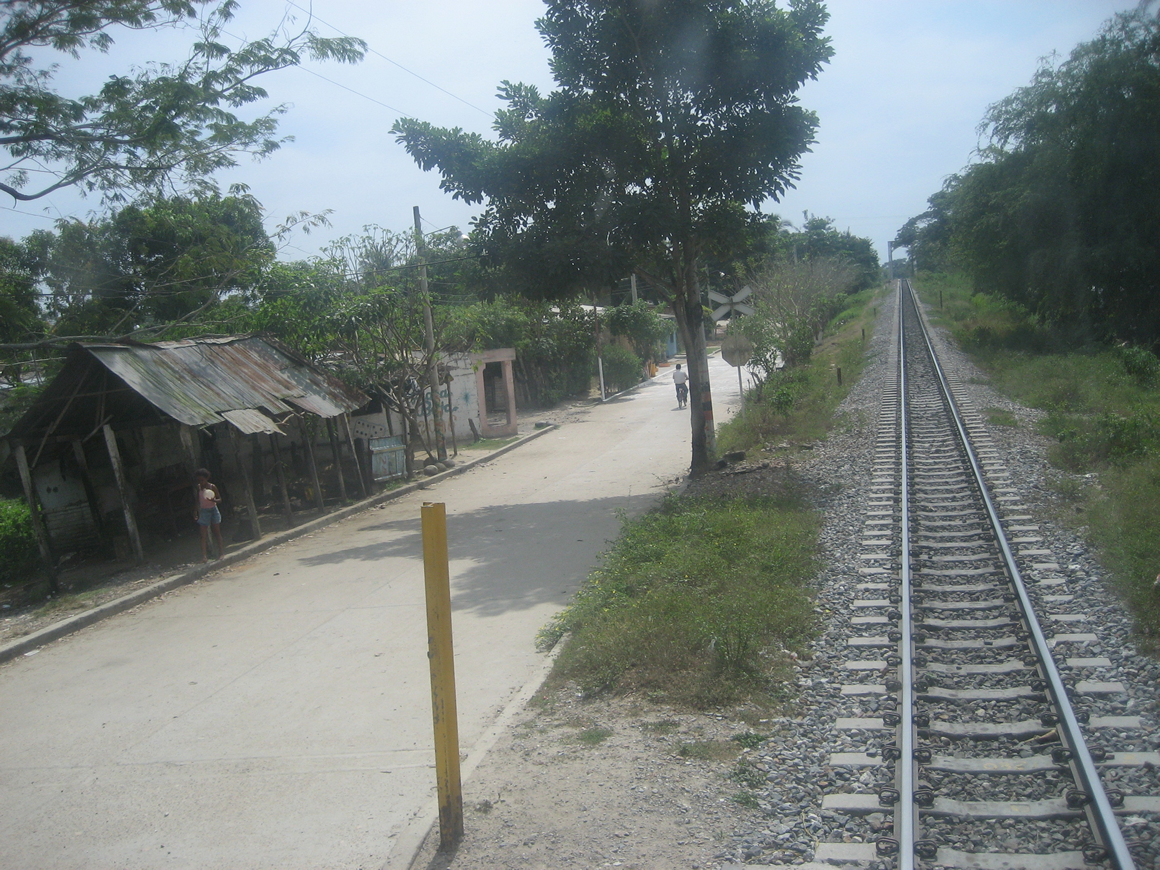
Aracataca railway

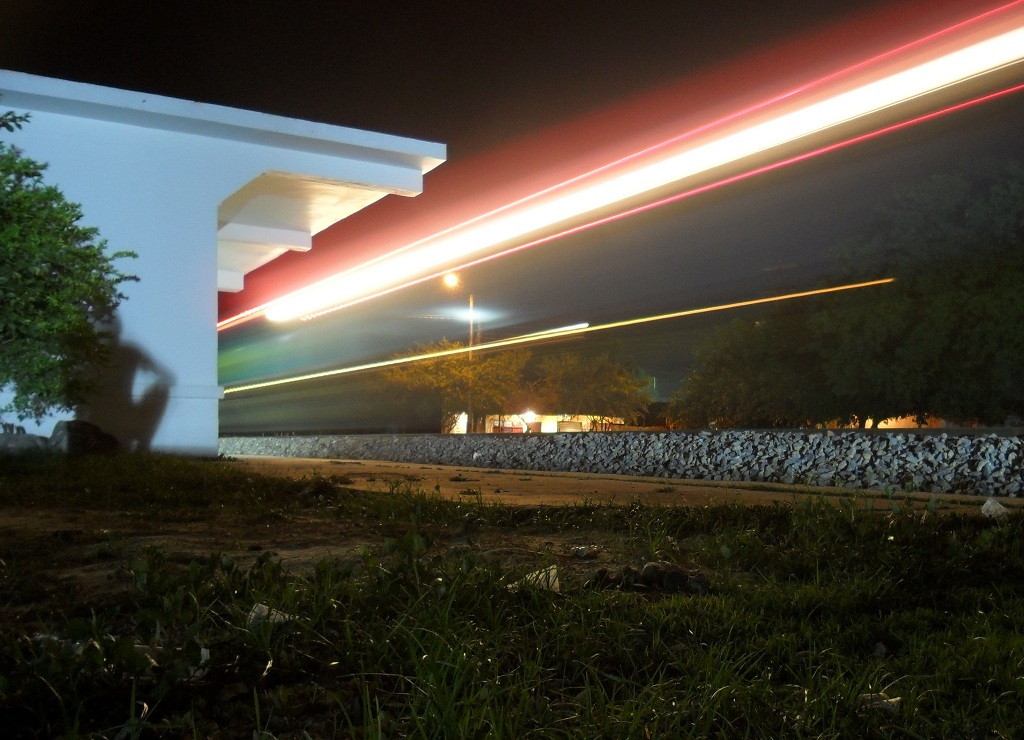
Train passing by the station
