= Emma Hunter =

Emma Hunter may refer to:

- Emma Hunter (swimmer)
- Emma Hunter (actress)
- Emma Hunter (telegrapher)
