= Leah Rosenfeld =

American labor union official

Leah Rosenfeld, Hiland, California, 1973

Leah Rosenfeld (October 25, 1908 – November 12, 2006) was a railroad telegraph operator and station agent whose 1968 lawsuit against the Southern Pacific Railroad and the state of California helped to end job and wage discrimination against women and ensure equal opportunities for women in the railroad industry.

== Early life and beginning of railroad career ==
At age 16 in 1924, Rosenfeld had worked as a clerk and paralegal in a law firm. In October 1944, then 36 years old, she began her career as a railroad telegrapher and station agent with the Southern Pacific Railroad after completing courses in telegraphy and clerical work. The railroads began to hire increasing numbers of women during World War II to replace the men drafted into military service; Rosenfeld took the job to help support her growing family, then consisting of nine children.

== Employment as railroad operator – 1944–1955 ==
After her divorce in 1953, she became the sole support of 6 of her 12 children and worked in a number of one-operator stations, mostly in desert areas around the Salton Sea from Mecca, California, to Yuma, Arizona. For a time, the family lived in a refrigerator car that Southern Pacific converted into housing with added screen porches. In 1955, a position opened in Saugus, California, for an agent/telegrapher. With ten years' seniority, Rosenfeld applied for the position. The Southern Pacific Railroad denied her promotion from operator to station agent, citing the state of California's "women's protective laws" which barred women from lifting more than 25 pounds or working more than eight hours per day, both of which were required of station agents. However, railroad workers were covered by the federal Railroad Labor Act, which did not distinguish between male and female workers.

Rosenfeld then protested to her union, the Order of Railroad Telegraphers, noting that she had already performed the duties of a station agent in her previous employment, but earning a lower wage. However, the union did not support her claim.

== Suit against the State of California – 1968 ==
The railroad continued to reject her claims for promotion, citing the California state law that barred women from performing the duties of station agents. However, in 1964, the passage of the federal Civil Rights Act of 1964 and its Title VII made it illegal for employers to discriminate against women in hiring practices, and created the Equal Employment Opportunity Commission (EEOC) to redress employment grievances. When the Southern Pacific Railroad gave the position of agent/telegrapher at Thermal, California, to a man with less seniority in March 1966, she took her case to the Equal Employment Opportunity Commission, which advised her to file suit against the State of California. On August 30, 1968, she filed suit against the State of California, the Southern Pacific Railroad, and her union, then known as the Transportation Communications International Union. On November 25, 1968, the suit against the Southern Pacific Railroad was settled and the California women's protective laws were declared unconstitutional. A subsequent appeal filed by the railroad in 1971 was also decided in Rosenfeld's favor.

The outcome of the suit was a victory for Rosenfeld, who received her promotion and pay increase, and benefited all women railroad workers. As a result, the railroad industry began hiring women in all positions in 1971 at the same pay rate as men.

== Later life and retirement ==
Rosenfeld was able to receive her promotion and pay adjustment shortly before she retired from the Southern Pacific in 1974. She spent the rest of her life in Mariposa, California, where she was interviewed by railroad historian Shirley Burman and photographed by railroad photographer Richard Steinheimer in 1987. In her retirement, she helped to found the local animal shelter. She died in Mariposa in 2006, at the age of 98.
