= Wilhelmina Magdalene Stuart =

New Zealand telegraphist (1895–1985)

- Born: 9 August 1895; Dunedin, New Zealand
- Died: 3 July 1985 (aged 89); Dunedin, New Zealand
- Occupation: Telegraphist

Wilhelmina Magdalene Stuart (9 August 1895 – 3 July 1985) was a New Zealand telegraphist.

== Life ==
Stuart was born in Dunedin, to Abraham Stuart, a typesetter, and Wilhelmina (née Bohning), a seamstress.

Stuart joined the New Zealand Post and Telegraph Department in 1916, in the midst of World War I. Stuart and other women were trained as telegraph operators to replace the men off at war. In 1917, Stuart was given a permanent job at the Post and Telegraph Department's Telegraph Office in Dunedin.

Stuart faced hostility from the other male telegraphists as one of the only women in the office. She fought for equal pay and treatment for women in the telegraphist industry. After years of work, she was granted a promotion in 1944, which led the way for the Post and Telegraph Department to establish equal pay in the 1960s.

Stuart retired after a thirty-five year long career in 1951. She died in Dunedin on 3 July 1985, at the age of 89.
