= Casa del Telegrafista =

Museum in Aracataca, Colombia

Coordinates: 10.59429529°N 74.19265833°W

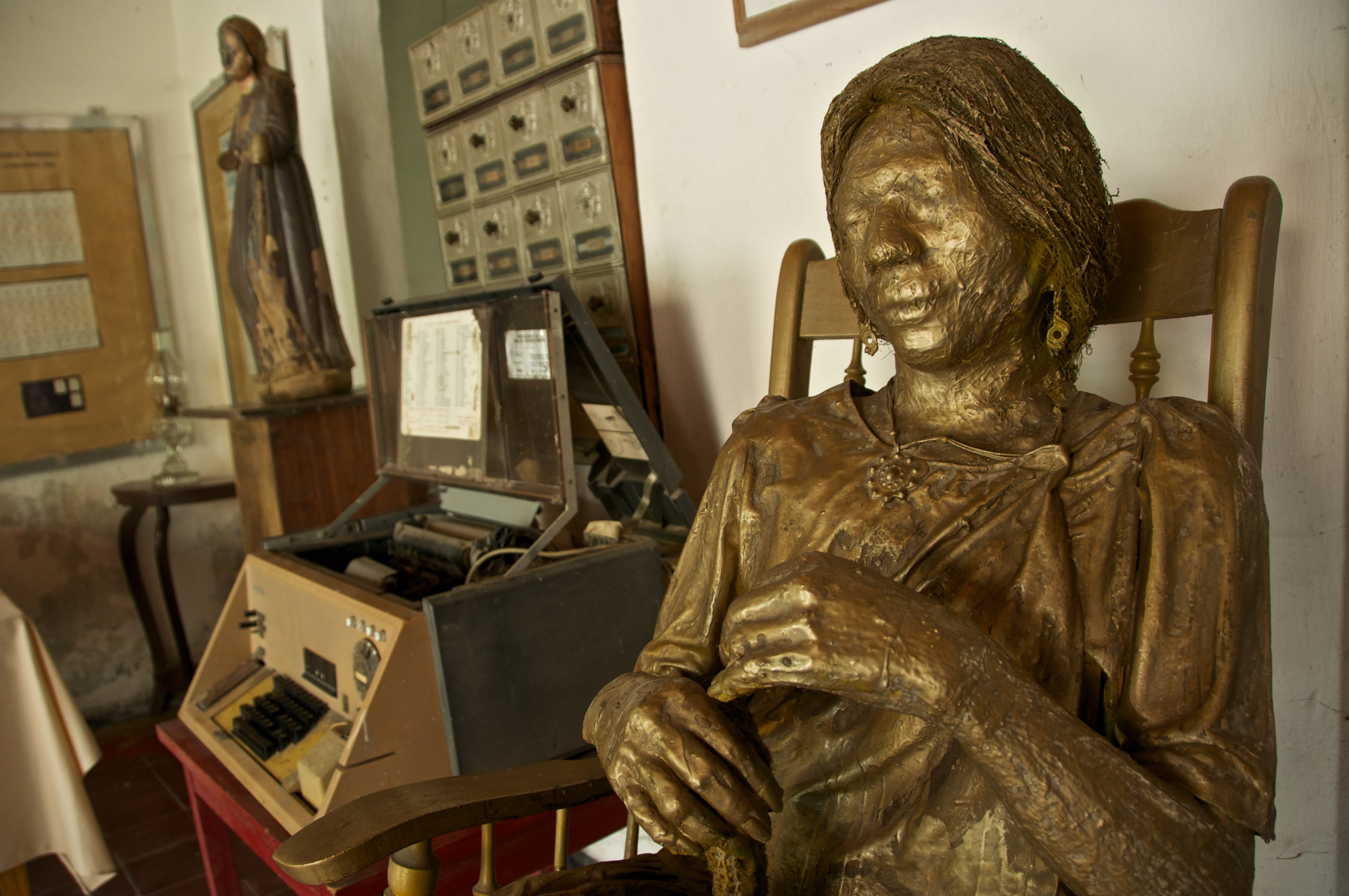
The house of the Telegraphist

Casa del Telegrafista (house of the telegrapher) is a museum in Aracataca. The town is the birthplace of author Gabriel García Márquez and photographer Leo Matiz. The museum is located to the north of the town.
