= Louisa Margaret Dunkley =

Australian telegraphist and labor organizer (1866–1927)

- Born: 28 May 1866; Richmond, Victoria, Australia
- Died: 10 March 1927 (aged 60); Longueville, New South Wales, Australia
- Occupations: Telegraphist, women's rights activist
- Years active: 1882−1920
- Organization: Victorian Women's Post and Telegraph Association

Louisa Margaret Dunkley (28 May 1866 – 10 March 1927) was an Australian telegraphist and labor organizer who successfully campaigned for the right for women to obtain equal pay for equal work in the Australian commonwealth public service.

== Early life and education ==
Louisa Margaret Dunkley was born in Richmond, Melbourne, Australia. She was the daughter of William James Dunkley, a boot importer, and Mary Ann Regan, both from London, England. She was educated at Catholic girls schools.

== Career ==
Dunkley began to work for the Postmaster-General's Department in 1882. She studied telegraphy, passing the Public Service Examination on 11 June 1887 and went on to become an operator in 1888, working in the Melbourne metropolitan post and telegraph offices. In 1890 she qualified as a telegraphist and was promoted to a position in the Chief Telegraph Office. While working as a telegraphist in the early 1890s, she became aware of the unequal pay and working conditions of the female operators. Learning of efforts by women telegraphists in New South Wales to achieve equality in pay and status, she formed a committee to advocate for similar improvements in the Post and Telegraph Department of Victoria. While her efforts resulted in pay increases for the women operators, they did not achieve equality with the male operators, and the resulting controversy resulted in her being transferred to a remote post office.

In 1900, Dunkley and other operators established the Victorian Women's Post and Telegraph Association in order to advocate for equal pay and working conditions. Mrs. Webb, a postmistress, was elected president, and Dunkley was elected vice president and spokesperson (1900–1904). She was elected as a delegate to a conference of telegraphists in Sydney in October 1900, and there presented her case for equality under the new Commonwealth Public Service conditions.

While some at the conference opposed her, she was able to secure the support of Parliament, and, as a result, a provision for equal pay for female telegraphists and postmistresses was included in the Commonwealth Public Service Act 1902. The Victorian Women's Post and Telegraph Association continued to exist within the Australian Commonwealth Post and Telegraph Association, first as a state association and then a state branch of the federal body, until 1920.

== Personal life and recognition ==
On 23 December 1903, Dunkley married Edward Charles Kraegen, in Oakleigh, Victoria secretary of the New South Wales and Commonwealth Post and Telegraph associations (1885–1904), and left the Post and Telegraph service. Edward Kraegen was the son of Carl Wilhelm Kraegen, who also worked in the postal and telegraph service, including serving as the first station master at the Overland Telegraph Line Repeater Station at the Peake, in South Australia. The couple had a daughter born in 1904, and a son born in 1906.

Newspaper clipping of the marriage notice for Edward Kraegen and Louisa Dunkley

Louisa Margaret Dunkley Kraegen died of cancer that was not identified, on 10 March 1927 in Longueville, Sydney, and is buried in Northern Suburbs Cemetery. The Victorian federal electorate of Dunkley is named after her, as is Dunkley Place in the Canberra suburb of Spence.
