= Shirley Burman =

American photographer (born 1934)

Shirley Burman (born 1934) is an American railroad photographer, historian of women's work in the railroad industry, and creator of the traveling photo exhibition, Women and the American Railroad.

== Education ==
Burman received a BA in Art from the University of California-Davis in 1972. She was an illustrator for the California State Parks in 1974, and a documentary photographer for the U.S. federal government in 1976.

== Career ==
She resumed employment with the California State Parks in 1978 as a photographer for the California State Railroad Museum's restoration projects.

Since 1983, Burman has been a self-employed railroad photographer and designer. Together with her late husband, the railroad photographer Richard Steinheimer, she produced a book, Whistles Across the Land, in 1994. She lives in Sacramento, California.

Burman established a non-profit corporation called The Women's Railroad History Project. It is a repository for oral histories, photographic and artifact collections, and other historical research. Selections from Burman's international traveling exhibitions Women and the American Railroad TM were compiled into a 1995 wall calendar "Women and the American Railroad."

In 2012 she was awarded the Fred A and Jane R Stindt Photography Award for her railway photography and her work documenting women's contributions to railroading.

== Publications ==
- Steinheimer, Richard, and Burman, Shirley, Whistles Across the Land: A Love Affair with Trains. San Rafael, CA: CEDCO Publishing Company, 1993. ISBN 1-55912-505-5.Sh
- Burman, Shirley. "Women and the American Railroad, a calendar for 1995." Cedco Publishing Company, San Rafael, CA, 1994. ISBN 1-55912-637-X
- Levinson, Nancy Smiler, and Burman, Shirley, She's Been Working on the Railroad. New York: Dutton, 1997. ISBN 978-0-525-67545-7.
- Burman, Shirley, "Women and the American Railroad - Documentary Photography," Journal of the West, April 1994, 36-41.
- Shirley Burman. "Women and Railroading". Trains Railroad History, November 16, 2009.
- Burman, Shirley. Sisters of the Iron Road. SBS Publishing, Sacramento, CA, 2022. ISBN 978-1-7923-9442-3.
