= Richard Steinheimer =

American photographer (1929 - 2011)

- Born: Richard Virgil Dean Steinheimer; August 23, 1929; Chicago, Illinois, U.S.
- Died: May 4, 2011 (aged 81)
- Occupation: Railroad photographer

Richard Virgil Dean Steinheimer (August 23, 1929 – May 4, 2011) was an American railroad photographer from Sacramento, California. His work has been published in Trains Magazine, Railfan, Locomotive and Railway Preservation and Vintage Rail and more than seventy books. A pioneer in railroad photography, Steinheimer lived through and documented the railroads' heyday and their transition to diesel motive power from steam. He is one of few photographers who took into account the aesthetics of all locomotives from steam engines to the latest diesel-powered behemoths. He had a particular fondness for the landscape of the American West and many of his images situate trains in the larger geography and culture of the time. Steinheimer was known for taking pictures at night, in bad weather, and from risky perches on top of moving trains. His photograph, "Southern Pacific steam helper at Saugus, California, 1947," was included in the Center for Railroad Photography and Art's 20 Memorable Railroad Photographs of the 20th Century.

== Early life ==
Richard Steinheimer was born in Chicago in 1929. His parents divorced in 1935, and he, with his mother and sister, moved to Phoenix, Arizona. It was this trip that first exposed him to trains. In 1939 his family moved to Glendale, California. The Southern Pacific main line was adjacent to his home.

== Career ==
In 1945 he started his photographic career with a Kodak Baby Brownie, shooting wartime traffic in the common 3/4 "wedgies" style. Also, in 1945 he received two books by Lucius Beebe, Highball and High Iron, from which he drew inspiration. By 1946 his photos had evolved into more of an experimental style. In 1946 he began using an Argus A-2 camera, and in 1947 he started using a 3 1/4×4 1/4 Speed Graphic. With the Speed Graphic now in hand, he made very well regarded photos. He used yard lights, flashbulbs or whatever lights were available. His night work predates O. Winston Link's by almost seven years. By 1949 he was going to San Francisco City College and one of his teachers was Joe Rosenthal. In 1955 he married his first wife Nona, the two would later separate. From 1956 through 1962 he worked for the Marin Independent Journal as a photojournalist. Kalmbach Publishing produced in 1963 his Backwoods Railroad of the West. Although it failed commercially at the time, it later became a very valuable and sought-after books on railroads.

From 1948 through 2001 Trains Magazine published over 400 of his photographs.

Steinheimer has become very well regarded, especially across the Western USA, but also pursued a lesser-known career in commercial photography. His specialties included the use of telephoto lenses in railroad scenes, and a devotion to Southern Pacific's Donner Pass crossing of the Sierra Nevada. Steinheimer would meet his future wife, Shirley Burman at a reception for his photos at the California State Railroad Museum in 1983; and the two would start dating while on overnight photography trips together to the desert. The two were married the following year.

In 2000 Steinheimer was diagnosed with Alzheimer's disease; he suffered a stroke in September 2007. He was cared for throughout his illness by his wife Shirley. He died on May 4, 2011. In 2012 Shirley along with Richard's friends and family would travel to the Mojave Desert to scatter his ashes per an epitaph Steinheimer had written for himself in 1982 "Toss my ashes out into the desert around Ash Hill... Let me take one hundred years to know this desert."

An exhibition featuring many of his popular images were held at the Robert Mann Gallery in Manhattan, December 15, 2011, through January 21, 2012.

The majority of Richard Steinheimer's photography collection was donated to the Center for Railroad Photography & Art in mid 2022. The Center has received about 30,000 color slides and a large collection of black and white prints and scans, and negatives from 1975 onward.

== Online references ==
- The Center for Railroad Photography and Art
- Amazon ad for A Passion for Trains
