= Ella Cheever Thayer =

American novelist

- Born: September 14, 1849; Portland, Maine, United States
- Died: October 28, 1925 (aged 76); Boston, Massachusetts, United States
- Occupations: Novelist; Playwright; Telegraphist
- Writing career
- Period: 1879–1897
- Genre: Fiction
- Subject: Romance
- Literary movement: Suffragette

Ella Cheever Thayer (September 14, 1849 – October 28, 1925) was an American playwright and novelist. Born in Maine, she worked as a telegraph operator and published several works in her lifetime, including the hit 1879 novel Wired Love: A Romance in Dots and Dashes.

== Biography ==
She was the daughter of apothecary George Augusta Thayer (1824-1863) and Rachel Ella Cheever Thayer (1823-1907). One sister, Mary Georgie Thayer (1869-1912), was a schoolteacher. Thayer eventually became a telegraph operator at the Brunswick Hotel in Boston, Massachusetts, who used her experience on the telegraph as the basis for her book Wired Love, A Romance of Dots and Dashes, which became a bestseller for 10 years.

She was also a playwright, having written The Lords of Creation in 1883. Her play is reviewed in the book On to Victory: Propaganda Plays of the Woman's Suffrage Movement by Bettina Friedl, published in 1990 (ISBN 1-55553-073-7) and it was one of the first suffragette plays.

She also wrote Amber, a Daughter of Bohemia, a drama in five acts, in 1883. She also wrote short stories for magazines including "The Forgotten Past" in Argosy (January 1897).

== Later life and death ==
She lived in Saugus, Massachusetts. Thayer died of liver cancer; her ashes were placed in Bigelow Chapel, Mount Auburn Cemetery, Cambridge, Massachusetts on November 1, 1925.
