= Seeb Chunder Nandy =

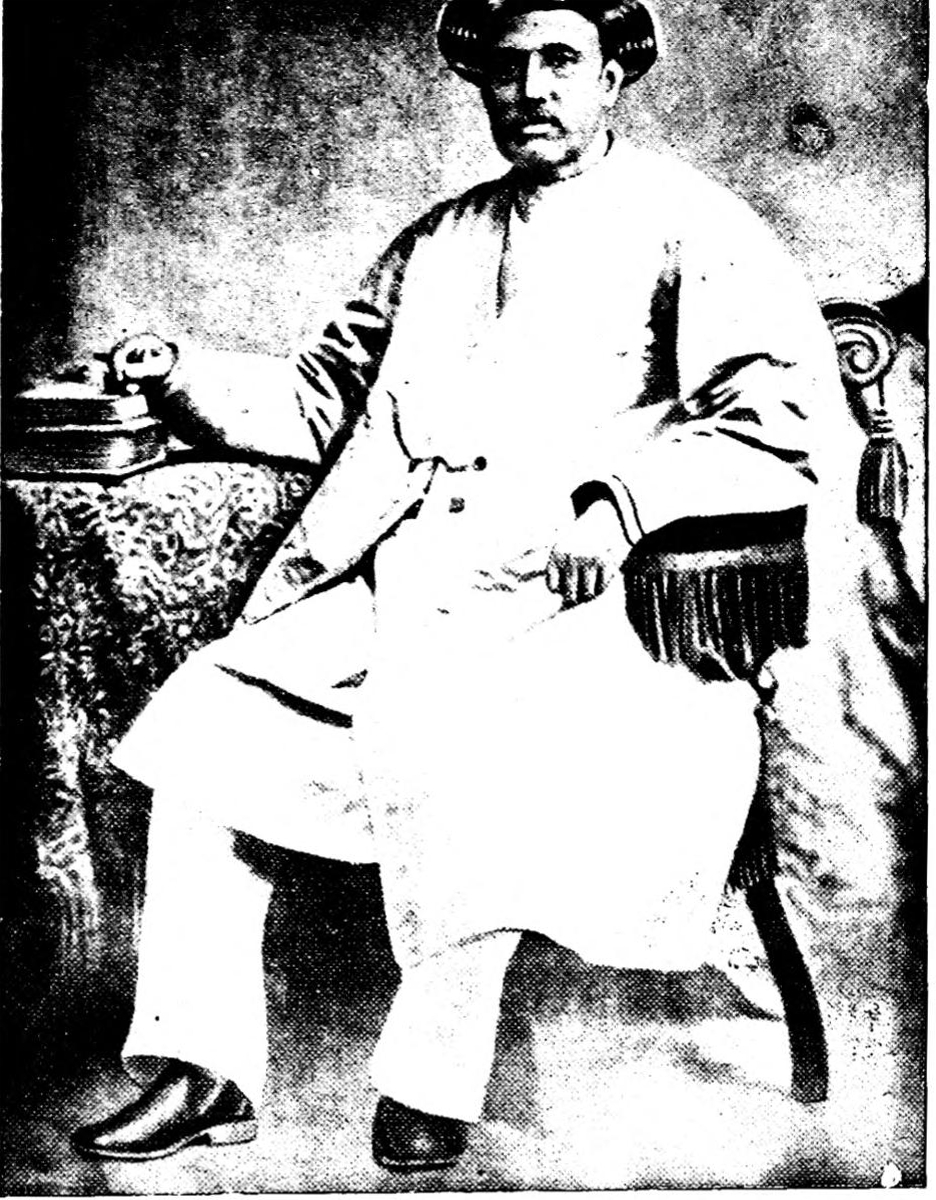

Seebchunder Nandy or Sib Chandra Nundy (June 1824 – 6 April 1903) was an Indian Bengali telegraphy official who worked on the first telegraph lines established in British India. He helped install and maintain the first telegraph lines between Agra and Calcutta using innovative approaches to reduce the cost of installation.

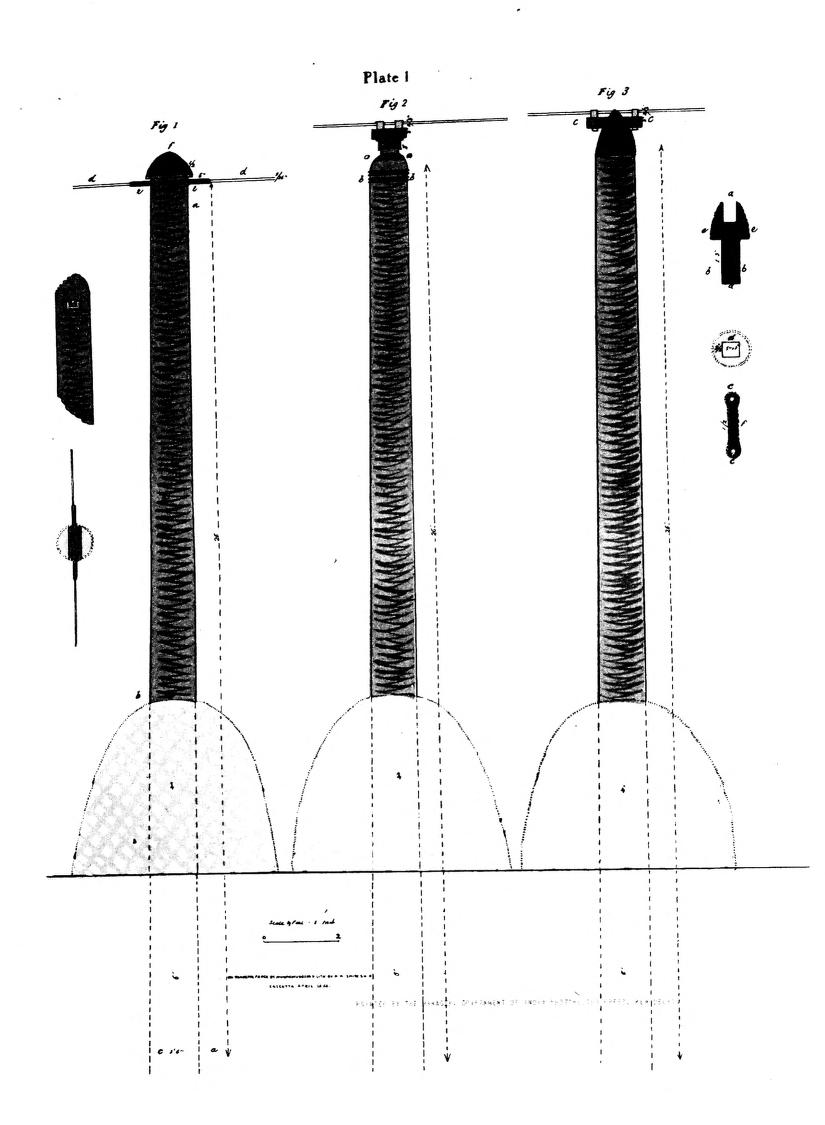
Design of posts using toddy palms by Seeb Chunder Nandy

Born in a family of modest means in Calcutta, he worked at the refinery of the Calcutta Mint from 1846 under William Brooke O'Shaughnessy. When O'Shaughnessy started working on the first telegraphic line in India, he made use of Nandy as his assistant. Nandy tested the first line signalling from Diamond Harbour to O'Shaughnessy in Calcutta in a demonstration made to Lord Dalhousie. Nandy later became a line inspector in charge of training signallers. In 1866 he became an assistant superintendent and just before retiring the next year he was given the title of Rai Bahadur on 28 February 1883.

Among Nandy's achievements was in the low-cost installation of lines. Using fishing boats he helped lay 7 miles of underwater cable across the river Padma at a very low cost. He also used palm trees as posts when he was given charge to lay down 900 miles through East Barrakur-Allahabad, Banares-Mirzapur-Seonee, and Calcutta to Dacca. The palm tree as a post was later incorporated into the telegraphy manual. He also served as a treasurer for the Asiatic Society of Bengal in 1849–50.

He was given a special mention in Sir Roper Lethbridge's The Golden Book of India for his services during the mutiny of 1857. On 19 April 1902 he was present at the opening of the Mutiny Telegraph Memorial. He died of plague on 6 April 1903 during an epidemic in Calcutta and the local Telegraph Office was closed for the day.

== Legacy ==
A lane at Burrabazar in Kolkata was named after him in 1904 as Shib Nandi Lane.
