= Leo Matiz =

Colombian photographer and artist (1917–1998)

- Born: April 1, 1917
- Died: October 24, 1998 (aged 81)
- Children: Leo Matiz, Sergio Matiz, Maya Matiz and Alejandra Matiz
- Website: https://www.fundacionleomatiz.org

Leonet Matiz Espinoza (April 1, 1917 – October 24, 1998) was a Colombian photographer, caricaturist, newspaper publisher, painter and gallery owner.

== Early life ==
Matiz was born in the small village of Aracataca in the Magdalena Department of Colombia to father Tulio Matiz and mother Eva Matiz. His hometown is also the birthplace of Gabriel García Márquez. He travelled widely and sold caricatures and illustrations to earn a living. In 1951, Matiz's gallery hosted the first exhibition of Colombian artist Fernando Botero with a showing of his paintings at the Bogotá gallery.

== Career ==
Matiz was known for his sense of style including a thick slightly long hair, colored jackets, and gangster style mustache. He had a robust laugh and carried his caricatures and drawings in a folder. He was at the center of the bohemian intellectualism of Bogotá, Caracas, Mexico City and other Latin American capital centers.

He photographed Frida Kahlo, Diego Rivera, Esther Williams, Janice Logan, David Alfaro Siqueiros, the first castings of María Félix, Luis Buñuel, Marc Chagall, Louis Armstrong, Álvaro Mutis, Pablo Neruda, Walt Disney, Enrique Santos Montejo, “Calibán”, Lucho Bermúdez, Agustín Lara, Gabriel Figueroa, Esther Fernandez, José Clemente Orozco, Mario Moreno Cantinflas, and Dolores del Río.

He was influenced by Mexican cinema, geography, architecture, history, muralism, and history as well as the artists Gustave Doré, George Grozt, Nadar and Guadalupe Posada. He was a photographer for Asi, Life, Reader's Digest, Harper Magazine, Look and Norte. He had a high profile and intense dispute with David Alfaro Siqueiros.

== Exhibitions ==
- 2013: "Leo Matiz, Gazing at the Infinite." Colombian National Museum, Bogotá (April 4, 2013 – May 19, 2013)
- 2001: “Retrospective. Rare photographs from the Estate of Leo Matiz.” Curated by James Cavello (May 3 - June 28) WESTWOOD GALLERY NYC

== Personal life ==
Later in life, Matiz lost an eye after a robber hit him with a wooden stick and tried to steal his camera and bicycle. He continued photographing with an eye patch. Matiz died in Bogotá, Colombia, on October 24, 1998. The Foundation Leo Matiz was established to preserve his legacy.
