= Ciénaga Grande de Santa Marta =

Swampy marsh in Colombia

Coordinates: 10°52′N 74°25′W

Designations

Ramsar Wetland
- Official name: Sistema Delta Estuarino del Río Magdalena, Ciénaga Grande de Santa Marta
- Designated: 18 June 1998
- Reference no.: 951

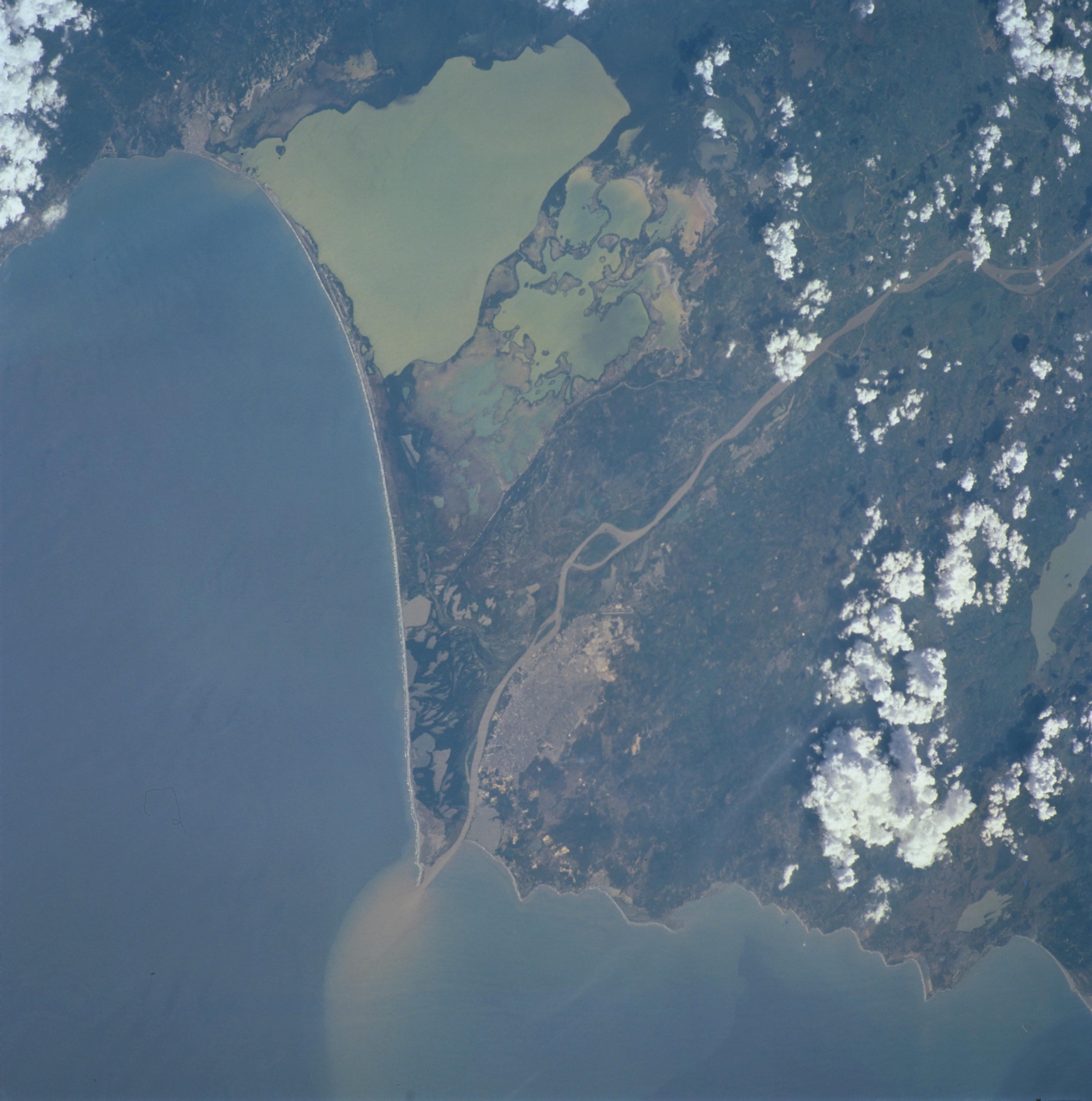
In this satellite image, the Ciénaga Grande de Santa Marta is the greenish area at top, bordered by the Caribbean Sea on the left.

The Ciénaga Grande de Santa Marta (Spanish for Large Marsh of Saint Martha) is the largest of the swampy marshes located in Colombia between the Magdalena River and the Sierra Nevada de Santa Marta. It has an area of 4,280 square kilometres (1,650 sq mi) and belongs to the outer delta system of the Madgalena River. It is separated from the Caribbean Sea by a narrow, sandy artificial spit built in the 1950s, on which is situated coastal route 90 from Barranquilla to Santa Marta. The marsh's large lagoon is connected to the Caribbean Sea via a narrow strait (the La Barra channel) located between the town of Pueblo Viejo and the city of Ciénaga.

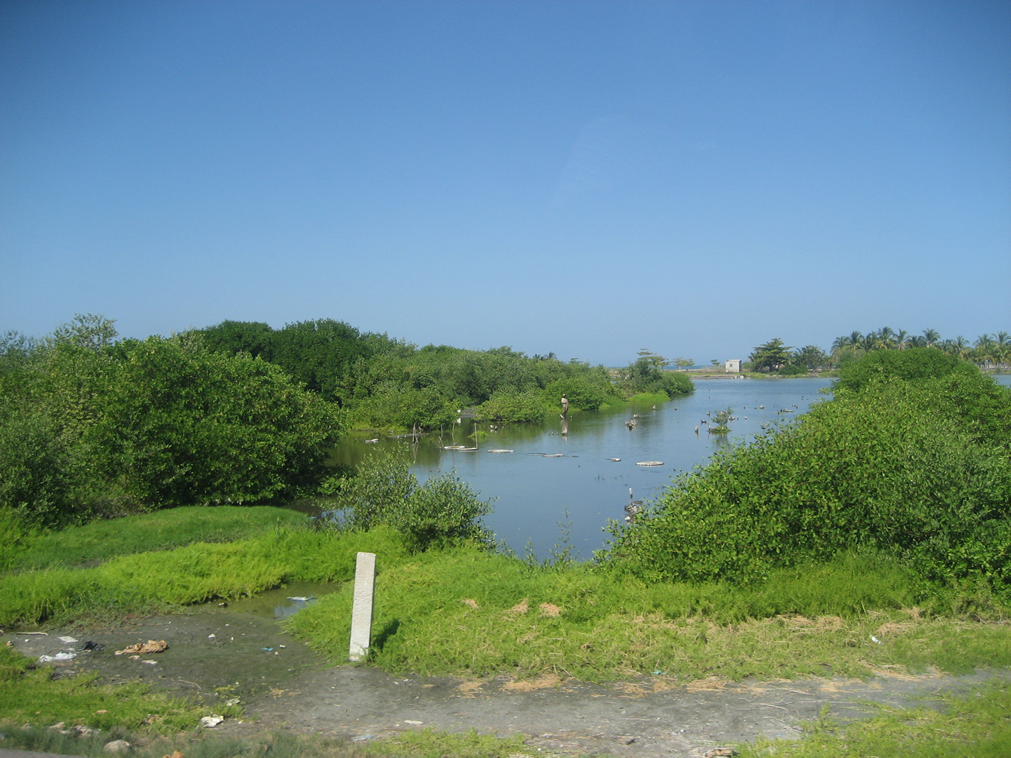
Vegetation by the Ciénaga Grande de Santa Marta near the town of Ciénaga

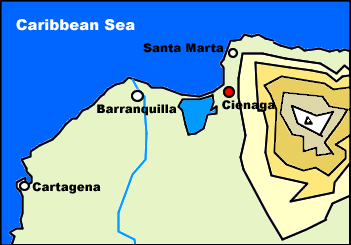

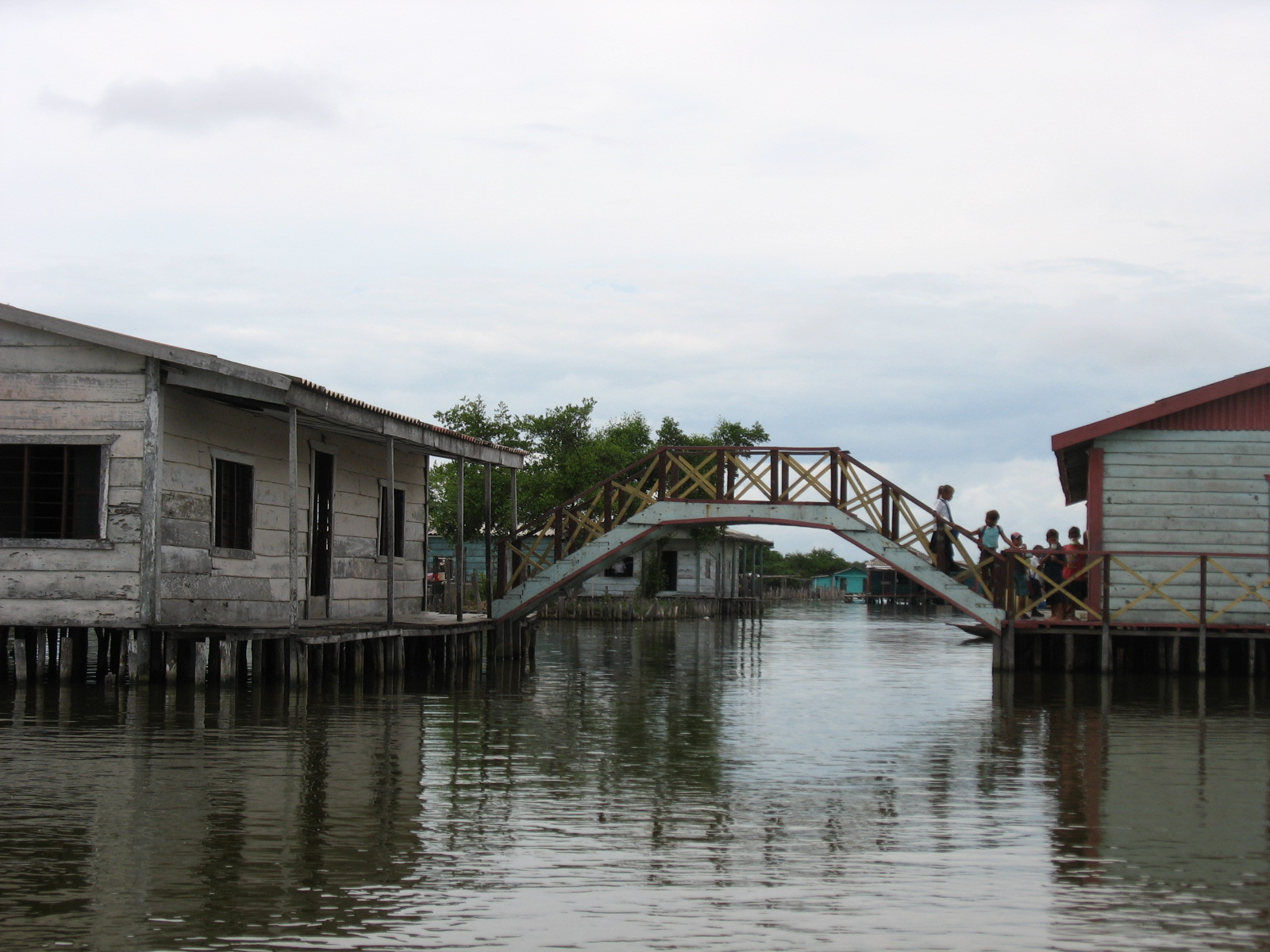
Palafitos in marsh
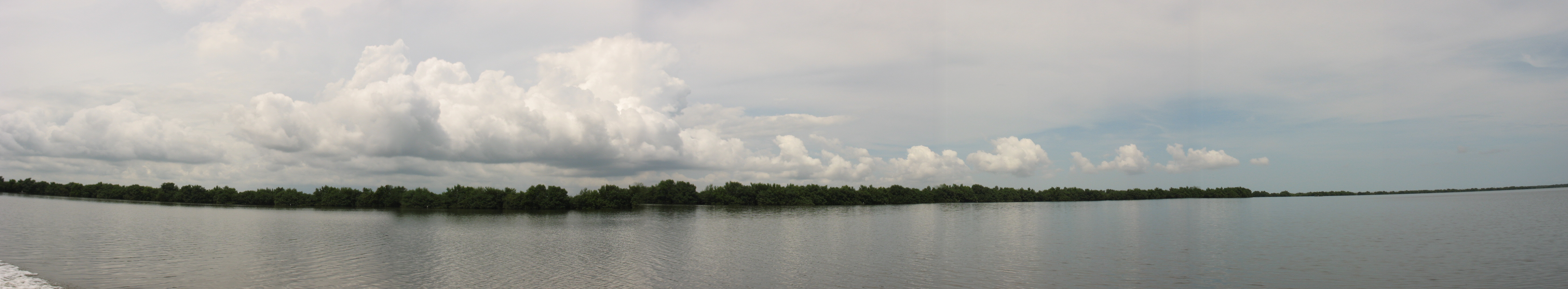
Panorama of Ciénaga Grande de Santa Marta from 2006-10-12
