= Emma Hunter (telegrapher) =

American telegraph operator (1831–1904)

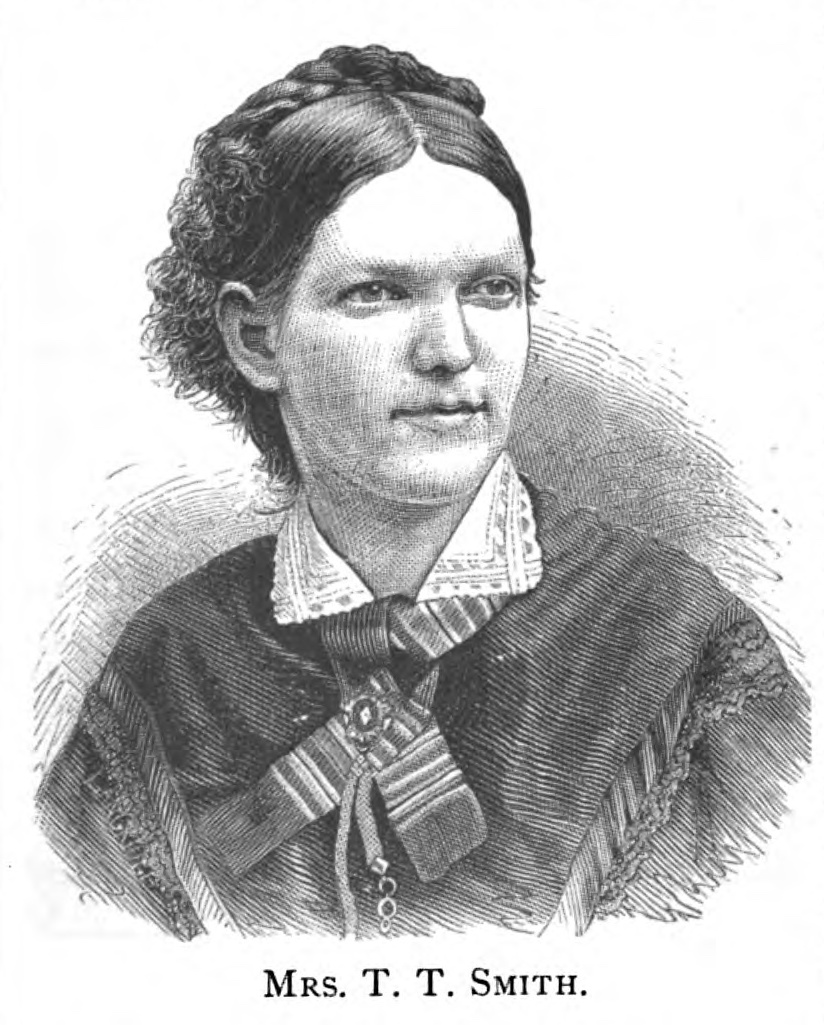
- Born: 1831; Meadville, Pennsylvania, U.S.
- Died: 1904 (aged 73); West Chester, Pennsylvania, U.S.
- Occupation: Telegrapher
- Employer: Western Union
- Known for: First electronic commuter and one of the first female telegraph operators in the United States

Emma A. Hunter (1831–1904) was an American telegraph operator from West Chester, Pennsylvania. She was hired by the Atlantic and Ohio Telegraph Company in 1851 and worked as a telegrapher until 1868. She is known as the second female telegrapher in Pennsylvania, preceded only by Helen Plummer of Greenville in 1850. Although she was widely noted in her lifetime as the first female telegrapher in the United States, historical research has shown she was not. However, she may have been the first telecommuter, as Thomas Jepsen has argued.

== Life and career ==
Hunter was born in Meadville, Pennsylvania, in 1831. After her father's death, Hunter's mother Agnes relocated the family to West Chester in 1848. To support herself and her children, she opened a store on Church Street, which sold books and stationery. Emma, along with her brother John, grew up working in the family business, which is where she probably learned her bookkeeping skills.

In 1851, local businessman Uriah Hunt Painter installed the first telegraph wires in West Chester. Painter, who was a relative of Hunter, taught her the basics of telegraphy and recommended her hire by the Atlantic and Ohio Telegraph Company (which later became Western Union). Hunter reportedly suggested that she work from home rather than from an office, saving the company money while adhering to the era's separate spheres ideology that confined women to the domestic sphere.

We remember well that the wires were introduced into a neat sitting room of a home in Westchester [sic], Pa., where, with the instrument on one side and a work basket on the other, our new assistant sent and received her messages, and filled up the interim in fixing her Sunday bonnet, or embroidering articles of raiment which a gentleman editor is not expected to know or name.

— James D. Reid, "The Telegraphic Education of Women"

Using the telegraphic pseudonym (known as a sine) "Emma of S," Hunter quickly gained a reputation in the company as one of their most capable telegraphers. Her male coworkers reportedly treated her respectfully and apologized when she called out their mistakes. At the end of her first year of work, her annual salary was increased by management from $50 per year to $144 annually. She also received a bonus of $150. As the lines grew busier and the social stigma of being a female telegrapher faded, in 1857, Hunter moved her office to her mother's store. Later, she relocated to East Gay Street, working out of the Pennsylvania Railroad depot.

Hunter remained a telegraph operator until 1868, when she became a clerk at the Bank of Chester County. In 1869, she was invited to New York to help unveil a monument to Samuel Morse, but ill health forced her to decline the invitation. The following year, she married tobacco merchant Thomas T. Smith and went on to have two children. Now using the name Emma Smith, she lived her remaining life in West Chester.

== Death and legacy ==
Smith died at the age of 73 at her home in West Chester on December 21, 1904. She was widely described at her death as the first female telegrapher in the United States, though later historians have disproved this claim. Thomas Jepsen, a writer who focuses on the history of technology, has argued that she was the world's earliest electronic commuter, as she worked from her home to send and receive telegraph messages and keep the company's books.
