= Pueblo Viejo, Magdalena =

Coordinates: 10.9972°N 74.2875°W

Pueblo Viejo
- town
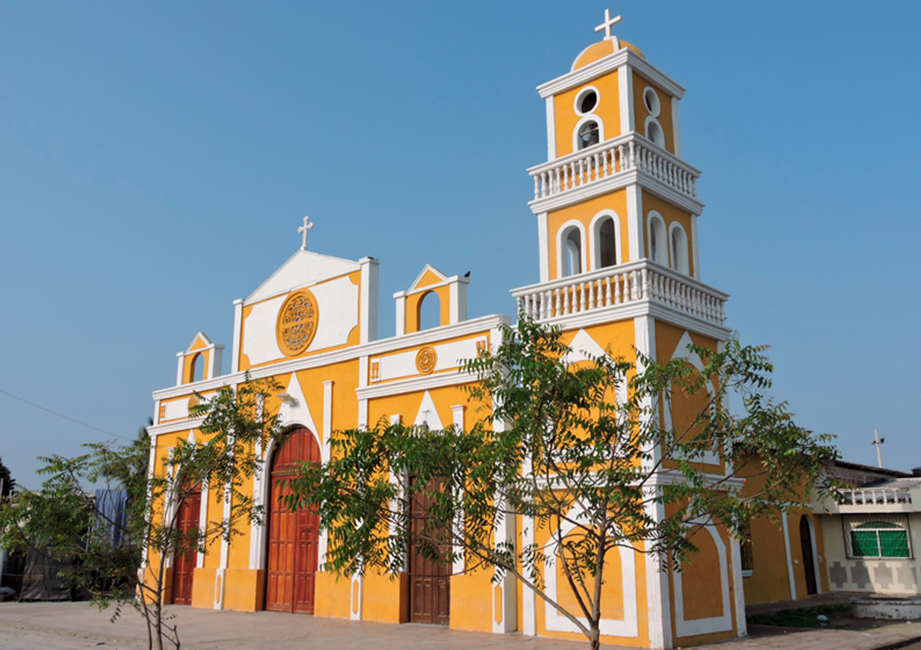

- Flag Coat of arms

- Location of the municipality and town of Pueblo Viejo in the Department of Magdalena.
- Country: Colombia
- Region: Caribbean
- Department: Magdalena
- Foundation: 1526

Population (2020 est.)
  - Total: 33,720
- Time zone: UTC-5
- Website: www.puebloviejo-magdalena.gov.co

Puebloviejo is a town and municipality of the Colombian Department of Magdalena. It was founded in 1526 by friar Tomas Ortíz. It was erected a municipality on May 3, 1929. The town lies on a natural thin division between the Ciénaga Grande de Santa Marta marshes and the Caribbean Sea.

== Politics ==
=== Administrative divisions ===
Corregimientos:

- Bocas de Aracataca
- Islas del Rosario
- Palmira
- Tasajera
- Palos
- Prietos
