= Victorian Women's Post and Telegraph Association =

Australian women's association

The Victorian Women's Post and Telegraph Association was founded in 1900 at a time when women were banned from joining the existing Post and Telegraph Association. At the time, women regularly performed duties in post offices and worked as telegraphists, but were being paid significantly less than their male counterparts. The members of the Victorian postmistresses discussed their unfair payment to the Victorian Colonial Service Classification Board, who then granted higher pay rather than equal pay. It was not until 1895 when females received equal pay in the work force.

The association continued its existence within the Australian Commonwealth Post and Telegraph Association as a state association and then a state branch of the federal body until 1920.
