= Mary Macaulay =

American labor union official (1865–1944)

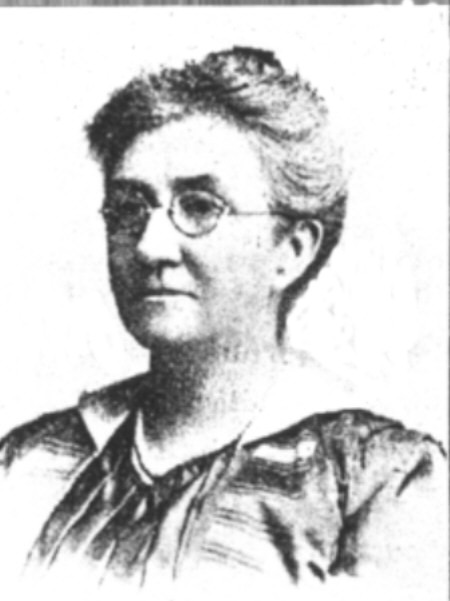
Mary Macaulay, International Vice President, Commercial Telegraphers Union of America. Source: Commercial Telegraphers' Journal, 1919, p. 458.

Mary Macaulay (January 27, 1865 – July 19, 1944) was a telegraph operator and labor union official who became International Vice President of the Commercial Telegraphers Union of America (CTUA) in 1919. She was the first woman telegrapher to hold a national elective office in a union.

== Involvement with telegraphers' unions and the suffrage movement ==
In about 1880, she began work as a commercial operator for Western Union. She joined the telegraphers' union, the Brotherhood of Telegraphers, which was affiliated with the Knights of Labor. She joined in their strike against Western Union in 1883. When the strike ended unsuccessfully, she left Western Union and began work as a press operator in Amsterdam, New York, where she sent and received press dispatches. This was the beginning of a long career as a press telegrapher; she subsequently operated for the Rochester Post Express in Rochester, New York, the Consolidated wire at the Buffalo Evening News in Buffalo, New York, and for the United Press Association in the offices of the Lockport Union Sun in Lockport, New York. While in Lockport, she was elected vice president of Local 41 of the CTUA.

Macaulay was an early supporter of the women's suffrage movement; during her employment in Rochester, she also served as secretary to Susan B. Anthony.

== 1919 strike and election as international vice president ==
In June 1919, the CTUA went on strike against Western Union after the telegraph company discharged several telegraphers for belonging to the union. However, the strike was unsuccessful; after the union's president, S. J. Konenkamp, resigned, a new slate of officers was elected, including Mary Macaulay, who became International Vice President. One of her first actions was to set up a defense fund for strikers who had been arrested in Oklahoma City, Oklahoma. In the following year, federal charges against the strikers were dropped. She served as International Vice President until 1921.

== Later life and retirement ==
In 1927, she retired from her work as press telegrapher for the Lockport Union Sun and returned to LeRoy, New York. She was an active member of Saint Peter's Catholic Church in that city, and left her entire estate to the church in her will. Macaulay died on July 19, 1944, at the age of 79.
