= Deaths in July 1985 =

The following is a list of notable deaths in July 1985.

Entries for each day are listed alphabetically by surname. A typical entry lists information in the following sequence:

- Name, age, country of citizenship at birth, subsequent country of citizenship (if applicable), reason for notability, cause of death (if known), and reference.

== July 1985 ==
=== 1 ===
- Pedro Aleandro, 74, Argentine actor.
- Adolf Andersson, 97, Swedish Olympic swimmer (1908).
- Maxwell Frederic Coplan, 73, American photographer.
- Lonnie Hillyer, 45, American jazz trumpeter, cancer.
- Ian Hull, 69, Australian footballer.
- Bogusław Leśnodorski, 71, Polish historian.
- Clarence H. Lobo, 72, American Acjachemen tribal spokesman.
- Desmond McMullen, 67, British flying ace.
- Mertz Mortorelli, 64, American football coach.
- Pauli Murray, 74, American priest and civil rights activist, pancreatic cancer.
- Wallace Sterling, 78, American academic administrator.
- Marcel Thibaud, 88, French politician.
- Thomas Patrick Thornton, 87, American jurist.
- Jean Van Den Bosch, 86, Belgian Olympic racing cyclist (1924).

=== 2 ===
- Ruth M. Briggs, 74, American soldier and politician.
- Guy Bush, 83, American baseball player.
- Edward Evarts, 59, American neuroscientist, heart attack.
- Luang Pu Waen Suciṇṇo, 98, Thai Buddhist monk.
- James Minter, 67, Australian cricketer.
- Hector Nicol, 64, Scottish comedian, singer, and actor.
- David Purley, 40, British racing driver, plane crash.
- Red Watkins, 80, American football and baseball coach.
- D. Ray White, 58, American mountain dancer, shot.
- Eric Wilson, 84, American Olympic track and field athlete (1924).

=== 3 ===
- Erik Ågren, 69, Swedish Olympic boxer (1936).
- Bob Baker, 68, Australian politician.
- Charles Herbert Colvin, 92, American aeronautical engineer.
- Irvin Ehrenpreis, 65, American literary scholar, fall.
- Frank Engledow, 94, British botanist.
- Rodolfo Ghioldi, 94, Argentine politician.
- Ferdinand Haberl, 79, German composer and theologian.
- Herbert Hirschman, 71, American television producer.
- Patricia Hornsby-Smith, Baroness Hornsby-Smith, 71, British politician, MP (1950–1966, 1970–1974) and member of the House of Lords (since 1974).
- Nelson Leigh, 80, American actor.
- Nils Meinander, 74, Finnish politician.
- Rutherford George Montgomery, 91, American children's author.
- Friedrich Ruge, 90, German naval admiral.
- Frank J. Selke, 92, Canadian ice hockey executive.
- Roger Seydoux, 77, French diplomat.
- Mary Steel Stevenson, 88, Scottish-born Australian politician.
- Wilhelmina Magdalene Stuart, 89, New Zealand telegraphist.
- Cooney Weiland, 80, Canadian ice hockey player.

=== 4 ===
- Haakon Chevalier, 83, American writer and translator.
- Cecil Cook, 87, Australian physician.
- Jan de Quay, 83, Dutch politician, prime minister (1959–1963).
- Moussa Diakité, 57-58, Guinean politician, executed.
- Henry Ellenbogen, 85, Austrian-born American politician and jurist, member of the U.S. House of Representatives (1933–1938).
- Edward V. Gant, 66-67, American academic administrator.
- Joseph P. Monaghan, 79, American politician, member of the U.S. House of Representatives (1933–1937).
- George Oldfield, 61, English police detective, heart failure.
- Mamba Sano, 81-82, Guinean politician.
- Lotte Strauss, 72, German-American pathologist.
- Willem Visser 't Hooft, 84, Dutch theologian, emphysema.
- Frank Walsh, 79, American baseball umpire.
- Chris Woods, 59, American jazz saxophonist.

=== 5 ===
- Ethel H. Bailey, 88, American engineer.
- Margery C. Carlson, 92, American botanist.
- Barry Crane, 57, American television producer and bridge player, bludgeoned.
- Charles J. Ducey, 79, American Knights of Columbus fraternity leader.
- Edgar Dunbar, 83, Australian footballer.
- Bladen Hawke, 9th Baron Hawke, 83, British politician and hereditary peer.
- Ken Kuronuma, 83, Japanese novelist.
- Bill Luckett, 81, English footballer.
- Raoul Palmer, 80, French gynecologist.
- Jack Robertson, 79, South African cricketer.
- Paulino Uzcudun, 86, Spanish boxer.
- Mario Vušković, 31, Yugoslav Croatian footballer, traffic collision.

=== 6 ===
- C. Douglas Cairns, 71, American politician.
- Frederick Kaufman, 65, Austrian-American chemist, respiratory disease.
- John Schneider Jr., 66, American politician.
- Cecil Herbert Sharpley, 76, English-born Australian politician and trade unionist.
- Marion Webster, 64, Canadian-American biochemist.
- Nikolai Yegipko, 81, Soviet naval admiral.

=== 7 ===
- Irma Andersson-Kottö, 90, Swedish botanist.
- Charles R. Clason, 94, American politician, member of the U.S. House of Representatives (1937–1949).
- György Harag, 60, Romanian actor and director.
- Sharafat Hussain Khan, 55, Indian singer, lung cancer.
- Shōzō Sakurai, 96, Japanese general.
- John Scarne, 82, American magician and author.
- Ewen Solon, 67, New Zealand-British actor.
- Fernando Tropea, 80, Italian film editor.
- Ljubov Nikolaevna Vassiljeva, 84, Soviet botanist.
- Laron Williams, 36, American convicted serial killer, beaten.
- Volodymyr Yurkevych, 72, Soviet Ukrainian bandurist.

=== 8 ===
- Wim Addicks, 88, Dutch footballer.
- Rebekah Colberg, 66, Puerto Rican athlete.
- Gardner Cowles Jr., 82, American newspaper magnate.
- Phil Foster, 72, American actor (Laverne & Shirley), heart attack.
- Frank Hampson, 66, British cartoonist, stroke.
- Simon Kuznets, 84, Russian-American economist, Nobel Prize recipient (1971).
- Jean-Paul Le Chanois, 75, French filmmaker.
- Niall Molloy, 52, Irish Roman Catholic priest, murdered.
- Solomon Pekar, 68, Soviet Ukrainian theoretical physicist.
- Victor Rendina, 68, American actor.
- Ursula Batchelder Stone, 85, American business researcher.
- Guinean politicians executed on this date:
  - Mamadi Keïta, 51-52.
  - Ismaël Touré, 59.
  - Diarra Traoré, 49-50, prime minister (1984).

=== 9 ===
- Trygve Braarud, 81, Norwegian botanist.
- Rafael Campos, 49, American actor, stomach cancer.
- Charlotte, Grand Duchess of Luxembourg, 89, Luxembourgish monarch, grand duchess (1919–1964).
- Milo Cipra, 78, Yugoslav Croatian composer.
- David R. Goddard, 77, American plant physiologist.
- Pierre-Paul Grassé, 89, French zoologist.
- Luiz Henrique Rosa, 46, Brazilian musician, traffic collision.
- Kuuno Honkonen, 63, Finnish politician and Olympic high jumper (1948).
- Arne Odd Johnsen, 75, Norwegian historian.
- Jimmy Kinnon, 74, Scottish-born American support group founder (Narcotics Anonymous), lung cancer.
- James Rupert Lawson, 67, American Black nationalist activist, complications from a stroke.
- Kārlis Lobe, 90, Latvian soldier.
- Margaret Molesworth, 90, Australian tennis player.
- Wout Steenhuis, 62, Dutch musician.

=== 10 ===
- Keith Fleming, 75, Australian footballer.
- Ahsan Habib, 68, Bangladeshi poet.
- Kai Holm, 89, Danish actor.
- John Kavanagh, 72, New Zealand Roman Catholic prelate.
- Nat G. Kiefer, 46, American politician, member of the Louisiana State Senate (since 1970), liver disease.
- Bill Morgan, 75, American football player.
- Hilgard Muller, 71, South African politician and diplomat.
- Arthur J. Ornitz, 68, American cinematographer.
- Fernando Pereira, 35, Portuguese-Dutch photographer, drowned.
- Zenon Stefaniuk, 55, Polish boxer.

=== 11 ===
- John Boulicault, 79, American Olympic racing cyclist (1924).
- Chu Chia-Jen, 84-85, Chinese aviation engineer.
- George Duvivier, 64, American jazz bassist, cancer.
- Roberto Genta, 78, Argentine Olympic sprinter (1932).
- Taneli Kekkonen, 56, Finnish diplomat, suicide by hanging.
- Galina Kopernak, 83, Russian-American actress.
- Timoteus Pokora, 57, Czechoslovak Sinologist.
- Gil Robinson, 75, American football player.
- Georges Verriest, 75, French footballer.

=== 12 ===
- Sir Robertson Crichton, 72, British jurist.
- Thomas Galbraith, 1st Baron Strathclyde, 94, Scottish politician and hereditary peer, MP (1940–1955) and member of the House of Lords (since 1955).
- Gene McEver, 76, American football player and coach.
- Grady Louis McMurtry, 66, American magician and occultist.
- Arnold Miller, 62, American miner and labor activist.
- Kevin O'Neill, 77, Australian footballer.
- Clemens Pasch, 74, German artist.
- Lettice Ramsey, 86, British photographer.
- Max Rippon, 64, Australian footballer.
- H. J. Ryser, 61, American mathematician.
- Tokkie Smith, 50-51, South African-Hong Kong football executive, traffic collision.
- Serm Vinicchayakul, 78, Thai economist and politician.

=== 13 ===
- Joe Aguirre, 66, American football player.
- Charles K. Bliss, 87, Austrian-Australian semiotician.
- Claudio Cassinelli, 46, Italian actor, helicopter crash.
- Stokeley Fulton, 55, American college sports coach, cancer.
- Sir Derrick Gunston, 94, British politician, MP (1924–1945).
- Matthias Hoogen, 81, German politician, member of the Bundestag (1949–1964).
- Dorothy Houston Jacobson, 77, American political scientist.
- Hermann Lehmann, 75, German-born British physician and biochemist.
- Allan Quartermain, 71, Australian footballer.

=== 14 ===
- Larry Drake, 64, American baseball player.
- Debaprasad Ghosh, 91, Indian politician and mathematician.
- Blake Huffman, 83, Canadian politician, MP (1949–1958).
- Lily May Ledford, 68, American folk musician.
- Dikki Madhava Rao, 66, Indian actor.
- Theo Schoon, 69, Dutch-born New Zealand photographer and artist.
- Lluís Solé, 77, Spanish geographer.
- Henk van Tilburg, 86, Dutch footballer.
- William White, 64, American film producer and actor.

=== 15 ===
- Frank S. Besson Jr., 75, American general, cancer.
- Diego Giacometti, 82, Swiss-French artist.
- Pearl Kibre, 84, American historian.
- Jean-Louis Marnat, 49, French racing driver, traffic collision.
- Federico Norcia, 81, Italian chess player.
- M. Blaine Peterson, 79, American politician, member of the U.S. House of Representatives (1961–1963).
- Earl D Thomas, 87, American civic leader.

=== 16 ===
- Walter Aveyard, 67, English footballer.
- Heinrich Böll, 67, German novelist, Nobel Prize recipient (1972).
- Clive Braybrook, 83, Australian cricketer.
- Elie Grekoff, 70, Russian-born French artist.
- Ursula Kathleen Hicks, 88, Irish-born British economist.
- Wayne King, 84, American songwriter and bandleader.
- Robert Siohan, 91, French composer.
- Kurt von Fritz, 84, German philologist.
- Elsie Wagstaff, 86, English actress.
- George H. Wilson, 79, American politician and jurist, member of the U.S. House of Representatives (1949–1951).

=== 17 ===
- Leslie C. Arends, 89, American politician, member of the U.S. House of Representatives (1935–1974), heart attack.
- Donald Davidson, 80, South African cricketer.
- Philippe de Chérisey, 62, French writer and humorist.
- Hugh Dunbar, 82, Australian footballer.
- Susanne Langer, 89, American philosopher.
- Margo, 68, Mexican actress, brain cancer.
- Arnold Mitchell, 67, American social scientist.
- Edith Rogers, 90, Canadian politician.
- Wynn Stewart, 51, American country singer, heart attack.
- Subho Tagore, 73, Indian painter, poet, and magazine editor.
- Abdul Hady Talukdar, 79-80, Bangladeshi academic administrator.

=== 18 ===
- Shahnawaz Bhutto, 26, Pakistani political activist.
- Louisa Ghijs, 83, Belgian actress.
- Bob Hoffman, 86, American sports promoter.
- Princess Isabel Alfonsa of Bourbon-Two Sicilies, 80, Spanish royal.
- Robert Raglan, 76, British actor (Dad's Army).
- Vicente Saldivar, 42, Mexican professional wrestler, cancer.
- Henry C. Segal, 84, American journalist.
- Tommy L. Smith, 71, Australian footballer.
- David Theander, 93, Swedish Olympic swimmer (1912).
- José María Vélaz, 74, Chilean-born Venezuelan Jesuit priest.

=== 19 ===
- Zygmunt Adamczyk, 62, Polish footballer.
- Mathew Anden, 42, German-born American actor, stomach cancer.
- Rolland Busch, 64, Australian theologian.
- John Canaday, 78, American art historian and critic, pancreatic cancer.
- Kher Jagatsingh, 53, Mauritian politician.
- Ted Johnson, 61, New Zealand Olympic rower (1952).
- Richard C. Meyer, 65, German-American film editor.
- Henry Mollison, 80, British actor.
- Ewen Montagu, 84, British jurist and naval intelligence officer (Operation Mincemeat).
- Leonida Repaci, 87, Italian writer.
- Sjumandjaja, 51, Indonesian filmmaker and actor.
- Janusz Zajdel, 46, Polish science fiction author, lung cancer.

=== 20 ===
- Leo Alexander, 79, Austrian-American neurologist and medical advisor, cancer.
- Fritz Bultman, 66, American artist.
- Bruno de Finetti, 79, Italian statistician.
- Estelle Evans, 78, American actress (To Kill a Mockingbird, The Learning Tree).
- Peter Glob, 74, Danish archaeologist.
- Egon Johnsson, 58, Swedish footballer.
- Maki Skosana, 24, South African factory worker, burned.
- Athos Valsecchi, 65, Italian politician.
- John J. Wicker Jr., 91, American politician, member of the Virginia Senate (1932–1936).
- Mahmud Ali al-Banna, 58, Egyptian Quran reciter.

=== 21 ===
- Alvah Bessie, 81, American screenwriter, member of the "Hollywood Ten", heart attack.
- Pat Fletcher, 69, Canadian golfer.
- Jack Gaughan, 54, American illustrator.
- Victor Hammer, 83, American businessman.
- Arthur Klæbo, 76, Norwegian journalist.
- Charles L. Kuhn, 83, American art historian and museum curator.
- Zoran Radmilović, 52, Yugoslav actor.
- Keith Simpson, 78, English forensic pathologist.
- Ulla-Britt Söderlund, 41, Swedish costume designer, cancer.
- Johnny Tomaini, 83, American football player.
- Vicki Vola, 68, American actress.
- Aristid von Grosse, 80, German-American nuclear chemist.
- Dorian Williams, 71, British equestrian, pancreatic cancer.
- Lawrence Woolner, 73, American film producer.

=== 22 ===
- Mahua Roy Choudhury, 26, Indian actress, injuries sustained in a fire.
- Ramadevi Choudhury, 85, Indian social reformist and independence activist.
- J. Edward Hutchinson, 70, American politician, member of the U.S. House of Representatives (1963–1977).
- Matti Järvinen, 76, Finnish Olympic javelin thrower (1932).
- Trevor Jones, 67, Australian footballer.
- Liminha, 55, Brazilian footballer, pneumonia.
- William L. Pfeiffer, 78, American politician, member of the U.S. House of Representatives (1949–1951).
- Paul Pleiger, 85, German economist and businessman.
- Sir Peter Roberts, 3rd Baronet, 73, British politician, MP (1945–1966).
- Jaap Spaanderman, 88, Dutch pianist and cellist.
- Tauno Suoniemi, 57, Finnish Olympic weightlifter (1952).
- Julian Stanley Wise, 85, American volunteer rescuer.

=== 23 ===
- Lloyd R. Baumgart, 77, American politician, member of the Wisconsin State Assembly (1957–1964).
- Fred Birrell, 71, Australian politician, MP (1963–1974).
- Roy Emery Dunn, 99, American politician.
- Alphonse Feyder, 69, Luxembourgish footballer.
- Kay Kyser, 80, American bandleader.
- Mickey Shaughnessy, 64, American actor and comedian, heart failure.
- Rose Smith, 94, British union organizer.
- Stan Turner, 71, English-born Canadian RAF officer.
- Tom Waldman, 63, American screenwriter.
- Johnny Wardle, 62, English cricketer.

=== 24 ===
- José Bódalo, 69, Spanish actor.
- Hubert John Collar, 85, Hong Kong businessman.
- Aftab Uddin Chowdhury, 73, Bangladeshi politician, MP (1979–1984).
- Les Gaunt, 67, English footballer.
- William Hall, 2nd Viscount Hall, 72, Welsh businessman and hereditary peer.
- Philip Kelly, 83, Canadian politician.
- Ted Kleinhans, 86, American baseball player.
- Alice D. G. Miller, 91, American screenwriter.
- Ezechiele Ramin, 32, Italian missionary, shot.
- László Salgó, 75, Hungarian politician and rabbi.
- Ganesh Lal Shrestha, 73-74, Nepalese musician and poet.
- Peter Tamony, 82, American etymologist.
- Frances Winwar, 85, Italian-born American writer.
- Donald O. Wright, 92, American politician, lieutenant governor of Minnesota (1954–1955).

=== 25 ===
- Bhudo Advani, 79, Indian actor.
- Silvio Alverà, 63, Italian Olympic alpine skier (1948, 1952).
- Božo Broketa, 62, Yugoslav footballer.
- Hamlet Gonashvili, 57, Soviet Georgian singer.
- Hoover, c. 14, American harbor seal known to mimic human speech.
- Walter Hussey, 76, English Anglican priest and art patron.
- Stephen Knight, 33, British author.
- Curly Linton, 89, Australian footballer.
- Aleksey Malchevskiy, 69, Soviet ornithologist.
- Piano Red, 73, American blues musician.
- Karel Shook, 64, American ballet dancer and choreographer.

=== 26 ===
- Grace Albee, 94, American wood engraver.
- K. J. Callahan, 88, American jurist and politician, member of the Wisconsin State Assembly (1931–1935).
- J. D. Grey, 78, American pastor.
- Marcus Hines, 65, Australian footballer.
- Harold Lang, 64, American dancer and actor, pancreatic cancer.
- Ann May, 86, American actress.
- Roger Monclin, 82, French militant pacifist and writer.
- Fredy Perlman, 50, Czechoslovak-born American author, complications from heart surgery.
- Walter Richter, 80, German actor.
- Sir Oliver Simmonds, 87, British politician, MP (1931–1945).
- Jindřich Uher, 74, Czechoslovak politician.
- Camiel Van de Velde, 82, Belgian Olympic runner (1924).

=== 27 ===
- Shigeru Amachi, 54, Japanese actor.
- Michel Audiard, 65, French film director.
- John L. Ayers, 83, American politician, member of the Florida House of Representatives (1957–1966).
- Elizabeth Cleaver, 46, Canadian children's author.
- Joe Crozier, 70, Scottish footballer.
- Antun Fischer, 74, Yugoslav Serbian Olympic wrestler (1936).
- Frederick Stanley Gordon, 87, New Zealand flying ace.
- Henry Hay, 75, American journalist and translator.
- Adelheid Kofler, 96, Austrian inventor and mineralogist.
- Jules Patient, 80, French Guianese politician.
- Louise Roy, 61, Canadian singer.
- Smoky Joe Wood, 95, American baseball player.
- Carl Yowell, 82, American baseball player.

=== 28 ===
- Israel Breslow, 79, Russian-born American union manager.
- Masoud Monfared Niyaki, 55, Iranian general.
- Tommy Priestley, 74, Northern Irish footballer.
- Anna Klindt Sørensen, 85, Danish painter.
- Grant Williams, 53, American actor (The Incredible Shrinking Man, Hawaiian Eye), sepsis.
- Zhou Chunquan, 79, Chinese general.

=== 29 ===
- Martha-Bryan Allen, 82, American actress.
- Petar Čule, 87, Yugoslav Bosnian Roman Catholic prelate.
- Izaak Huru Doko, 71, Indonesian politician.
- Eric Glass, 75, Australian footballer.
- Vlastimil Hála, 61, Czechoslovak jazz trumpeter.
- Paul Mondoloni, 68, French mobster, shot.
- James Nolan, 69, American actor, cancer.
- Petr Sepeši, 25, Czechoslovak singer, traffic collision.
- Judah Waten, 74, Russian-born Australian novelist.

=== 30 ===
- Cvetka Ahlin, 57, Slovenian singer.
- Frederick Arthur Dewhurst, 74, Canadian politician.
- Carol Eckman, 47, American basketball coach.
- Ibrahim Geagea, 61, Lebanese Olympic alpine skier (1952, 1956, 1960).
- Iosif Gikhman, 67, Soviet mathematician.
- Peter Knight, 68, English composer.
- André Obrecht, 85, French executioner.
- Julia Robinson, 65, American mathematician, leukemia.
- Robert Sénéchal, 93, French racing driver and car manufacturer.
- Myrl Shoemaker, 72, American politician, lieutenant governor of Ohio (since 1983), member of the Ohio House of Representatives (1967–1982), cancer.

=== 31 ===
- Ruth Morris Bakwin, 87, American pediatrician.
- Eugene Carson Blake, 78, American Presbyterian church leader.
- Stella Blum, 68, American fashion historian, cancer.
- Murray Chapple, 55, New Zealand cricketer.
- Arkady Chepelev, 70, Soviet soldier.
- Reginald Fulljames, 88, English cricketer.
- Jeff Glick, 78, American bridge player.
- Ed Kolman, 69, American football player.
- Germaine Krull, 87, German photographer.
- Walter Kuusela, 81, Finnish politician.
- Dick Vance, 69, American jazz trumpeter.
