= Feyder =

Feyder is a surname. Notable people with the surname include:

- Alphonse Feyder (1916–1985), Luxembourgish footballer
- Jacques Feyder (1885–1948), Belgian actor, screenwriter, and film director
- Otto Feyder (1877–1961), American gymnast
- Patrick Feyder (born 1971), Luxembourgish footballer
- Vera Feyder (born 1939), Belgian writer
