= Iveta (miniseries) =

- Genre: Drama
- Directed by: Michal Samir
- Starring: Anna Fialová
- Country of origin: Czech Republic
- Original language: Czech
- No. of seasons: 3
- No. of episodes: 9

Production
- Running time: 60 minutes

Original release
- Network: Voyo
- Release: May 6, 2022 – May 24, 2024

Iveta is a 2022 Czech biographical miniseries. It is based on life of Czech singer, actress and celebrity Iveta Bartošová. It was directed by director Michal Samir, who also wrote the screenplay.

== Plot ==
=== Season 1 ===
Iveta is a girl from Frenštát pod Radhoštěm who wants to be a famous singer. Such path leads her from a children's choir through singing competitions where she records her first hit and album which gives her national fame. Series shows her first singing steps in the local choir, thanks to which the local choirmaster recommends her to participate in the talent competition Young Song in Jihlava. Iveta has to convince parents, judges, producers, viewers. The only one who believes in her from the beginning is a singer Petr Sepeši. After moving to Prague, she records a mega hit song Knoflíky lásky. The two singers become a nation's beloved couple. However, Sepeši's tragic accident intervenes in the future of Iveta Bartošová.

=== Season 2 ===
Iveta is at the top. Her solo albums are sold by thousands while she wins popularity polls and gets the main role alongside a generational idol in a movie Vampire Wedding. She lives with a man whom everyone admires. Her dream of a duet with Karel Gott comes true. Yet she lacks what she desires most of all: unconditional love, a child and a family. And here comes her first scandal.

=== Season 3 ===
Thirteen years after leaving Ladislav Štaidl, Iveta's life and career have changed beyond recognition. Alcohol, antidepressants and the daily interest of the tabloid media take away her hopes. It seems that sold-out halls and successful records are a thing of the past, but Iveta is not going to give up. She is convinced that true love is still waiting for her. And above all, she has someone who will never leave her side - her teenage son Artur.

== Cast and characters ==
- Anna Fialová as Iveta Bartošová
- Vojtěch Vodochodský as Petr Sepéši
- Ondřej Gregor Brzobohatý as Ladislav Štaidl
- Eliška Křenková as Ivana Bartošová
- Miroslav Hanuš as Karel Bartoš
- Alena Mihulová as Svatava Bartošová
- Ondřej Ruml as Karel Gott
- Saša Rašilov as Karel Svoboda
- Rudolf Hrušínský as actor Rudolf
- Igor Chmela as producer Vlasta Krejza
- Jan Vondráček as Kraus
- Jana Boušková as Štěpničková
- Robert Mikluš as professor Evžen Dubecký
- Marta Dancingerová as Věra
- Mia Petráňová as Iveta Bartošová (10 year old)
- Terezie Holá as Ivana Bartošová (10 year old)
- Ivan Shvedoff as Ivan Karevaev
- Miroslav Hruška as Pavel Fojtek
- Daniel Kadlec as Karel Bláha
- Patricie Pagáčová as Anežka Bláhová
- David Prachar as Josef Rychtar

== Production ==
The series was filmed under the brand Voyo Original and was published on the Voyo platform. After The Roubal Case, Guru and Národní házená, this is the fourth series filmed under the banner Voyo Original. Anna Fialová, Vojtěch Vodochodský, Ondřej Gregor Brzobohatý, Eliška Křenková, Miroslav Hanuš, Alena Mihulová, Igor Chmela and Jan Vondráček appeared in the main roles of the series.

== Episodes ==
Season one consisting three episodes were published on Voyo one week apart from 6 to 20 May 2022. After the airing of the three episodes, which were originally intended to form a three-part miniseries, a second season was announced. It is set in 1990s. The second season started filming on 6 October 2022 until 13 November 2022, when it was finished.

Season two consisting three episodes started broadcast on 5 May 2023. Other episodes are set for broadcast on 12 and 19 May 2023. It was renewed for third season in April 2023. Third season was announced to be the last and started shooting in August 2023.

=== Season 1: Málo mě zná (Little You Know Me) ===
Episode	Title	Directed by	Written by	Original air date (Voyo)	Original air date (Nova)	Czech viewers (millions)
1	Tisíc obyčejných věcí	Michal Samir	Michal Samir	6 May 2022	31 March 2024	0.999
2	Knoflíky lásky	Michal Samir	Michal Samir	13 May 2022	7 April 2024	0.915
3	Snad nám to vyjde	Michal Samir	Michal Samir	20 May 2022	14 April 2024	0.924

=== Season 2: Láska má je zákon (My Love is a Law) ===
Episode	Title	Directed by	Written by	Original air date (Voyo)	Original air date (Nova)	Czech viewers (millions)
1	Smím dál	Michal Samir	Michal Samir	5 May 2023	21 April 2024	1.025
2	Já se vrátím	Michal Samir	Michal Samir	12 May 2023	28 April 2024	0.786
3	Na tom záleží	Michal Samir	Michal Samir	19 May 2023	5 May 2024	0.792

=== Season 3: Navždy tvá (Forever Yours) ===
Episode	Title	Directed by	Written by	Original air date (Voyo)	Original air date (Nova)	Czech viewers (millions)
1	Lásko, lásko	Michal Samir	Michal Samir	10 May 2024	TBA	TBA
2	Léto	Michal Samir	Michal Samir	17 May 2024	TBA	TBA
3	Tichá píseň	Michal Samir	Michal Samir	24 May 2024	TBA	TBA
