= Iveta Bartošová =

Czech singer and actress (1966–2014)

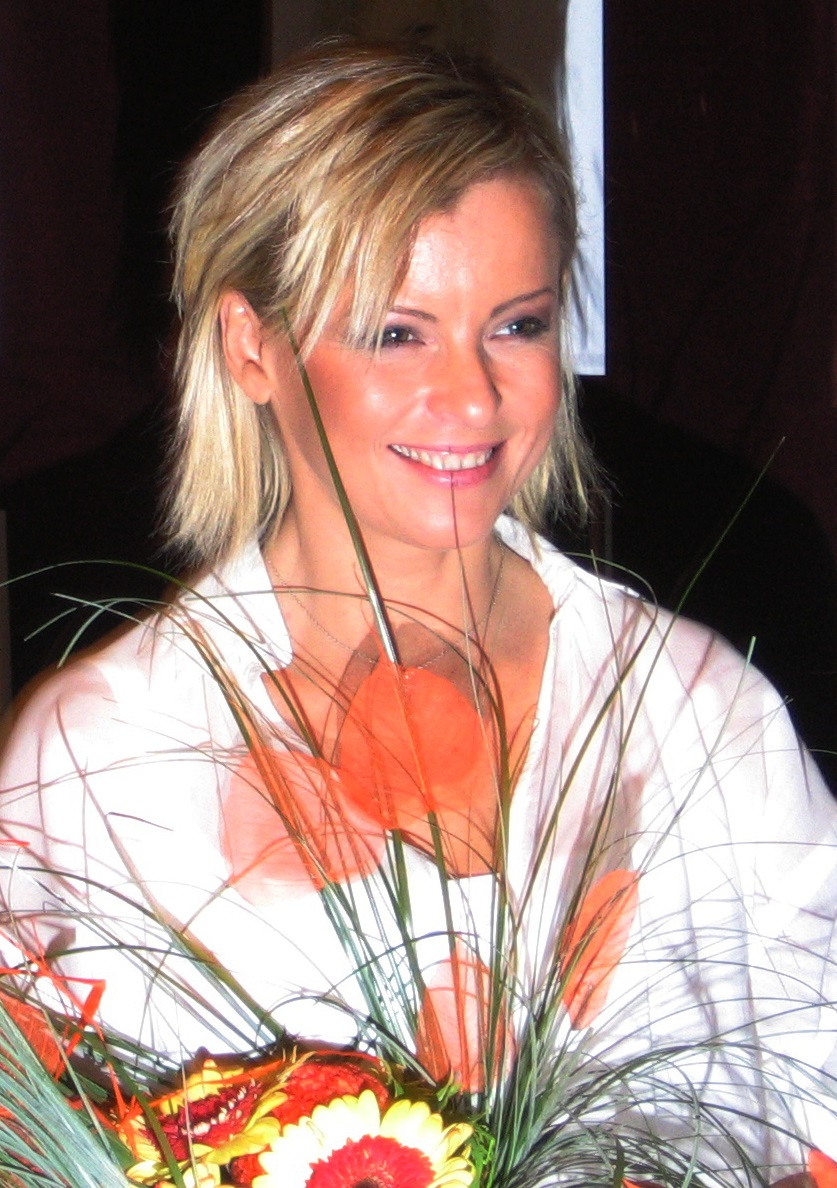
- Bartošová in 2008

Background information
- Born: 8 April 1966; Čeladná, Czechoslovakia
- Died: 29 April 2014 (aged 48) Uhříněves-Prague 22, Czech Republic
- Genre: Pop
- Occupations: Singer, actress and celebrity
- Instrument: Vocals
- Years active: 1982–2014

Iveta Bartošová (8 April 1966 – 29 April 2014) was a Czech singer, actress and celebrity, three-time best female vocalist in the music poll Zlatý slavík (1986, 1990 and 1991). She was also known for her turbulent lifestyle attracting the attention of the Czech tabloid media.

== Biography and career ==
Bartošová was born in Čeladná and spent her childhood and adolescence in Frenštát pod Radhoštěm. She has an older brother Lumír and twin sister Ivana. She started her musical career in 1982, with the band Dianthus. In 1983, she succeeded in a music competition held in Jihlava and met the singer Petr Sepéši, with whom she later collaborated and started a relationship. Sepéši died in a car accident in 1985.

In the second half of the 1980s, she began collaborating with notable exponents of Czech pop music, such as František Janeček and Ladislav Štaidl, her life partner for many years. In 1987, she released her first solo album I.B., for which she received an award from her record label, Supraphon.

In 1993, she starred in the comedy Svatba upírů. In 1996, she gave birth to a son. A year later, she appeared in her first musical production, Dracula. In the late 1990s, she released several successful albums, such as Ve jménu lásky and Bílý kámen. With the start of the new millennium, her popularity decreased, partly due to scandals surrounding her personal life. In 2006, she announced a 'creative break'. She spent part of 2007 in a psychiatric hospital in Kroměříž, where she was treated for addiction to antidepressants and alcohol.

In 2008, EMI released a 3–CD compilation of her greatest hits, called Platinum Collection. In 2009, she won the TV poll in the TýTý Awards. Since October 2012, she appeared in a reality show about her life, broadcast by the tabloid TV channel Pětka. She was hospitalized again in 2013, in Bohnice Psychiatric Hospital, in association with alcohol dependence.

From 2008 to 2009, she was married to the actor and film producer Jiří Pomeje, her second husband was Josef Rychtář (from 2013 to her death in 2014). She had one son, Artur, from her relationship with Ladislav Štaidl.

== Death ==
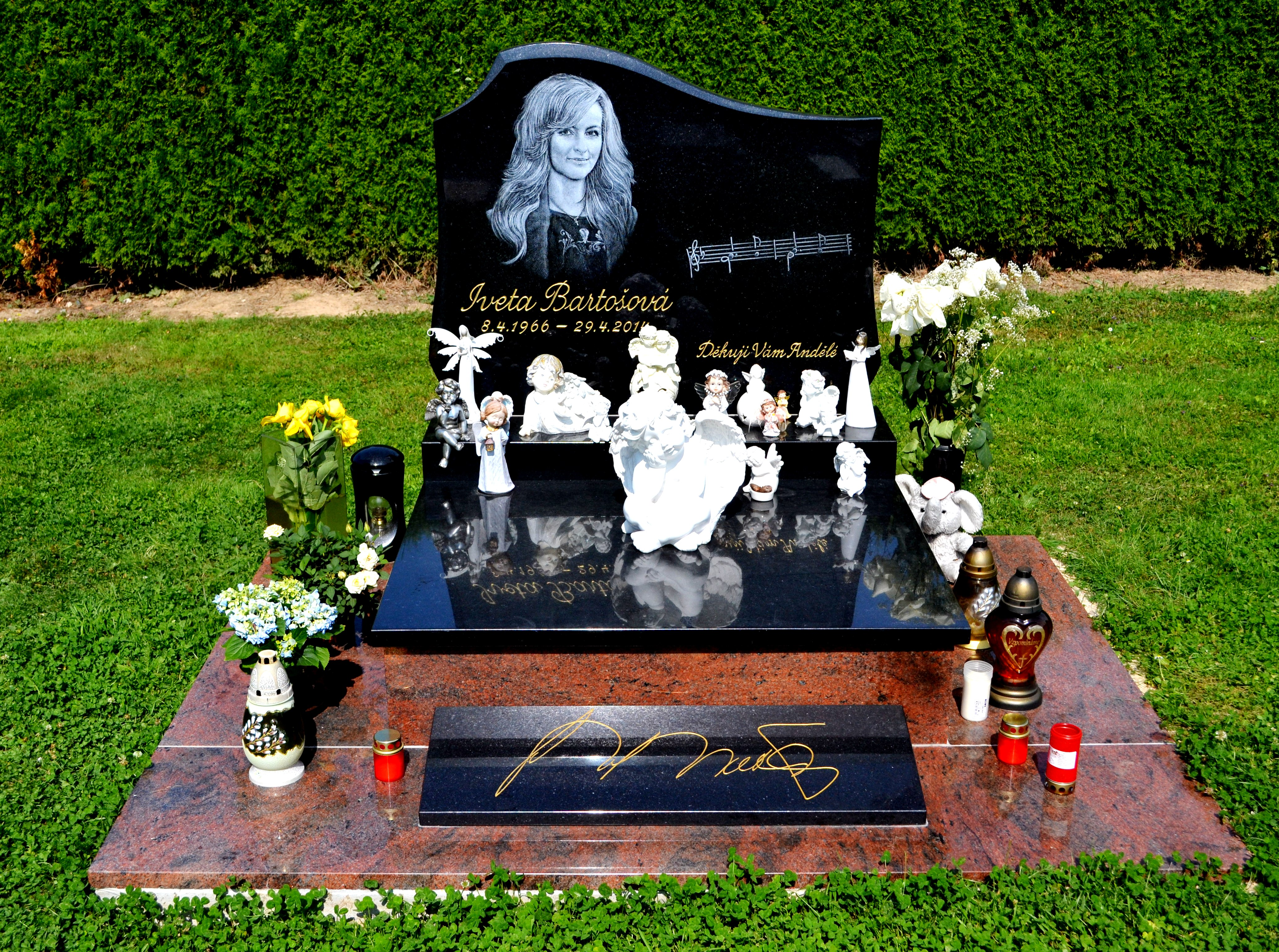
Gravestone of Iveta Bartošová at Říčany Cemetery near Prague

On 29 April 2014, she took her own life by throwing herself under a train in Uhříněves, Prague. Some fellow musicians pointed out that the hunt of the tabloid media against the singer had its share of tragedy. "Blame it on the media hyenas", her husband commented shortly before he collapsed and was hospitalized.

== Bartošová and the tabloid media ==
Iveta Bartošová was one of the most-discussed personalities in the Czech tabloid media. According to the musical producer Oldřich Lichtenberg, she "has become a victim of people who surrounded her and only try to profit from her". On the other hand, the psychologist Jeroným Klimeš pointed out in the Slovak newspaper SME that Bartošová knowingly and voluntarily participated in the media circus concerning her personal life. "She plays the story with all of us, however, she doesn't have the performance under control", he said. In the article Milý národe, Iveta Bartošová není věc (Dear Nation, Iveta Bartošová Is Not a Thing), published by the newspaper Lidové noviny, journalist Tomáš Baldýnský noted that the Czech tabloid media changes a human being into a human 'thing' and compared the public attention to the Bartošová troubles to a vulture watching her dying with a grin. In 2013 Pavel Novotný, the chief editor of the website Extra.cz and a well known tabloid journalist, remarked "Of course, we will kill her. But she's killing herself as well ... It is a fact that we've parasitized her for years ...". Novotný stated that the public demand is so huge that even the people who don't read tabloids search and read articles about her: "In such a case, there are no borders and we will parasitize her until the end and even half a year after that. It's hard and morally wrong but that's how it is." In July 2013, when she was hospitalized, 745,000 people (7% of the Czech population) watched the "Night News" special about her.

== Discography ==
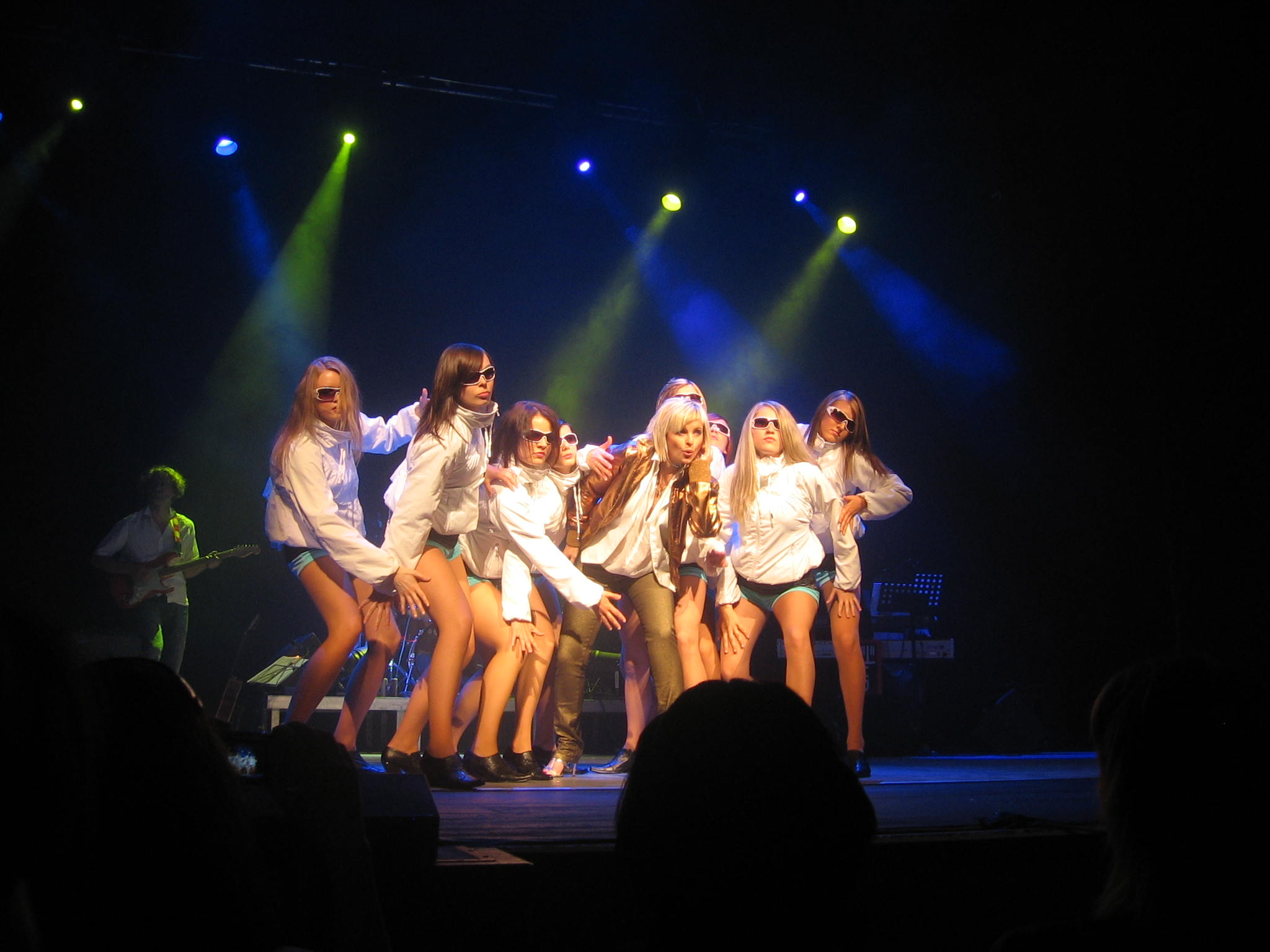
Bartošová (center) during a concert in 2008

Studio albums

- 1987: I.B.
- 1989: Blízko nás
- 1991: Natur
- 1992: Václavák
- 1993: Tobě
- 1994: Malé bílé cosi
- 1996: Čekám svůj den
- 1998: Ve jménu lásky
- 1999: Bílý kámen
- 2000: Jedna jediná
- 2003: Dráhy hvězd - All Stars Disco
- 2008: 22
- 2021: Knoflíky Lásky - Největší Hity 1984-2012

== Portrayal in film and television ==
In May 2022 a three-part series named Iveta premiered on Voyo.cz platform. The series about the beginnings of the career of one of the most talented Czech singers Iveta Bartošová was filmed by director Michal Samir. Iveta is portrayed by Anna Fialová, Petr Sepéši is portrayed by Vojtěch Vodochodský.

On 8 April 2024 a three-part documentary Málo mě znáš (translated to english "you don't know me well") premiered on Voyo.cz platform, directed by Tomáš Klein. The documentary describes Iveta's personal life and career from the 80's.
