= Ángel Barja =

Spanish composer (1938–1987)

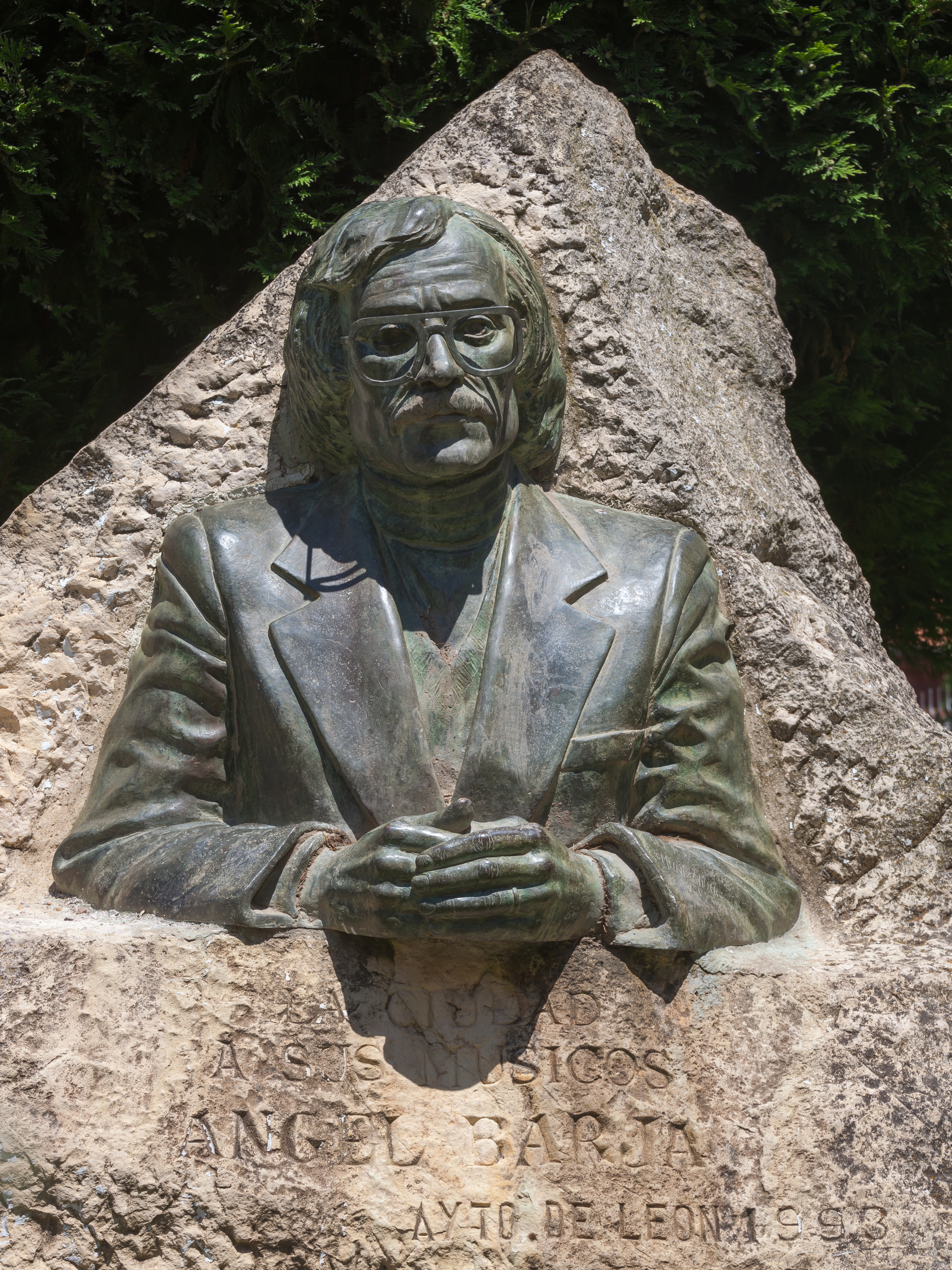
Sculpture of Ángel Barja in León, Spain.

Ángel Barja Iglesias (5 October 1938, Terroso, Vilardevós, Spain – León, 12 February 1987) was a Spanish composer.

Chronologically, Ángel Barja belongs to the generation that followed the so-called Generation of '51, represented by composers such as Luis de Pablo, Carmelo Bernaola, Ramón Barce, Xavier Benguerel, Cristóbal Halffter, and Tomás Marco.

According to composer José Luis Turina, Spanish composers born around 1930 emerged around 1951 as a unified group characterized by a high degree of aesthetic cohesion and a groundbreaking approach. However, those born during the following two decades developed a much wider range of currents and trends.

Ángel Barja's career can be situated within this generational context, as his work incorporates influences and compositional procedures ranging from traditional styles to the most innovative avant-garde movements, all within a highly individual and distinctive musical language.

== Biography ==
=== Early life and education ===
Barja began his musical education in 1950 at the Redemptorist school of El Espino (Burgos), where he studied solfège, piano, and harmony. At the age of fifteen he composed his first choral work, Campanas de Bastabales, a setting of a poem by Rosalía de Castro for four-part choir and bass solo.

In 1956, he entered the Redemptorist novitiate at Nava del Rey (Valladolid), professing his religious vows the following year. He continued his studies at the Redemptorist College in Valladolid with the composer José María Goicoechea and the pianist Pablo San José, and deepened his knowledge of music history, aesthetics and musical performance, from Gregorian chant to the avant-garde movements of the 20th century. During this period, he composed the stage work El rey de los hunos, for choir and several instruments

In 1961 he received a diploma as Master of Gregorian Chant in Madrid.

Between 1965 and 1966 Barja taught at the Redemptorist school of El Escorial, where he also directed school choirs while continuing to compose. His works from this period include Canciones para cello y piano, several piano pieces that would later become part of the collection Álbum de juventud, as well as organ works such as Tema y variación and Meditación.

=== The Italian years ===
In 1967, Barja moved to Italy to continue his musical education at the Pontifical Institute of Sacred Music in Rome. There he studied with Vieri Tosatti, Eugène Cardine, Higinio Anglés, Ferdinand Haberl and Domenico Bartolucci, among others. Alongside his studies, he was exposed to contemporary musical trends, concerts and avant-garde musicians, particularly through the Gruppo di Improvvisazione Nuova Consonanza. He also came into contact with composers such as Luciano Berio, Goffredo Petrassi, Sylvano Bussotti, Bruno Maderna, Luigi Nono, Mauricio Kagel, Pierre Boulez, and John Cage.

During these years in Italy, he travelled to Milan and Venice and also visited Austria, Switzerland, and Germany. In Vienna, he became particularly influenced by the work of Anton Webern. According to Enrique Franco, Barja took Webern as a model, yet from a perspective of a "free thinking and without aesthetic compromises."

Among the works from this period are Misa Ara Coeli, Canciones para orquesta de cuerda, Romance de la luna, luna, Tres piezas para orquesta, and Canon para violín y viola; chamber works such as the Cuarteto No. 1 in re mayor, 2 Madrigales para violín y viola, and numerous pieces for piano and organ.

=== Return to Spain ===
In 1971, the Redemptorist community sent Barja to León (Spain), where he resumed teaching at the Redemptorist School in Astorga. He became director of the Capilla Clásica, a choir founded in 1965, and also taught at the Music Conservatory. Living away from Spain's major musical centers might have limited his visibility and professional opportunities and contributed to his focus on choral music, a field that offered greater opportunities for performance within his local musical environment than his chamber or orchestral works.

However, his work began to receive recognition beyond the province through his success in numerous composition prizes. In 1972, he won the Second Prize in the International Organ Composition Competition of Ávila for Lamentatio temporis and the National Polyphonic Composition Prize for Madrigal.

During these years, he also composed Canciones Espirituales, a set of sacred songs; Madrigales y canciones, based on texts by poets from the Renaissance and the Spanish Golden Age; several works for piano, such as Suite for Piano, Divertimenti, Cantos de Esperanza, and Cuadernos de lectura a primera vista, a didactic collection; as well as Canticum for choir and chamber orchestra.

In 1975 Barja began a work compilation of folk music of the region, published in the collection Canciones del Reino de León, one of his main contributions to the region's musical heritage.

Some time later, he renounced his religious vows and married in 1978. That year he composed the music for the audiovisual documentary La Mancha, tierra de Don Quijote, based on a theme by Eusebio Goicoechea. The Capilla Clásica choir also participated in the recording of the album Maestros de Capilla de la Catedral de León, issued as part of the collection Monumentos Históricos de la Música Española.

=== Later career ===
From 1979 onwards Barja collaborated regularly with the Santander International Festival, taking part in concert series at the Sanctuary of Nuestra Señora de Bien Aparecida. At the 1980 festival he presented Movimientos para tres trompetas y órgano, while the British vocal ensemble The Scholars performed his Madrigales y romances and Poemas del mar.

In 1982 he composed Cantos de noche alta, a cycle of fifteen piano pieces as a tribute to the work of Federico Mompou. The following year, at the request of the Mompou Trio, he composed Trio, for violin, cello, and piano. He also completed the String Quartet No. 4: Fluencias, which was premiered at the Santander Festival by the Coull String Quartet.

=== Final years ===
In 1984, the city of León honoured Barja at a tribute concert featuring the Coull String Quartet, the Coral Salvé de Laredo, and the music critic Enrique Franco. He was also commissioned by the mezzo-soprano Teresa Berganza to compose an opera, but it could not be completed due to time constraints. At the time, Barja was engaged in several major compositions, including Planctum Jeremiae, commissioned by The Scholars. He also composed Pequeña Suite for two recorders and the Suite para un gentil órgano, and began work on a fifth string quartet that remained unfinished.

In 1985, he received a grant to collect traditional songs from the region. Barja initiated the project in collaboration with the folklorist Miguel Manzano, who completed the compilation on his own after Barja's death. Barja also wrote a series of newspaper articles on music criticism and dissemination for the cultural supplement El Filandón of the Diario de León.

In 1986 he won the City of Segorbe Composition Prize for Caro mea. His book Música y poesía para niños was published in January 1987, co-authored with Alfonso García.

After a long illness, Ángel Barja died in February 1987.

A collection of his autograph manuscripts is preserved in the Music Department of the National Library of Spain.

== Selected works ==
=== Choir ===
- Poemas del mar (1980) - on poems by Jesús Cancio
- Madrigales y romances (1980) - on poems by Rodrigo de Reinosa
- Madrigales italianos
- Madrigales y canciones – songs on classical poems
- Chez le petit prince - triptych on texts by A. de Saint-Exupéry
- Tríptico sobre Rafael Alberti
- Tríptico sobre Sem Tob
- Campanas de Bastabales (1954) – on poems by Rosalía de Castro
- Madrigal gallego (1980) - on a poem by Rosalía de Castro
- Manantial (1983) - on a poem by Lorca
- Pequeño madrigal (1972)
- Rima ("Melody for B", 1976) - on a poem by G. A. Bécquer
- Verdes riberas amenas (1978) - on a poem by Lope de Vega
- La princesa está triste (1967) - on a poem by Rubén Darío
- Planctum Jeremiae (1982)
- Cantiones Job (1981)
- Canciones espirituales (1973-74)
- Caro Mea (1986)
- Iam sol recedit
- O quantus luctus (motet, 1984)
- O sacrum convivium (1985)
- ¿Quem vidistis, pastores? (1970)
- Regina coeli (1962)
- Canción marinera (1959)

=== Folk arrangements for choir ===
- Folk and singer-songwriter songs
- Folk songs for 2, 3, 4 and 5 treble voices
- Canciones del Reino de León I

=== Voice and piano ===
- Canciones gallegas antiguas - arrangements of old Galician music for voice and piano
- Canciones para canto y piano (1967-72)
- Canciones de Navidad - for voice and piano
- Tríptico - on a text by Idea Vilariño
- Cuatro sonetos del amor oscuro (1985) - on melodies by Amancio Prada and poems by F.G. Lorca
- Canzone per un bambino malato (1969) - for voice and piano
- Fino cristal ("Canción de Navidad", 1968) - for choir / voice and piano / choir and piano / choir, piano and organ or two pianos

=== Voice and other instruments ===
- Canciones para canto y laúd - for voice and lute
- Quedito, pasito, amor (1965) - for choir / voice and piano / choir and piano / voice and lute / choir and instruments / instrumental
- Canciones teresianas - on texts by Santa Teresa de Jesús, for voice and organ
- Canción minera (1982) - on a poem by Alfonso García, for choir, trumpets, horns and percussion
- Cántico espiritual - music by Amancio Prada; arrangements by Á. Barja; text by San Juan de la Cruz; for voice, violin, cello and piano
- Música y poesía para niños - on poems from the 20th century, for voice, piano and various instruments
- Canciones del Reino de León II - folk music arrangements for choir and instrumental accompaniment
- Cuando llega la luz - collection of religious songs for choir, organ and various instruments

=== Choir and orchestra / Instrumental ensemble ===
- Avión de papel (1979) - on a poem by Alfonso García
- Cantata Emmaus (1971) - oratorio for solists, choir and orchestra
- Canticum (1969) - choral cantata on a text by San Francisco de Asís, for choir and organ / choir and string orchestra
- El rey de los hunos (1960) - stage music
- La Mancha, tierra de Don Quijote (1978) – full orchestral work on a theme by Eusebio Goicoechea
- Romance de la luna, luna (1967) - on a poem by Lorca, for voice and piano / choir and two pianos / choir, piano and orchestra
- Laudate Dominum (1969) - for two choirs, organ and string orchestra

=== Masses ===
- Misa Ara Coeli – for solos, choir, organ and orchestra
- Misa breve - for solos, choir and organ
- Misa para los jóvenes - for choir and various instruments
- Misa teresiana – for choir, congregation and organ
- Missa brevissima - for solo, choir and small orchestra
- Missa in honorem Sancti Martini legionensis - for solos, choir and organ
- Missa regalis (Kyrie only) - for solo and choir

=== Piano ===
- Álbum de juventud (1960-67)
- Cantos de esperanza (1975)
- Cantos de noche alta (1982)
- Canto en la noche (1970)
- Divertimenti (1971-73)
- Itinerantes (1969)
- Música para piano (1971)
- Suite para piano (1971)
- Temas para piano (1969)
- Canción en forma de rondó (1978)
- Canto en la vieja catedral (1969)
- Momento musical (1983)
- Canzonetta (I) (1966)
- Canzonetta (II) (1968)
- Gólgota (1966)
- Oración de la tarde (1969)
- Piccolo minuetto (1969)
- Piccolo pianto (1963)
- Contemplación (1968)
- Navidad '69 ("Plegaria", 1969)
- Vidalita (1961)
- ¡¡¡Valee!!! (1966)
- Lamento (1968)
- Valzer (1969)
- Cuadernos de lectura a primera vista (sight-reading books, 1973)

=== Organ ===
- Impression for Bach (1975)
- Lamentatio temporis (1972)
- Preludio, canción y fuga (1982)
- Retablo (1976)
- Fantasía para órgano (1971-2?)
- Canción triste (1982)
- Fuga y final (1969)
- Melodía (1955)
- Paradise lost I (¿1973-76?)
- Paradise lost?, II (¿1973-76?)
- Praeludium (1973)
- Lirio del valle (1962)
- Tema y variación (1961)
- Canzone per organo (1969)

=== Other solo instruments ===
- Piccolo concerto per oboe (1969)
- Vento del sud (1970) - for flute
- Piezas para guitarra (1966)

=== Chamber music ===
- String quartets:
  - Cuarteto nº 1 en re mayor (1969)
  - Cuarteto nº 2, Diálogos (1972)
  - Cuarteto nº 3, Contrapuntos joviales (1976)
  - Cuarteto nº 4, Fluencias (1982)
- La canción de la tarde (1955-68) - for piano and violin
- Madrigale per violino e violoncello (1969)
- Diálogos para violín y viola (1968)
- Canon para violín y viola (1969)
- Canciones para cello y piano (1965)
- Sonata para violín (o flauta) y guitarra (1983)
- Pequeña Suite (1984) - for two recorders
- Divertimento - for organ and two trumpets
- Madrigal para dos violines y viola (I) (1969)
- Madrigal para dos violines y viola (II) (1969)
- Suite infantil - for three violins
- Trío (1983) - for violin, cello y piano
- Concierto nº 7 ("Concierto para orquesta sietemesina", 1964)
- Movimientos para 3 trompetas y órgano (1980)
- Suite en forma de canciones (Preludio only) - for string quartet
- Quasi una ballata (1976) - for chamber group
- Tempo d'amor - for chamber group (1975)

=== Instrumental orchestra ===
- Suite para orquesta (1972)
- Canzone per archi - for string orchestra (1968)
- Movimientos para 3 trompetas y orquesta (1983, only movement I: Allegro moderato)
- Tres piezas para orquesta (1970)
- Canciones para orquesta de cuerda (1961-67)

== Discography ==
- Limones van por el río - IBS Classical, 2018. Héctor Guerrero, Miguel Bernal, Blanca Gómez.
- El piano de Ángel Barja - Esther Sánchez, 2007.
- Música de cámara - Caskabel, León, 2002.
- Belén Ordóñez Badiola - piano - Caskabel, León, 1994.
- Cuartetos - Caskabel, León 1993. Maggini Quartet, Coull String Quartet.
- Coral Salvé de Laredo - La poesía, la tradición - Caskabel, León, 1993. Conductor: José Luis Ocejo.
- Obras para órgano - Caskabel, León 1992. David Hoyland, José Manuel Azkue.
- Obras corales - Caskabel, León, 1992. Capilla Clásica de León. Conductor: Fernando García Pérez.
- La señora luna - RNE. Diputación de León. Madrid, 1991. Coral Valderense Coyantina. Conductor: Luis G. Viñuela.
- The Scholars - Caskabel, León, 1991.
- Ángel Barja - Commemorative set. Caskabel, León, 1989. National Recording Award, Ministry of Culture, 1989.
- Maestros de capilla de la Catedral de León - Ministry of Education and Science, Madrid, 1978. Monumentos Históricos de la Música Española. Capilla Clásica de León. Conductor: Ángel Barja. Camerata de Madrid. Conductor: Luis Remartínez.
- Vivo sin vivir en mí - Ediciones Paulinas, Madrid, 1981. Tribute to Sta. Teresa de Jesús.
- Antología Coral Salvé de Laredo - Columbia, Madrid, 1981. National Recording Award, Ministry of Culture, 1983.
- Coral Salvé de Laredo (Música montañesa I) - Columbia, Madrid,1978. Conductor: José Luis Ocejo.
- Coral Salvé de Laredo (Música pejina I) - Columbia, Madrid, 1977. Conductor: José Luis Ocejo.
- Canciones del Reino de León II - Columbia, Madrid, 1977. Capilla Clásica de León. Conductor: Ángel Barja.
- Canciones del Reino de León I - Columbia, Madrid, 1975. Capilla Clásica de León. Conductor: Ángel Barja.

== Awards and prizes ==
- 1972: International Organ Composition Competition of Ávila (Second prize) for Lamentatio temporis
- 1972: National Polyphonic Composition Prize for Madrigal
- 1976: International Organ Composition Prize of Ávila for Retablo
- 1981: International Polyphonic Composition Prize of Tolosa for Cantiones Job
- 1981: Rosalía de Castro Prize for Choral Music
- 1982: Cristóbal Halffter Composition Prize for Preludio, canción y fuga
- 1984: National Composition Prize of the City of Zamora
- 1984: San Vicente de la Barquera Choral Composition Prize
- 1985: International Composition Prize of Tolosa for Planctum Jeremiae
- 1985: International Prize of the Academy of Fine Arts of Granada for Impression for Bach
- 1986: City of Segorbe Composition Prize for Caro mea
