= Van Tilburg =

Van Tilburg is a Dutch toponymic surname meaning "from Tilburg". A number of variant spelling exist(ed), including Van Tilborch, Van Tilborg(h), Van Tilburch and Van Tilburgh. People with this name include:

- Gillis van Tilborgh (c.1625–c.1678), Flemish genre painter
- Henk van Tilburg (1898–1985), Dutch football goalkeeper
- Jacob Abraham van Tilburg (1888–1980), Dutch art collector who created the Van Tilburg Collection in Pretoria, South Africa
- Jo Anne Van Tilburg (born 1940s), American archaeologist
- Walter Van Tilburg Clark (1909–1971), American writer and educator
