= Thomas Priestley =

Thomas Priestley is the name of:

- Tommy Priestley, (1911-1985), Irish footballer
- Tom Priestley, English film editor
