= Earl Thomas (disambiguation) =

Earl Thomas (born 1989) is an American football safety.

Earl Thomas may refer to:

- Earl Thomas (basketball) (1915–1989), American basketball player
- Earl Thomas (wide receiver) (1948–2020), American football wide receiver
- Earl Thomas (musician) (born 1960), American blues and soul singer
- Earl D. Thomas (1897–1985), educator, civic leader, and councilman-at-large in Kansas City
- Earl Dennison Thomas (1847–1921), U.S. Army officer

== See also ==
- Earle Thomas, New Zealand international football (soccer) player
- Earlie Thomas (born 1945), American footballer
- Earl Thomas Conley (1941–2019), country music singer
