= Michal Samir =

Czech film director

Michal Samir (born November 14, 1985) is a Czech film director, screenwriter and producer. He made his directorial debut with the 2014 film, Hany. His most recent project is the television miniseries Iveta about Czech singer Iveta Bartošová.

== Career ==
He is a graduate of the directing course at Drama Centre London, a school noted for its methodological approach to performance and for producing a host of high-profile actors including Colin Firth, Tom Hardy, Paul Bettany and Emilia Clarke.

Following graduation in 2010, he collaborated as actor supervisor on Matěj Chlupáček's debut feature film, Bez doteku (Touchless), which premiered in 2013 to mixed reviews.

In 2014, another collaboration with Chlupáček resulted in Samir's debut feature, Hany, which received universal release in the Czech Republic, despite being made on a budget of only $240,000. The film was widely praised and cemented Samir as an impressive young upstart within Czech cinema. A massive success at international film festivals, Hany went on to win the Oldenburg IFF, Golden Eye IFF Grand Prix and Best Shot along with the Best Camera Award at Czech Film Critics Awards 2014 among others.

In 2015, Samir wrote the screenplay, Polednice (The Noonday Witch), which was picked up by both Barletta Production Company and HBO. As well as writing Polednice, Samir ultimately co-directed the finished film, which will premier in March 2016.

Based in London, Samir is Managing Director of Room One Films, a production company that specialises in feature films, commercials and TV content.

== Filmography ==
- Bez doteku (2013), actor, supervisor
- Hany (2014)
- Polednice (2016), writer
- To se vysvětlí, soudruzi! (2024), director
