= Order of the Flag of the People's Republic of Hungary =

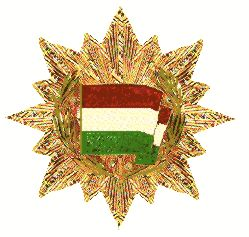
- Order of the Flag of the People's Republic of Hungary, 3rd Class
- Awarded for: Meritorious service to Hungary
- Presented by: the Hungarian People's Republic
- Eligibility: Civilians
- Established: 1956
- Final award: 1991
- Ribbon bar for 1st class Ribbon bar for 2nd class Ribbon bar for 3rd class Ribbons of the first, second and third classes of the Order.

The Order of the Flag of the People's Republic of Hungary (Hungarian: Magyar Népköztársaság Zászlórendje) was a State Order of the Hungarian People's Republic.

It was founded by Decree No. 17 of 1956 and then was abolished in 1991.

== Classes ==
The Order originally had five Classes, the 4th and 5th being abolished in 1963.

== Recipients ==
- Anatoly Alexandrov (physicist)
- Leonid Brezhnev
- Vladimir Dzhanibekov
- Anatoly Filipchenko
- Yuri Gagarin
- Gustáv Husák
- Henryk Jabłoński
- Yevgeny Nesterenko
- Nikolai Ogarkov
- Vitaly Popkov
- Konstantin Provalov
- László Salgó
- Pyotr Shafranov
- Vladimir Sudets
- Yumjaagiin Tsedenbal
- Dmitry Ustinov
- Boris Volynov
- Boris Yegorov
- Alexei Yepishev
- Haile Selassie
- Mohammad Reza Pahlavi

== Insignia ==
The Star of the Order was an 8-pointed gold star with shorter points between, and with the national flag at the centre surrounded by laurels. The classes of the Order were distinguished by the materials used in the laurels - gold with diamonds for the first class; gold with rubies for the second; gold for the third; green enamel for the fourth.

== Sources ==
- Orders, Medals and Decorations of Britain and Europe in Colour, Paul Hieronymussen, Blandford Press, 1967
