= The Scholars (vocal group) =

English a cappella group

The Scholars is an English a cappella group of four to five solo singers active 1968–2010, mainly in the field of classical music. In the United States they were also known as The Scholars of London and The Voices of London.

== Membership ==
Each of the five original members of The Scholars had been a Choral scholar in the Choir of King's College, Cambridge under David Willcocks between 1964 and 1968, and David Van Asch, the founder, organiser and bass of the group, had also been a boy chorister there under Boris Ord. After beginning as a male voice quintet (AATBarB), they had a middle phase (1972–82) as a mixed voice quintet (SATBarB) and latterly worked as an SATB quartet. Membership of The Scholars was nevertheless remarkably stable over its 40-year existence. The original members (1968) were Nigel Perrin (countertenor I) replacing the original counter tenor 1, Martin Lane, Timothy Brown (countertenor II), Robin Doveton (tenor), Stephen Varcoe (baritone) and David Van Asch (bass). After approximately three years Perrin, Brown and Varcoe left and were replaced, respectively, by Shelagh Molyneux (soprano), Nigel Dixon and Michael Leighton Jones. The latter was replaced in 1980 by Philip O'Reilly, and when he left in 1982 the group continued as an SATB quartet. In 1982 Paula Bott became The Scholars' soprano, followed by Kym Amps in 1988. In 1987 Angus Davidson replaced Dixon as countertenor and in 2004 Simon Grant took over from Van Asch as bass.

Whilst The Scholars no longer exists as such, ex-members remain active in other related musical fields, e.g. solo and ensemble singing, conducting, teaching and composing.

== Concerts ==
The Scholars' first public concert took place in Chelsea Town Hall in 1969 and they were subsequently signed by London agent Ibbs and Tillett who obtained numerous concerts for them all around the United Kingdom. A promotional European tour in 1972 sparked three decades of concert tours in over fifty countries. The Scholars sang in many of the world's premier concert venues: The Queen Elizabeth Hall, Purcell Room and St John's, Smith Square, London; The Opera Houses of Sydney and Buenos Aires; Alice Tully Hall, New York; Symphony Hall, Osaka; Auditorio Nacional, Madrid; Brahmsaal, Musikverein, Vienna to name but a few. On a number of occasions the British Council selected The Scholars to represent British musical culture, promoting tours in Iran, Kenya, Ghana, Cameroon, Malaysia, Indonesia and Thailand.

== Performance style ==
At the outset, being a male voice ensemble, The Scholars' ideals remained close to those cultivated by David Willcocks at King's College, Cambridge: accurate tuning, rhythmic precision, clarity of diction and neat coordination of consonants. With the addition of a soprano voice came the opportunity for a warmer, more soloistic style of singing. In the 1990s the requirements of Early Music prompted an adjustment of tuning ideals away from equal temperament towards just intonation. The Scholars possessed an outgoing stage presence and their spoken introductions, as well as being informative, were often of a humorous nature.

== Repertoire and programming ==
The promotion of English music and of the English singing tradition, were high on The Scholars' original priorities. Early programmes included English madrigals and sacred music of the 16th and early 17th centuries (Byrd, Tallis, Morley etc.). The lighter side of their repertoire with which they often concluded their concerts - spirituals and close harmony arrangements - initially continued to echo student days. Sets of five-voice folksong arrangements were made for The Scholars by David Willcocks (Five Folksongs), Gordon Langford (5 Sea Shanties) and John Rutter (5 Traditional Songs) which soon superseded the close harmony arrangements. From 1982, when The Scholars reduced to SATB, their place was in turn taken by Robin Doveton's four-voice folksong arrangements, although songs by The Beatles were still sung as encores. During the 1980s Italian, French, German and Spanish music of the Renaissance became standard repertoire and English glees of the late 18th and early 19th centuries were revived, including works by Arnold, Webbe and Callcott.

Contemporary music often formed part of The Scholars' programmes and included specially composed works by Philip Radcliffe (Cor Cordium), Malcolm Williamson (Death of Cuchulan), William Wordsworth (Adonais), John Rutter (It was a Lover and his Lass), John Joubert (Five Carols), William Mathias (Ceremony After A Fire Raid), Robert Walker (The Sun on the Celandines), Christopher Brown (Herrick Songs and From the Doorways of the Dawn) and Howard Blake (The New National Songbook and 'Lullaby - A Christmas Narrative' which includes the original version of Walking in the Air). The group forged strong connections with Spain and often sung works composed for them by Ángel Barja of León.

Non-specialist programmes were generally structured to include six groups of songs (three in each half of the concert), each themed by musical genre or subject matter, aiming for contrast of pace, humour/seriousness and key. Specialist programmes also became more and more in demand for Early Music festivals, and complete Mass settings by Josquin and Byrd often formed the basis of these.

== The Scholars Baroque Ensemble ==
In 1987 Van Asch founded The Scholars Baroque Ensemble, a small group of specialist baroque instrumentalists who would compliment the a capella work of The Scholars. They perform without a conductor, with The Scholars in performances and recordings of major works by Handel (Messiah, Acis and Galatea, Dixit Dominus), Bach (Johannes Passion, Motets), Purcell (The Fairy Queen, The Indian Queen) and Monteverdi (Vespers).

== Discography ==
A chronological list of recordings by The Scholars and The Scholars Baroque Ensemble.
Company, Catalogue no.	Year/Format	Title	Details
Unicorn UNS 254	1972/Vinyl	The Versatility of The Scholars I	English Renaissance music for AATBarB by Tallis (Lamentations), Byrd (motets) - Various (partsongs & madrigals). Engineer: Bob Auger
Unicorn RHS 318	1973/Vinyl	The Versatility of The Scholars II: Make we joy	Christmas music for SATBarB. Producer: Barry Rose Engineer: Bob Auger
Firecrest FEU 1002	1975/Vinyl. Reissued 1978 by Decca MOR-R-512	The Scholars sing the New National Songbook (reissue title: Sing a Song of Satire)	Words and Music by Howard Blake (Piano) Cover picture: Hugh Casson
Pilgrim Praise 2	1975/Vinyl	Christ in Competition	Eira Heath with The Scholars and the William Davies Quintet. Music by Edward Hughes, words by Peter Westmore.
Prelude PRS 2501	1976/Vinyl	The Scholars Sing	Madrigals - Victorian - Folk - Contemporary (Robert Walker: The Sun on the Celandines)
Enigma Classics VAR 1017	1976/Vinyl. Reissued in the USA.	Elizabethan and Jacobean Madrigals (USA title: The Silver Swan)	Producer: John Boyden.
Arion AR 31939	1978/Vinyl	L'AGE D'OR DE LA MUSIQUE SACREE EN ANGLETERRE	Lambe (Magnificat), Cornysh (Ave Maria Mater Dei), Tallis (Salvator mundi hodie), Whyte (Lamentations)
Arion ARN 38411	1979?/Vinyl	Adriano Banchieri: Festino	
L'OISEAU-LYRE (Decca) DSLO 33	1979/Vinyl	When Winds Breathe Soft: Glees from Georgian England	Producer: Peter Wadland
Accento ACR 101	?/Vinyl	The Chester Books of Madrigals	16th and early 17th century madrigals and partsongs (for 3-5 vv) from England, France, Germany, Italy and Spain. Producer: Mark Sutton.
Accento ACR 102	1985/Vinyl	Hispanae Musica Vocibus Vol. I	Sacred Music for 4-6 voices by Melchor Robledo. Producer: Mark Sutton.
Accento ACR 103	1986/Vinyl	Hispanae Musica Vocibus Vol. II	Sacred and Secular Music for 4-6 voices by Pedro Ruimonte. Producer: Mark Sutton.
Classic CD-102	1988/CD	Angel Barja (composer)	Planctum Jeremiae, Madrigales y Romances, Poemas del Mar
Accento ACD 104	1989/CD	British Folksongs	SATB arrangements by Robin Doveton
Toshiba-EMI/Eastworld CC38-3076	1983/CD and Vinyl (recorded May 1981)	Greensleeves The Scholars/English Folk Songs	Arrangements for 5 voices (SATBarB) by Robin Doveton, John Rutter, Gordon Langford (Sea Shanties) et al. A landmark very early digitally recorded CD made before editing became practicable. Each song was recorded complete as a single take.
Toshiba-EMI/Eastworld CC33-3323	1984/CD and Vinyl (recorded in December 1983)	English & Italian Madrigals	SATB madrigals by Dowland, Morley, Farmer, Wilbye, Josquin, Arcadelt, Rore, De Wert, Marenzio et al.
Toshiba-EMI/Eastworld CC33-3466	1986/CD and Vinyl	Loch Lomond - The Scholars/English Folk Songs	SATB arrangements of English, Scottish, Welsh and Irish Folksongs by Robin Doveton
Toshiba-EMI/Eastworld CE20-5324/5	2 CD reissue of CC38-3076 and CC33-3466	Home, Sweet Home	The Scholars: British Folk Songs
Accento ACD 105	1990/CD	English Ayres and Madrigals	Byrd, Morley, Dowland, Wilbye, Weelkes, Tomkins et al.
Accento ACD 201	1991/CD Reissued in 2001 by Dorian as DOR-93227	G.F. Handel: Acis & Galatea	The Scholars Baroque Ensemble (live recording, Gijon 1991). The part of Damon adapted for countertenor by Andrew Lawrence-King
NAXOS 8.8550667-668	1992/CD (2)	Handel: (The) Messiah	The Scholars Baroque Ensemble
NAXOS 8.8550660-1	1993/CD (recorded 1992)	Purcell: The Fairy Queen	The Scholars Baroque Ensemble
NAXOS Early Music 8.550880	1993/CD	French Chansons	The Scholars of London (Josquin, Jannequin, Gombert, Arcadelt, Clemens, Lassus etc. for 4-5 vv)
NAXOS 8.550664-65	1994/CD (recorded April 1993)	J.S.Bach St John Passion (in German)	The Scholars Baroque Ensemble
Accento ACD 106	1993/CD	Breathe soft, ye winds	The Scholars: A collection of Classic Glees from Georgian England (Arnold, Cooke, Webbe, Stevens, Callcott etc. for 4-5 vv)
NAXOS Early Music 8.8550662-3	1995/CD (recorded September 1993)	Monteverdi: Vespers of the Blessed Virgin	The Scholars Baroque Ensemble
Toshiba-EMI/Eastworld TOCE-8880	1995/CD	World Famous Songs	The Scholars/Yukinobu Kuni (Piano). 21 Arrangements by Robin Doveton (4vv a cappella and accompanied)
Musica en la catedral de Pamplona 2	1996/CD	Musica en la catedral de Pamplona	The Scholars/Jeremy West/Terence Charlston/Capilla de Música de la Catedral de Pamplona
Accento ACD107	1996/CD	The Sound of The Scholars	Five Hundred Years of Song: Renaissance - Classical - Romantic - Folk
NAXOS 8.553108	1997/CD (recorded October 1994)	Purcell: Dido and Aeneas	The Scholars Baroque Ensemble
NAXOS 8.553188	1998/CD (recorded September 1993)	Handel: Acis and Galatea	The Scholars Baroque Ensemble
NAXOS 8.553752	1998/CD (recorded November 1995)	Purcell: The Indian Queen	The Scholars Baroque Ensemble
NAXOS 8.553823	1997/CD (recorded February 1996)	J.S. Bach Motets	The Scholars Baroque Ensemble
NAXOS 8.553208	1999/CD (recorded October 1994)	Handel: Dixit Dominus (also Salve Regina and Nisi Dominus)	The Scholars Baroque Ensemble
Accento ACD108	2001/CD	The Scholars of London: Five Hundred Years of Song	Songs of Praise - Singing and Dancing - The Animal Kingdom - The Seasons - The Power of Music - Songs of Love
