= SK Čechie Uhříněves =

Uhříněves
- Full name: SK Čechie Uhříněves, z.s.
- Founded: 1908
- Ground: Vachkova 787; Prague 10 – Uhříněves
- Chairman: Tomáš Kaněra
- Manager: Martin Svoboda
- League: Prague Championship
- 2025–2026: 15th
- Website: https://www.skuhrineves.cz/

SK Čechie Uhříněves is a football club located in Prague-Uhříněves, Czech Republic. It currently plays in the Prague Championship, which is in the fifth tier of the Czech football system. The club took part in the first round of the 2012–13 Czech Cup.

Club logo until 2017
