= To se vysvětlí, soudruzi! =

- Czech poster
- Genre: Comedy; Mystery
- Written by: Miro Šifra; Lucie Vaňková
- Directed by: Matěj Chlupáček; Michal Samir
- Starring: Jiří Macháček; Jan Cina; Anna Fialová; Leoš Noha
- Countries of origin: Czech Republic; Germany
- Original language: Czech
- No. of seasons: 1
- No. of episodes: 8

Production
- Producers: Matěj Chlupáček; Maja Hamplová; Bettina Wente; Jan Lekeš
- Cinematography: Martin Douba
- Running time: 57 minutes
- Production companies: Barletta; Network Movie

Original release
- Network: Czech Television; ZDF
- Release: March 3 – April 21, 2024

To se vysvětlí, soudruzi! (We’re On It, Comrades! ) is a mystery comedy television series coproduced by Czech Television and ZDF. The series aims to follow on from popular 1980s co-production projects of Czechoslovakia and West Germany Návštěvníci, Létající Čestmír or Arabela. Episode titles refer to comedy films by Václav Vorlíček and Jindřich Polák. The series draws inspiration from real events. Plot itself is inspired by real life Czechoslovak institute that focused on paranormal activity which existed in 1980s. Some media called the series "Czech The X-Files."

Director Matěj Chlupáček mentioned during interview in August 2023 that he would like to make a second season if the series is successful.

== Plot ==
The series follows members of the Institute of Paranormal Phenomena who solve various mysteries in 1980s communist Czechoslovakia. Skeptic investigator David and a naive scientist Vojta are solving cases that include an alien abduction, self-immolation of a saint in a church, or an attack by the creepy monster Kozlopír. They are followed by duo of StB agents - tough agent Snížková and her sensitive right-hand man Hora.

== Cast ==
- Jiří Macháček as David Zajíc
- Jan Cina as Vojta Bek
- Anna Fialová as StB agent Štěpánka Snížková
- Leoš Noha as StB agent Jaroslav Hora
- Darija Pavlovičová as Eva Zajícová
- Lenka Termerová as prof. Milada Winterová, CSc.
- Richard Stanke as Peter Čurko
- Michal Kern and Tomáš Kobr as Junovci
- Ján Jackuliak as Karel Pavlas
- Kampan Soni as Shushrut Kanchanmukh Balakrishnan
- Jana Plodková
- Norbert Lichý
- Eliška Křenková

== Episodes ==
Episode		Directed by	Written by	Original air date	Czech viewers (millions)
1	Ostře sledované UFO	Matěj Chlupáček	Miro Šifra, Lucie Vaňková	3 March 2024	0.935
2	Jak uškrtit mistra Šálka	Michal Samir	Miro Šifra, Lucie Vaňková, Marie Stará	10 March 2024	0.554
3	Copak je to za veksláka	Matěj Chlupáček	Miro Šifra	17 March 2024	0.487
4	Hoří, má babičko	Michal Samir	Lucie Vaňková	24 March 2024	0.467
5	Paní, vy jste vdova!	Matěj Chlupáček	Miro Šifra, Marie Stará	31 March 2024	0.368
6	Balada pro Kozlopíra	Michal Samir	Miro Šifra, Marie Stará	7 April 2024	0.439
7	Srdečné pozdravy z lázní	Matěj Chlupáček	Lucie Vaňková	14 April 2024	0.443
8	Lada Lazarová	Matěj Chlupáček, Michal Samir	Miro Šifra	21 April 2024	0.484

== Reception ==
To se vysvětlí, soudruzi! received negative reactions from audiences after broadcast of first two episodes which resulted in a large drop in viewers between episode 1 and 2. First episode was watched by 935,000 viewers but second was watched only by 554,000 people losing almost half of its audience.
