= Lluís Solé =

Spanish educator and geographer

Lluís Solé i Sabarís (May 18, 1908 - July 14, 1985) was a Spanish educator and geographer.

== Life ==
Born in the city of Gavà, Solé's family moved to Lleida when he was still young. In 1926, he met Pau Vila, through whom he discovered geography, and graduated from the University of Barcelona in Natural Sciences three years later. In 1935, he helped found the Catalan Society of Geography, of which he was president from 1972 to 1981.

Solé went on to study paleontology in Germany, and wrote about the subject for his doctorate in 1936.

Solé devoted his life to teaching, and after the Spanish Civil War, he became chair of Physical Geography at the University of Granada. In 1943, he became a faculty member of the University of Barcelona, where he was the Professor who led the department of Geography. Carmina Virgili was one of his assistants. He established the university's branch of the Center for Advanced Scientific Research (CSIC) and the Institute of the Pyrenees. In 1981, he was awarded the Creu de Sant Jordi by the Generalitat of Catalonia.

Solé died in 1985 at his residence in Capellades.
