= Desmond McMullen =

British flying ace of WWII

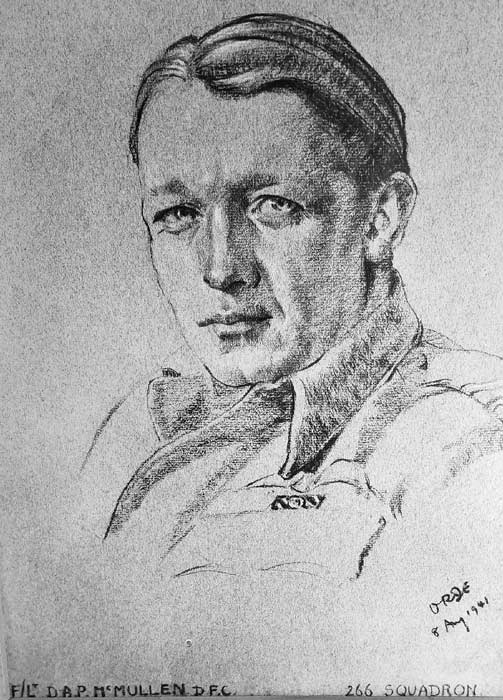
- Portrait of McMullen, made by Cuthbert Orde in August 1941
- Born: 6 December 1917; Godstone, Reigate, United Kingdom
- Died: 1 July 1985 (aged 67)
- Military career
- Allegiance: United Kingdom
- Branch: Royal Air Force
- Service years: 1937–1957
- Rank: Wing commander
- Commands: No. 324 Wing; No. 65 Squadron
- Conflicts: Second World War: Battle of France; Battle of Britain; The Blitz; Circus offensive; Dieppe Raid
- Awards: Distinguished Flying Cross & Two Bars

Desmond McMullen, DFC & Two Bars (6 December 1917 – 1 July 1985) was a British flying ace who served with the Royal Air Force (RAF) during the Second World War. He was credited with having shot down at least twenty-two aircraft.

Born in Godstone, Reigate, McMullen joined the RAF in 1937 and once he gained his wings, was posted to the staff of No. 1 Air Armament School as a pilot. After the outbreak of the Second World War, he was sent to No. 54 Squadron and flew in the later stages of the Battle of France, providing aerial cover for the evacuation of the British Expeditionary Force from Dunkirk. He flew extensively through the Battle of Britain, the final portion being spent with No. 222 Squadron and was awarded the Distinguished Flying Cross (DFC). He spent much of 1941 on night fighting duties, firstly with No. 151 Squadron and then No. 266 Squadron. He received Two Bars to his DFC during this time. After a period of service as an instructor, he flew in the RAF's Circus offensive before being given command of No. 65 Squadron. After two months in charge of the squadron, during which time he led it in the Dieppe Raid, before he was posted to North Africa to briefly lead No. 324 Wing. He spent most of the remainder of the war in training and staff roles. He remained in the RAF for the postwar period, retiring in 1957. He died in 1985, aged 67.

== Early life ==
Desmond Annesley Peter McMullen was born on 6 December 1917 in Godstone, near Reigate in the United Kingdom. He was a student at Cheltenham College and following the completion of his education, joined the Royal Air Force (RAF) in 1937 on a short service commission. He commenced training at the end of May before proceeding to No. 6 Flying Training School at Netheravon three and half months later, as acting pilot officer. After he gained his wings, he was posted to No. 1 Air Armament School at Manby in July 1938, where he served on the staff as a pilot.

== Second World War ==
Following the outbreak of the Second World War, McMullen was posted to No. 54 Squadron. This was based at Hornchurch, operating the Supermarine Spitfire fighter, and saw little action in the initial months of the conflict. From mid-May, the squadron began to operate over northern France to provide aerial cover for the retreat of the British Expeditionary Force following the German invasion of France and the Low Countries. By this time McMullen was a flying officer, having been promoted to this rank in March.

On 24 May, McMullen shot down a Messerschmitt Bf 109 fighter to the east of Calais, and shared with two other pilots in the destruction of a second. Neither was able to be confirmed as destroyed. The following day he claimed to have shot down a pair of Messerschmitt Bf 110 heavy fighters south of Gravelines, but again these could not be confirmed. His first confirmed aerial victory was on 27 May, flying over the Dunkirk region, when he destroyed a Bf 110. Two days later he combined with two other pilots to destroy a Dornier Do 17 medium bomber near Ostend.

=== Battle of Britain ===
After its intensive operations over France of late May, No. 54 Squadron was briefly based at Catterick before returning to Hornchurch the next month for the forthcoming Battle of Britain. On 4 July, McMullen damaged what was either a Bf 110 or Do 17 over Dover. The same day, while on a scramble to intercept bombers near Manston, his Spitfire was damaged during an engagement with Bf 109s although he was able to return safely to his airfield. His aircraft was damaged again by Bf 109s that engaged McMullen and two other pilots attempting to attack a Heinkel He 111 medium bomber, and this time he was wounded, on 7 July. He was able to land safely at Manston after the engagement.

By 24 July, McMullen was back on operations for on that day, he destroyed two Bf 109s over the Thames estuary, although only one was confirmed. On 15 August, near Dover, he damaged what he claimed as a Heinkel He 113 fighter and probably destroyed another over Maidstone. These were actually Bf 109s. He shot down a Bf 109 to the east of Hornchurch airfield the next day, again claiming it as a He 113. On 18 August, what is now known as The Hardest Day, he damaged a Bf 109 and a Do 17, and claimed a Bf 110 as probably destroyed. He shot down a Bf 109 near Dover on 24 August and destroyed another two days later over the English Channel. He shared in the destruction of a Do 17 over Billericay on 30 August and the next day, along with another pilot, probably destroyed a second Do 17 near Hornchurch.

McMullen shot down a Do 17 close to Hornchurch on 2 September, also claiming a Bf 109 as probably destroyed in the Chatham region the same day. He probably destroyed a Bf 110 the next day. Shortly afterwards, the fatigue of the intensive pace of the squadron's operations over the previous weeks saw it moved to the north for a rest. McMullen stayed in the south, being transferred to No. 222 Squadron. This was another Spitfire squadron based at Hornchurch. He continued his run of successes, destroying a Bf 109 over Calais on 14 September, following it up with a second the next day over Dungeness. He also damaged a Bf 110 in the same area. He was recognised for his successes in the fighting over England with an award of the Distinguished Flying Cross (DFC). The citation, published in The London Gazette, read:

Since the commencement of hostilities this officer has been continuously engaged on operational flights, including the Dunkirk operations, the protection of shipping and intensive air fighting over this country. He has destroyed seven enemy aircraft and shared in the destruction of others. He has displayed high qualities of leadership and determination.

— London Gazette, No. 34958, 1 October 1940

On 15 October, McMullen shared in the destruction of a Bf 109 over Maidstone. He shot down another near Hornchurch two days later. He combined with five other pilots to destroy a Bf 110 to the east of Tunbridge Wells on 20 October. Back over Maidstone, on 25 October, he destroyed a Bf 109 and damaged a second. Another Bf 109 was shot down by McMullen on 28 October, this time near Dungeness and he also damaged a Bf 109 in the vicinity as well. These were his final victories in the Battle of Britain, which officially ended at the end of the month. Despite this the Luftwaffe still made occasional forays into England and McMullen destroyed a Bf 109 off Beachy Head on 8 November.

=== Night-fighting duties ===
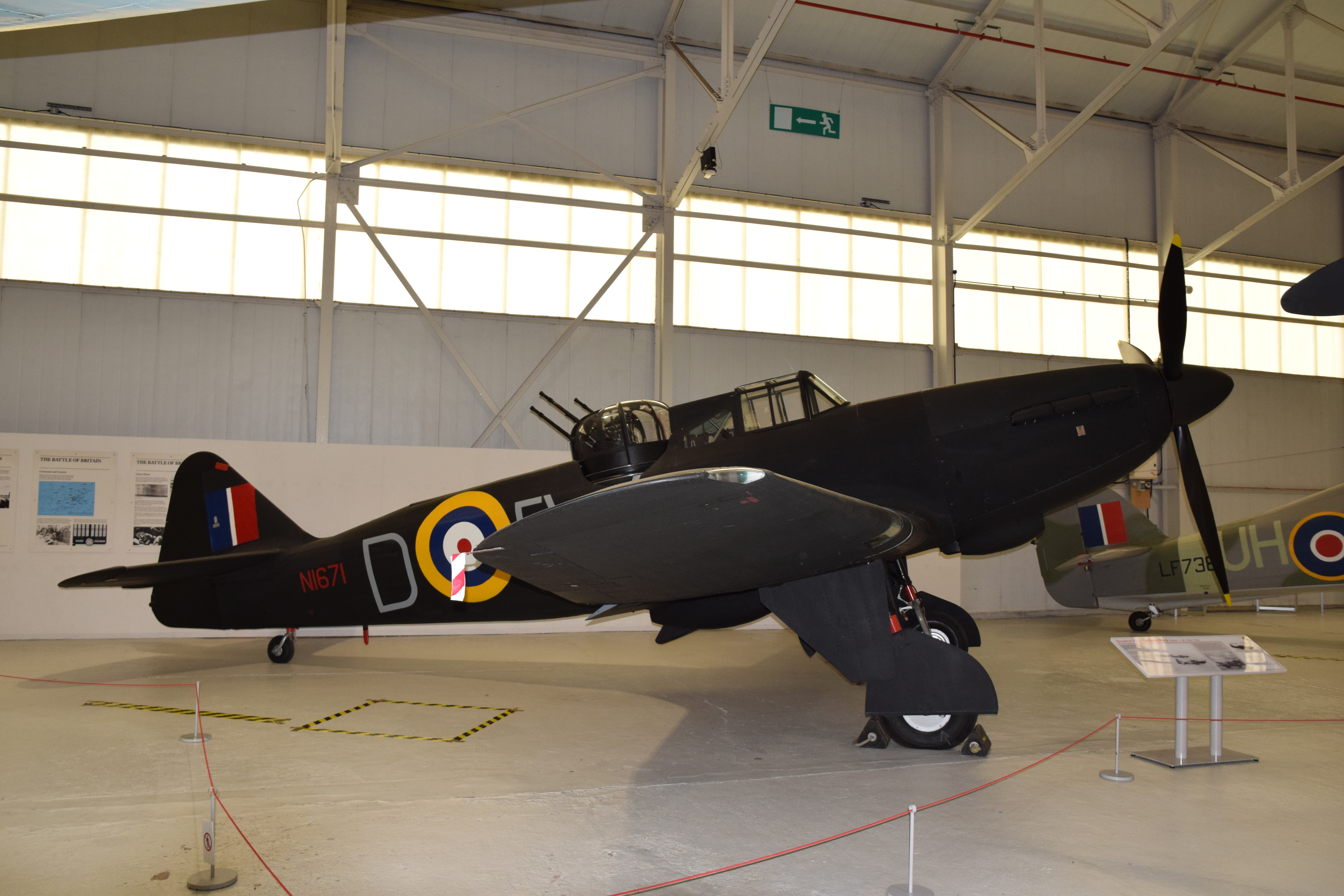
A Boulton Paul Defiant night fighter, the type flown by McMullen during The Blitz

Near the end of November, McMullen, promoted to acting flight lieutenant, was transferred to No. 151 Squadron where he was to be commander of one of the squadron's flights. It was to shortly begin the process in switching out its Hawker Hurricane fighters for Boulton Paul Defiant night fighters but being based at Wittering, the squadron rarely saw action unless the Luftwaffe targeted the Midlands during The Blitz. On the night of 15 January 1941, while flying a Hurricane, he probably destroyed a Junkers Ju 88 medium bomber in the vicinity of Cromer and Winterton. His flight lieutenant rank was made substantive at the start of March. He was awarded a Bar to his DFC just a few days later.

When he began flying the Defiants, McMullen was paired with Sergeant Fairweather as his gunner. The duo claimed their first aerial victory on the night of 8 April, shooting down a He 111 of Kampfgeschwader 55 (Battle Wing 55) over Coventry. The next night they destroyed another He 111, this time from Kampfgeschwader 26 (Battle Wing 26), to the west of Bramcote. A further He 111 was destroyed by McMullen and Fairweather over Tunbridge Wells on the night of 10 May.

=== Circus offensive ===
In July, McMullen was posted to No. 266 Squadron. This unit operated the Spitfire Mk IIa from Wittering, carrying out daylight sorties and sweeps to France as part of the RAF's Circus offensive. He shared in the destruction of a He 111 about 20 miles (32 km) to the east of Winterton on 19 August. This was followed two days later with McMullen's damaging of another He 111 to the northeast of Yarmouth. He claimed a He 111 as probably destroyed near Smith's Knoll on 12 September. Soon afterwards the squadron received an improved model of the Spitfire, the Mk Vb. Flying one of these on 13 October, he damaged a Bf 109 near Boulogne and destroyed a second a short distance near Le Touquet. With the squadron beginning to operate off the Dutch coast, on 25 October he shot down a Bf 110 some 40 miles (64 km) off Oostvoorne. By the end of November, the pace of operations was on the decline and he was posted away for a rest.

Sent to No. 55 Operational Training Unit as an instructor, McMullen was the recipient of a second Bar to his DFC in December. The published citation read:

This officer has participated in operational sorties over occupied France and Holland and has always evinced the keenest desire to engage the enemy. Since being awarded a Bar to the Distinguished Flying Cross Flight Lieutenant McMullen has destroyed 5 hostile aircraft bringing his total victories to at least 18, 3 of which were gained at night.

— London Gazette, No. 35378, 12 December 1941

He later instructed at No. 57 OTU at Hawarden. In March 1942, McMullen was promoted temporary squadron leader. He returned to operations the next month with a posting to Redhill as a supernumerary pilot with the Spitfire-equipped No. 602 Squadron. This attachment was brief, for he was transferred to another Spitfire unit, No. 124 Squadron, on 16 May. His new unit was stationed at Gravesend and conducting sorties to France. McMullen damaged a pair of Focke-Wulf Fw 190 fighters north of Cap Gris-Nez on 24 May.

=== Later war service ===
McMullen was appointed commander of No. 65 Squadron, another Spitfire unit based at Gravesend, in July. At the time, it was preparing to be sent to the Middle East but this move was abandoned and it returned to the work it had been doing, sweeps and sorties to France. He led the squadron during the Dieppe Raid on 19 August; in the morning it provided an escort for bombers to Dieppe. In the afternoon, the squadron patrolled over the Dieppe region, and during this time McMullen engaged and damaged a Dornier Do 217 medium bomber. This was his final aerial victory.

Relinquishing command of No. 65 Squadron in September, McMullen was subsequently posted to North Africa. He took up command of No. 324 Wing for a short period of time. This was his last operational posting and McMullen was transferred to a staff role. Back in the United Kingdom by August 1943, he spent the remainder of the war in an instructing role, at No. 53 OTU at Kirton-in-Lindsey, and then as a staff officer at the headquarters of No. 93 Group.

At the conclusion of hostilities in Europe in May 1945, he was credited with having shot down twenty-two aircraft, five being shared with other pilots. Additionally, five aircraft, and a share in a sixth, that were claimed by McMullen as being destroyed were unconfirmed. He is also credited with seven aircraft, one of which being shared, as probably destroyed and twelve damaged.

== Later life ==
McMullen remained in the RAF in the postwar period although little is known of his service during this time. He retired from the military in December 1957, holding the rank of acting wing commander. He died on 1 July 1985.
