= Tommy L. Smith =

Australian rules footballer, born 1914

Tommy Smith

Personal information
- Full name: Tommy Smith
- Born: 23 March 1914
- Died: 18 July 1985 (aged 71)
- Original team: St Albans
- Height: 189 cm (6 ft 2 in)
- Weight: 79 kg (174 lb)

Playing career^{1}
Years	Club	Games (Goals)
1936	Essendon	10 (8)
1937	Footscray	2 (0)
Total		12 (8)
- ^{1} Playing statistics correct to the end of 1937.

Tommy Smith (23 March 1914 – 18 July 1985) was a former Australian rules footballer who played with Essendon and Footscray in the Victorian Football League (VFL).
