= Frederick Kaufman =

American chemist

Frederick Kaufman (September 13, 1919 – July 6, 1985) was an Austrian-born American chemist. Kaufman was most notable for his research work which led to a ban on the use of chloro-fluorocarbon aerosol propellants in the United States. Kaufman was director of the University of Pittsburgh's Space Research Coordination Center, and a member of the National Academy of Sciences, president of the Combustion Institute. He served on various committees of the National Academy of Sciences, NASA, AFOSR, National Science Foundation, and National Research Council. He was also president of Space Research Coordination Center. The National Academies Press called Kaufman "a leader in the field of gas-phase chemical kinetics and its application to the understanding of atmospheric and combustion processes".

== Life, education, career ==
Kaufman was born in Vienna, Austria. Following the annexation of Austria by Hitler, he and his family emigrated to Panama in 1938. He immigrated to Baltimore, the United States in 1941. He received his doctorate from Johns Hopkins University in 1948 without getting an undergraduate degree.
