= James Minter =

Australian cricketer

Personal information
- Born: 13 September 1917; Kempsey, New South Wales, Australia
- Died: 2 July 1985 (aged 67); Vincentia, New South Wales, Australia
- Source: ESPNcricinfo, 9 January 2017

James Minter (13 September 1917 – 2 July 1985) was an Australian cricketer. He played one first-class match for New South Wales in 1938/39.

== See also ==
- List of New South Wales representative cricketers
