= Marcus Hines =

Australian rules footballer, born 1919

Personal information
- Full name: Marcus George Hines
- Born: 20 November 1919; Beechworth, Victoria
- Died: 26 July 1985 (aged 65); Prahran, Victoria
- Height: 170 cm (5 ft 7 in)
- Weight: 71 kg (157 lb)

Playing career^{1}
Years	Club	Games (Goals)
1940–41	St Kilda	6 (2)
- ^{1} Playing statistics correct to the end of 1941.

Marcus George Hines (20 November 1919 – 26 July 1985) was an Australian rules footballer who played with St Kilda in the Victorian Football League (VFL).
