= Stella Blum =

American art historian

- Born: 19 October 1916; Schenectady, New York
- Died: 31 July 1985 (aged 68); Ravenna, Ohio
- Education: Syracuse University (B.F.A.); New York University; Queens College; New York University Institute of Fine Arts
- Occupation: Fashion historian
- Spouse: George A. Blum

Stella Blum, née Biercuk (19 October 1916 – 31 July 1985), was an American fashion historian.

== Life ==
Stella Blum was born in Schenectady, New York on 19 October 1916 and graduated from Syracuse University with a B.F.A. degree in 1938. She married George A. Blum the following year and they had two sons together. She attended New York University, Queens College and New York University Institute of Fine Arts. Blum worked for the Museum of Costume Art from 1940 until 1942 when she quit to raise her children. Upon her return in 1953, she was appointed assistant curator and was promoted to associate curator in 1970 and curator of costumes at the Costume Institute from 1970 to 1973. She left the Metropolitan Museum, into which the Costume Institute had merged, to open a new center for the decorative arts and costumes at Kent State University from 1983 to 1985. Blum died of cancer in Ravenna, Ohio, on 31 July 1985.

== Activities ==
Blum was a guest curator for the Detroit Institute of Arts, Flint Institute of Arts, Portland Museum of Art, and St. Louis Museum and she cataloged exhibitions in Australia, Switzerland, and Japan. She wrote four books on fashion history, often using images from period catalogs or magazines to illustrate the clothes.
