= Israel Breslow =

Israel Breslow (1906 in Russian Empire – July 28, 1985 in New York City) was a garment worker, local union manager, union staffer, and Vice-President of the International Ladies' Garment Workers' Union (ILGWU).

== Biography ==
Israel Breslow was born in the Russian Empire, emigrated to Canada, and settled in New York City where he had a long career with the ILGWU. Breslow was a member of the Amalgamated Clothing Workers of America from 1922 to 1936 while working in Canada. In 1936, after moving to New York City and beginning work as an operator in the garment industry, Breslow joined Dressmakers Local 22. Breslow served on the local's executive board and as business agent, before eventually being elected manager of Local 22, serving in that role from 1958 to 1975. In 1962, Breslow became a Vice-President of the ILGWU.

He retired from the ILGWU in 1975, after which he became president of the Jewish Daily Forward Association. Additionally, Breslow was president of the Workmen's Circle from 1958 to 1962, and again from 1966 to 1970. He died in New York City, at the age of 79.

== Sources ==
ILGWU. Communications Department biography files. 5780/177. Kheel Center for Labor-Management Documentation and Archives, Martin P. Catherwood Library, Cornell University.

"Israel Breslow, Labor Leader Who Led Jewish Organization." The New York Times. 31 Jul. 1985.
