= Prague 22 =

Prague 22 Praha 22
- Municipal District of Prague; Administrative District of Prague
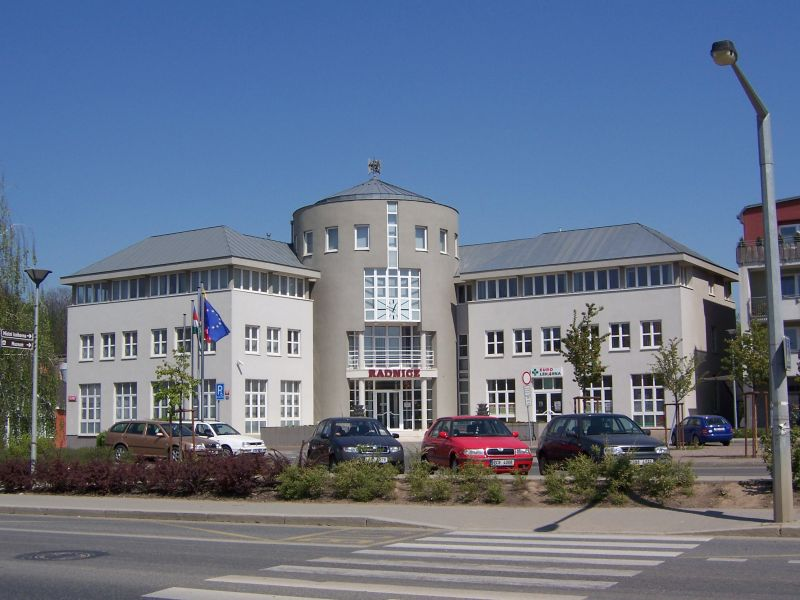
- Town hall of Prague 22

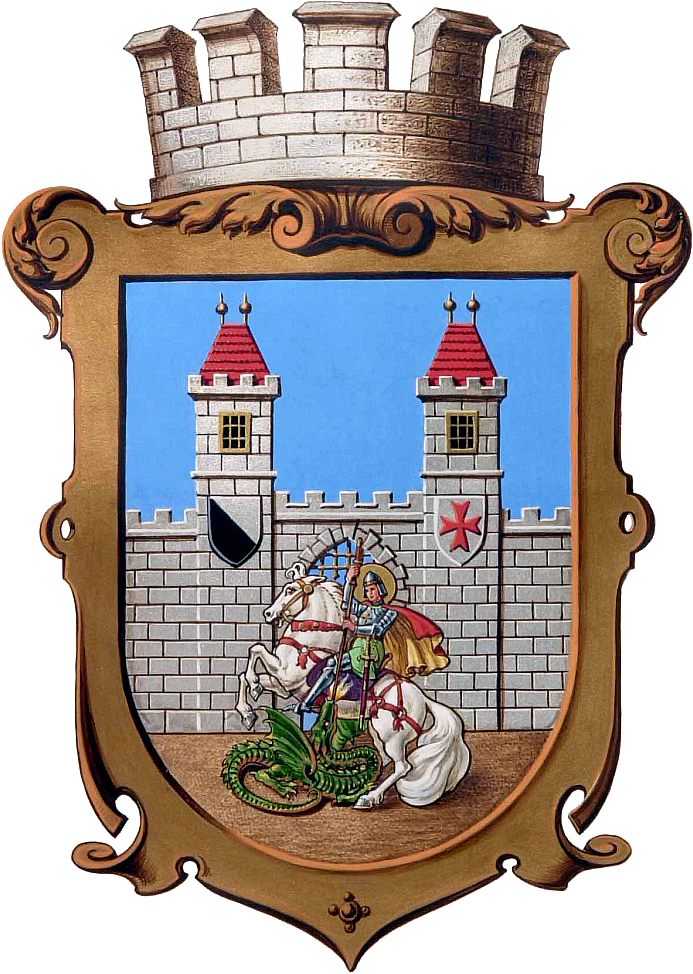
- Flag Coat of arms

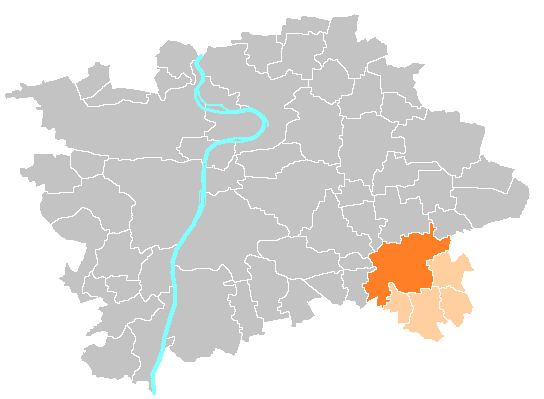
- Location of Prague 22 in Prague
- Coordinates: 50°1′47″N 14°36′35″E
- Country: Czech Republic
- Region: Prague

Government
  - Mayor: Tomáš Kaněra

Area
  - Total: 15.61 km^{2} (6.03 sq mi)

Population (2021)
  - Total: 13,903
  - Density: 890.6/km^{2} (2,307/sq mi)
- Time zone: UTC+1 (CET)
  - Summer (DST): UTC+2 (CEST)
- Postal code: 104 00
- Website: http://www.praha22.cz

Prague 22, also known as Uhříněves, is a municipal district (městská část) in Prague, Czech Republic. It is located in the south eastern part of the city.

The administrative district (správní obvod) of the same name comprises municipal districts Prague 22, Benice, Kolovraty, Královice and Nedvězí.

Uhříněves is home to the largest freight railway container terminal in Central Europe.

== Demographics ==
Historical population
Year	Pop.	±%
1869	1,632	—
1880	2,053	+25.8%
1890	2,412	+17.5%
1900	2,674	+10.9%
1910	3,096	+15.8%
1921	3,337	+7.8%
1930	5,024	+50.6%
1950	5,040	+0.3%
1961	5,287	+4.9%
1970	5,016	−5.1%
1980	5,115	+2.0%
1991	4,314	−15.7%
2001	4,629	+7.3%
2011	9,486	+104.9%
2021	13,903	+46.6%
Source: Censuses

== See also ==
- FC Čechie Uhříněves
