= Vlastimil Hála =

Czech composer and trumpeter

- Birth name: Vlastimil Hála
- Born: 7 July 1924
- Origin: Most, Czechoslovakia
- Died: 29 July 1985 (aged 61)
- Genres: Jazz
- Occupation(s): Trumpeter composer arranger
- Instrument: Trumpet

Vlastimil Hála (7 July 1924 – 29 July 1985) was a Czech jazz trumpeter, composer, and arranger. During the period of 1947–1964 he worked as arranger for Karel Vlach's orchestra. Hála's textbook on instrumentation has not lost its significance even in our day.
