= Trevor Jones (Australian footballer) =

Australian rules footballer, born 1918

Personal information
- Full name: Trevor Jones
- Born: 3 May 1918
- Died: 22 July 1985 (aged 67)
- Original team: Errol Street State School
- Height: 183 cm (6 ft 0 in)
- Weight: 75 kg (165 lb)

Playing career^{1}
Years	Club	Games (Goals)
1940	North Melbourne	1 (1)
- ^{1} Playing statistics correct to the end of 1940.

Trevor Jones (3 May 1918 – 22 July 1985) was an Australian rules footballer who played with North Melbourne in the Victorian Football League (VFL).
