= Patrick Feyder =

Luxembourgish footballer

Personal information
- Date of birth: 25 October 1971 (age 55)
- Position: Defender

Senior career*
Years	Team	Apps	(Gls)
1988–1991	Progrès Niederkorn		
1991–1996	Union Luxembourg		

International career
- Luxembourg U21
1995	Luxembourg	2	(0)
- * Club domestic league appearances and goals

Patrick Feyder (born 25 October 1971) is a retired Luxembourgish football defender.
