= Ursula Batchelder Stone =

American professor

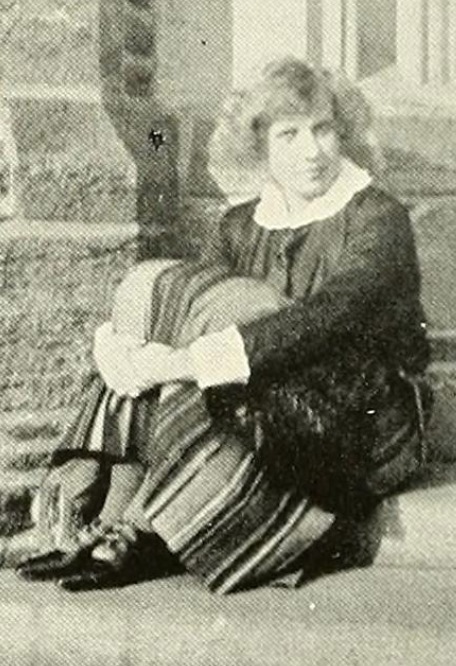
- Ursula Batchelder, from the 1922 yearbook of Bryn Mawr College
- Born: Ursula Chase Batchelder; June 26, 1900; Faribault, Minnesota
- Died: July 8, 1985 (aged 85)
- Occupation(s): College professor, business researcher

Ursula Batchelder Stone (June 26, 1900 – July 8, 1985) was an American business researcher, civic leader, and college professor. In 1929 she became the first woman to earn a PhD in business at an American university.

== Early life and education ==
Ursula Chase Batchelder was born in Faribault, Minnesota, the daughter of Charles Spoor Batchelder and Mary Alzina Chase Batchelder.

Batchelder graduated from Bryn Mawr College in 1922, and completed doctoral studies in business at the University of Chicago in 1929, with a dissertation titled "The Baking Industry with Special Reference to the Bread-Making Industry in Chicago." She is considered the first woman to earn a PhD in business at an American university.

== Career ==
After graduate school, Stone and Rachel Marshall Goetz ran the Batchelder and Marshall Research Service, providing data analysis and research reports for businesses in Chicago.

Stone was a member of the faculty of George Williams College, teaching economics and social science courses from 1939 to 1965. She was co-author of The Baking Industry Under N. R. A. (1936) with Raleigh Webster Stone, and Food Buying and Our Markets (1938) with Day Monroe.

She was president of the Hyde Park League of Women Voters (LWV) from 1939 to 1941, president of the Cook County LWV from 1941 to 1944, and president of the Illinois LWV. She co-wrote the LWV's radio program, The Women Speak. In 1952 she helped to organize and lead the Southeast Chicago Commission. In 1960 she was named a distinguished alumna of the University of Chicago.

== Personal life ==
Batchelder married a University of Chicago professor, Raleigh Webster Stone, in 1928. They had two children. Her husband died in 1969. She died in 1985, aged 85 years, in Chicago. Her papers are in the University of Chicago Library.
