= László Salgó =

Hungarian rabbi (1910–1985)

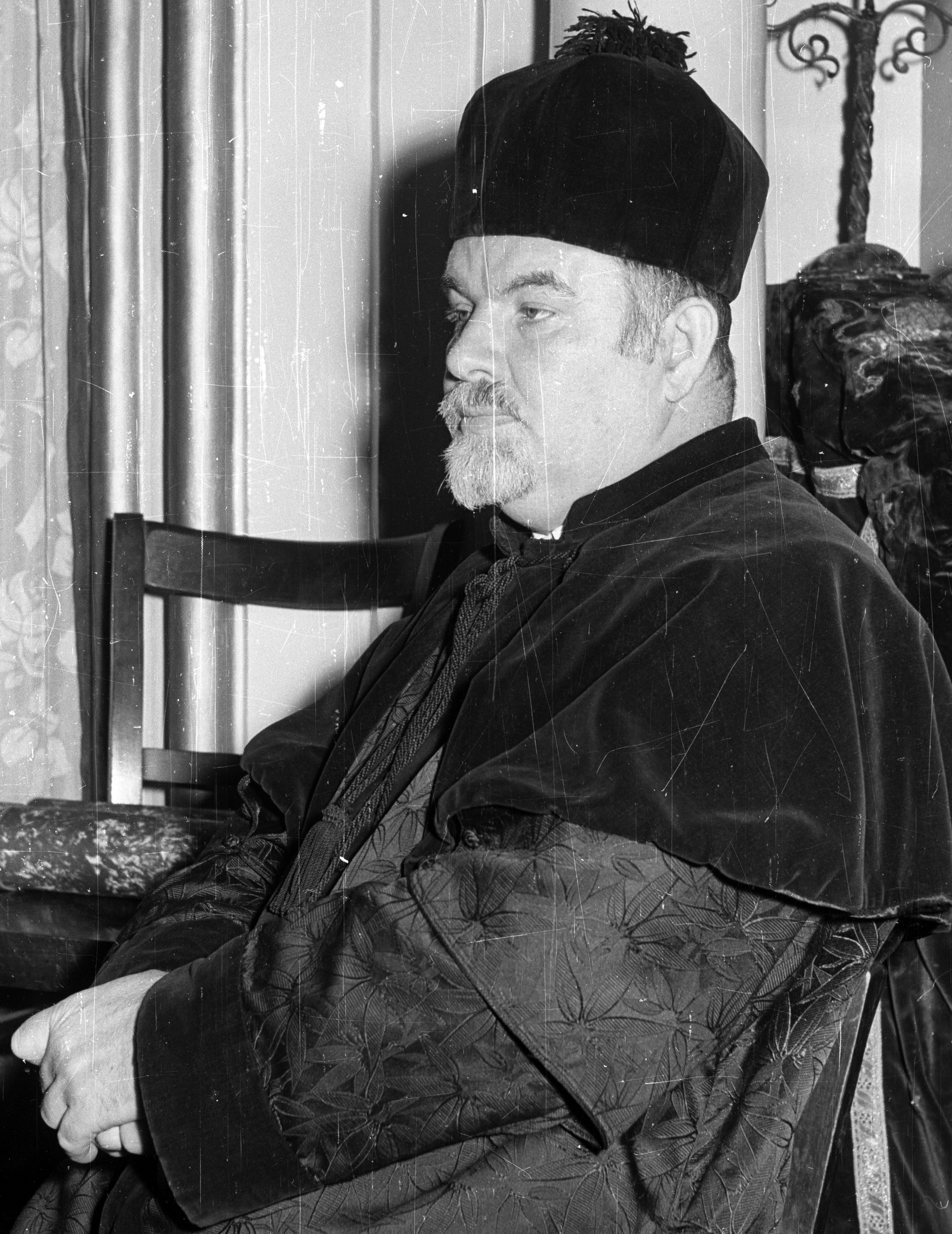
László Salgó

László Salgó (23 April 1910, Budapest – 24 July 1985, Budapest) was a Hungarian rabbi and member of the National Assembly.

== Life ==
He became a rabbi in 1935, and then became deputy rabbi and worked at the synagogue in Józsefváros, and became chief rabbi at the same place after 1945. In July 1957, he served on a delegation of Hungarian rabbis to a celebration of the tenth anniversary of Gustav Sicher's installation as the chief rabbi of Prague. In 1959, he was the Director of the Budapest Rabbinate (ritual as superintendent) and worked as a professor at the National Jewish Theological Seminary, also known as the Budapest Rabbinical Seminary. He was a member of the National Jewish Council. From 1971 until his death, he was the Deputy Chief Rabbi of the Dohány Street Synagogue in Budapest and the senior rabbi of the main temple. On April 22, 1980, he was awarded the Order of the Flag of the Hungarian People's Republic. He was a member of Hungary's National Assembly from 1981 through 1985. Upon the death of the rabbinical seminary's director Sándor Scheiber in March 1985, Salgó briefly assumed the directorship until his own death later that year.
