= Elie Grekoff =

Elie Grekoff (11 October 1914 – 16 July 1985) was a French artist of Russian birth.

== Life ==
Grekoff was born in Saratov, in the province of the Don, the son of a railway engineer.

During the Russian Revolution he drifted with his family across Russia, according to the ebb and flow of combat. They stayed for a time in a family property near Sevastopol, but in 1920 took refuge in Turkey. In Istanbul and its surroundings, life became for exiles became increasingly difficult. From the age of ten, Elie had to work. He was unable to attend a school for Russian immigrants for more than a year, although he managed to spend a few months, at the end of his stay in Turkey, at the American School. In 1928, when he was fourteen, the family decided to settle in France. Grekoff, his father and one of his brothers, at first became farm workers in the south, before working in the "Hutchinson" factories in Chalette close to Montargis. After a year they moved to Paris, continuing to work in the a "Hutchinson"-owned factory. Grekoff undertook a TSF night school course, and joined his older brother in a small radio factory. In 1935, as a result of a chance encounter, Grekoff destiny changed.

Ever since he had been a child, Grekoff had dreamed of being a painter, and in 1935 a friend recommended him to an architect who was willing to welcome him into his office.

Grekoff felt architecture was not his calling, and soon abandoned it to enter the Fernand Léger Academy. Very quickly, Léger recognised his potential. In 1937 Grekoff executed his first wall mural. For the International Exhibition in Paris, he was in charge of decorating a large roof panel.

With the outbreak of World War II, Grekoff was mobilised, captured in 1940, and spent six months in captivity in Laval. In then spent another six months as a nurse-paramedic in the Val de Grace. It was during his captivity that he met the owner of Editions de Cluny, who, immediately after their release, commissioned him to illustrate several luxury edition books, including "Les fleurs du mal" by Baudelaire (etchings); "The blind clairvoyant" by Father Bruckberger (etchings); and "Hell" by Patrice Tower Pine (lithographs).

The result such a success that the publisher of Crezevault Adressat commissioned seventy two lithographs from him for an edition of "Crime and Punishment", which took Grekoff two years to complete. His Russian heredity and hard work resulted in a work that was considered to be in profound harmony with that of Dostoevsky.

In 1949 he illustrated Poèmes. Les Stupra. Album dit Zutique (extraits) by Arthur Rimbaud, providing 17 homoerotic engravings for a luxury edition of just thirty copies, a few of which were hand coloured.

In 1954 he illustrated Tirésias by Marcel Jouhandeau, for an edition of 120, providing 20 wood engravings, 15 of which were published in the book, and 5 in a separate slipcase as refusées prints. Sold "under the counter", and condemned by a court in 1964, it is now considered a masterpiece of homoerotic publishing.

In 1959, with the assistance of Pierre Monteret, he painted frescos for the hall of a girls high school hall in Compiègne.

After the war Grekoff become noted for his work in tapestry: almost all Grekoff tapestries were woven in Aubusson workshops.

Until 1962, Grekoff compositions consisted in large measure of human themes: somewhat melancholic young men, girls and children, in arcadian settings. In 1962, Grekoff left Paris for the quiet of the Anjou countryside. People no longer appeared in works; replaced by nature – trees, insects, birds and skies.
