= Petr Sepeši =

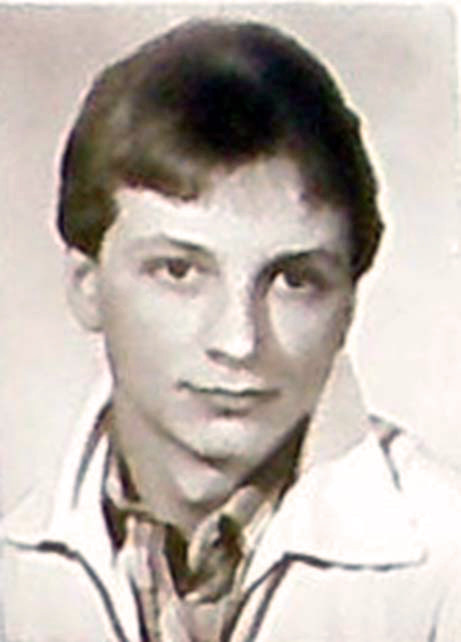

Background information
- Born: 23 April 1960; Brezno, Czechoslovakia
- Died: 29 July 1985 (aged 25) Františkovy Lázně, Czechoslovakia
- Genres: Pop
- Occupation: Singer
- Instrument: Vocals
- Labels: Supraphon, Bonton Music

Petr Sepeši (23 April 1960 – 29 July 1985) was a Czech singer.

== Biography ==
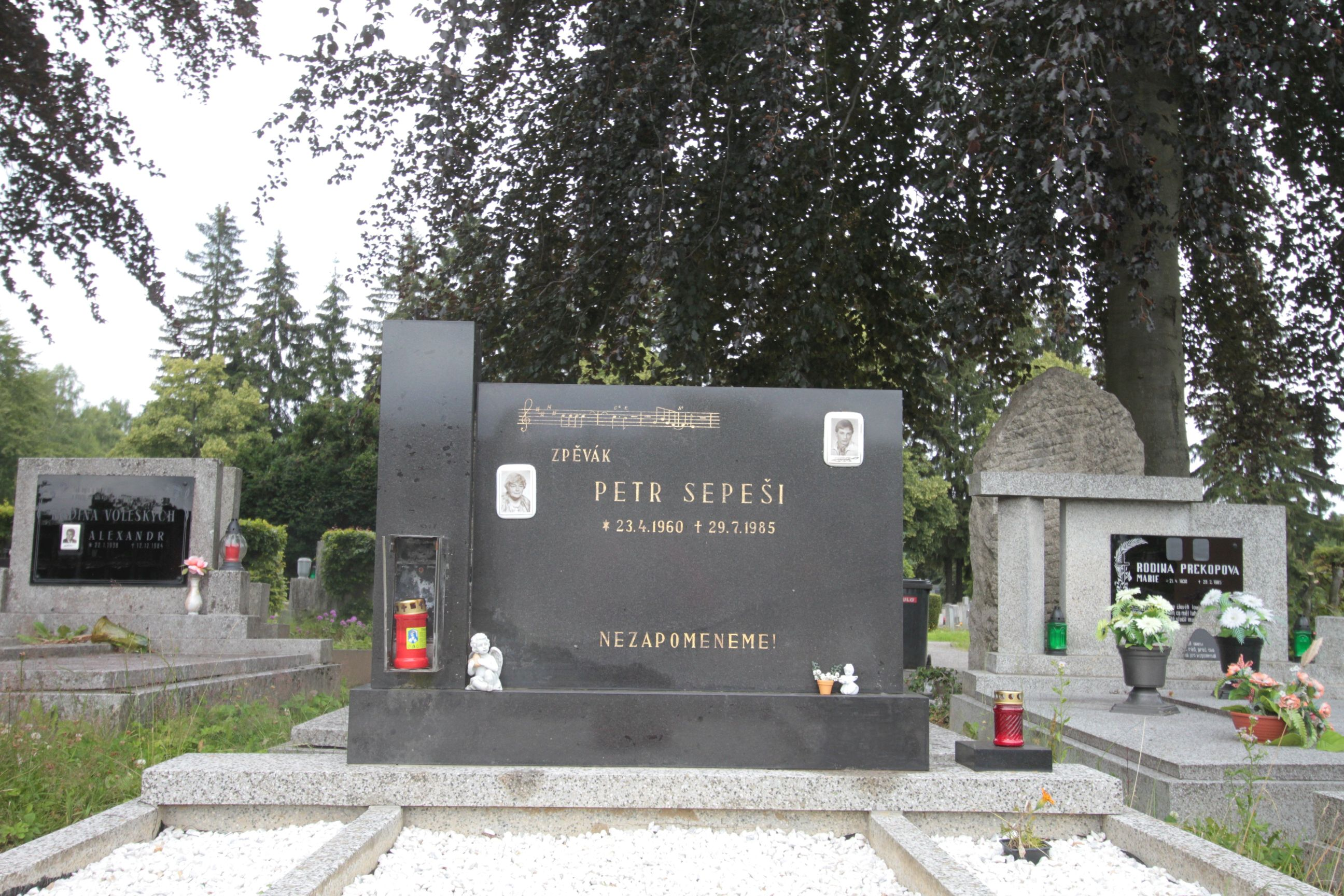
Sepeši's grave in the municipal cemetery in Aš

Sepeši was born on 23 April 1960 in Brezno (today's Slovakia). From 1962 to his death, he lived alternately in Aš until his death in 1985. He graduated from the mechanics of textile machines and then worked in NC Tosta Aš. At that time, he began to be interested in music and formed a band named Apendix. In 1978, he became friends with Petr Kotvald. From 1983 to his death, he was in a relationship with Iveta Bartošová, with whom he founded a singing couple, and with whom he collaborated with extensively.

Sepeši died in a car crash on the evening of 29 July 1985 at the age of 25. He died along with two other people, at a railway crossing in Františkovy Lázně, when he was heading from Prague home to visit his mother in his hometown of Aš. He was buried in the municipal cemetery in Aš. Bartošová survived him by almost 29 years.
