= Alphonse Feyder =

Luxembourgish footballer

Personal information
- Date of birth: 12 June 1916
- Date of death: 23 July 1985 (aged 69)
- Position: Defender

International career
Years	Team	Apps	(Gls)
1938–1947	Luxembourg	6	(0)

Alphonse Feyder (12 June 1916 – 23 July 1985) was a Luxembourgish footballer. He played in six matches for the Luxembourg national football team from 1938 to 1947. He was also part of Luxembourg's squad for the football tournament at the 1936 Summer Olympics, but he did not play in any matches.
