= Earl D. Thomas =

Earl Davis Thomas (November 24, 1897 – July 15, 1985) was an educator, civic leader, and the first African American councilman-at-large for Kansas City, Missouri. He was born in Kansas City, Kansas, and graduated from Sumner High School before attending the University of Chicago, where he earned his B.A. and M.A.. He then went on to earn his PhD in education from the University of Kansas.

== Early life and career ==
As a child, Thomas delivered groceries for Griffin's Grocery Store before starting at Missouri Pacific Freight House at the age of 14. Thomas aspired to be a doctor and attended the University of Chicago and received his bachelor of philosophy and his master of arts.

Thomas began his teaching career as an industrial arts teacher in 1918 in Springfield Missouri before returning to the Kansas City area to teach at Wendell Phillips School in 1921. In 1925, Thomas helped organize the Jackson County Parental Home, and transferred to Lincoln High School in 1929.

After gaining a leave of absence from the Kansas City School District in 1933, Thomas helped the Paul Lawrence Dunbar High School in Dayton Ohio as part of the first Black administration in the state. Thomas was vice principal before returning to Kansas City in 1936 to help organize R. T. Coles Vocational and Junior High School and become its first principal.

In 1947 Thomas became the principal of both Lincoln High School and dean of Lincoln Junior College, as well as director of the city-wide YMCA, member of the Kansas City Commission on Human Relations, a director of the Greater Kansas City Mental Health Foundation, as well as a director of the Kansas City Area Council of the Boy Scouts of America. Thomas later gained his Doctor of Philosophy degree in education at the University of Kansas.

In 1963, Thomas was elected to the Kansas City City Council as the first African-American candidate. retiring in 1971, Thomas served two four-year terms, representing Kansas City's 3rd district.

== Personal life ==
Thomas married Anne Jenkins, a member of the board for the national YMCA. He had one daughter, Ann Elizabeth.
