= Ferdinand Haberl =

German Catholic theologian, composer, musicologist, organist and choir director

Ferdinand Haberl (15 March 1906 – 3 July 1985) was a German Catholic theologian, composer, musicologist, organist and choir director. He was director of the Hochschule für Katholische Kirchenmusik und Musikpädagogik Regensburg, honorary professor of Catholic church music at the University of Regensburg and president of the Pontifical Institute of Sacred Music in Rome.

== Life ==
Born in Lintach, Haberl studied theology and musicology in Munich and Regensburg from 1926. In 1931, he received his holy orders. He then worked as pastor and music prefect in Schönwald before continuing his studies in Munich from 1933 to 1934. From 1934 to 1938, he was organist at the German national church Pontifical Institute Santa Maria dell' Anima in Rome. In 1939, he received his doctorate in theology in Munich. Afterwards, he took over the direction of the church music school in Regensburg. From 1964, he was an honorary professor at the University of Regensburg. In 1970, he was appointed President of the Pontifical Institute of Sacred Music and in 1971, he was appointed Pontifical Honorary Prelate.

Haberl devoted himself to composition and musicological work, composed numerous church music works and produced several theoretical writings and monographs on musicians of the Upper Palatinate.

Habeml died in Regensburg at the age of 79.

== Publications ==
- Die Inkarnationslehre des heiligen Albertus Magnus. Freiburg: Herder 1939, zugl.: Munich, Theol. Diss.
- Das Deutsche Amt und die Enzyklika Musicae sacrae disciplina. Regensburg: Pustet 1956

== Awards ==
- 1966: Nordgaupreis des Oberpfälzer Kulturbundes in the music category
- 1970: Orlando-di-Lasso-Medaille of the Allgemeinen Cäcilien-Verbands
- 1972: Bayerischer Verdienstorden
- 1976: Kulturpreis der Stadt Regensburg
- 1981: Bundesverdienstkreuz 1. Klasse
