= Henk van Tilburg =

Dutch footballer

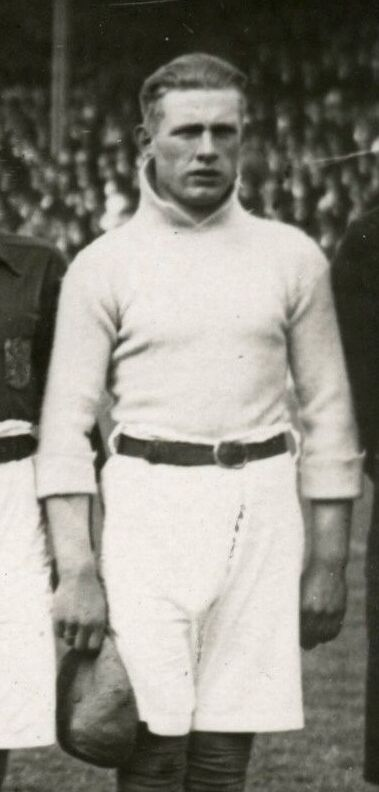
- van Tilburg (1921)

Personal information
- Date of birth: 2 December 1898
- Date of death: 14 July 1985 (aged 86)

International career
Years	Team	Apps	(Gls)
1921–1922	Netherlands	9	(0)

Henk van Tilburg (2 December 1898 – 14 July 1985) was a Dutch footballer. He played in nine games for the Netherlands national football team from 1921 to 1923.
