= Svatba upírů =

1993 Czech comedy film

Svatba upírů is a Czech comedy film directed by Jaroslav Soukup. It was released in 1993.
