= Tommy Priestley =

Northern Irish footballer (1911–1985)

Personal information
- Full name: Thomas James Montgomery Priestley
- Date of birth: 11 March 1911
- Place of birth: Belfast, Northern Ireland
- Date of death: 28 July 1985 (aged 74)
- Place of death: Belfast, Northern Ireland
- Position: Striker

Senior career*
Years	Team	Apps	(Gls)
1928–1932	Coleraine		
1932–1933	Linfield		
1933–1934	Chelsea	23	(1)
- Shelbourne

International career
1932–1933	Ireland	2	(0)
- * Club domestic league appearances and goals

Thomas James Montgomery Priestley (11 March 1911 – 28 July 1985) was a Northern Irish footballer who played at both professional and international levels as a striker.

== Personal life ==
Born in Belfast, Priestley wore a rugby-style skull cap to cover his premature baldness.

== Career ==
=== Club career ===
Priestley began his senior career with Coleraine in 1928, after moving there from Cookstown. Priestley moved to Linfield in 1932, before signing with English side Chelsea just a year later. Priestley only spent one season with Chelsea - making 23 appearances in The Football League - before returning to Ireland with Shelbourne.

=== International career ===
Priestley earned two caps for Ireland between 1932 and 1933.
